= Faial da Terra =

- Civil parish
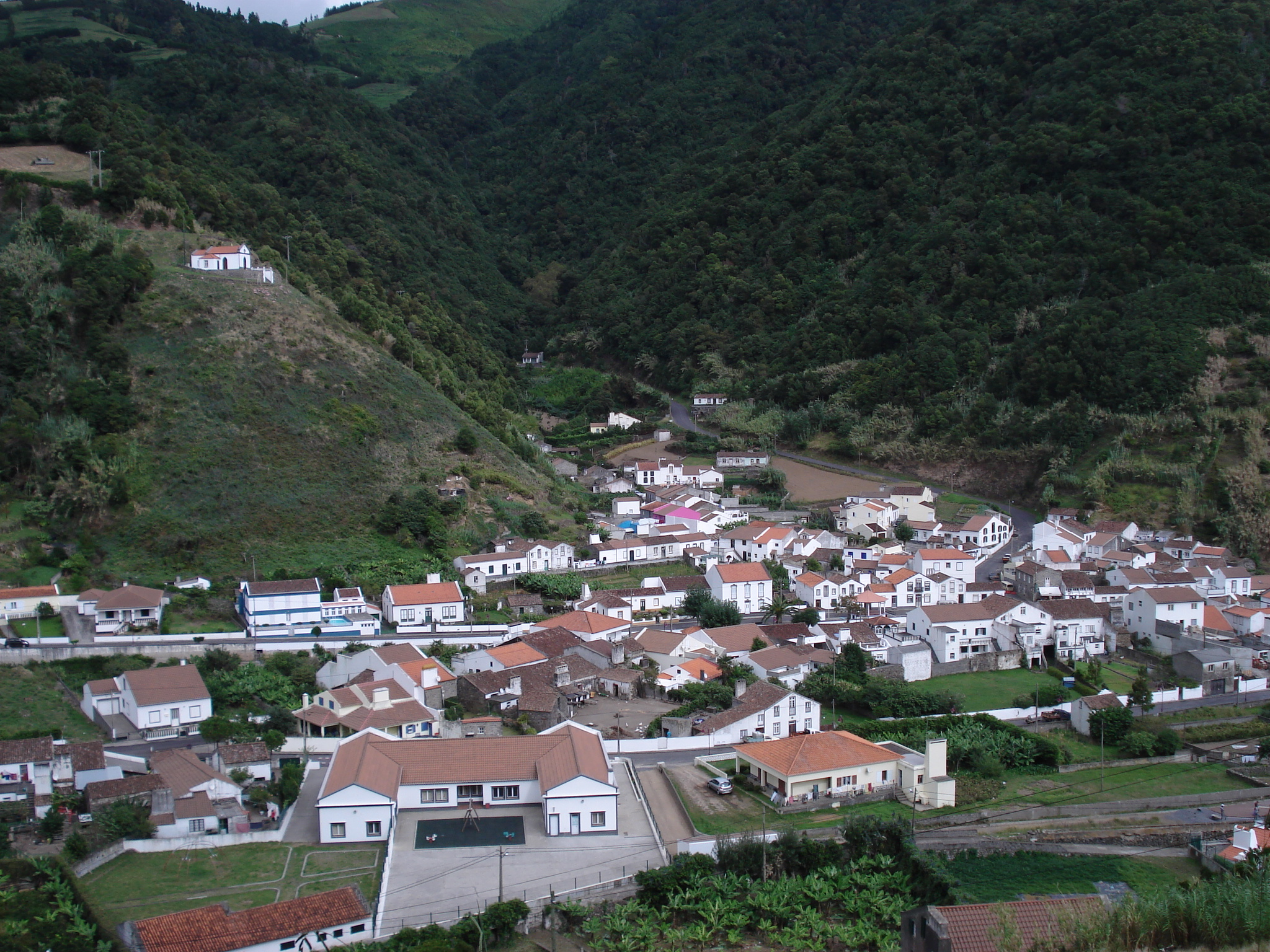
- The central agglomeration of Faial da Terra, concentrated along the Ribeira da Terra

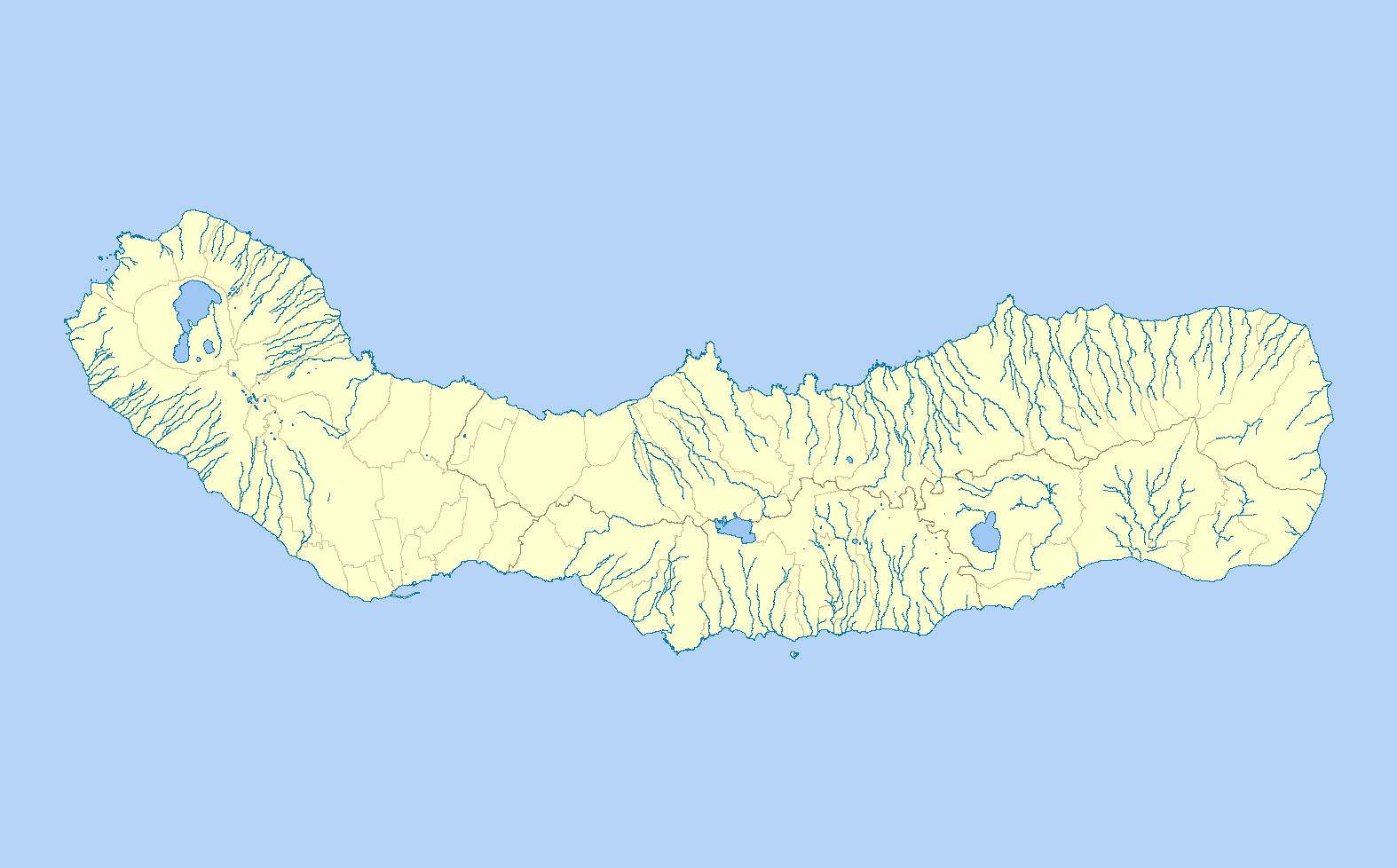
- Location in the Azores Faial da Terra (São Miguel)
- Coordinates: 37°45′3″N 25°12′9″W
- Country: Portugal
- Auton. region: Azores
- Island: São Miguel
- Municipality: Povoação

Area
  - Total: 11.38 km^{2} (4.39 sq mi)
- Elevation: 82 m (269 ft)

Population (2011)
  - Total: 359
  - Density: 31.5/km^{2} (81.7/sq mi)
- Time zone: UTC−01:00 (AZOT)
  - Summer (DST): UTC+00:00 (AZOST)
- Postal code: 9650-114
- Area code: 296 586-XXX
- Patron: Nossa Senhora da Luz

Faial da Terra is a civil parish in the municipality of Povoação on the island of São Miguel in the Portuguese archipelago of the Azores. The population in 2011 was 359, in an area of 11.38 km^{2}. It contains the localities Burguete, Faial da Terra, Outeiro, Rebentão, and Sanguinho.

== Geography ==
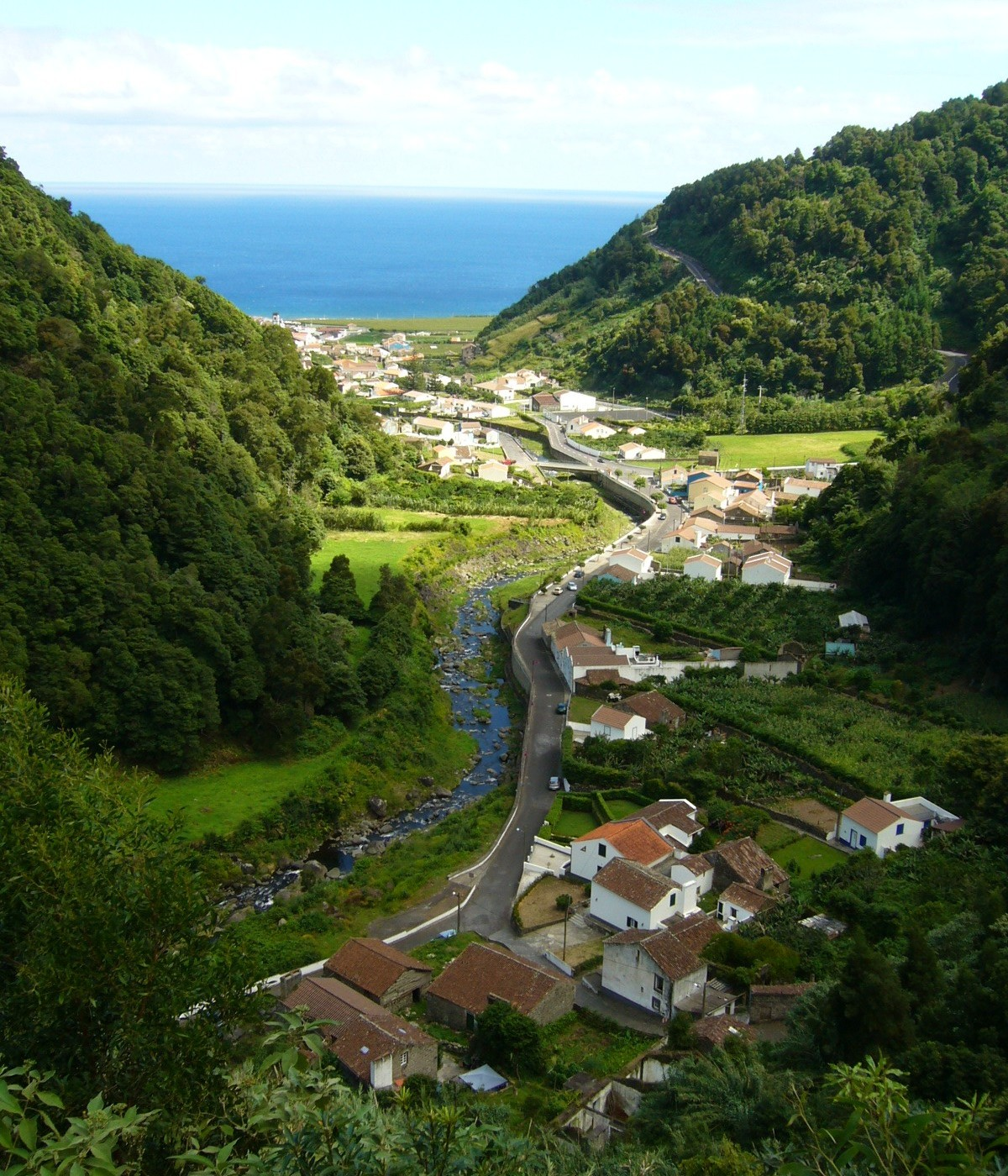
Faial da Terra as viewed from northern micro-settlement of Sanguinho and trail

The civil parish is located on the southeastern coast of the island fronting the Atlantic Ocean, with the interior occupied by the Nordeste massif, crowned by Pico da Vara, the highest point on the island. To the west and east are the neighbouring parishes of the municipality of Povoação, that include: Furnas and Povação (to the west) and Água Retorta (to the east).

Apart from the village, there is a smaller collection of houses known as Sanguinho, located upriver. By way of a trail, this site links to the town and the waterfalls at Salto do Prego.

== Economy ==
The community is primarily involved in agriculture and husbandry, as well as commerce related to the same. Artisanal products produced in Faial da Terra include basket-weaving, embroidery, needlework and artefacts in wood.

== Architecture ==
In addition to fountains, a band shelter and a bust of Father Elias, watermills, lookouts and the old whaling port,

the

- Church of Nossa Senhora da Graça (Portuguese: Igreja Paroquial de Faial da Terra/Igreja de Nossa Senhora da Graça)
- Hermitage of Nossa Senhora de Lurdes (Portuguese: Ermida do Faial da Terra/Ermida de Nossa Senhora de Lurdes), although a popular religious site, it was damaged by an earthquake on 5 July 1932.

== Culture ==
The parish celebrates feasts associated with Nossa Senhora da Graça (Our Lady of Grace) on second Sunday in September, and whose images are located in the parochial church. Associated with the Cult of the Holy Spirit there feast days following Pentecosts, and include celebrations at the Impérios Ascensão, Trindade and S. João.

In addition to the typically-Azorean dishes, Faial da Terra is known for Fervedouro, Molho de fígado and Sopa de Tomate de Tia Conceição; typical meals including the annual Holy Spirit soups, associated with the religious Cult of the Holy Spirit, Papas grossas, Bolo da Sertã, Torresmos, Morcela and Chouriço .

Among the musical and social groups found in the community are the Sociedade Musical “Sagrado Coração de Jesus” (Musical Society "Sacred Heart of Jesus") and Grupo Desportivo de Faial da Terra (Faial da Terra Sporting Group).
