= Congro Volcanic Fissural System =

Volcanic system on São Miguel Island

Congro Volcanic Fissural System Sistema Vulcanica da Achada das Furnas
- Volcanic system
- Location: Eastern Group, Azores, Portugal
- Geology: Alkali basalt

The Congro Volcanic Fissural System (Portuguese: Sistema Vulcânico Fissural do Congro) is a system of scoria cones that build up the central region of the island of São Miguel (between the Água de Pau and Furnas volcanoes). This volcano is very young with most of it only 5000 years old.

== History ==
The history of this volcanic system is dominated by basaltic, fissural, Hawaiian and Strombolian eruptions aligned in a dominantly west-northwest to east-southeast direction. Many of the products of these eruptions are visible in systematic bands of thick bands of ash and pumice, resulting from many of the scoria cones located in the zone. In the last 5000 years there is evidence of episodic Phreatomagnetic eruptions from trachyte evidence, dated to 3.800± 400 years B.C., that originated the Lagoa do Congro maar.

== Geography ==
The Congro system is situated in the central-eastern portion of the island of São Miguel, separated the Água de Pau Massif and crater of the Furnas volcano, and includes scoria cones and lava flows associated with ancient volcanic eruptions. In addition, there are several examples of maars and lava domes.

Although it is the least eruptive of the systems forming the island of São Miguel, it has shown a higher frequency of important seismic activities associated with tectonic and volcano-related pressures.
