= Picos Volcanic Fissural System =

Volcanic system in Portugal

- Volcanic system
- Location: Eastern Group, Azores, Portugal
- Geology: Alkali basalt
- Highest elevation: 874 m (2,867 ft)

The Picos Volcanic Fissural System (Portuguese: Sistema Vulcânico Fissural dos Picos) is a system of scoria cones that build up the central region of the island of São Miguel (between Sete Cidades and Água de Pau volcanoes). This volcano is very young with most of it only 5000 years old. The only recorded eruption was in 1652, but seven other eruptions have taken place in the cinder cone group in the last 10,000 years.

== History ==
This volcanic system is the most recently formed on the island of São Miguel, with its eruptive history dominated by Hawaiian, basaltic and Stromboli phases.

In the last 5000 years, there have been approximately 30 eruptions, with the most recent events occurring with recorded human history.

The first, in 1563, succeeded a Phreatoplinian eruption centring on the volcano of Água de Pau. During this 1563 eruption, known as the Pico do Sapateiro or Queimado, basalt lava flows reached as far as Ribeira Seca, in the north coast. The second eruption, which started on 19 October 1652, resulted in the formation of three Trachyte domes and involved explosive phases of Vulcanian eruptions, by the time the eruptions end on 26 October 1652. This, more recent eruption, was a markedly eruptive/explosive event, composed of evolved magma that generally does not characterize the Picos region.

== Geography ==
The Picos fissural system is located in the central-western part of the island of São Miguel, delimited in the south-east by the caldera/massif of Sete Cidades and on the east by the Água de Pau Massif, running approximately 23 kilometres (14 mi) and extending to north and southern coasts. The landscape is dominated by the presence of approximately 300 monogenic cones, composed of scoria and lava flows. Similarly, the area is punctuated by maars, pumice cones and lava domes, in particular in the transitional zones between the adjacent central volcanoes.

The volcanostratigraphy of magmas/lava flows of the region include deposits between 2200 and 2800 years B.C., while radiometric deposits from the principal areas of population (Ponta Delgada) are from 12300 B.C.
