= Água Retorta =

- Civil parish
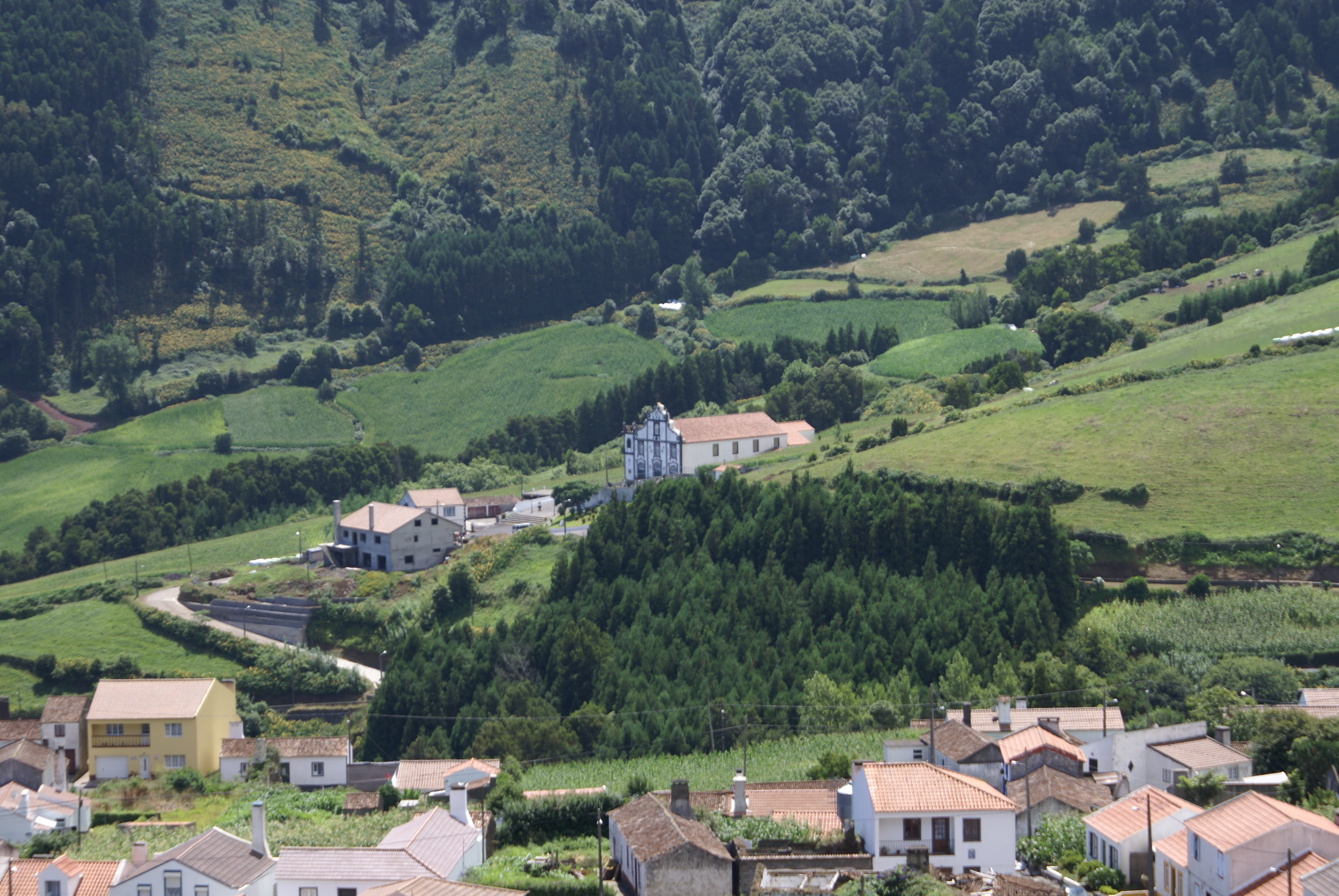
- A partial panorama of Água Retorta, looking towards the Church of Nossa Senhora da Penha da França

- Location of the civil parish of Água Retorta in municipality of Povoação
- Coordinates: 37°45′44″N 25°9′29″W
- Country: Portugal
- Auton. region: Azores
- Island: São Miguel
- Municipality: Povoação
- Established: Settlement: 15th century Parish: 17th century Civil parish: 3 July 1839

Area
  - Total: 12.55 km^{2} (4.85 sq mi)
- Elevation: 290 m (950 ft)

Population (2011)
  - Total: 489
  - Density: 39.0/km^{2} (101/sq mi)
- Time zone: UTC−01:00 (AZOT)
  - Summer (DST): UTC+00:00 (AZOST)
- Postal code: 9650-018
- Area code: 292
- Patron: Nossa Senhora da Penha de França
- Website: freguesiaaguaretorta.com

Água Retorta is a civil parish in the municipality of Povoação, on the island of São Miguel in the Portuguese archipelago of the Azores. The population in 2011 was 489, in an area of 12.55 km^{2}. Situated along the southeast coast, it is the smallest and most eastern parish in the municipality.

== History ==
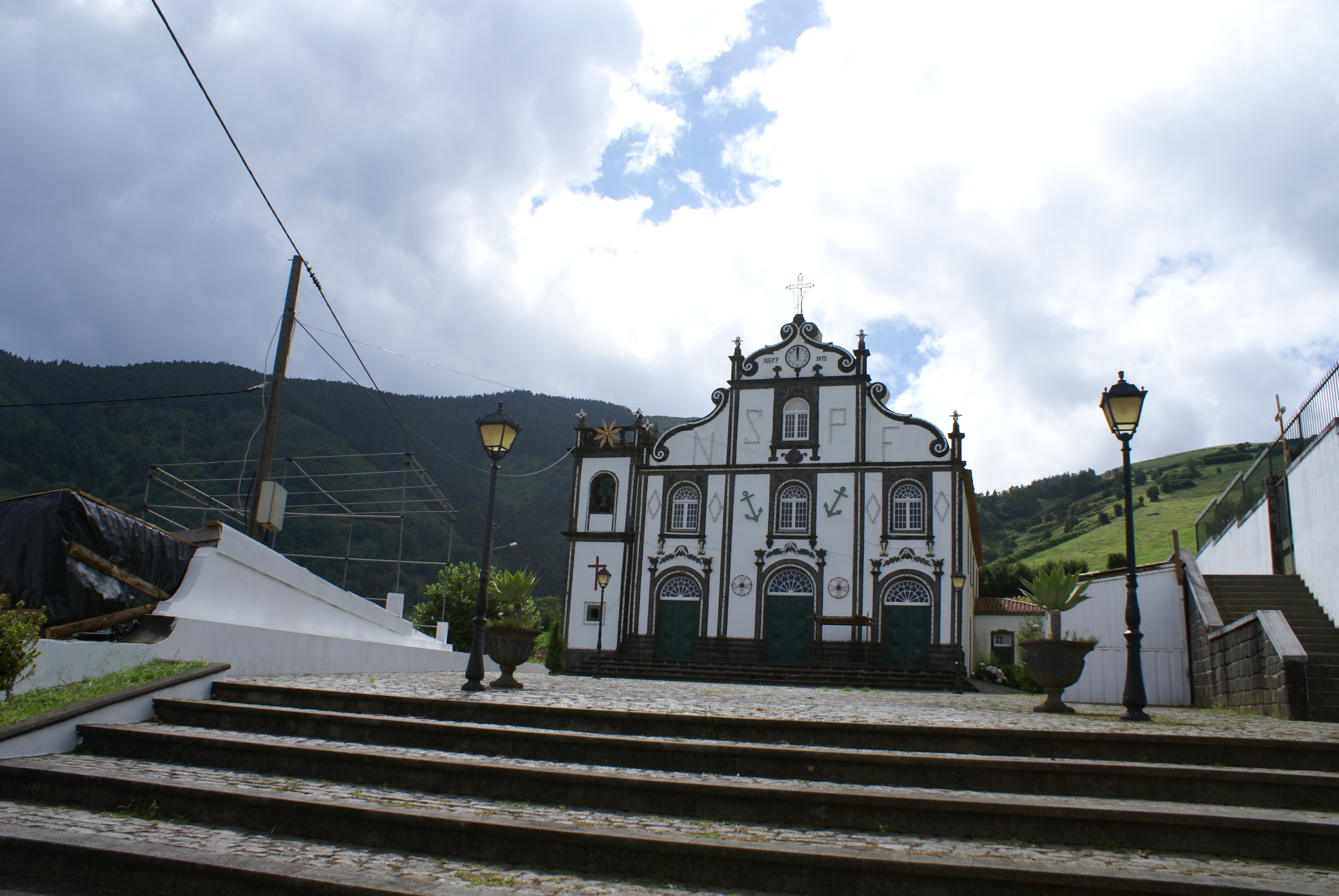
The Church of Nossa Senhora da Penha de França was erected to replace an older hermitage constructed after the early settlement.

The early settlement of Água Retorta, which had its origin with the settlement of Faial da Terra, occurred with the reestablishment of colonists from old Povoação. Água Retorta became important due to the abundance of farms that existed in this territory. The place name, as Gaspar Frutuoso wrote, was inspired by a ravine "that twisted and turned", that by the 16th century developed into a land of many farms. His description in Saudades da Terra: "From here progresses the lands of Nordeste, all in land of high cliffs, where two lengths below is the beach, called Água Retorta, because [the water] twists and turns". Paraphrasing Gaspar Frutuoso, Urbano de Mendonça Dias affirmed that the name was derived from the twists the ravine made, as it descended to rocks in the sea.

Friar Agostinho Montalverne identified the parish as falling within the jurisdiction of the local authority of Faial da Terra, and clergy of the ecumenical parish of Nossa Senhora da Graça. At that time, its vicar indicated the existence of 103 homes in the village, a population of 74, as well as a small hermitage dedicated to Nossa Senhora da Penha de França. This hermitage was founded by Pedro Barbosa da Silva, and constructed in 1871. In addition to this chapel, there existed another temple to the invocation of Nossa Senhora das Mercês, situated in Fajã do Calhau, on land that pertained to D. Ermelinda Pacheco Gago da Câmara, but which was destroyed during a storm in 1875.

Even by the 17th century, the citizenry of Água Retorta were ambitious to become an independent ecclesiastical parish, a fact that occurred by the end of that decade.

There is another location, Labaçal, important in the history of Água Retorta. It is situated within the vicinity of the parish, an area of approximately 500 alqueires of thicket, 400 metres (1,300 ft) above sea level.

On 3 July 1839, an official law 161 (dated 10 July 1839), decreed by Queen Maria II, elevated the Água Retorta to a civil parish, as well as the smaller hamlets Terra Chã, Lomba das Fagundas and Fajã do Calhau.

== Geography ==
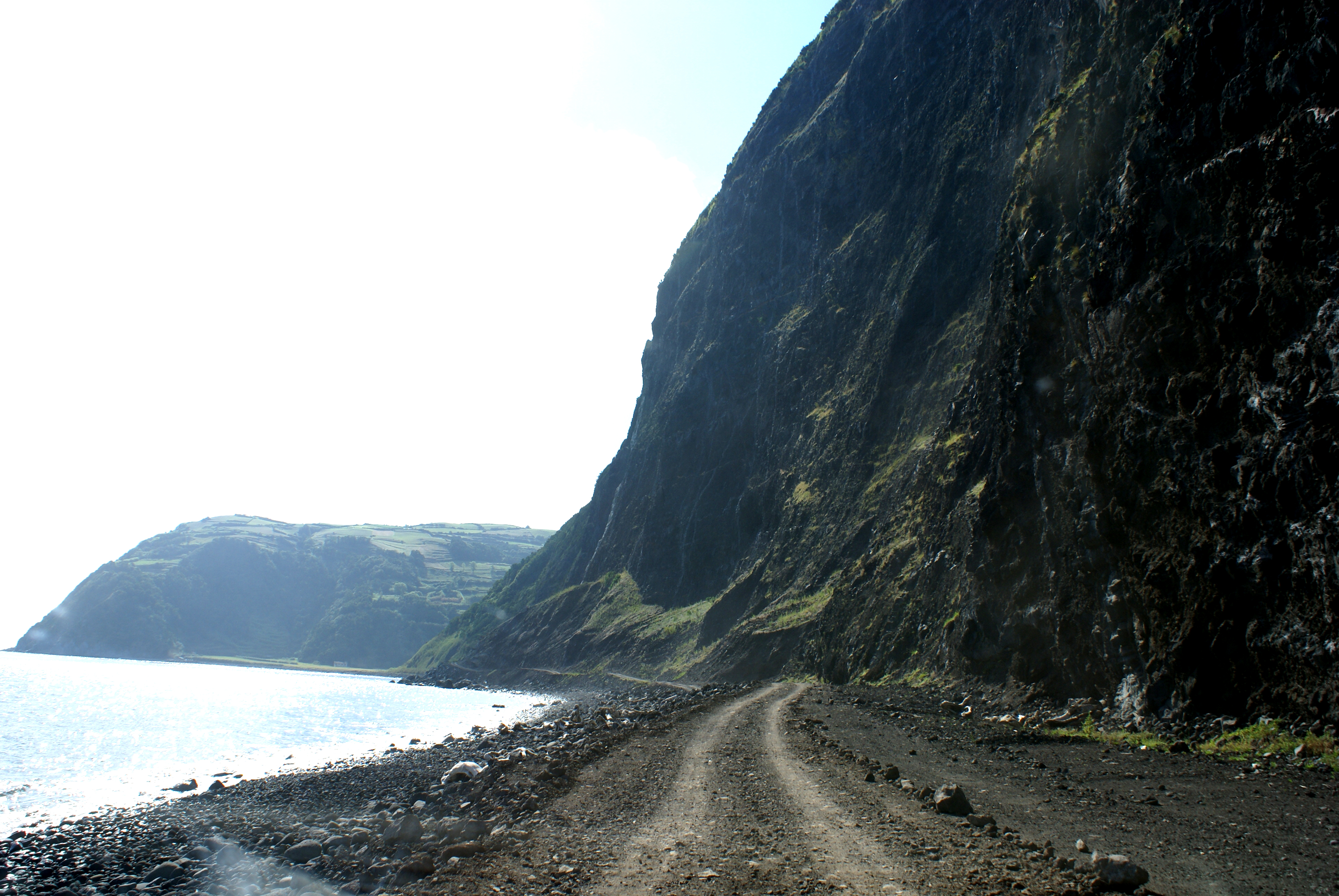
The cliffs of the Fajã do Calhau, separating the twin villages of Faial da Terra and Água Retorta

Água Retorta is located along the southeast corner of the island of São Miguel, within the municipality of Povoação, east of the municipality of Vila Franca do Campo, west of Nordeste, and south of Ribeira Grande. The community is connected by the Regional E.R.1-1ª Roadway directly to town of Nordeste and Faial da Terra, and through the mountains and valleys to the regional center of Ponta Delgada (some 75 kilometres (47 mi) away).

It consists of several smaller localities, along with the main village of Água Retorta: Terra Chã, Lomba das Fagundas and Fajã do Calhau.

After a certain time, the population of the parish began to emigrate to America, in search of better conditions. From the 1960 census, there were 1253 residents in the parish. Between 1960 and 1970 the population had decreased by 35%, the highest decrease in population on the island during that period. By 1981, there were 617 inhabitants (of which 183 families) residing in 378 homes, within the parish. By 2001, the parish counted 497 residents.

== Architecture ==
=== Civic ===
- Musical Society of Nossa Senhora da Penha da França (Portuguese: Sede da Sociedade Musical de Nossa Senhora da Penha da França), founded on 20 May 1947, by Duarte Raposo do Couto Resendes, Luís Pereira and José Raposo Carreiro, as a centre for musical study and recreation; its headquarters was constructed in 1962.

=== Religious ===
There are four teatros or impérios dedicated to the Cult of the Holy Spirit within the parish: three in Terra Chã and another in Lomba das Fagundas. The population continues to maintain the faithful tradition and devotion, with their annual feasts.

- Church of Nossa Senhora da Penha de França (Portuguese: Igreja de Nossa Senhora da Penha de França), constructed between 1871 and 1885, with the belltower an example of the original hermitage erected by Captain Pedro Barbosa da Silva, in the 17th century. The church is constructed of basalt and masonry, painted in white, with sculpted stone around the doorways, windows and belfry, in the Mannerist style typical of other Micalense churches.
