= Nuno Velho Cabral =

Portuguese nobleman

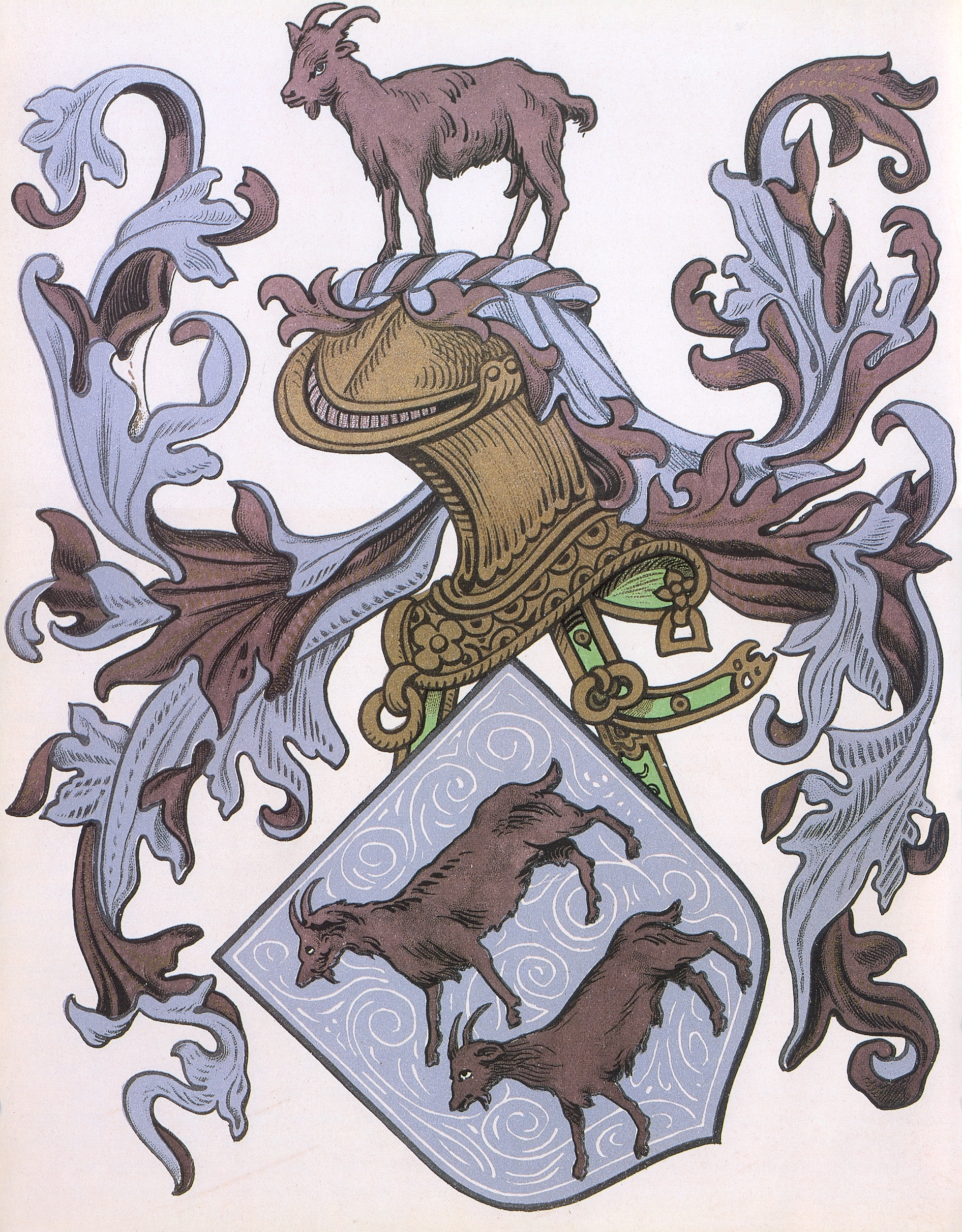
- Coat of arms of Cabral
- Full name: Nuno Velho Cabral de Travassos
- Born: 15th century Portugal
- Died: 15th century Portugal
- Noble family: Velho Cabral
- Spouse: Africa Annes

Nuno Velho Cabral or Travassos, (15th century) was a Portuguese nobleman, who served to the Kingdom of Portugal as conquistador and explorer. He accompanied his uncle Gonçalo Velho Cabral, in the voyage of discovery to Santa Maria and São Miguel Island, being one of the first settlers of Azores.

== Biography ==
Nuno was the son of Diogo Gonçalves de Travassos and Violante Alvares Cabral, a noble woman, daughter of Fernão Velho and Maria Alvares Cabral, great-aunt of Pedro Álvares Cabral. His wife was Africa Annes, daughter of Gonçalo Annes and Simôa de Sá, a distinguished family related to the first settlers of the Azores.
