= Água de Pau Massif =

Stratovolcano in São Miguel Island

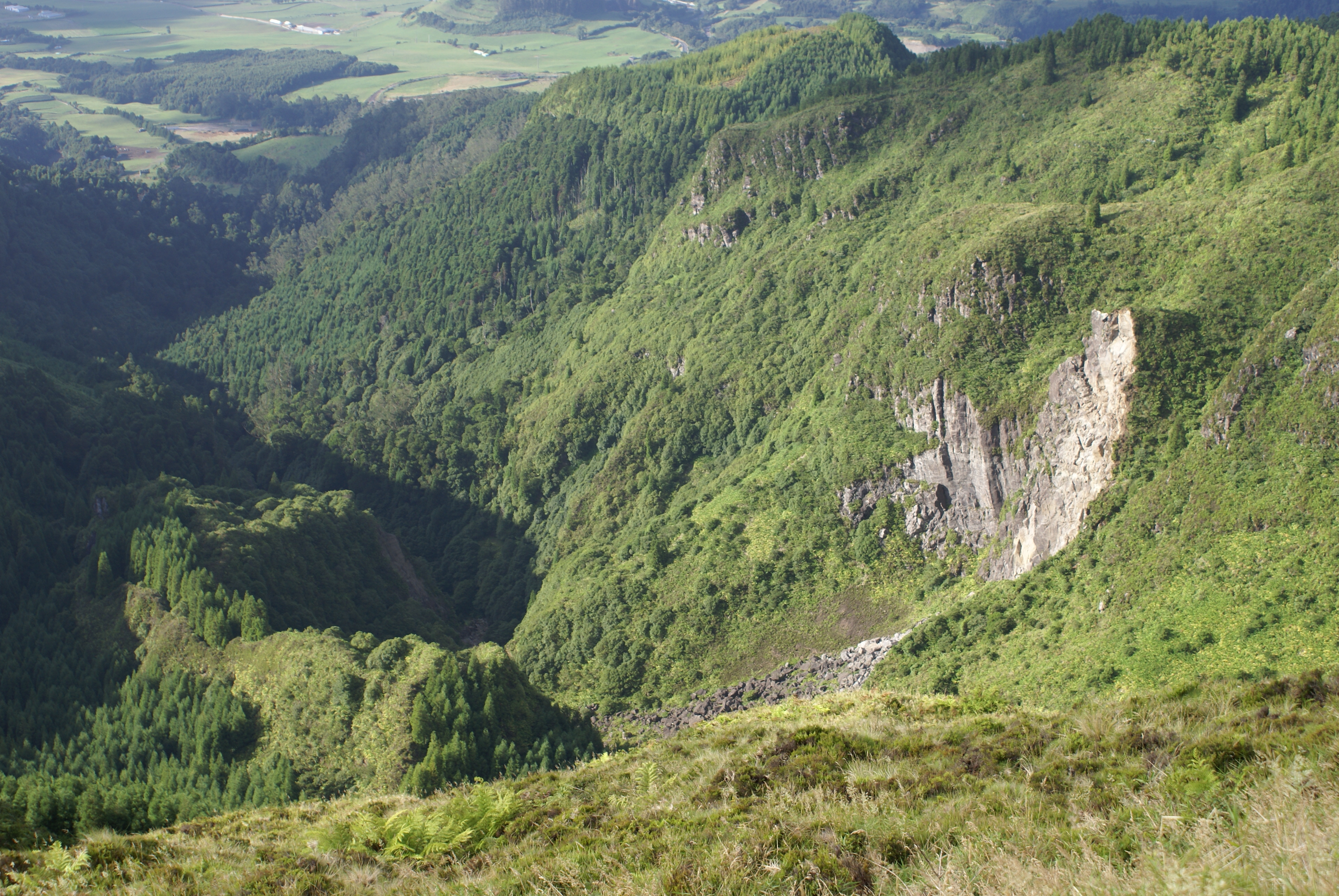
- A view of portion of the Inferior Complex of Água de Pau along the flanks of Ribeira Grande

Highest point
- Elevation: 947 m (3,107 ft)
- Coordinates: 37°46′N 25°28′W

Geography
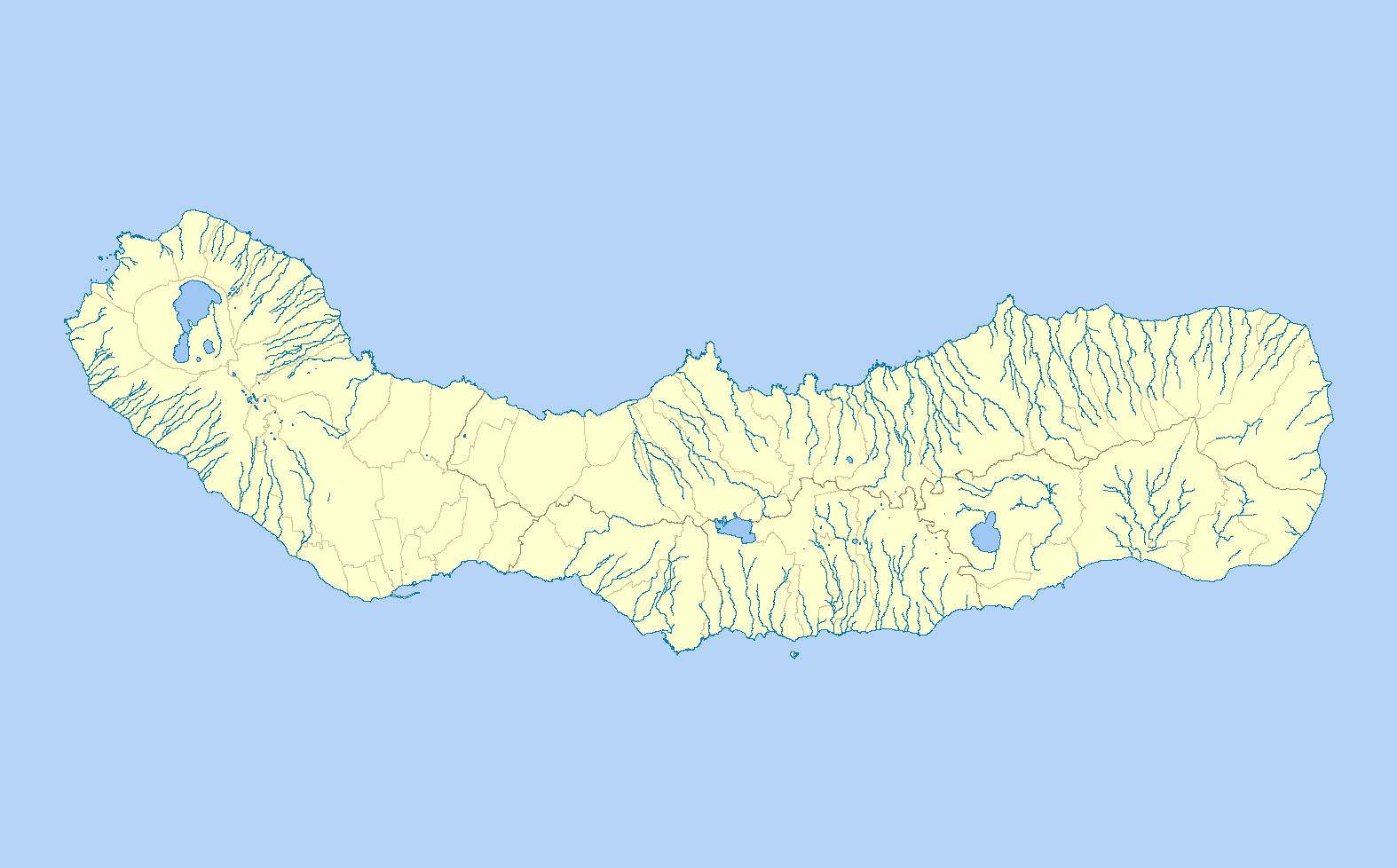
- Location within São Miguel
- Location: Eastern Group, Azores, Portugal
- Parent range: Azores Plateau

Geology
- Mountain type: Stratovolcano
- Rock type(s): Trachyte, Trachybasalt, Basalt
- Last eruption: 1652

Água de Pau Massif is a stratovolcanic complex, located in the central part of the island of São Miguel, in the Portuguese archipelago of the Azores. More recognizable for the Lagoa do Fogo at its centre, the volcanic complex includes centuries of geomorphological structures that include lava domes, cones and encrusted lava flows that have marked its history from, the last, 45,000 years BC.

== History ==
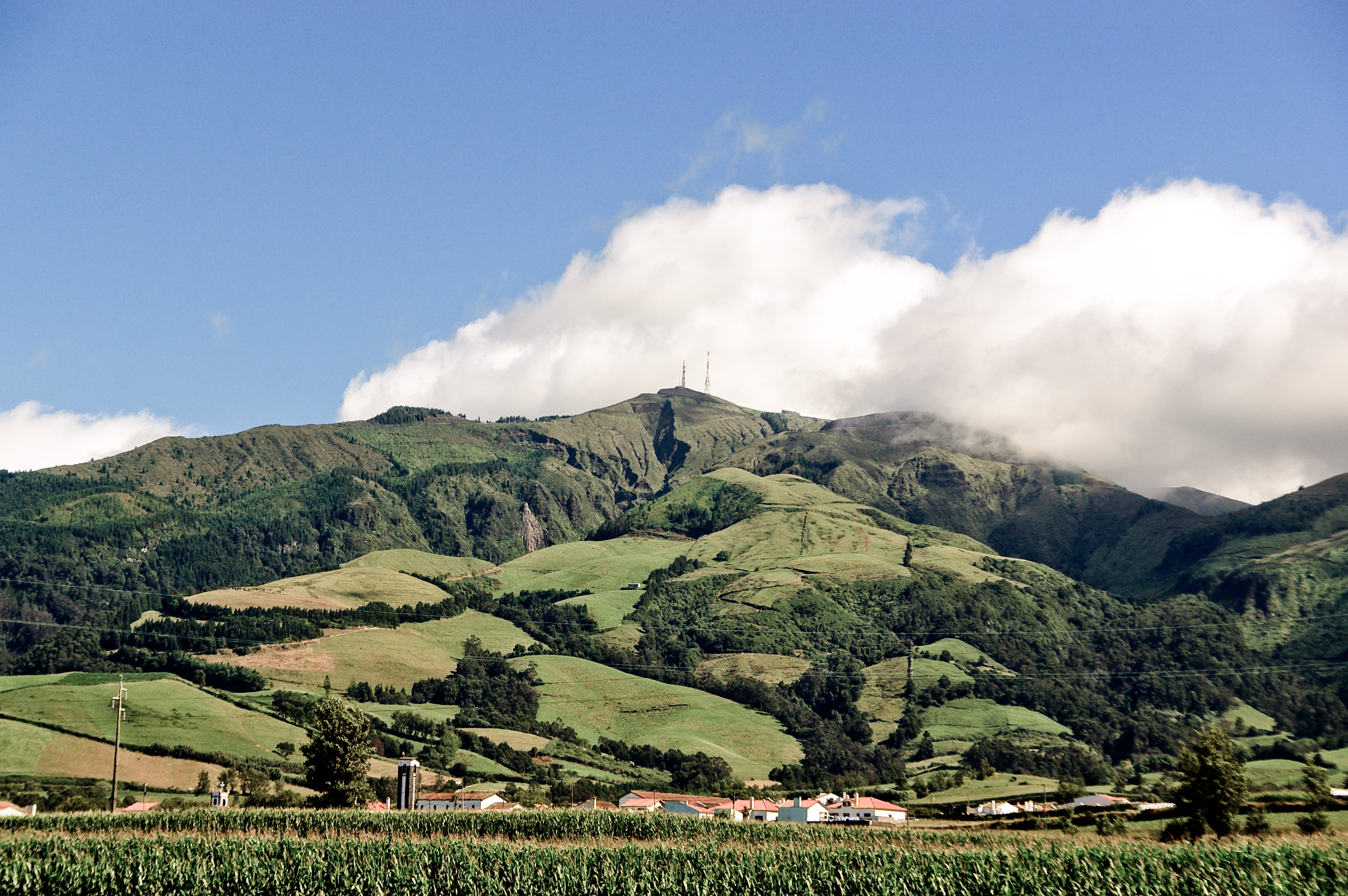
The northern flank, showing the rolling hills of the Inferior Complex near the parish of Santa Bárbara and the summit of Pico da Barrosa.

The outer caldera dates from between 30,000 and 45,000 years ago, and comprises an area 4 kilometres (2.5 mi) wide and 13 kilometres (8.1 mi) long outer caldera (corresponding to the Água de Pau Massif). The inner caldera, which is 2.5 kilometres (1.6 mi) wide and 3 kilometres (1.9 mi) long was formed about 15,000 years ago. It is the younger inner caldera that is partially filled by the crater lake Lagoa do Fogo.

Until about 5000 years ago, activity in the caldera created several lava domes on the northern and western flanks.

Some of the cinder cones on these flanks are marked by radial and concentric fissures and have been active within the last 5000 years. The region has been marked by five large eruptions, which included sub aerial events 1563, 1564 and 1652. The 1563 eruption, for example was characterized by a hydromagnetic event in the interior of the caldera, which was followed four days later by an effusive eruption, while the 1564 was an explosive hydromagmatic event.

Owing to the existence of hot springs along the northwest flank, particular in the so name Caldeiras da Ribeira Grande and Caldeira Velha, the region has been used in the generation of geothermal energy or as therapeutic tourist spas.

== Geography ==
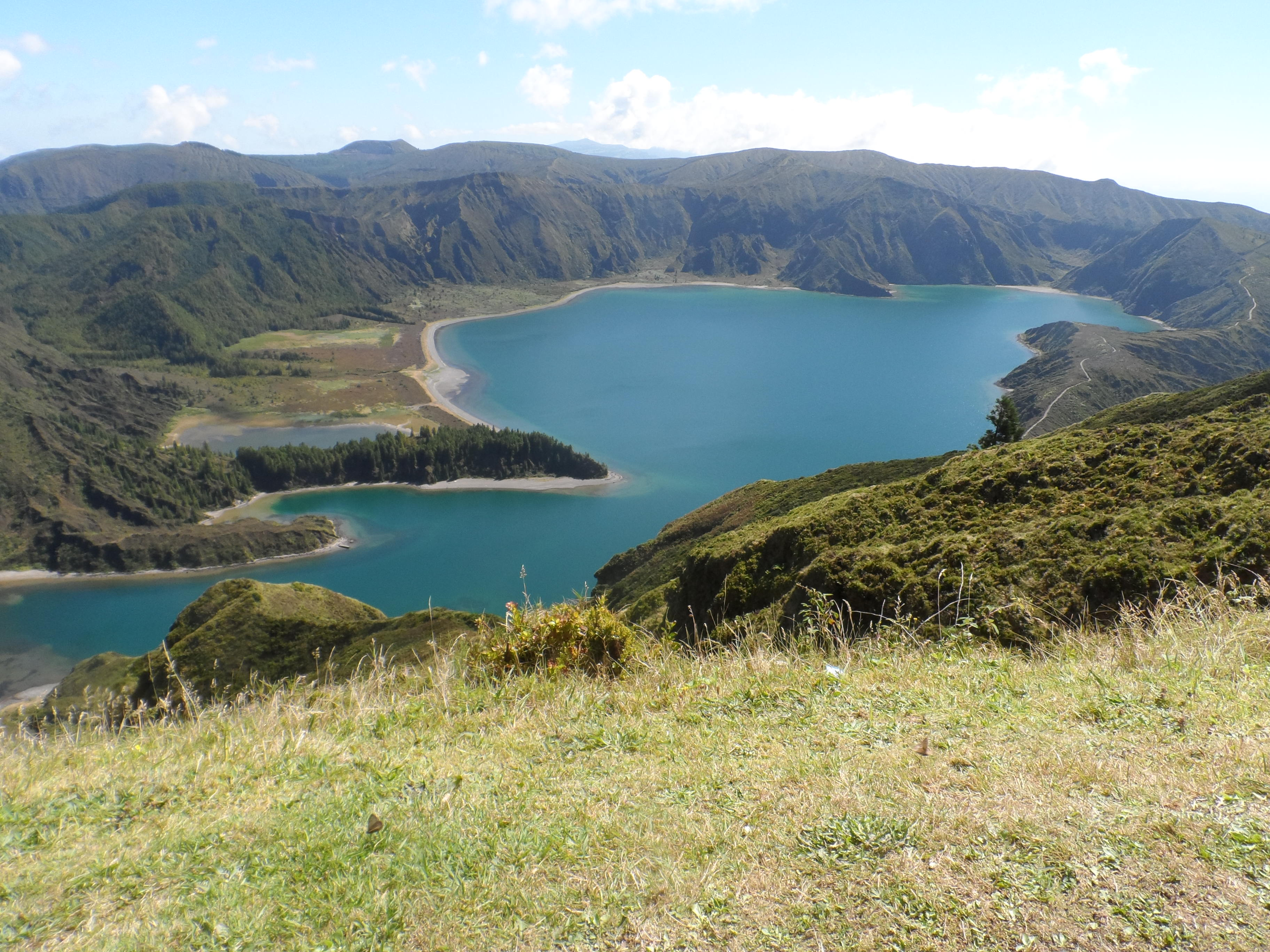
A view from Pico da Barrosa towards the central caldera of the Superior complex

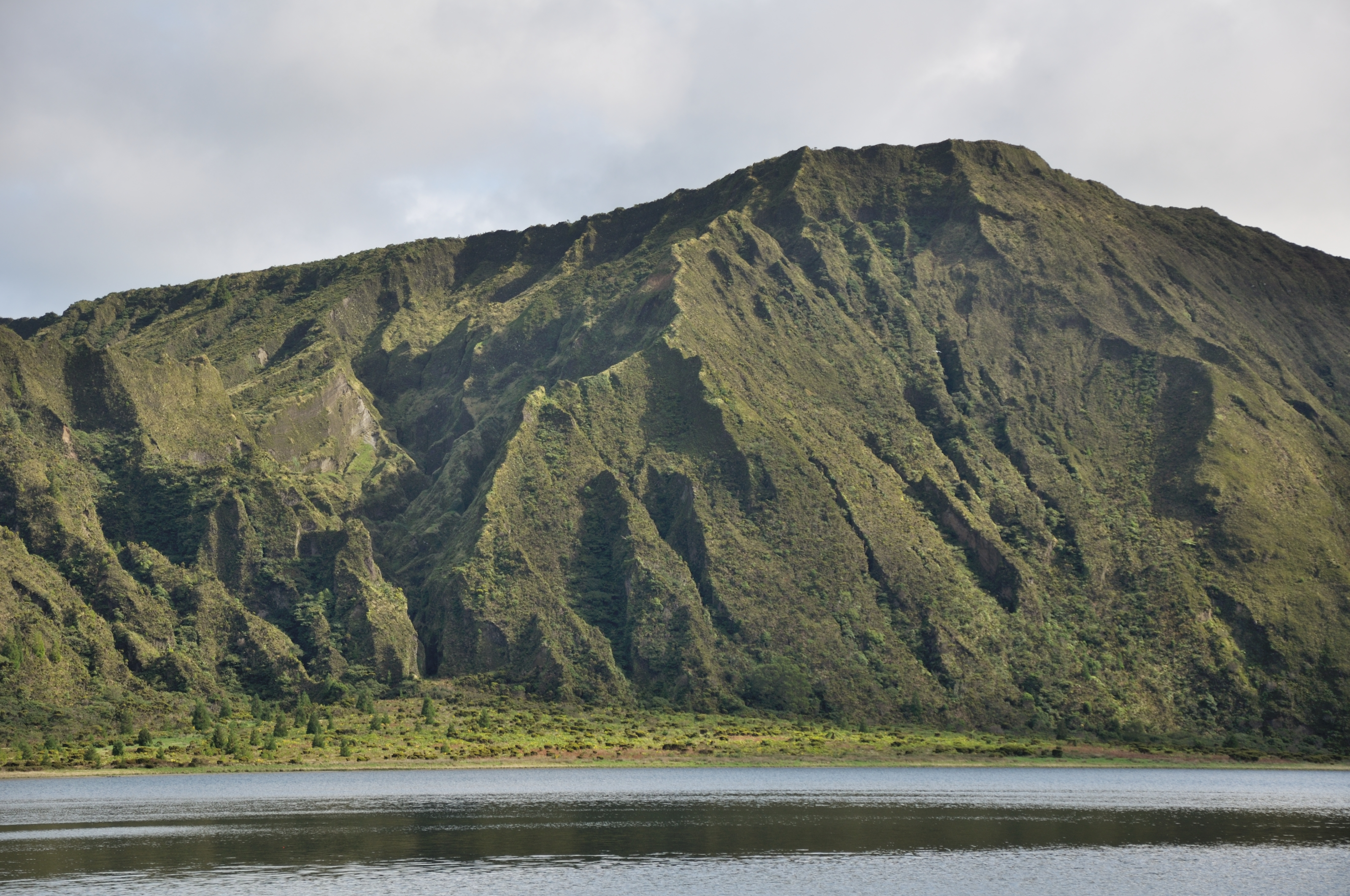
The view of the crater wall from the area of Lombadas

Situated in the central part of the island, Água de Pau corresponds to a central volcanic complex and caldera that includes a large lake, punctuated by lava domes and a pumice cone. On the flanks of the massif is the Ribeira Grande Graben, a tectonic structure oriented northwest-southeast, in addition to other regional fractures and radial faults that formed other scoria and pumice cones, or lava domes.

The stratigraphy of the Água de Pau Massif is complex, caused by a diverse volcanic activity over a period dated to 200,000 years. The history of its geological features is divided into two groups.

- The inferior group includes ancient material consisting of lava flows and trachyte pyroclastic deposits older than 40,000 years.
- The superior group covers volcanic products dating from the last 40,000 years. These consist of pyroclastic bombs and trachyte flows (pyroclastic and surge), mudflows and layered basalt rock, from phases associated with Plinian and sub-Plinian eruptions in the interior of the caldera. This group is divided into five formations: Roída da Praia (between 34,000 and 8,000 years ago), Ribeira Chã (created from abrupt eruption 8–12000 years ago), Fogo A (also from an abrupt eruption some 5000 years ago), Lombadas (a complex eruption of Fogo B, C and D sites) and geological eruptions occurring in the last 3000 years.

Among the various deposits Fogo A, which dates to roughly 5000 years, corresponds a clear stratigraphy of the island of São Miguel. The flanks of the massif are heavily eroded, with drainage confined to many valleys and gullies.

== See also ==
- List of volcanoes in Azores
