= Povoação (parish) =

- Civil parish
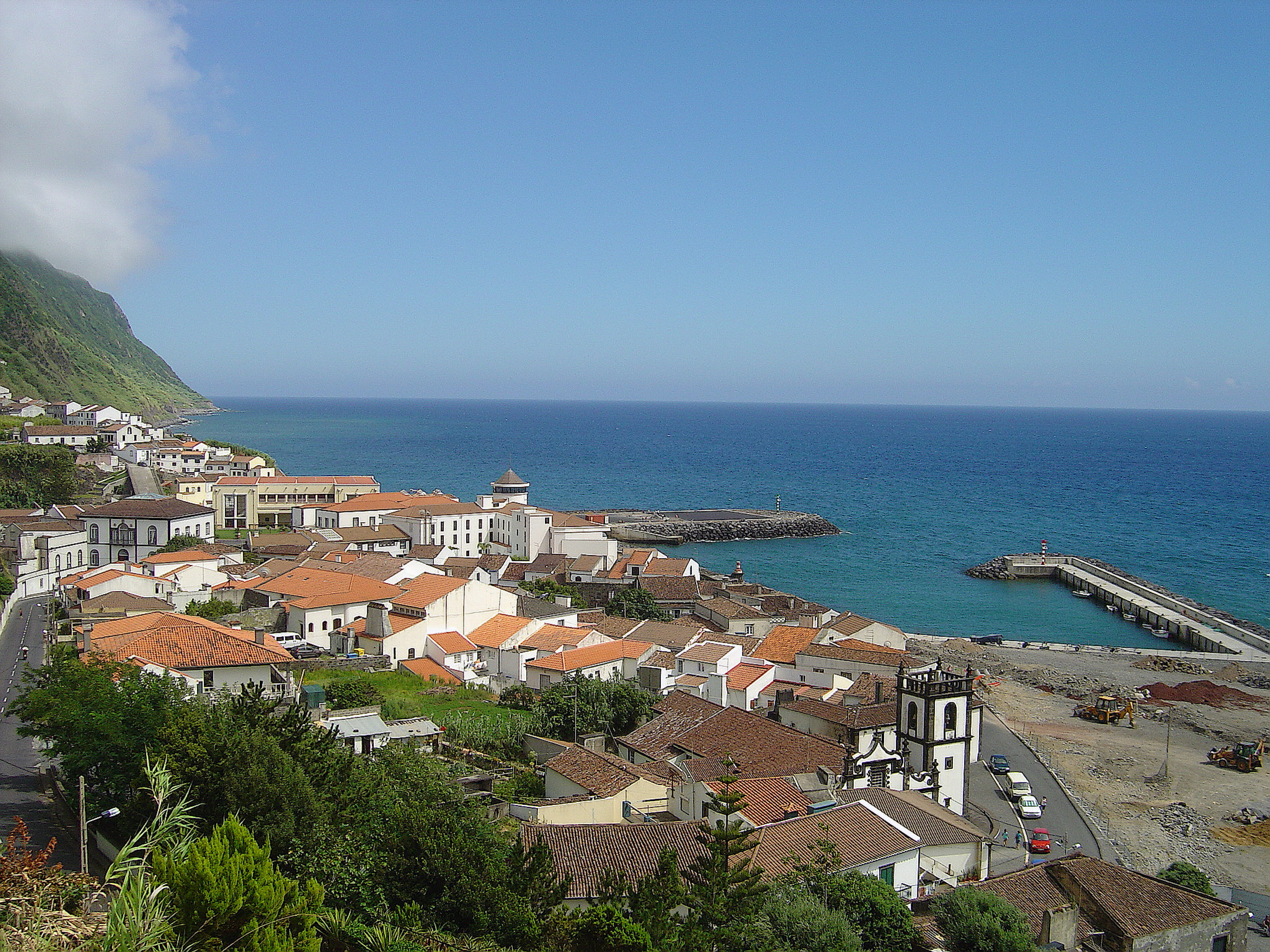
- The shoreline of the parish of Povoação, where the first settlers to the island of São Miguel disembarked

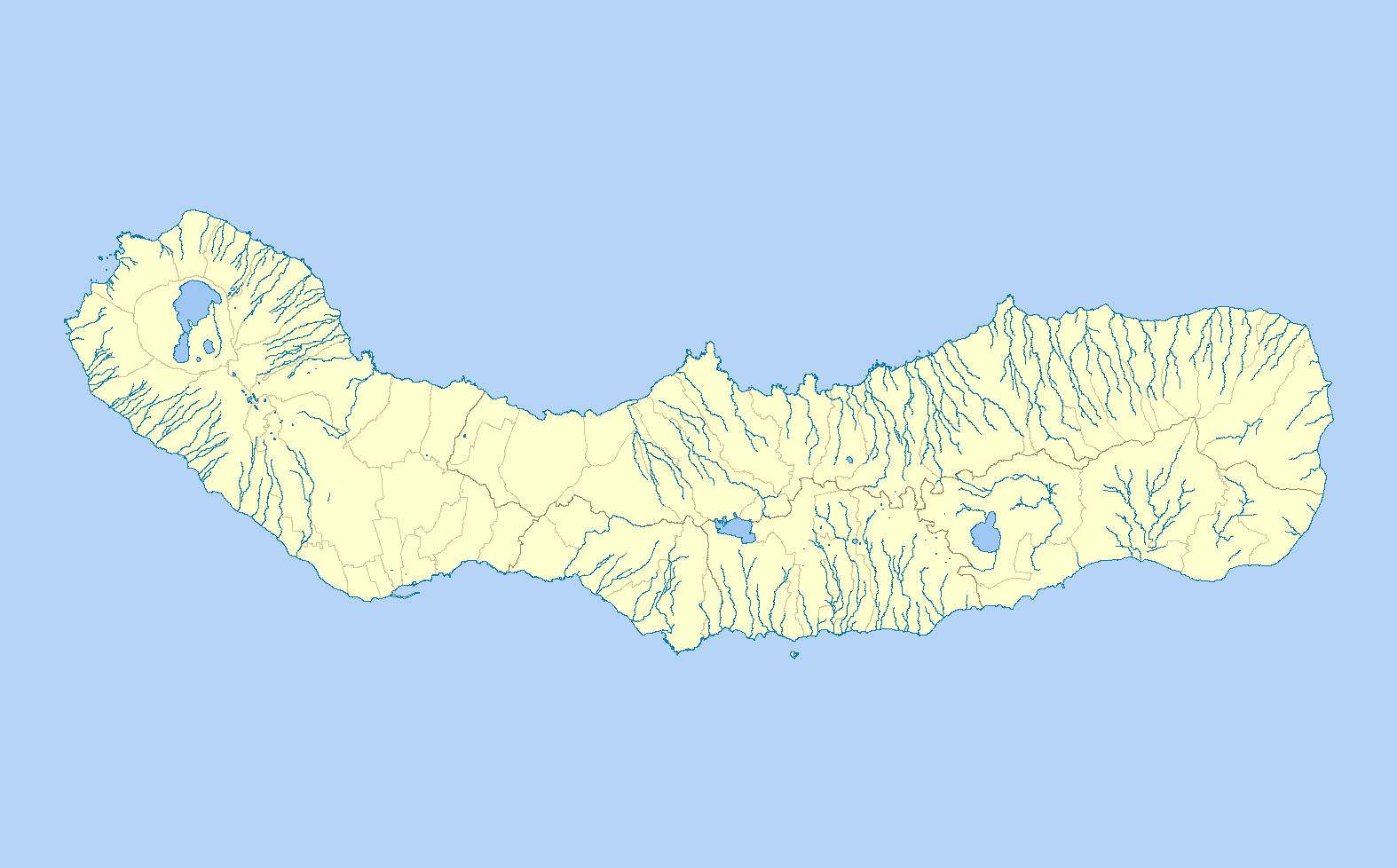
- Location in the Azores Povoação (São Miguel)
- Coordinates: 37°44′54″N 25°14′39″W
- Country: Portugal
- Auton. region: Azores
- Island: São Miguel
- Municipality: Povoação
- Established: Settlement: c. 1472

Area
  - Total: 26.23 km^{2} (10.13 sq mi)

Population (2011)
  - Total: 2,161
  - Density: 82.39/km^{2} (213.4/sq mi)
- Time zone: UTC−01:00 (AZOT)
  - Summer (DST): UTC+00:00 (AZOST)
- Postal code: 9650-426
- Area code: 292
- Patron: Nossa Senhora da Mãe de Deus
- Website: www.jf-povoacao.com

Povoação is a civil parish in the municipality (concelho) of Povoação, on the island of São Miguel in the Portuguese archipelago of the Azores. The population in 2011 was 2,161, in an area of 26.23 km^{2}.

== History ==
Colonization of the island is commonly associated with the settlement of Povoação Velha, the first colony on the island of São Miguel. "Arriving here on the island, the nine discoverers took land in the place where today we call Povoação Velha for which they made later...and, disembarked between two fresh ravines of clear, sweet and cold waters, (the Ribeira de Além and the Ribeira de Pelames) between the cliffs and high lands, (Morro de Santa Bárbara and Lomba dos Pós) all covered in greenery of cedro, laurel, ginger and faias, and other diverse". From the beginning, the locality impressed the settlers, since it was abundant in vegetation, to them indicating a fertile land. Settlement, therefore, progressed from this point on the island: they transported cattle, wheat seed, legumes and agricultural implements.

The parish church, dedicated to Nossa Senhora da Mãe de Deus (Our Lady The Mother of God), was constructed from 24 July 1848, and emblematic for is gilded wood altarpieces and the image of its patron.

On 4 July 1865 the parish council building was first inaugurated, later to be the site of the municipalities local government.

== Economy ==
For a long time the fertility of the lands within the Povoação crater made the region recognized as the cereal center of the island.

== Architecture ==
=== Civic ===
- Discoverers' Gate (Porta dos Descobrimentos), located on the coast, it is the presumed location that the first discoverers and settlers disembarked on the island at the end of the 1440s.
- District Court of Povoação (Portuguese: Tribunal da Comarca de Povoação)
- Municipal Council of Povoaçao (Paços do Concelho da Povoação), today the main building for the entire municipality, the square building was inaugurated in the 19th century;
- Sub-Regional Hospital of Povoação (Portuguese: Hospital Sub-Regional de Povoação)

=== Religious ===
- Church of Nossa Senhora da Mãe de Deus (Portuguese: Igreja Paroquial de Povoação/Igreja da Mãe de Deus), inaugurated on 24 July 1848, it is prized for the gild work and historic image of its patron saint;
- Church of Nossa Senhora de Rosário (Portuguese: Igreja de Nossa Senhora do Rosário na Praça Velha), most commonly known as the Igreja Velha (the Old Church), it was constructed in 1745, on the precise site that the hermitage and cemetery of Senhora da Consolação (Our Lady of Consolation) was erected;
- Hermitage of Santa Bárbara (Portuguese: Ermida de Santa Bárbara)
