= São José (Ponta Delgada) =

- Civil parish
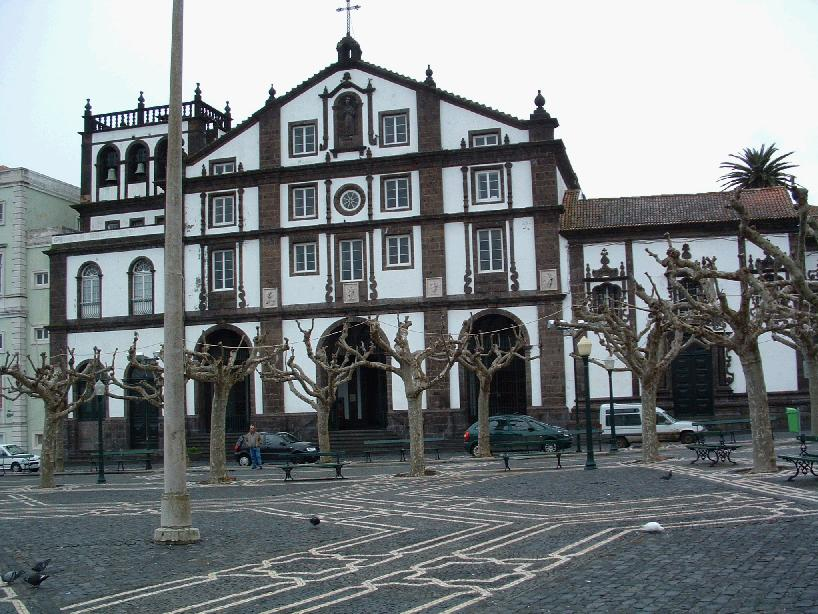
- The Matriz Church of São José, located in the Campo do São Francisco, one of the central buildings in São José

- The location of the civil parish of São José within the municipality of Ponta Delgada
- Coordinates: 37°44′28″N 25°40′32″W
- Country: Portugal
- Auton. region: Azores
- Island: São Miguel
- Municipality: Ponta Delgada

Area
  - Total: 1.66 km^{2} (0.64 sq mi)
- Elevation: 22 m (72 ft)

Population (2011)
  - Total: 5,934
  - Density: 3,570/km^{2} (9,260/sq mi)
- Time zone: UTC−01:00 (AZOT)
  - Summer (DST): UTC+00:00 (AZOST)
- Postal code: 9500-216
- Area code: 292
- Patron: São José

São José is a civil parish in the municipality of Ponta Delgada on the island of São Miguel in the Portuguese archipelago of the Azores. It is one of the constituent parts of the city of Ponta Delgada, and location of many of the island's more significant cultural and historical, commercial and residential buildings. Extending a short distance along the coast it, nevertheless includes a large mixed urban-rural constituency from the shore north to the main freeway, the Via-Rápida. The population in 2011 was 5,934, in an area of 1.66 km^{2}.

== History ==
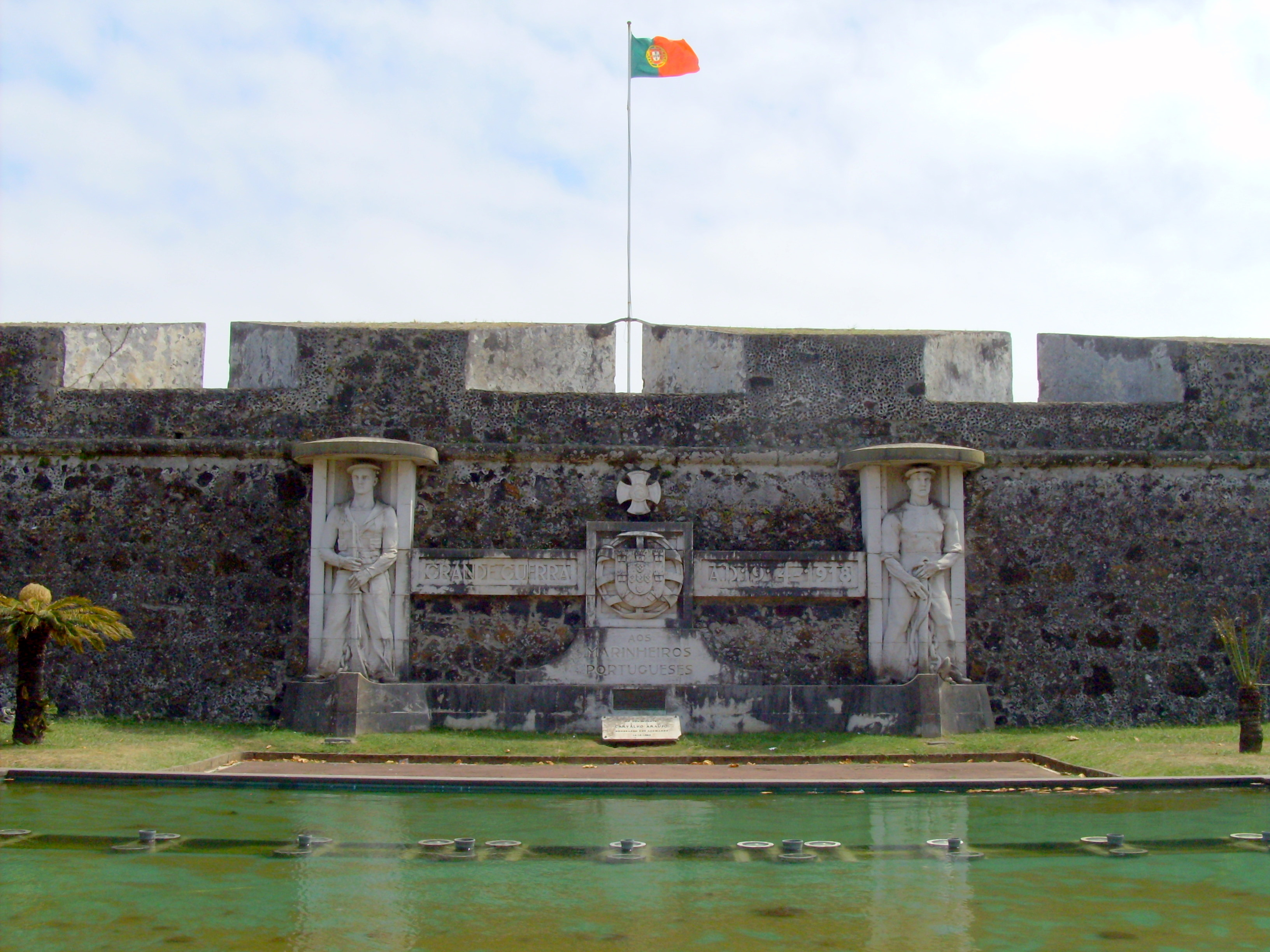
The Fort of São Brás guarding the port of Ponta Delgada.

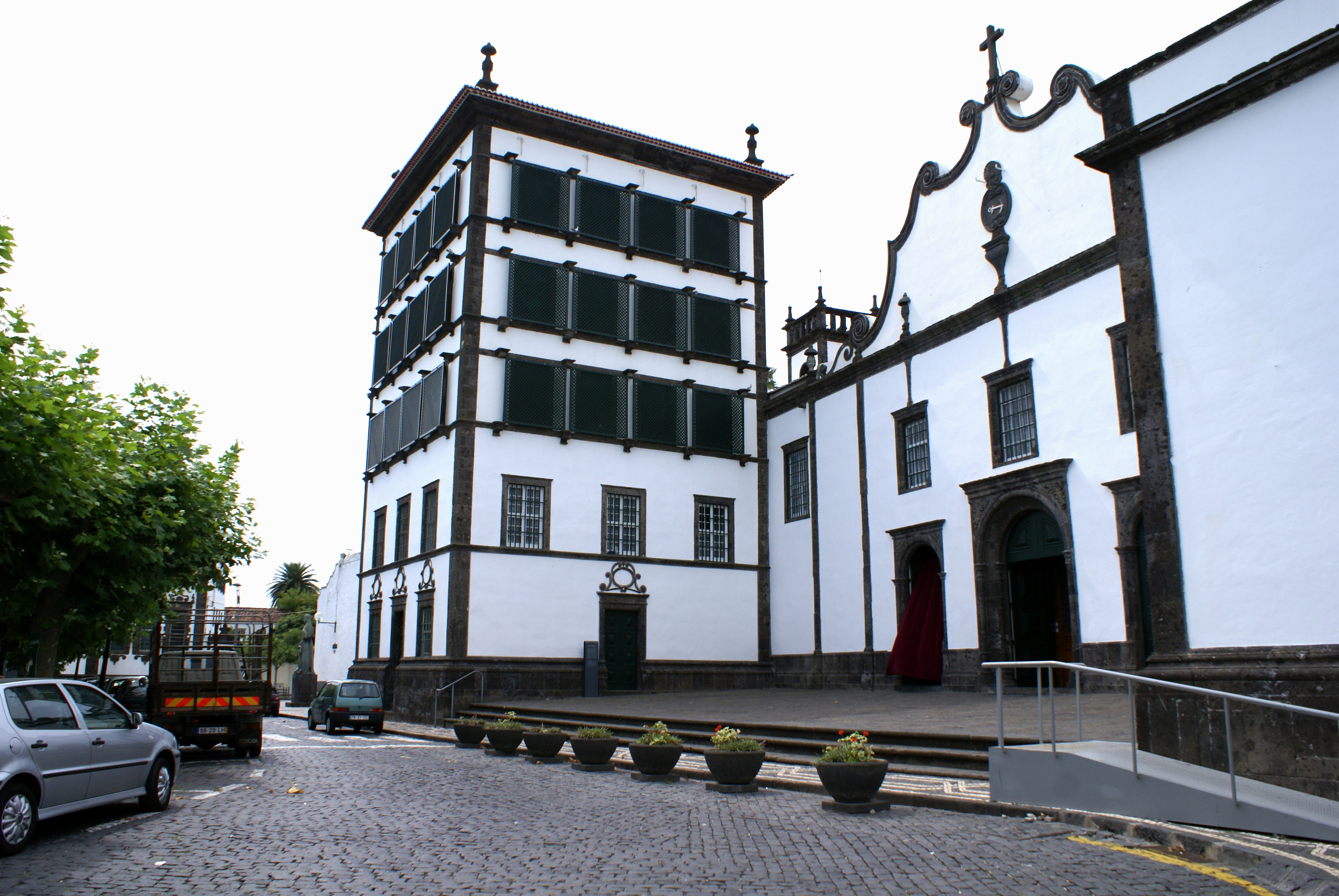
The Convent of Our Lady of Hope is the devoted Sanctuary of the Lord Holy Christ of the Miracles.

Historically, the region of the parish of São José was the dropping-off point for the settlers to the western part of the island. Its past is naturally confused with the history of Ponta Delgada, or Ponta de Santa Clara, in the writings of Gaspar Frutuoso, which was transformed into town by King Manuel I of Portugal in 1499. Later it was elevated to the status of city in 1546, under the decrees of John III of Portugal.

In July 2002, owing to the population and administrative issues, the civil parish of Santa Clara separated from São José.

On 20 March 2009, the local government authority inaugurated symbolically, during the celebrations of the feast day of the local patron saint, its parish seat on the Rua da Lisboa. This event which included representatives of the regional authority, former politicians (such as João Bosco Mota Amaral) and municipal council (such as the President Berta Cabral), was celebrated with blessings from deacon José Garcia, speeches, plaque unveiling and presentation of a photographic gallery of former notable figures from the parishes history and past parish presidents.

== Geography ==
Its urban extent, which extends into the new parish of Santa Clara, is one of the most built-up regions, preserving a patrimonial identity that is multi-secular, that includes administrative, political, military and religious buildings. Its territory of approximately 1.6 km^{2} is wedged between Santa Clara, Arrifes, São Sebastião and the ocean.

== Architecture ==
One of the historical centres of the island of São Miguel, São José was one of the early settlement destinations. As a result, the streets of the parish are occupied by several buildings of significant historical and/or cultural significance:

=== Civic ===
- Customshouse of Ponta Delgada (Portuguese: Alfândega de Ponta Delgada)
- District Courthouse of Ponta Delgada (Portuguese: Tribunal da Comarca de Ponta Delgada)
- Manorhouse of Nossa Senhora do Parto (Portuguese: Solar de Nossa Senhora do Parto/Pousada da Juventude)
- Manorhouse of Santa Catarina (Portuguese: Solar Santa Catarina)
- Manorhouse of the Count (Portuguese: Solar do Conde/Centro Municipal de Cultura)
- Palace of Conceição (Portuguese: Convento da Conceição/Palácio da Conceição/Sede do Governo Regional dos Açores)
- Palace of Fonte Bela (Portuguese: Convento da Conceição/Palácio da Conceição/Sede do Governo Regional dos Açores)
- Residence Largo 5 de Outubro, 15–19 (Portuguese: Prédio no Largo 5 de Outubro, nº.15–19)
- Residence Rua Agostinho Pacheco, 15–20 (Portuguese: Imóvel na Rua Agostinho Pacheco nº.15–20)
- Residence Rua Marquês da Praia e Monforte, 12–36, including old Granary (Portuguese: Prédio na Rua Marquês da Praia e Monforte, n.º12–36, incluindo o antigo Granel)
- Residence Rua Marquês da Praia e Monforte, 33–37 (Portuguese: Prédio na Rua Marquês da Praia e Monforte, nº.33–37)

=== Military ===
- Captaincy of Ponta Deglada (Portuguese: Edifício do Comando da Defesa Marítima de Ponta Delgada)
- Castle of the António Borges Garden (Portuguese: Castelo no Jardim Botânico António Borges)
- Fort of São Brás (Portuguese: Castelo de São Brás/Forte de São Brás)

=== Religious ===
- Church of Nossa Senhora da Conceição (Portuguese: Igreja de Nossa Senhora da Conceição)
- Church of São José (Portuguese: Igreja de São José)
- Convent of Esperança (Portuguese: Convento da Esperança)

== Notable citizens ==
- António Borges da Câmara Medeiros (Fajã de Baixo, 14 June 1812 – Ponta Delgada, 18 March 1879), a property-owner, businessman and Azorean politician;
- Luís Soares de Sousa (Ponta Delgada, 16 October 1846 – Ponta Delgada, 10 February 1901), businessman, Republican politician and benefactor;
- José Bensaúde (c. 1835 – c. 1922), industrialist and businessman
- José Joaquim de Sena Freitas (Ponta Delgada, 27 July 1840 – Rio de Janeiro, 21 December 1913), a priest, orator and publicist responsible for public works involving questions of religion and morals, who quarrelled with Portuguese and Brazilian intelecturals and journalists;
- Joaquim Teófilo Fernandes Braga (São José (Ponta Delgada) 24 February 1843 – Lisbon, 28 January 1924) was a Portuguese writer, playwright, politician and the leader of the Republican Provisional Government after the abdication of King Manuel II
- Domingos Maria Xavier Rebelo (Ponta Delgada, 3 December 1891 – Lisbon, 11 January 1975), better known as Domingos Rebelo, was a teacher and Azorean regionalist painter, author of many iconographic representations of the Azores, in particular his painting Os Emigrantes, his most recognizable image (of immigrants on the dock of Ponta Delgada);
- João Bosco Soares da Mota Amaral (born 15 April 1943), is a politician, serving as the first President of the Autonomous Regional Government of the Azores from 1976 to 1995.
