= Santa Bárbara (Ponta Delgada) =

- Civil parish
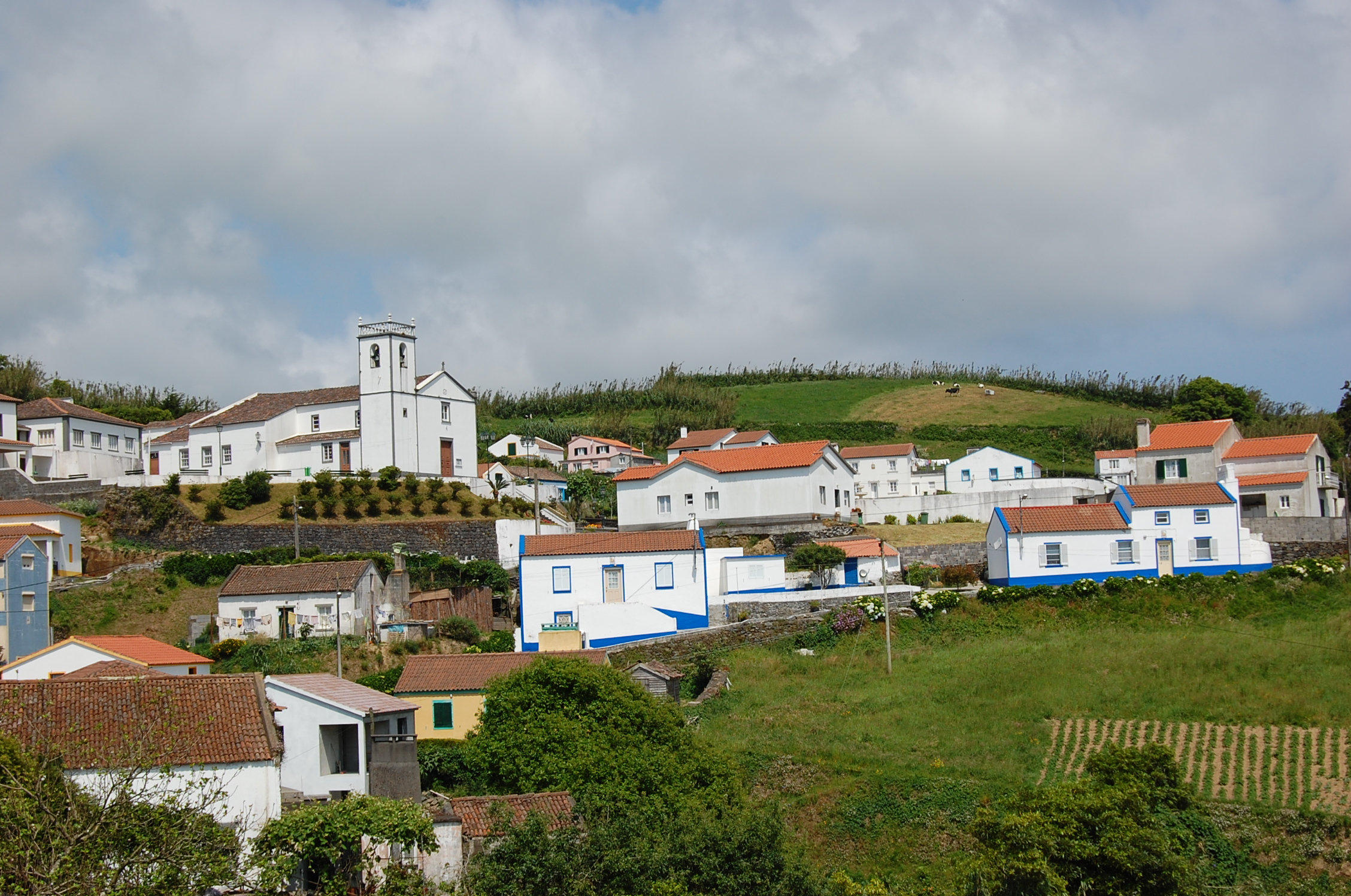
- The landscape of Santa Bárabara on the slopes of the Sete Cidades massif

- The location of the civil parish of Santa Bárbara in the municipality of Ponta Delgada
- Coordinates: 37°52′28″N 25°43′34″W
- Country: Portugal
- Auton. region: Azores
- Island: São Miguel
- Municipality: Ponta Delgada
- Established: Settlement: fl. 1600; Parish: 1 April 1986

Area
  - Total: 8.72 km^{2} (3.37 sq mi)
- Elevation: 247 m (810 ft)

Population (2011)
  - Total: 855
  - Density: 98.1/km^{2} (254/sq mi)
- Time zone: UTC−01:00 (AZOT)
  - Summer (DST): UTC+00:00 (AZOST)
- Postal code: 9545-321
- Area code: 292
- Patron: Santa Bárbara

Santa Bárbara is a civil parish in the municipality of Ponta Delgada on the Portuguese island of São Miguel in the Azores. The population in 2011 was 855, in an area of 8.72 km². Santa Barbara is a relatively young administrative entity, established in 1986, being de-annexed from the neighboring parish of Santo António.

== Geography ==
Santa Bárbara is sandwiched between Santo António (along the east and south), Remédios in the northwest, Sete Cidades to the southwest, and the Atlantic Ocean to the north. It is located in the northwestern part of the island of São Miguel. Apart from its church (to the invocation of Santa Bárbara), along with a few small commercial businesses, there is a restaurant and a local soccer field.
