= Santa Clara (Ponta Delgada) =

- Civil parish
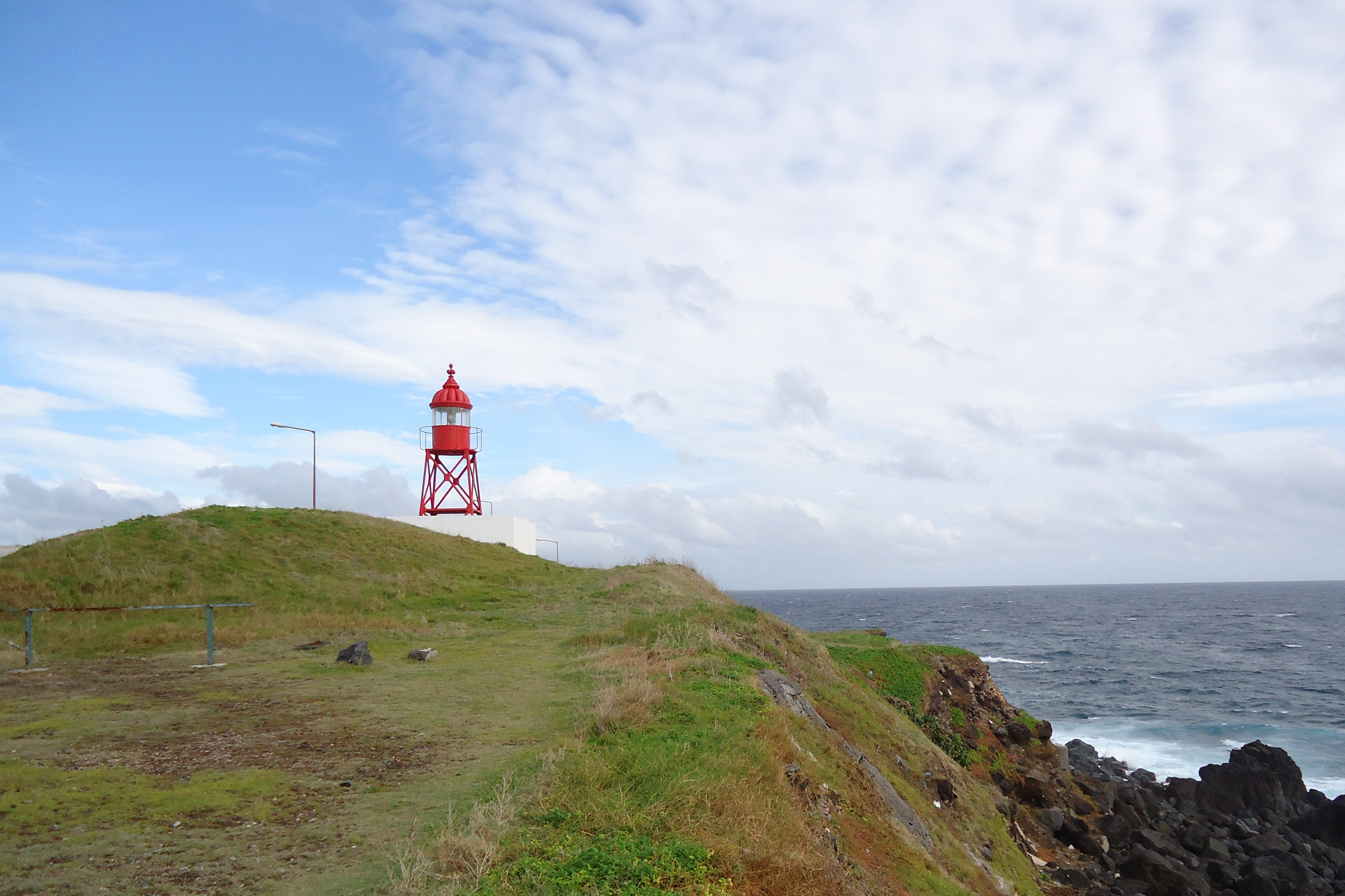
- The famous Santa Clara lighthouse (that was once situated on the Tower of Belém) the ex-libris of the small parish

- Location of the civil parish of Santa Clara in the municipality of Ponta Delgada
- Coordinates: 37°44′13″N 25°40′57″W
- Country: Portugal
- Auton. region: Azores
- Island: São Miguel
- Municipality: Ponta Delgada
- Established: Settlement: c. 1458; Parish: c. 1580; Civil parish: July 2002

Area
  - Total: 2.24 km^{2} (0.86 sq mi)
- Elevation: 21 m (69 ft)

Population (2011)
  - Total: 2,971
  - Density: 1,330/km^{2} (3,440/sq mi)
- Time zone: UTC−01:00 (AZOT)
  - Summer (DST): UTC+00:00 (AZOST)
- Postal code: 9500-241
- Area code: 292
- Patron: Saint Clare
- Website: www.freguesiadesantaclara.pt

Santa Clara (Saint Clare) is a civil parish in the municipality of Ponta Delgada (São Miguel) in the Portuguese archipelago of the Azores. The population in 2011 was 2,971, in an area of 2.24 km².

== History ==
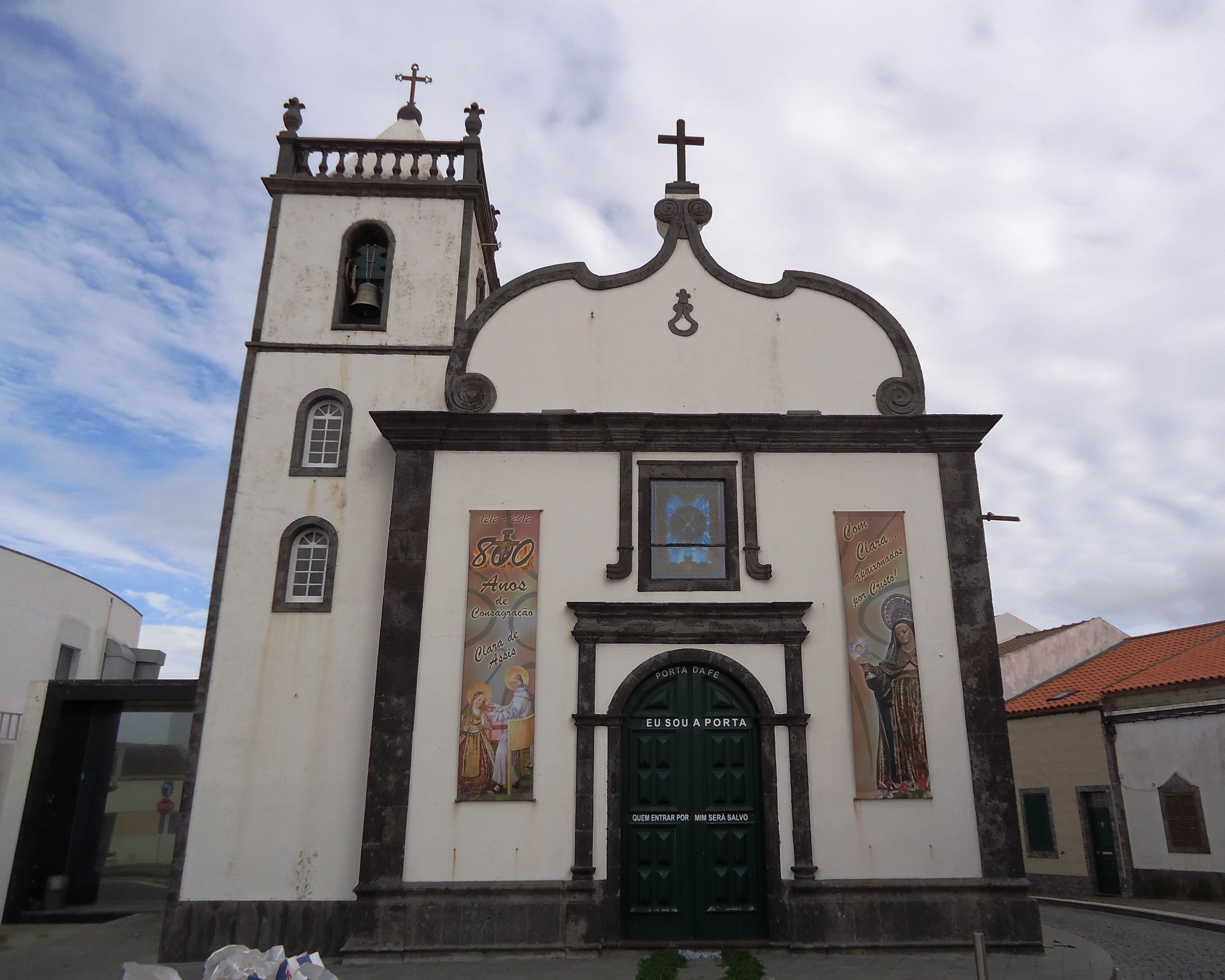
The parochial Church of Santa Clara situated a short distance from where its predecessor once stood

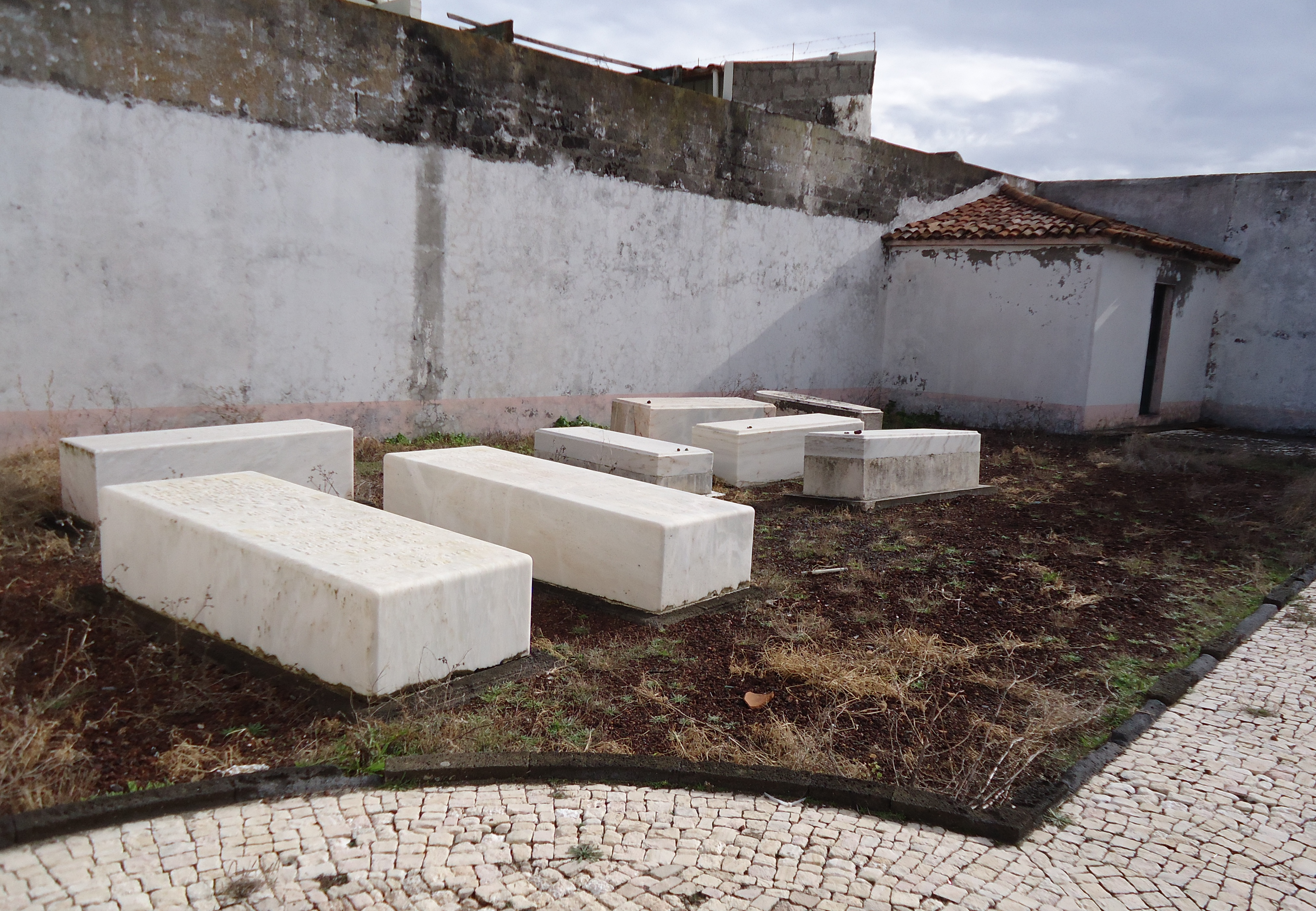
The gravestones in the Hebrew Cemetery of Ponta Delgada, resting place of the small community beginning in 1834

When Vila Franca do Campo was the principal centre of São Miguel, the area known as Ponta Delgada was the beginning of a vast hunting area populated by numerous "wild" mountain pigs. At the edge of this region, was the homestead of Francisco Ramalho, and was considered a starting point for huntsmen from Vila Franca. This embryonic site became the foundation of the village of Santa Clara; it was an important reference in the southwest part of the island, a determinant factor in the location and orography of the locality, combined with a cove and stone beach that later became known as "Ponta Delgada". The long, narrow basalt promontory, helped to protect the area from the undulation of Atlantic swells known as the Cunhal da Maré. The promontory helped to create a protected anchorage, that was absent along the coast until Vila Franca in the west. Many of the huntsmen that accompanied the noblemen from Vila Franca would eventually settle along the routes, creating a small nucleus. alongside farmers and fisherman.

With the growing settlement came the influence of the Church. After the construction of a temple in honour of the Franciscan Order of Poor Clares the area began to be referred to as Santa Clara. The small hermitage, its date of construction nor its location, are still unknown, apart from this reference:

In addition, a short distance from the fortress to the west, is a small point called "Ponta dos Algares"...and then a small sandy bay, fronting the houses of the generous and in all things grandioso Francisco Arruda da Costa...and in great cost his walls and corbels, with his date to the sea, everything quite defensible and placed with the gate called "Santa Clara", because there existed the parochial church of this Saint.

At the time, and before it was partially destroyed by the installation of a railline to support the construction of the port, the eastern cove of Ponta Delgada was far deeper, and was situated by Gaspar Frutuoso. The temple, as Frutuoso explained, existed since 1522, and was implanted a short distance from the current church. The reference to a pebble beach, in the bay [of Ponta dos Alagres], situated in front of the property of Francisco Arruda da Costa, suggests that the remains of the small castelinho, supports many of the early descriptions. The small fort would, originally, have been situated over the clifftop walls over the coast, which were common to early island forts. The military redoubt, constructed in the 16th-17th century (with its first repair in 1643) was an important bastion in the defense of the zone, and one of the oldest populated spaces.

It was Bishop D. Pedro de Castilho, Bishop of Angra who determined the creation of a third parish in Ponta Delgada. Reference to the new ecumenical parish date to this period:

...the third parish, newly made, in Santa Clara, before being expanded, had 62 homes, with 297 confessed souls, of whom there was almost 203 who had taken communion.

In 1581, D. Pedro de Castilho, visited the hermitage in Santa Clara, insisting on a baptismal font for the new parish, and owing expanding the parishes borders towards the east. The ecumenical parish of Santa Clara persisted during prelature of Bishop Gaspar de Faria, with its seat in the hermitage of its invocation (which already existed prior to 1522, when the earthquake caused major upheavals). But, following the first quarter of the 17th century, the parish of Santa Clara changed its denomination to São José (encompassing a larger part of Ponta Delgada as the bishop had envisioned), and the original hermitage in the zone subsisted with a single member of the curia.

With the accompanying settlement of the territory, agriculture and fishing became a dominant part of the settlement in the region. By the beginning of the first quarter of the 20th century, there continued to operate windmills and milling stones in the lowlands, to catch the wind and support the pasturelands. The great change came with the transformation caused by the construction of the artificial port of Ponta Delgada, at the end of 1861, resulting in the migration of stonemasons and construction workers, along with their families to the coastal zone. Santa Clara, then primarily a fishing community, began to become a neighbourhood of poor workers. Between the 19th and 20th century, now with the port functioning, the locality continued to attract workers due to the implantation of industrial companies.

The road to revive Santa Clara from a small village locality into a civil parish began with Father Fernando Vieira Gomes“de Santa Clara”, who ran a silent campaign beginning in the middle of the 1950s (beginning with Decree 7 May 19579. The long tedious process lasted most of his life, and only came to fruition with the election of its first parish organs on 9 October 2005. The proposal to reestablish Santa Clara as civil parish began with a proposal on 16 July 2001, approved as decree law on 10 July 2002, when it was formally de-annexed from the western part of the civil parish of São José.

== Geography ==
Santa Clara is an industrial zone located on the western periphery of Ponta Delgada, extending from the area around the port of Ponta Delgada, to the eastern frontier of Relva.

== Sport ==
By the beginning of the 20th century, the working poor of the parish were more inclined toward their chores and daily tasks, and had little time for relaxation or leisure. But, at the same time they were dedicated to sport, especially football, as evident by the arrival of the game in São Miguel and the appearance of the campeonatos de Santa Clara (Santa Clara Championships), which helped to foster and develop the game. Regular organized practice and games began in the second decade of the 20th century, and more so following the departure of American forces stationed at Field Azores in the Mata da Doca following the First World War.

The evolution of the sport resulted in the appearance of the Santa Clara Foot-ball Club, which was presented to the public in October 1922, and became one of the founding members of the Ponta Delgada Football Association in April of the following year. At one time there were three football teams in the parish: Santa Clara Foot-ball Club, Sport Club Santa Clara and the Clube Desportivo Santa Clara. But, it was the latter, since 29 July 1927, that has remained, ultimately advancing to the national division.
