= Conceição Palace, Ponta Delgada =

Palace in Ponta Delgada, seat of the government of the Azores

Coordinates: 37°44′24″N 25°40′21″W

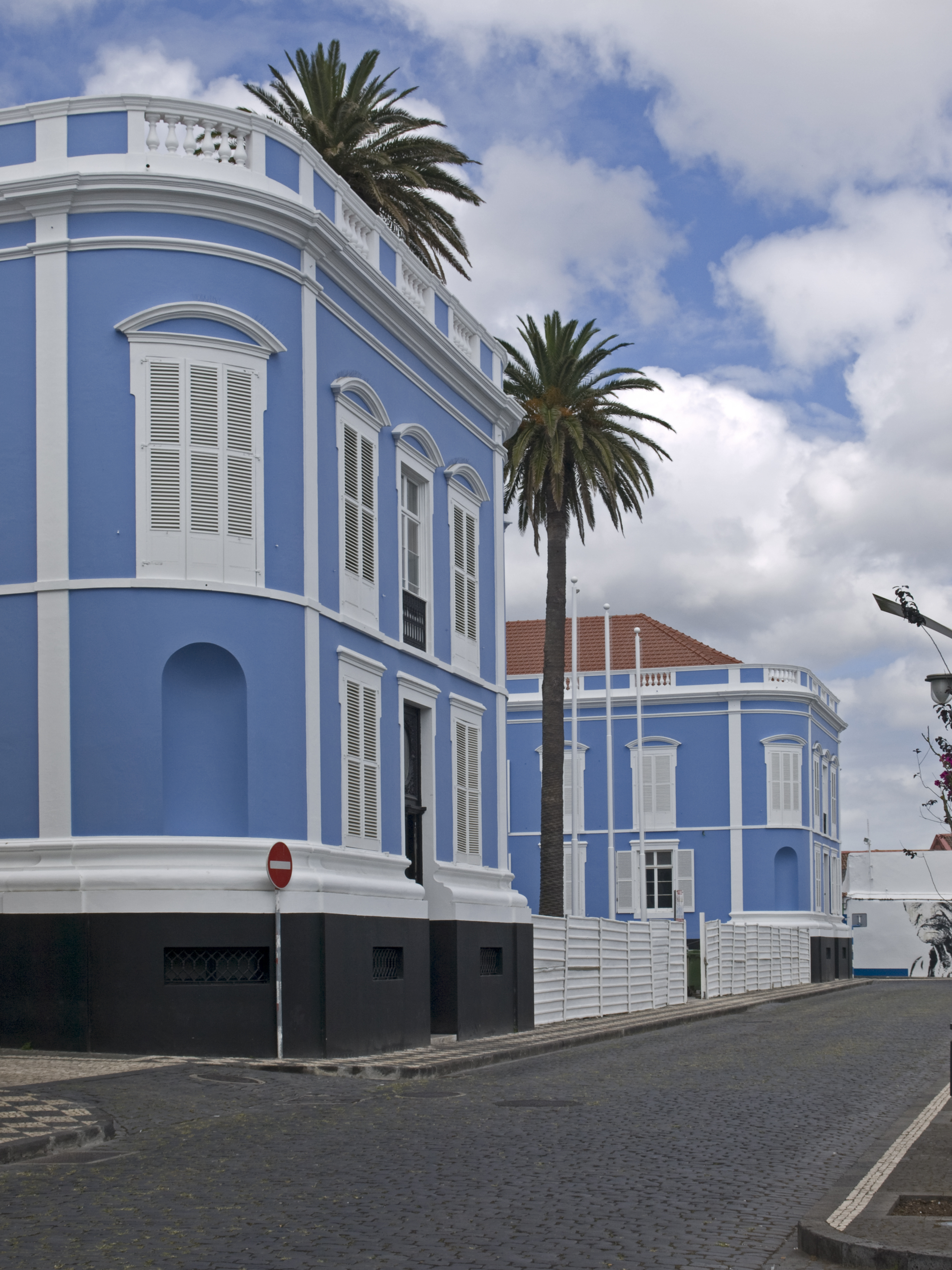
A corner of Conceição Palace

Conceição Palace (Portuguese: Palácio da Conceição) is a building in the historic center of Ponta Delgada, Azores, Portugal. It was declared a national monument in 1981.

The palace was constructed in the end of the 19th century. The name means "Conception" and refers to the Convent of the Immaculate Conception which occupied this quarter before the construction of the palace. Some of the buildings belonging to the monastery were preserved and integrated to the complex of the palace. The most notable of these is the Church of the Immaculate Conception, built in the end of the 17th century in the baroque style.

The palace is occupied by the headquarters of the Regional Government of the Azores. It is one of the so called Palaces of the Presidency.
