= Santo António (Ponta Delgada) =

- Civil parish
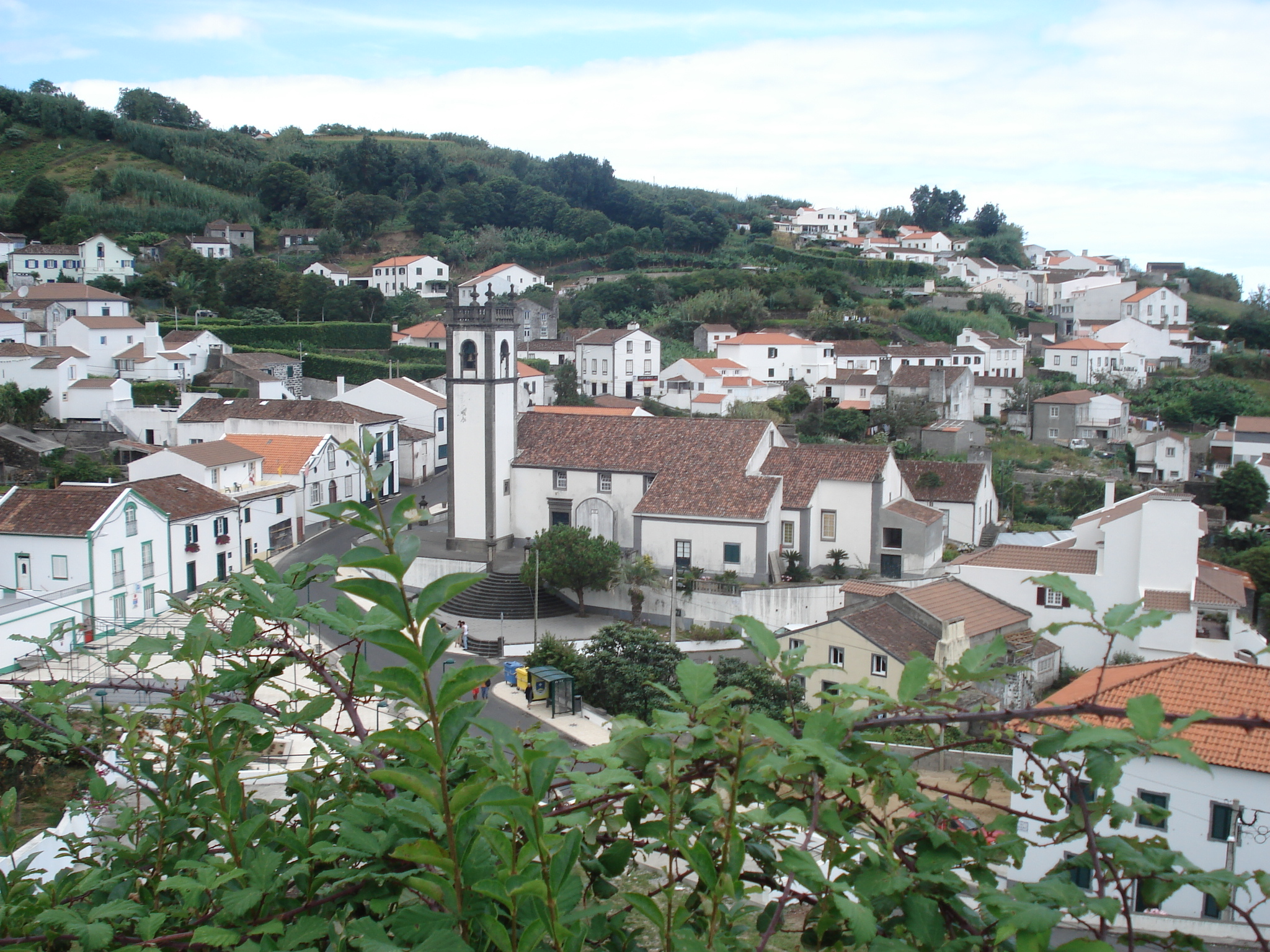
- Santo António, with the parochial church central to the residential homes

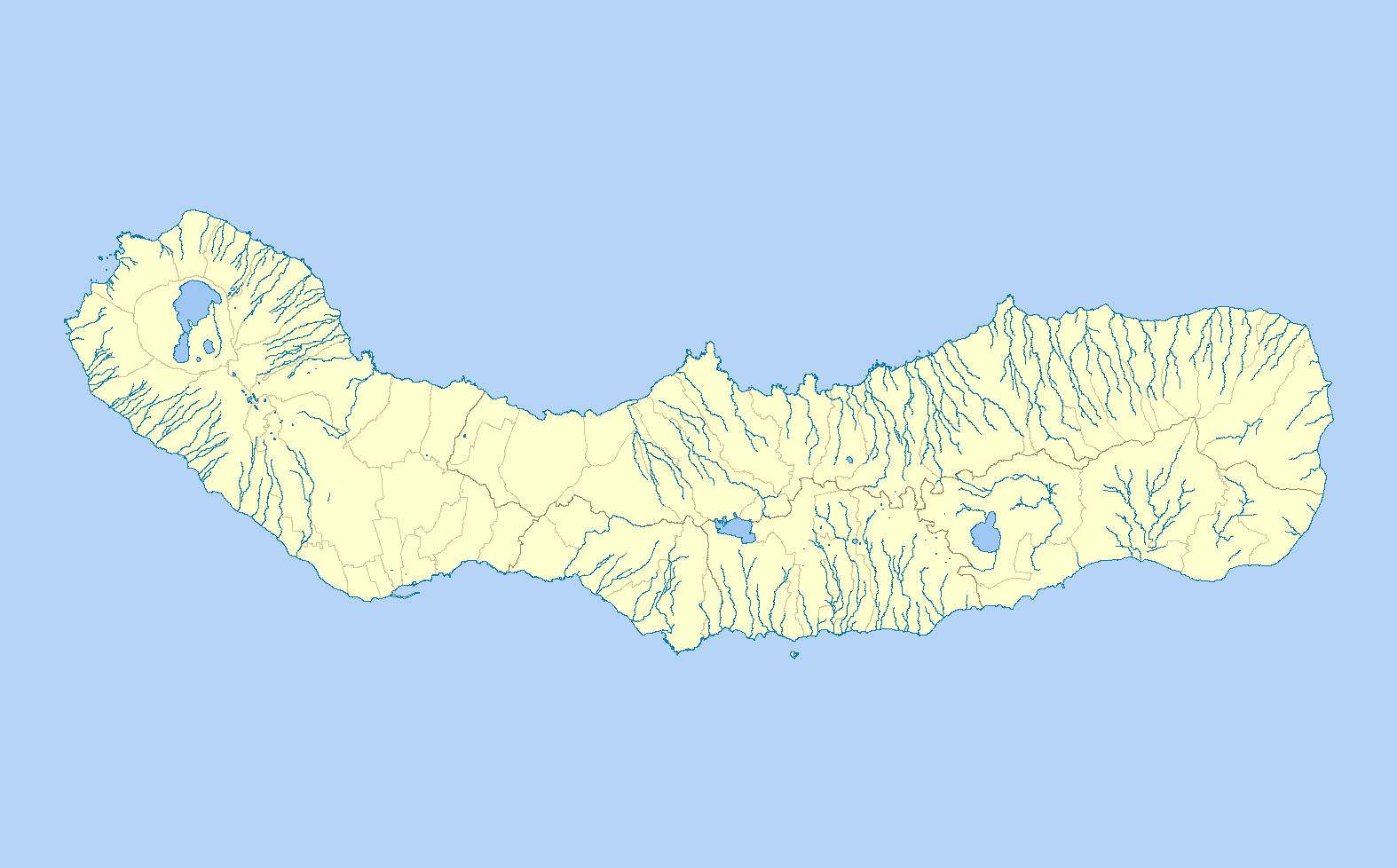
- Location in the Azores Santo António (São Miguel)
- Coordinates: 37°51′22″N 25°42′23″W
- Country: Portugal
- Auton. region: Azores
- Island: São Miguel
- Municipality: Ponta Delgada

Area
  - Total: 11.75 km^{2} (4.54 sq mi)
- Elevation: 135 m (443 ft)

Population (2011)
  - Total: 1,829
  - Density: 155.7/km^{2} (403.2/sq mi)
- Time zone: UTC−01:00 (AZOT)
  - Summer (DST): UTC+00:00 (AZOST)
- Area code: 292
- Patron: Santo António

Santo António (Portuguese for "Saint Anthony") is a parish in the district of Ponta Delgada in the Azores. The population in 2011 was 1,829, in an area of 11.75 km². It is located in the northwestern part of the island of São Miguel.
