= Ponta Delgada =

- Municipality
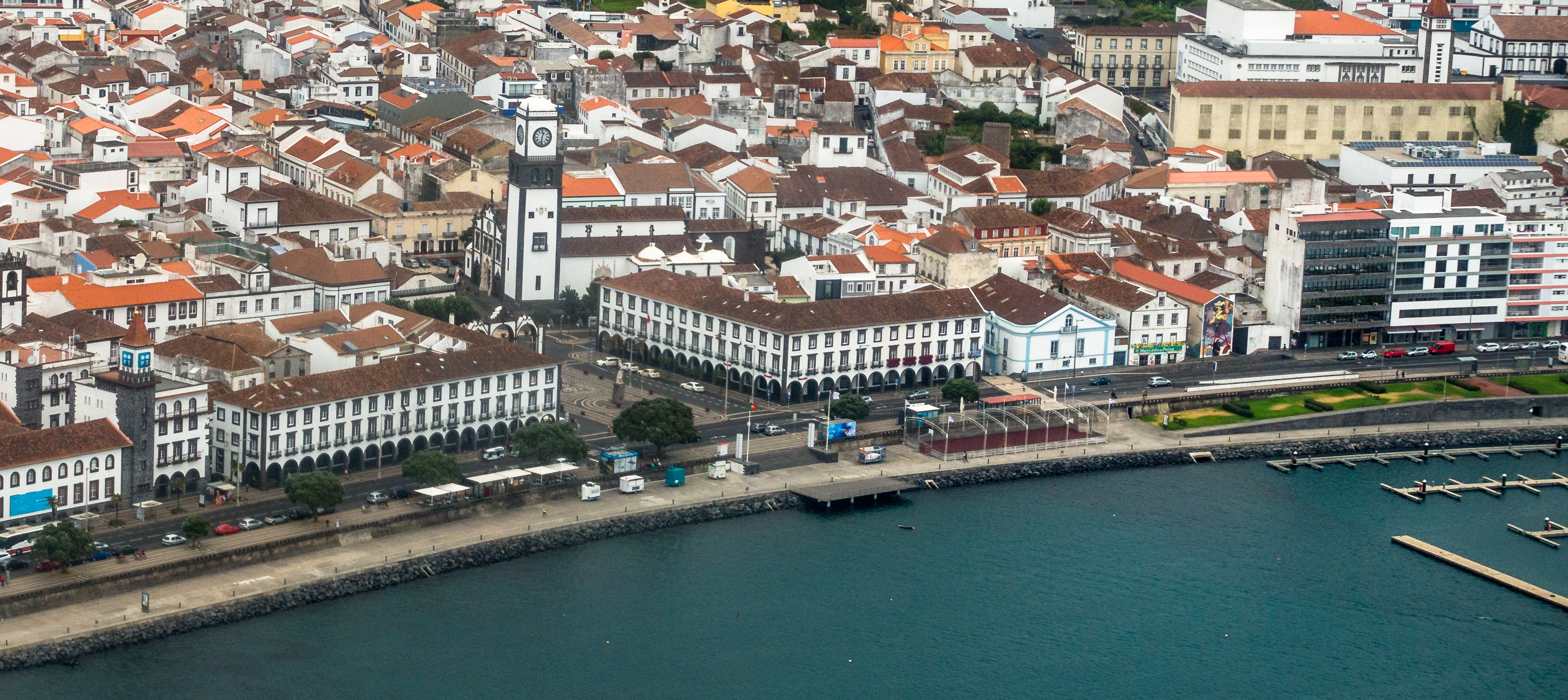
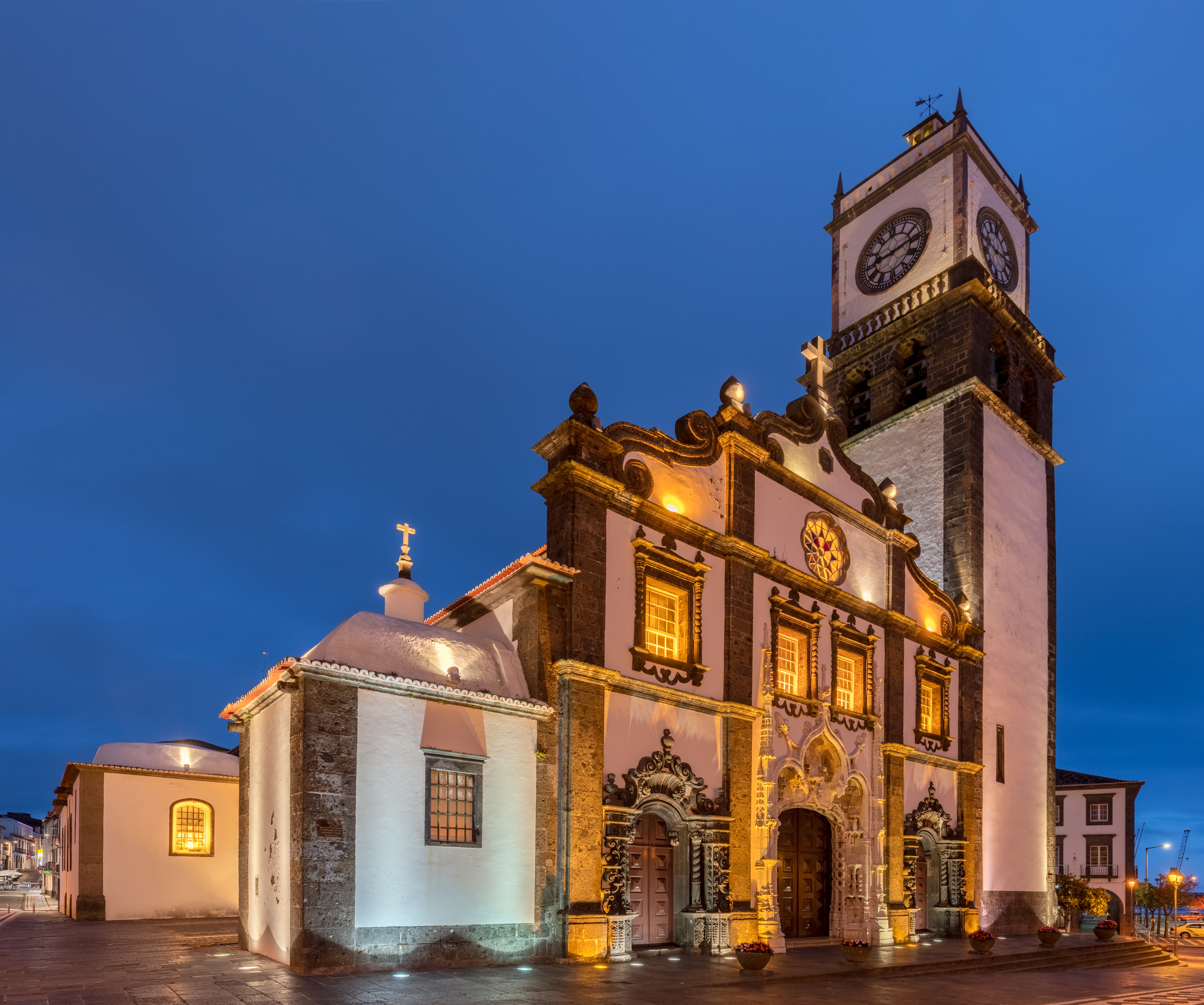
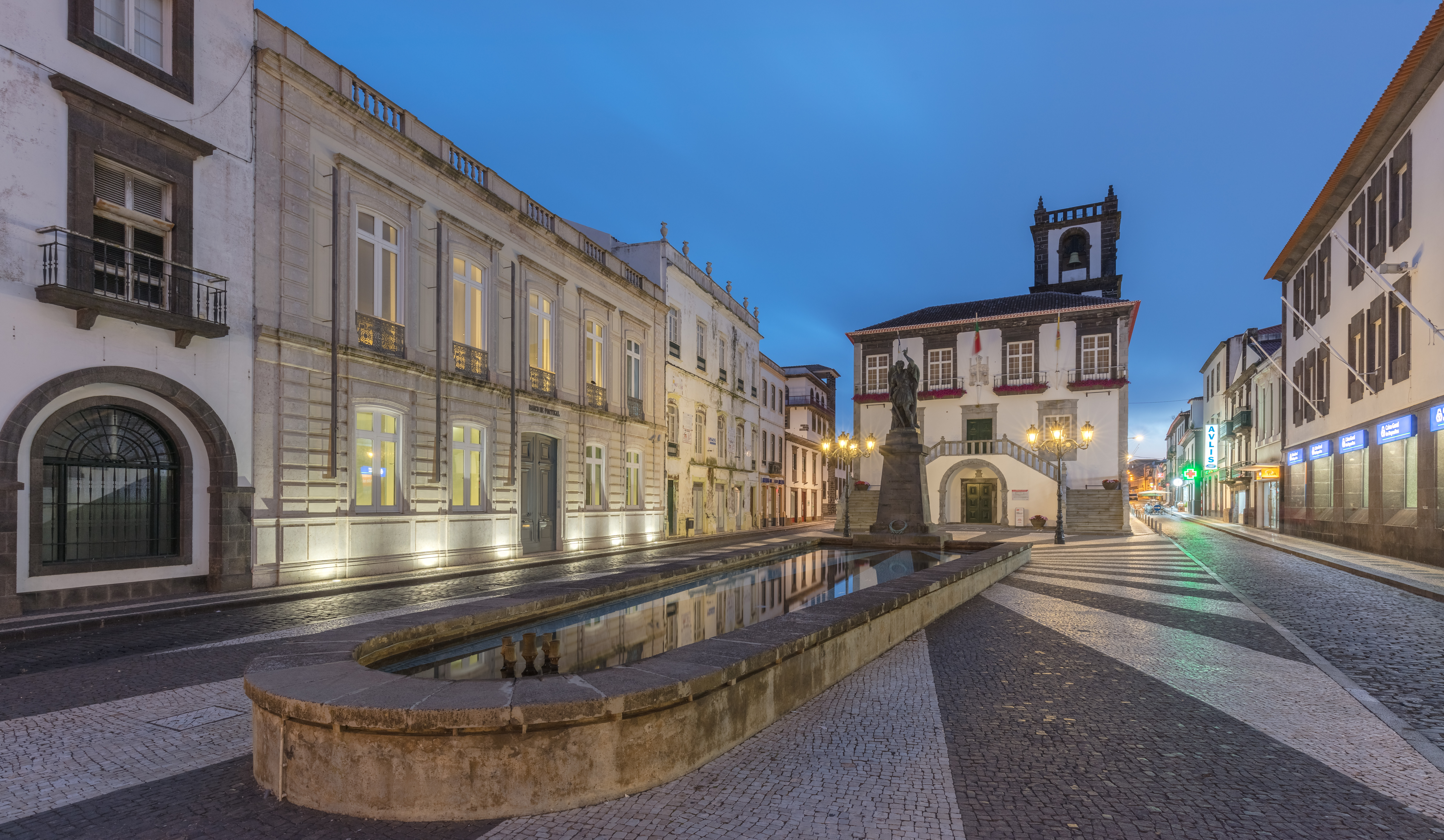
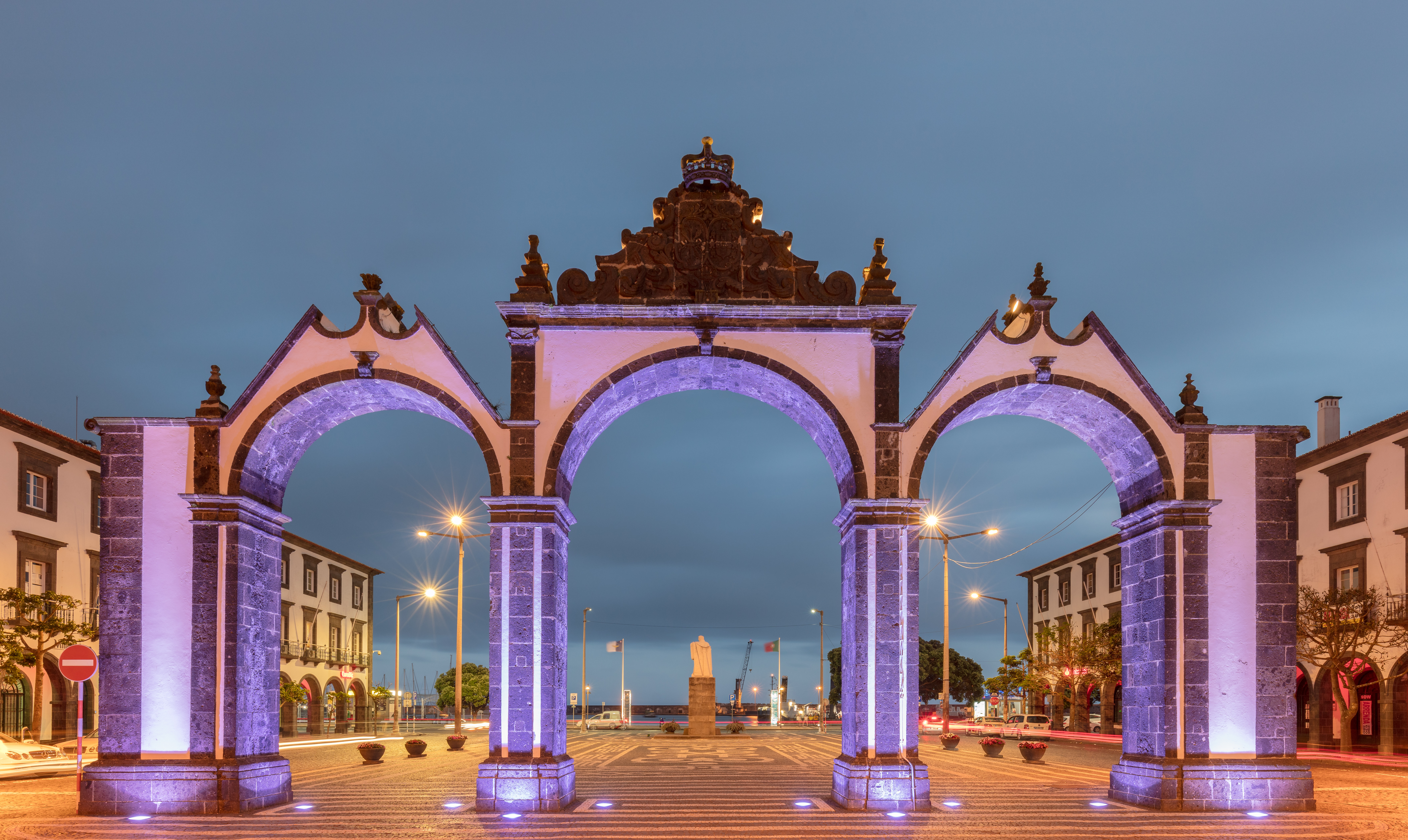
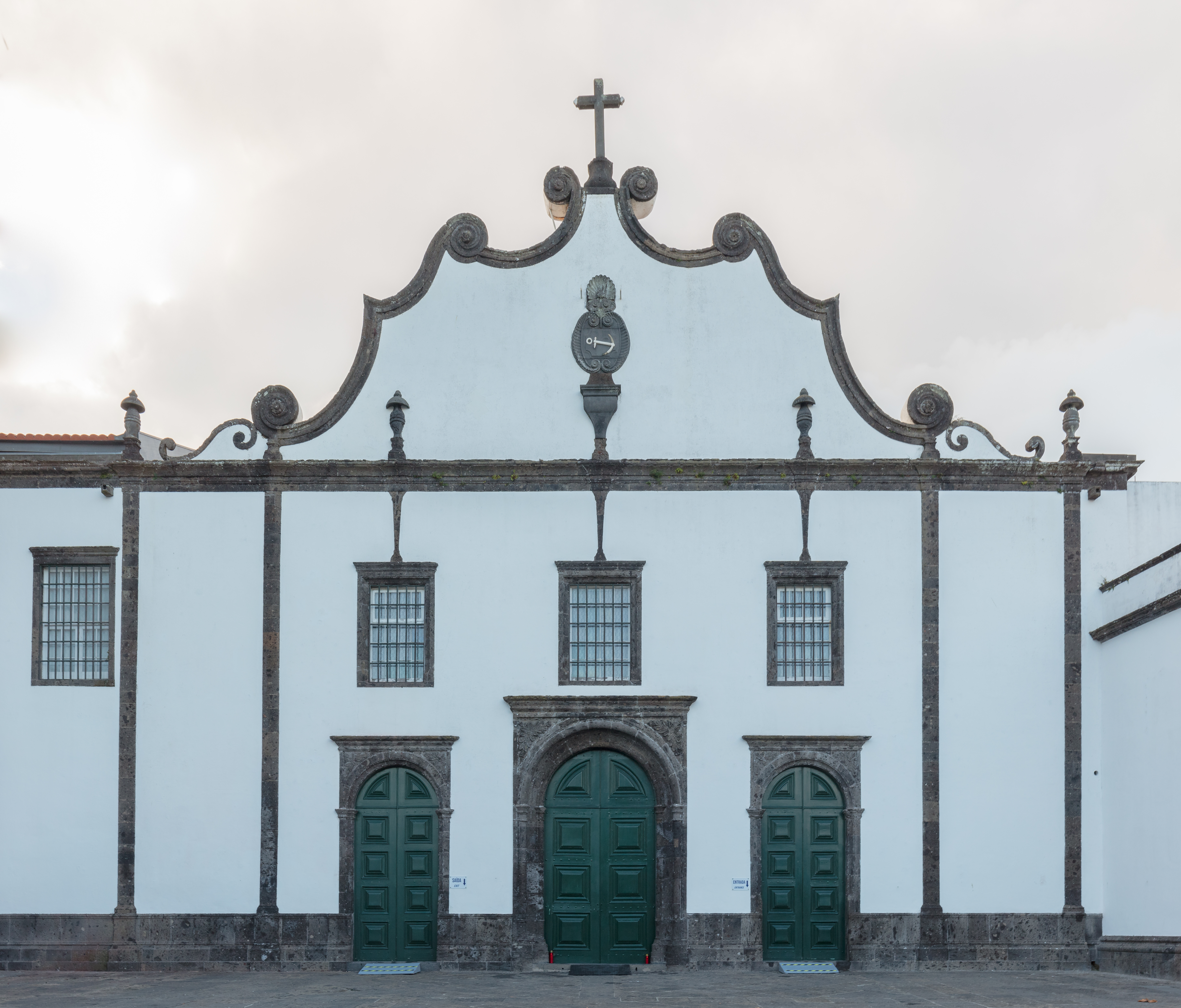
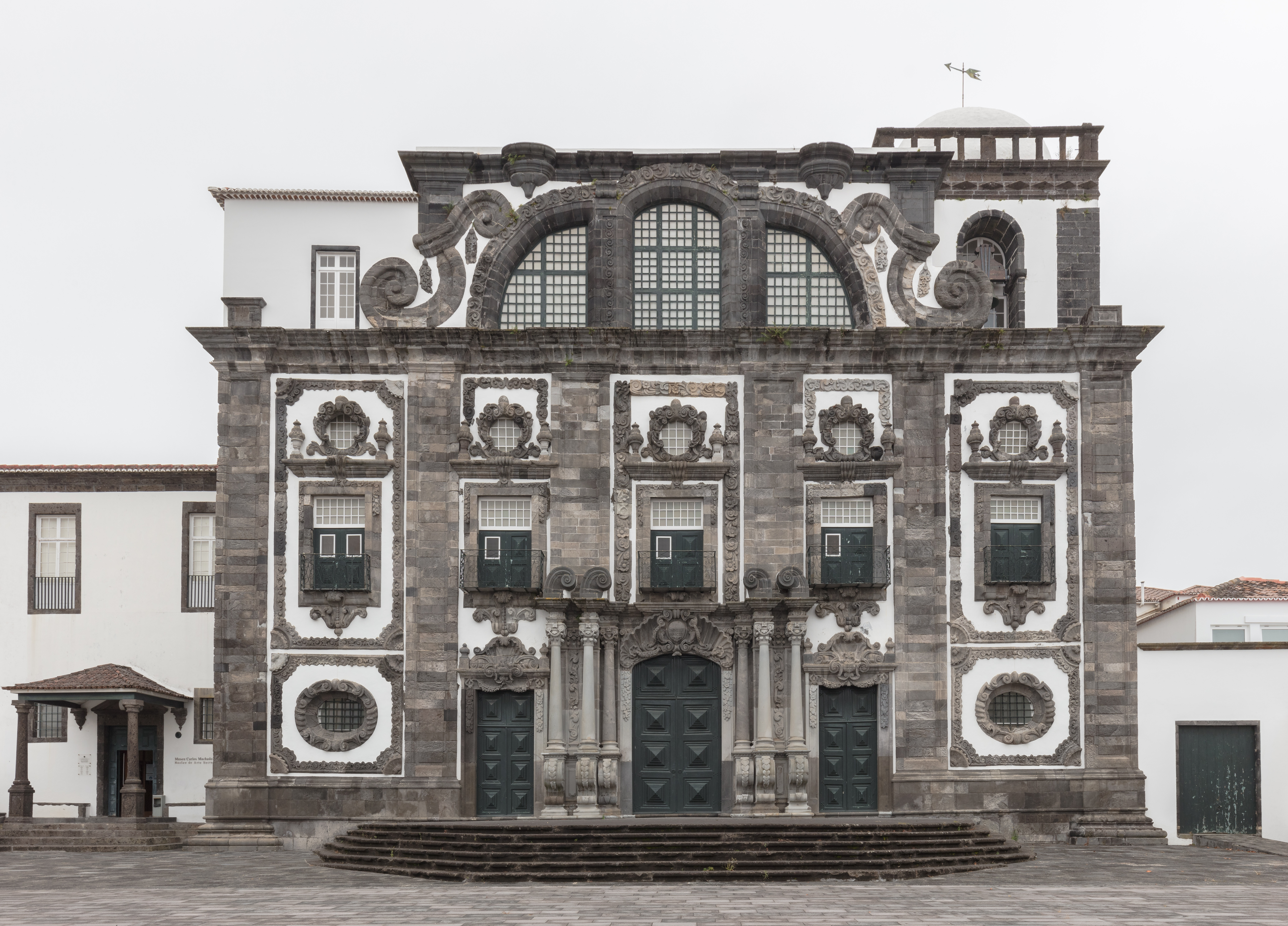
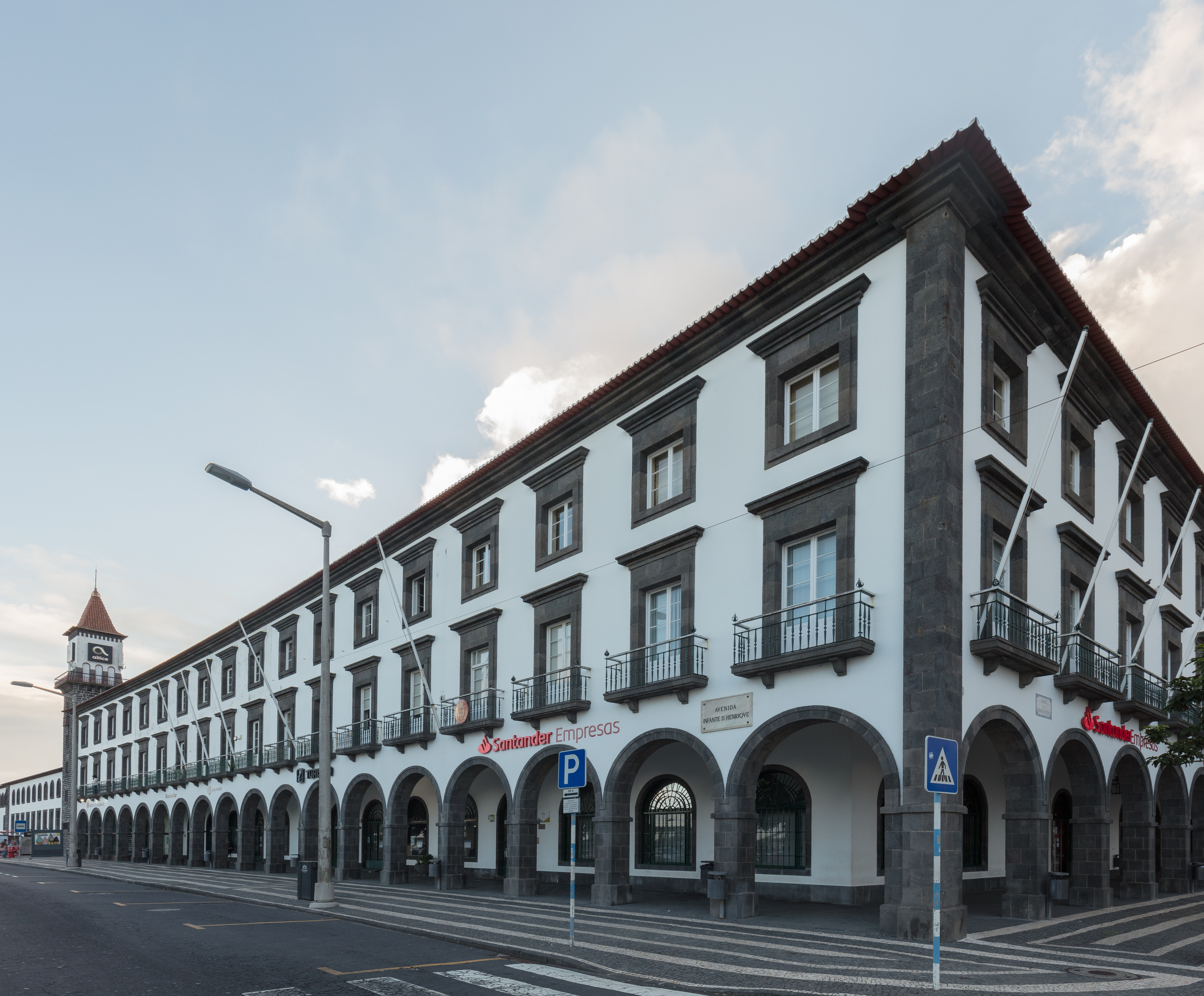
- Aerial view of Ponta Delgada Saint Sebastian Church City Hall City Gates Church of Our Lady of Hope Church of the Jesuit College Infante Dom Henrique Avenue

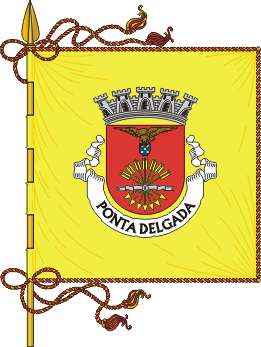
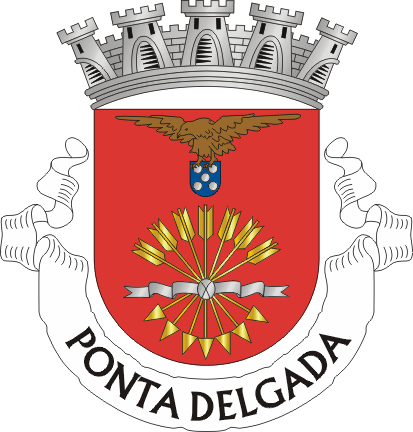
- Flag Coat of arms
- Interactive map of Ponta Delgada
- Coordinates: 37°44′28″N 25°40′50″W
- Country: Portugal
- Auton. region: Azores
- Island: São Miguel
- Established: Settlement: c. 1450; Municipality: 2 April 1546
- Parishes: 24

Government
  - President: Pedro Nascimento Cabral

Area
  - Total: 232.99 km^{2} (89.96 sq mi)
- Highest elevation: 761 m (2,497 ft)
- Lowest elevation: 0 m (0 ft)

Population (2021)
  - Total: 67,287 ▼
  - Density: 288.80/km^{2} (747.98/sq mi)
- Time zone: UTC−01:00 (AZOT)
  - Summer (DST): UTC+00:00 (AZOST)
- Postal code: 9504-523
- Area code: 296
- Patron: Senhor Santo Cristo dos Milagres
- Local holiday: Monday following the Sunday of festival of Senhor Santo Cristo

Ponta Delgada (European Portuguese pronunciation: [ˈpõtɐ ðɛlˈɣaðɐ]; lit. 'Thin Cape') is the largest municipality (concelho) and executive capital of the Autonomous Region of the Azores in Portugal. It is located on São Miguel Island, the largest and most populous in the archipelago. As of 2021, it has 67,287 inhabitants, in an area of 232.99 square kilometres (89.96 square miles). There are 17,629 residents in the three central civil parishes that comprise the historical city: São Pedro, São Sebastião, and São José. Ponta Delgada became the region's administrative capital under the revised constitution of 1976; the judiciary and Catholic See remained in the historical capital of Angra do Heroísmo while the Legislative Assembly of the Azores was established in Horta.

== History ==
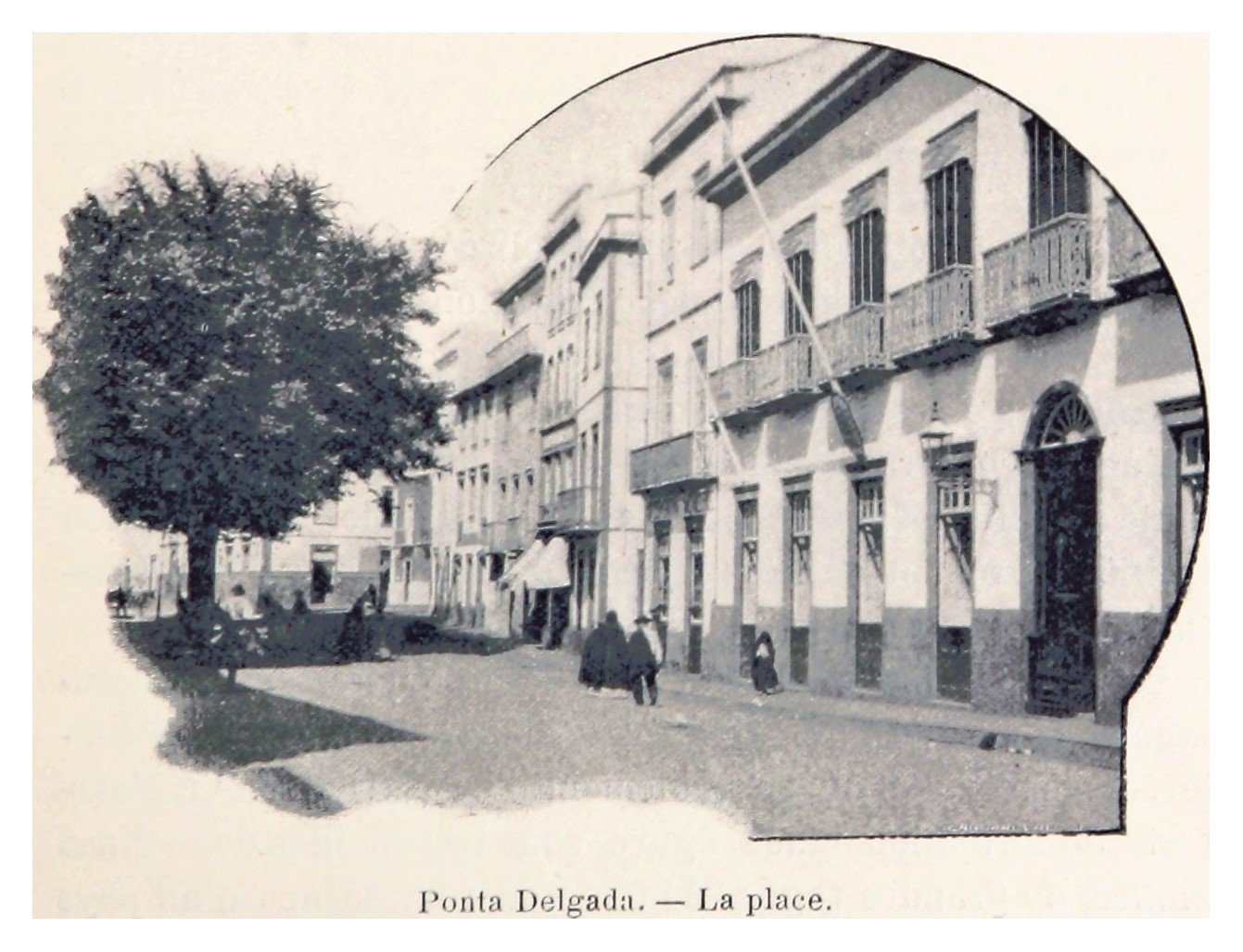
The main square in Ponta Delgada, around 1899.

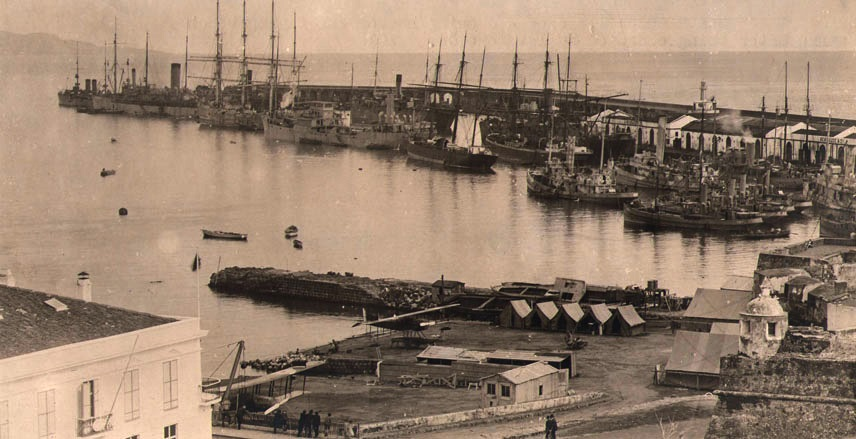
The wharf of Ponta Delgada as seen at the end of the First World War, highlighting the US 1st Aeronautical Company (1 January 1918)

The origin of the placename Ponta Delgada (Portuguese for delicate or thin point) was elaborated by the famous Portuguese chronicler, Father Gaspar Frutuoso, who wrote:

This city of Ponta Delgada is named for its situation located along volcanic lands, thin and not too considerable like on other islands, that lead to the sea, and where later, was constructed the chapel of Santa Clara (Saint Clare of Assisi), which was named the Santa Clara point …

In around 1450, Pêro de Teive established a small fishing village that eventually grew into the urban agglomeration in Santa Clara.

Populated since 1444, São Miguel was a relatively large island with small settlements scattered about, except for Vila Franca do Campo in the central-southern coast and the smaller community of Ponta Delgada. Villa Franca had for many years been the center of the island economically and socially and the seat of the local government, but many nobles and landed gentry despised its subordinate status to the government in that town (originating many conflicts between these inhabitants and administrators in the southern coast). The nobles in Ponta Delgada sent a secret contingent, headed by Fernão Jorge Velho, to meet with King Manuel in Lisbon to petition that the community be emancipated. In Abrantes, King Manuel conferred a foral on 29 May 1507, elevating the settlement to the status of the village (Portuguese: vila).

In 1522, an earthquake and landslide devastated the provincial capital, destroying many of the buildings and killing several people. Ponta Delgada became the only centre with an infrastructure to support the Azorean bureaucracy and supplant its important economic links. Quickly, its role changed, and eventually it was elevated to the status of city during the reign of King D. João III by decree, dated 2 April 1546.

The naval Battle of Ponta Delgada (also known as the Battle of São Miguel) took place on 26 July 1582, off the coast, as part of the 1580 Portuguese succession crisis. An Anglo-French corsair expedition sailed against Spain to preserve Portuguese control of the Azores, which had aligned itself with the pretender António, Prior of Crato, thereby preventing Spanish control (it was the largest French force sent overseas before the age of Louis XIV).

During the 19th century, the municipality experienced its greatest boost of economic activity, with the funneling of citrus exports to the United Kingdom and the growth of foreign-owned businesses in the historic center, many of them Jewish merchants after 1818. As with other centres across the archipelago, the town of Ponta Delgada experienced many of the trends common for the period, including the "greening" of the communities (with the construction of the gardens of António Borges, José do Canto, Jácome Correia and the Viscount of Porto Formoso, which would become part of the University of the Azores), the construction of many of the ornate homes/estates, the clearing of animals from urban spaces, the opening of newer, larger roadways, the moving of cemeteries to the periphery, and relocation of markets for fish, meat and fruits. Due to these changes, and growth of the mercantile class, Ponta Delgada became the third largest town in Portugal, in economic riches and the number of residents. The poet Bulhão Pato, writing of Ponta Delgada, was surprised by the extraordinary riches of the plantation owners, the "gentlemen farmers" that lived within the urbanized core: exporters of oranges and corn, bankers, investors, industrialists and shippers, all contributing to a privileged class of economic and social thinkers and philanthropists.

At the beginning of the 20th century, Ponta Delgada's position was relatively high (eighth largest), although the changing importance of rural economies steadily chipped away at its growth. But it remained the central place in the economy and hierarchy of the Azorean archipelago. Consequently, it was at the forefront of political change following the Carnation Revolution. In one such event, property owners and right-leaning farmers challenged the Civil Governor António Borges Coutinho, who was responsible, under the direction of the MFA government, to implement land reforms. The Micalense Farmers' Protest, forced his resignation, and inspired a series of terrorist acts that plunged the Azores into political turmoil. After a clandestine round-up of arrests and detentions by the Military Governor, the Autonomous District of Ponta Delgada was extinguished, along with the other districts (Horta and Angra do Heroísmo) on 22 August 1975, with the establishment of the Junta Regional dos Açores (Regional Junta of the Azores), the provisional government that assumed the competencies of the administration during the region's transition to constitutional autonomy.

== Geography ==
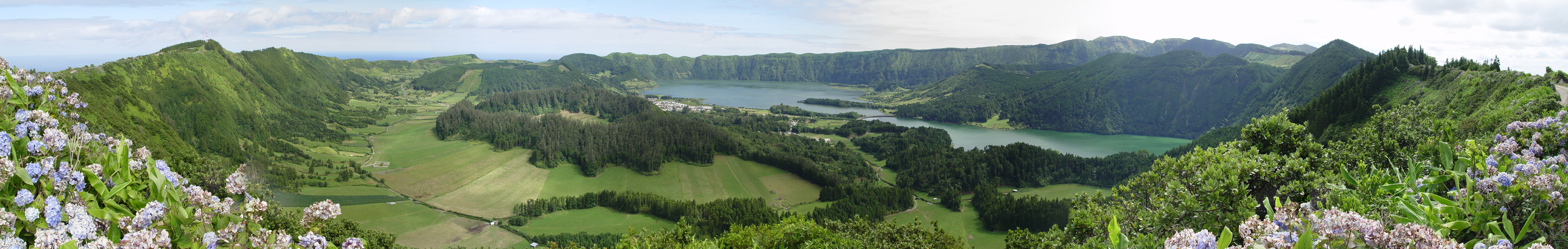
Panorama of the Sete Cidades Massif, showing the Green and Blue Lakes of the civil parish Sete Cidades

=== Physical geography ===
The municipality of Ponta Delgada is one of the larger administrative divisions in the archipelago, extending from the center of the island to the western coast. Ponta Delgada is bordered on the northeast by the municipality of Ribeira Grande, and southeast by relatively new municipality of Lagoa.

Geomorphologically, Ponta Delgada covers a volcanic area composed of two structures: the Picos Region and Sete Cidades Massif. The Picos Region extends from the shadow of the ancient volcano of the Água de Pau Massif (known locally for the lake that rests within its volcanic crater: Lagoa do Fogo) until the area around the Sete Cidades caldera. It is a volcanic axial zone oriented generally in a northwest–southeast direction, essentially defined by several spatter cones and lava flows and predominantly covered by dense vegetation and pasture lands. Its relief is relatively planar, especially along the northern and southern coasts, where many of the urban communities are located.

The Sete Cidades Massif, the other geomorphological structure that makes up the municipality of Ponta Delgada, consists of a central volcanic caldera and lake-filled cones which surround the crater. It occupies the extreme western part of the island, oriented along a similar northwest–southwest orientation, with many regional radial fractures marked by lava domes and spatter cones. The Sete Cidades Volcano at the center of the Massif consists of a caldera and a polygenetic volcanic field within it, that includes four lakes (two of which Lagoa Azul, the Blue Lake, and Lagoa Verde, the Green Lake, are linked). The caldera is almost circular and has evolved over the course of three phases. The first occurred 36,000 years ago forming the collapsed principal structure. The second phase conforms to a period approximately 29,000 years ago, when volcanic eruptions collapsed the northwest part of the structure. Finally, the third phase (about 16,000 years ago) caused the collapse of the north and northeastern portions of the caldera.

Geologically, within the last 5,000 years, the central cone has been active (17 eruptions) and responsible for causing most of the activity in the archipelago, during that period. These geological eruptions were essentially trachyte eruptions of the sub-Plinian or Plinian type, with hydro-magmatic characteristics. The last eruption, at about 500 years ago, gave rise to the Caldeira Seca cone. Although there has been no historical activity today, its active status continues to be debated by the scientific community. Most recently, its diverse geography includes various types of basaltic volcanism, both effusive and less explosive (essentially Strombolian and Hawaiian) along its flanks, usually conditioned by local and radial faults. The Mosteiros Graben is also an important feature in this area, representing collapse of lands on the northwestern flank of the caldera. Although there are no active aerial volcanic characteristics (like the fumaroles of Furnas), submarine vents around the region of Ponta da Ferraria and the beach at Mosteiros have been identified.

=== Climate ===
According to the Köppen climate classification, Ponta Delgada has a hot-summer Mediterranean climate (Köppen:Csa). It has warm dry summers, with moderate precipitation, and mild, wet winters.

Much like the rest of the Azores, the city is shaped by the Gulf Stream, and consequently has a narrow temperature variation. Mean temperatures vary between 14.5 °C (58.1 °F) in the winter to around 22 °C (72 °F) in the summer and daytime highs vary between 17 °C (63 °F) in the winter to 25 °C (77 °F) in the summer.

The average annual relative humidity is around 80%, which may influence the perceived temperature by a few degrees in the warmer months. Temperatures above 30 °C (86 °F), or below 4 °C (39 °F) have never been registered. The strong influence of the Atlantic Ocean produces significant seasonal lag. On average, the coolest month is February, while the warmest month is August, as well as September, October, November and December each having warmer weather compared to July, June, May and April respectively.

Its location is one of the limits for pressure measurement to verify the North Atlantic Oscillation (NAO).

Climate data for Afonso Chaves Observatory, Ponta Delgada 1991–2020 normals, 1981-2020 extremes, altitude: 35 m (115 ft)
Month	Jan	Feb	Mar	Apr	May	Jun	Jul	Aug	Sep	Oct	Nov	Dec	Year
Record high °C (°F)	21.2 (70.2)	21.0 (69.8)	23.1 (73.6)	23.5 (74.3)	25.2 (77.4)	28.3 (82.9)	29.3 (84.7)	30.1 (86.2)	29.5 (85.1)	26.7 (80.1)	26.5 (79.7)	22.4 (72.3)	30.1 (86.2)
Mean daily maximum °C (°F)	17.5 (63.5)	17.4 (63.3)	17.9 (64.2)	18.8 (65.8)	20.2 (68.4)	22.4 (72.3)	24.7 (76.5)	26.0 (78.8)	25.0 (77.0)	22.6 (72.7)	19.9 (67.8)	18.3 (64.9)	20.9 (69.6)
Daily mean °C (°F)	15.1 (59.2)	14.8 (58.6)	15.2 (59.4)	16.0 (60.8)	17.4 (63.3)	19.6 (67.3)	21.8 (71.2)	23.0 (73.4)	22.1 (71.8)	19.8 (67.6)	17.4 (63.3)	15.9 (60.6)	18.2 (64.8)
Mean daily minimum °C (°F)	12.7 (54.9)	12.1 (53.8)	12.6 (54.7)	13.3 (55.9)	14.6 (58.3)	16.8 (62.2)	18.9 (66.0)	19.9 (67.8)	19.1 (66.4)	17.1 (62.8)	14.9 (58.8)	13.4 (56.1)	15.5 (59.9)
Record low °C (°F)	5.0 (41.0)	5.2 (41.4)	5.4 (41.7)	6.9 (44.4)	7.9 (46.2)	9.2 (48.6)	11.5 (52.7)	12.0 (53.6)	12.0 (53.6)	10.1 (50.2)	7.1 (44.8)	6.2 (43.2)	5.0 (41.0)
Average precipitation mm (inches)	102.1 (4.02)	87.2 (3.43)	97.1 (3.82)	79.6 (3.13)	61.0 (2.40)	44.4 (1.75)	26.0 (1.02)	45.8 (1.80)	78.2 (3.08)	118.0 (4.65)	95.3 (3.75)	152.8 (6.02)	987.5 (38.88)
Average precipitation days (≥ 1 mm)	13.0	10.8	11.7	10.2	8.7	6.6	4.8	6.5	9.4	13.7	11.8	15.0	122.3
Average relative humidity (%)	82	82	81	79	80	80	78	79	80	80	82	83	81
Mean monthly sunshine hours	97	103	120	141	174	163	208	213	175	142	109	93	1,738
Source 1: Instituto Português do Mar e da Atmosfera
Source 2: NOAA (Humidity & Sunshine 1961-1990)

Climate data for Ponta Delgada, João Paulo II Airport 1981–2010 normals, 1981-2020 extremes, altitude: 75 m (246 ft)
Month	Jan	Feb	Mar	Apr	May	Jun	Jul	Aug	Sep	Oct	Nov	Dec	Year
Record high °C (°F)	19.8 (67.6)	20.4 (68.7)	21.9 (71.4)	22.6 (72.7)	23.6 (74.5)	27.0 (80.6)	28.2 (82.8)	28.8 (83.8)	28.6 (83.5)	25.8 (78.4)	25.5 (77.9)	22.6 (72.7)	28.8 (83.8)
Mean daily maximum °C (°F)	16.8 (62.2)	16.6 (61.9)	17.0 (62.6)	17.7 (63.9)	19.1 (66.4)	21.4 (70.5)	23.9 (75.0)	25.3 (77.5)	24.3 (75.7)	21.9 (71.4)	19.4 (66.9)	17.8 (64.0)	20.1 (68.2)
Daily mean °C (°F)	14.5 (58.1)	14.1 (57.4)	14.5 (58.1)	15.1 (59.2)	16.4 (61.5)	18.6 (65.5)	20.9 (69.6)	22.1 (71.8)	21.4 (70.5)	19.2 (66.6)	16.9 (62.4)	15.4 (59.7)	17.4 (63.4)
Mean daily minimum °C (°F)	12.2 (54.0)	11.5 (52.7)	12.0 (53.6)	12.3 (54.1)	13.6 (56.5)	15.8 (60.4)	17.8 (64.0)	19.0 (66.2)	18.4 (65.1)	16.5 (61.7)	14.3 (57.7)	12.9 (55.2)	14.7 (58.4)
Record low °C (°F)	4.6 (40.3)	5.1 (41.2)	5.0 (41.0)	5.9 (42.6)	7.8 (46.0)	8.5 (47.3)	12.1 (53.8)	13.5 (56.3)	8.3 (46.9)	11.0 (51.8)	7.6 (45.7)	6.2 (43.2)	4.6 (40.3)
Average precipitation mm (inches)	96.9 (3.81)	84.0 (3.31)	87.7 (3.45)	76.7 (3.02)	72.0 (2.83)	39.6 (1.56)	26.6 (1.05)	46.1 (1.81)	91.9 (3.62)	108.5 (4.27)	108.7 (4.28)	146.9 (5.78)	985.6 (38.80)
Average precipitation days (≥ 0.1 mm)	19.7	18.4	19.5	17.5	12.2	9.3	8.9	8.1	12.5	16.5	17.9	17.7	178.2
Source 1: Instituto Português do Mar e da Atmosfera
Source 2: Météo Climat (extremes)

=== Human geography ===
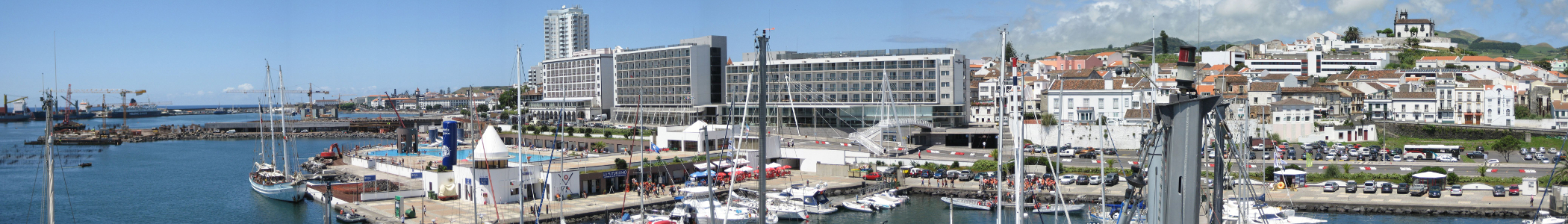
Panorama of the Marina Pêro de Teive, a yachting centre and tourist area near the port of Ponta Delgada (the Marine Atlantic Hotel in the background)

Population of the Municipality of Ponta Delgada (1849–2011)
Year	Pop.	±%
1849	31,344	—
1900	52,120	+66.3%
1930	54,790	+5.1%
1960	74,306	+35.6%
1981	63,804	−14.1%
1991	61,989	−2.8%
2001	65,854	+6.2%
2011	68,809	+4.5%
2021	67,287	−2.2%

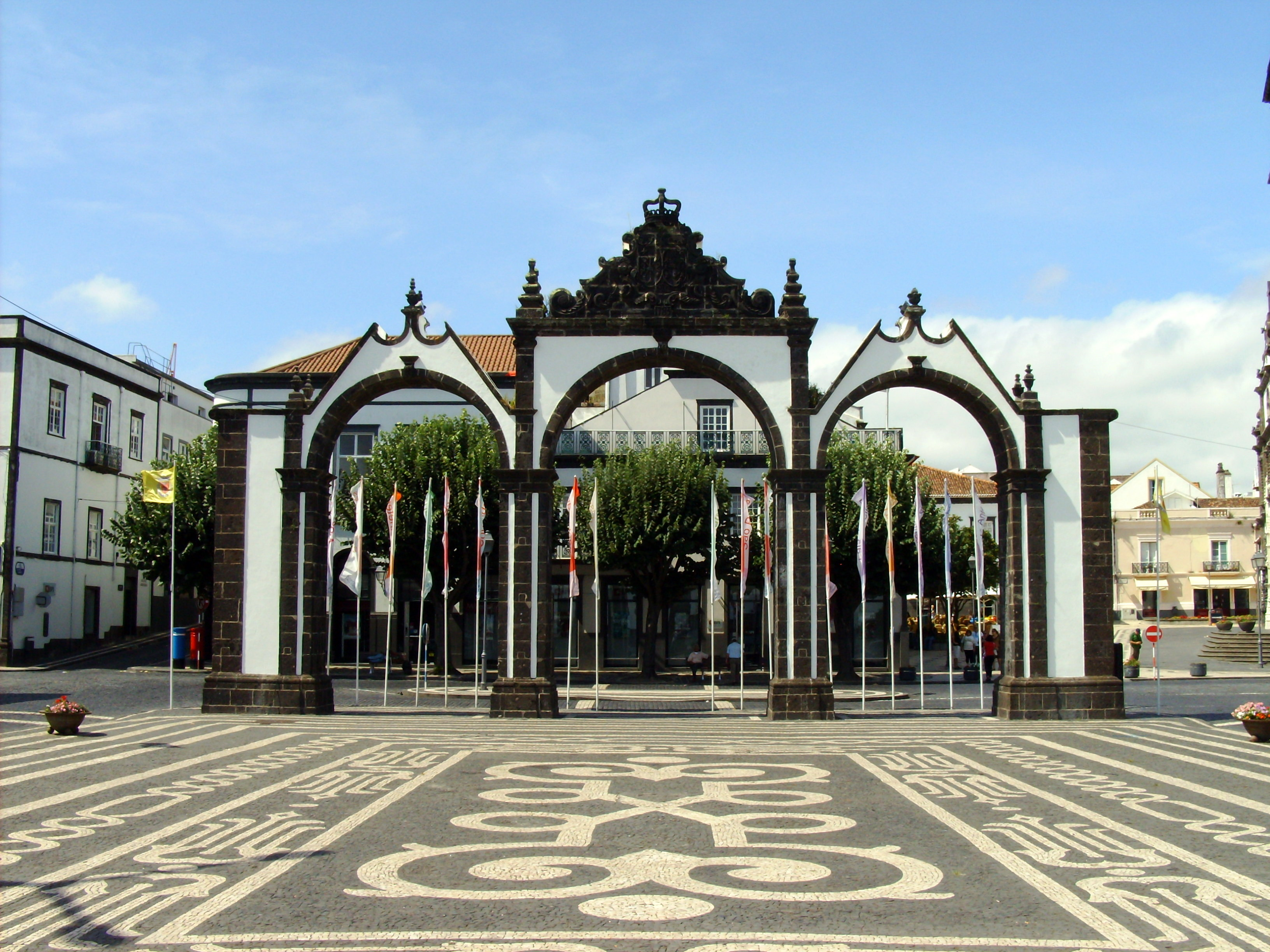
The Portas da Cidade (Gates to the City), the historical entrance to the village of Ponta Delgada

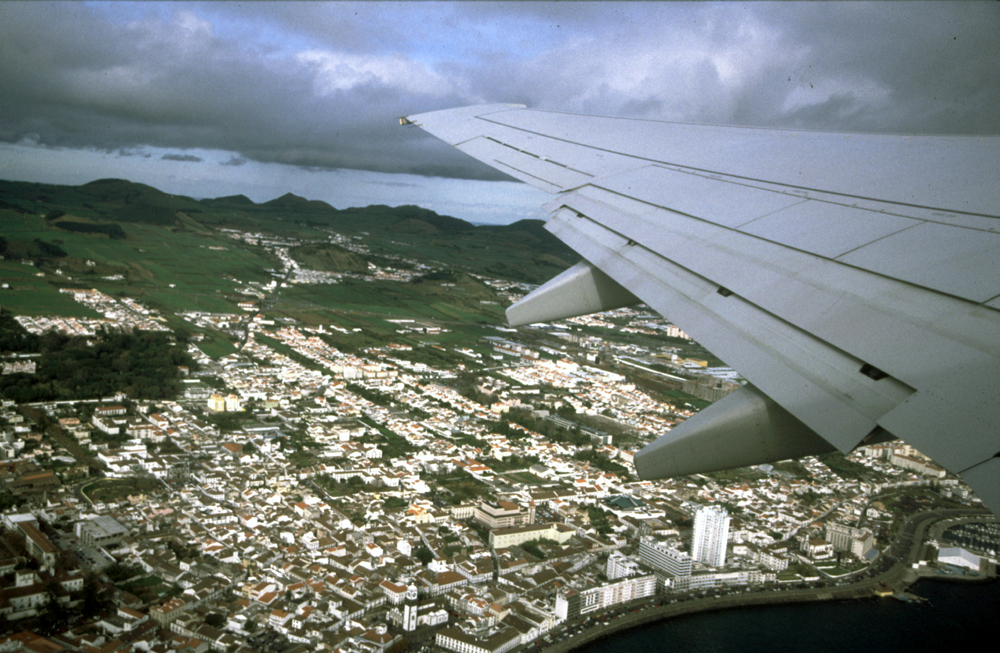
A view of the commercial-industrial centre of Ponta Delgada from a B737 departing John Paul II International Airport

Much like other communities in the archipelago of the Azores, the municipality is shaped by its geography; most homes are clustered along the regional road network that circles the island, with many ancillary or agricultural access roads bisecting the central portion of the island (primarily in the Picos Region) along a north–south axis.

Administratively, the municipality is composed of 24 parishes, that handle development, in the defense of local social, cultural, recreation and environmental concerns:

- Ajuda da Bretanha: new rural community, broken-off in 2002 from the parish of Bretanha, with a population of less than 1500 inhabitants;
- Arrifes: the largest milk-producing region of the Azores, Arrifes' population in 2001 was less than 7000 inhabitants, concentrated in three areas: Milagres, Piedade, and Saude;
- Candelária: 1184 residents lived in this community in 2001, an agricultural zone that is also highly forested;
- Capelas: often assumed to be the location of many religious sanctuaries, this agricultural community (3,759 inhabitants in 2001) was named for the volcanic structures that populated the coastal areas;
- Covoada: de-annexed from Relva in 1980, it is an agricultural community populated by small lakes, with 1259 inhabitants;
- Fajã de Baixo: one of the peripheral suburbs of the city of Ponta Delgada, it is highly concentrated, dense parish with 1,124.2 inhabitants/km^{2};
- Fajã de Cima: the northern limits of the city of Ponta Delgada, with a large residential population of 3634 inhabitants (2001);
- Fenais da Luz: the community is primarily located along a plain of productive farmland, its population less than 2000 residents (2001);
- Feteiras: a southern coastal community primarily concentrated on farming, with a population of 1709 inhabitants (2001);
- Ginetes: an agricultural and fishing community in the western part of the municipality, there were 1267 residents living in this parish in 2001;
- Livramento: also referred to as Rosto do Cão, it is a continuation of the urbanized area of Ponta Delgada, and home to less than 3500 residents;
- Mosteiros: known for the islets, and hydrothermal vents off-shore, this is the westernmost parish of 1196 inhabitants;
- Pilar da Bretanha: de-annexed in 2002 from the parish of Bretanha, this parish includes 750 residents dispersed in the foothills of the Sete Cidades Massif;
- Relva: known as the location of the international airport, Relva is an important suburb and industrial center, with 2703 residents in 2001;
- Remédios: nestled between Bretanha and Santa Bárbara, along the northern coast, it is an area of dairy farming, with 997 inhabitants;
- Santa Bárbara: a parish with less than 100 inhabitants, between Santo António and Remedios, concentrated on agriculture;
- Santa Clara: an industrial center in the city of Ponta Delgada, known for its football club, C.D. Santa Clara, as the center of the commercial fishery and manufacturing, as well as the island's fuel deposit;
- Santo António: another agricultural community along the northern coast, whose population in 2001 was more than 2000 inhabitants;
- São José (Ponta Delgada): one of the traditional centers of the urbanized core of Ponta Delgada, that includes many of the historical buildings, including Campo de São Francisco, Church of São José and the sanctuary of the Convent of Esperança (location of the devotional image of Senhor Santo Cristo dos Milagres, used in annual celebrations around Easter);
- São Pedro (Ponta Delgada): a central parish in the city of Ponta Delgada, home to the University of the Azores, the Marina, hotels and commercial businesses, and many blocks of apartments along Avenida D. João III and Avenida Natalia Correia;
- São Roque: also part of the Rosto do Cão area, it encompasses Ponta Delgada's primary beaches (Praia das Malícias and Praia do Pópulo), seaside avenues, as well as the city's municipal stadium and industrial park (Azores Parque);
- São Sebastião (Ponta Delgada): the central baixa of the city, includes all the historical buildings, traditional commercial business, and tourist attractions, including the Municipal buildings, Portas da Cidade, Matriz Church, Hospital do Divino Espirito Santo and Courts;
- São Vicente Ferreira: consists of primarily agricultural tracts along the northern coast and population of 1664 inhabitants (2001);
- Sete Cidades: located within the crater of the Sete Cidades Massif, the parish is bordered by twin lakes, and considered an ex-libris of the island of São Miguel.

Along the southern coast is the urbanized core of the historic village/town of Ponta Delgada, which includes the principal civic infrastructures, high-capacity motorways (Portuguese: Vias-rápidas), tourist and culture attractions, as well as the businesses and government services. This city of Ponta Delgada includes specifically the civil parishes of Santa Clara, São José, São Sebastião and São Pedro, which is divided by the motorways with the urbanized contour of Fajã de Cima and Fajã de Baixo. Not to be confused with a traditional city, the city of Ponta Delgada has no legal jurisdiction or mayor, but the municipality of Ponta Delgada has an elected official, the Presidente da Câmara Municipal who administers and Assembleia Municipal, which is the representative council, while dispersed parish councils (and elected presidents) govern the localities that circle the western edge of São Miguel.

The urban core includes the baixa or lower town, referring to the historic centre of buildings, shops and landmarks that gathered over the centuries around the square of São Sebastião and Praça Gonçalo Velho (dedicated to the island's discoverer). Immediately around this urban core are the municipal hall, the gates to the city (Portuguese: Portas da Cidade) and old customhouse buildings in front of the main roadway that follows the coast (itself passing the Fort of São Brás and Campo do São Francisco in the west). Other important landmarks include the Portas do Mar (Gates of the Sea), main tower of the SolMar Avenida Center mall and Theatre Micalense.

== Crime ==
Ponta Delgada and the broader Azores have experienced a significant deterioration in public safety since 2020, marking a dramatic shift from their historical status as Portugal's safest region. The municipality recorded 3,188 criminal cases in 2023, representing 32.6% of all crime across the Azores archipelago.

=== Current trends ===
The Azores region posted a crime rate of 40.6 per thousand inhabitants in 2023, significantly above Portugal's national average of 35.0. This represents a reversal for islands that maintained some of Europe's lowest crime rates throughout the 2000s and 2010s.

Violent crime reached 255 incidents across the Azores in 2023, marking a 23% increase from the previous year. The most common crimes include domestic violence (821 cases), vehicle theft (517 cases), and drug trafficking (257 cases).

Residents report visible deterioration in daily life quality, with open drug use becoming commonplace on Ponta Delgada streets and repeated incidents of property crime. Visible homelessness has increased dramatically, with reports of aggressive harassment from individuals seeking money.

=== Drug trafficking ===
The Azores have emerged as a critical hub in transatlantic cocaine trafficking operations. Criminal organizations from Ukraine and South America have established the islands as "technical support bases" for maritime drug smuggling between South America and Europe.

Major drug seizures have included over 840 kilograms (1,850 lb) of cocaine and operations valued at €300 million, with criminal networks operating sophisticated yacht and sailboat routes that exploit the Azores' strategic position and extensive coastlines.

=== Economic and social factors ===
The Azores face Portugal's highest poverty risk at 31.4%, with severe material and social deprivation affecting 12% of residents—double the national average. The unemployment rate of 6.5% combines with the country's lowest employability rate at 73.5%, creating conditions that research identifies as predictive of increased crime rates.

A significant factor involves individuals deported from the United States and Canada for criminal offenses who return to the Azores with limited economic opportunities and, in some cases, established criminal network connections. This population often lacks local employment opportunities and social support systems, contributing to recidivism and the importation of North American criminal methodologies.

=== Law enforcement challenges ===
Residents report a virtual absence of foot patrols in Ponta Delgada, with police presence limited to occasional patrol car passes that rarely result in proactive engagement with street-level problems. The lack of community policing has created an environment where open drug use, aggressive panhandling, and petty crime operate with apparent impunity.

The islands' geography creates unique law enforcement challenges, with limited forensic and investigative resources covering extensive coastlines across multiple islands. The dependency on mainland Portugal for specialized criminal investigations creates delays that allow criminal networks to establish deeper local roots.

== Twin towns—Sister cities ==
Ponta Delgada is twinned with:

- San Leandro, California, United States, since 1970
- Fall River, Massachusetts, United States, since 1978
- Caué/Angolares, São Tomé and Príncipe, since 2000
- Newport, Rhode Island, United States, since 2003
- Pleven, Bulgaria, since 2007
- Praia, Cape Verde, since 2008
- Florianópolis, Brazil

== Economy ==
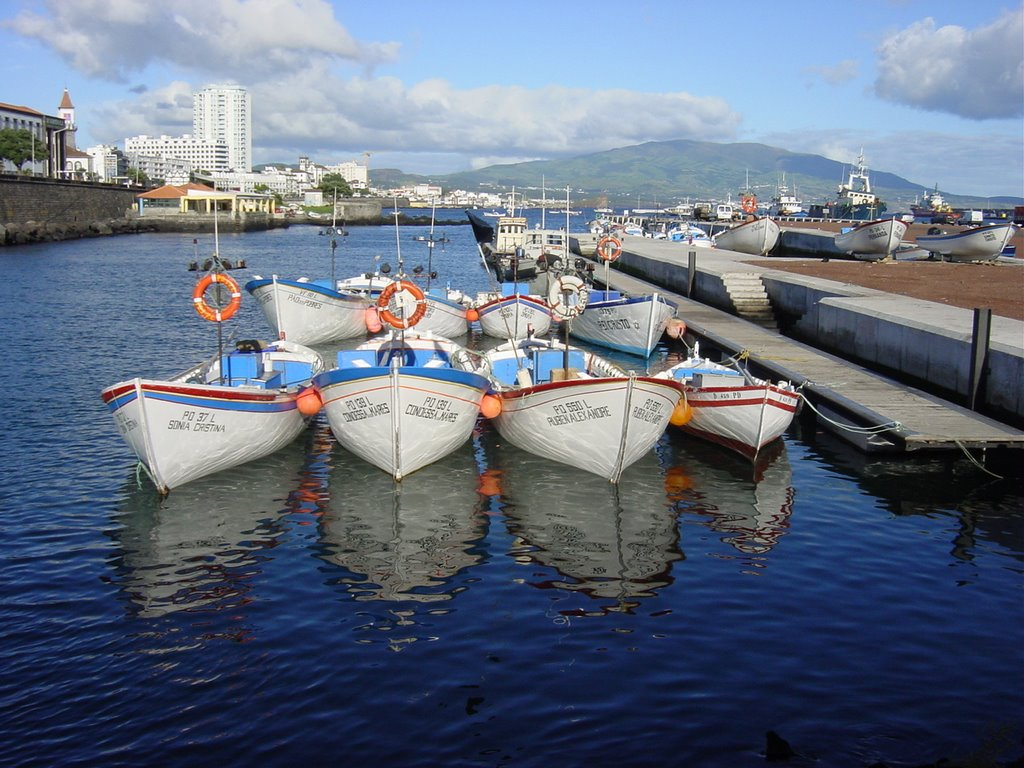
Part of the fisherman's wharf of the Port of Ponta Delgada: a centre of fish catchers in southern São Miguel

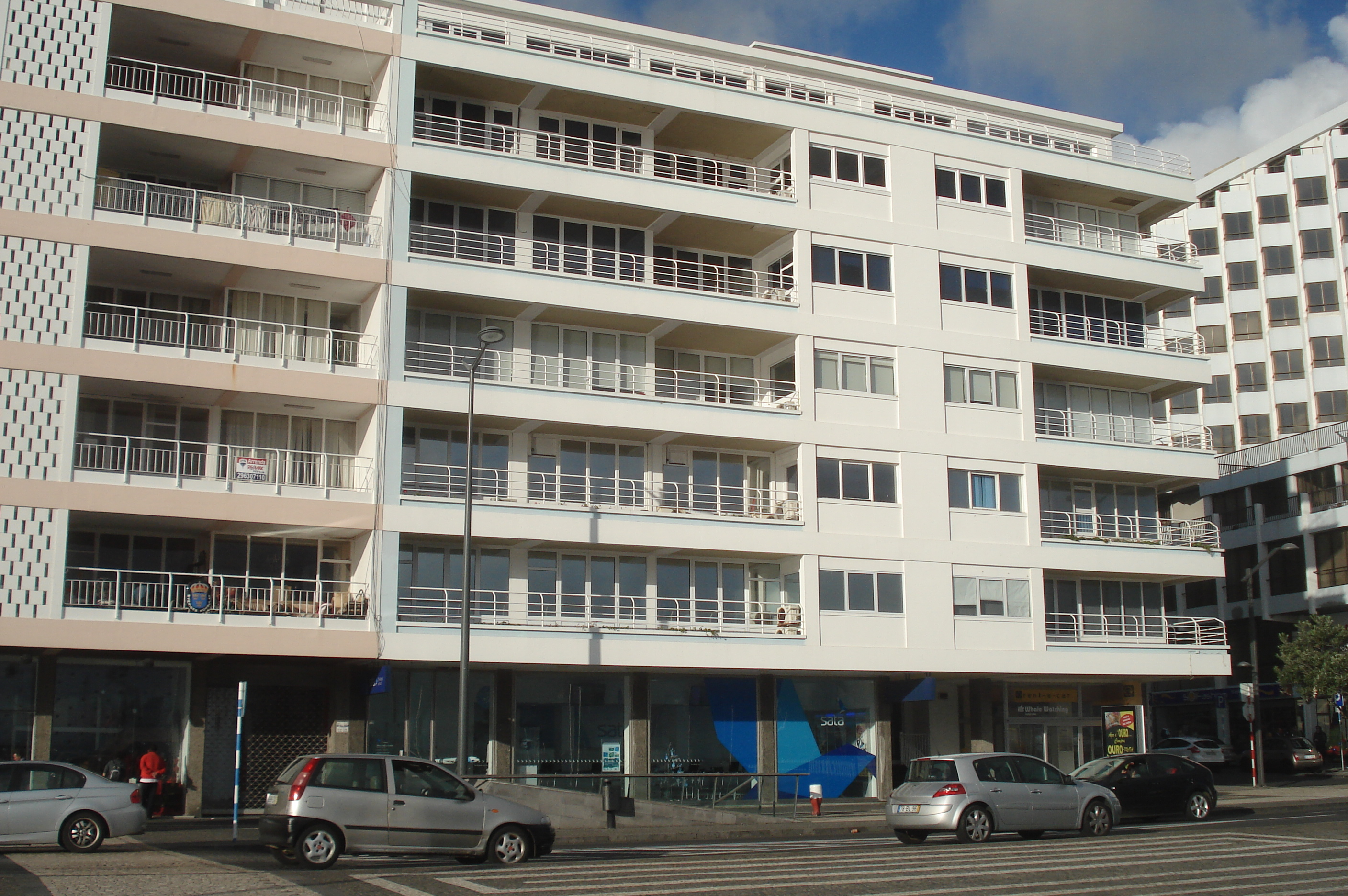
SATA Air Açores headquarters

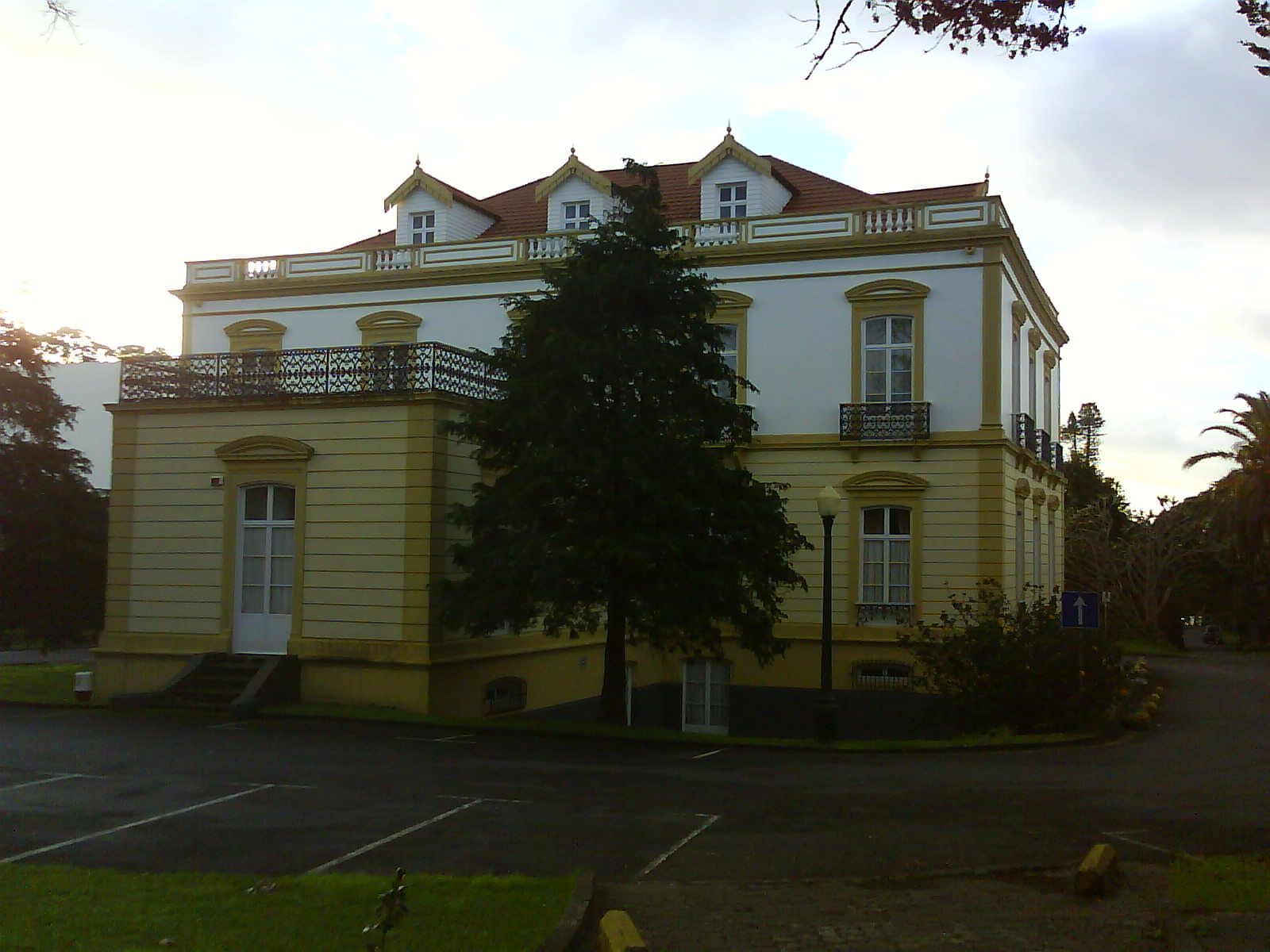
The rectorate building of the University of the Azores

With a strong concentration of service activities, the municipality is an important industrial and agricultural centre. The Arrifes-Covoada basin is the main bread-basket on the island of São Miguel, in addition to all the parishes located around the rim of the Sete Cidades Massif.

In 1999, 1039 companies had their operational seats within the borders of Ponta Delgada, roughly equal to 45.4% of the companies of the Azores. Of these companies, 4.4% were in the primary sector, 13.7% in secondary industries and 81.9% in the tertiary service sector. The volume of sales (in 2000) was equivalent to 1,458 million Euros, associated with the service industry, of which banking, computer programming/services, corporate and commercial services, as well as tourism, dominate.

Tourist activity in Ponta Delgada accounted for 34% of the hotel occupancy in the region, of which 46% were overnight trips (1997).

Ponta Delgada has seen an increase in tourism since the Azores gained attention through many different travel media mediums, such as the World Travel Market London’s annual survey recognized the Azores as the world’s most underrated destination. Also, in recent years, Forbes, Bloomberg, BBC, Lonely Planet, Travel + Leisure, and other major global publications mentioned the Azores in their ‘must-visit’ lists for sustainable and adventure travel. The Azores and Ponta Delgada were one of the poorest areas in Europe, until they saw potential in the tourism industry. Now, flights have increased over 200% from North America, with the Ponta Delgada airport being the main hub for the islands. Also, a study in 2014 found that Ponta Delgada accounted for 41.5% of the accommodation capacity of the Azores, and the overnight stays in hotel establishments represented 55.5% of the Azores.

In addition, Ponta Delgada is the centre of administrative services in the region, with many of the governmental secretariats located in this municipal seat (including the Regional Presidency and several directorates).

Several newspapers are published in Ponta Delgada, including Açoriano Oriental (one of the oldest continuing daily newspapers in the country) and the Diário dos Açores.

== Transport ==
Served by an international airport in the parish of Relva (Ponta Delgada-João Paulo II International Airport), the municipality is the principal port of entry for goods entering and people arriving in the Azores. SATA International and SATA Air Açores have their head offices in Ponta Delgada. As of 2024, the airport served nearly 3,3 million passengers.

Near the harbour of Ponta Delgada a broad gauge railway was used several times to build and enlarge the harbour. The track used a seven-foot gauge, but it is unclear if this was Isambard Kingdom Brunel's 7 ft (2,134 mm) Brunel gauge.

Three bus routes operate in the city on weekdays from 07:00 to 19:00. Line A runs in the western part of town, line B in the central/north, and line C in the east. There are bus services between Ponta Delgada and most other towns on the island, but usually only a few times a day. City services and island-wide services are both accessible along "Avenida D. Infante Henriques" and conveniently accessible from major sites in Ponta Delgada. Distances on the island are short with journeys rarely longer than 90 minutes.

== Education ==
Ponta Delgada is home to the central nucleus of the University of the Azores, a multi-disciplinary institution that ranges from courses in tourism, computer engineering, social sciences and business management. From its principal campus in São Pedro, the rectorate manages three poles spread throughout the Azores, including Horta (with courses in Marine Biology, affiliated with the Department of Oceanography and Fishing) and Angra do Heroísmo (with a broad course calendar of courses in teaching, business and agricultural sciences).

== Culture ==
=== Religious ===
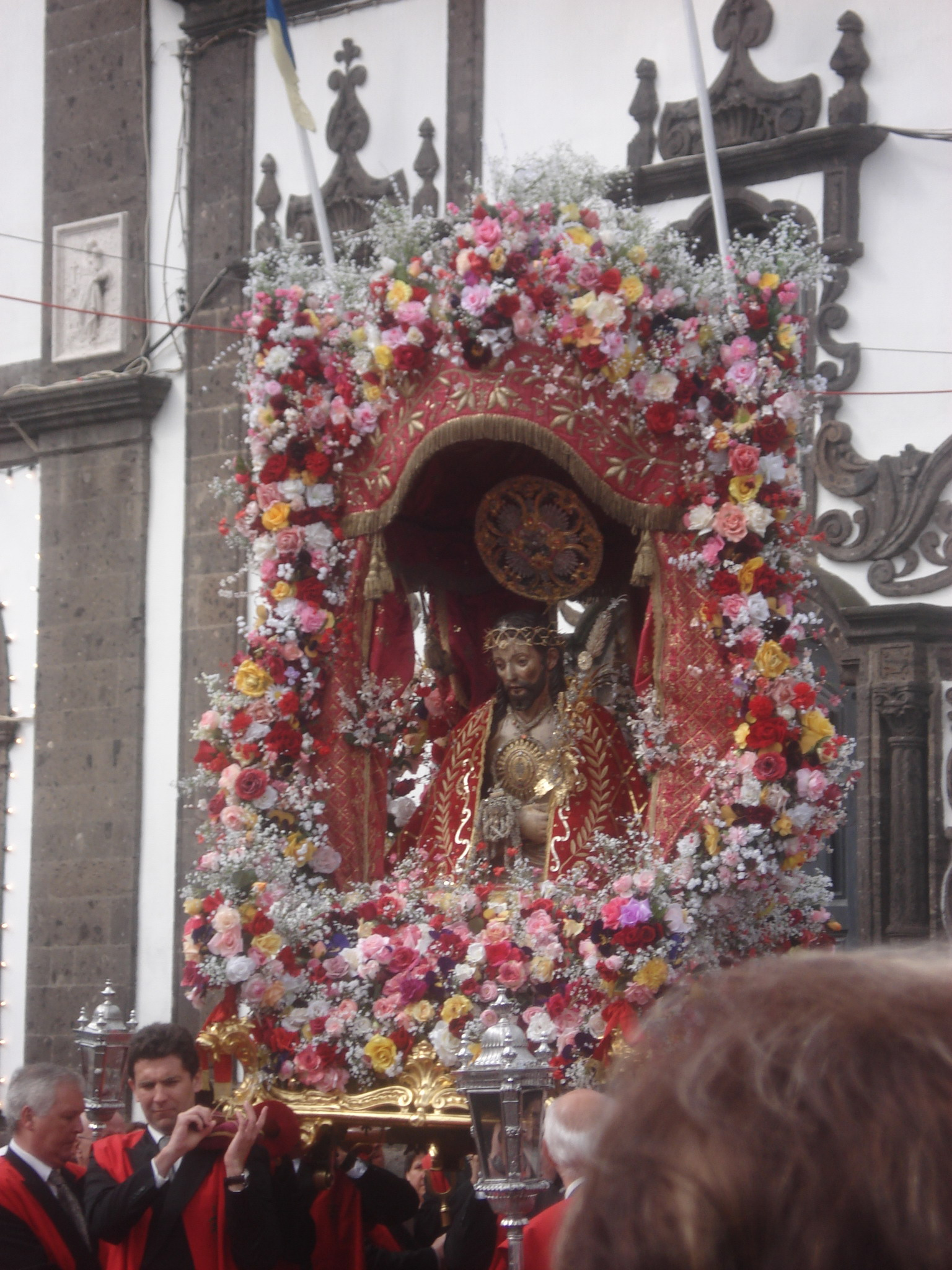
Cult of the Lord Holy Christ of the Miracles: this celebration is the largest and oldest religious event in Portugal

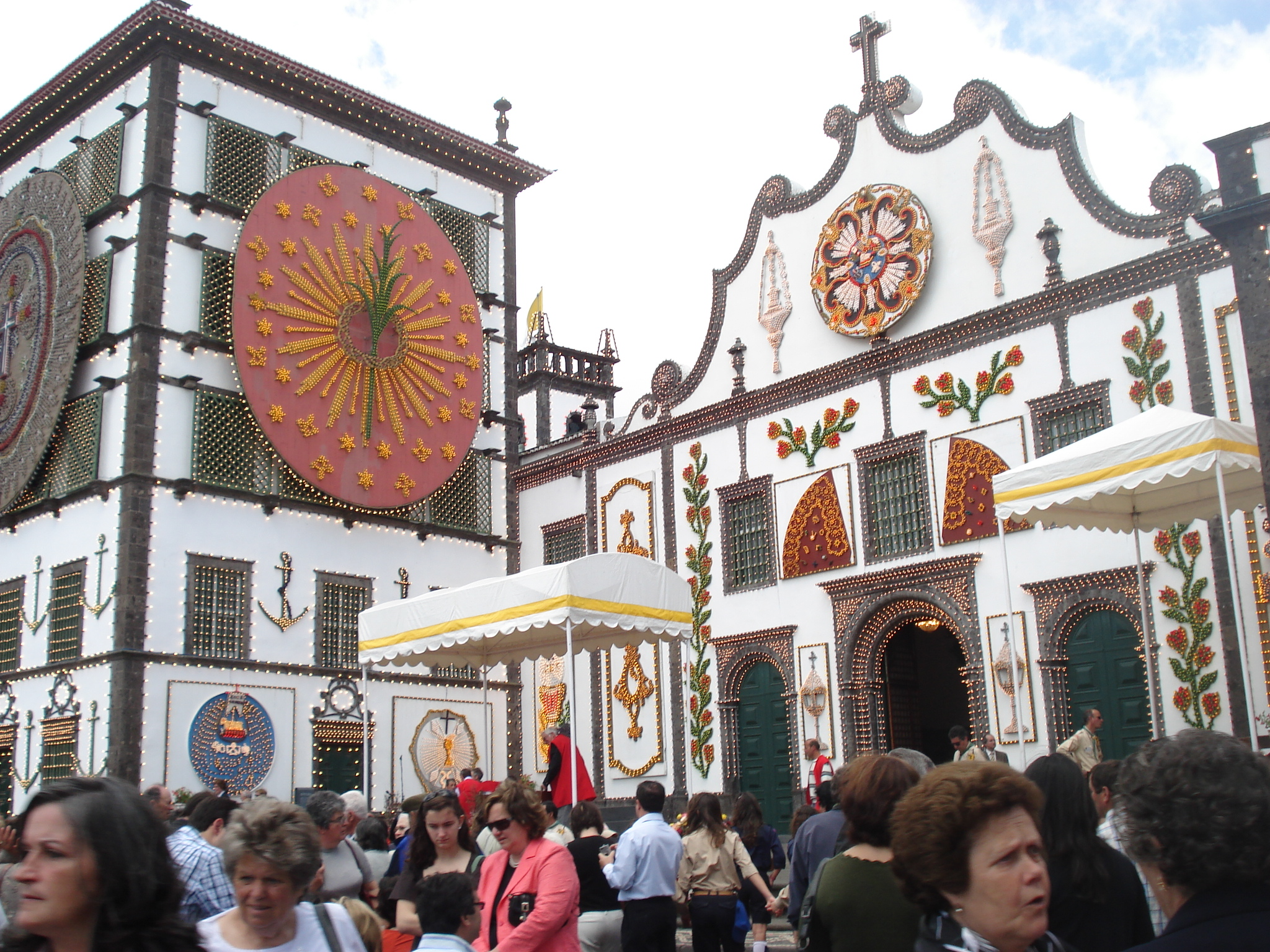
Front façade of the Convent of Our Lady of Hope in Campo de São Francisco, during the events of The Lord Holy Christ of the Miracles

Ponta Delgada is the traditional centre of the annual religious celebrations associated with the Feasts of the Lord Holy Christ of the Miracles (Portuguese: Festas do Senhor Santo Cristo dos Milagres), from the Saint Francis Square (Portuguese: Campo de São Francisco), located opposite the Fort of São Brás. This venerable feast day and week-long celebrations primarily focus on the fifth Sunday of Easter, attracting locals and Micaelense, in addition to peoples from neighbouring islands in the archipelago, the Portuguese diaspora, and tourists on vacation. Associated with the Roman Catholic veneration of an Ecce Homo representing Jesus Christ following the Passion (retold in Luke 23:1–25 in the New Testament), a gift to the sisters of the Convent of Caloura in the mid-16th century, the event paralyzes the streets of the city for a day.

Following the images' move to the Convent of Our Lady of Hope (Portuguese: Convento de Nossa Senhora da Esperança), under the inspiration of the Venerable Mother Teresa da Anunciada, the figure was used in religious processions that snaked through the streets of the city, stopping at each convent (and former-convent) in the city. The cortege, which includes clergy, politicians, and lay folk, is a popular event, attracting both religious (to the procession, sanctuary and open-air mass) and secular participants (to view and see the procession, imagery and taste traditional foods from the barracas located along the main avenue).

Following Pentecosts, many of the parishes within the municipality participate in feasts dedicated to the Holy Spirit. A tradition across the islands of the Azores, the Cult of the Holy Spirit dates to medieval traditions, involving "promises" made to God (Portuguese: promessas), the processions of faith to and from the Church and feasts of meat-broth soup and bread donated to the poor. In comparison to other islands/parishes of the Azores, most neighbourhoods of São Miguel allow the free participation of visitors, seen as fulfilling the tenets of the tradition, rather than the narrow sub-community of the Brotherhoods of the Holy Spirit.

=== Secular ===
One of the more popular non-religious events is the Noites de Verão (Nights of Summer): a summer event, traditionally held in the square of Campo do São Francisco, but in recent years dispersed throughout the streets of the city. Attracting families, friends and tourists to the downtown, highlighted by nightly musical events, popular Azorean bands/singers, guest concert bands, folklore groups, and some international stars, in addition to vendor concessions selling food, refreshments or small goods. Starting usually in late June, the "Summer Nights" run until late September (four months), and is sponsored/supported by the municipal government and local/regional businesses.

== Sport ==
In addition to several parks providing green-spaces for multiple recreational activities, the city of Ponta Delgada is home to sporting associations and sites for racket sports, organized team and open-air activities. In addition to multiple water sports, such as swimming, surfing, and canoeing/kayaking, there are cycling routes and spaces for running/walking. Visitors to the region have access to tourist companies providing excursions to island trails, all-terrain paths and sea oriented activities such as diving, sport fishing, and boat tours.

Home to the Ponta Delgada Football Association, the region has a storied history of football that includes teams that have made it to the 1st and 2nd Divisions of the National Football League. Among them are Club Desportivo Santa Clara (Primeira Liga), Clube União Micaelense, (Portuguese Second Division) and Marítimo da Calheta (São Miguel Regional Championship League).

== Notable people ==
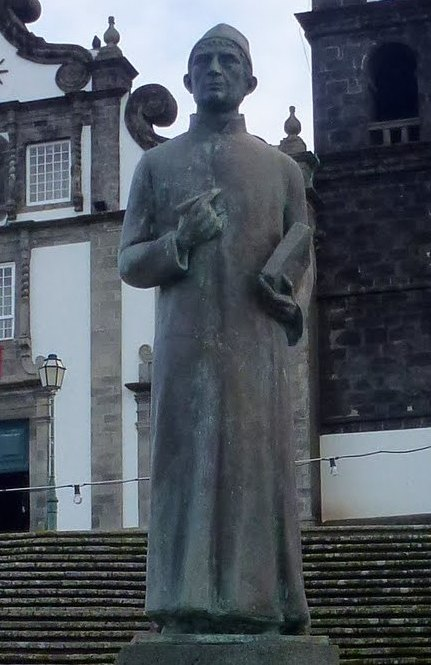
Gaspar Frutuoso

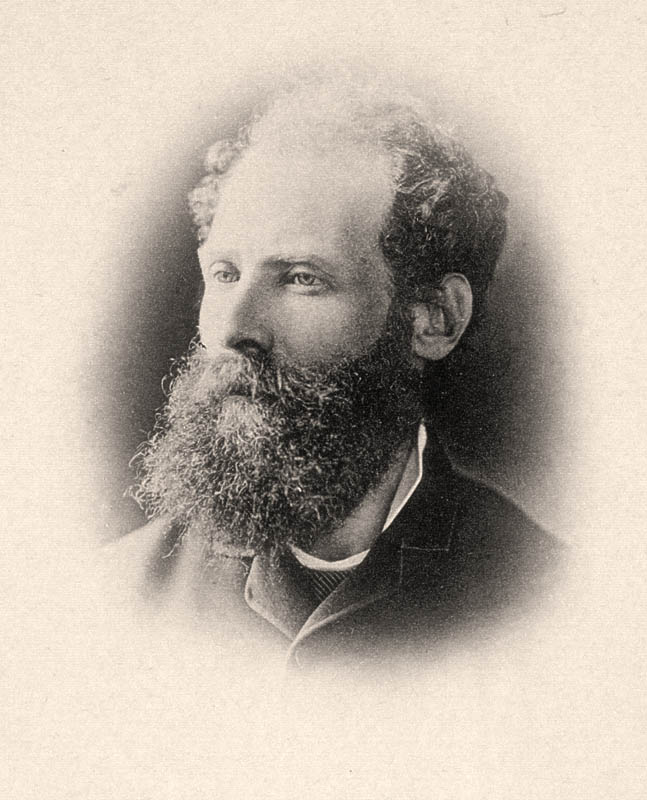
Antero de Quental, ca. 1887

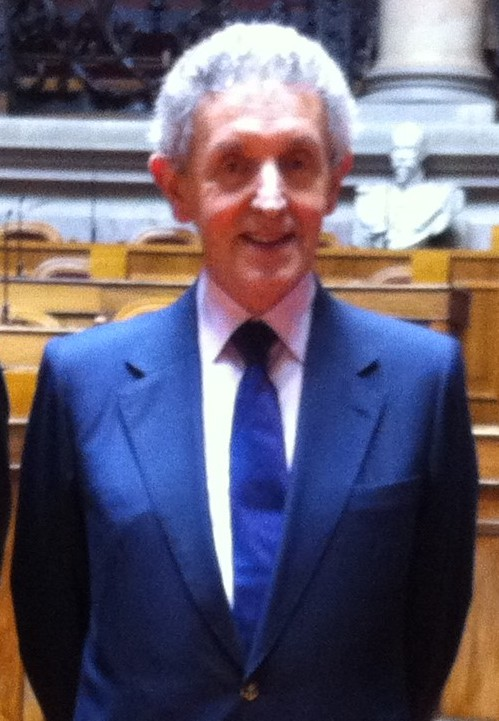
João Bosco Mota Amaral, 2011

- Gaspar Frutuoso (c. 1522–1591) a Portuguese priest, historian, and humanist
- José do Canto (1820–1898) a landowner, gardener, botanist and promoter of agricultural technologies
- Antero de Quental (1842–1891) a poet, philosopher and writer; lead the Questão Coimbrã, (Wiki PT) movement.
- Teófilo Braga (1843 in São José – 1924) writer, playwright and 2nd President of the Republic
- Ernesto Hintze Ribeiro (1849–1907) a politician, statesman and nobleman; 43rd, 45th and 47th Prime Minister of Portugal between 1893 and 1906
- Roberto Ivens (1850–1898) explorer of Africa, geographer, colonial administrator and an officer of the Portuguese Navy
- Maurizio Bensaude (1863–1912) a Portuguese operatic baritone.
- Alice Moderno (1867–1946) writer, feminist and animal rights activist; lived in Ponta Delgada from 1883
- Maria Evelina de Sousa (1879–1946), pioneer educator and feminist; Insignia of Recognition in 2017.
- Fernance B. Perry (1922–2014) MBE, Portuguese-Bermudian entrepreneur and philanthropist
- Natália Correia, (1923 in Fajã de Baixo – 1993) an intellectual, poet, social activist and author of the official lyrics of the Hino dos Açores, the local regional anthem
- Sacuntala de Miranda (1934–2008) historian and political activist
- João Bosco Mota Amaral (born 1943) politician, the first President of the Govt. of the Azores 1976/1995.
- Jaime Gama (born 1947) a former politician, twice Portugal's Foreign Minister
- Vasco Cordeiro (born 1973) a politician, President of the Govt. of the Azores 2012/2020.

=== Sport ===
- Mário Jorge (born 1961) a retired footballer with 235 club caps and 9 for Portugal
- Pedro Miguel Carreiro Resendes, (born 1973), commonly known as Pauleta, a footballer with 459 club caps and 88 for Portugal before being surpassed by Ronaldo
- Paulo Clemente (born 1983) a Portuguese retired footballer with 504 club caps
- Diogo Fonseca (born 1984) a Portuguese former footballer with 357 club caps
- Pedro Pacheco (born 1984) a soccer player with over 450 club caps and 18 for Canada
