= Fajã de Baixo =

- Civil parish
- Location of the civil parish of Fajã de Baixo in the municipality of Ponta Delgada
- Coordinates: 37°45′44″N 25°38′32″W
- Country: Portugal
- Auton. region: Azores
- Island: São Miguel
- Municipality: Ponta Delgada

Area
  - Total: 4.06 km^{2} (1.57 sq mi)
- Elevation: 68 m (223 ft)

Population (2011)
  - Total: 5,050
  - Density: 1,200/km^{2} (3,200/sq mi)
- Time zone: UTC−01:00 (AZOT)
  - Summer (DST): UTC+00:00 (AZOST)
- Postal code: 9500-451
- Area code: 292
- Patron: Nossa Senhora dos Anjos

Fajã de Baixo is a civil parish in the municipality of Ponta Delgada in the Portuguese archipelago of the Azores. The population in 2011 was 5,050, in an area of 4.06 km^{2}. Faja de Baixo is located in the western part of the island of São Miguel, northeast of central Ponta Delgada.

== History ==
The first Church of Fajã was erected in 1532, to support the small community that began to settle in the region. But, this small church was unable to support the growing congregation and was ordered demolished a few years later.

Sometime in 1699, the Hermitage of Lorêto was completed, and served as a primary temple for the community. The main parochial church, dedicated to Our Lady of Angels (Portuguese: Igreja de Nossa Senhora dos Anjos) was eventually constructed in 1791. Meanwhile, the region was a destination of annual pilgrimages, with stops at the smaller temples at the Hermitage of Senhora da Boa Nova and Hermitage of Santa Rita (erected in 1765).

== Notable citizens ==
- Natália Correia (13 September 1923 - 16 March 1993 in Lisbon, Portugal)
- Jaime Gama (born 1947)
