= Candelária (Ponta Delgada) =

- Civil parish
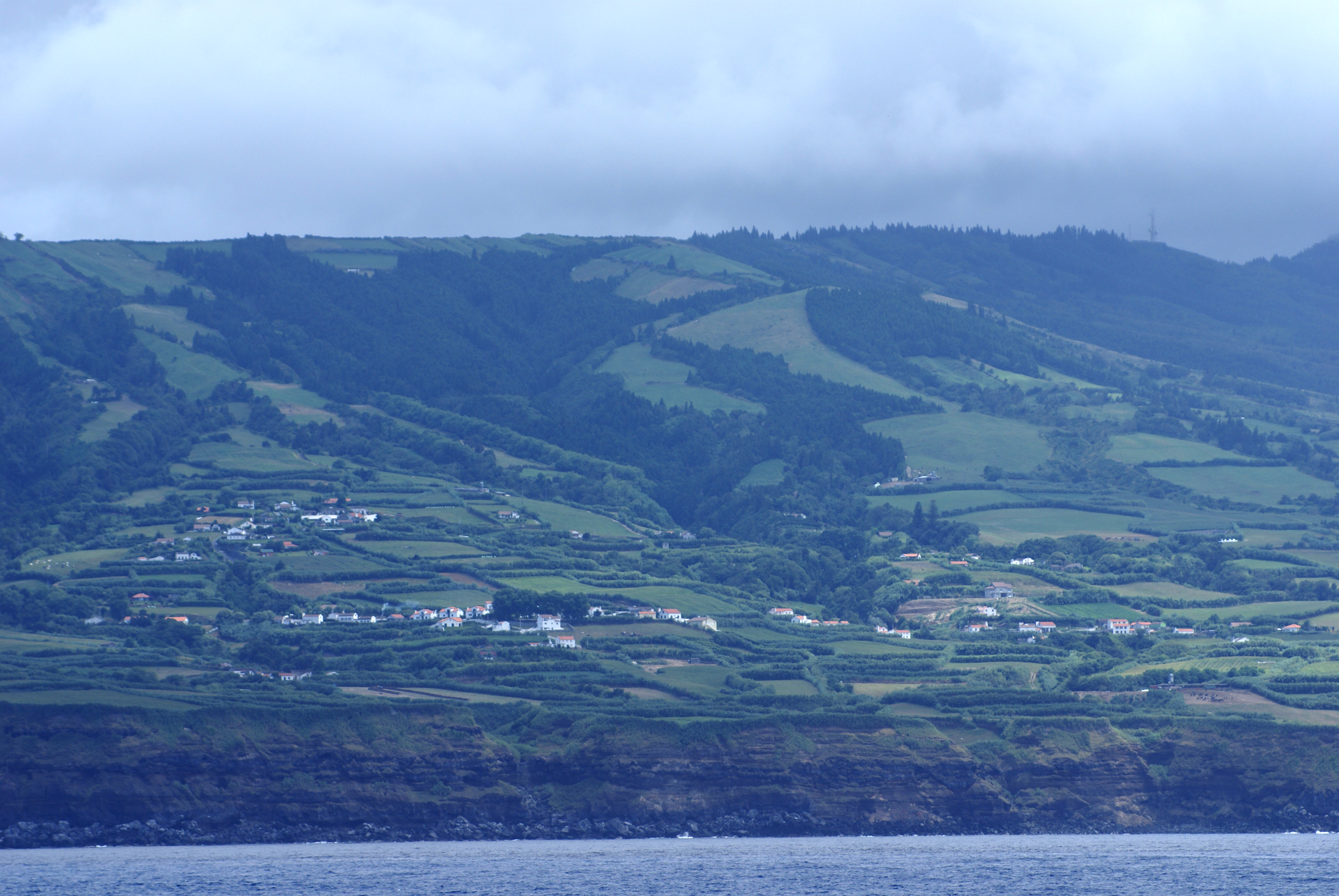
- Candelária as seen from southern coast, São Miguel

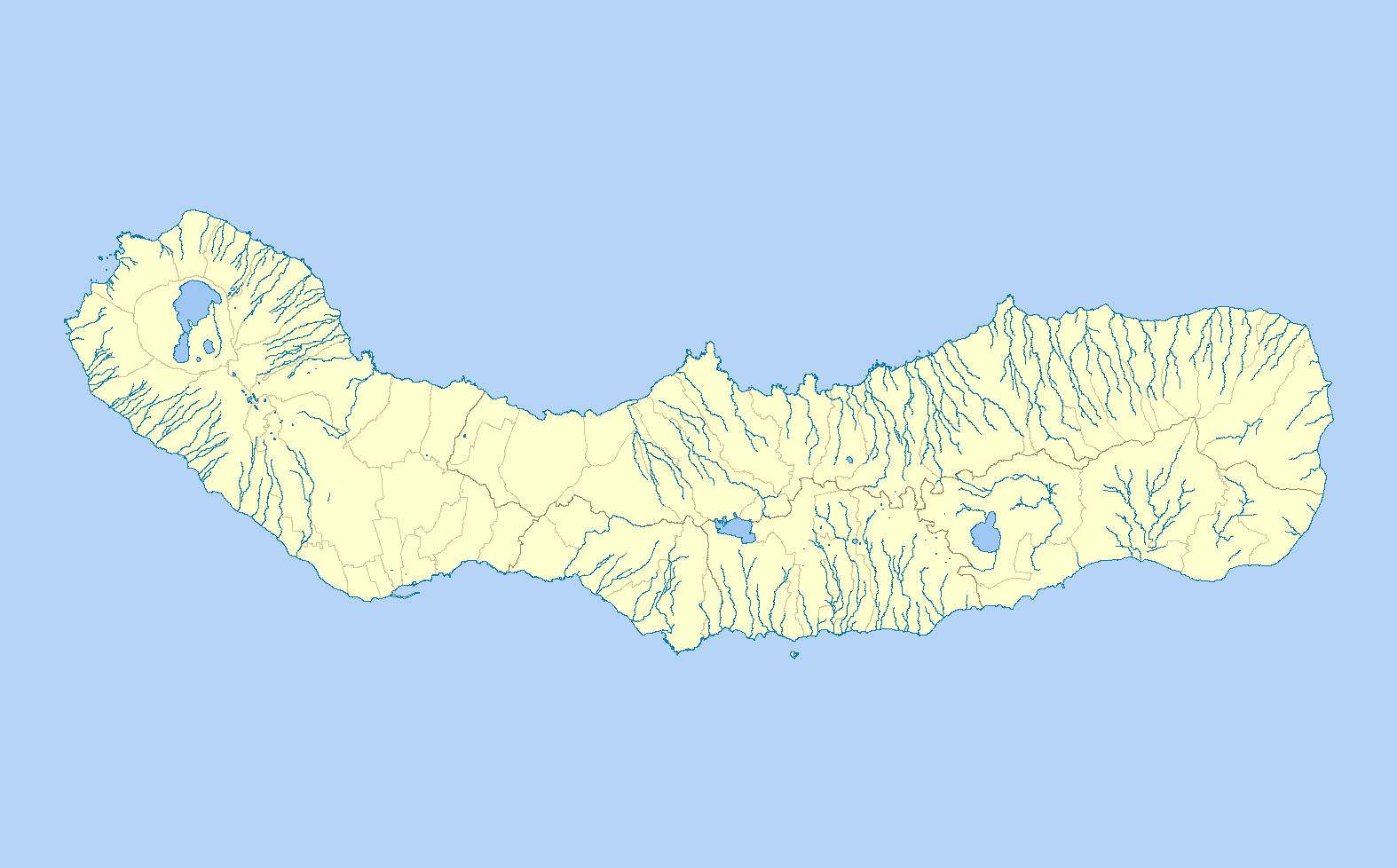
- Location in the Azores Candelária (São Miguel)
- Coordinates: 37°49′39″N 25°48′55″W
- Country: Portugal
- Auton. region: Azores
- Island: São Miguel
- Municipality: Ponta Delgada
- Established: Settlement: fl. 1500; Parish: 28 March 1836

Area
  - Total: 8.63 km^{2} (3.33 sq mi)
- Elevation: 175 m (574 ft)

Population (2011)
  - Total: 1,079
  - Density: 125/km^{2} (324/sq mi)
- Time zone: UTC−01:00 (AZOT)
  - Summer (DST): UTC+00:00 (AZOST)
- Postal code: 9555-024
- Area code: 292
- Patron: Nossa Senhora das Candeias

Candelária is a civil parish in the municipality of Ponta Delgada on the island of São Miguel in the Portuguese archipelago of the Azores. The population in 2011 was 1,079, in an area of 8.63 km². It is situated along the southwest flank of the Sete Cidades massif.

== History ==
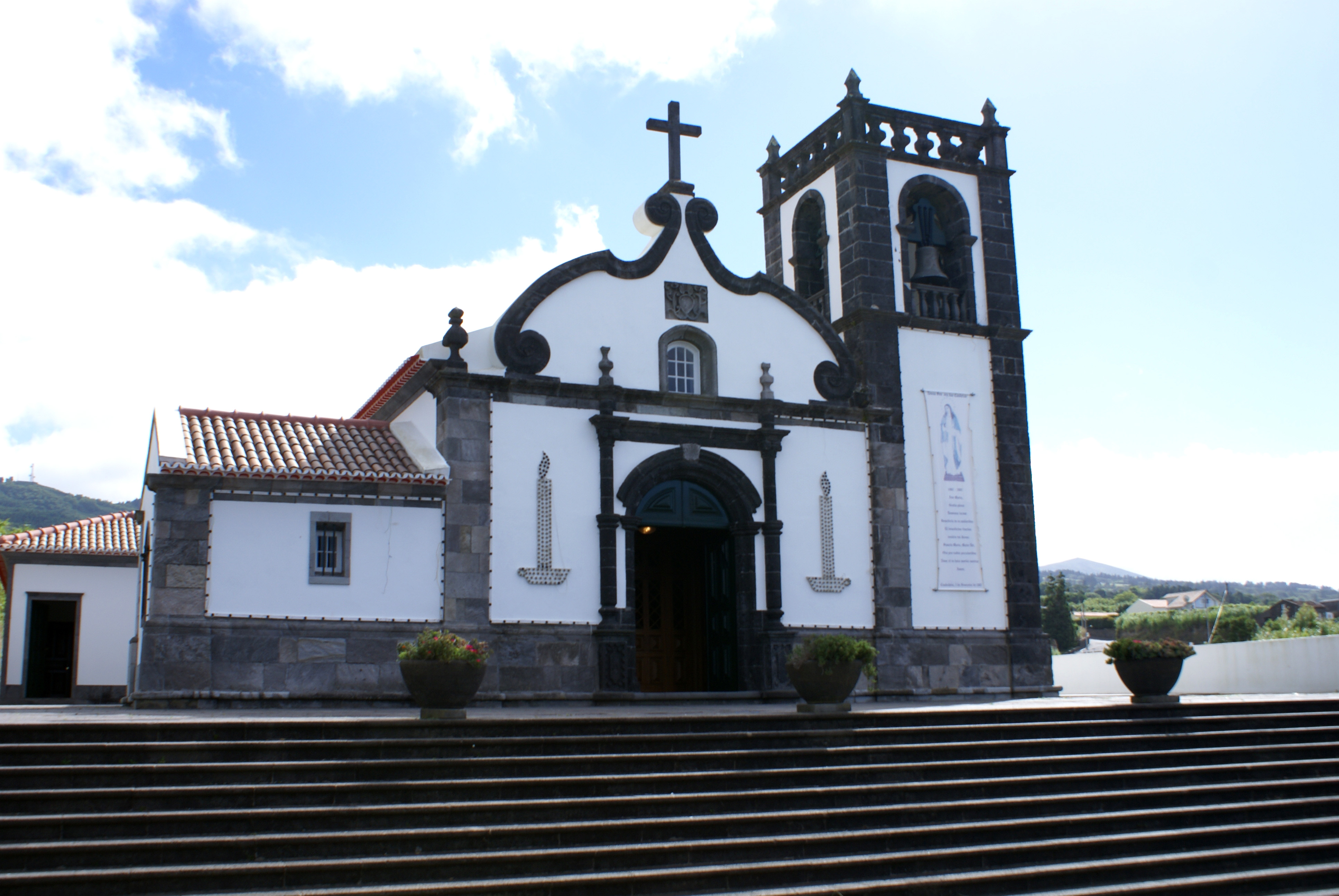
The Church of Nossa Senhora das Candeias, was first referred to in the chronicle of Gaspar Frutuoso

The history of the parish extends back to the 15th century, and was first chronicled in Saudades da Terra by Gaspar Frutuoso. It is unclear when the Hermitage of Nossa Senhora do Socorro was built, although a legend exists that the small chapel was constructed by the crew of a ship that escaped disaster on the high seas. Arriving in the safe waters of Candelária they fired a shot into the air towards shore, and promised to construct a hermitage to Virgin Mary where the bullet fell. Much later, August Loureiro served as the locale for several scenes in his regional novel A Bruxa.

The construction of the current church took place before 1535 in a place that, legend suggests, was not the site originally selected. Most of the builders wanted to rebuild this church on a new site, but after some discussion a decision was made to build on the site of the older hermitage. However, the materials continued to disappear from the build site, and miraculously re-appear on the site where the church is located today. Rumour spread of a veiled woman, who transported the materials nightly after the workers abandoned the site for the evening; strangely, the image of the Virgin was covered in soot every morning, and the townsfolk assumed that it was through the intervention of the saint.

The letter dated 20 July 1568 by the diocese of Angra, raised the stipend of the local vicar from 10$000 to 20$000 cruzados. But, even this document did not refer to the local parochial church of Nossa Senhora das Candeis, but actually to the Church of Nossa Senhora da Purificação of Sete Cidades, suggesting that the parish was part of the parish of Sete Cidades. The first documented reference to Candeis came ion 26 March 1556.

By 1634, the local priest received an annual stipend of 25$000 cruzados and another 3% from the contributions to the Chapel of the Infantes. This remained the standard income for the priests as late as 1730. Between 1632 and 1690, 138$500 cruzados were spent on the church, with several projects in stone alone completed in 1697 for 56$000 cruzados.

This was nothing in comparison with the post-1811 earthquake which damaged the temple, resulting in the Bishop of Angra visiting the site. He ordered the beginning of a new phase of construction that included rebuilding the frontispiece, the installation of a new ceiling, construction of tower and sacristy. Yet, even by 1826, the project had still not been completed.

== Geography ==
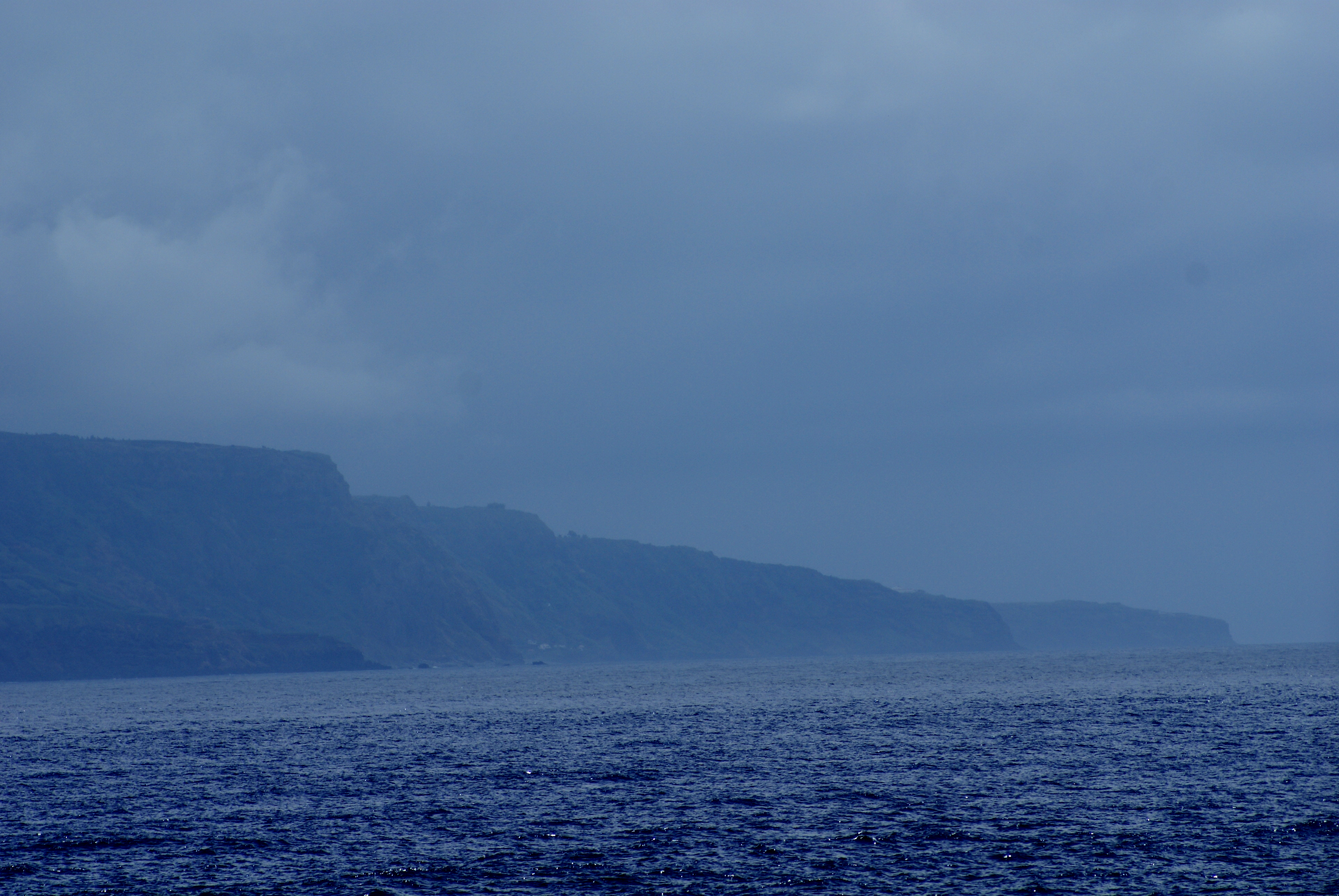
The coastal mists of the parish of Candelária

It is located in the southwestern part of the island of São Miguel, connected by a regional road network (the Estrada Regional E.R.1-1ª) to regional centres of Mosteiros, Ginetes (both to the west), Feteiras (to the east) and indirectly to Ponta Delgada, accessed daily by bus transport. The parish extends from the flanks of the Sete Cidades Massif towards the Atlantic cliffs, and begins in the locality of Chão da Lomba Cruz and extends to village of Socorro (location of the original settlement).

In addition to Chão da Lomba da Cruz and Socorro, there are several other small hamlets or neighbourhoods including: Pinheiros (along the Ribeira do Ferreiro); Lombinha; Albinos; Canto Redondo; Vale; Paríso; Pico; Ramal do Pico; and Canada dos Arrifes. The region is divided between farmlands, which predominate, and forest vegetation along the rim of the Sete Cidades crater (which it borders to the interior).

== Architecture ==
=== Religious ===
- Hermitage of Nossa Senhora do Perpétuo Socorro (Portuguese: Ermida de Nossa Senhora do Perpétuo Socorro)
- Church of Nossa Senhora das Candeias (Portuguese: Igreja Paroquial de Candelária / Igreja de Nossa Senhora das Candeias)
