= Sete Cidades =

Sete Cidades may refer to:

- Sete Cidades (Ponta Delgada), a civil parish in the municipality of Ponta Delgada (Azores), Portugal
- Sete Cidades Massif, Azores, a stratovolcanic complex
- Sete Cidades National Park, national park in the state of Piauí, Brazil
