= Lagoa das Sete Cidades =

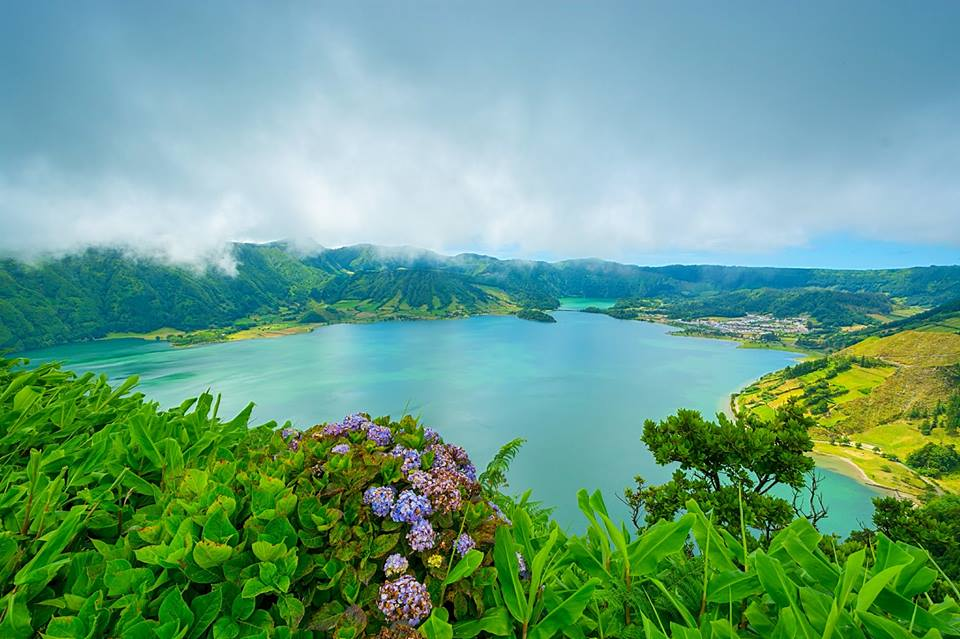
- The twin lake complex of Sete Cidades, formed in the crater of the much larger Sete Cidades Massif

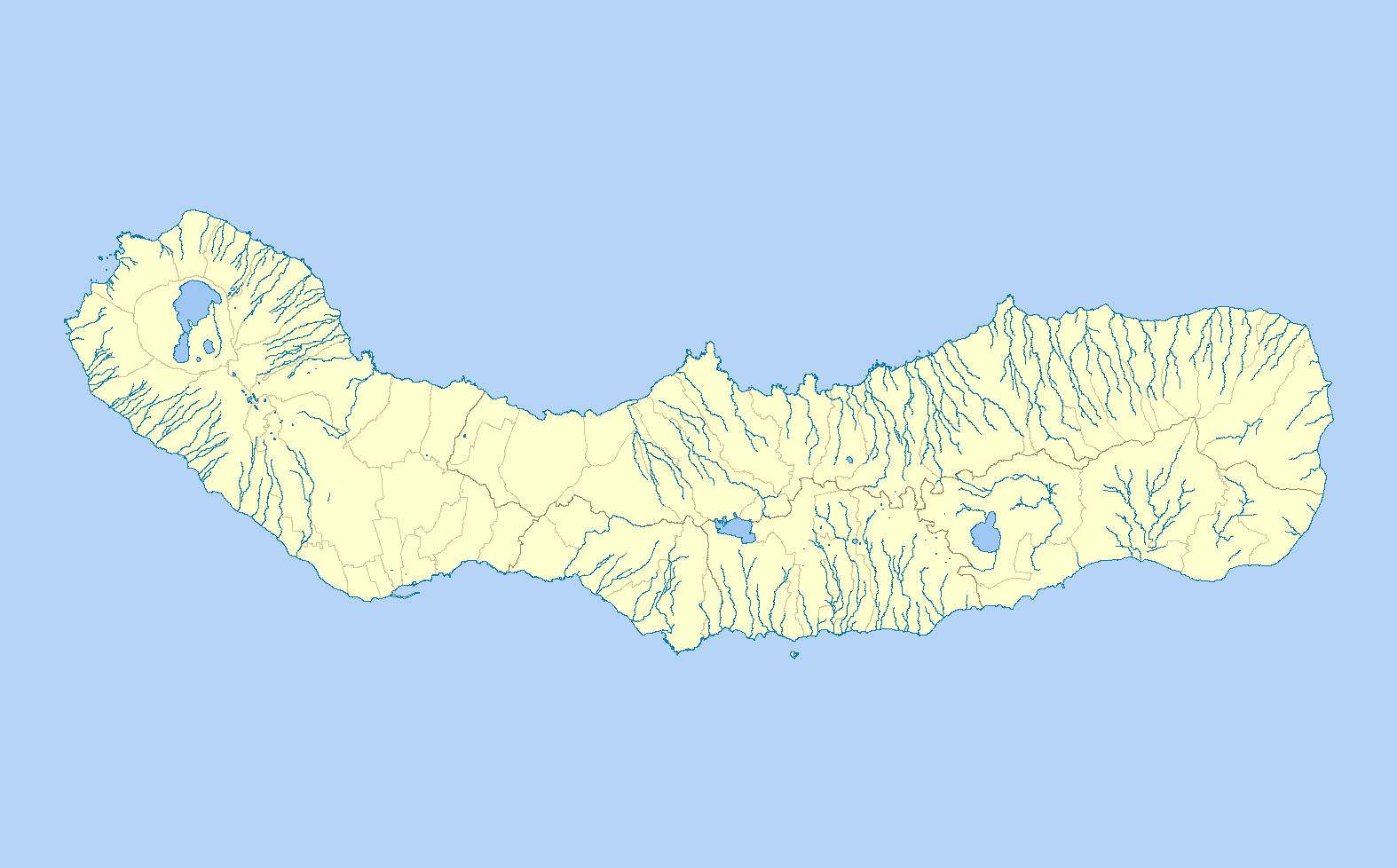
- Location within São Miguel
- Location: Ponta Delgada, São Miguel Island, Azores, Portugal
- Coordinates: 37°51′18″N 25°47′11″W
- Type: Crater lake
- Catchment area: 19.3 km^{2} (7.5 sq mi)
- Basin countries: (Azores)
- Max. length: 4.225 km (2.625 mi)
- Max. width: 2.030 km (1.261 mi)
- Surface area: 4.35 km^{2} (1.68 sq mi)
- Max. depth: 33 m (108 ft)
- Surface elevation: 259 m (850 ft)
- Settlements: Sete Cidades

Lagoa das Sete Cidades (Portuguese: [lɐˈɣoɐ ðɐʃ ˈsɛtɨ siˈðaðɨʃ], "Lagoon of the Seven Cities") is a twin lake situated in the crater of a dormant volcano on the Portuguese archipelago of the Azores. It consists of two small, ecologically different lakes connected by a narrow strait, which is crossed by a bridge. The volcano is located on the western third of the island of São Miguel. The Lagoa das Sete Cidades is part of a natural landscape of communitarian interest: it is the largest body of water in the region and one of the most important freshwater resources in the archipelago.

== Legend ==
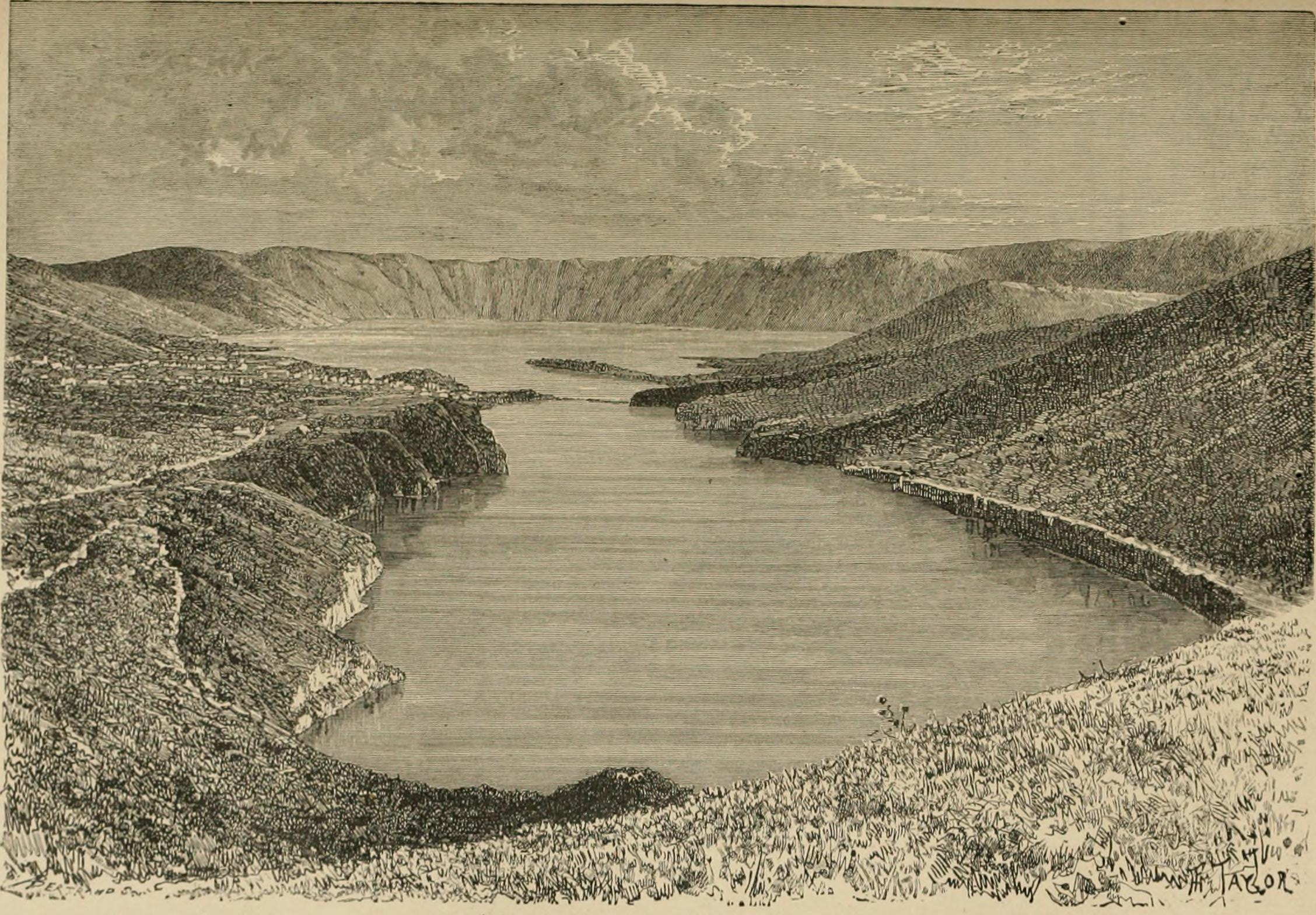
An 1876 engraving/image of Lagoa das Sete Cidades

The ancient story recounts the tale of a bad-tempered widower King and his daughter in a Kingdom in the Western Sea. He was a King, Lord of Alchemy and sorcerer, who lived exclusively for his daughter, Antília, and who would not let the Princess speak to anyone. Apart from the King, the Princess was raised by an old nurse, after the Queen had died. As the years progressed, the princess grew up to be a beautiful young woman and able to attract the attentions of any boy in the kingdom. However, the King restricted her movements to the castle and garden, and few ever saw her. But, unintimidated by her father, and with the help of the nurse, she escaped to the local hills and valleys, as her father slept after his lunch. During one of her escape adventures, she heard a song: the music was beautiful and enchanted her to follow it to its origins. Hiding from view, the princess found a young shepherd playing a flute, sitting on top of a hill. For weeks she returned, listening to the young shepherd, until she was discovered behind some bushes. The shepherd boy fell in love with the princess, and they continued to meet afterwards, talking, laughing and enjoying each other's company, until the boy decided to ask for the princess in marriage.

Early in the morning, the couple knocked on the door of the Castle, and asked the servants to speak to the King. Very nervous but determined, the shepherd asked the King for his daughter in marriage. Reacting angrily, the King refused and expelled him from the Castle, and forbade his daughter from seeing the young boy. Not wishing more ill feelings, she followed the orders of her father, but met secretly with the shepherd that afternoon in order to tell him that she would never see him again. Antília and the shepherd boy cried all afternoon, embracing, and their tears formed two beautiful lakes, one green, for the Princess's eyes were green, and the other blue, for the shepherd's eyes were likewise colored.

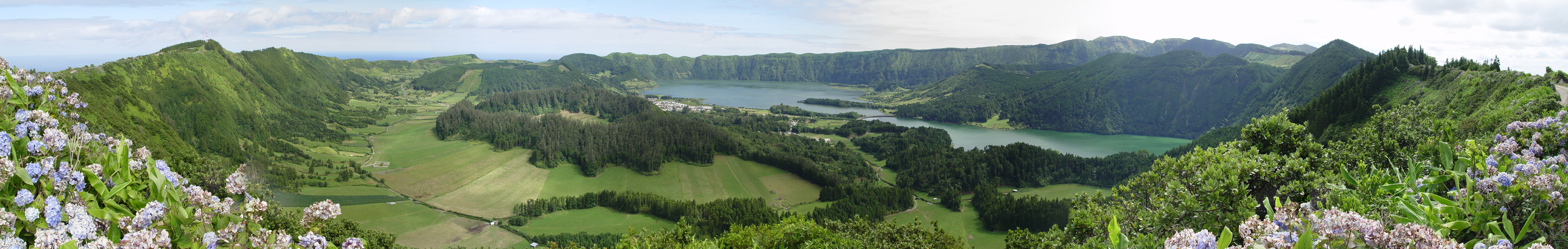
Panorama of the Lagoa das Sete Cidades, showing the Blue Lake (left) and the Green Lake (right) divided by bridge

== Geography ==
The lake is situated within the caldera of the Sete Cidades Massif, an ancient volcano built on various layers of ash, pyroclasts and trachyte and basaltic lavas. It is a stratovolcano constructed from alternating phases of explosive and effusive ejecta, from dominantly basaltic pre-caldera eruptions, a trachytic caldera-forming stage and a post-caldera stage consisting of alternating trachytic and basaltic eruptions. The caldera-forming eruption was triggered by a basaltic injection into a shallow trachytic magma chamber.

These geomorphological structures allowed varying hydrochemical properties and produced many types of springs and water circulation networks (Coutinho et al., 1996). Generally, formations with good hydrodynamic properties include areas with lava flows, basaltic pyroclasts and/or pumice, while solidified ignimbrites, conditioned by high temperatures and paleosols, such as ash, have produced impermeable conditions. The aquifers are dependent on reduced permeability, or secondary volcanoes with hydrogeologically significant volumes. Consequently, the accumulation of ash at the bottom of the craters and caldera has conditioned the formation of lakes.

Although, hydrologically, the Lagoa das Sete Cidades is one lake, most refer to it as two separate bodies: Lagoa Verde and Lagoa Azul. Literally, the Green Lake and the Blue Lake (respectively), they are so named because each side of the lake reflects the sunlight in different colors.

== Human impacts ==
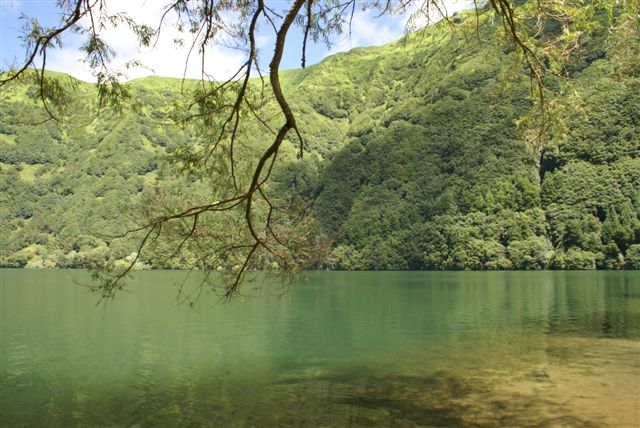
The Blue Lake as seen from the edge of the water; phytoplankton blooms have caused the normally blue water to seem green

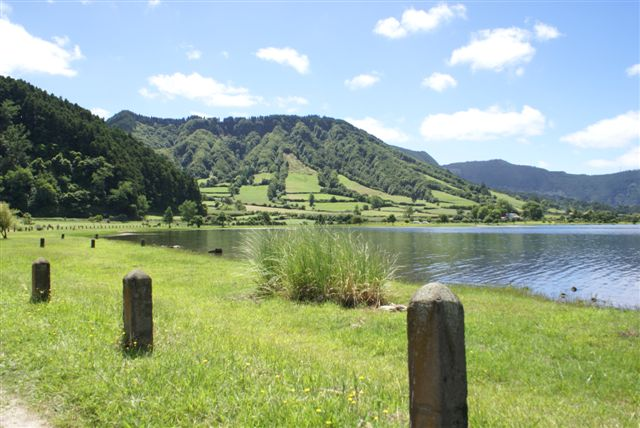
Area in the northwest corner of the Green Lake, utilized as recreational space

In the middle of the twentieth century, the destruction of forested areas in the natural catchment area of the lake, and their transformation into grassland and pasture, increased the runoff of nutrients, particularly phosphorus and nitrogen, from the steep land. Lacking a domestic sewage system until recently, the community of Sete Cidades contributed to gradual pressures on the ecosystem, resulting in an overabundant development of rooted aquatic macrophytes and algae in the water bodies. The eutrophication of the Lagoa das Sete Cidades lakes, due to nutrient enrichment was enhanced by human agricultural and domestic activities, began to be noticed in 1987 and led to the implementation of a monitoring program. Measurements taken at the time, that included the examination of Carlson's Trophic state index, the measure of chlorophyll, inorganic nitrogen and phosphorus in the water column were made, showing increases in all measures. While phytoplankton populations varied throughout the year in the Lagoa Azul, the presence of phytoplankton in the Lagoa Verde persisted annually, dominated by cyanobacteria. When temperature, light and nutrient availability are adequate to phytoplankton growth, surface waters may host algae or cyanobacteria blooms. In eutrophic waters, cyanobacteria often dominate the summer and early autumn phytoplankton, while during winter and spring they are replaced by diatoms.

As the existence of a eutrophication process in Sete Cidades lake was already known since the 1980s, the rise of cyanobacteria blooms was not unexpected by 2000. Although average total phosphorus concentration inside the lake was not very high, concentrations found in winter samples proved that there was an important runoff of fertilised water from the watershed. High levels of cynotoxins were found in 2002 in the Blue Lake. Lake water within the watershed is not potable, but recreational use, like swimming and windsurfing, were common practices, although advisories were placed along the lakes to warn of bloom toxicity and associated health dangers.

Although the lake's water quality has improved since 2000, cyanobacteria blooms have negatively affected the situation in the lake. Consequently, the Regional Government began preparation of a new territorial examination of the situation within the crater. The Plano de Ordenamento da Bacia Hidrográfica da Lagoa das Sete Cidades (POBHLSC) (English: Sete Cidades Watershed Land Management Plan) was implemented to evaluate the conditions of the lake, establish methods of interdiction and monitorization of landuse initiatives.

== See also ==
- Sete Cidades (Ponta Delgada)
