= Ginetes =

- Civil parish
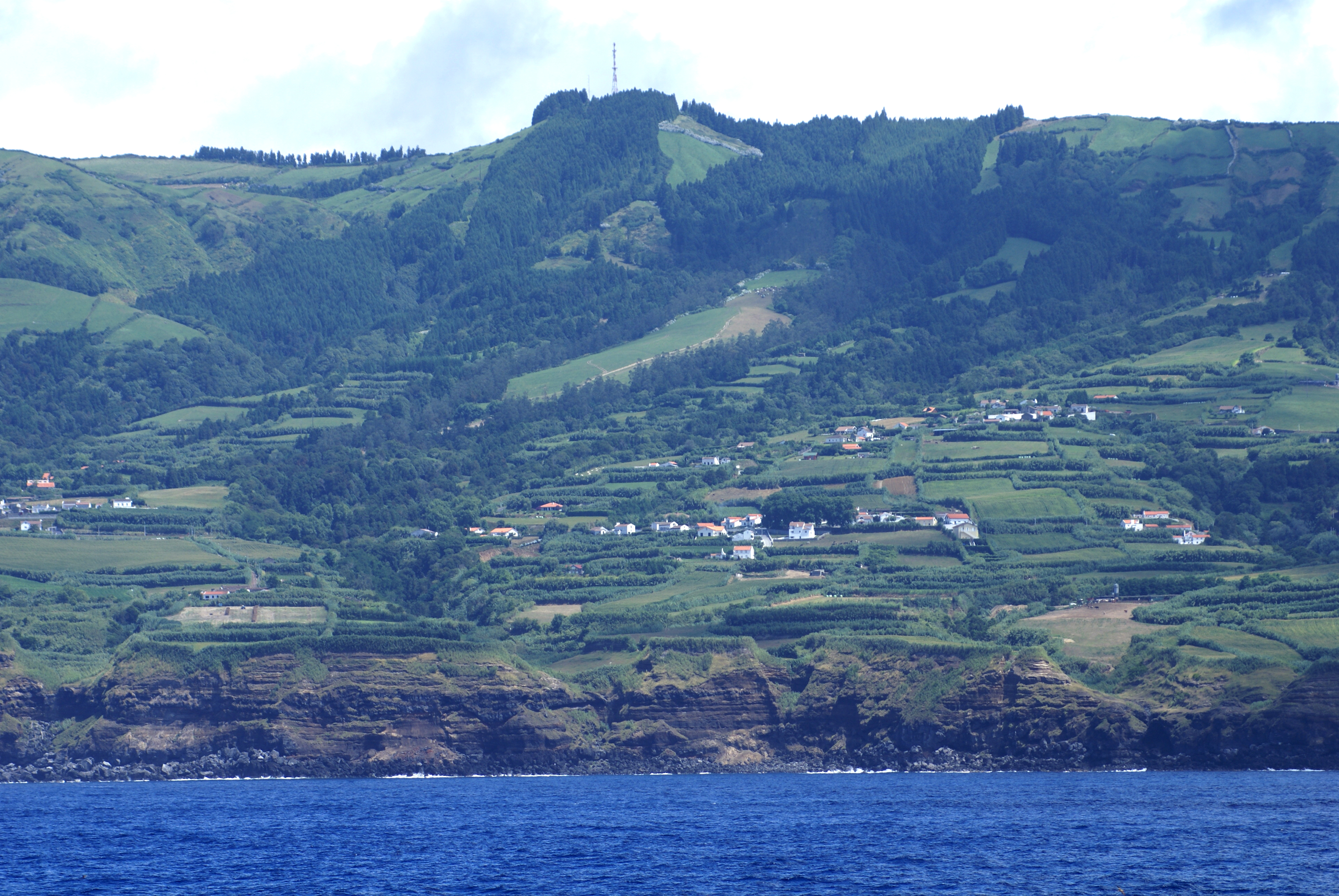
- The western coast of Ginetes, showing the localities of Lomba de Cima and Lomba dos Gagos, along the eastern frontier with Candelária

- Location of the civil parish of Ginetes in the municipality of Ponta Delgada
- Coordinates: 37°50′53″N 25°50′21″W
- Country: Portugal
- Auton. region: Azores
- Island: São Miguel
- Municipality: Ponta Delgada

Area
  - Total: 12.14 km^{2} (4.69 sq mi)
- Elevation: 139 m (456 ft)

Population (2011)
  - Total: 1,378
  - Density: 113.5/km^{2} (294.0/sq mi)
- Time zone: UTC−01:00 (AZOT)
  - Summer (DST): UTC+00:00 (AZOST)
- Postal code: 9555-064
- Area code: 292
- Patron: São Sebastião

Ginetes is a civil parish in the municipality of Ponta Delgada on the island of São Miguel in the Portuguese of the Azores. It is situated in the westernmost part of the island, near the coast. The population in 2011 was 1,378, in an area of 12.14 square kilometres (4.69 mi^{2}).

== History ==
At the earliest part of the island's settlement, this region was known as the parish of São Sebastião, based on its patron saint. The region was given the new name owing to its proximity to the Pico dos Genetantes, which was transliterated into Ginetes. Father Gaspar Frutuoso, writing in his tome Saudades da Terra, reiterated that the settlement obtained its name because it was sheltered from ocean winds by the Pico dos Ginetes, called this [Ginetes] because it took the form of a saddle, as well as (as others had indicated) where Ginetes (a species of horse) was raised, in the mountains.

The parish church, dedicated to St. Sebastian, was constructed between 1603 and 1605, to substitute an older temple that existed since early settlement. The religious community also constructed the Church of Jesus, Mary and Jesus in the locality of Várzeam erected in 1702 (and, later, the hermitage of Nossa Senhora da Fátima, built along the regional roadway, and concluded in September 1936).

It is suggested that the historic Casa do Monte (House of the Hill), located within Ginetes, was the first location where the autonomic flag was first raised over the territory of the Azores, in 1897.

== Geography ==
Situated on the western coast of São Miguel, the parish of Ginetes is one of the more extense of the municipality of Ponta Delgada. In addition to the main village of Ginetes, the parish includes the small village of Várzea, and the localities Lomba de Cima, Lomba dos Gagos, Moio, São Sebastião and Topo.

== Architecture ==
- Church of São Sebastião (Portuguese: Igreja de São Sebastião), its architecture resulted from various alterations over the centuries.

== Culture ==
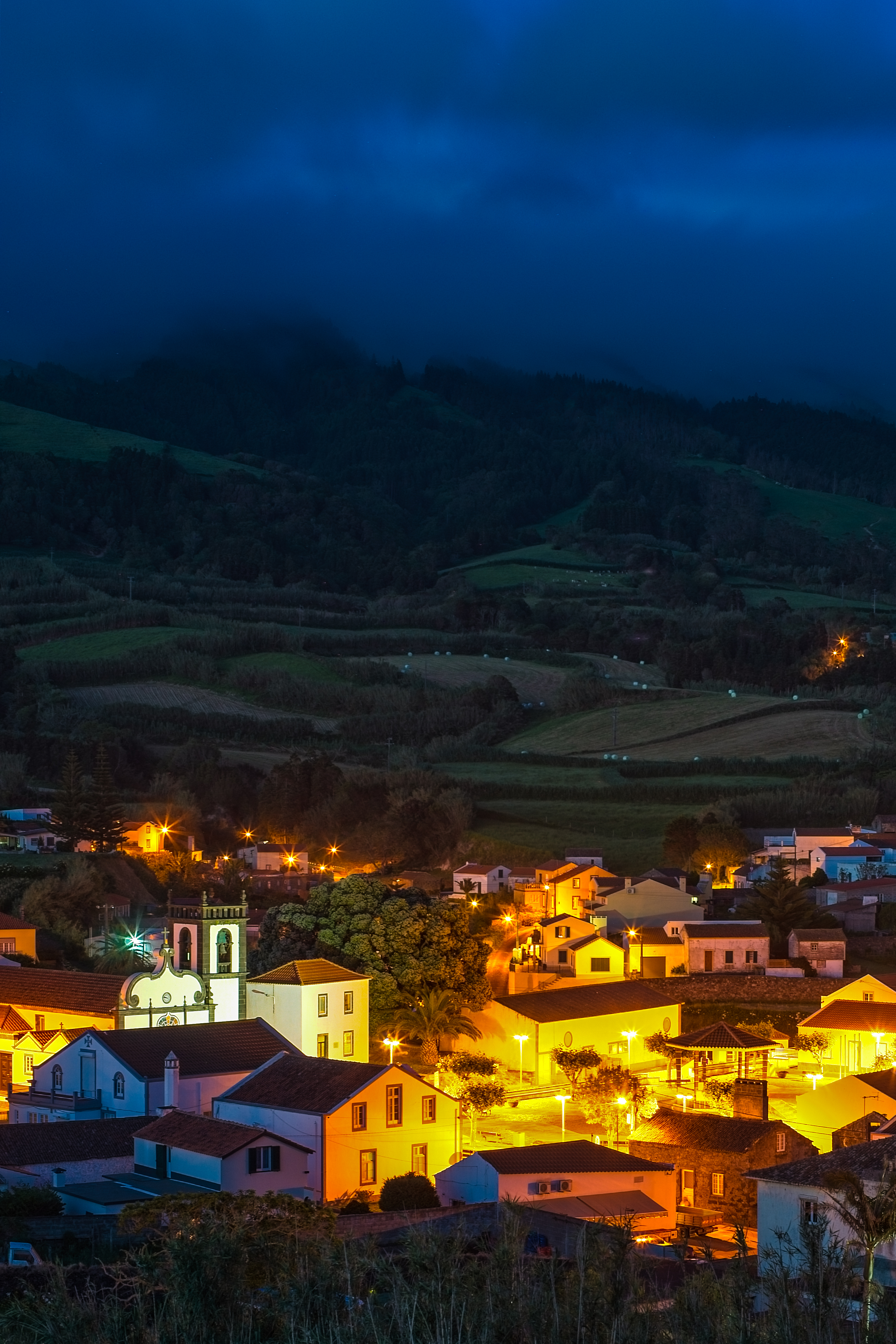
Ginetes by night.

The parish realizes religious festivals in honor of the patron saint (São João) in the month of June, while in Várzea, celebrations marking the Holy Family occur in the last weekend of July. Secular events include the local philharmonic band (Filarmónica Minerva de Ginetes) festivities on the first weekend of August, that includes a procession of traditional carts and allegorical floats.
