= Ferdinand van Olmen =

- Other names: Fernan Duolmo; Hernan Dolinos; Fernan Dolmos
- Occupation: Explorer

Ferdinand van Olmen (Portuguese: Fernão d'Ulmo; fl. 1486 – c. 1487) was an explorer from the County of Flanders who, in 1486, was commissioned by the Portuguese King John II to chart a western route from the Azores. Five years later, Christopher Columbus sailed a similar route from the Canary Islands to the New World.

== Voyage ==
Van Olmen was a knight and captain who resided on the Azorean island of Terceira, situated in the middle of the Atlantic Ocean. During prolonged periods of westerly winds, pieces of wood would frequently wash ashore on these islands. As a result, it was theorized that land must exist further to the west. In 1486, Van Olmen, together with his partner, João Afonso do Estreito, approached King John II with a proposal to organize an expedition to the west at their own expense. Van Olmen stated that he was attempting to find a large island, islands, or a mainland, presumably the legendary Antillia, or, as the Portuguese called it, the Island of the Seven Cities. The king granted them a letters patent and assigned a German knight to accompany them, possibly Martin Behaim. Van Olmen provided nautical expertise, while the do Estreito assumed responsibility for the financing. As a reward, the pair sought hereditary governance over any territories they might discover. King John II had previously rejected a similar proposal from Christopher Columbus; however, Van Olmen received approval, likely because he did not request any financial contribution from the royal court. The contract stipulated a forty-day voyage, during which Van Olmen was to hold command. It can be presumed that the explorers had a reasonably clear idea of what they were undertaking, suggesting they had either previously sighted coastlines or observed birds and driftwood.

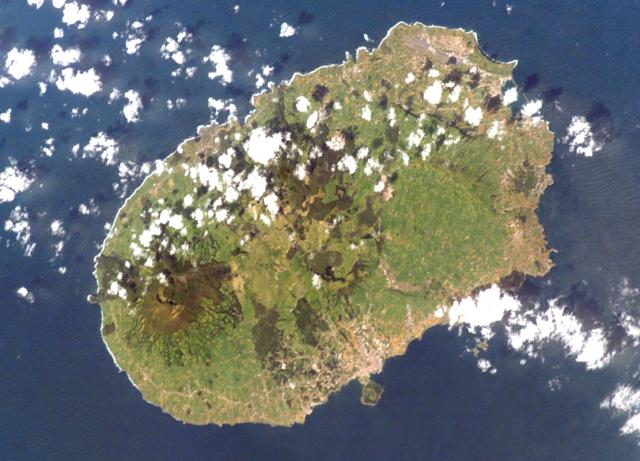
Van Olmen held a captaincy in the north of Terceira (pictured)

They planned to depart from Terceira with two caravels by early March 1487 at the latest, carrying enough supplies for six months. However, nothing is known regarding the course of the expedition. Belgian historian Charles Verlinden believes that the entire crew perished at sea. He based this conclusion on a note by Bartolomé de las Casas, arguing that a winter departure from the northern Azores would have forced the expedition to struggle against the belt of westerly winds. These winds may have driven the ships toward the waters of Newfoundland and Labrador, as had reportedly happened earlier to Diogo de Teive. Another possibility is that the expedition never actually set sail. Another possibility is that, at the last moment, Van Olmen was recalled to Lisbon because of a dispute over captaincies involving João Vaz Corte-Real and Antão Martins, which threatened to disrupt the colonization of Terceira. By June 1487, he was reportedly back on Terceira, though it is possible he had never left the island.

Whether lost at sea or prevented from sailing, the Van Olmen expedition was, in any case, Portugal’s final attempt to discover land in the Atlantic. The following year, in 1488, Bartolomeu Dias sailed into the Tagus with news that he had discovered the Cape of Good Hope. Portugal now committed itself fully to the eastern route to India. Four years later, Columbus would discover America while sailing for Spain. Unlike Van Olmen, he followed a more southerly course, benefiting from the northeast trade winds at his back.

== Other names ==
The name Van Olm or Van Olmen is nowhere documented as such. It is an inferred name, based on his origins in the southern Netherlands. Elsewhere, he is referred to as Fernan Duolmo, Hernan Dolinos, or Fernan Dolmos.
