= Feteiras =

- Civil parish
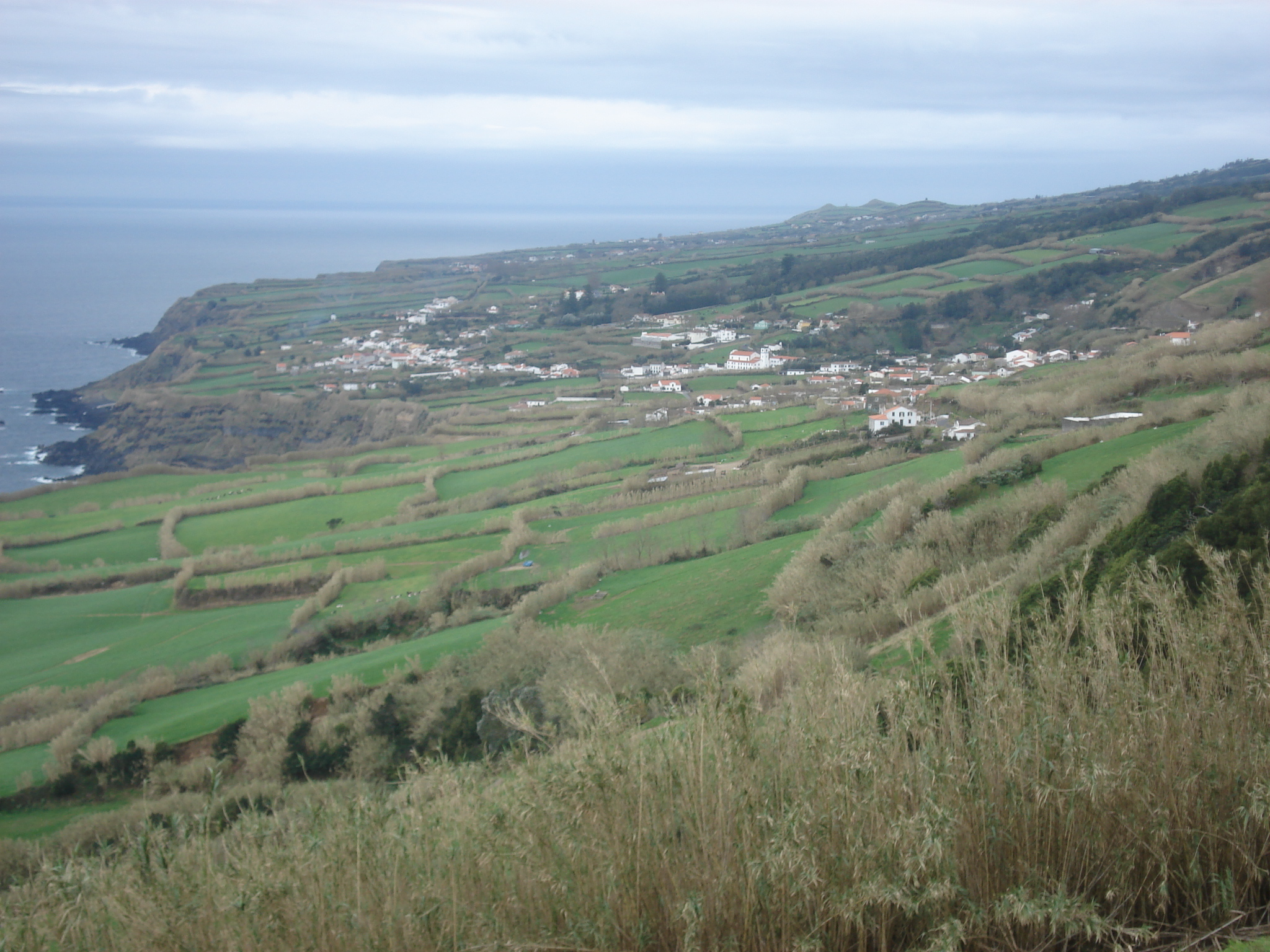
- The coastal plain of Feteiras, with its surroundings of pasturelands and subdivided parcels

- Location of the civil parish of Feteiras in the municipality of Ponta Delgada
- Coordinates: 37°48′58″N 25°46′31″W
- Country: Portugal
- Auton. region: Azores
- Island: São Miguel
- Municipality: Ponta Delgada

Area
  - Total: 23.53 km^{2} (9.08 sq mi)
- Elevation: 406 m (1,332 ft)

Population (2011)
  - Total: 1,571
  - Density: 66.77/km^{2} (172.9/sq mi)
- Time zone: UTC−01:00 (AZOT)
  - Summer (DST): UTC+00:00 (AZOST)
- Postal code: 9500-554
- Area code: 292
- Patron: Santa Luzia

Feteiras is a civil parish in the municipality of Ponta Delgada in the Portuguese archipelago of the Azores. It is situated in the western part of the island of São Miguel, on the south coast. The population in 2011 was 1,571, in an area of 23.53 square kilometres (9.08 mi^{2}).

== History ==
In the 16th century, the coastal area around the Porto dos Batéis (a name derived from the construction of a great carrack in the locale), was the principal settlement. This lowland region was eventually abandoned and settlers began populating the highland region above the cliffs, extending along the roadway that developed.

Father Lopez da Luz, writing in the Revista Micaelense, noted that the beginnings of settlement in this region, occurred half a century after the island's settlement. Gaspar Frutuoso, writing in Saudades da Terra indicated that it obtained the name Feteiras for the pasturelands of ferns that grew in the pasturelands. Has he noted:

"...and the arriba, on land, is the place of Feteiras that obtained this name because there existed many ferns, in a land that is low and high, very well shaded, that it wants this area to be like on the island of Madeira, whose parish, is to the invocation of Santa Luzia".

By royal charter, from King Manuel I Feteiras was de-annexed from the jurisdiction of Vila Franca do Campo and integrated into the municipality of Ponta Delgada. By the end of the 15th century, Father Lopes da Luz, indicated that the parish of Santa Luzia das Feteiras had already existed for some time. Ironically, though, the parish church was dedicated to Our Lady of Guadalupe (Portuguese: Igreja de Nossa Senhora de Guadalupe), and was the parish seat, since the original church to Santa Luzia was in ruin by the end of the 16th century.

By the beginning of the 19th century, the estimated population of 860 people of the parish, was supported by the remodelled and expanded church of Nossa Senhora da Guadalupe, which was rechristened to Santa Luzia. The older image from the abandoned church was quickly transported to the new church, and placed in one of the altars. By the beginning of the 20th century, the population had surpassed 1000 residents.

== Geography ==
Population of Feteiras (1864 - 2011)
Year	Pop.	±%
1864	1,777	—
1878	2,110	+18.7%
1890	2,100	−0.5%
1900	2,122	+1.0%
1911	2,021	−4.8%
1920	1,935	−4.3%
1930	1,962	+1.4%
1940	2,411	+22.9%
1950	2,569	+6.6%
1960	2,411	−6.2%
1971	1,837	−23.8%
1981	1,558	−15.2%
1991	1,644	+5.5%
2001	1,709	+4.0%
2011	1,571	−8.1%

Feteiras is situated along the southern coast of the island, extending into the interior, with its highest point being along the Sete Cidades Massif in area of Fonte da Serra, at junction of various parishes including Sete Cidades, Santo António and Capelas. In addition to these parishes, Feteiras is bounded on the east by Relva and west by Candelária and connected by the regional E.R.1-1ª roadway to the island centre of Ponta Delgada, some 15 kilometres (9.3 mi) to the east.

This sloping region of forest and pasturelands extend from the coastal cliff at approximately 115 metres (377 ft) above sea level (at its maximum) to the summit of Éguas, at 873 metres (2,864 ft). This hilltop over looks the parishes lakes region and includes the volcanic lakes of Lagoa de Éguas (Éguas Norte and Éguas Sul) and Lagoa Rasa, in addition to the smaller pools of Caldeirão Pequeno Norte and Caldeirão Pequeno Sul. Trails interconnect the waterbodies, as well as the nearby lakes twin lakes, the Lagoas Empadadas (in Capelas).

The main village parallels the regional roadway, along a stretch of road beginning at Grota da Areia (near the main lookout from Ponta Delgada). This stretch of road winds down the hillside and laterally to the main square at Rua do Fonte and Rua da Igreja, before continuing pass the parochial church and administrative centre, and out towards Caminho Velho, where it meets the E.R.1-1ª once more and ends at the border. In between are smaller neighborhoods that include Grota do Ramal, Canada da Cruz, Chã do Tanque, Jardim and Biscoito, each distinct parts of the parish. Such as Chã do Porto and Canada do Porto, road segments and neighborhood that lead to the old port along the coast.

== Economy ==
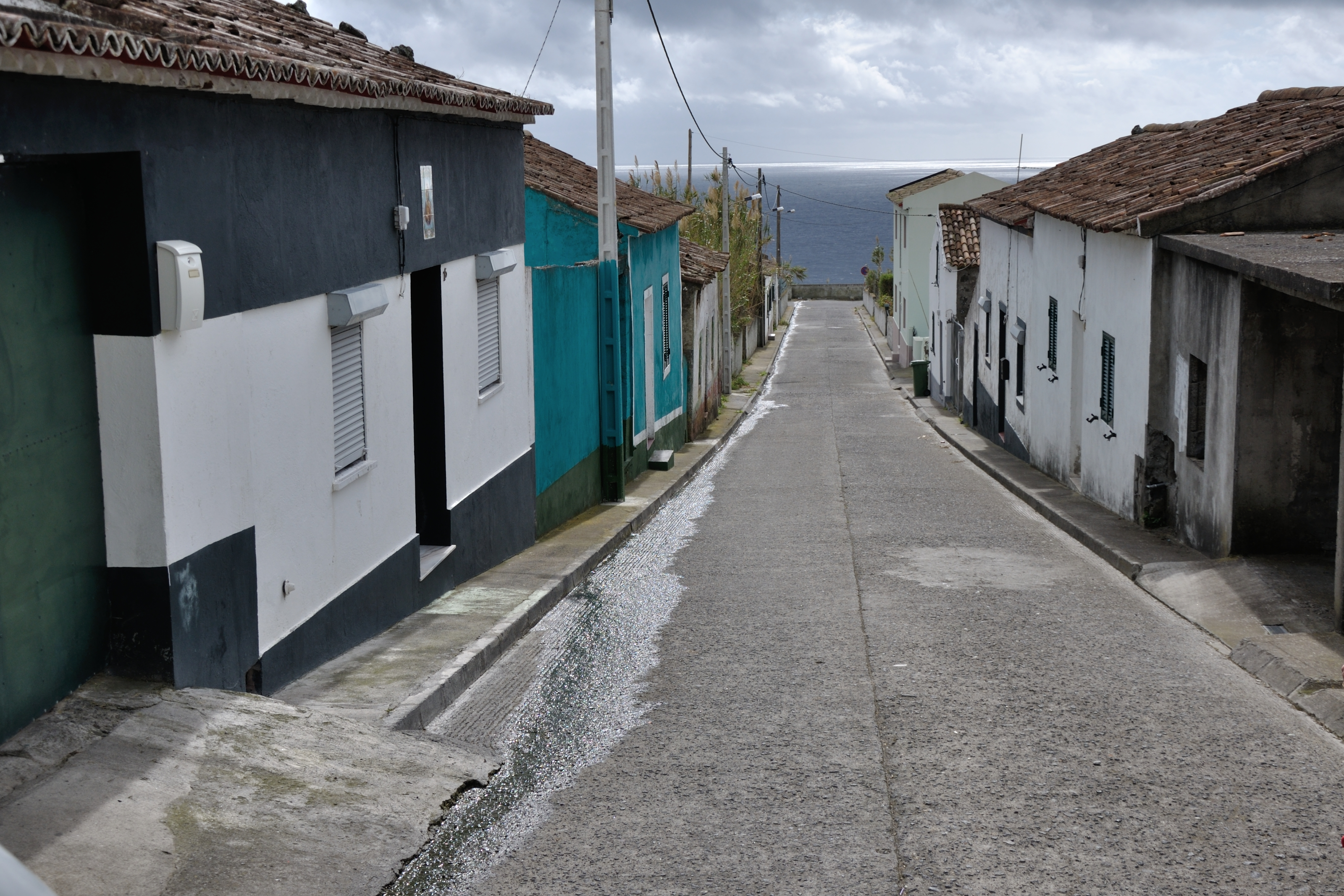
Some of the older homes along the southern tract of the village of Feteiras

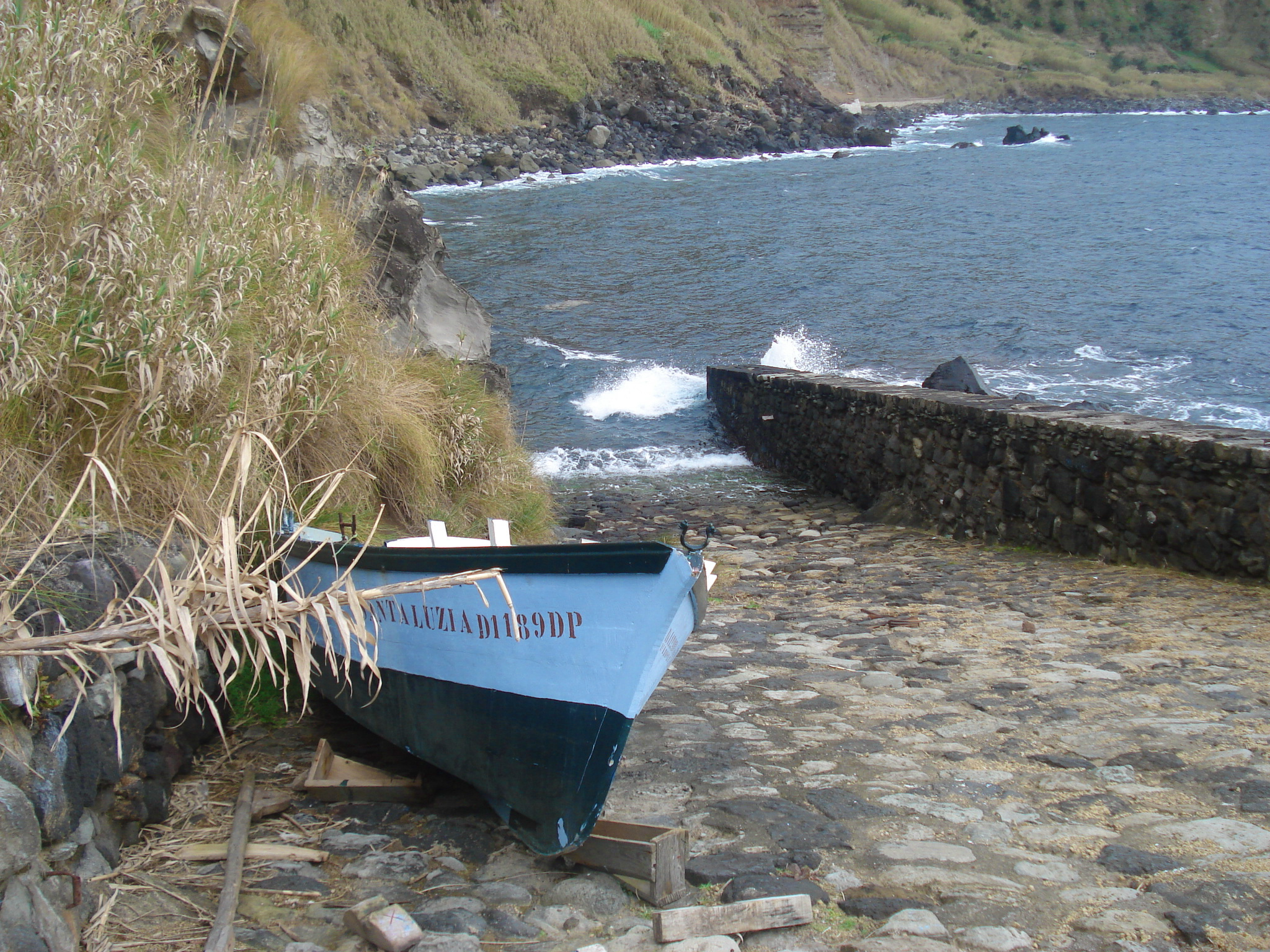
A view of the old artesnal fishing port of Feteiras

The majority of its residents are dedicated to agricultural activities and animal husbandry, including a factory that is linked to meat processing services (Salsiçor).

In addition, the site continues to be served by two small fishing ports, that supports small subsistence or artesnal fishing practices. At the eastern border, just after the lookout, is a winding dirt road that leads to the old port of Feteiras, while near the western edge of the parish (at the end of Canada do Porto) is the more recent entrepot and natural pool.

== Architecture ==
Situated in the centre of the more densely populated section of the town is a marble fountain, in the Largo de Santa Luzia. Consisting of four taps, oriented to the cardinal positions of the island, some believe that the structure was a regal gift from Lisbon, that was given to the community of Ponta Delgada (sometime in the 19th century), but which was later transferred to the community of Feteira.

== Culture ==
Festivities in celebrating the Santissmo Sacramento are celebrated on the first Sunday of September, while religious celebrations marking the patron saint occur in December, in addition to annual Holy Spirit rituals throughout the summer. The events of the Holy Spirit feasts include an ethnographic procession that includes oxe-driven carts, sharing of sweet bread and wine, the traditional crowning on Sunday and a competition celebrating the best recipes of Massa Sovada (traditional sweet bread). Also associated with the latent religious community is the annual Tradicional Churrasco de São Pedro (Traditional St. Peters Barbeque), an event that brings together the local population for music, children's events, and celebration of local gastronomy and drink.
