= João Afonso do Estreito =

Portuguese sailor and explorer

- Born: Funchal, Portuguese Empire
- Disappeared: 1487
- Occupation: Explorer

João Afonso do Estreito, from Funchal, Madeira, was a partner and co-captain in the Dulmo-Estreito expedition of 1487, a proposed pre-Columbian voyage of exploration across the Atlantic. Although licensed by King João II of Portugal, there is no evidence that the voyage ever took place.

Estreito partnered up with the Flemish Fernão Dulmo (Ferdinand Van Olm), and asked João II to approve their 40-day voyage to the fabled island Antillia, which the Portuguese called the Seven Cities. The King agreed to fund the exploration, under certain circumstances: Dulmo shall command the fleet to Antillia for the first forty days, and Estreito shall take over afterwards and be responsible for everything discovered until their return home. The Dulmo-Estreito voyage sparked an intense interest in later Portuguese westward voyages. Christopher Columbus had also proposed a similar journey to João II, yet his bargain was inferior to that of Dulmo. The king's rejection of Columbus left him to go to Spain in search of support for his proposed voyage.

== See also ==
- List of people who disappeared mysteriously at sea

== Sources ==
- Diffie, Bailey W.; Shafer, Boyd C.; Winius, George Davison (1977). Foundations of the Portuguese Empire, 1415-1580. Minneapolis, Minnesota: University of Minnesota Press. pp. 169–170. ISBN 0-8166-0782-6.
- "Christopher Columbus, Mariner". American Heritage. 7. 1955.
- Richman, Irving Berdine (1919). The Spanish Conquerors: A Chronicle of the Dawn of Empire Overseas. Yale University Press. ISBN 978-0-7222-6518-5.
