= Sete Cidades (Ponta Delgada) =

- Civil parish
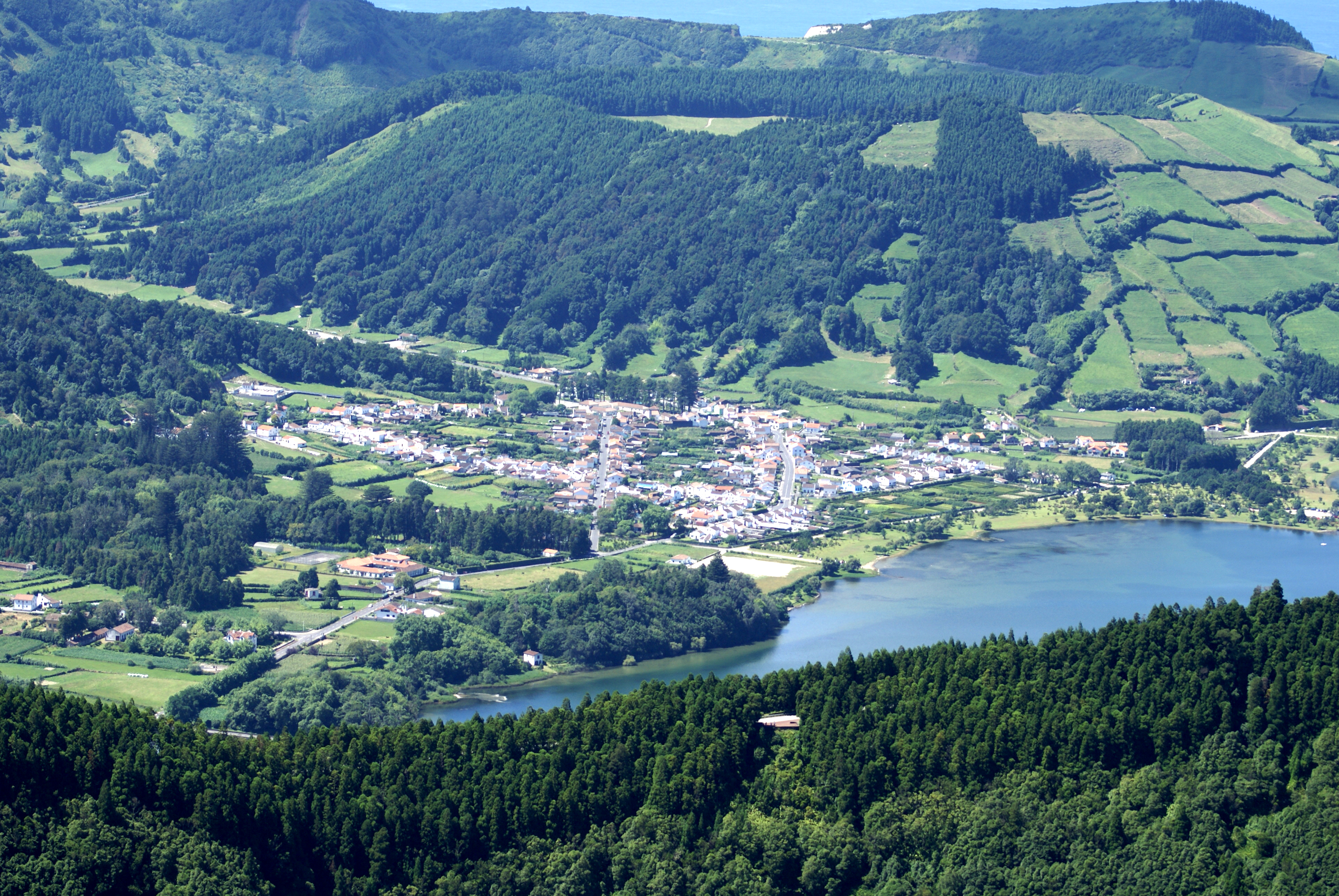
- The built-up settlement of Sete Cidades on the western margin of the Blue Lake

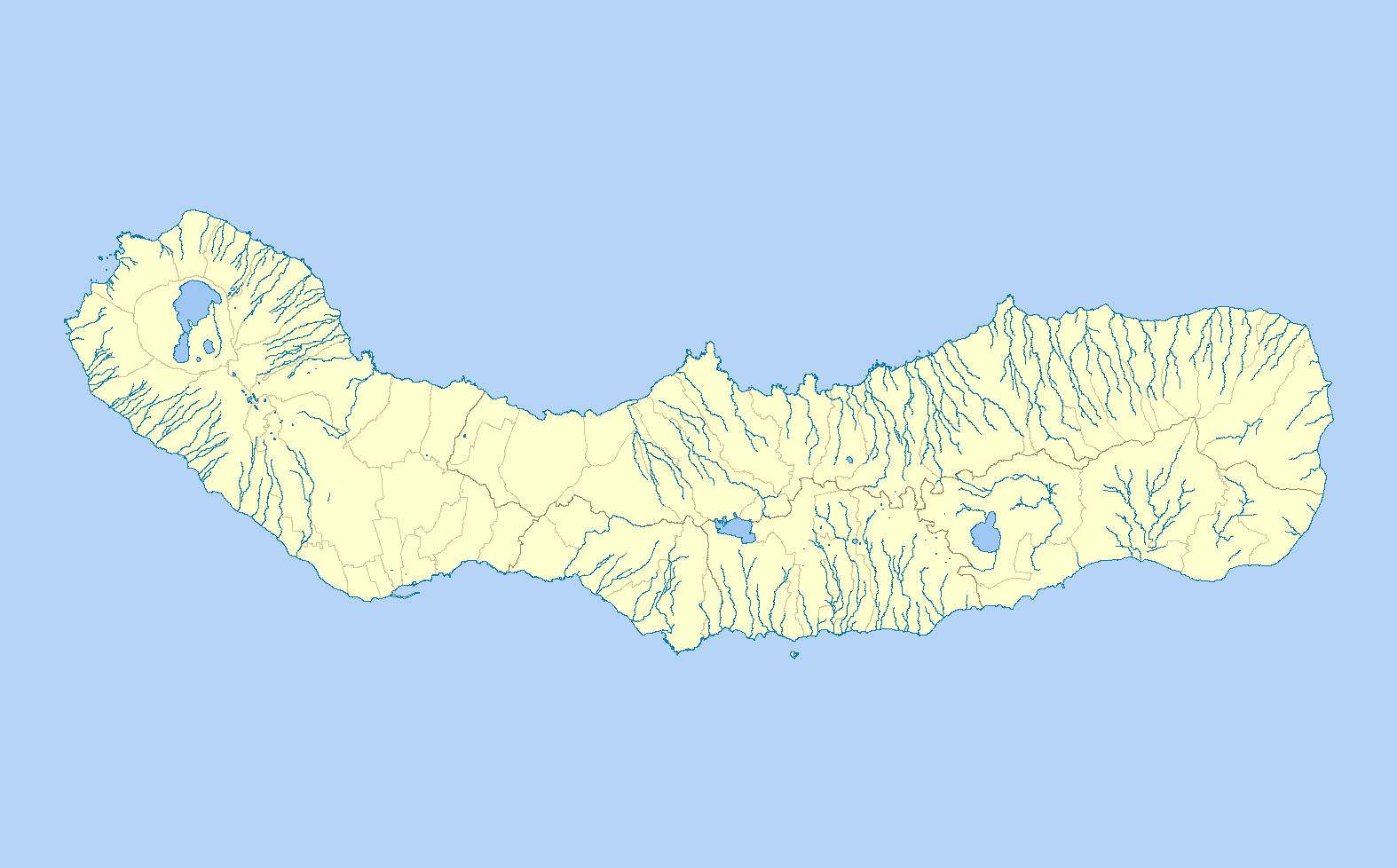
- Location in the Azores Sete Cidades (São Miguel)
- Coordinates: 37°51′42″N 25°47′38″W
- Country: Portugal
- Auton. region: Azores
- Island: São Miguel
- Municipality: Ponta Delgada

Area
  - Total: 19.19 km^{2} (7.41 sq mi)
- Elevation: 264 m (866 ft)

Population (2011)
  - Total: 793
  - Density: 41.3/km^{2} (107/sq mi)
- Time zone: UTC−01:00 (AZOT)
  - Summer (DST): UTC+00:00 (AZOST)
- Postal code: 9555-199
- Area code: 292
- Patron: São Nicolau

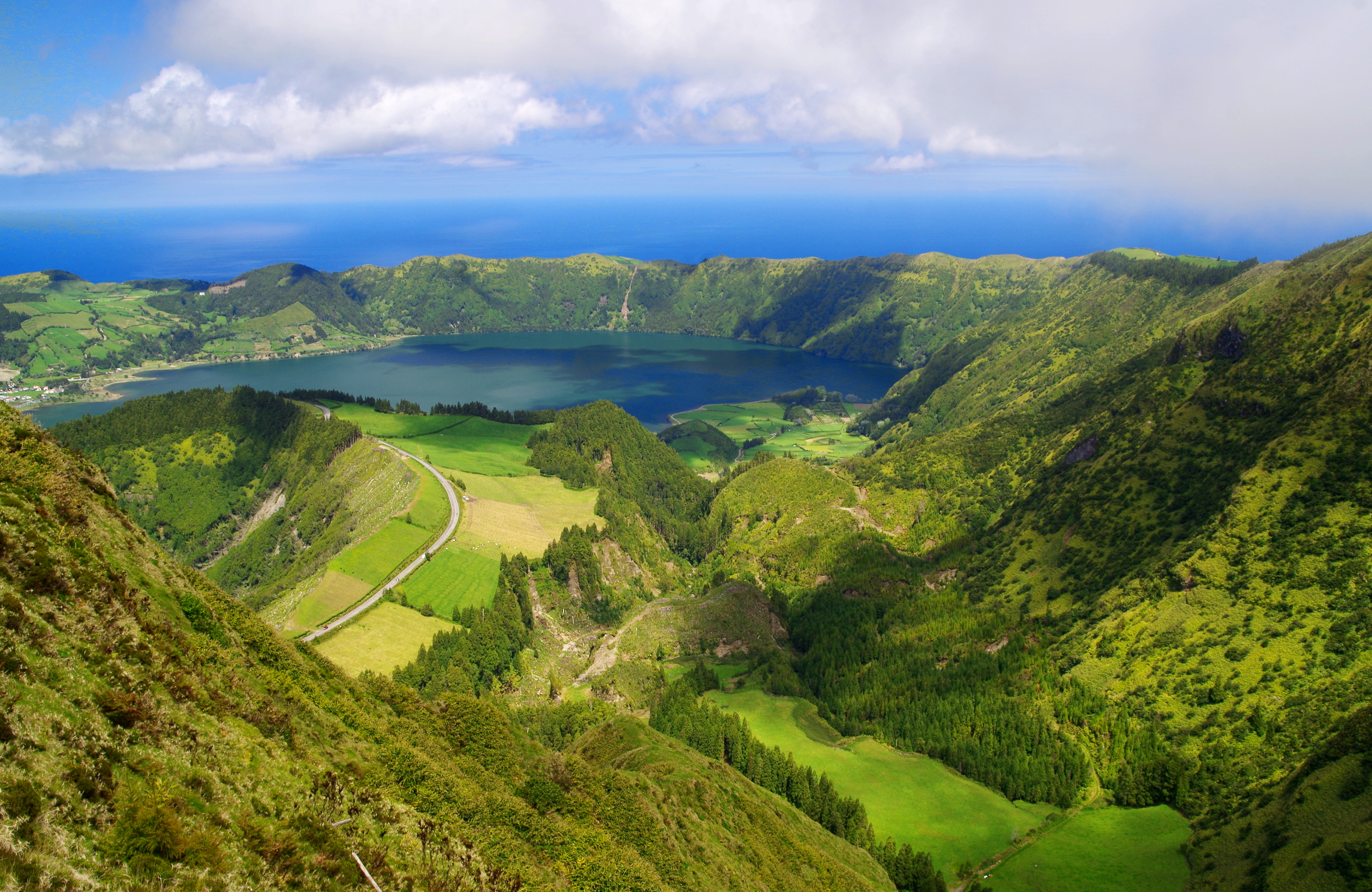
Sete Cidades Protected Landscape Area

Sete Cidades is a civil parish in the center of the municipality of Ponta Delgada, that is likewise located in the center of a massive volcanic crater five kilometres (3 mi) across, also referred to as Sete Cidades. The population in 2011 was 793, in an area of 19.19 km^{2}. It is one of the smallest parishes of Ponta Delgada by population, although the largest in area. It contains the localities Cerrado da Ladeira, Cerrado das Freiras and Sete Cidades.

== History ==
=== Latin origins ===
The region received its geographic nomenclature from the Latin Insula Septem Civitatum, which means "Island of the Seven Tribes" or "Island of the Seven Peoples" (Portuguese: Ilha das Sete Tribos or Ilha dos Sete Povos), but became a historical reference as the "Island of the Seven Cities". This comes from classical Latin, probably incorporated into the older traditions of Mediterranean peoples, through the navigators of European antiquity, or the Phoenicians. In Latin, civitas does not signify city, but rather a collectivity of citizens of a determined community.

The first Iberian document to refer to Sete Cidades was a Latin chronicle from the city of Porto-Cale (the modern city of Porto), written in 750 A.D. by a Christian cleric. During this era, the Iberian Kingdom of the Visigoths was in the process of collapse, under pressure from Muslim invasions (which began in 711 A.D.). The Visigoth archbishop fled to Porto-Cale, fearing the assault of the Muslim forces, where he deliberated an escape to the lands in the Western Sea, which sailors insisted existed. In 734, the archbishop, accompanied by six other bishops, their prelates and approximately 5000 faithful, sailed away in a fleet of twenty ships. The chronicle indicated that the fleet arrived at their destination, burned their ships and established seven Christian communities under the reign of the seven religious leaders. Although many prepared to follow, in truth, the archbishop (if he existed) was never heard from again, nor was the route to the mythical lands established.

Although there is no proof that the "island of Seven Cities" actually existed, the belief of their existence, some tentative expeditions and brief unconfirmed visual sightings of Atlantic islands, fostered legends during the European Middle Ages. Consequently, many of the Medieval maps and charts that showed the Ocean Sea (the Atlantic Ocean) identified an island (or islands) represented in different positions or forms. The island of Brasil and/or Antillia (from the Brendan context) and the island of Sete Cidades, were usual geographic references that persisted in the proto-geography of the Atlantic.

With the advent of the Age of Discovery, the visual references and number of voyages of discovery multiplied. One of the more consistent maps presented to King Afonso V of Portugal was from the Azorean, Fernão Teles (in 1473). This map showed a long coastline, with various islands, bays and rivers which the author declared were part of the fabled land of Sete Cidades. In reality, the map easily follows the northern coast of Brazil, between Maranhão and Ceará, with the Rio Parnaíba delta. The King, himself, was not totally convinced of the discovery, or did not consider Fernão Teles sufficiently creditable, and that the map only represented a reference that required proofs. Unhappy with the outcome, Teles insisted on the validity of Sete Cidades. He consulted a Genovese cosmographer Paolo del Pozzo Toscanelli (1398–1492), who declared that Antilla and the island of Sete Cidades existed along the margins of the Atlantic. In his famous letter, Toscanelli placed the mythical lands of Sete Cidades near the Azores:

"The island of Antillia was discovered by the Portuguese, and now when it is sought it is not found. In this island are people who speak the Spanish tongue, and who in the time of King Roderick are believed to have fled to this island from the barbarians who at the time invaded Spain. Here dwelt an archbishop with six other bishops, each of whom had its own particular city. Wherefore this island is called by many 'seven cities.' These people live most piously in the full enjoyment of all the riches of this time."

In 1476, the Teles's petition of royal authentication was accepted, but no expeditions were sent by the donatario.

Of the better documented expeditions, the Fleming Ferdinand van Olm (also known in Azorean history as Fernando de Ulmo or Fernão Dulmo) captained an expedition to rediscover the lost kingdoms of Sete Cidades. Ironically, Fernando de Ulmo was then married to one of the daughters of Fernão Teles and lived on one of the islands of the Azores when, in 1486, he received authorization from King João II of Portugal to begin his expedition. In partnership with Afonso do Estreito, a Madeirense, he organized his voyage, with the co-financing of the Royal Court, in order to conquer and subjugate the islands. Unfortunately, Fernão Dulmo did not have better luck, but ultimately, around the 17th Century, did organize an expedition to the northwest of Terceira, where an unknown island had been spotted.

=== Settlement ===
The colonization of Sete Cidades developed after the property owner, José Bettencourt, who was the principal benefactor of the lands within the crater, made tracts available for settlement. These lands were rented to farmers and other colleagues, who then cultivated the limited tracts and paid monthly stipends for their use. For a long time, this limited the number of inhabitants living within the caldera.

== Geography ==
=== Physical geography ===
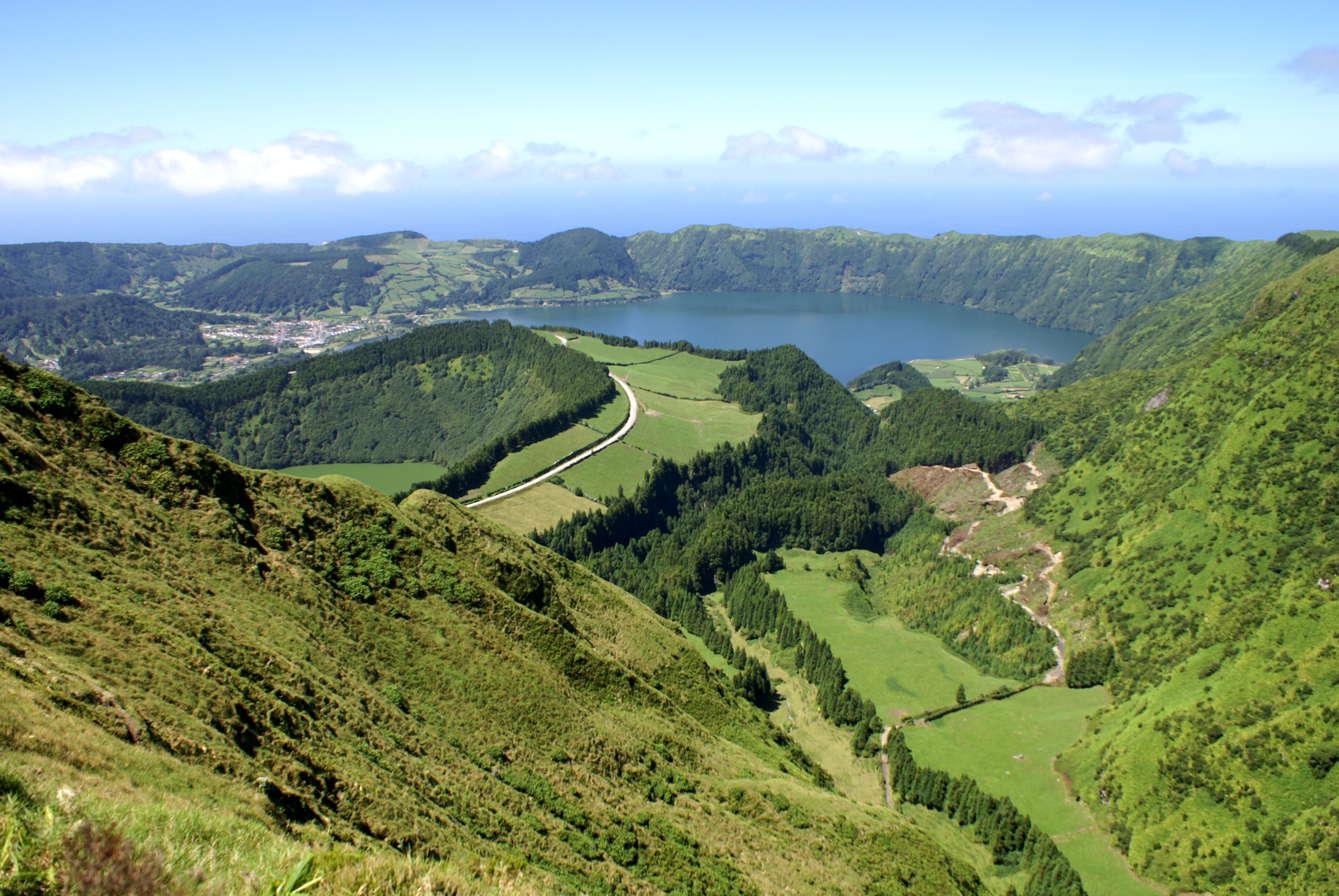
The setting of the village of Sete Cidades, as seen from the Boca do Inferno Belvedere, showing the crater lake Lagoa Azul and the tuff cone Lagoa do Santiago

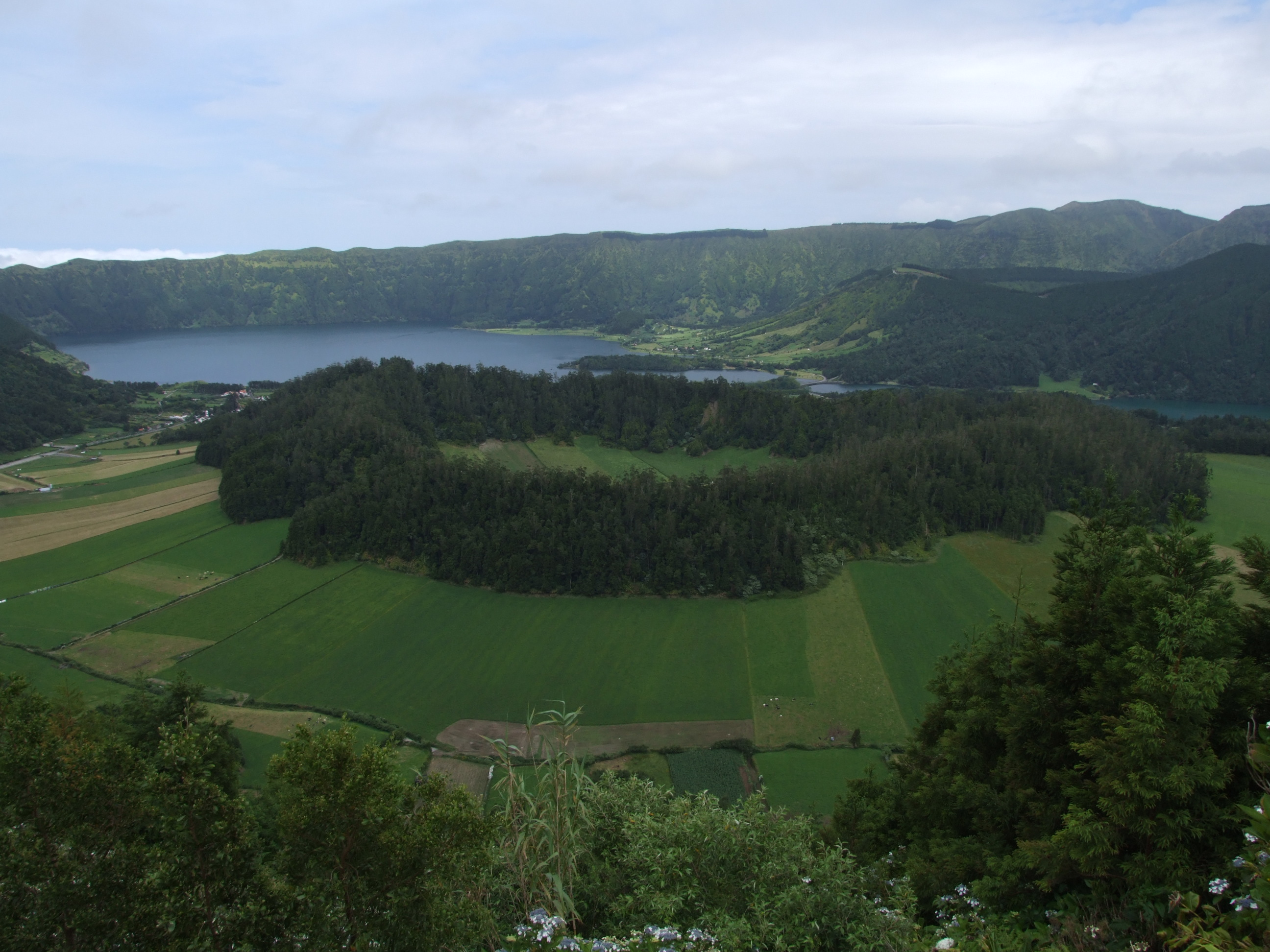
Caldeira Seca, one of the seven polygenetic cones formed during the 36,000 years of activity within the caldera

The Sete Cidades volcano is situated on the extreme western portion of the island of São Miguel occupying an area of approximately 110 square kilometres (42 mi^{2}) and refers to a polygenetic volcano (Sete Cidades Massif) and caldera. Its subaerial volume, of about 70 cubic kilometres (17 mi^{3}), has grown at an estimated rate of 0.02–0.03 cubic kilometres (0.0048–0.0072 mi^{3}) per century, beginning more than 210,000 years ago. Presently, the interior of the structure is occupied by diverse volcanic structures and four lakes. It is almost circular caldera (5 kilometres (3.1 mi) in diameter and up to 400 metres (1,300 ft) high walls) formed through three phases of eruptions. The last intra-calderan eruption occurred approximately 500 years A.D., resulting in the creation of the Caldeira Seca cone. At the base of the caldera, there exist six Holocene era pyroclastic cones. Further, a large group of pleistocene post-caldera trachytic lava domes, lava flows, and pyroclastic flow deposits have been discovered on the northwestern flanks of the massif.

The two crater lakes (Portuguese: Lagoas das Sete Cidades), 500 metres (1,600 ft) within the crater, are referred to by the color of the waters: blue, reflecting the sky (Portuguese: Lagoa Azul) and green, reflecting the ground (Portuguese: Lagoa Verde). According to legend, the differently colored lakes were created when a princess and her lover, a young shepherd, had to part from each other. The tears they shed at their farewell became the two lakes, with the water colored like their eyes.

=== Human geography ===
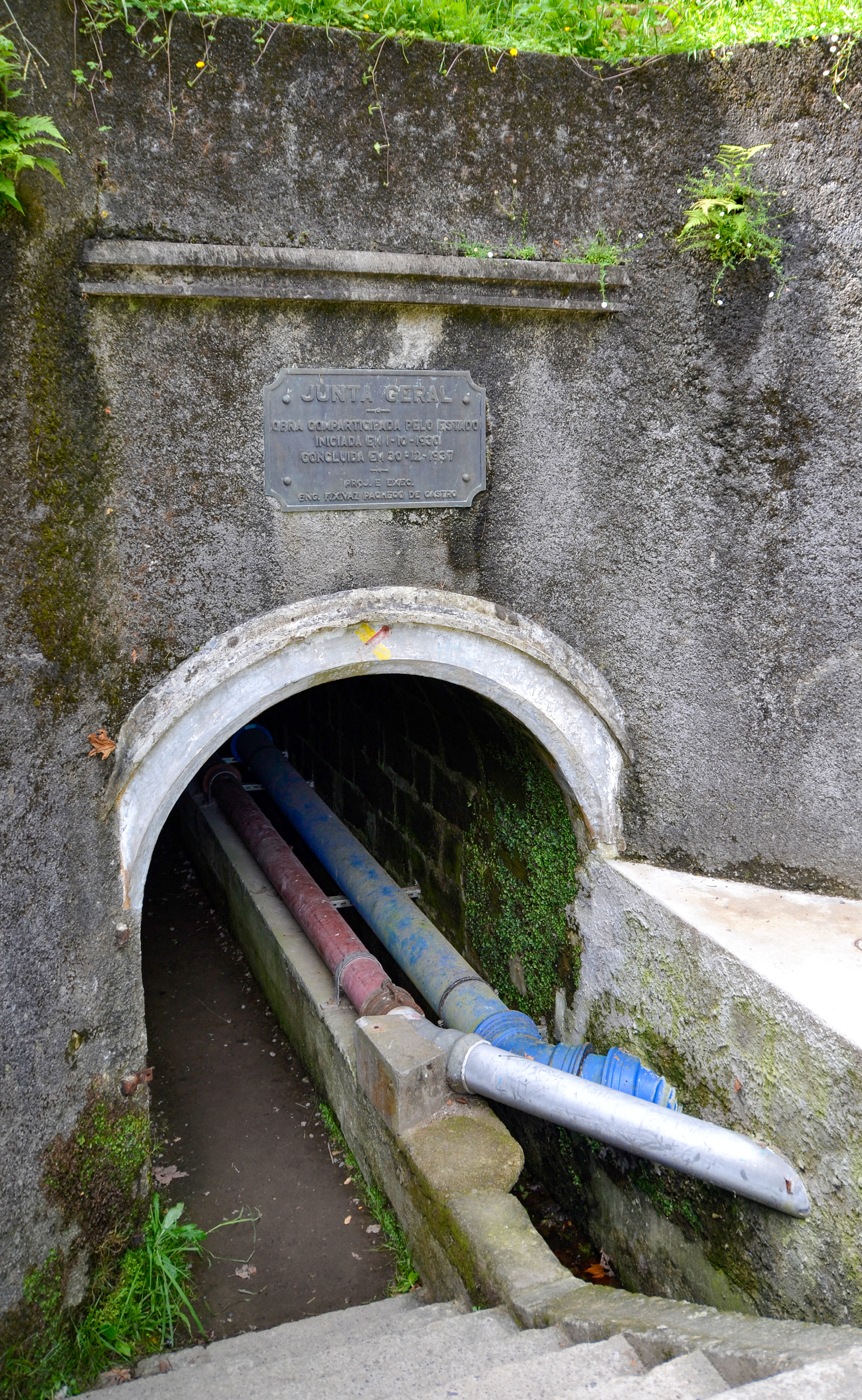
The southern entrance of the tunnel to Mosteiros

The urbanized portion of the parish, the village of Sete Cidades, is located in the southwest portion of the crater within the Cumierias da Bretanha and extends from the Blue Lake north to south. Farmland, mostly pastures, are located around the village, and confined to the portions south of the Blue Lake. The remainder of the crater is forested, although the southeastern portion also has some grasslands. A bridge at the junction of the two lakes provides the most direct road connection to Ponta Delgada. In the western end of the crater, in an area of open parklands, a 1.2 km tunnel containing water pipes and a footpath links the crater to the village of Mosteiros.

== Architecture ==
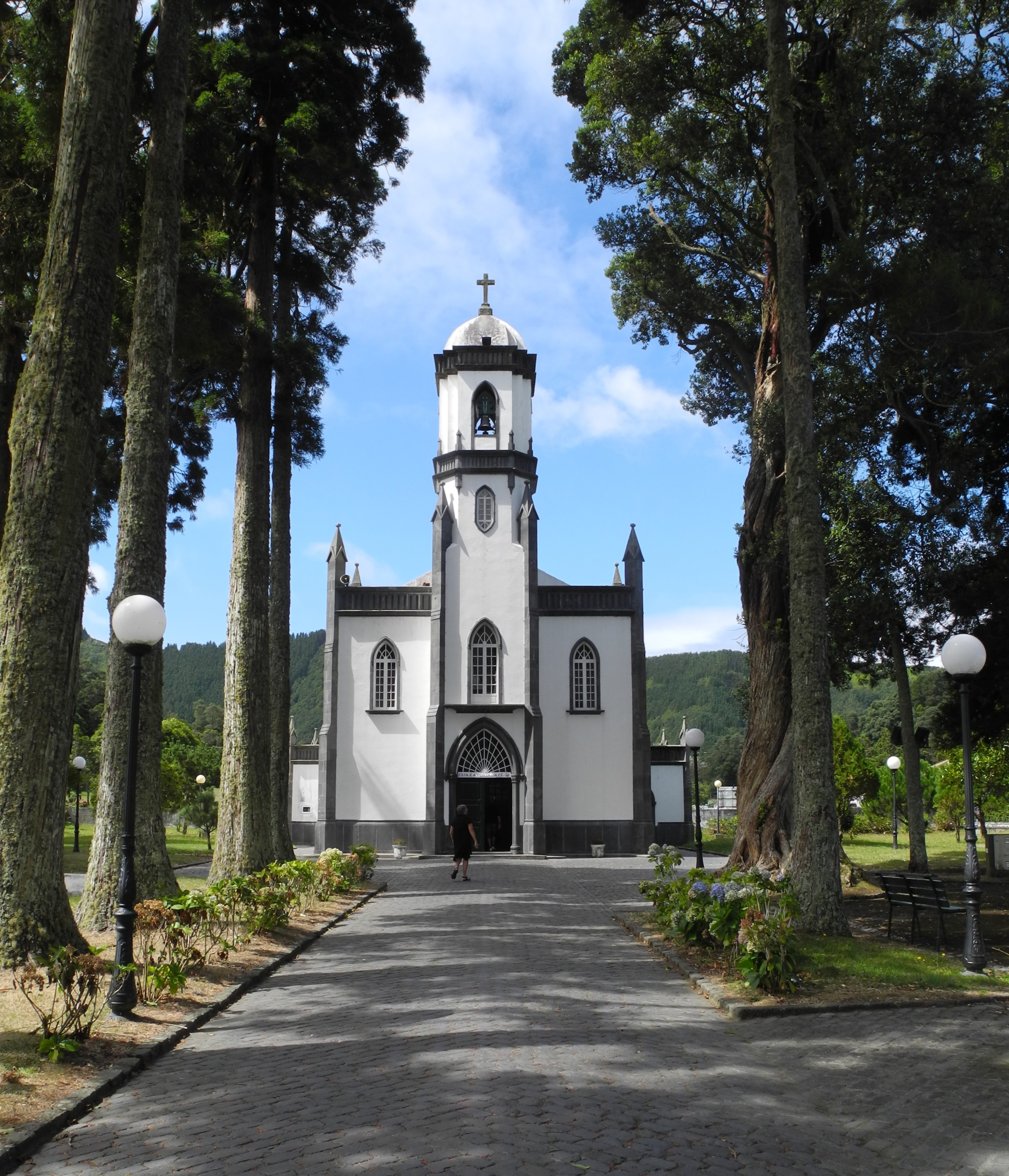
Front façade and alleyway to the Church of Saint Nicholas

The Church of Saint Nicholas is a Neo-Gothic church is oriented around a single-nave, rectangular plan consisting of a sacristy, chancel and annexes, with differentiated covering and illuminated by lateral Gothic windows. The main façade includes a single, central bell tower, with doorway and windows (also Gothic). The interior includes baptistery, triumphal arch and simple altar.

== See also ==
- List of volcanoes in Azores
