= Sete Cidades Massif =

Stratovolcanic complex

- Massif
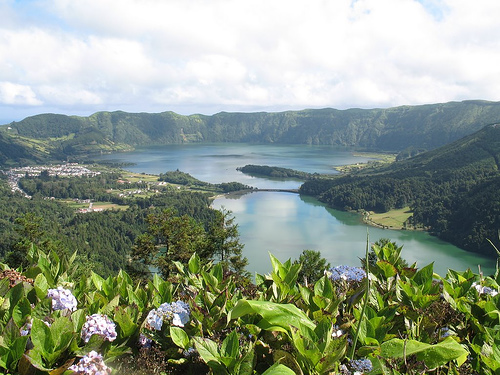
- The emblematic view of the Sete Cidades Massif is highlighted principally by the Lagoa das Sete Cidades crater lake

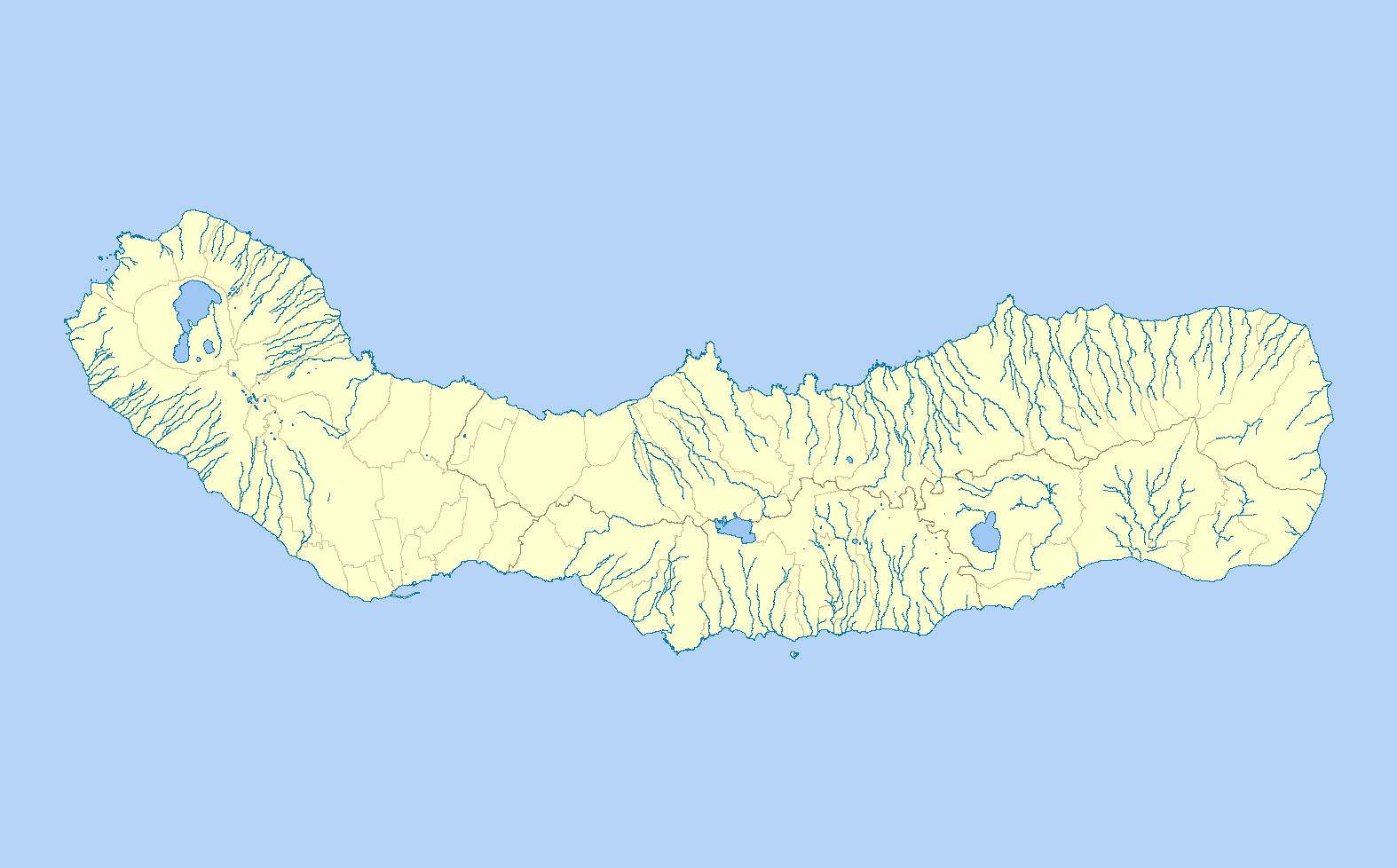
- Location of the Sete Cidades Massif on the island of São Miguel
- Coordinates: 37°52′11″N 25°46′48″W
- Location: Eastern Group, Azores, Portugal
- Geology: Alkali basalt

Sete Cidades Massif is a stratovolcanic complex, referring to a polygenetic volcano and caldera, located in western part of the island of São Miguel, in the Portuguese archipelago of the Azores. More recognizable for the Lagoa das Sete Cidades at its centre, the volcanic complex includes centuries of geomorphological structures that include lava domes, cones, lava flows and maar geomorphology that have marked its history.

== History ==
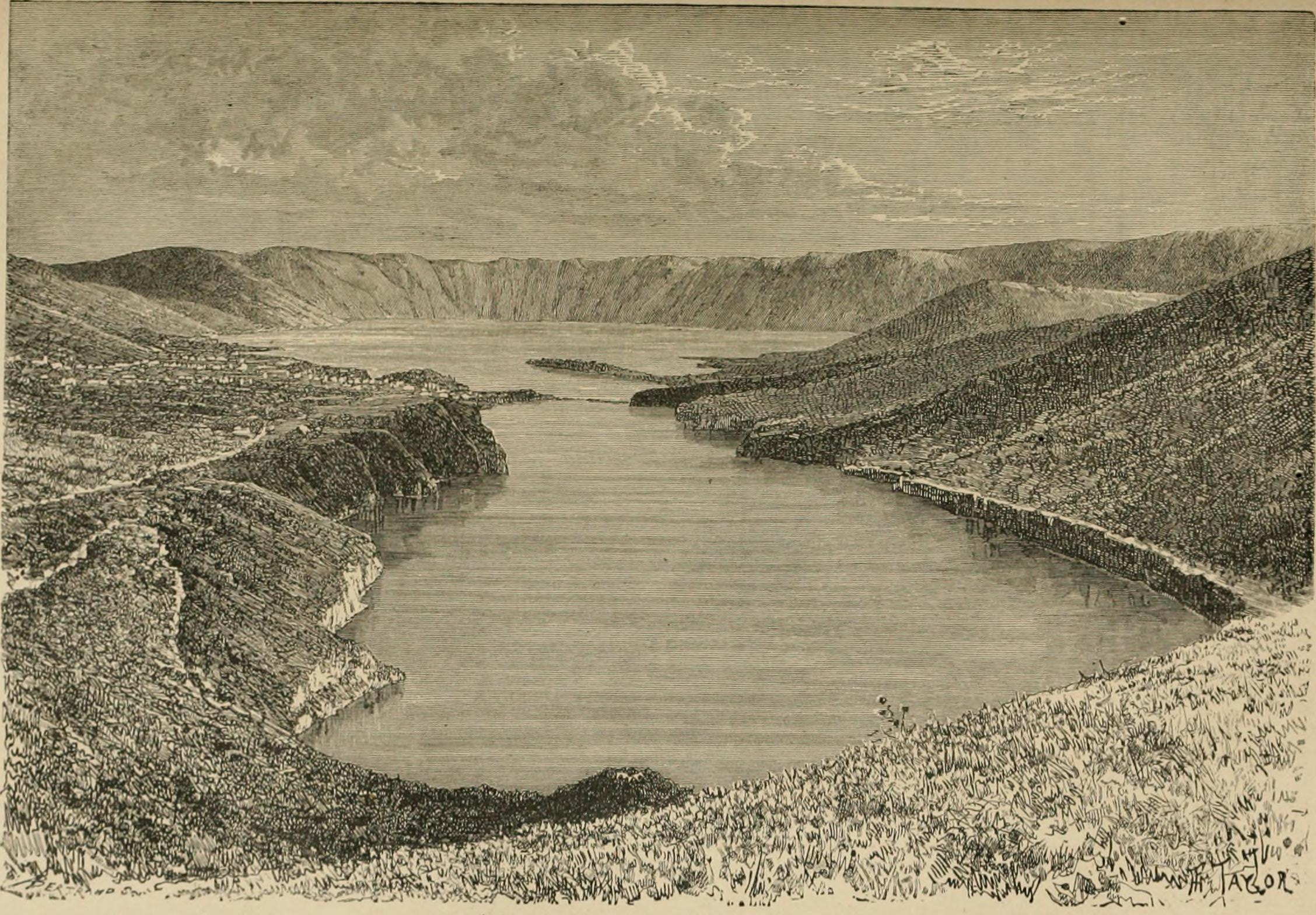
A historic rendering of the Sete Cidades Massif and crater lakes

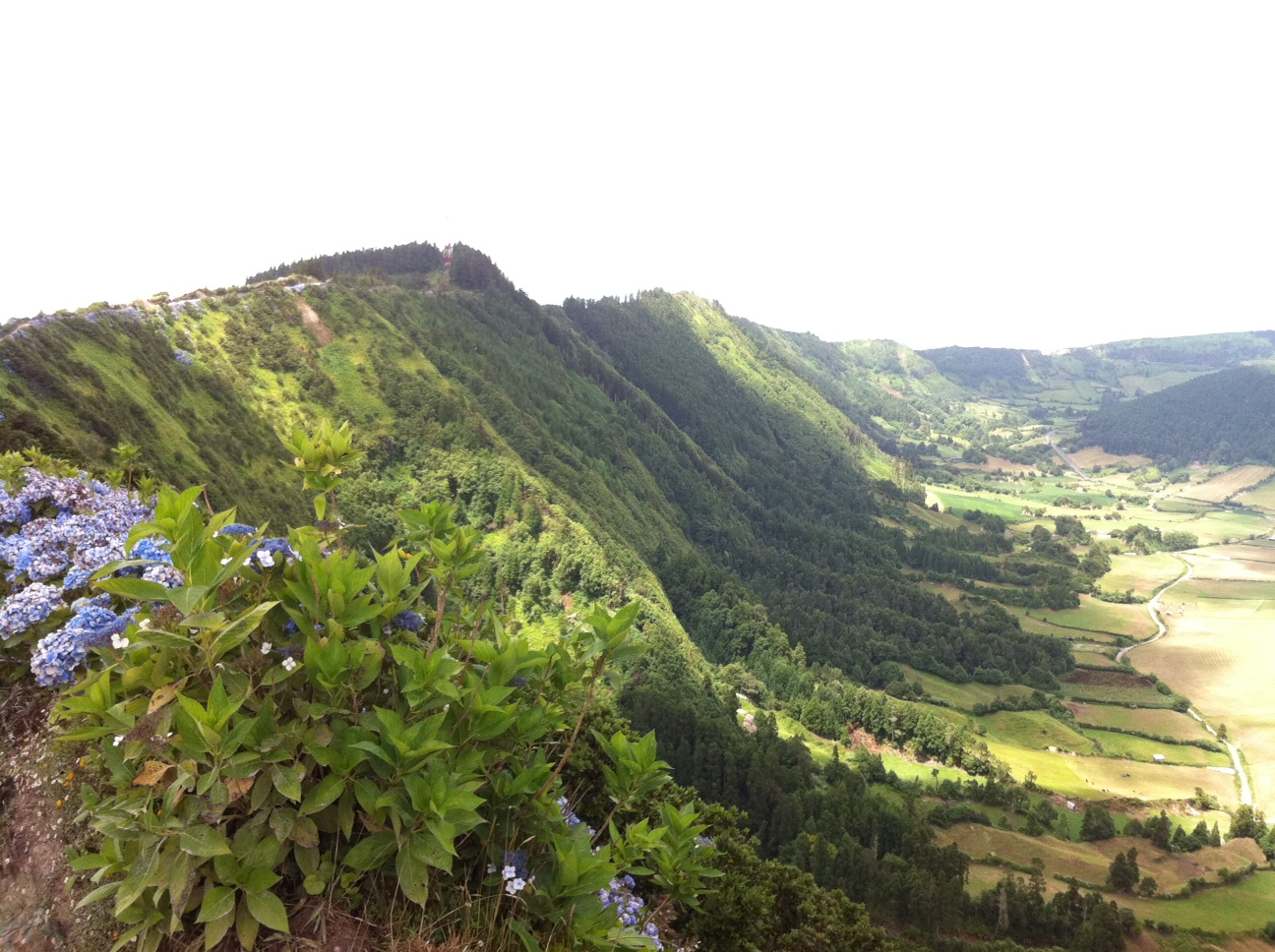
Lateral profile of the crater wall towards the western edge of the caldera

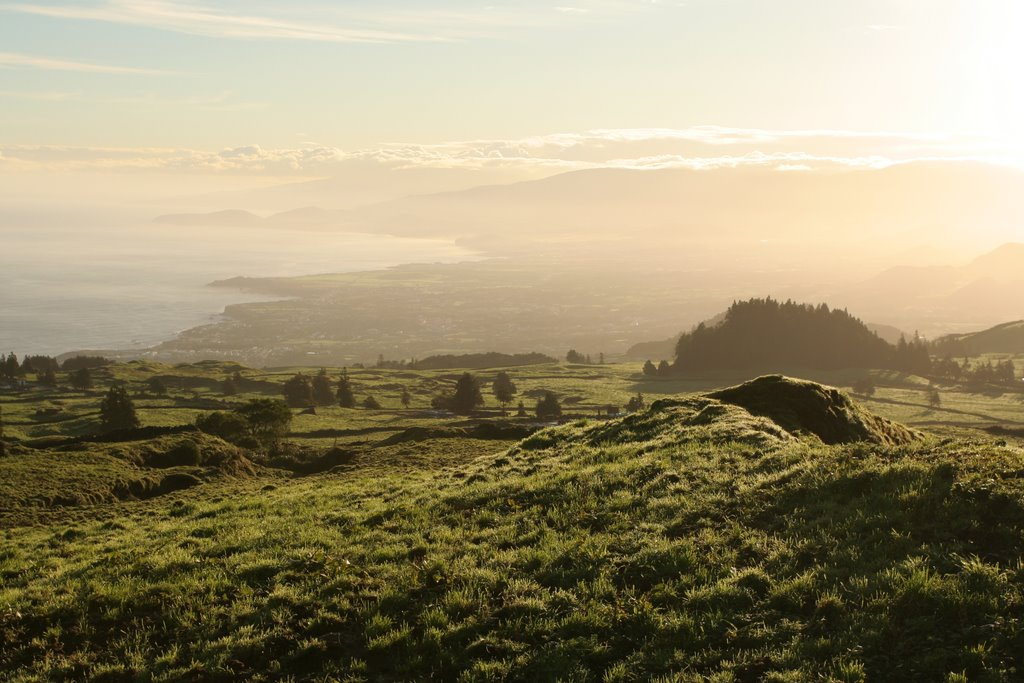
A view of the northeastern flanks of the Sete Cidades Massif, showing the small radial cones in Santo António

The almost circular caldera is a nested structure formed as a result of three separate caldera collapse episodes, each associated with explosive eruptions. These caldera collapse episodes occurred following explosive eruptions that formed the Risco, Bretanha and Santa Barbara pyroclastic fields.

The first phase occurred 35,700 years ago, and ceased with the collapse of the principal volcano. A secondary phase began around 28,750 years ago and was responsible for the collapse of the northwest portion of the primitive caldera. Around 15,740 years ago the last phase, marked by the collapse of the northern and northeastern portions of the crater occurred. In each of these formational phases, lapilli fallout (resulted from Plinian eruptions) and the pyroclastic flow deposits were transformed into ignimbrites, from melting.

The Sete Cidades Massif has experienced 17 intra-caldera eruptions within the last 5000 years, which makes it the most active in the archipelago. The intra-calderan activity has been essentially marked by trachyte sub-Plinian and Plinian eruptions, with some having hydromagmatic characteristics. These formations date to 35,700 B.C., 28,750 B.C. and 15,740 B.C. Numerous smaller explosive eruptions then occurred between these paroxysmal events. In the last 5000 years, 17 explosive eruptions took place within the Sete Cidades volcano, resulting in fallout and hydromagmatic eruptions. Location of these eruptions vary, but they generally took on a southerly dispersal. Yet, there is geological evidence for pyroclastic density currents associated with three or four explosive events, but high concentrations of pyroclastic flows are sparse. It may be likely that:

- any pyroclastic flows were confined to channels and only deposited locally in depressions; and
- these deposits were quickly eroded away.

The last intra-caldera eruption occurred approximately 500 years A.D., resulting in the creation of the Caldeira Seca cone. At the base of the caldera, there exist six Holocene era pyroclastic cones. Further, a large group of Pleistocene post-caldera trachytic lava domes, lava flows, and pyroclastic-flow deposits have been discovered on the northwestern flanks of the massif.

Along historical eruptions have generally been basaltic in quality, with effusive characteristics that were less explosive, but generally Hawaiian or Strombolian in nature, occurring along the flanks of the crater and conditioned by regional and radial faults. Unlike Furnas, Sete Cidades has no active fumaroles, and most secondary manifestations occur in the submarine vents off the coast of Ponta da Ferraria and the coast of Mosteiros, as well as zones of natural degasification.

The most recent historical eruption dates back to the 15th century; Sete Cidades has not erupted historically, although an eruption may have occurred immediately prior to the island's first colonisation, associated with a rift zone immediately southeast of the Sete Cidades Massif. Other eruptions have occurred within the caldera and from submarine vents along the western coast of the island; there have been four Strombolian eruptions and three Surtseyan eruptions in occupied history within a short distance of the shoreline.

== Geography ==
The Sete Cidades Massif occupies the northwestern portion of the island and corresponds to a circular central caldera 6 by 5 kilometres (3.7 mi × 3.1 mi), whose interior is occupied by various lakes and volcanic cones of pumice, lava domes and maars. The depth of the caldera varies between 200 metres (660 ft) in the west to 500 metres (1,600 ft) in the east, although this varies at about 300 metres (980 ft) median. Regional tectonics influence the geomorphological forms in this region, as does a rift zone characterized by abundant scoria cones extending to the southeast from the caldera. This rift zone is uncharacteristically 200 metres (660 ft) higher than the crater rim, that it could shield Ponta Delgada from all but pyrcolastic flows associated with any future eruption. The northwestern flank is marked by the Mosteiros Graben, a tectonic structure aligned in a northwest to southeast orientation following the fault of the Terceira Rift zone. These faults and regional fractures have given way to radial faults resulting in scoria cones and lava domes throughout the serra.

The volcano of Sete Cidades is distinguished by two stratigraphic layers:

- The inferior group includes the oldest deposits associated with subaerial eruptions occurring more than 200,000 years B.C. This period of activity was essentially effusive producing basalt lava flows of trachyte.
- The superior layer includes the eruptive products of eruptions occurring 36,000 years B.C., resulting in the first formation of the primary monogenic cone. This group is marked by six formative phases resulting from explosive debris of trachyte materials, including pyroclastic bombs and flows, some resulting from hydromagmatic forces.
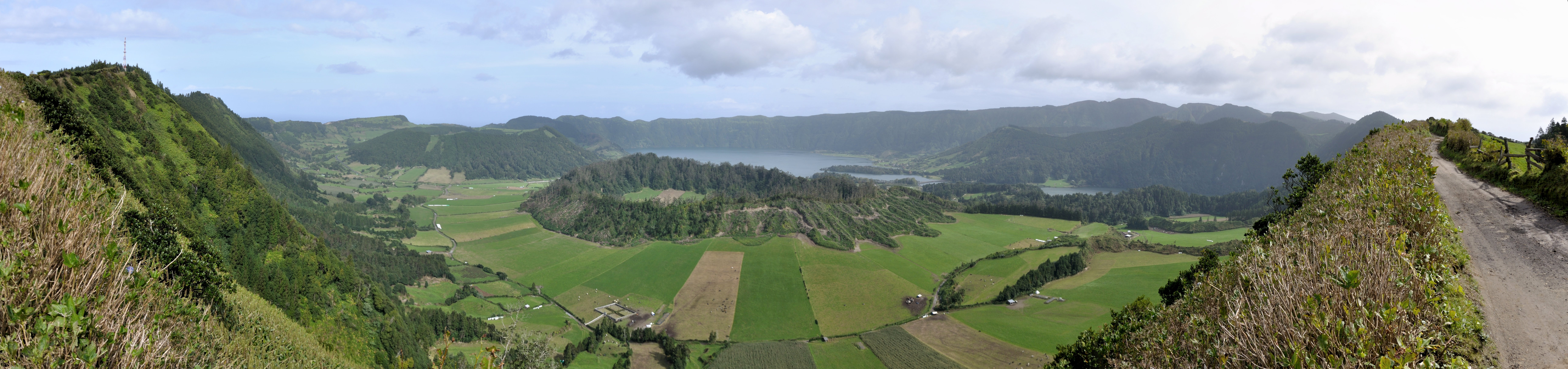
A view of the caldera as seen from the Cumeeiras, with the Caldeira Seca cone
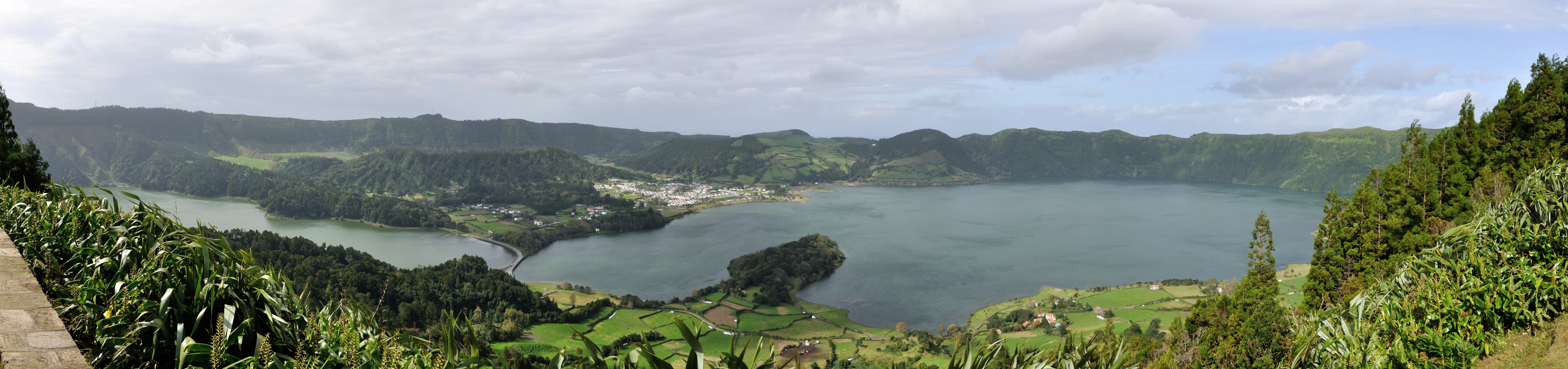
An alternative view of the caldera, showing the twin lakes of the Lagoa das Sete Cidades
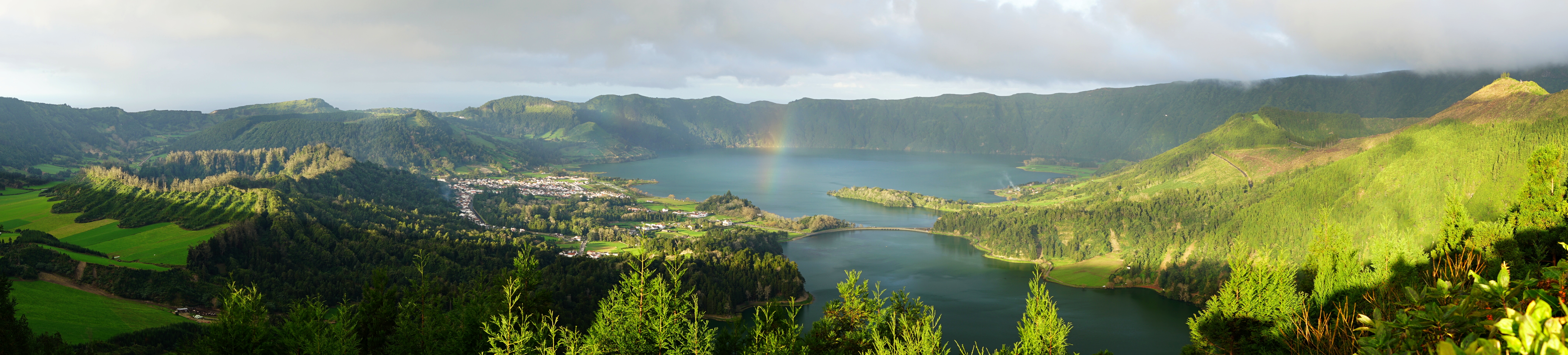
A view of Sete Cidades caldera from Vista do Rei viewpoint.
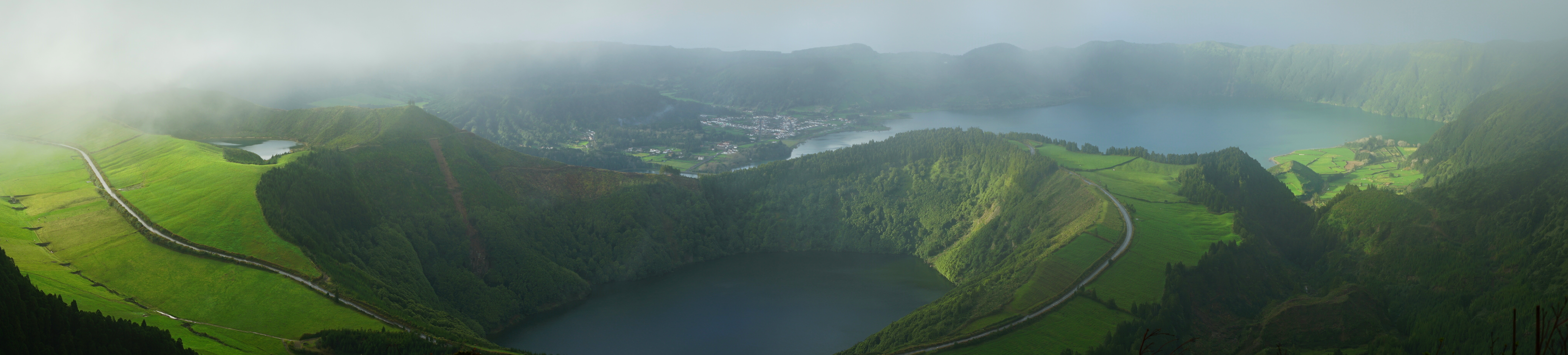
Lagoa de Santiago from Boca do Inferno viewpoint.
