= Relva =

- Civil parish
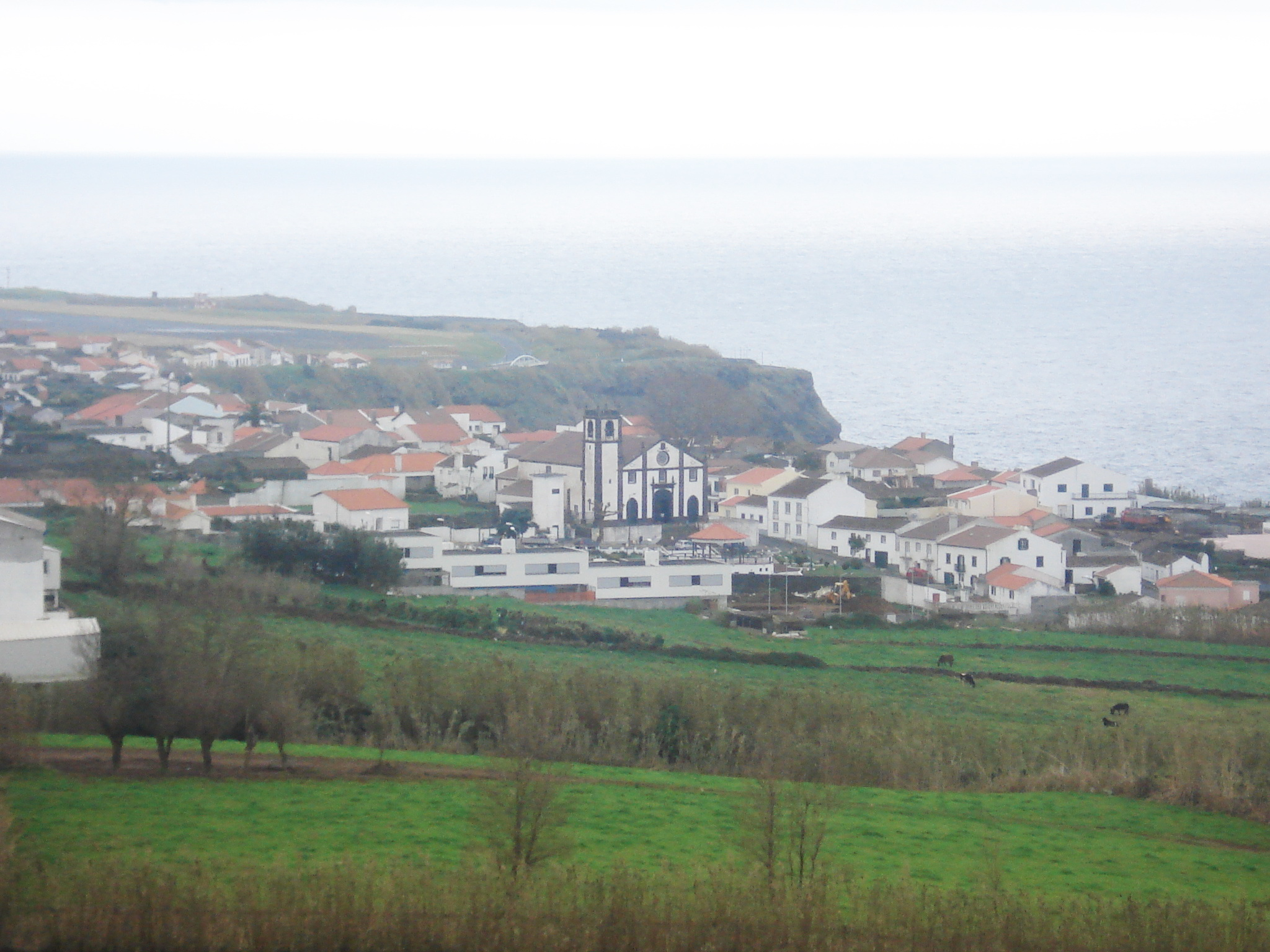
- The parish of Relva, at the end of the International Airport, with the church of Nossa Senhora dos Neves

- The location of the civil parish of Relva in the municipality of Ponta Delgada
- Coordinates: 37°45′14″N 25°43′14″W
- Country: Portugal
- Auton. region: Azores
- Island: São Miguel
- Municipality: Ponta Delgada

Area
  - Total: 12.07 km^{2} (4.66 sq mi)
- Elevation: 101 m (331 ft)

Population (2011)
  - Total: 3,006
  - Density: 249.0/km^{2} (645.0/sq mi)
- Time zone: UTC−01:00 (AZOT)
  - Summer (DST): UTC+00:00 (AZOST)
- Postal code: 9500-651
- Area code: 296
- Patron: Nossa Senhora dos Neves
- Website: http://www.jfrelva.com

Relva is a civil parish in the municipality of Ponta Delgada in the Portuguese archipelago of the Azores. The population in 2011 was 3,006, in an area of 12.07 square kilometres (4.66 mi^{2}). It contains the localities Nordela and Relva.

== History ==
The area of Relva was pristine forest and unoccupied grasslands, virgin fields, where the first explorers discovered forests of laurel, common holly, Portuguese laurel and Juniperus brevifolia, interspersed by local Vaccinium. The region, which extends to the border with Santa Clara and Feteiras, became a place where the pigs sent ashore by the first settlers congregated, and where many of nobles of Vila Franca do Campo hunted. Travelling by boat to the shore Santa Clara, these hunters would disembark and spend several days hunting for the semi-feral pigs, then returned to the settlements with their prizes. Slowly, the region began to be occupied by the first families, houses, fields and estates, developing the community of Ponta Delgada, and encroaching on the unspoiled lands to the west.

As Gaspar Frutuoso wrote:

"...the locality of Relva, obtained its name, because in the olden times there existed this good weed, and there it used to be called commonly Relva; and the residents of the city ordered send to this part, in that field, their cattle, because that they thought was good food for them, telling their children and shepherds that brought their bulls to Relva, now its courtyard."

Eventually, farmers began to graze their herds in the region where they encountered lands with thick grasses: relva, the Portuguese word for grass, as the region became known, was used to describe this place, because this settlers found plenty of this boa erva (Portuguese: good weed). The first settlers, where likely farmers and shepherds, integrally linked to the land, although no records identify the peoples.

The locality of Relva became more of a reality as settlers concentrated around the estates of Martim Vaz, a celebrated nobleman and local receiver (who collected the rents from the local serfs). Vaz was relatively important, since his name was attached to improvements made to the local fountain (which was near the sea), an important landowner and for his construction of the first temple in the parish, dedicated to Nossa Senhora das Neves. His role in the parish is reflected in the local toponymy: the church was once referred to as the Igreja do Contador da Relva (Church of the Receiver of Relva), the fountain that he repaired the Fonte do Contador and a local grotto, the Grota do Contador, who were named in respect for Martim Vaz.

== Geography ==
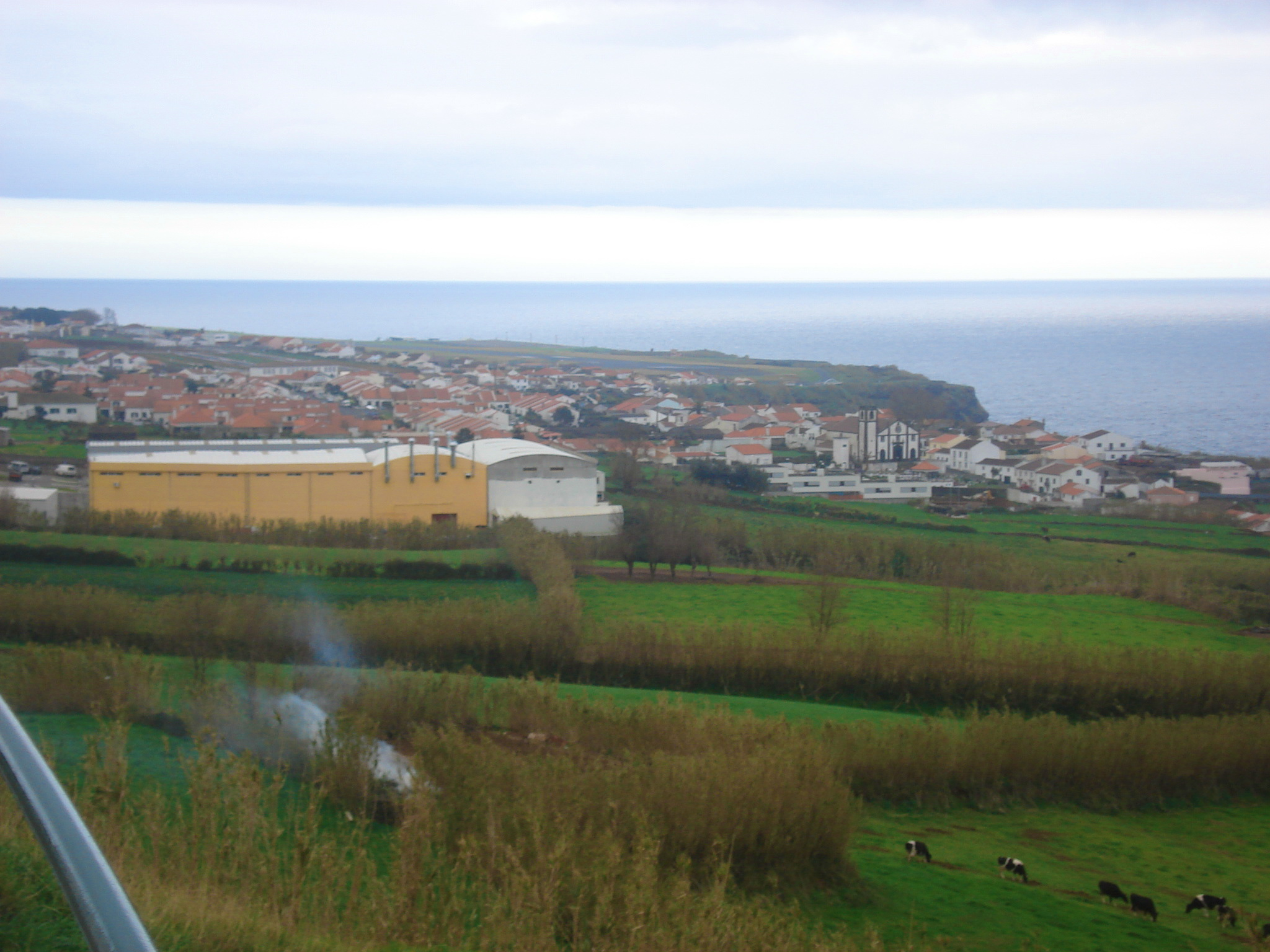
A view of the civil parish of Relva, showing centre, airport and rural areas

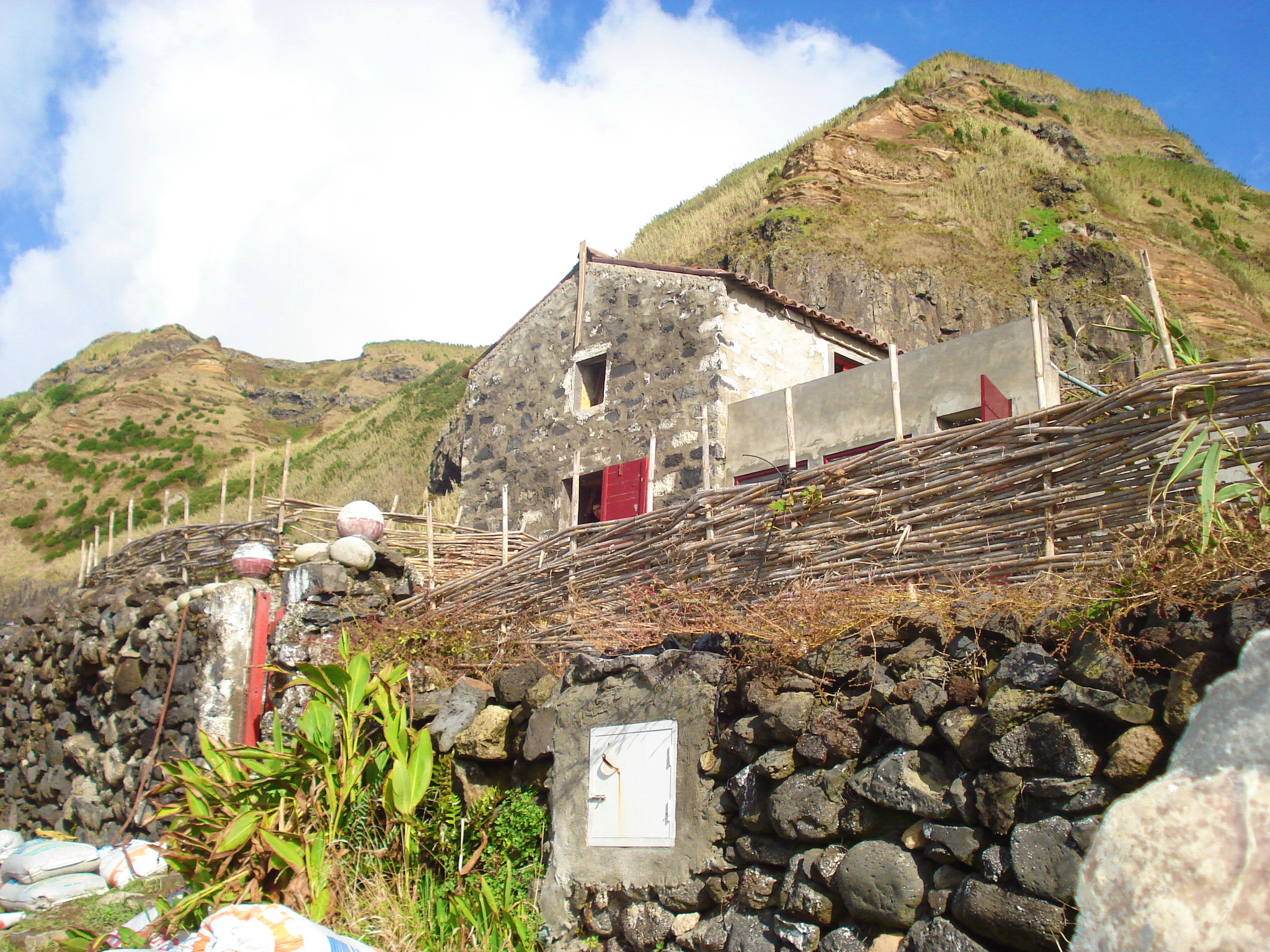
Summer cottages along the coastal village of Rocha da Relva, in the shadow of the airport

Relva is situated on the southern coast of São Miguel, surrounded by Arrifes, Covoada and Capelas (in the north) and the Atlantic Ocean (along the south).

== Culture ==
The actual parochial church celebrates a festival in honour of Our Lady of the Snows on the first Sunday of August.
