= Covoada =

- Civil parish
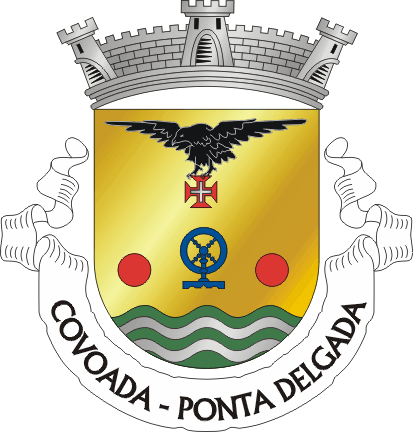
- Coat of arms

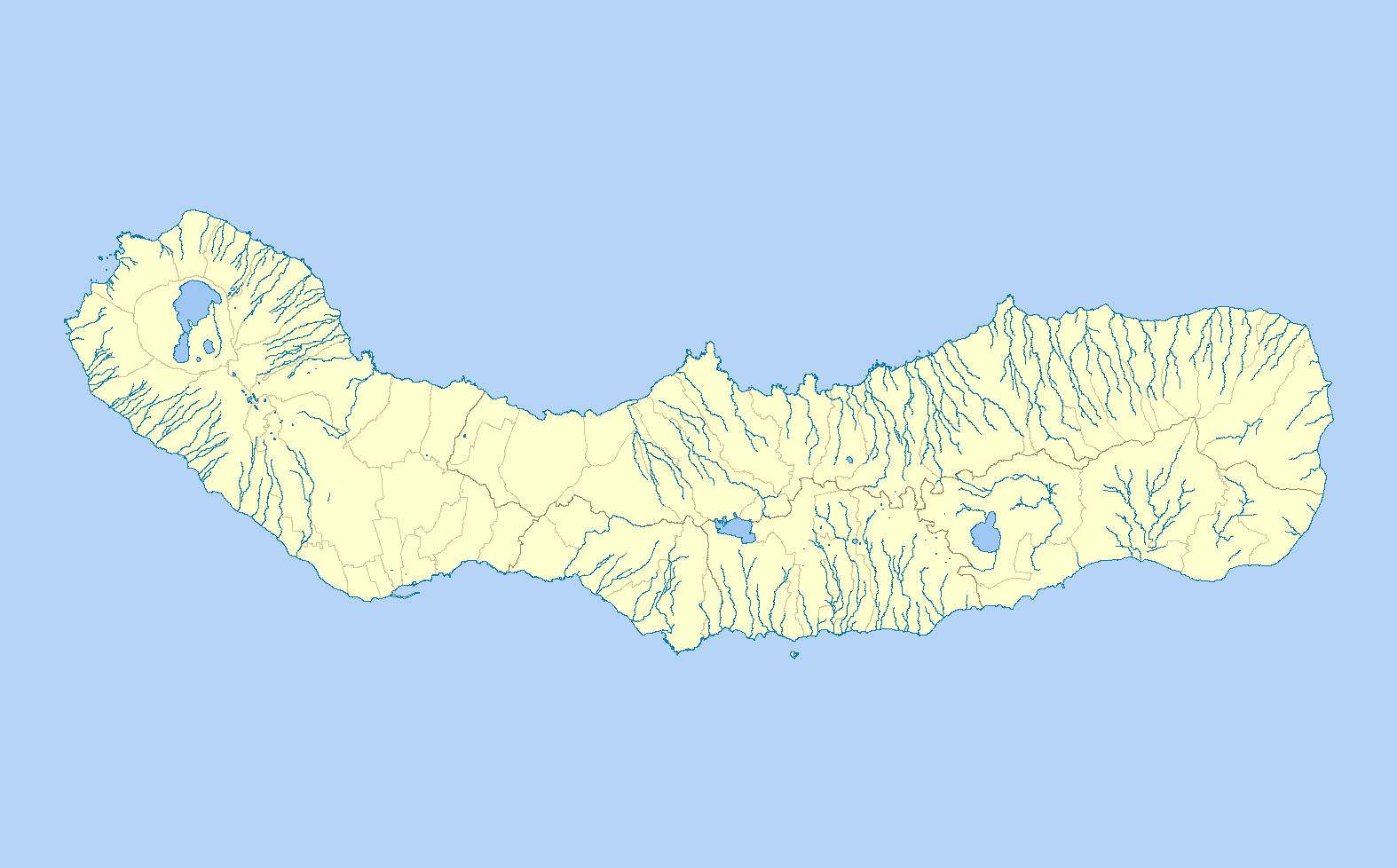
- Location in the Azores Covoada (São Miguel)
- Coordinates: 37°47′29″N 25°43′48″W
- Country: Portugal
- Auton. region: Azores
- Island: São Miguel
- Municipality: Ponta Delgada

Area
  - Total: 9.03 km^{2} (3.49 sq mi)
- Elevation: 334 m (1,096 ft)

Population (2011)
  - Total: 1,341
  - Density: 150/km^{2} (380/sq mi)
- Time zone: UTC−01:00 (AZOT)
  - Summer (DST): UTC+00:00 (AZOST)
- Postal code: 9500-406
- Area code: 292
- Patron: Nossa Senhora da Ajuda

Covoada is a civil parish in the municipality of Ponta Delgada, on the island of São Miguel in the Azores. The population in 2011 was 1,341, in an area of 9.03 km^{2}. It contains the localities Covoada, Nossa Senhora da Graça and Pavões.

== History ==
The parochial church, Nossa Senhora da Ajuda, dates back to the construction of a chapel in the 16th century by Captain Gaspar de Medeiros the Older (its cupola was paid for by the Santa Casa de Misercórdia of Ponta Delgada).

During the early settlement of São Miguel, from about 1846, this area pertained to the parish of Arrifes, passing to the territory of Relva later, until its numbers warranted the creation of a new entity.

On March 2, 1958, the chapel of Nossa Senhora da Ajuda was destroyed in a violent fire; its retable and the image of Nossa Senhora da Ajuda were lost. In ashes of the temple, the residents were able to save a few books and documents, and an image of the Virgin Mary that was located in the baptistery. This image was transferred to the Seminary of Sr. Santo Cristo, in Ponta Delgada, where it today remains. During the reconstruction of the new church, in the latter part of the 20th century, the temple received a new bell tower. The Livro de Tombo from the Church of Nossa Senhora da Ajuda indicated the necessity to provide an independent religious parish to the faith community on October 28, 1977.

It was de-annexed from Relva on September 15, 1980, under Regional Decree 24/80/A.

== Geography ==
Covoada is a slender tract of land between the parishes of Relva and Arrifes that includes prime agricultural and pasturelands, interspersed with mountainous terrains covered in partial forest and scrub-brush. It is limited to an area from Capelas (in the north) to Relva and Arrifes (in the southwest and southeast respectively), and includes basin of the Serra Devassa, that includes Pico do Paúl, Pico Amêndoa, Pico Rochão, Pico das Maias and the Ladeira do Ledo. The available land has allowed the development of agriculture; cattle and dairy farming are the primary industrial sectors.
