= Pilar da Bretanha =

- Civil parish
- The location of the civil parish of Pilar da Bretanha, within the municipality of Ponta Delgada
- Coordinates: 37°53′35″N 25°47′0″W
- Country: Portugal
- Auton. region: Azores
- Island: São Miguel
- Municipality: Ponta Delgada
- Established: Settlement: fl.1500 Parish: 10 July 2002

Area
  - Total: 6.07 km^{2} (2.34 sq mi)
- Elevation: 222 m (728 ft)

Population (2011)
  - Total: 624
  - Density: 100/km^{2} (270/sq mi)
- Time zone: UTC−01:00 (AZOT)
  - Summer (DST): UTC+00:00 (AZOST)
- Postal code: 9545-068
- Area code: 292
- Patron: Nossa Senhora do Pilar

Pilar da Bretanha is a civil parish in the municipality of Ponta Delgada on the island of São Miguel, in the Portuguese archipelago of the Azores. It was de-annexed from the historical parish of Bretanha on 10 July 2002, along with Ajuda da Bretanha. The population in 2011 was 624, in an area of 6.07 square kilometres (2.34 sq mi). It contains the localities Casa Telhada, Covas, João Bom and Pilar.

== History ==
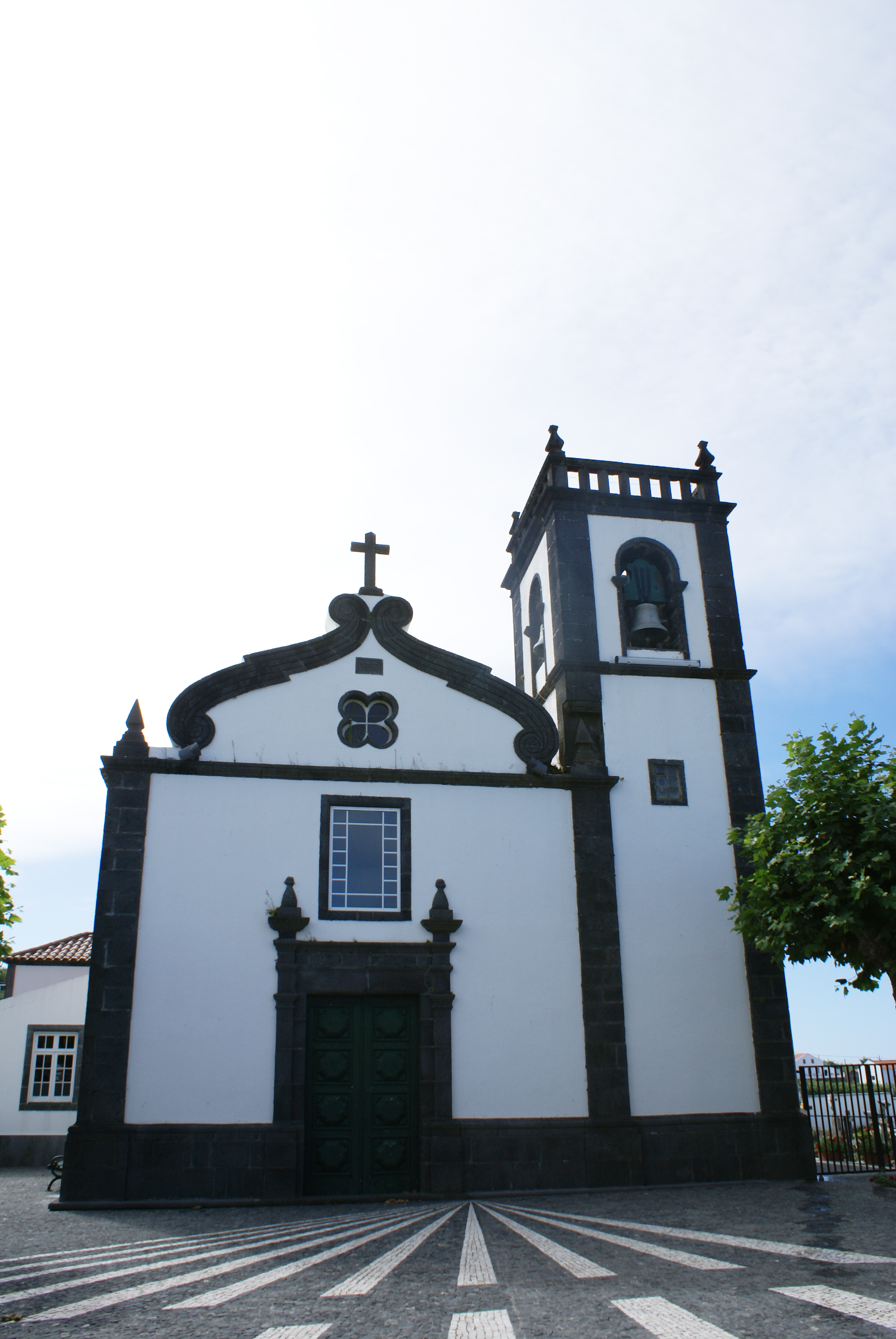
Front facade of the Church of Nossa Senhora do Pilar, Pilar da Bretanha

There are controversies as to the origins of this parish, which was inhabited between the end of the 15th century and the beginning of the 16th century. The first colonists settled along the coast, from João Bom to Remédios. At one time these small communities were disparagingly referred to as those places in the north by settlers in Ponta Delgada.

In a description by Francisco A. Chaves e Melo, the church in Pilar appeared as the center of religious life in this zone, before 1716, an area that encompassed not only present-day Pilar, but also João Bom. Little is known of the original chapel, which was dedicated to Nossa Senhora do Pilar (Our Lady of the Pillar), except for the writings of Dr. Ernesto do Canto, on his treatises on religious sanctuaries of São Miguel, titled O Preto no Branco. In his work, the author refers to the last testament of Captain João de Sousa de Vasconcelos, resident of Bretanha, who left certain items to the chapel in his will (16 March 1728). Owing to its state (practical ruins), during the second half of the 19th century, the chapel was reconstructed, taking on the church's current dimensions.

The chronicler and historian, Father Gaspar Frutuoso identified the region of Bretanha in the early part of the 1870s. As he wrote:

They refer to this place as Bretanha [which means "pertaining to Britain"]...because the land is high and rugged, and they called the older residents High Bretons; others say that, in the past, on those lands their lived and worked a Britain.

Many of these early settlers were referred to as former inhabitants of Great Britain or Brittany, and the region continued to be referred to as Bretanha throughout the centuries (many from former Templar settlements). The name stuck, even as the number of English residents dwindled in proportion to the native Portuguese that settled the lands increased. A study on the linguistic influences of Bretanha, by Maria Clara Rolão Bernardo, reaffirmed this early conviction, while Lacerda Machado noted the greater influence of immigrant populations from Alto-Alentejo subregion in the rest of the island. Frutuoso continued to identify a small community of 82 homes (in a region that extended from Nossa Senhora dos Remédios, in the northeast, to Mosteiros, in the northwest) and whose residents cultivated wheat and collected woad for export. Frutuoso, in particular, identified local resident Braz Alvres, a descendant of one of the earlier settlers, who gave his name to one of the peaks in the area (Pico de João Alvres), and who continued to tend his lands in the grotto of João Bom. Similarly, Pico da Mafra (which is located between Bretanha and Mosteiros), was named for a settler who came from the area of Mafra on the continent. It was Baron Fernandes, another resident of the grotto of João Bom, who discovered an interesting agricultural technique in order to perpetuate consistent crop yields in this region. In 1550, he came upon the idea of planting pulse (Lupinus albus) around the edges of his wheat crops, which had the effect of fortifying the wheat. He did the same for his beans, and discovered the same effects. The practice of using the pulse soon disseminated throughout the island and archipelago. Then, when another settler, Lopo Pessoa, arrived on the island he went one step further; he began to alternate his crops annually, between pulse and wheat, to increase his yields.

The locality of Pilar, by 1716, had already its own parish clergy, but administratively only had its own parochial registry after 1891.

By 1906, Bretanha (and in particular Pilar) was considered one of the most distant points from the island capital. The trip, approximately five hours in length, required a resident of the parish to journey the whole day from twilight to dusk, and cost 375 réis (departing at four in the morning and returning by sunset). The appearance of commercial automobiles allowed residents to reduce this cost to 75 réis, allowing greater mobility.

The old parish of Bretanha that extended along the northern coast of Ponta Delgada, included the localities of Remédios, Ajuda and Pilar until 13 December 1960 (Regional decree 43/392), when Remédios da Bretanha (later just Remédios), broke away from the other administrative territories (leaving behind the agglomerations of Ajuda, that included Amoreiras, and Pilar, that included João Bom. Owing to the growth in the remaining populations, and economic development of its centres, on 12 June 2002, the Regional Legislative Assembly decided to divide the remaining territory and establish the civil parishes of Ajuda and Pilar de Bretanha.

== Geography ==
The civil parish, as established by charter, is located in the northwestern coast of the island São Miguel. Its borders follow the coast, and front the crater of the Sete Cidades massif (Cumeeiras das Sete Cidades) in the interior, bordered on the east by the civil parish of Ajuda da Bretanha and west by Mosteiros. Its eastern frontier begins at the Atlantic Ocean and runs into the interior, following the waterway of the Grota da Lomba Grande, travelling south along this border between Grota da Lomba Grande and accessway to the Caminho da Lomba Grande (where it heads east until the margin), continuing south along the Grota da Lomba Grande again until reaching the Cumeeiras das Sete Cidades. Its western frontier is simply defined by the waterway of the Grota do Loural.

== Architecture ==
=== Religious ===
- Church of Nossa Senhora do Pilar (Portuguese: Igreja Paroquial de Pilar da Bretanha/Igreja de Nossa Senhora do Pilar, the church was erected at the location of a former hermitage, that was ordered built by Captain Sebastião Álvares de Benevides in 1680. It was rebuilt in 1716, and expanded over the centuries, with the last altars (dedicated to St. Anthony of Padua and St. Joseph) installed by 1800.
- Hermitage of Nossa Senhora da Boa Nova (Portuguese: Ermida de Nossa Senhora da Boa Nova/Ermida da Lombinha

== Culture ==
Religious festivals dedicated to the Holy Spirit run in most of the parish, beginning after Easter Sunday and ending on 29 June. There are also various celebrations dedicated to St. Anthony (13 June), St. John the Baptist (24 June) and St. Peter (29 June).
