= Bretanha =

Human settlement in Portugal

Coordinates: 37°53′51.6″N 25°45′27.9″W

A Bretanha was a former Portuguese civil parish in the municipality of Ponta Delgada, on the island of São Miguel in the archipelago of the Azores.

== History ==
As early as the beginning of the 16th century, the region of Bretanha was already occupied by a few settlers. The first reference to Bretanha appeared only between 1515 and 1527, since the northwestern region of the island of São Miguel was known as Capelas. In 1515, the region was deannexed from the municipality of Vila Franca do Campo and integrated into the municipality of Ponta Delgada (which was created in 1499). There is little information that survives from this period (1515-1527), a point in the region's chronology occupied with early settlement.

At that time historian Gaspar Frutuoso named then area Bretanha, for the rugged, highlands of Brittany: the area was referred to as the places of the north (and may have colloquially referred to the Portuguese vernacular, as "distant lands in the north"). Later authors would attribute the regions name to an emigrants from Brittany, who lived in the lands of this region. Francisco Drumond described it as "a port village that sheltered the furious winds, situated on land little elevated, oriented to the north, a league and half to the west of Santo António".

The church of Nossa Senhora da Ajuda existed in 1525, in 1716 the Church of Nossa Senhora da Ajuda was founded and in 1856, the Church of Nossa Senhora dos Remédios was also established, serving an ever-increasing agrarian population. These settlements were based primarily on agriculture, herding and fishing.

In 1960, Bretanha comprised three localities: Remédios, Ajuda and Pilar. Remédios was deannexed from Bretanha (by decree-law 43.392) on 13 December 1960, to form the parish of Remédios.

Bretanha ceased to function as an independent parish on 10 July 2002 (under decree-law 24A/02), when it was subdivided into two new civil parishes of Ajuda da Bretanha and Pilar da Bretanha.

== Geography ==
The parish had an area of approximately 13.03 square kilometres (5.03 mi^{2}) and approximately 1334 inhabitants at the time that it was divided, pertaining to a population density of little over 102 people per square kilometre.
