= São Vicente Ferreira =

- Civil parish
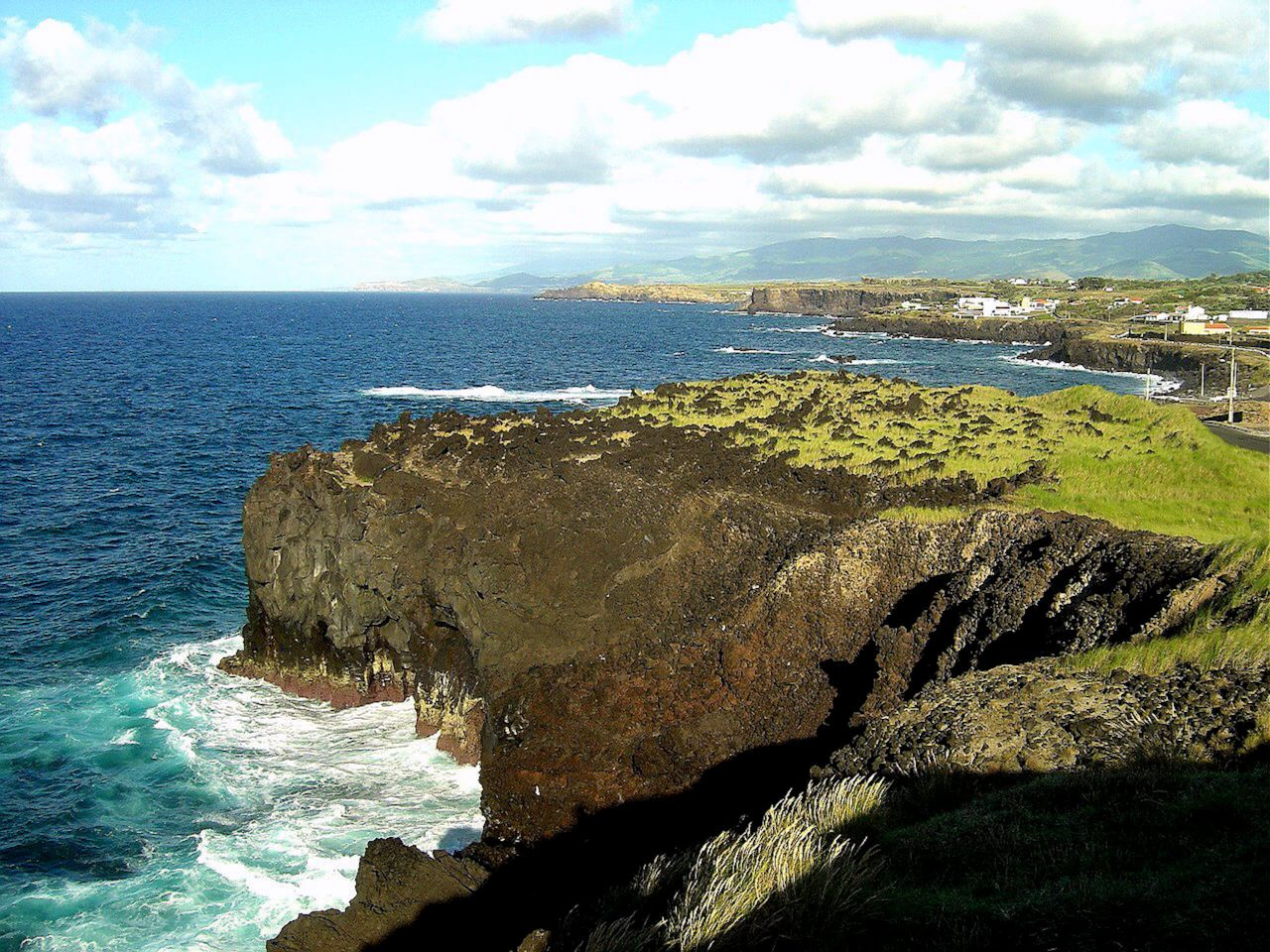
- Oceanside limits of São Vicente Ferreira, showing the high cliffs and planar relief along the northern coast

- Location of the parish of Sao Vicente Ferreira within the municipality of Ponta Delgada
- Coordinates: 37°49′6″N 25°39′57″W
- Country: Portugal
- Auton. region: Azores
- Island: São Miguel
- Municipality: Ponta Delgada

Area
  - Total: 11.42 km^{2} (4.41 sq mi)
- Elevation: 109 m (358 ft)

Population (2011)
  - Total: 2,361
  - Density: 206.7/km^{2} (535.5/sq mi)
- Time zone: UTC−01:00 (AZOT)
  - Summer (DST): UTC+00:00 (AZOST)
- Postal code: 9545-535
- Area code: 292

São Vicente Ferreira is a civil parish in the municipality of Ponta Delgada in the Portuguese archipelago of Azores. The population in 2011 was 2,361, in an area of 11.42 km^{2}.

== Geography ==
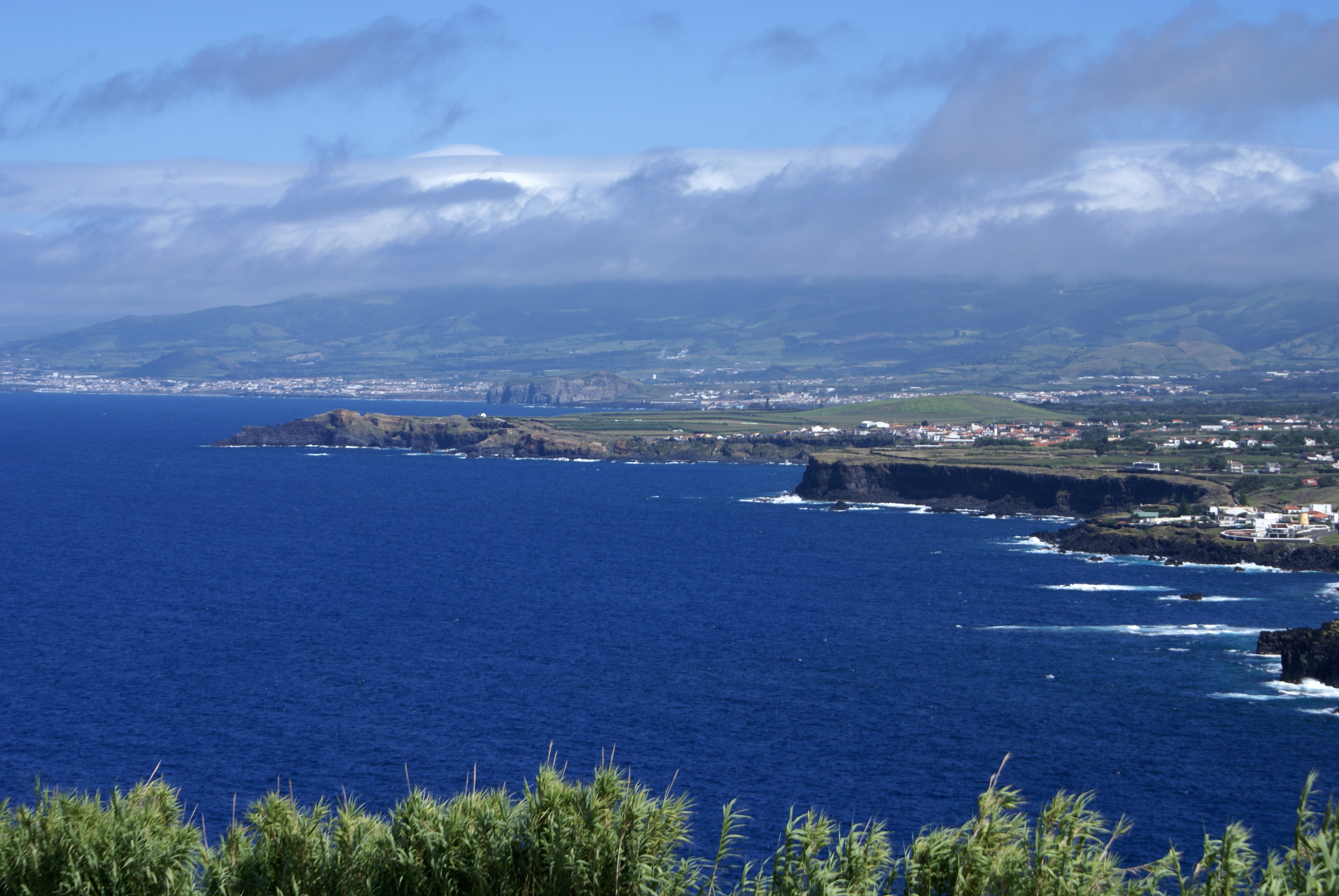
The scenic overlook of Vigia das Baleias, showing the landscape of northern São Miguel

São Vicente Ferreira is located along the northern coast of the municipality of Ponta Delgada, between the parishes of Calhetas (in the east) and Capelas (in the west). To the north is the Atlantic Ocean, and most of the settlement is concentrated along the main Regional E.R.1-1ª roadway that connects these parishes dominated by farmlands, while to the interior forests and scrub dominate the elevated hills. This roadway follows a straight line .5 kilometres (0.31 mi) from the coastal cliffs, one of the few straight links on the island. From Ponta Delgada an ancillary roadway (the E.R.4-1ª) bisects the parish before extending to the west, and reaching the frontier with Capelas, where it follows the border to the coast.

Much of the settlement of São Vicente Ferreira is located in the interior of the parish, marked by a near triangular confluence of roadways. This area is delineated by one axis, beginning with the E.R.4-1ª (Rua da Cidade) and Rua dos Poços (in the west); and the Rua da Arrenquinha, Rua do Outeiro, Rua da Igreja and Rua da Beira Mar (in the east).
