= Remédios =

- Civil parish
- The location of the civil parish of Remédios in the municipality of Ponta Delgada
- Coordinates: 37°53′9″N 25°44′10″W
- Country: Portugal
- Auton. region: Azores
- Island: São Miguel
- Municipality: Ponta Delgada

Area
  - Total: 5.59 km^{2} (2.16 sq mi)
- Elevation: 174 m (571 ft)

Population (2011)
  - Total: 931
  - Density: 170/km^{2} (430/sq mi)
- Time zone: UTC−01:00 (AZOT)
  - Summer (DST): UTC+00:00 (AZOST)
- Postal code: 9545 - 301
- Area code: 292
- Patron: Nossa Senhora dos Remédios

Remédios is a civil parish situated in along the northern coast of the municipality of Ponta Delgada in the Portuguese archipelago of the Azores. The population in 2011 was 931, in an area of 5.59 square kilometres (2.16 sq mi).

== History ==
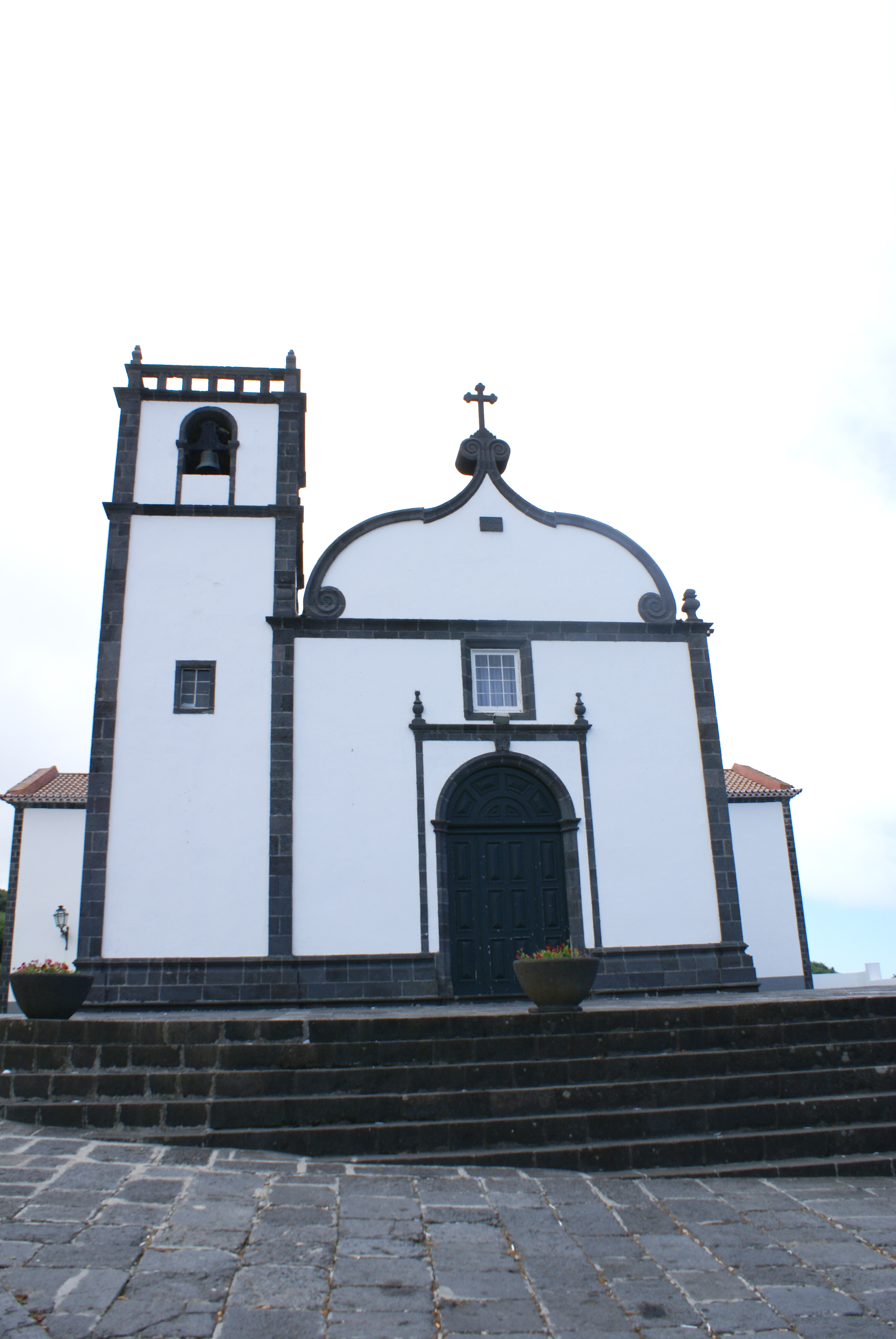
The front facade of the Chapel of Nossa Senhora dos Remédios

The parochial church was built in 1958 by order of D. Manuel Afonso de Carvalho, bishop of Angra.

The parish was elevated to the status of civil parish two years later, in 1960, when it was de-annexed from the territory of Bretanha.

== Geography ==
It is located in the northwestern part of the island of São Miguel, and includes the flanks of the Sete Cidades Massif, covered in laurisilva and endemic plant species to the coastal cliffs.
