= Ajuda da Bretanha =

- Civil parish
- Location of the civil parish of Ajuda da Bretanha, within the municipality of Ponta Delgada
- Coordinates: 37°53′55″N 25°45′47″W
- Country: Portugal
- Auton. region: Azores
- Island: São Miguel
- Municipality: Ponta Delgada
- Established: Settlement: c. 1527; Parish: c. 1646; Civil parish: 10 July 2002

Area
  - Total: 7.09 km^{2} (2.74 sq mi)
- Elevation: 166 m (545 ft)

Population (2011)
  - Total: 661
  - Density: 93/km^{2} (240/sq mi)
- Time zone: UTC−01:00 (AZOT)
  - Summer (DST): UTC+00:00 (AZOST)
- Postal code: 9545-027
- Area code: 292
- Patron: Nossa Senhora da Ajuda

Ajuda da Bretanha is a northern civil parish in the municipality of Ponta Delgada, on the island of São Miguel in the Portuguese archipelago of the Azores. It is a relatively new parish, being elevated to this status when the former parish of Bretanha was divided, forming Ajuda and Pilar da Bretanha. The population in 2011 was 661, in an area of 7.09 km^{2}. It contains the localities Ajuda da Bretanha, Amoreira and Lombinha.

== History ==
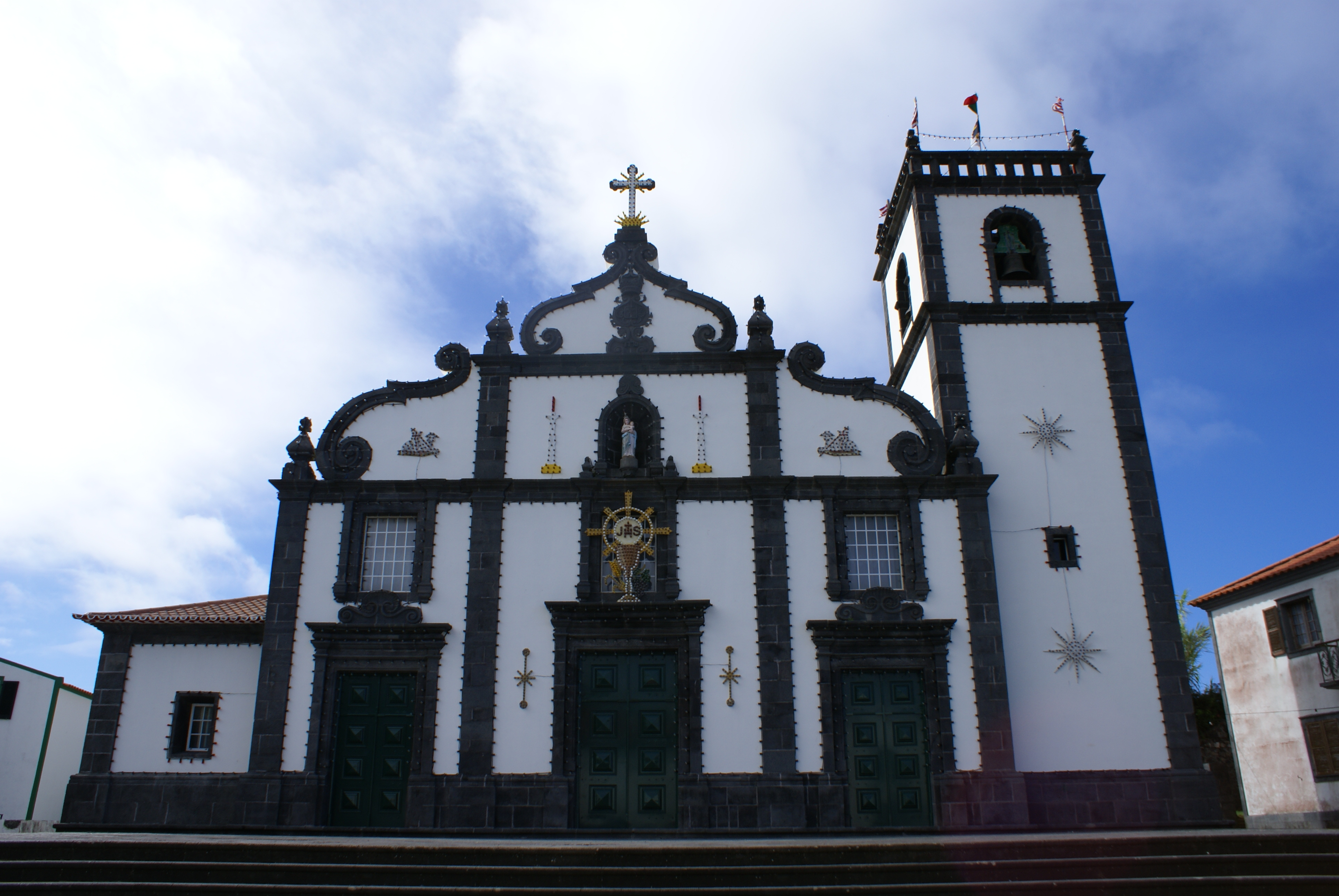
Church of Nossa Senhora da Ajuda, Ajuda da Bretanha, São Miguel

There still exists some controversy relative to the origin of Bretanha in the local lexicon. The parish received its name from the original Bretanha of the older parish, and in accordance with popular tradition, it was adopted by the local Portuguese colonists to refer to the original settlers of the area. It is assumed that the area was originally inhabited between the end of the 15th Century and/or the beginning of the 16th Century. During this period the concentration of colonists from Great Britain, or Brittany, may have led to the local designation. Even today, the area that was the parish of Bretanha is populated by people whose ethnicity are mistaken for British nationals (skin, eye or hair colors primarily), and where the local dialect is punctuated by diction and intonations reminiscent of French. When the area of Ajuda was de-annexed to form the current administration the name was adopted; a compound phrase which means: Ajuda from [the former parish of] Bretanha.

Until 1527, Bretanha was actually part of a much larger parish known as Capelas.

The parochial church is dedicated to the invocation of Nossa Senhora da Ajuda, and referenced in Gaspar Frutuoso's Saudades da Terra. Constructed at the end of the 18th Century (1770 specifically), it was constructed on the site of an older church constructed of straw, two centuries before. It is a church designed in the typical Baroque-style of the older generations, that includes a symmetrical front-facade, and bell tower; its interior consists of an ample sacristy, with a baptismal fountain constructed of pumice. An ancient image of Nossa Senhora da Ajuda, holding the Christ Child, has survived many years, and is sheltered in this church. Further, the original organ in the church was produced by Silvestre Serrão, organist at the Church of Santa Maria de Belém (Jerónimos Monastery), in Lisbon, who would construct various organs for churches in the Azores, such as in Santo António and Capelas, in addition to the Churches of São Sebastião and São Pedro in Ponta Delgada.

Originally (until 1960), Bretanha consisted of the three parishes of Remédios, Ajuda and Pilar. But, on 13 December 1960, Remédios was deannexed (under Decree 43/392) to form its own parish.

On 12 June 2002, following a survey of the populations of Bretanha and existing territorial requirements, the civil parishes of Ajuda and Pilar were created from the extinction of the historical parish of Bretanha. On the 25 February 2008, the official heraldry and coat-of-arms were officially presented by president of the Junta Freguesia.

== Geography ==
The parish borders the crater of Sete Cidades to the south and Atlantic Ocean to the north, falls between Mosteiros and Pilar da Bretanha; coastal cliffs dominate the ocean border, while sloping towards the crater (an area that includes mostly forested tracts and pasture-lands).

On its creation, Ajuda da Bretanha was defined in the following terms: its northern border included the maritime coast; its southern frontier the Cumeeiras das Sete Cidades; to the east along the border with Remédios, classified under Decree Law 43/392 (13 December 1960); and to the west, along a line that begins at the coast and follows coincident with the waters of the Grota da Lomba Grande, to the south, following the Grota da Lomba Grande and the service access of the Caminho da Lomba Grande, following this road east until it intersects the Lomba Grande once more. Continuing south, the frontier accompanies the same margin and Caminho da Lomba Grande until the Cumeeiras das Sete Cidades.

== Economy ==
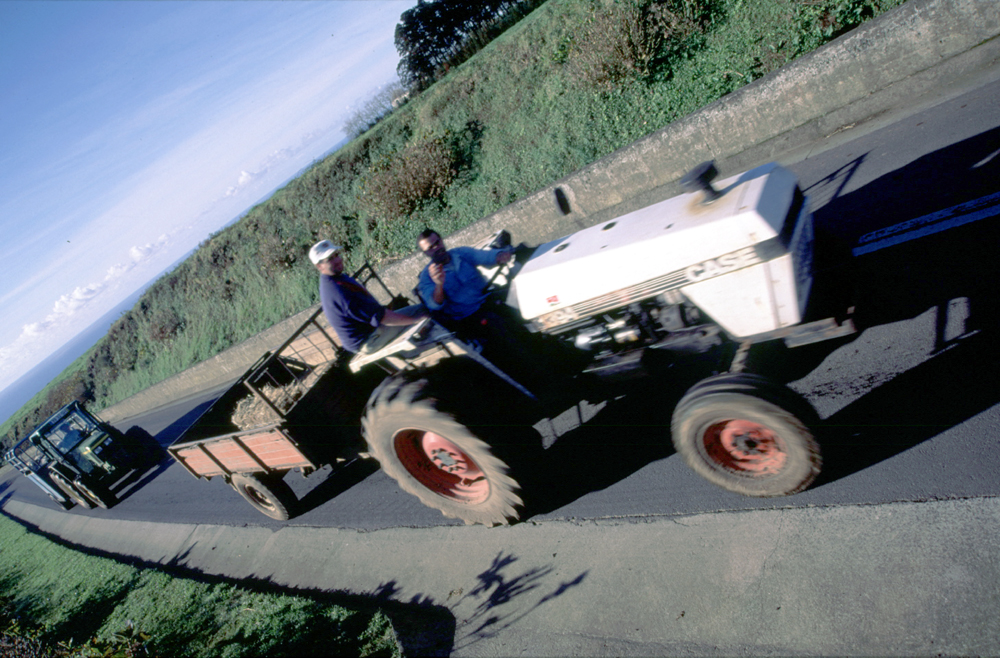
A farmer along one of the interior rural roadways leading to pastures in Bretanha

The economy of the parish is driven by agriculture and dairy-raising, although forestry does occur in the interior. In addition, a small commercial and tourist economy does exist in this community, although the economy is more subsistence oriented then the remaining parishes in Ponta Delgada.

== Architecture ==
=== Civic ===
- Windmill of Pico Vermelho (Portuguese: Moinho de vento no Lugar do Pico Vermelho), re-inaugurated on 13 August 2013, the windmill was reopened to the public after a period of remodelling, as part of a local tourist initiative for the civil parish, the windmill was an important part of the agricultural history of the community.

=== Religious ===
- Church of Nossa Senhora da Ajuda (Portuguese: Igreja Paroquial de Nossa Senhora da Ajuda da Bretanha/Igreja de Nossa Senhora da Ajuda), little is known of the history of this temple, except what could be gathered from its clergy; its first vicar was Afonso de Sampaio (began his service in 1527), and until 1640/1646 the church was dedicated to Nossa Senhora da Natividade (Our Lady of the Nativity). In 1634, Gaspar de Carvalho was vicar, receiving payment of money and three-and-a-half moios of wheat in compensation, a pattern that was repeated by 1730, when António da Silva e Sousa received similar compensation in wheat. Around 1737, the clergy that occupied this temple spent considerable funds to decorate the church.

== Culture ==
=== Festivities ===
During the month of August, Ajuda celebrates the feast of Nossa Senhora dos Anjos, with its principal religious ceremonies on August 15. From the parochial church, apart from celebrating masses in Her honor, a typical religious procession winds through the roads in the parish, accompanied by the traditional philharmonic bands.

In addition, the tradition festivals from the Divine Holy Spirit are celebrated annually from the beginning of May to the end of June in the traditional impérios of the parish.

At the beginning of the year, the feast day of Saint Anthony the Great is also celebrated on January 17.

== Notable citizens ==
- Jorge Ferreira, Portuguese American international singer emigrated in Westport, Massachusetts, United States.
- Alfredo Botelho de Sousa (1 December 1880; Bretanha - 7 April 1960; Lisbon), was a naval officer (later Admiral), Republican politician, and writer.
