= Arrifes =

Civil parish in Ponta Delgada

- Civil parish
- Location of the civil parish of Arrifes in the municipality of Ponta Delgada
- Coordinates: 37°47′8″N 25°41′55″W
- Country: Portugal
- Auton. region: Azores
- Island: São Miguel
- Municipality: Ponta Delgada
- Established: Settlement: fl.1900 Civil parish: 3 April 1959

Area
  - Total: 25.37 km^{2} (9.80 sq mi)
- Elevation: 260 m (850 ft)

Population (2011)
  - Total: 7,086
  - Density: 280/km^{2} (720/sq mi)
- Time zone: UTC−01:00 (AZOT)
  - Summer (DST): UTC+00:00 (AZOST)
- Postal code: 9500-376
- Area code: 292
- Patron: Nossa Senhora da Piedade

Arrifes is a civil parish in the municipality of Ponta Delgada on the island of São Miguel in the Azores. The population in 2011 was 7,086, in an area of 25.37 km².

== History ==
The name "Arrifes" has its origin in the Arab word "Al-rife" as meaning "reef" or coastal outcropping/rocks. It is unclear whether this name was attributed to the area around Relva originally (and expanded) or was given for other reasons.

Constructed in the second-half of the 18th-Century, the Church of Nossa Senhora da Saúde, incorporated the older chapel of the same name, originally initiated by D. Margarida Bettencourt da Câmara in her last will and testament on 12 July 1627. In 1764 and 1765 it was subject to remodelling that expanded the structure to the current dimensions. Designed in the Baroque-style of the post-modern period, this structure consists of a single tower and white-facade typical of Azorean churches, while the interior altar and sacristy have ornate gold-leaf cornices and niches.

In the area of Piedade, another chapel was constructed in the name of Nossa Senhora da Piedade, and ordered constructed by João Dias Caridade at the beginning of the 16th-Century, and subject to major renovations in 1791.

Further, the Church of Nossa Senhora dos Milgares, constructed after 1816, by the community and completed in 1831. It was this church that was responsible for elevating the community to the status of parish on 3 April 1959. Romarias and associated festivals are celebrated from this church on the first Sunday after 15 August.

== Geography ==
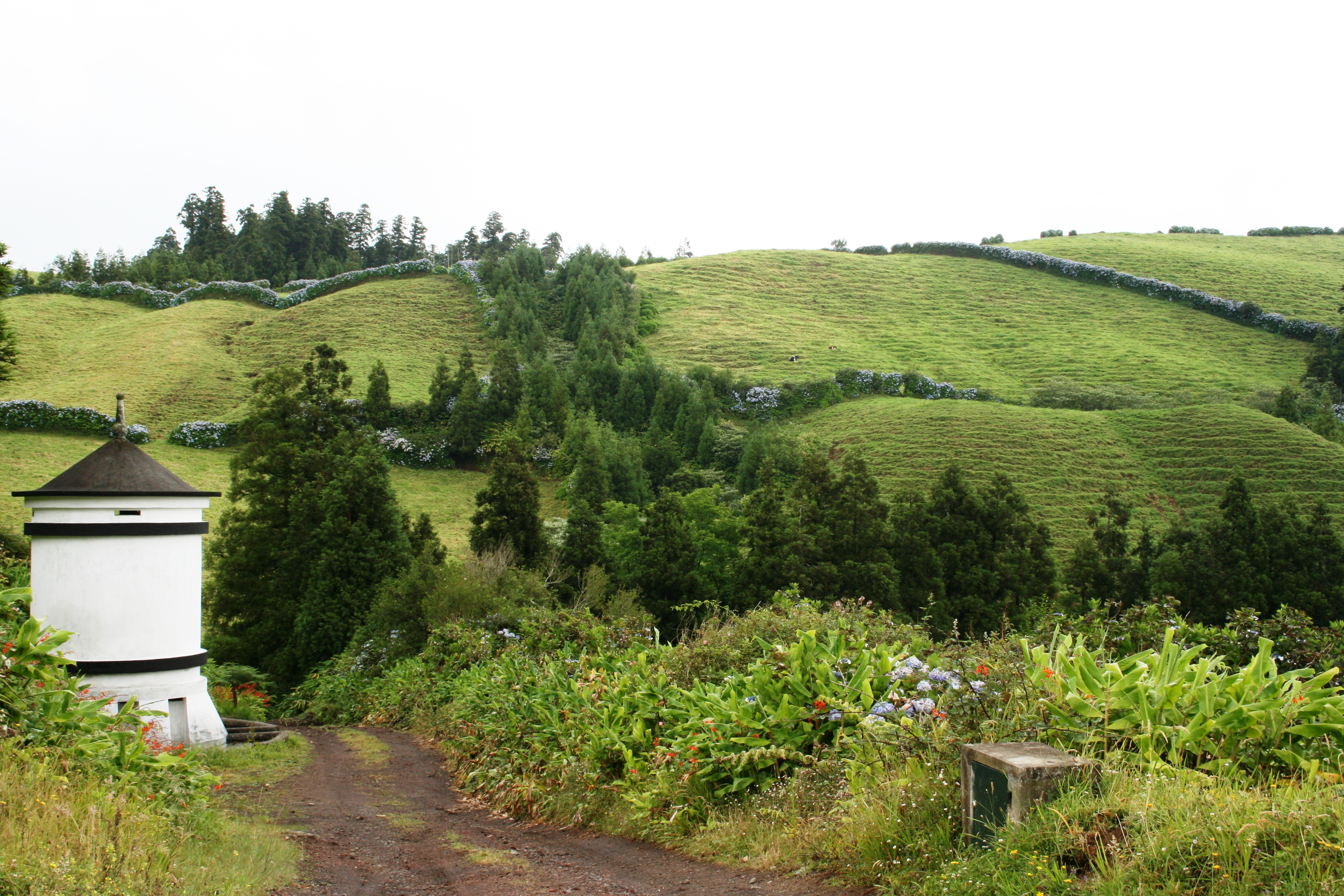
The landscape of the higher altitude terrain of Arrifes, on the road to Sete Cidades

It is situated northeast of the urbanized core of Ponta Delgada and constituted from three main localities: Piedade, Saúde and Milagres. Also, it extends from these communities toward the north-northeast until Serra Gorda, making it the largest parish in the municipality, and one of the largest on the island. Other localities are Arribanas, Castanheira, Grotinha, Nordela and Recantos.

Landlocked, Arrifes is surrounded by Capelas to the north, São Jose (Ponta Delgada) to the south, São Sebastião and Fajã de Cima to the east, and fronts the parish of Relva and Covoada to the west.

== Economy ==
Its extensive size allows the support of dairy-cattle; in fact, Arrifes is the largest milk-producing region of the Azores, and home of the islands main dairy factories, responsible for supporting most of the island's demand, as well as export requirements.

== Architecture ==
- Church of Nossa Senhora da Piedade (Portuguese: Ermida de Nossa Senhora da Piedade/Igreja de Nossa Senhora da Piedade), based on a 15th-century, later remodelled in the 20th century comprising a single nave and belltower, illuminated by a uniform series of windows along the lateral wings. The principal facade is decorated by a curvilinear pediment and oculus, the two-story belltower, decorated in cornices and balustrades, similar to the parochial Church of Candelária and Church of Ginetes;
- Church of Nossa Senhora da Saude (Portuguese: Ermida de Nossa Senhora da Saúde/Igreja Paroquial de Arrifes - Saúde/Igreja de Nossa Senhora da Saúde), a 17th-century chapel transformed into church, comprising a central nave and two aisles, presbytery, annexes and belltower on its left, illuminated intensely by rectangular lateral windows.

The church is not comparable to the Church of Fenais da Luz, which is quite narrow, but to the Church of Nossa Senhora da Ajuda da Bretanha;

- Church of Nossa Senhora dos Milagres (Portuguese: Igreja Paroquial de Arrifes - Milagres/Igreja de Nossa Senhora dos Milagres), inspired by the latter Baroque, the church has less width than Nossa Senhora da Saúde and carries the same architectural profile as Nossa Senhora da Piedade, including single nave and belltower.

== Culture ==
=== Festivities ===
The rural parish celebrates many of its religious festivals from June until late September. Firstly, there is the Romarias and festivities that are realized on the first Sunday after 15 August, from the Church of Nossa Senhora da Saúde. But these are also followed by the celebrations on the third Sunday of September at Nossa Senhora dos Milagres, and on the fourth Sunday of September at the Church of Nossa Senhora do Piedade.
