= Capelas =

- Civil parish
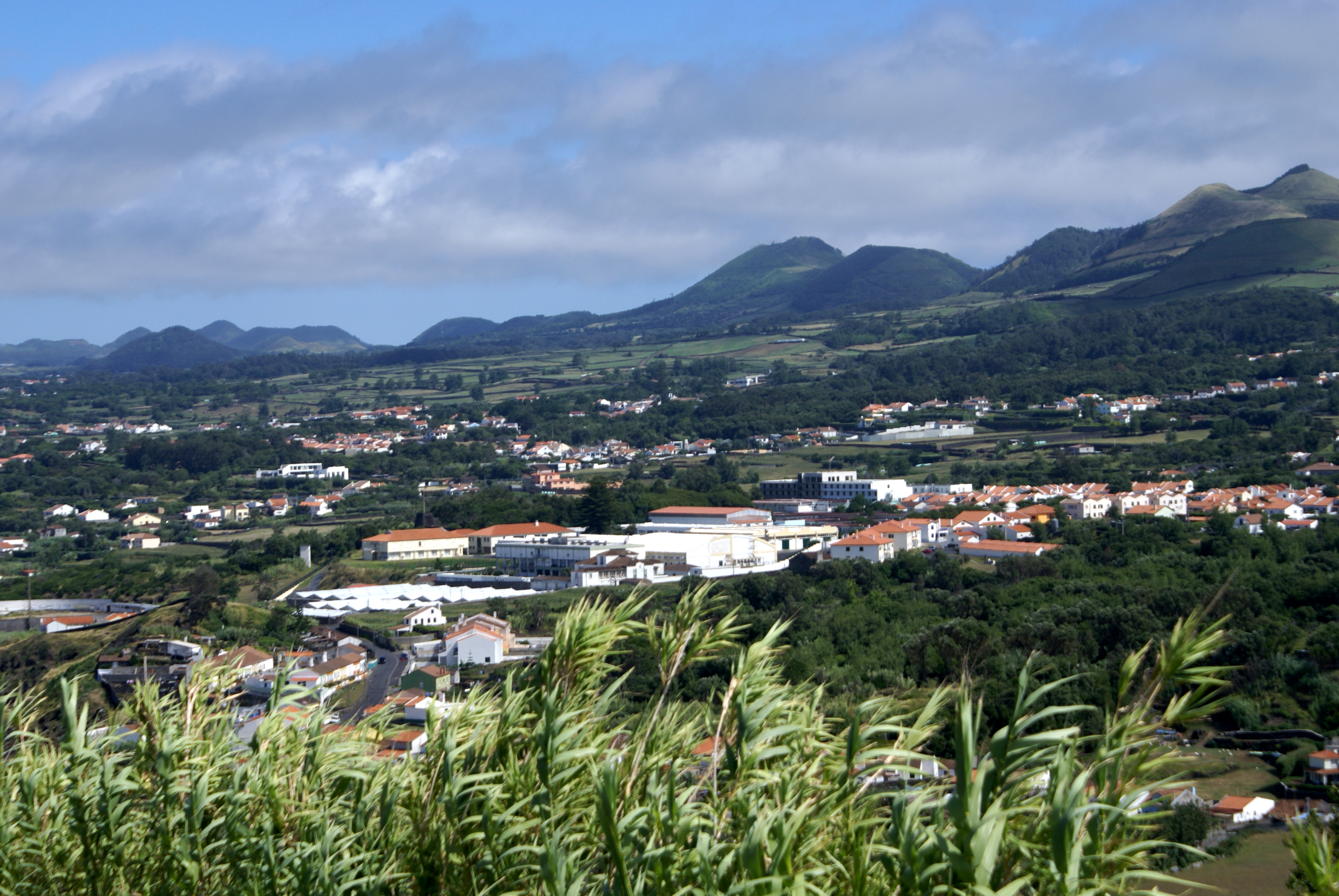
- Capelas, as seen from the Vigia das Baleias Belvedere, along the northern coast of São Miguel Island

- Location of the civil parish of Capelas in the municipality of Ponta Delgada
- Coordinates: 37°50′5″N 25°41′51″W
- Country: Portugal
- Auton. region: Azores
- Island: São Miguel
- Municipality: Ponta Delgada
- Established: Settlement: 12 February 1592; Parish: 3 July 1839

Area
  - Total: 16.85 km^{2} (6.51 sq mi)
- Elevation: 130 m (430 ft)

Population (2011)
  - Total: 4,080
  - Density: 242/km^{2} (627/sq mi)
- Time zone: UTC−01:00 (AZOT)
  - Summer (DST): UTC+00:00 (AZOST)
- Postal code: 9545-XXX
- Area code: 296
- Patron: Nossa Senhora da Apresentação

Capelas (Portuguese pronunciation: [kɐˈpɛlɐʃ]; Portuguese for chapels) is a civil parish along the northern coast of the municipality of Ponta Delgada, on the island of São Miguel in the Portuguese Azores. The population in 2011 was 4,080, in an area of 16.85 square kilometres (6.51 mi^{2}).

== History ==
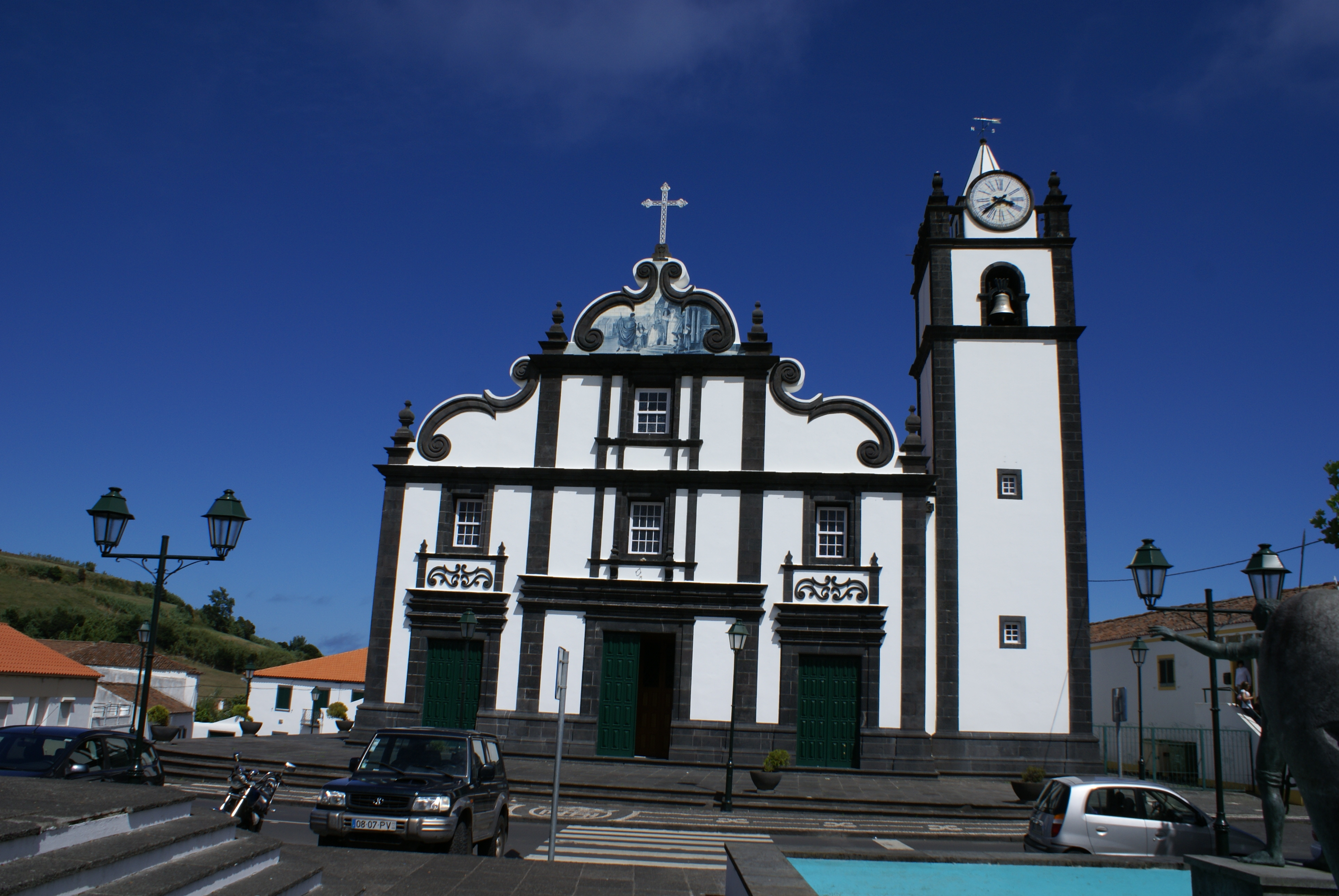
Parochial church of Nossa Senhora da Apresentação in the main square, opposite the Polivalente (English: community center)

The first settlements congregated around the port of Poços, along the northern edge that divides Capelas from São Vicente Ferreira; its first settlers establishing shelters in and around the 16th Century. With elevation of Capelas to (religious) parish it became integrated within the municipality of Ponta Delgada (on 11 July 1592). This administrative dependency lasted until it was elevated to status of vila, as stipulated by the Carta de Lei (Charter Law) conferred by Queen D. Maria, on July 10, 1839.

There exists a couple of versions for Capela's toponymic origin. Father Gaspar Frutuoso in Saudades das Terras notes the following:

"Some say that they call it 'capelas', not because there existed in those parts churches or chapels, but that on the feast day of Saint John [the Baptist] some men constructed there some [small] chapels, forgetting them hung from a tree..."

Likewise, the brothers Bullar, in an account in their journeys, referred to a likely reality: they refer to a general local reference to the rocks along the coast as capelas, rocks taking on the appearance of small grottos and seeming to appear as chapels.

Its main church, to the invocation of Nossa Senhora da Apresentação (Our Lady of the Presentation) was raised on the ruins of an older priory and concluded in 1780. Similarly, the church of Nossa Senhora da Conceição, built on the orders of Captain Agostinho de Medeiros Costa, in the 17th century, and reconstructed and expanded in 1830. Although Capelas may not have been named for the religious sanctuaries that were erected there, there are many to speak of, including the chapels of Anjo da Guarda, Santa Rita, Nossa Senhora do Rosário and Nossa Senhora de Santana, as well as many smaller hermitages to the invocation of the Holy Spirit.

During the whaling era in the Azores (early to middle 20th Century), Capelas was an important northern processing center on the island of São Miguel; close to the public pools around Poços is the ruins of the mixed-use factory used to process whale oil and mill flour. In Calhau Miúdo there existed two factories (Companhia Nova and Companhia Velha) to process whale byproducts during this period.

== Geography ==
View of the Morre of Capelas, along the northern coast, as seen from the outlook in São Vicente Ferreira

Located along the northern coast, the parish has been connected to major centers by a series of roads linking the community to the city of Ponta Delgada (to the south), Mosteiros (to the west) and Ribeira Grande (to the east). Farmlands dominate the north and east portions of the parish, while the area from the E.R.1-1ª regional road towards the interior are dominated by mountains, river valleys and some ancient volcanic cones.

The administrative extent of Capelas incorporates the localities (Portuguese: lugares) of Teatro Novo, Conceição and Poços.

Capelas has two small ports, one of which (known as "Poços") played a crucial role during centuries when Capelas was an important whaling center.

== Culture ==
=== Festivities ===
On the fourth Sunday of August, the community celebrates the feast day of the parishes patron, Our Lady of the Presentation. Similar acts of faith are also expressed in the festivals of Corpo de Deus (Body of Christ) and Nossa Senhora de Lurdes (Our Lady of Lourdes). Apart from celebrating masses, a typical religious procession will wind through the roads in the parish, accompanied by the traditional philharmonic bands.
