= Mosteiros (Ponta Delgada) =

- Civil parish
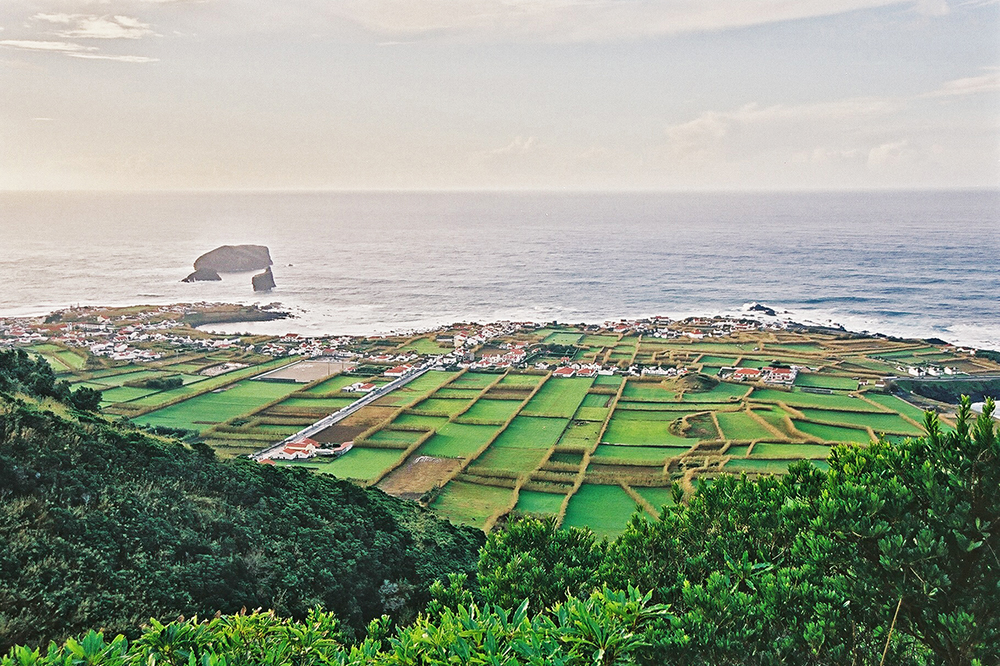
- A coastal perspective of the village of Mosteiros, the westernmost settlement on the island of São Miguel

- Location of the civil parish of Mosteiros in the municipality of Ponta Delgada
- Coordinates: 37°53′1″N 25°48′58″W
- Country: Portugal
- Auton. region: Azores
- Island: São Miguel
- Municipality: Ponta Delgada

Area
  - Total: 8.95 km^{2} (3.46 sq mi)
- Elevation: 200 m (660 ft)

Population (2011)
  - Total: 1,123
  - Density: 125/km^{2} (325/sq mi)
- Time zone: UTC−01:00 (AZOT)
  - Summer (DST): UTC+00:00 (AZOST)
- Postal code: 9555-156
- Area code: 292
- Patron: Nossa Senhora da Conceição

Mosteiros is a civil parish in the municipality of Ponta Delgada on the Portuguese island of São Miguel in the Azores. The population in 2011 was 1,123, in an area of 8.95 square kilometres (3.46 mi^{2}). It contains the localities Chã das Machadas, Lomba dos Homens, Lombinha and Mosteiros.

== History ==
It was only around 1480, that the first people began to settle this part of the island, mostly by the maritime access, for many years. The community of Mosteiros was built on ancestral fishing for many years, even as its territory was cultivated by farmers.

The name Mosteiros, meaning monastery in the Portuguese language, refers to nearby islets: the largest of these islets is shaped like a church. As Gaspar Frutuoso noted:

"Between the large islet and ponta Ruiva, by the cliffs, until the promontory of Escalvados, there are some large depressions and well made fumaroles, in the form of a church, or monasteries, or of both things, that older settlers called the monasteries [Mosteiros], situated on the fajã that ran from the peak in Sete Cidades".

The parochial church, dedicated to Our Lady of the Conception, was constructed at various stages and remotes the beginning of the 17th century.

== Geography ==
Mosteiros is located in the northwestern part of the island of São Miguel, connected by the Estrada Regional 1-1ª roadway to Ponta Delgada in the southeast and Ribeira Grande in the northeast. The main village is located on a fajã at the tip of the island, surrounded by coastal cliffs that reach 20 metres (66 ft). The parish is primarily recognizable by a group of islets that lie offshore: two small islets to the northwest, and a group in the southwest, including one further west and two smaller islets, slightly east of the large islet.

The development of the community has been highlighted by the construction of two triatos or impérios, associated with Cult of the Holy Spirit: the Impéro da Grota (located in the garden near the main Church) and the Império das Lombas (raised over the old structure). In addition, several reparations were completed on the school Escola Comendador Ângelo José Dias, the seat of the parish, philharmonic band and extension of the ETAR (sewage and drainage). The Jardim da Eira Velha, a greenspace in the community was also elaborated, overlooking the sea and fishing port, in addition to the changing rooms of the football field.

The conclusion of the Caminho da Pedra Queimada, which connects the Rua das Pensões to the regional roadway (at Lomba dos Homens) was part of an attempt to improve the community's access. This was also the case with the paving and extensions of the Caminho do Concelho, which connects the Ramal dos Mosteiros to Pico de Mafra. Another solution defended by the parish council was the opening of a new road along the cliffs to the top of Rua das Vinhas until Rua Nova, a solution that has the foresight of providing new residential homes.

=== Climate ===
Climate data for Mosteiros, 1977-1995, altitude 25 m (82 ft)
Month	Jan	Feb	Mar	Apr	May	Jun	Jul	Aug	Sep	Oct	Nov	Dec	Year
Average precipitation mm (inches)	120.4 (4.74)	113.8 (4.48)	108.1 (4.26)	85.8 (3.38)	53.1 (2.09)	45.0 (1.77)	33.5 (1.32)	44.2 (1.74)	128.3 (5.05)	100.4 (3.95)	164.4 (6.47)	116.8 (4.60)	1,113.8 (43.85)
Source: Portuguese Environmental Agency

== Tourism ==
It is a popular parish in the summer, both among residents of the island and national and foreign tourists. It is an ideal place for those who enjoy the coast and the sea, whether for swimming, fishing or kayaking along the coast. There is also the Caminho Velho, which connects Mosteiros (Lombas) to the Miradouro do Escalvado, and another path that connects Mosteiros to João Bom do Pilar da Bretanha. Since 2016, it has been possible to take boat trips from the port to see whales and dolphins or visit the islets or Ferraria by sea. The area is also known for its sunsets. Local restaurants serve fish and seafood dishes, and there are also several snack bars in the area.

== Economy ==
Fishing is still practiced with nets and also with handline method, and agriculture dominates in the interior, with herding of dairy cattle and the cultivation of some fruits and vegetables.

== Culture ==
There is a music festival in Mosteiros, Festival das Marés, where Banda Fundação Brasileira organizes 3 days of music and even play with one of the guest artist. There is also another philharmonic band in Mosteiros, Banda Harmonia Mosteirense; in the past there was a rivalry between the two bands, something that has stopped and all are friends now. There is also festivities in honour of the patron saint that occur on the third Sunday of August.
