= Ponta Delgada City Hall =

- Paços do Concelho de Ponta Delgada
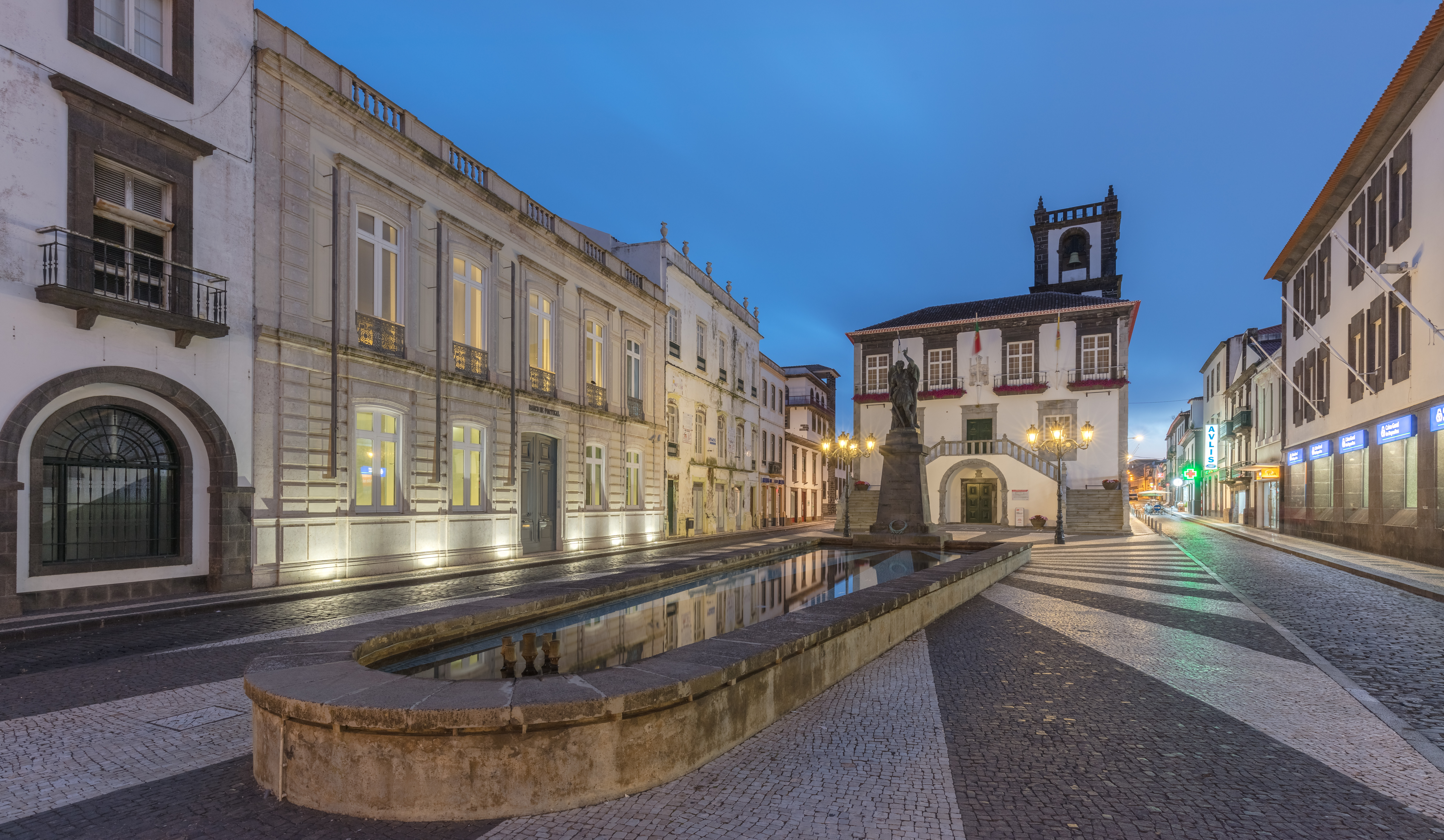
- A view of the municipal palace in front of the municipal square
- Interactive map of the Ponta Delgada City Hall area

General information
- Type: City Hall
- Architectural style: Medieval
- Location: São Sebastião, Portugal
- Coordinates: 37°44′21″N 25°40′9.1″W
- Owner: Portuguese Republic

Technical details
- Material: Masonry stone

Website
- www.cm-pontadelgada.pt

Ponta Delgada City Hall (Portuguese: Paços do Concelho de Ponta Delgada) is a 17th-century structure constructed to house the municipal council/authority, situated in the civil parish of São Sebastião, municipality of Ponta Delgada, on the Portuguese archipelago of the Azores.

== History ==
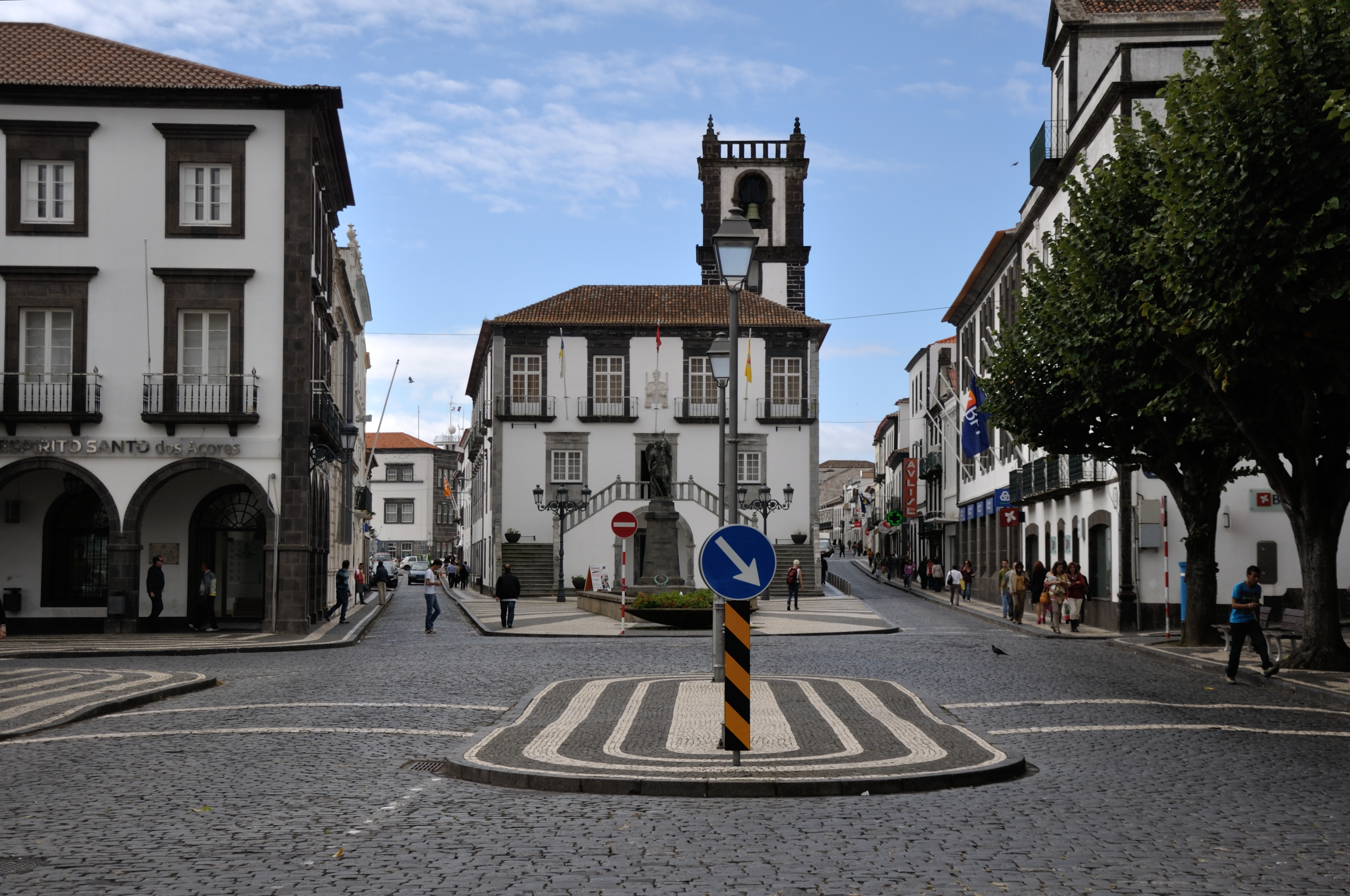
A view of the municipal building boxed in by surrounding buildings just off the Praça Gonçalo Velho

In 1499, the village of Ponta Delgada was raised to the status of town. On 2 April 1546, a regal charter issued by King D. John III elevated the growing settlement to the status of city, this, owing to the destruction of Vila Franca do Campo, following an earthquake and landslide that obliterated the regional capital overnight in 1522.

The primitive building that served as municipal hall were likely located just in front of the parochial church of São Sebastião.

By the end of the 17th century, construction of the current building was undertaken. An inscription over the coat-of-arms (1724) of the bell tower portico indicates its construction.

By the 20th century, the building was literally in ruins, with a plaque located on site indicating that it was going to be demolished.

By the middle of the 20th century, the president of the Câmara Municipal, Alberto Oliveira, ordered the buildings recuperation. Photographs from this period show a building with windows and varandas flanking the door on the second floor and a series of scaffolding covering the facade.

A secondary series of restorative work and updates were carried-out in the second half of the 20th century, in order to modernize and adapt the building for its continued purpose.

== Architecture ==
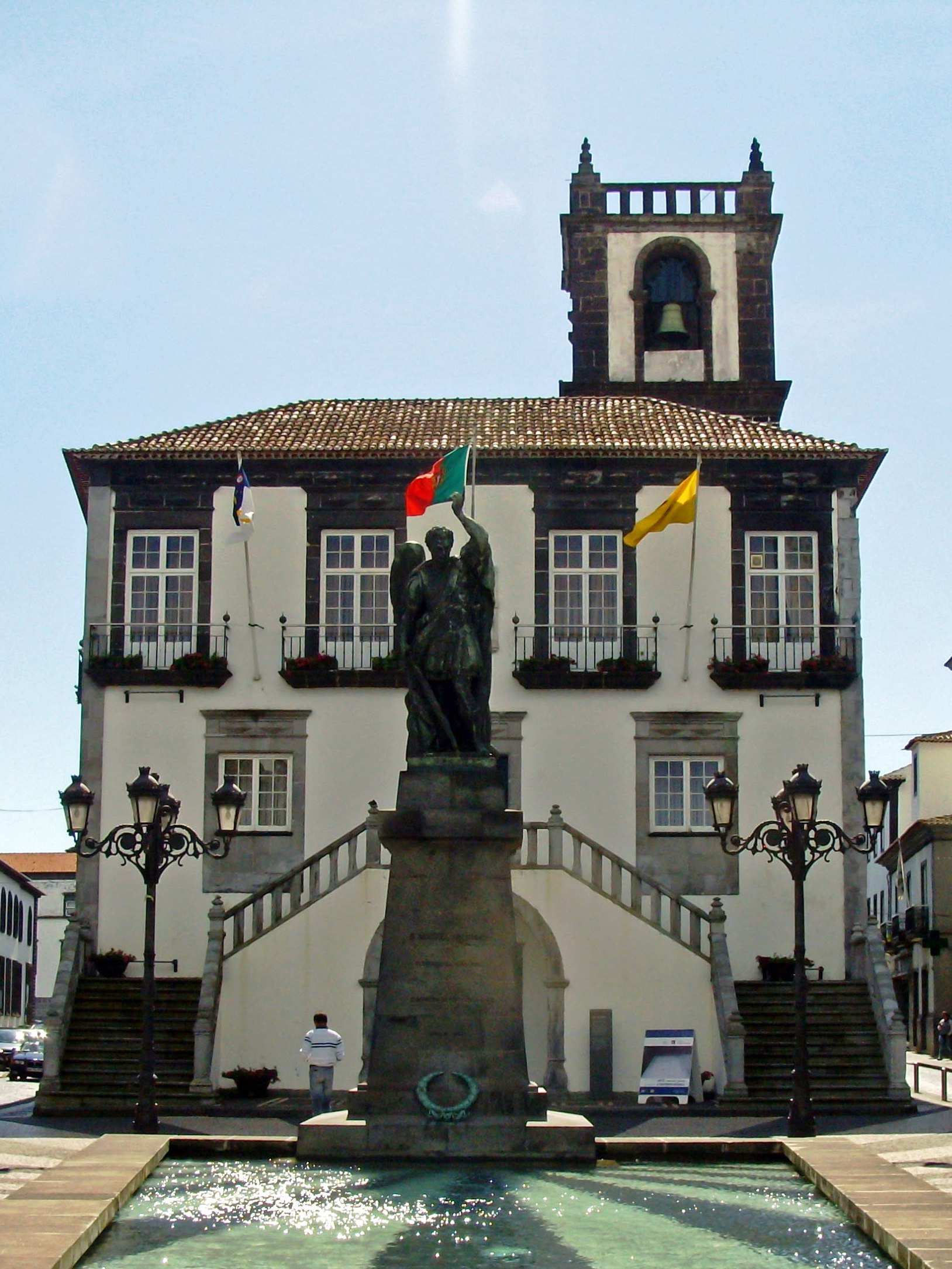
The front facade (from the reflecting pool and monument of the Archangel Michael) showing the characteristic two staircases, three floors and bell tower

The building is central located in the hub of the town, erected at the eastern end of a block that makes up the urban nucleus of the city of Ponta Delgada, encircled by roadways, pedestrian crosswalks and Portuguese pavement stone with reflecting pool surmounted by a monument to the archangel Michael (from which the island obtains its name). To the east is another square (Praça Gonçalo Velho), marked by the Portas da Cidade and a statue of the explorer Gonçalo Velho, opposite the parochial church of São Sebastião.

The municipal building has an irregular trapezoidal plan and rectangular bell tower addorsed to the right lateral facade, covered in tiled roofing. The three floors, with stonework embrasures, pilastered cornerstones and decorative friezes, are also decorated with diamond-shape points and cornices. The principal facade, oriented to the northeast, is proceed by two staircases on either side connecting at a landing in the central balcony, reinforced by stone balustrade and by pinnacles. On the ground floor, there is a central landing to archway framed over pilasters over gabled plinths and terminated in cornice, surmounted by ashlar. The second floor is divided into three sections, corresponding to the a doorway flanked by two picture windows framed by stone work and surmounted by frieze decorated with two diamond points and cornice. The third floor has four windows with the same framing and guarded in wrought iron, with a central royal coat-of-arms. The lateral left facade of two floors is defined by regular pilasters, the left with six vains and the left with two, both rectangular and framed by stonework. The right lateral facade has two veins similar to the lateral left facade, although the second and third floors also includes a circular oculus. The long vertical bell tower, with cornerstones in masonry stone and joints painted white, includes two registers, separated by frieze and cornice and terminated by frieze and cornice surmounted by balustrade and pinnacles. The tower, which is recessed from the square (on the back half of the municipal building), has a high base of stonework torn by straight portal, concave and topped with royal coat-of.inscribed with the date of 1724. On the second register belfry, there are arched openings over pilasters.

The interior, from the main landing is the reception hall, that leads by staircase to the main hall.
