= São Sebastião (Ponta Delgada) =

- Civil parish
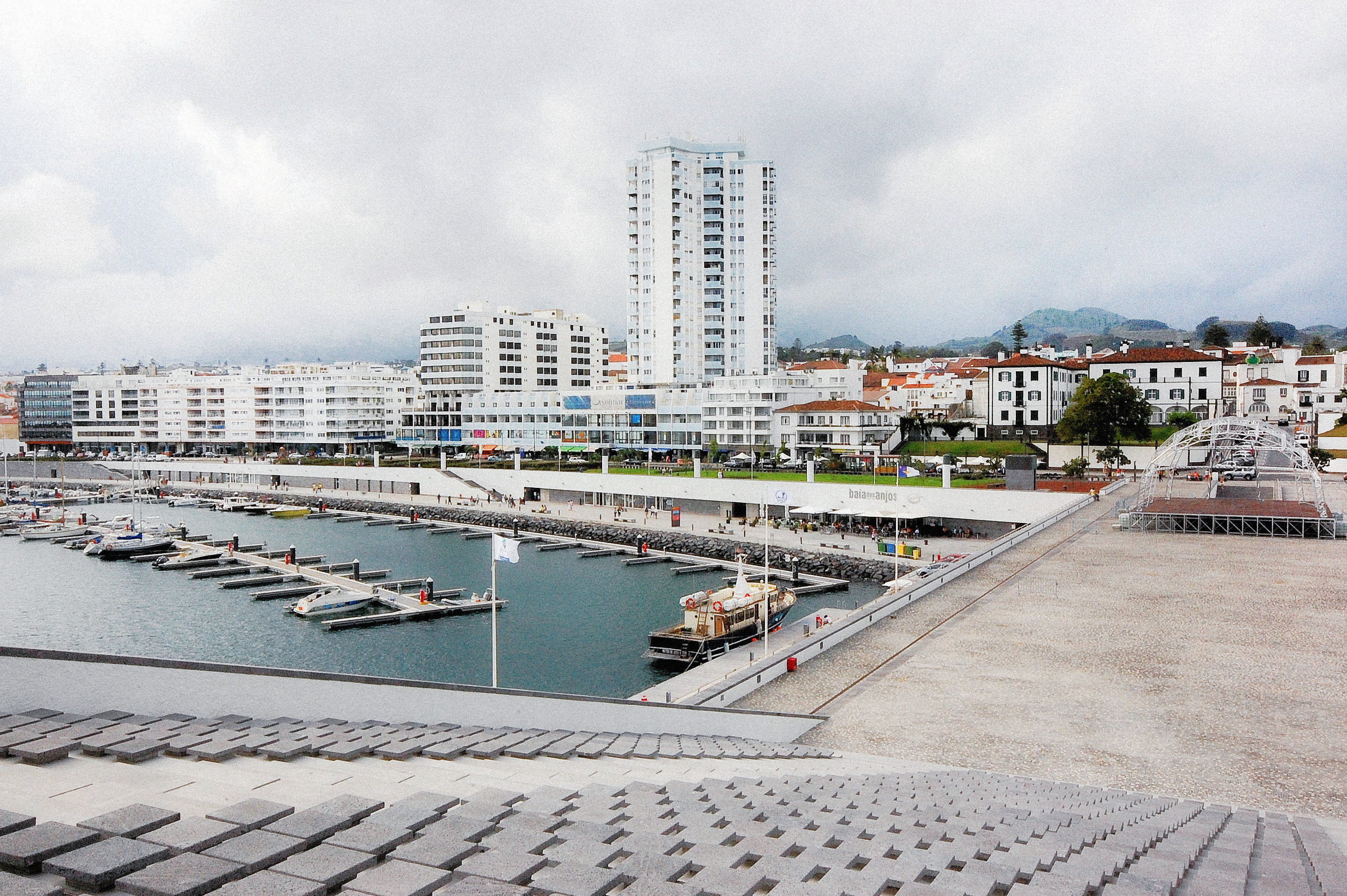
- The urbanized coastal limit of Ponta Delgada at São Sebastião, including the commercial mall and business quarter, as seen from the Portas do Mar

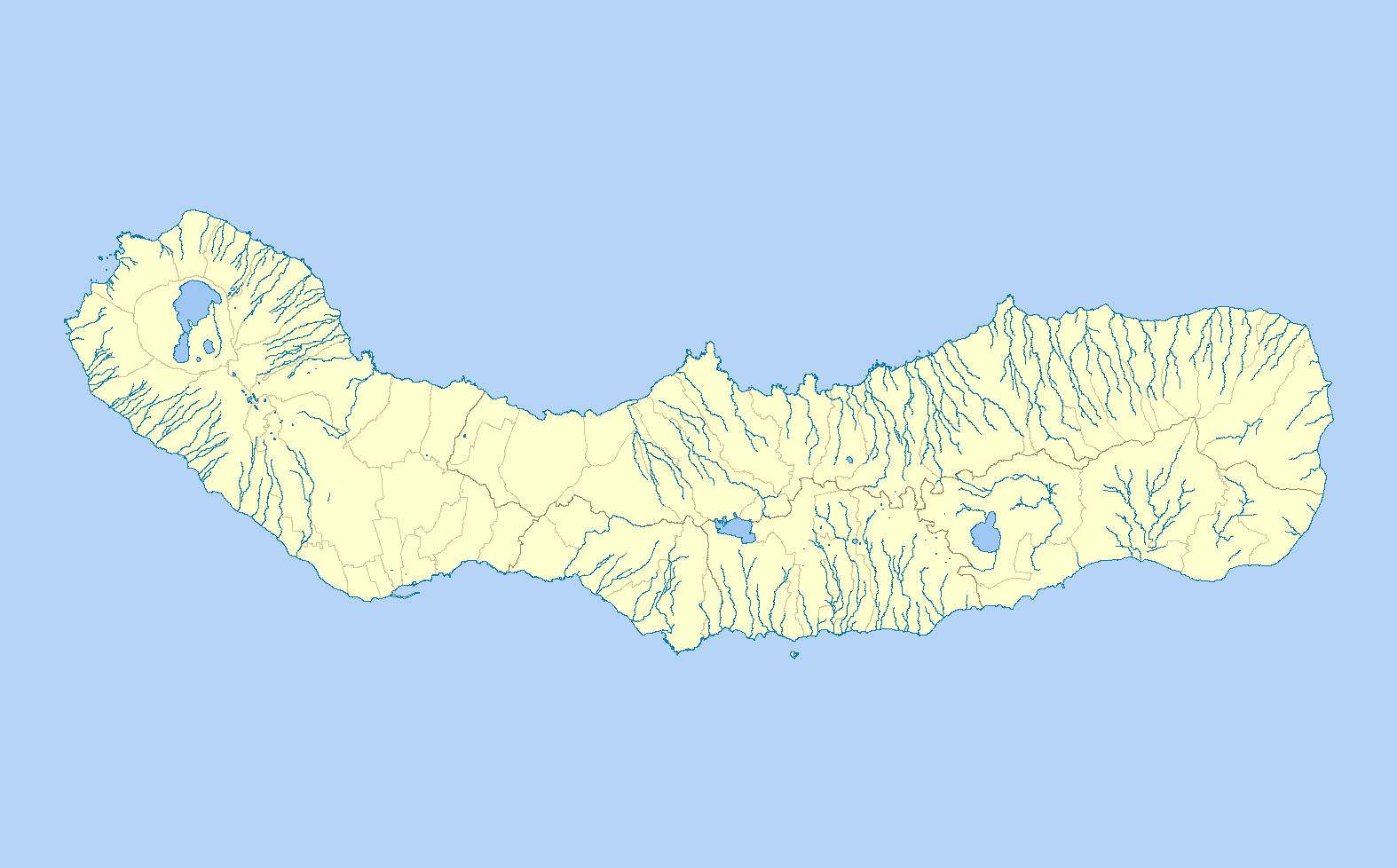
- Location in the Azores São Sebastião (São Miguel)
- Coordinates: 37°44′54″N 25°40′15″W
- Country: Portugal
- Auton. region: Azores
- Island: São Miguel
- Municipality: Ponta Delgada

Area
  - Total: 3.34 km^{2} (1.29 sq mi)
- Elevation: 65 m (213 ft)

Population (2011)
  - Total: 3,953
  - Density: 1,180/km^{2} (3,070/sq mi)
- Time zone: UTC−01:00 (AZOT)
  - Summer (DST): UTC+00:00 (AZOST)
- Postal code: 9500-055
- Area code: 292
- Patron: São Sebastião

São Sebastião (Portuguese for Saint Sebastian) is a parish (freguesia) in the municipality of Ponta Delgada in the Azores. The population in 2011 was 3,953, in an area of 3.34 km^{2}. The parish is part of the downtown area of Ponta Delgada. Until June 30, 2003, the parish was known as Matriz (Ponta Delgada).

== Economy ==
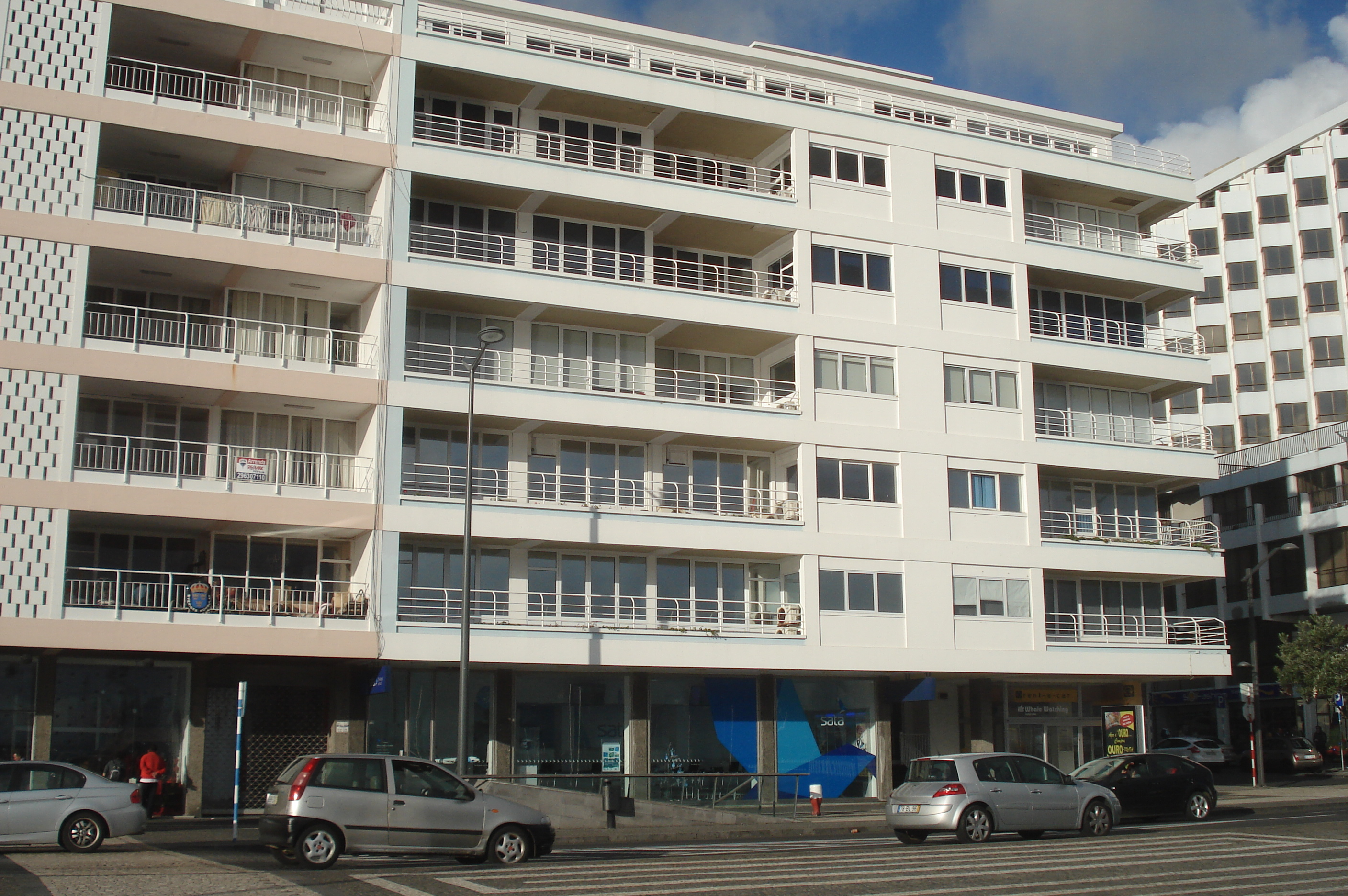
The SATA Group headquarters along the Avenida marginal

The [[SATA Group]], through its subsidiaries [[SATA Air Açores]] and [[Azores Airlines]], has its head office in the parish.

== Architecture ==
=== Civic ===
- City Gates (Portuguese: Portas da Cidade)
- Caixa Geral de Depósitos (CGD) Building
- Comando da Defesa Marítima of Ponta Delgada Building
- Correios, Telégrafos e Telefones (CTT) Building
- Estate of Solar do Condes de Albuquerque
- Estate of Solar José do Canto (also known as Solar Scholtze or Solar Bérquos)
- Estate of Solar São Joaquim
- House on Rua do Melo No.62 (Portuguese: Casa Carlos Bicudo)
- House on Rua Dr. Guilherme Poças, No.14
- House on Rua Dr. Luís Bettencourt, No.24-28
- House on Rua Margarida Chaves, No.28
- House in Largo Marquês de Pombal
- Hospital of Ponta Delgada
- Jardim de Francisco Bettencourt
- Municipal Palace/Hall of Ponta Delgada (Portuguese: Câmara Municipal de Ponta Delgada/Paços do Concelho de Ponta Delgada), the 17th century municipal hall/seat of government for the municipality; a three-story building situated in the central square, making Ponta Delgada the de facto capital of the [[Azores]], following the destruction of [[Vila Franca do Campo]] in 1522.
- Palace of Santana, also known as the Palace of Jácome Correia - the official residence of the President of the Regional Government of the Azores

=== Religious ===
- Chapel of Sant'Ana
- Church of the Jesuit College, located in the Largo do Marquês de Pombal, half a kilometre north of the historic centre, the Church was part of a group of buildings constructed by the [[Society of Jesus|Companhia de Jesus]] (the Jesuits) to provide ecclesiastical education to the residents of Ponta Delgada. The church, officially the Church of Todos-os-Santos (All Saints) was constructed through the initiatives of João Lopes, who convinced the Jesuit priests and Diocese of Angra to establish their school. The church is characterized by a grand façade of imposing doors, circular windows and verandas, topped by an incomplete double clock-tower. It is one of the peripheral buildings of the Carlos Machado Museum (sacred arts wing), the home of the Library and Archive of Ponta Delgada, and its convent's annexes occupied by offices of the regional government.
- Church of São Sebastião
- Church of Santa Bárbara
- Convent of Santo André* Chapel of São Brás
