= Church of the Jesuit College (Ponta Delgada) =

- Church of All Saints
- Igreja do Colégio dos Jesuítas
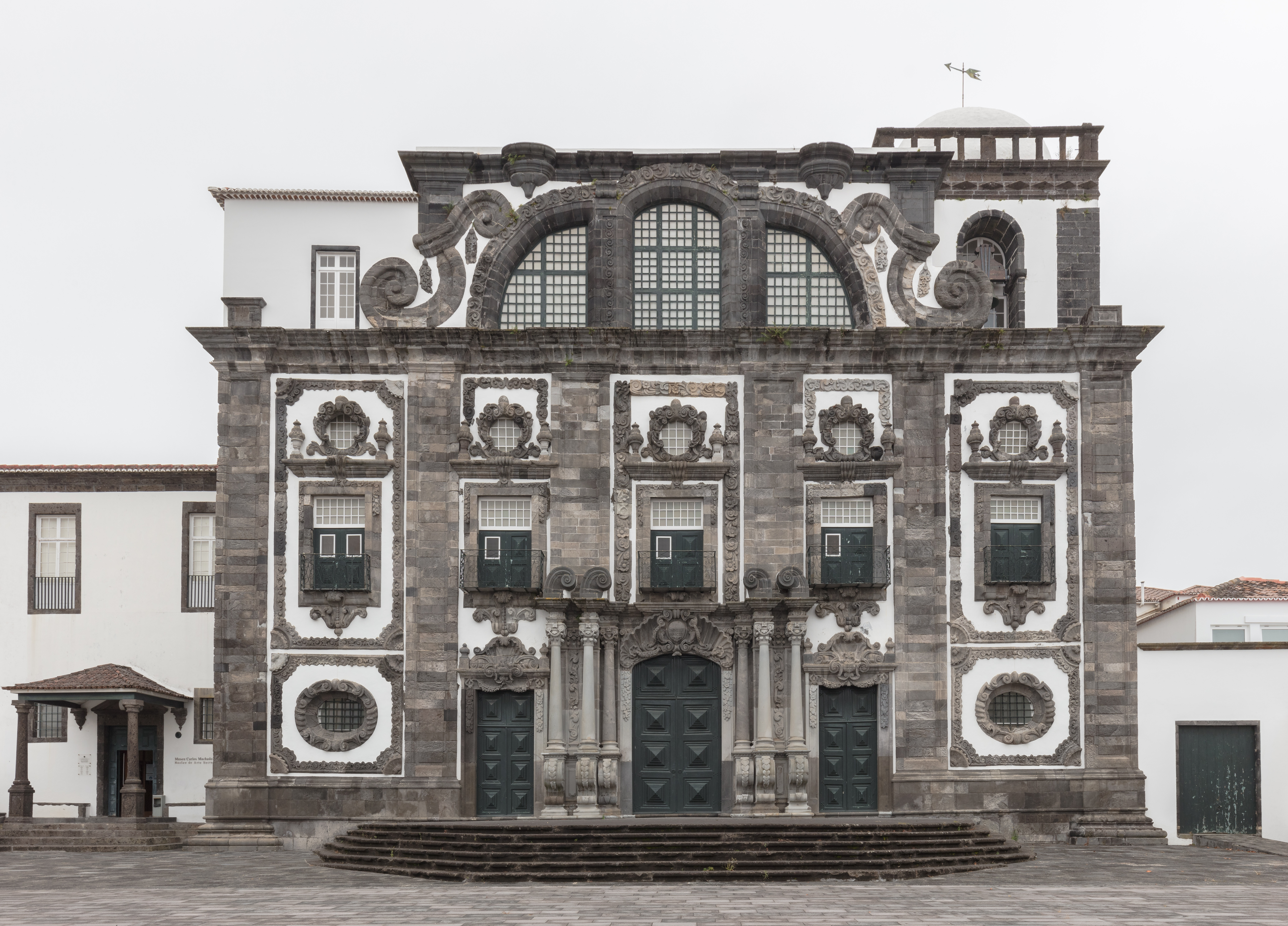
- The ornate front façade of the church of the Jesuits in Ponta Delgada

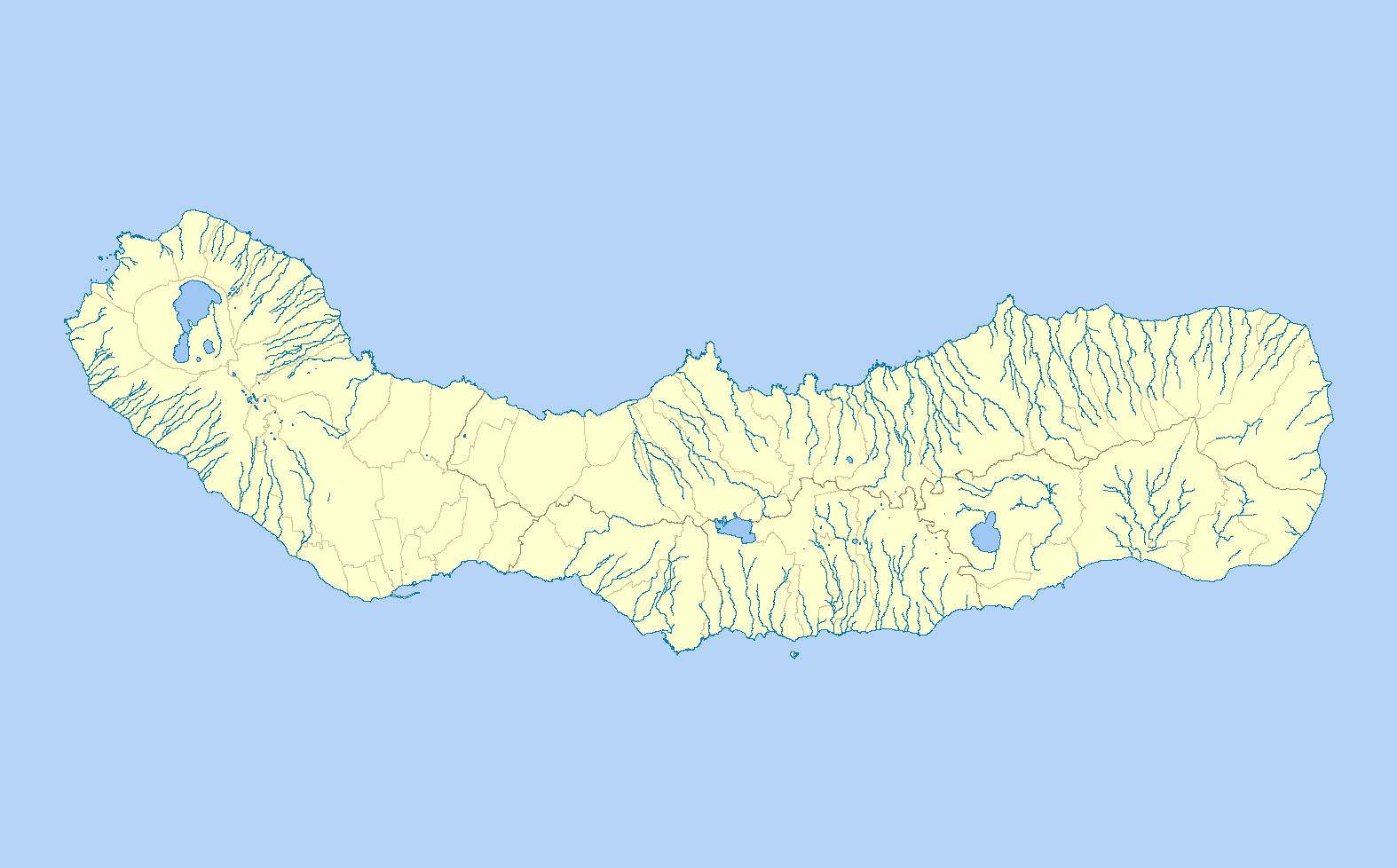
- Location of the church on the island of São Miguel
- 37°44′37″N 25°40′11.62″W
- Location: São Miguel, Central, Azores
- Country: Portugal
- Denomination: Roman Catholic

History
- Dedication: colégio dos jesuítas Portuguese for Jesuit College

Architecture
- Architect(s): João Lopes, Gonçalo Vaz Coutinho, José Martins, João Ferreira, Bartolomeu Antunes
- Style: Medieval

Specifications
- Length: 36.44 m (119.6 ft)
- Width: 27.95 m (91.7 ft)

The Church of the Jesuit College (Portuguese: Igreja do Colégio dos Jesuítas de Ponta Delgada), is a church in the municipality of Ponta Delgada, in the civil parish of São Sebastião, part of the historic centre of regional centre. It was also known as the Church of All Saints (Portuguese: Igreja de Todos-os-Santos), when the temple was constructed by the early settlers to the island.

== History ==
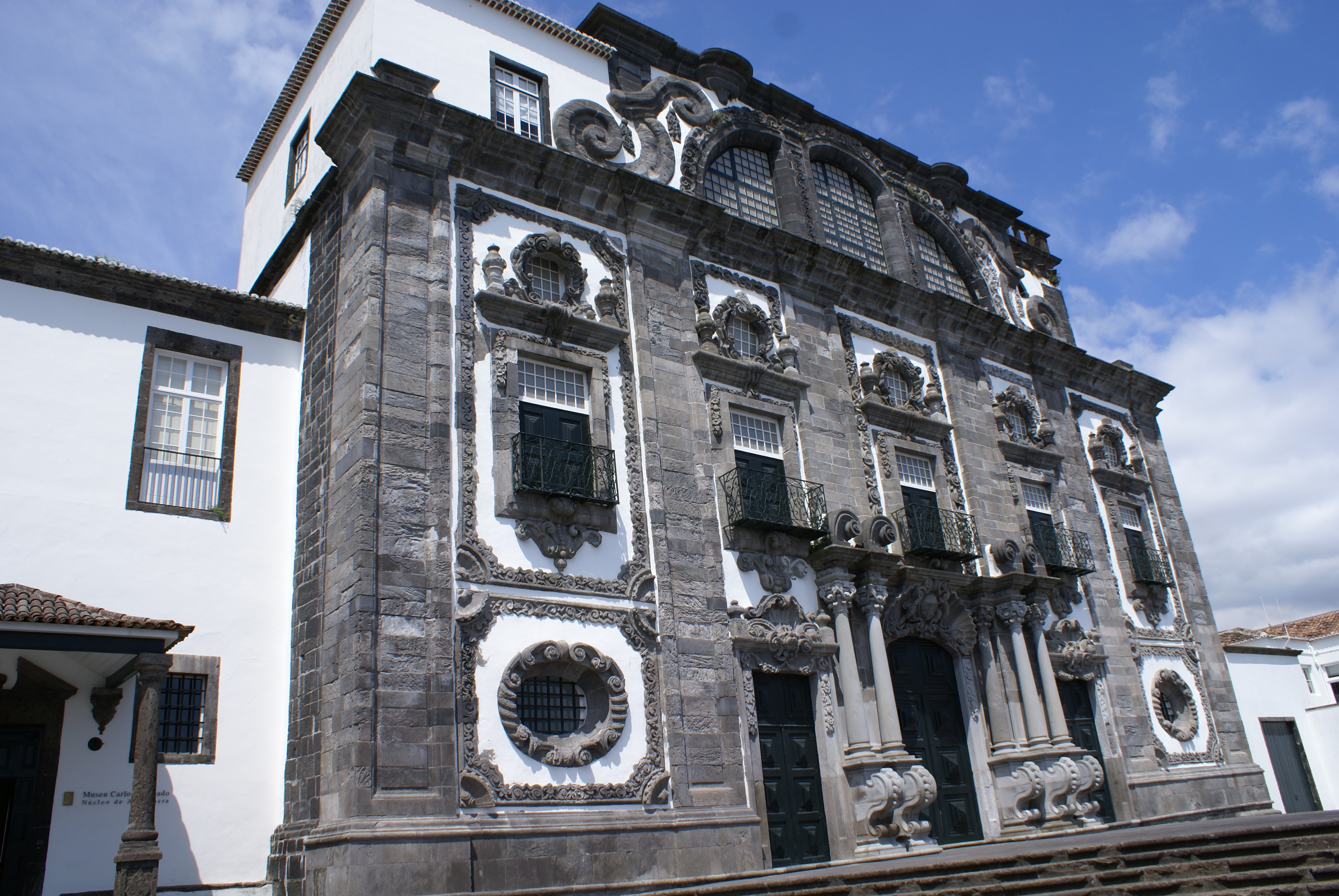
The modern façade of the College Church: reconstructed after 10 January 1637

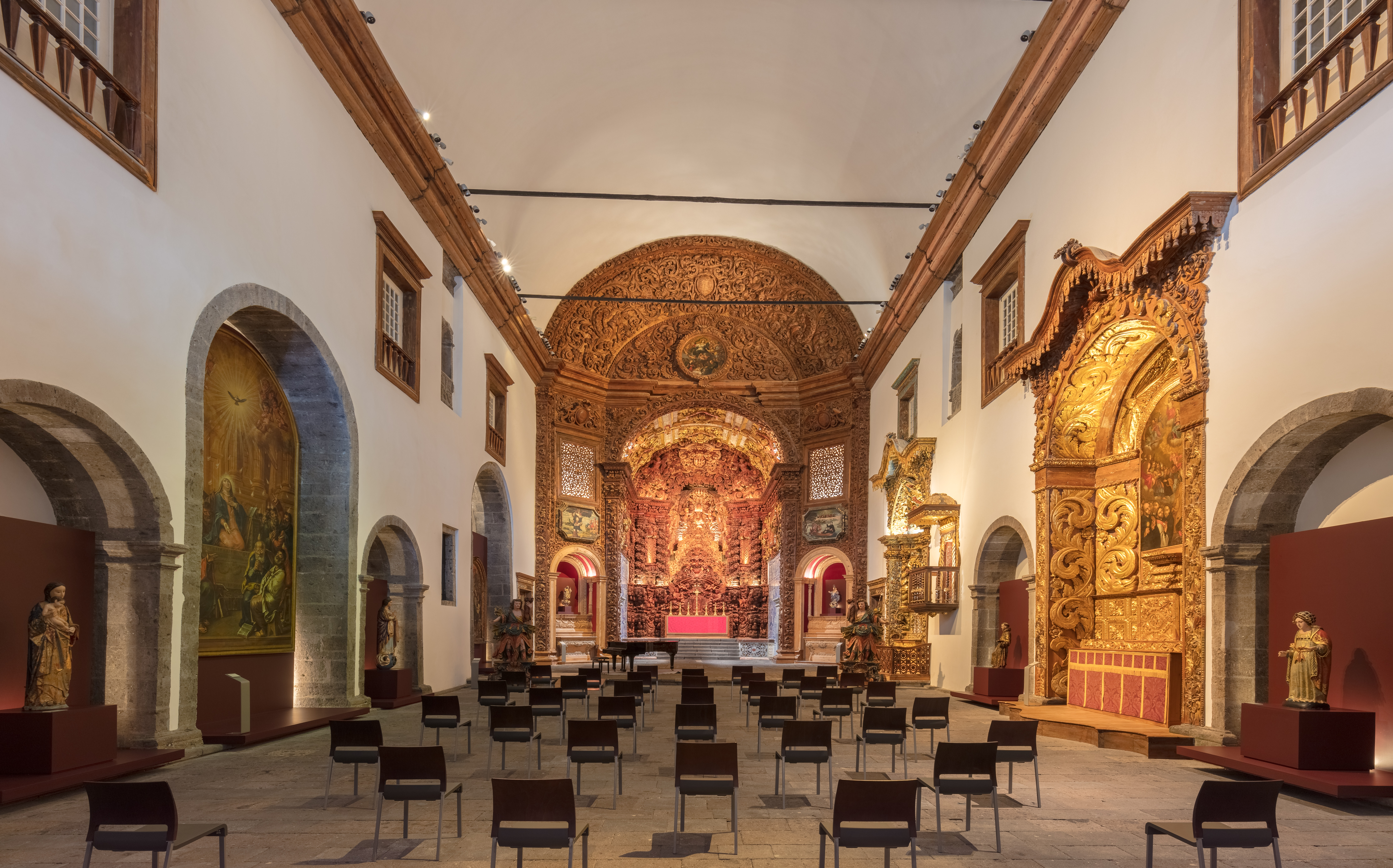
General view of the interior

The first record associated with the College Church came from a deed on 26 November 1568 by João Lopes, who willed a 20-year allotment of 30 móios of wheat to the Company of Jesus, until such time a college was founded. A similar proposal was made by the College of São Lourenço in Porto, and later Grégorio Afonso provided one moio of wheat in his testament of 23 March 1572. The first Jesuits arrived in Angra do Heroísmo on 1 July 1570, two priests then travelled to São Miguel between August and September of the same year.

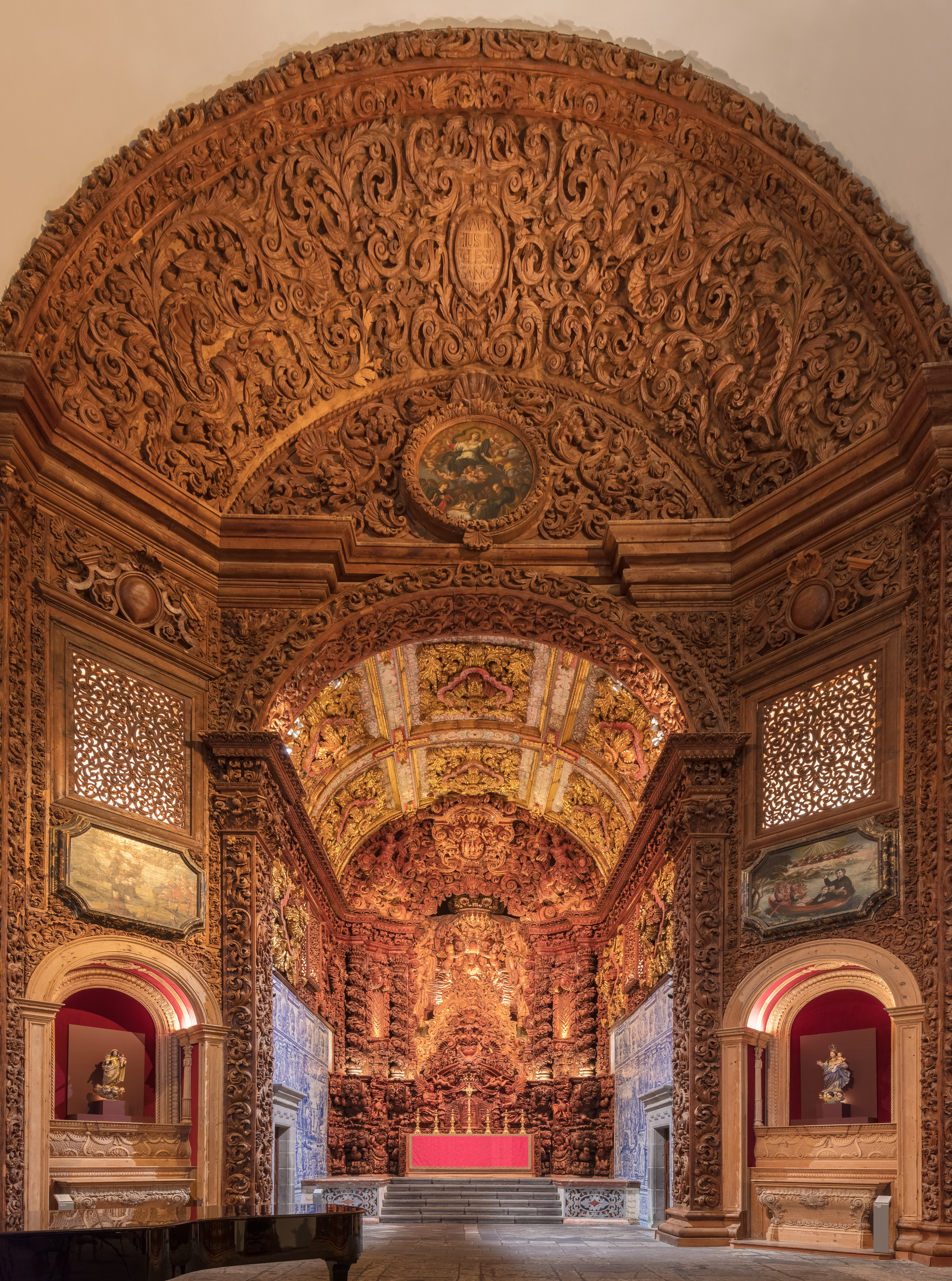
Main altar

Three priests travelling to Angra between 1572 and 1573 were forced to shelter in São Miguel. They were collected by João Lopes, who offered them shelter, while urging them to remain in Ponta Delgada in order to found a college on the island. But, it was only in about 1588 when João Lopes was able to help begin constructing the building; he acquired various houses around the current location, paying between 700$000 and 800$000 réis, while Manuel da Costa offered other buildings.

=== College ===
In January 1591, the residences for the college of Todos os Santos (all saints) were founded, and donated to the municipal government. At this time, Francisco Rodovalho donated eight alqueires of land alongside the college, João Moreira a few houses (which were destroyed for the construction), and the Quinta da Fajã was purchased for the college by João Lopes, Gaspar do Rego de Sousa and Francisco do Rego de Sá, in order provide an economic base to support the institution. The first cornerstone was erected on 1 December 1592 by the local governor, Gonçalo Vaz Coutinho on All Saints Day. Later that year the first prelate of the residence, Father Fernão Guerreiro, was appointed to the college, and the institution first opened on 1 November. On 28 February 1593, the Church of Todos os Santos was first inaugurated.

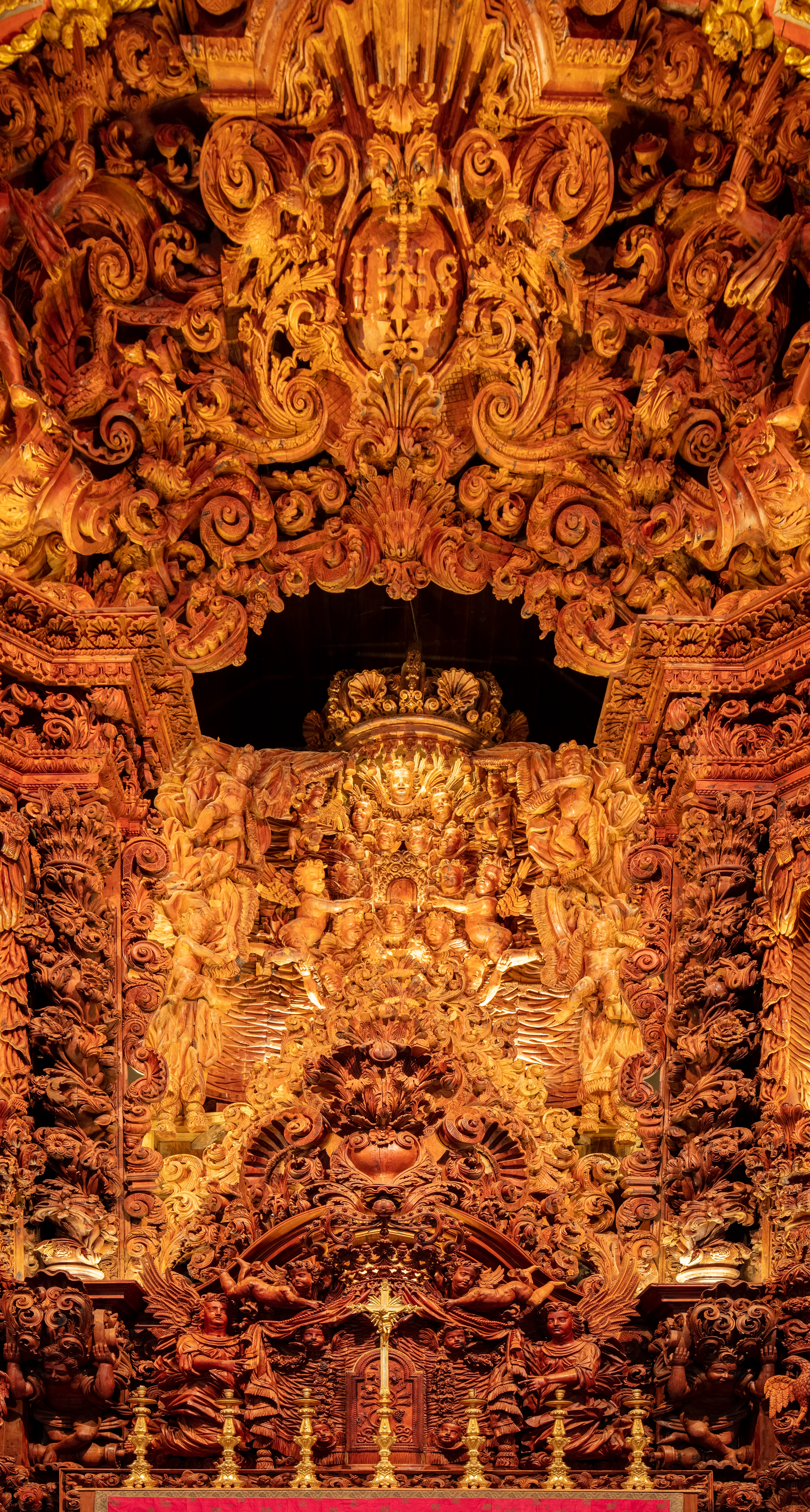
Detail of the altar

But, by 1597, a proposal to close the college had been addressed (which remained operational), yet, in 1600, the municipal government requested that the college provide classes in Latin for the island. This was accomplished in Ribeira Grande during the 17th century, when a school for Latin and Moral Theology was opened.

Starting in 1623 the second-floor of the college was constructed (completed in 1627), the college also purchased theQuinta da Grimanesa in Fajã de Cima, where a house and cistern was constructed. Shortly later (13 September 1625), the historian Agostinho de Monte Alverne indicates that the church was also renovated.

The establishment of the Confraria de Nossa Senhora da Vida (Brotherhood of Our Lady of Life) by the officials of the city in 1625, allowed the gold-leafing of the retable in the church and the purchase of an image from Lisbon. This was followed by the founding of the Confraria dos Estudantes (Brotherhood of Students) on 5 July 1625. On 2 January 1629, Captain-General Rodrigo Lobo da Silveira, petitioned the general company for the authority to create the Confraria de Santo Inácio (Brotherhood of Saint Ignatius), and ordered two paintings of the Saint for the Church. But, in 1630, with the transferring of the Captain-General to Lisbon, the rector (Father Luís Lopes) dissolved the Brotherhood. Later, another brotherhood, the Confraria of São Francisco Xavier was established in 1632, and joined with the brotherhood of Nossa Senhora da Anunciada (becoming the patron saint of the municipality) and supported by an annual 5$000 réis festival. By 1636, the college began operating with its own rector, until this time it was overseen by the bishopric of Angra.

The church was reconstructed in the first half of the 17th century, taking on the design and grandeur now recognizable. On 10 January 1637, owing to its early construction in wood (the columns specifically), a new church was begun to replace the original college church (although there was no record of its completion). The retable in the interior was completed between 1643 and 1646. At one point a small hermitage (called the Portuguese: Ermitério das Furnas) was also built around 1639 (with no vestiges), and later (1643) the Company of Jesus constructed another hermitage dedicated to Nossa Senhora de Belém (Our Lady of Bethlehem) in the vicinity (receiving houses in the locality, where they constructed a farm for rest and relaxation).

The much celebrated priest and theologian Father António Vieira celebrated mass on the feast day of Saint Teresa, on 15 October 1654 in the church, shortly before the beginning of another series of renovations (1657).

Between 1665 and 1666, the church was expanded and the current façade was completed, helped by the patronage of the local residents, such as Maria Luís who, in her 10 January will, left money for the construction for the new church (specifically the clock-tower mechanisms). Ironically, though, the clock-tower was never completed or demolished later, as was indicated by Jorge Gamboa de Vasconcelos. At this time there were eight high altars within the interior nave dedicated to: Santo Cristo (Jesus Christ), Saint Francis Xavier, Our Lady of Life, the Sacred Heart of Jesus, Our Lady of Victory, Saint Anthony of Padua, Saint Francis of Borja and Saint Stanislau.

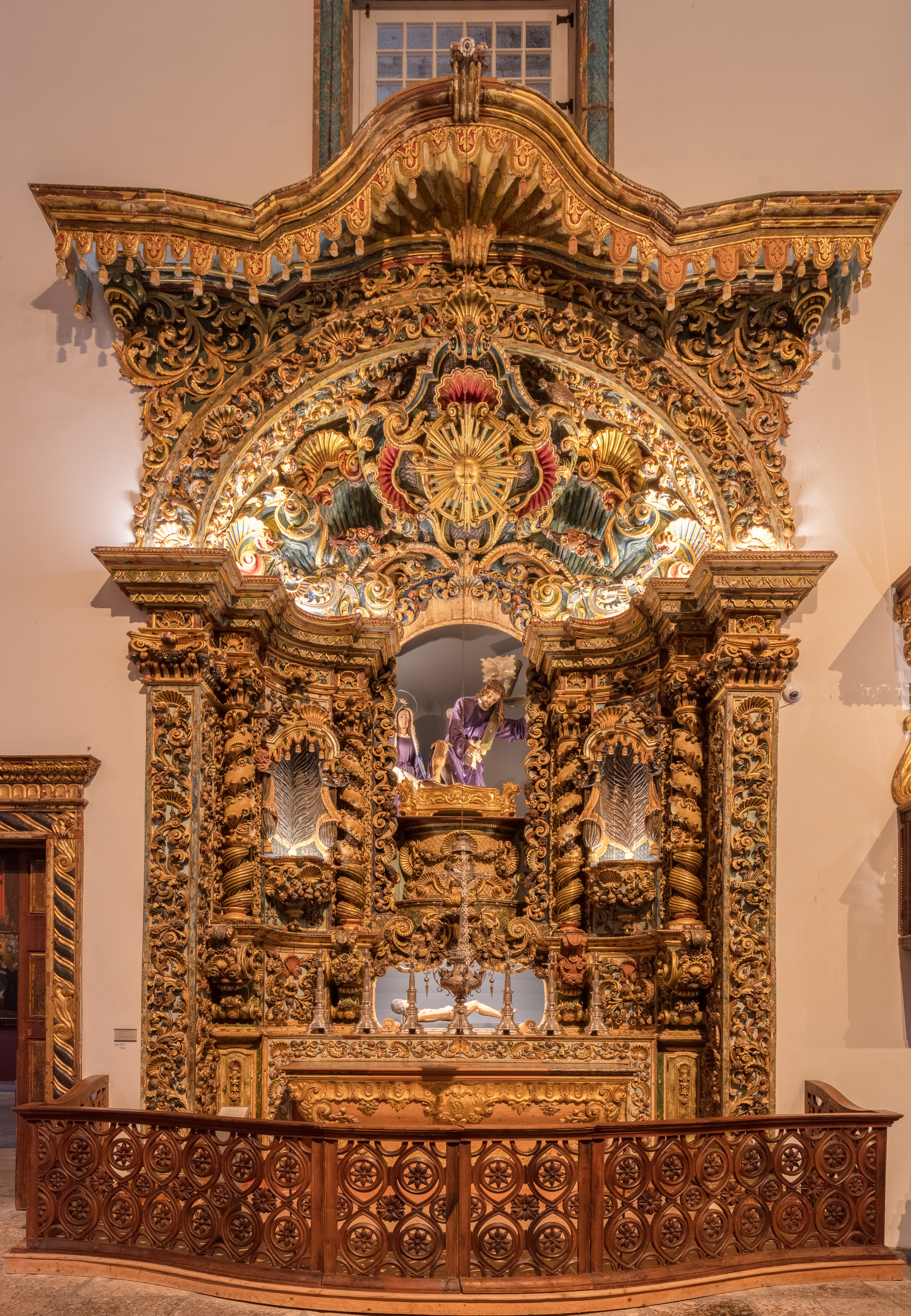
Lateral altar

On 13 July 1732, Pope Clement XII conferred on the college the institution of Santíssimo Coração de Jesus(Sacred Heart of Jesus); the complement of religious groups then included: the Brotherhood of Saint Francis Xavier, Brotherhood of the Sacred Heart of Jesus, Brotherhood of Our Lady of Victory, Brotherhood of Our Lady of Life and Brotherhood of Students.

In 1737, there were a couple of important artistic projects: the installation of the azulejo panels on the lateral walls of the main chapel, attributed to Bartolomeu Antunes; and the restoration of the main façade, owing to a 400$000 gift received from the estate of José Araújo Cerqueira (the façade would not be completed at the time of the expulsion of the Jesuits). Two years later, though, there was a secondary expansion of the church that also included remodelling of the front façade.

=== Jesuit expulsion ===
With the crisis caused by the Marquess of Pombal's expulsion of the religious orders from Portugal (as a result of the attempted assassination of King Joseph I of Portugal), the Jesuit school was vacated and classes discontinued on 23 June 1759. This was followed, on 4 July 1760, by the expulsion of the Company of Jesus, and although the church remained open for worship (its maintenance secured by the Fazenda Real, or Royal Estates), an inventory of the college's property was collected for sale and the antiquities within the college were dispersed. It was in the library of the college that some of the important documents in the history of the Azores were found, including the original manuscript for Saudades da Terra by Gaspar Frutuoso. During this latter part of the 18th century, the Marquess of Angeja and his family supported the local community and provided liturgical teaching in the vacuum of religion.

A rich merchant, Nicolau Maria Raposo do Amaral, indicated his interest in acquiring the property of the Jesuits, since he already maintained a fish salting business on the property and wanted to secure his property and chattel from constant theft. Between 1765 and 1768, the college was repaired by master mason João Ferreira and carpenter José Martins. The lands and property encircling the college were eventually acquired by Felícia Tomásia Pim da Câmara, and Nicolau Maria Raposo do Amaral for 1,920$000 réis, excluding the college church in July 1787. One of Nicolau Maria Raposo's first actions was to destroy the old cistern to make a water tank with bench, as his family occupied the property converting the Jesuit retreat into personal household.

By 1800, the church was opened by Erário Régio, yet only five lateral retables of the original ten remained intact.

The church was sold to the State on 14 August 1834, in a public sale, after a period where it was abandoned.

=== 20th century ===
The buildings of the college served successively as a storage space, a stonemason's shop, and finally to warehouse materials used in civil construction projects for the regional authority. It was finally left abandoned in 1960.

The church found new life after 1 January 1911, when the landowner José Maria Raposo do Amaral (son of Nicolau Maria Raposo do Amaral) paid to have masses celebrated every Sunday. The first mast celebrated after the 5 October 1910 Revolution was held by monsignor José Gomes. Finally, the owners of the Church, namely Maria Clotilde Raposo de Amaral Viveiros and Maria das Mercês Fisher Berquó Poças Falcão, donated the Church to the Câmara Municipal of Ponta Delgada in 1969, after the refusal of the Diocese of Angra.

In 1974, the municipal government petitioned the DGEMN to reconstruct the clock-tower, and demolish a pre-existing annex used by a shipowner (who had constructed his offices here since it offered a clear view of the sea, allowing him to prepare his ships for loading/unloading). The proposal was submitted to the Direcção-Geral de Assuntos Culturais (General Directorate on Cultural Issues). While the church was given from the city government to the Regional Government in 1977, it wasn't until 1993 before the first modern renovations were started by theSecretaria Regional de Educação e Cultura (Regional Secretariate for Education and Culture). During these recuperations a tunnel staircase and room was discovered partially destroyed in the main courtyard, which was the accessway and older cistern destroyed when Nicolau Maria Raposo's family occupied the land.

In October 1995 a project to completely consolidate the church, sacristy, ante-sacristy and small area of the historical college, was begun by A2P-Consult, under the supervision of the Laboratório Regional de Engenharia(Engineering Regional Laboratory), and on 21 September 2001 the Biblioteca Pública e Arquivo de Ponta Delgada(Ponta Delgada Public Library and Archive) occupies one of the buildings. This space was augmented in 2004, with a museum designation (to handle its permanent collection) and a 550 million Euro face-lift, that was official inaugurated on 20 August 2004. Since 2004, this space has held the permanent collection of religious art belonging to the Carlos Machado Museum, including the painting A Coroação da Virgem by Vasco Pereira Lusitano (1535–1609).

In 2008, the grande organ bay Dinarte Machado was installed in its main nave, and inaugurated by Ton Koopman.

== Architecture ==
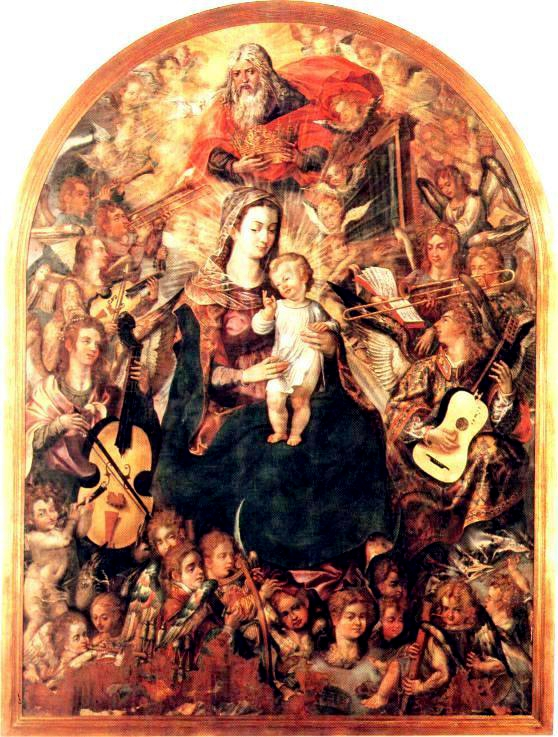
A Coroação da Virgim by Vasco Pereira Lusitano, on display in the old church

The church is situated in the Largo Marquês do Pombal (commonly referred to as the Largo do Colégio), on the northside of Rua Dr. Aristedes Moreira da Mota, east of Antero Quental Garden (Portuguese: Jardim Antero de Quental), less than 0.5 kilometres north of the historical centre of Ponta Delgada, in the parish of São Sebastião. Composed of rectangular longitudinal nave, with narrow chapels, transept and chancel, articulated volumes and covered in tiled roof, the church's façades are plastered and painted white, covered by protruding masonry foundation and topped with friezes and cornices.

=== Exterior ===
The main façade, oriented to the south, is a symmetric design that includes two incomplete clock-towers (only the right tower is completed in the comparable architectural design) all at about the same height, divided by wide, decorated broad, padded Tuscan pilasters. The façade consists of three-storey block divided into five segments divided by iconic pilasters and cornices, with windows and doors. The main tripartite body (space around the doors), is divided into three panels, all of equal height with rounded windows surmounting a series of rounded porthole-like windows, square windowed-balconies and three portal (the main entrance being the largest). All the openings are embellished by decorative elements that include shells, cartouches and garlands, including the main doors which are flanked by six plain-shaft columns with decorative iconic capitals. On the frieze and cornice on top of this body are three thermal windows (a rounded, central and two lateral, narrow, semi-bezelled frames) divided by pilasters adorned with interlocking elements. The phytomorphic frame is decorated in vegetal elements. The two bell-tower columns have at their base a large rounded, grated-window, followed by a square veranda, surmounted by a smaller elliptical window. While the right-side bell-tower is crowned by a domed belfry with cornices and parapet with balusters.

=== Interior ===
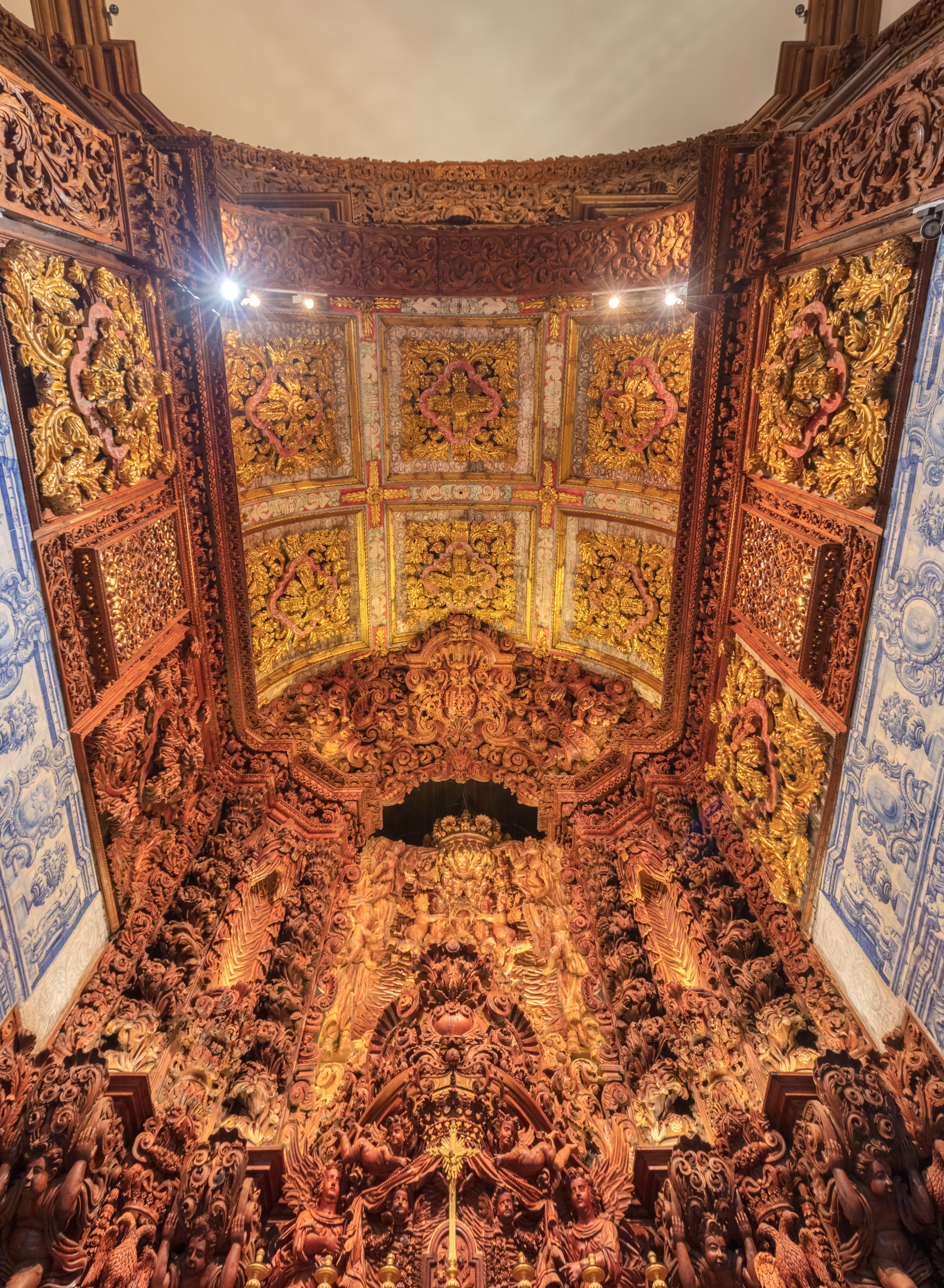
Ceiling of the altar

The nave is completed in vaulted stone, framed in wood and metal rods. The choir, which connects to the bell-tower, is supported by two decorated columns with balusters, while the sub-choir is covered by panels of azulejo with painted themes that include Indians, boats and animals.

There are four chapels, dedicated to the four evangelical saints, two of minor dimensions (probably the older confessionals) and two on the side of the epistle. Both series of chapels had rounded niches, with Tuscan pilasters, with the last two covered in gold-leaf retables. Likewise they are surmounted by three rectangulartribunas guarded by wooden balusters. On the epistle side, the pulpit, of turned, square wood balusters, is accessible from a wooden door and its covered in a decorated canopy.

The tops of the nave are truncated by two side altars with rounded arches, surmounted by two frames in low relief hiding spaces for shrines, and two tribunes protected by a lattice (coated with a profuse amount of decoration carved in acanthus). Over the rounded, triumphal arch is a medallion with a representation of the Virgin. The chancel, which is deep and quite high, is covered by a false barrel vault with six carved coffers, forming a rosetta, while the side walls are covered by woodwork and azulejos depicting two scenes: the "Transportation of the bunch of grapes from the Promised Land" (Gospel) and "fall of Manna and harvesting by Moses" (Epistle); these scenes are separated by two doors. The altar, surmounted by a concave vault, is defined by four twisted columns decorated by acanthus, and in the center, a perfect round podium adorned with carved acanthus. The set is topped by bulbous canopy, that allows the hanging of drapery between the proscenium arch, supported by angels and cherubs. Along the lateral axes of the tabernacle are awnings and drapes in semi-circular pediments, adorned with acanthus and feathers. Laterally, along the church, are corridors united at the chancel. The vestry walls are covered by azulejos.

=== Convent ===
Accessible from on the left side of the church, it is a very uncharacteristic design, built on two floors in a simple frame (a lower sill and upper balcony). The entrance is flanked by two rectangular windows in simple frame, surmounted by a porch and protected by two Tuscan columns on rectangular plinths, supporting diamond-shaped pillows and corbels. The convent, which is not accessible, actually includes several buildings and annexes occupied by the offices of the Regional Government of the Azores, and the Library and Archive of Ponta Delgada.

== See also ==
- List of Jesuit sites
