= João Teixeira =

João Teixeira may refer to:

- João Teixeira Albernaz I (died 1662), Portuguese cartographer
- João Teixeira Soares de Sousa (1827–1875), Azorean entrepreneur
- João Teixeira de Faria (born 1942), Brazilian medium, known as João de Deus
- João Victor Teixeira de Souza Silva (born 1994), Brazilian Paralympic athlete
- João Góis (born 1990), birth name João Duarte Teixeira Góis
- João Carlos Teixeira (born 1993), Portuguese footballer
- João Teixeira (footballer, born 1994), Portuguese footballer
- João Teixeira (footballer, born May 1996), Portuguese footballer
- João Teixeira (footballer, born July 1996), Andorran footballer
- João Teixeira (died 1493), chancellor of portuguese king João II
