= Velas Municipal Chamber =

Legislative body of Velas

Coordinates: 38.68119°N 28.20661°W

Velas Municipal Chamber Câmara Municipal de Velas
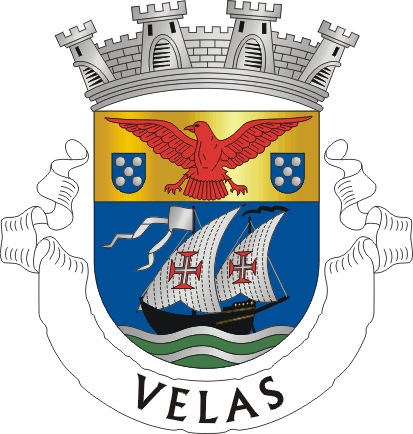
- Coat of arms of the town of Velas

Type
- Type: Câmara municipal
- Term limits: 3

History
- Founded: 1490; 536 years ago

Leadership
- President: Luís Virgílio de Sousa da Silveira, CDS since 20 October 2021
- Vice President: Marco Diocleciano Silva Almada, CDS since 20 October 2021

Structure
- Seats: 5
- Political groups: Municipal Executive (4) CDS (4) Opposition (1) PS (1)
- Length of term: Four years

Elections
- Last election: 26 September 2021
- Next election: Sometime between 22 September and 14 October 2025

Meeting place
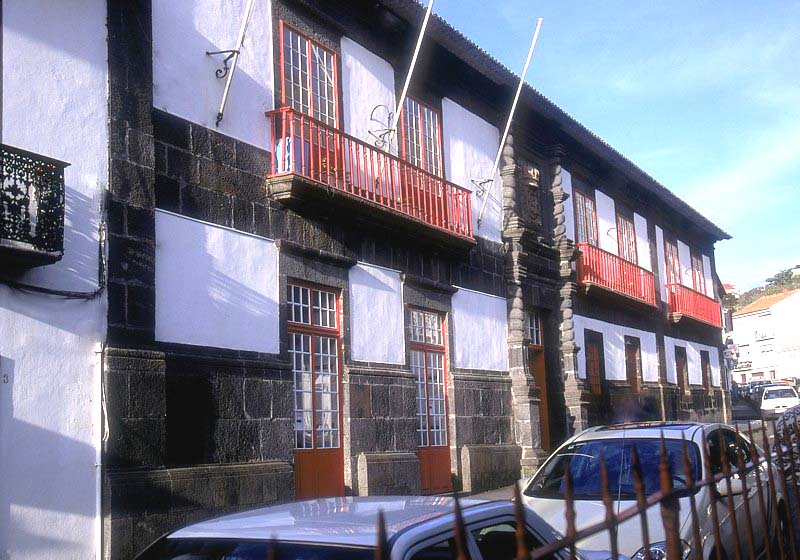
- Paços do Concelho de Velas

Website
- cmvelas.pt

The Velas Municipal Chamber (Portuguese: Câmara Municipal de Velas) is the administrative authority in the Azorean municipality of Velas. It has 6 freguesias in its area of jurisdiction and is based in the town of Velas, on the São Jorge Island. These freguesias are: Manadas, Norte Grande, Rosais, Santo Amaro, Urzelina and Velas. Despite the creation of the Câmara Municipal in 1490, the hamlet was only elevated to the status of a town in 1500.

The Velas City Council is made up of 5 councillors, representing, currently, two different political forces. The first candidate on the list with the most votes in a municipal election or, in the event of a vacancy, the next candidate on the list, takes office as President of the Municipal Chamber.

== History ==
This chamber occupies one of the most important palaces on the island of São Jorge, a building that was listed as a Property of Public Interest by Resolution no. 64/84, of 30 April, published in the Jornal Oficial, Series I, no. 14.

This building was built in the 18th century, between 1719 and 1744, and features strong, solid and imposing architecture with distinctly Baroque features.

It was built by Manuel Avelar, a member of one of the wealthiest families to live on the island of São Jorge in the 18th century. Over several generations, this powerful family built some of the most notable palaces on this island.

The building is built with a plinth made of basalt stone from the island and rests on an extensive frieze. At the entrance to the main gate, flanked by two Solomonic columns with high relief torsos, there are two doors on the left-hand side, which at the time of their initial construction were two windows, corresponding to the access space to the grain storage barn. Above the façade are the Portuguese coat of arms, engraved in natural black basalt stonework.

On the right-hand side of this imposing gate are four windows, which also belonged to the 18th century women's jail. Before this building was occupied as the municipality's town hall, the Velas courthouse was located here.

== Heraldry ==
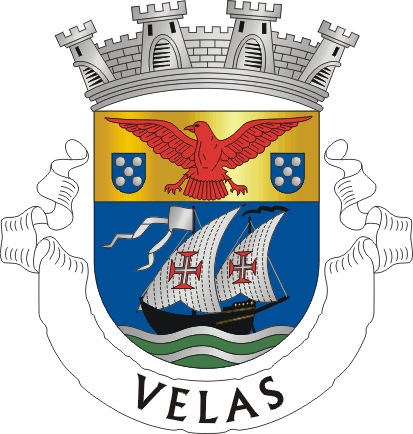
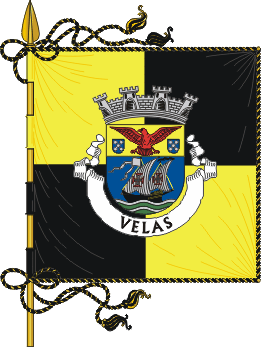
Coat of Arms and Flag of Velas

The heraldry of this council was published in the Diário do Governo n.º 174, II Série, of 27 July 1972, of the Ministry of the Interior and Directorate-General of Political and Civil Administration, 2nd Division. Approved, in accordance with the provisions of article 14 of the Administrative Code, the heraldic constitution of the arms, seal and flag of the Municipality of Velas, under the following terms:

- Coat of arms - In blue, a black caravel highlighted in gold, dressed in silver and bound in gold, with sails (velas in Portuguese) charged with crosses of the Order of Christ, vowel on three wavy bands of silver and green. The chief is gold and bears an outstretched red goshawk flanked by two quoins; the crown is silver; the stripe is white with the words “Velas” in black.
- Flag - Quartered yellow and black, gold and black cords and tassels; gold shaft and spear.
- Seal - Circular, with the pieces of the arms in the center, with no indication of the enamels. Around it, in concentric circles, the words “Câmara Municipal de Velas”.

== List of the Presidents of the Municipal Chamber of Velas ==
- Miguel Teixeira Soares de Sousa
- José Pereira da Cunha da Silveira e Sousa
- José Pereira da Cunha da Silveira e Sousa Júnior
- Joaquim José Pereira da Silveira e Sousa
- João Pereira da Cunha Pacheco – (1856–1857)
- António José Pereira da Silveira e Sousa
- José Silveira Goulart
- Fernando Mesquita – (196?-1974)
- Carlos Alberto Ferreira da Silva – (1974)
- António Teles de Lima da Silveira Loureiro – (1974–1982)
- António Frederico Correia Maciel – (1982–1993)
- António José Bettencourt da Silveira – (1993–2009)
- Manuel Soares da Silveira – (2009–2013)
- Luís Virgílio de Sousa da Silveira – (2013–2025)
