= José Cândido da Silveira Avelar =

- Born: c. 1843; Velas (Azores), Kingdom of Portugal
- Died: 3 December 1913 (aged 69–70); Angra do Heroísmo (Azores), Portugal
- Occupation: Administrator/Secretary
- Writing career
- Language: Portuguese
- Period: 1902
- Genres: History, Geography, Ethnography
- Subject: Azores
- Notable work: Ilha de S. Jorge (Açores) - Apontamentos para a sua História

José Cândido da Silveira Avelar (1843 in Velas – 3 December 1905, in Horta), was an Azorean historian and author, known for his work on the history of the island of São Jorge.

He was a secretary/writer within administrative council of Velas by 1881, and for political or intellectual reasons, had a sustained disagreement with João Duarte de Sousa.

Both men disagreed on the histrography of the island of São Jorge, and following Sousa's publication of a treasties on the island, Avelar published his Ilha de S. Jorge (Açores): Apontamentos para a sua História. His reference, published in 1902, is considered a more comprehensive and definitive interpretation of the island's history and ethnography.

He died three years later on 3 December 1905, in Horta, on the island of Faial.

== Published work ==
- Ilha de S. Jorge (Açores) - Apontamentos para a sua História (São Jorge Island (Azores)), Horta, (1902).
