= São Jorge Airport =

São Jorge Airport Aerodrómo de São Jorge
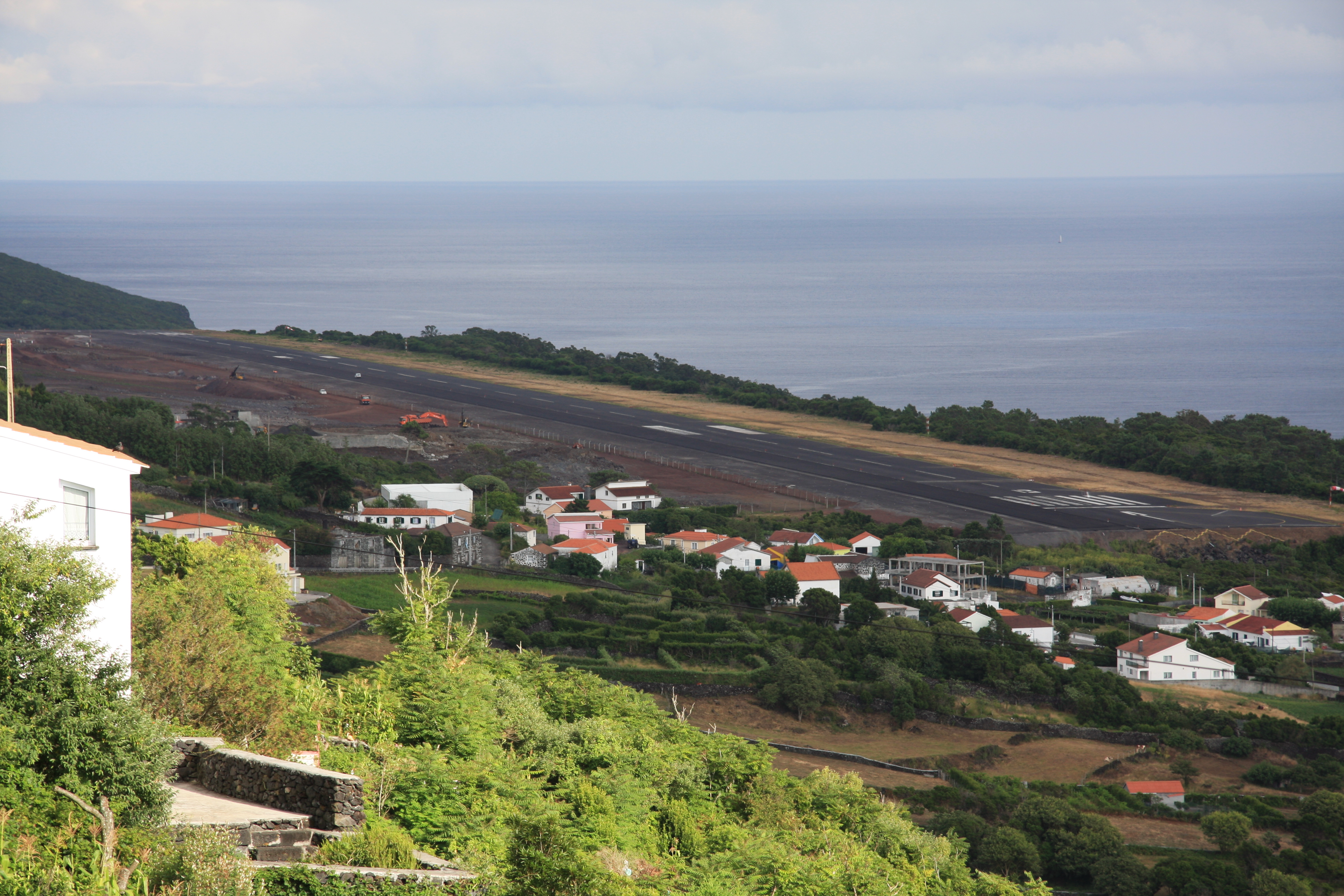
- IATA: SJZ; ICAO: LPSJ

Summary
- Airport type: Public
- Owner: Azores
- Operator: SATA Aerodromos Lda.
- Serves: Velas, Azores
- Location: Santo Amaro
- Opened: 23 April 1983
- Elevation AMSL: 335 ft (102 m)
- Coordinates: 38°39′55″N 28°10′29″W

Map
- Location of the aerodrome of São Jorge, relative to the archipelago of the Azores

Runways
Direction	Length		Surface
Direction	m	ft	Surface
13/31	1,270	4,167	Asphalt
- Source: Portuguese AIP GCM Google Maps SkyVector

São Jorge Airport (Portuguese: Aérodromo de São Jorge) (IATA: SJZ, ICAO: LPSJ) is the only airport of the island of São Jorge, situated in the civil parish of Santo Amaro, municipality of Velas in the Azores.

The airport is on the edge of Fajã da Queimada, along the southern coast, situated 6 km (3.7 mi) southeast of Velas and 28 km (17 mi) northwest of Calheta.

== Airlines and destinations ==
The following airlines operate regular scheduled and charter flights at São Jorge Airport:

Airlines	Destinations
SATA Air Açores	Ponta Delgada, Terceira

== See also ==
- List of airports in Portugal
- Transport in Portugal
- Aviation in the Azores
