= Vulcão da Urzelina =

Volcano in Portugal

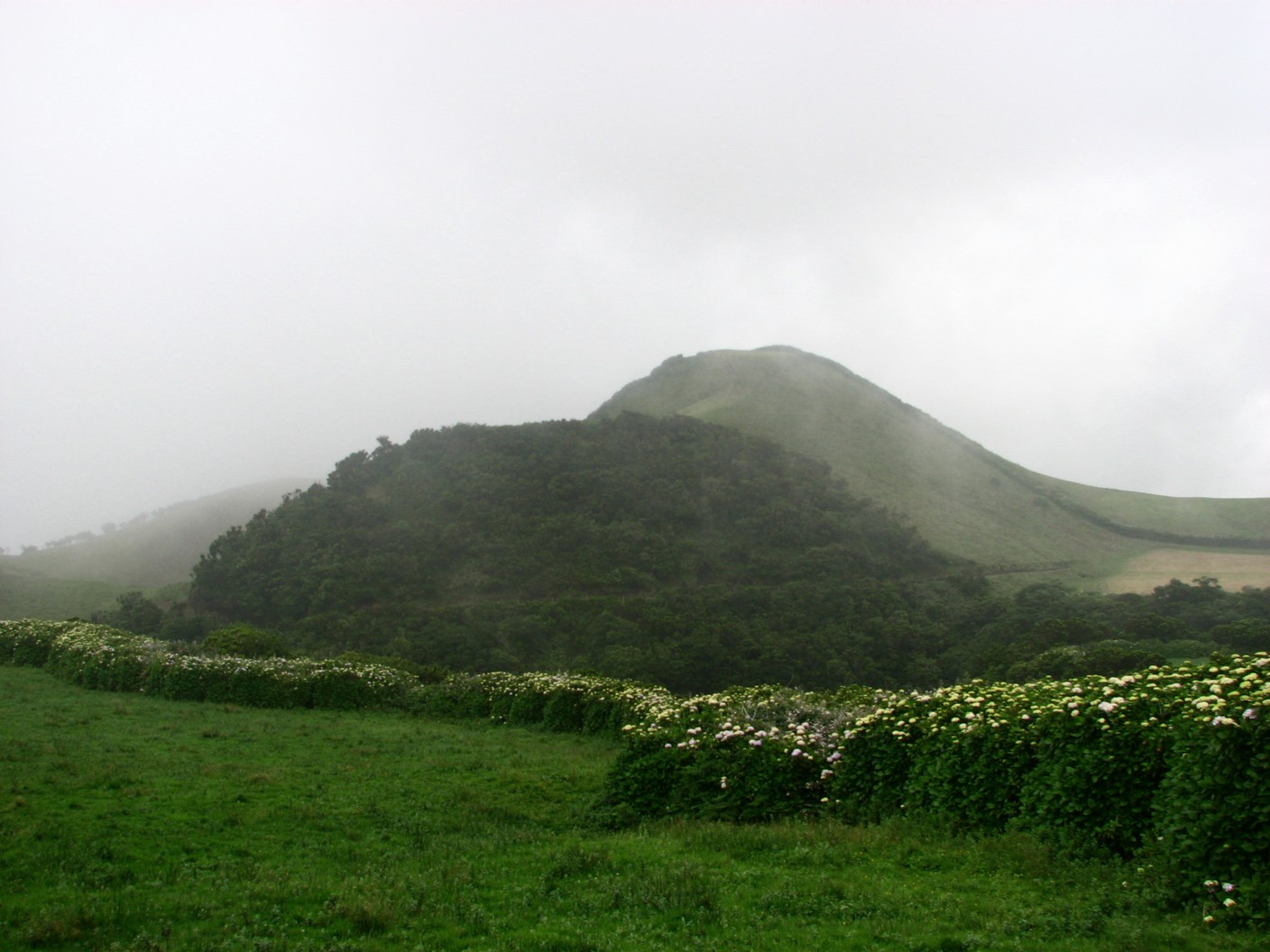
- The volcanic cone that, today, marks the main eruptive center of the 1808 Urzelina volcano, Velas, São Jorge

Highest point
- Elevation: 767 m (2,516 ft)
- Listing: Volcanic Fissural System of Manadas
- Coordinates: 38°40′03″N 28°07′19″W

Naming
- Language of name: Portuguese

Geography
- Location within Azores
- Location: Velas, São Jorge, Azores
- Parent range: Mato da Urzelina

Geology
- Mountain type: Cone
- Last eruption: 1808

Climbing
- Easiest route: Scramble, Class 2; YDS Grade II

Vulcão da Urzelina is a volcano near the civil parish of Urzelina, Velas municipality, São Jorge Island, Azores.

It erupted in May and June 1808, causing destruction and over 30 deaths in Urzelina and producing a basalt field of volcanic rock extending to the Ponta da Urzelina. The eruption was the last sub-aerial event observed in the Azores; most recent eruptions have occurred along submarine vents, with the Capelinhos eruption (1957–58) starting as a submarine eruption (that eventually grew into a sub-aerial event) and the 1998–2001 Serreta eruption being exclusively submarine (never breaking the surface).

Bocas de Fogo or Bocas de Fogo da Urzelina is a colloquial name of the volcano used only locally, but it is neither used in science nor in administrative maps.

== Eruption ==
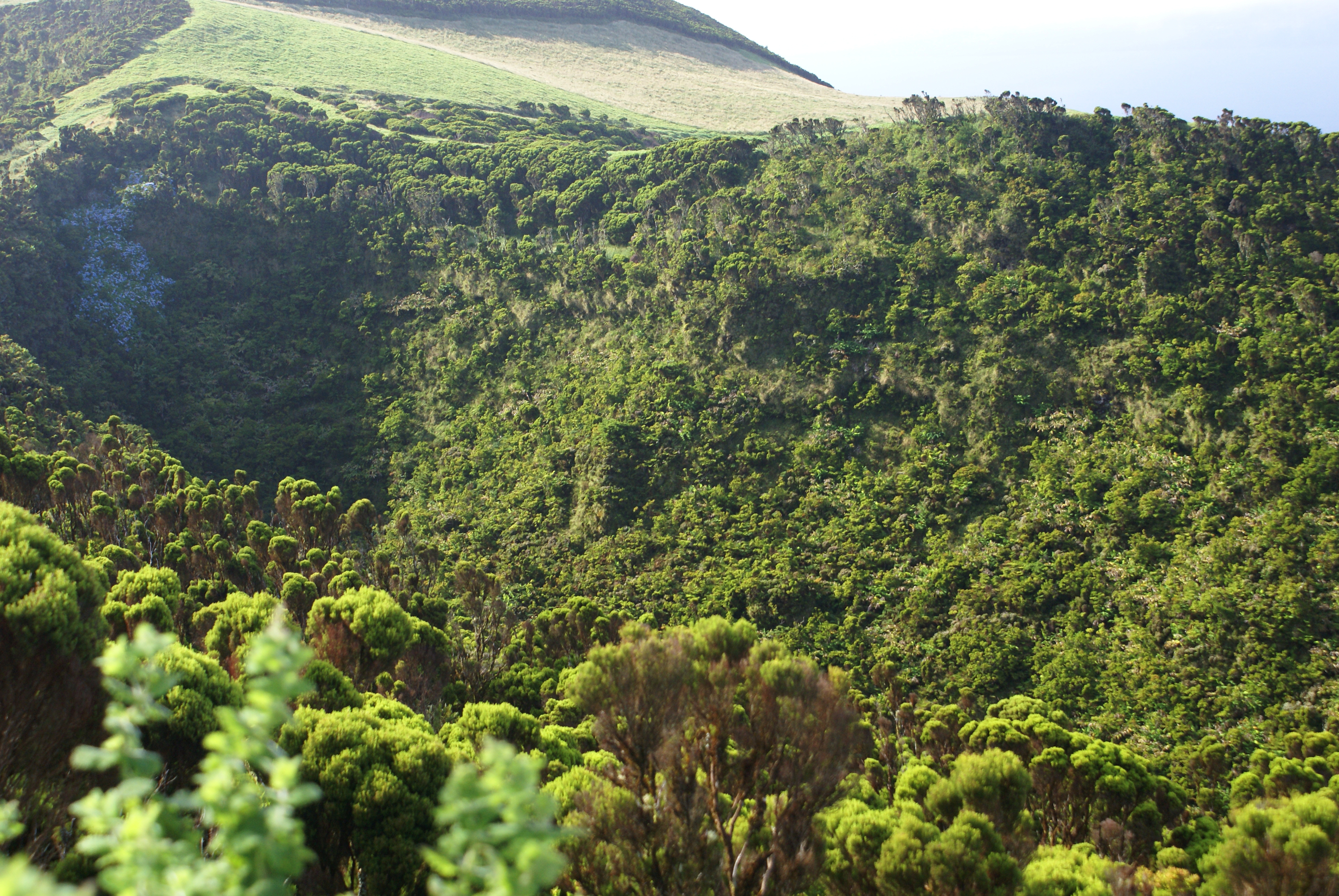
Close-up of the Urzelina crater, referred to as the Bocas de Fogo da Urzelina

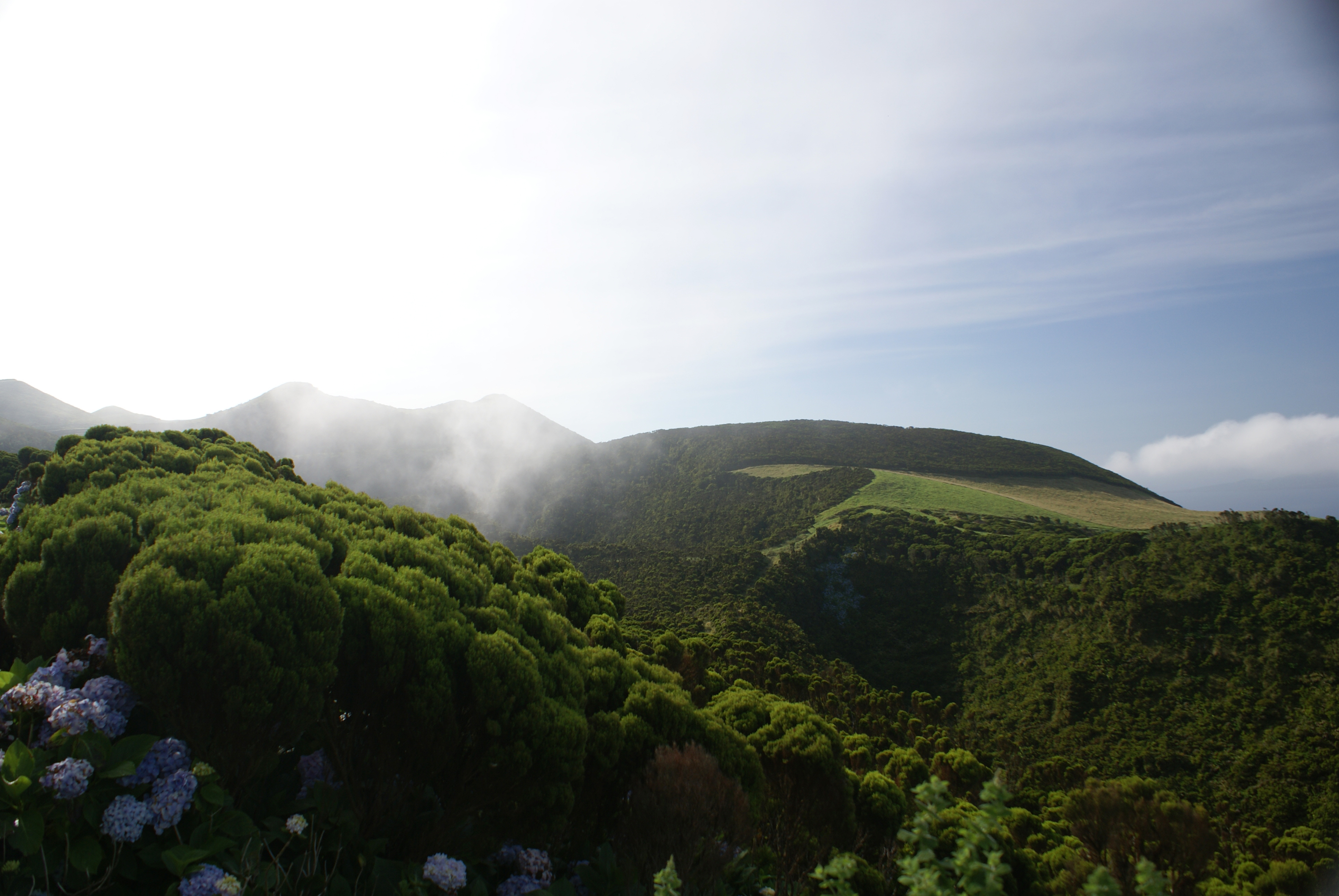
The main cone on a misty morning; on a similar morning in 1808 it was the main focus of the magma chamber

In the late morning of May 1, 1808, after a few days of intense seismic activity (that produced approximately eight tremors per hour), a fissural eruption occurred in the foothills of Manadas. Its eruption, which also affected other districts, was followed by gaseous emanations and lava flows that caused several deaths and destruction in the parish of Urzelina.

The events of the eruptions were reconstructed from various descriptions after the event, the most significant coming from Father João Ignácio da Silveira, parish priest of Santo Amaro. From these accounts, he wrote of a "great cloud of fire" that grew above the parish of Urzelina which was followed by abundant ash showers:

On the early morning of Good Pastor Sunday, the first day of the month of May of the present year 1808, the earth shook so frequently, that we counted about eight tremors per hour, and of these there was one near sunrise so big, that it woke the population from their beds. On the same day, with part of the people in the Church supplicating themselves to Our Lord God, there was another earthquake that caused the assembled people to flee the Church, from 11 to 12 of the same day there were other earthquakes, and closely a sound so loud...and quickly we saw arise a great cloud of smoke over the tallest mountain of the parish of Urzelina, on the peak of António José de Sequeira, and in front of the Church of São Matheus, whose plan is central to the parish and was the most pleasing on the island, and for that reason it is visited by many good and bad people of all the islands, and in a short time it covered the highest sky made an arc over the parish of Manadas and of Urzelina...

From the mouth of that volcano existed roars so great and trembling without interval that it invited the inhabitants of this island to Judgment. The people ran to suplicate themselves to God, quickly the people of the parish of Urzelina were afraid and abandoned their vicar the Reverend José António de Barcellos in the sacristy of his church, and in the same day it rained so much sand that the homes in the headlands were covered with sand and the fields there remained with [a thickness] of 7 palms [height], and the vineyards of the Castelletes until the chapel of Santa Rita, in the parish of Manadas, remained fixed and the homes almost collapsed with the weight, immediately escaping tongues of fire from the center that reached the heavens, throwing ignite rocks to 8 palms, to a distance of four leagues, others of 16 palms or less, rose to the same height and fell in dense showers.

Arriving the tragic evening, it dis-animated the inhabitants of this island to see the fire and ignite rocks, that escaped as meteors and almost looked like they fell over the people, and the windows of the church almost appeared to break with the echoes of the sound that threatened our life.

Until Tuesday, third day of the same month, there exploded fire from seven places, placing the mouht of the volcano close to Ribeira do Arieiro, by afternoon the fires had abated: in the morning of Wednesday, fourth day of the same month, there exploded a fire between Ribeiras, above Fajã's spring, and with the same luck, it created a cloud of sulforous powder and dirt that appeared to burn that location.

The vicar of Urzelina quickly made a procession to the area of the fajã with [the image] of Senhor Santo Christo and Nossa Senhora das Dôres, eventually meeting Father José de Sousa Machado, who brought a procession with Nossa Senhora da Encarnação and various people, who were almost suffocated by the sulfurous powder that was falling. Joining that animated procession, they arrived at the chapel of Nossa Senhora do Desterro, and still, with a lot of effort, because at the intersection to the top, there fell much sulphur and the air was sticky that many trees fell with their weight, while its character affected the travellers.

After another seven days, a fire exploded in the vicinity of the parish of Santo Amaro, where it opened two mouths of fire, such as two great ravines of fluid material, and with such force that on the second day, we encountered more than a moio of fields of lava in the direction of the homes, forcing the people to flight, the vicar, Rev. Amaro Pereira de Lemos, lost his senses and sister D. Anna Maria de Lemos, went crazy.

The Vicar of Velas and Confessor, the Rev. António Machado Teixeira, upon the fire reaching the village was worried that they should leave, and ordered that the Sacrament should be sent to Beira, resulting in an abandonment [of the area] that could not be explained. The nuns went to the Church in Rosais; the Confessor and other clergy to Faial, the Judge to Pico and most of the people, almost the entire village, went to Beira and Rosais. This movement was beyond necessity, because on the day they did, those who saw the fire noted that they barely ran, and mostly within the ravines

The hinterland where the mentioned fire passed remained beaten and the grottoes formidable, the road broken in a manner that there did not pass cars nor people.

A similar account was described by João Soares de Albergaria de Sousa, in the quasi-political document Corografia Açórica:

The volcano of 1808, that we witnessed erupt from Lagoinhas, along the massif that lies to the north of the village of Urzelina, also expelled from the locality of d'Entre Ribeiras, a league to the north-west of that area and then later in the area of Areias; the first tongue expelled for many days great quantities of material: for seven days the sun was obscured from the density in the atmosphere, impregnated with volcanic vapors; there were ash showers; the island suffered many and violent concussions; the soil in the neighborhood of the volcano opened deep cracks; these faults opened in areas 88-132 centimeters. This volcano ran to the sea, without interruption, leaving the ground covered in lava to a height of 990 centimeters, approximately.

The volcanic activity continued until May 4, from several points above Urzelina, migrating to as far as 1.5 kilometres (0.93 mi) towards the direction of Entre Ribeiras. The parish of Santo Amaro was also affected on May 11, when two craters in the area of Areias began expelling lava which forced the evacuation of the population.

=== Pyroclastic flows ===
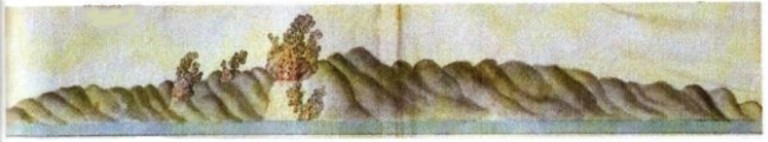
A view from the island of Faial during the 1808 eruption, showing the eruptive places and images of pyroclastic flows descending the cliffs of Manadas

Fifteen days after the initial eruption, explosive activity occurred again above Urzelina. This new episode was accompanied by the production of lava that destroyed a great part of the parish, fostering gas clouds and nuée ardente that caused the death of thirty people, as described by João Teixeira Soares:

The volcanic activity ceased, but gradually; the craters smoked still for many days, and for many years it was perceptible near the faults...a major elevation in the temperature, marked by Herbaceous plants that covered the soil. The lavas conserved, also, for years, sulfurous gases...Of the phenomenons that we related, that which appeared to give the most attention of the geology, was the nuée ardentes...They were laden with a humid powder or dough, making them heavy and obligated them to fall to earth, down the flanks, to the sea. It brought with it a terrible force of transference. The introduction of the lightest part into the respiratory organs caused death. An identical phenomenon appeared, as we saw, in 1580...The lava of 1808 is the most attractive that one would know in geological history. Many parts of it are already converted in branching mats. A graphic representation of the craters and lava from one or other volcano have shown notably their history and relations.

In the Revue Scientifique de la France a de l'Etranger, Ferdinand André Fouqué writing on the eruptions of 1580 and 1808 verified, in the two craters that he investigated, the implications of the pyroclastic flows:

These nuée ardente were laden with humid powder, that descended along the flanks, lightly touching the surface of the terrains. This toxic contact wilts and kills plants immediately...The asphyxiating power of these clouds, their progress close to the surface of the soil and the constant movement along the slopes indicate a principal element...the existence of a killer and dense gas, probably indicates carbonic acid. Its opacity is attributable to water vapor, mildly condensed and its reddish color, a volcanic dust, so subtle that it is dragged in a suspended mixture of gases and vapor. In the end, the actions upon the plants, prove without a doubt that chloric acid and sulfurous acid expelled in conjunction with aqueous vapors were dragged with it. The testimonies from the 1808 eruption do not refer to flames; the descriptions that were left, makes one conclude that the temperature of the nuée ardentes were low temperature.

A similar description was compiled by João Teixeira Soares, writing in the O Jorgense (numbers 21, 22 of August 15 and September 1, 1872) He was a little more specific, noting that in the timeline of the events, that around June 5, ten days after the first emissions covered the island, fumes flowed to the east and west, causing a large surge in temperatures and devastating the vegetation.

=== Poisonous gases ===
Fouque continued:

The attention paid to the eruption came principally from the excitement caused by the actions of the poisonous agents. From one narrative, probably a little exaggerated, the men and animals died because they could hardly breath those pestilent vapors.

It is evident that the 1808 nuee ardents was more humid and with temperatures below those of 1580...[in those testimonies] the clouds of that first eruption contained 'flames', likely, at least, affirming that they transported incandescent materials, and that the destructive affects were caused by the chlorific power of its natural geochemical properties, quite different from the nuees of 1808. Generally, the identification of the names given by the inhabitants, during two centuries, those singular manifestations are in fact justified for many reasons. In both cases, there was vaporous masses, opaque, filled with powdery materials, in a mass of cloud, that descended the flanks of the mountains along the surface of the soil, and that killed the plants and animals. The existence of "flames" in the 1580 nuee ardente is more suspicious, because, with much difficulty, if we understand gases, whose combustion produces flames, they can travel along, in open air, without becoming inflamed. Admitting also, that there occurred a considerable difference in temperatures of the nuee ardentes in both eruptions, we can not find in this unique fact enough differences to indicate two phenomenons that are absolutely distinct. The chlorific affects described were presented by inexperienced observers: the situation in these places where they were produced, the distance more or less distant from the emission points, the variable rapidity of the volcanic nuee, the climatic conditions particular of the atmosphere in the time of each eruption, and many other things, could still modify considerably the diverse intensity of the actions taken by the heat events. It stands to reason the witnesses of the 1808 eruption...

Similar phenomenons appear near other volcanoes, but maybe in part, some of the nuee ardents traveled better than the two eruptions in São Jorge. I insist much more in my examination, because they appear to furnish a key to a few problems discovered in the exhumations of Pompeii...The strange situation of the skeletons discovered in the middle of the roads of the Roman volcanic necropole, is very difficult to explain, in the major part of the cases, invoking primarily the analogy of the phenomenons that we observed in the modern eruptions of Vesuvious. A key to the ash showers, although more abundant and laden with humidity, which for example had traveled down the earth and suffocated a man, who was found dead running down a public road, in the company of two daughters. It was necessary to include a delirious gas to kill all three in spontaneous agony...In all the lava that has flowed in the Azores, after the Portuguese arrived, the 1808, of all of them, was the most altering. The musgkee and the lichens invaded firstly, then the herbaceous vegetation implanted itself in it and in the end the bushes and the trees. Actually, certain portions are transformed in mats, while there, close to the layers of the 1580 lava, they begin to disintegrate.

These suffocating gases, which were probably carboxylic acid, were harmful to the population; the thick water-vapor, which condensed in a reddish color, rapidly spread unnoticed through the local vegetation (a mix chloric and sulfuric acids) which were expelled as aqueous vapors.

Physically, the events was centered on seven craters, in the area known as Lagoinhas, and its effects were most prominent around the area near the Church of São Mateus. The temple itself was survived by the bell-tower, which became an ex-libris for the island of São Jorge. Even following the eruption, gas emissions continued to be observed from the craters and lava flows.

=== Reactions ===
Abandoned by the civil judge, the remaining councilmen, appointed by Royal charter (December 12, 1806), Captain Amaro Teixeira de Sousa, Sargent-major José Soares de Sousa, Capitan João Ignacio da Silveira, and municipal attorney Jorge José Covilhão closed themselves off in the municipal chambers in order to concentrate on the crisis, detailing all their actions in a ledger.

Captain-General D. Miguel António de Melo, realizing the need of the islanders, ordered, in a May 18 decree, the free distribution of five moios of corn, recommending that they should plead for "divine mercy" while offering his assistance on the island, if his presence would assist their cause. In a letter dated July 23, the municipal chamber accepted the General's offer of cereal and foodstuffs, but the writer, José Félix Rodrigues Mendes, added:

...the greatest gift that your excellency could provide, with the attention of the poverty that remains on this island, is to represent to Our Royal Highness, that he abolish the militia regiment, whose body is formed by a great part of the impoverished of the fires: since the poor do not live on anything but their stipend and, even the more miserable, only appear in their tunics, without even wearing shirts: the occasion is opportune, if your excellency is willing to protect this island, to dignify and make us this the greatest of gifts.

The intent of the request was to free some serfs to assist in the reconstruction, but the Civil Governor and Captain-General, responding in an angry letter, dated October 21, were insulted by the letter's signatories, demanding that those who had signed the document should have their functions suspended (resulting in José Félix Rodrigues Mendes's suspension from the municipal chamber). Out of personal spite, the Captain-General continued that he: "...had, for similar absurdities, run to ground António Sebastião Espínola for these type of ordinary strategies...you deserve that I order your apprehension and have you arrested on my order...!!!"

=== Afterwards ===
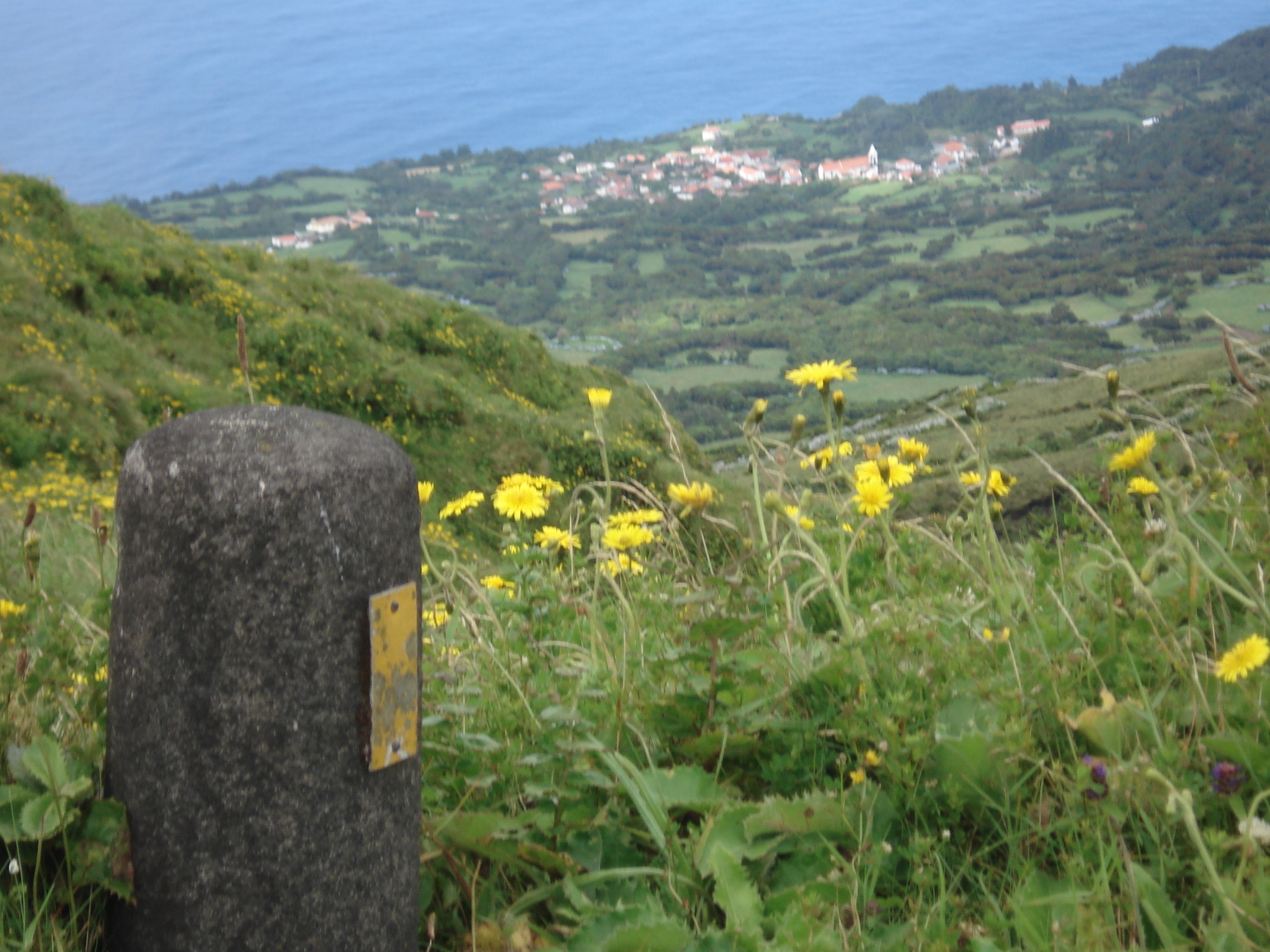
Altitude marker along the Serra de Lagoinhas, with the village of Urzelina in the distance

Over thirty people were killed as a direct consequence of the eruption, while several of the islands of the Azores were affected by ash showers (Pico, Terceira and São Miguel) from June 5 to June 10, or felt continuous earthquakes during the event (as was the case on Faial and Pico).

The several earthquakes that occurred during the events motivated officials in Horta to send personal assistance to the island; in this case a contingent of residents traveled to Velas in order to offer support and their hospitality to many of the local people affected by the crisis.

The church's parish priest, José António de Barcellos, wrote later (per the writings of João Teixeira Soares), that the event was both an act of God and divine providence, since for years he had requested assistance for the construction of a new parish, and received evasive responses. It was during the governance of Captain-General Francisco de Borja Garção Stockler, after the 1808 eruption, that he was able to raise the costs and through sacrifices, construct the new parish.

The effects of the eruption even persisted to 1810; in that year, three men were asphyxiated when they attempted to clean a salt-water pool along the Urzelina coast (which they had discovered to have been polluted with ash). During excavations made in June 1877, in addition to many ruins, the house once owned by Jorge Soares de Avelar was discovered.
