= João Duarte de Sousa =

Azorean politician, historian and writer

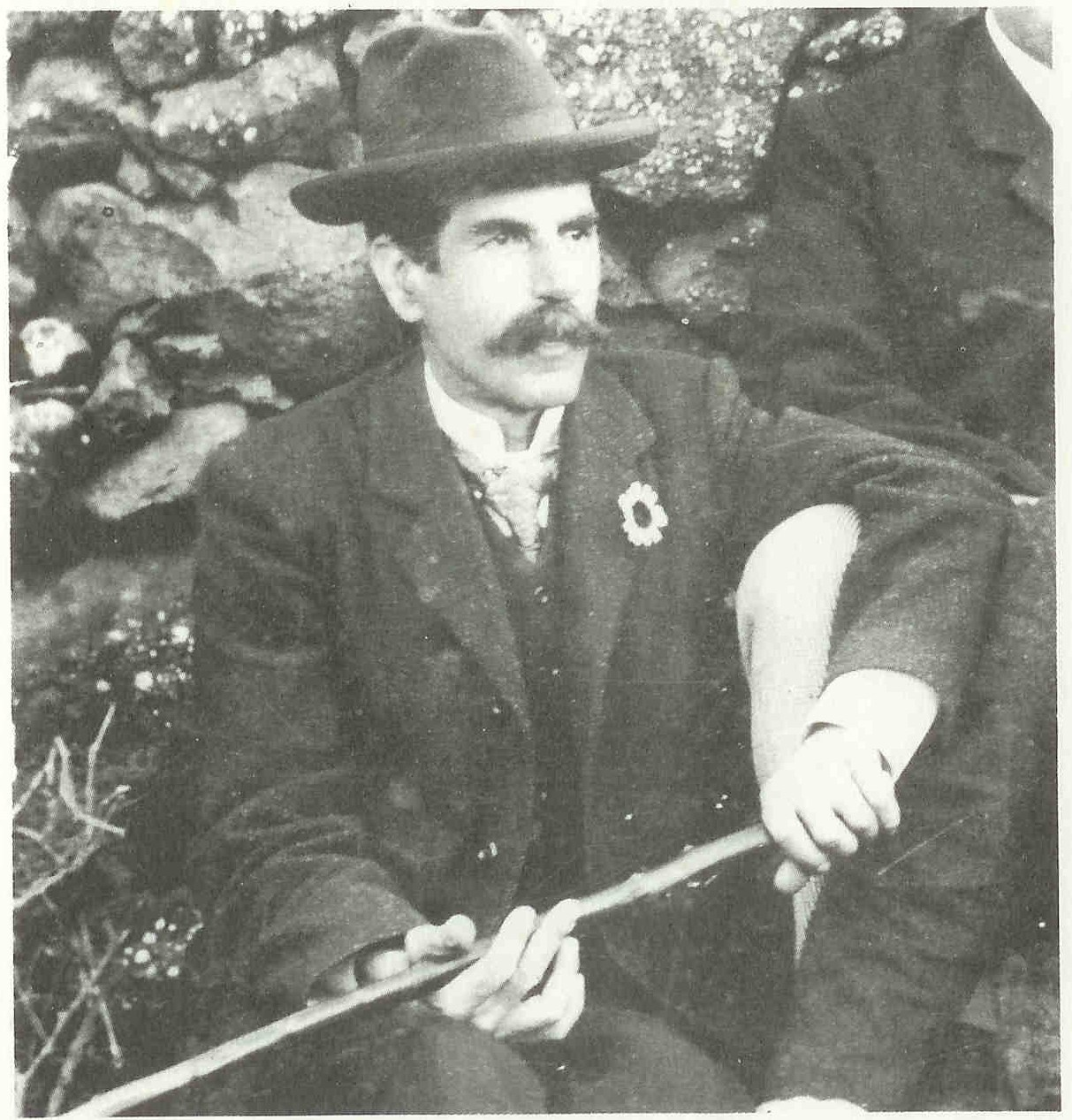
- João Duarte de Sousa (around 1890)
- Born: October 23, 1862; Velas (Azores), Kingdom of Portugal
- Died: 29 May 1909 (aged 46); Angra do Heroísmo (Azores), Kingdom of Portugal
- Occupations: Administrator, Secretary
- Spouse: Maria Carlota Rebelo
- Writing career
- Pen name: J. Duarte de Sousa
- Language: Portuguese
- Period: 1897
- Genres: History, Geography, Ethnography
- Subject: Azores
- Notable work: Ilha de São Jorge - Apontamentos Históricos e Descrição Topográfica

João Duarte de Sousa, also known as J. Duarte de Sousa, (23 October 1862 in Velas – 29 May 1909 in Angra do Heroísmo), was a Portuguese politician, historian and writer of the island of São Jorge, in the archipelago of the Azores.

João Duarte de Sousa served as a secretary in the Velas municipal hall from 1886, a post he held for 24 years. Around this time he married Maria Carlota Rebelo in Terceira, and permanently moved to Velas.

He was a political supporter of the Partido Regeneredor (Regenerator Party), and movements on the political left, eventually resulting in his dismissal in 1895. He and his wife moved to Angra do Heroísmo, before settling in Praia da Vitória where he became administrator for the municipal council. Later, he would become the Secretary of the Polícia Repressiva da Emigração Clandestina (Repressive Police for Clandestine Emigration), a post in which he was very unpopular for his political conflicts and the way in which he exercised his position of authority.

Interested in local history, he completed several investigations within the municipal archives, resulting in his published work Apontamentos Históricos e Descrição Topográfica, of which many were republished in the newspapers of São Jorge and Terceira. The publication of his book, resulted in conflict with his political adversary (and successor in the Angra do Heroísmo municipal council), the Jorgenese José Cândido da Silveira Avelar. Silveira Avelar eventually published a rival manuscript in 1902, to "correct" many of the factual errors that he found in J. Duarte de Sousa's work (demonstrating his superior skills and level of investigation).

João Duarte died in Angra do Heroísmo on 29 May 1909, at the age of 46.

== Published work ==
- de Sousa, João Duarte (1897). Ilha de São Jorge - Apontamentos Históricos e Descrição Topográfica (in Portuguese). Velas (Azores), Portugal: Câmara Municipal de Velas.
- de Sousa, João Duarte (1992). Afonso, João (ed.). Reminiscências velenses (Na Vila das Velas do século XIX) [Velense Reminiscences: On the Town of Velas in the 19th Century (posthumous edition of the Câmara Municipal de Velas (1992), with preface and updated texts by João Afonso] (in Portuguese). Velas (Azores), Portugal: Câmara Municipal de Velas.
