= SJZ =

SJZ may refer to:

- São Jorge Airport (IATA: SJZ), the only airport on the island of São Jorge in Santo Amaro, Velas, Azores
- Shijiazhuang railway station (China Railway Pinyin code: SJZ), a railway station in Hebei, China
