= João Teixeira Soares de Sousa =

Portuguese politician (1827–1875)

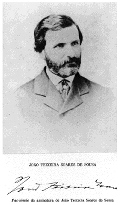
- João Teixeira Soares de Sousa (around 1870)
- Born: 12 September 1827; Velas (Azores), Kingdom of Portugal
- Died: 1 February 1875 (aged 47); Ponta Delgada (Azores), Kingdom of Portugal
- Education: University of Coimbra
- Occupations: Entrepreneur, Politician, Historian
- Relatives: Miguel Teixeira Soares de Sousa (father); Maria Angélica Soares de Albergaria (mother)
- Writing career
- Pen name: João Teixeira Soares
- Language: Portuguese
- Period: 1876
- Genres: History, Geography, Ethnography
- Subject: Azores
- Notable work: Cantos Populares do Archipelago Açorian

João Teixeira Soares de Sousa (12 September 1827 – 1 February 1875) was an Azorean entrepreneur, politician and investigator of Azorean history, anthropology, and ethnography. Born on the island of São Jorge, in the municipality of Velas, he was also referred to as João Teixeira Soares. He was a parliamentary deputy for the islands of São Jorge and Graciosa, and the author of several publications on the history of the island of São Jorge, its popular culture, folklore, proverbs, and traditional poems.

== Biography ==
Teixeira Soares was born in Velas, the son of Miguel Teixeira Soares de Sousa and Maria Angélica Soares de Albergaria. His family raised grapes and oranges in a settlement of Terreiros near his birthplace.

In October 1849, he entered the University of Coimbra on the mainland of Portugal, where he earned the Bachelor of Mathematics degree in 1853 and a Doctor of Philosophy the following year. He had begun to study medicine in 1852, but he changed his course of study.

In 1854, he returned to São Jorge where he assumed the direction of the family wine-making business.

In the Portuguese legislative elections of 1864, he was elected parliamentary deputy for the constituencies of São Jorge and Graciosa. He headed for Lisbon, where he spent much of the remainder of his relatively short life. In Lisbon, when the Parliament was not in session, in the São Bento Palace, he studied historical documents related to his native island, particularly at the National Archive of Torre do Tombo, in the Castle of São Jorge. The methodical and painstaking work involved the transcription of numerous historical documents, and the discovery of other rare references that he used in his articles on local history.

He met Teófilo Braga, who would, much later, become the Prime Minister of Portugal. A fellow Azorean, Braga shared Teixeira Soares's passion for folklore and other aspects of traditional culture. Together, they collected proverbs and popular poems from all nine islands. Braga's special interest in this area, however, involved the folksongs of the Azores. Teixeira Soares contributed his collection of the songs of São Jorge and was one of the chief collaborators on Braga's pioneering work, Cantos Populares do Archipelago Açorian ("Popular Songs from the Azorean Archipelago"). It was published in 1876, a year after Texeira Soares's death. He created a group of published works about São Jorge, and he also published numerous historic and ethnographic studies.

He died at the age of 54 on the island of São Miguel, aged 47.
