= João Teixeira (footballer, born July 1996) =

Andorran footballer

Personal information
- Full name: João Pedro da Silva Teixeira
- Date of birth: 17 July 1996 (age 30)
- Place of birth: Chaves, Portugal
- Height: 1.80 m (5 ft 11 in)
- Position: Midfielder

Team information
- Current team: Vilar de Perdizes

Youth career
- –2019: Chaves

Senior career*
Years	Team	Apps	(Gls)
2015–2016	Vilar de Perdizes		
2017	Ourense		
2017–2018	Chaves B		
2018–2019	Vilar de Perdizes	31	(6)
2019–2020	Carroi	19	(0)
2020–2021	Engordany	17	(0)
2021–2023	Ordino	51	(8)
2023–2025	Pas de la Casa	43	(2)
2025	Atlètic d'Escaldes	3	(0)
2025	Barbadás	9	(0)
2026	Vilar de Perdizes	0	(0)

International career^{‡}
2024–	Andorra	19	(0)
- * Club domestic league appearances and goals as of 21 December 2025 ‡ National team caps and goals as of 29 May 2026

João Pedro da Silva Teixeira (born 17 July 1996) is a football player who plays as a midfielder for Vilar de Perdizes. Born in Portugal, he represents the Andorra national team.

== International career ==
Teixeira made his debut for the senior Andorra national team on 21 March 2024 in a friendly against South Africa.
