= Santo Amaro (Velas) =

- Civil parish
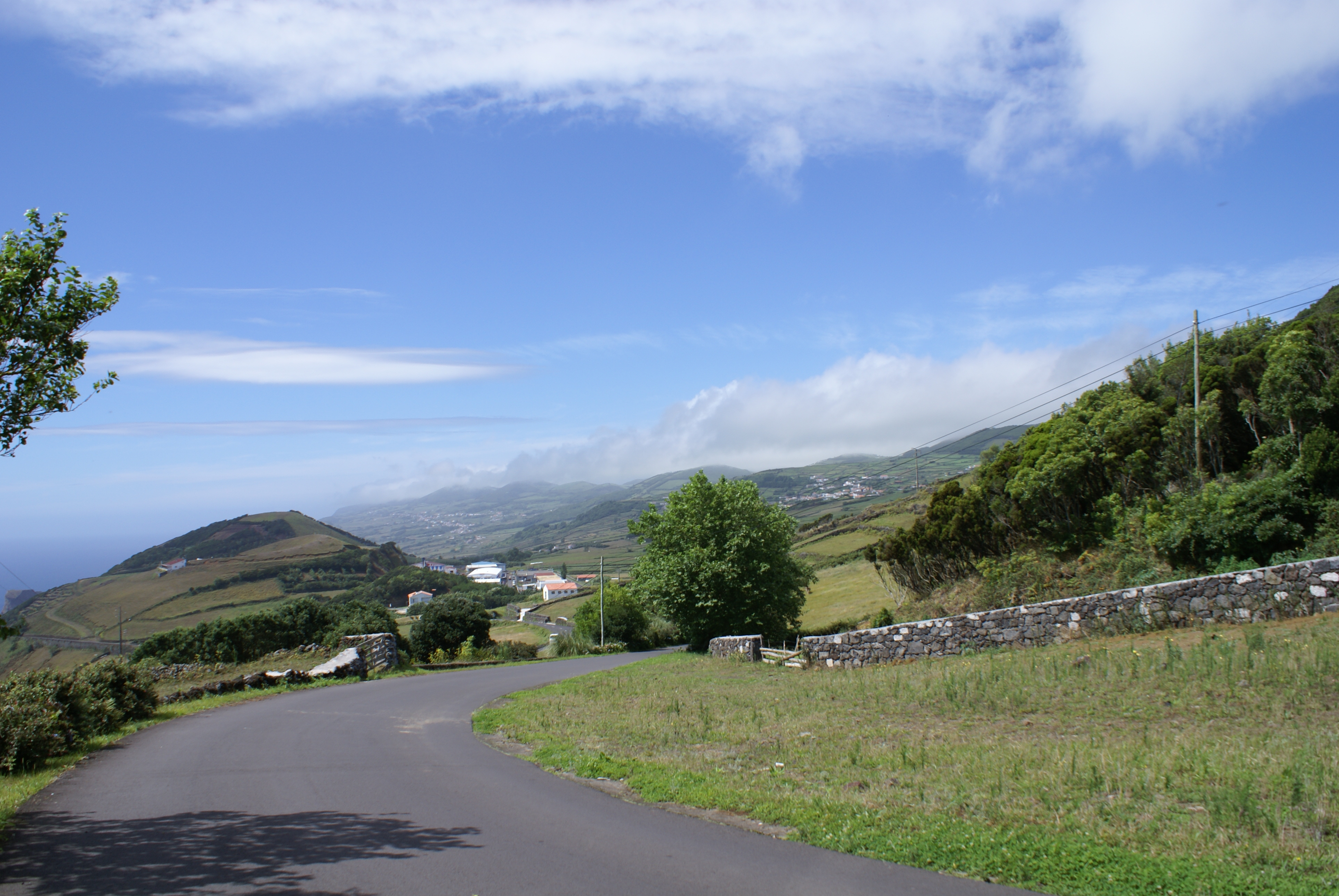
- Main road in the parish of Santo Amaro, near the main settlement, Calheta, São Jorge

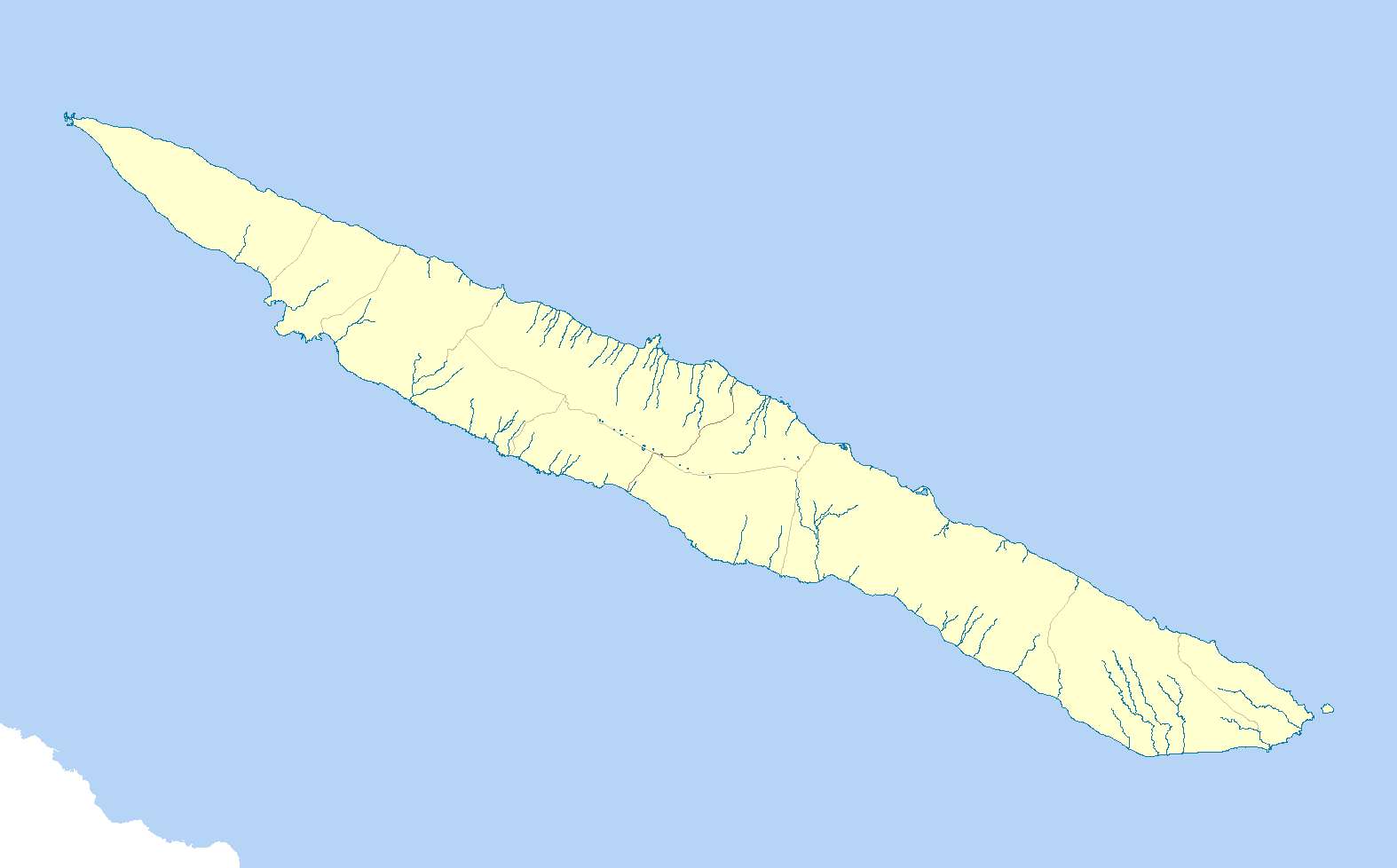
- Location in the Azores Santo Amaro (Velas) (São Jorge)
- Coordinates: 38°40′55″N 28°11′24″W
- Country: Portugal
- Auton. region: Azores
- Island: São Jorge
- Municipality: Velas

Area
  - Total: 22.53 km^{2} (8.70 sq mi)
- Elevation: 283 m (928 ft)

Population (2011)
  - Total: 862
  - Density: 38.3/km^{2} (99.1/sq mi)
- Time zone: UTC−01:00 (AZOT)
  - Summer (DST): UTC+00:00 (AZOST)
- Postal code: 9800-525
- Area code: 292
- Patron: Santa Amaro

Santo Amaro is a parish in the district of Velas in the Azores. The population in 2011 was 862, in an area of 22.53 km². It contains the localities Areias, Biscoitos, Boa Hora and Santo Amaro.
