= São Jorge Island =

Island of the Azores, Portugal

Native name: Ilha de São Jorge
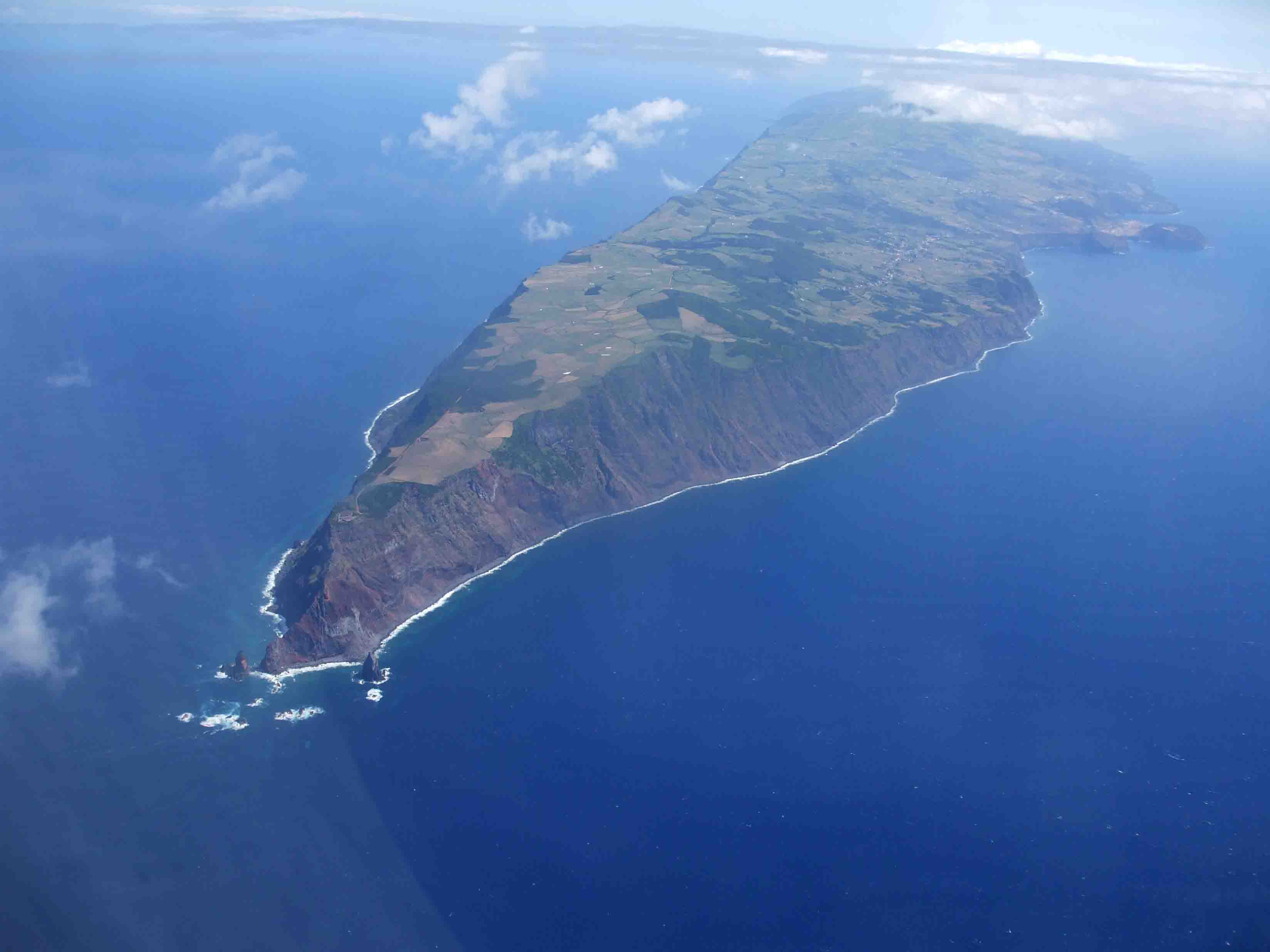
- The island of São Jorge seen from the north-northwest coast along the Ponta dos Rosais, Rosais

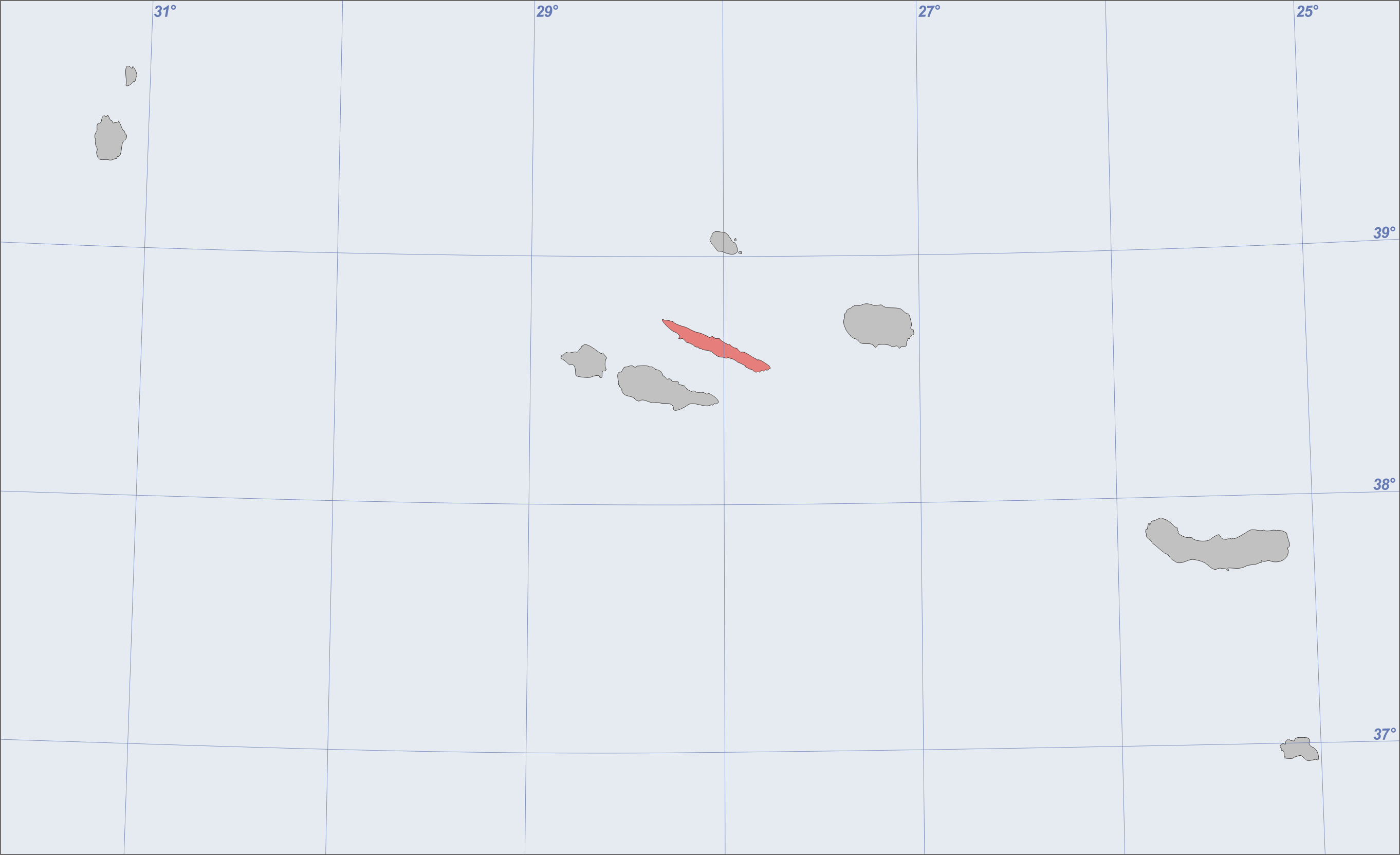
- Location of the island of São Jorge in the archipelago of the Azores

Geography
- Location: Atlantic Ocean
- Coordinates: 38°38′41″N 28°2′11″W
- Archipelago: Azores
- Area: 243.65 km^{2} (94.07 sq mi)
- Coastline: 139.27 km (86.538 mi)
- Highest elevation: 1,053.4 m (3456 ft)
- Highest point: Pico da Esperança

Administration
- Portugal
- Autonomous Region: Azores
- Municipalities: Calheta; Velas

Demographics
- Demonym: Sãojorgense/Jorgense
- Population: ▼8,373 (2021)
- Languages: Portuguese
- Ethnic groups: Portuguese

Additional information
- Time zone: UTC−01:00

São Jorge (Portuguese pronunciation: [sɐ̃w ˈʒɔɾʒɨ]; Portuguese for 'Saint George') is an island in the central group of the Azores archipelago and part of the autonomous region of Portugal. It is separated from its nearest neighbours (Pico and Faial islands) by the 15-kilometre (9.3 mi) Pico-São Jorge Channel; the three islands are often referred colloquially as the Triângulo ("Triangle") group or just "The Triangle". São Jorge is a relatively long thin island with tall cliffs, whose 8,381 inhabitants are concentrated on various geological debris fields (fajãs) along the north and south coasts; from east to west, the island is 53 kilometres (33 mi) long and, north to south, 8 kilometres (5.0 mi) wide: its area is 237.59 square kilometres (91.73 mi^{2}).

== History ==
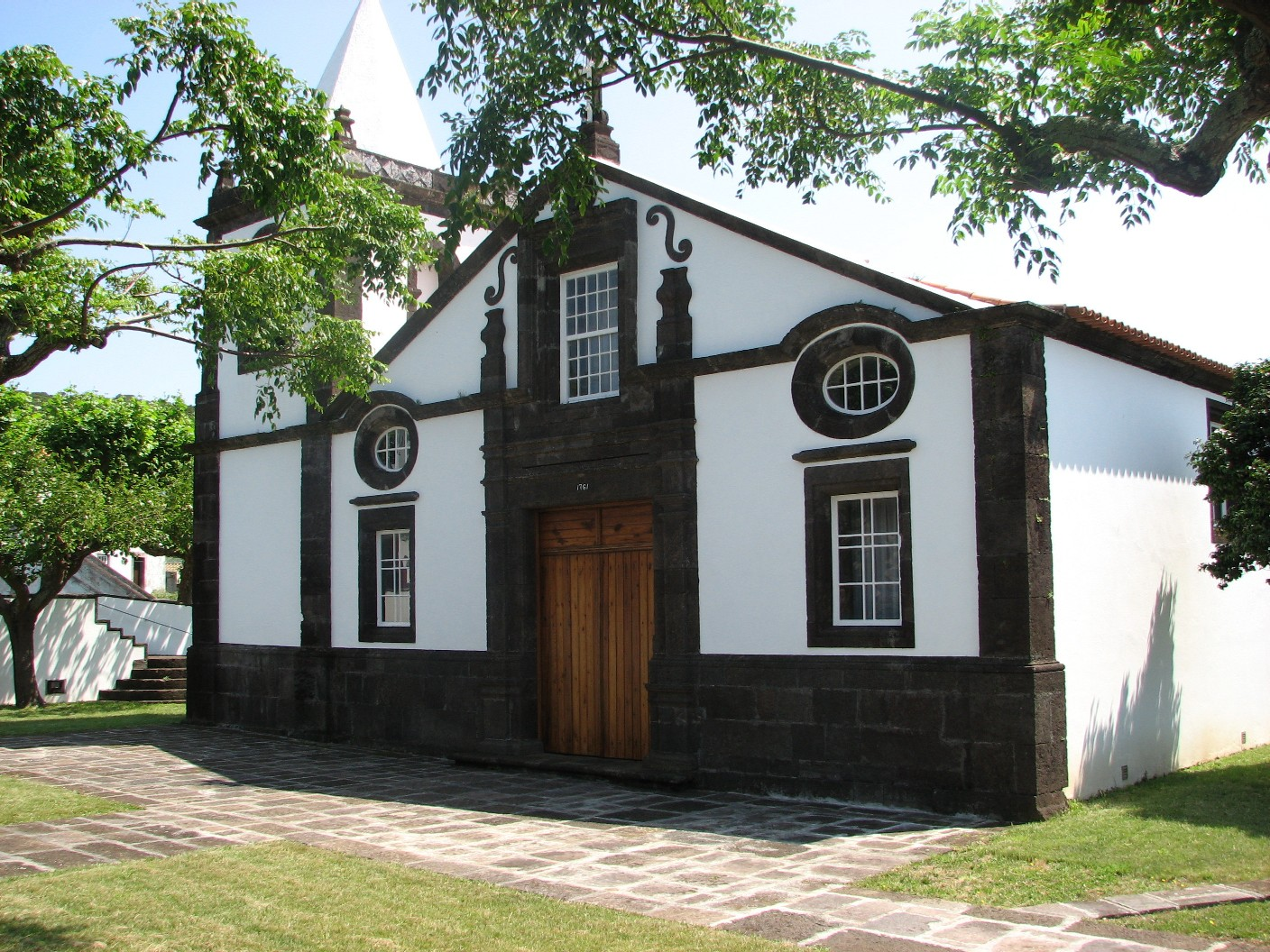
Matrix Church of Nossa Senhora do Rosário, Topo. Built in the 16th century, it is one of the earliest churches on the island of São Jorge

It is unclear when the first explorers discovered the island of São Jorge; as part of the politics of human occupation, the Azores were populated after 1430 (probably 1439) through the initiative of Prince Henry the Navigator. 23 April, known as the feast day of Saint George, has been cited by historians as the reason for the island's name, although this is likely conjecture. Genovese and Catalan maps of the 14th century originally designated the long, slender island "São Jorge", a designation that was maintained by Infante D. Henrique when settlers from northern Europe began to colonize the island (around 1460, or twenty years after it was first sighted).

Although unclear, Azorean chroniclers believe that settlement on the island concentrated around the two communities of Velas and Calheta, and developed into the interior. It was in 1460 that the construction of the first church dedicated to São Jorge occurred in the area of Velas, from the testaments of Infante D. Henrique. What is certain is that the island was populated by the time that João Vaz Corte Real, the Donatary-Captain of Angra do Heroísmo (Terceira) obtained the captaincy of the island, by contract on 4 May 1483. By 1500, the settlement of Velas was elevated from villa to municipality (giving rise to the supposition that Velas was the first center on the island). By 1659, the parochial church had already undergone public restoration, that gave origin to the present church in that municipality.

After an unsuccessful adventure to the island of Flores, the Flemish nobleman Willem van der Haegen (later known as Guilherme da Silveira) moved to the area of Topo where he established and founded a local community, in 1480. After living there for several years he died and was buried in the chapel of the Casa dos Tiagos. Topo was eventually elevated to capital of the municipality by 1510, but lost this title to Calheta on June 3, 1534. During this period, the island was wild and many of the roads difficult or non-existent between the communities, resulting in isolated villages located along the coast. Connections between these communities developed by sea, and the better provisioned ports were likely to develop economically. This was the case with Calheta, Urzelina and Velas; the sites, although farther from the Terceira (the towns are located on the opposite coast), were preferred way-points due to secure and sheltered ports, with good anchorage and providing many goods and services. The growth of the population was rapid, and by the mid-17th century, São Jorge had approximately 3000 inhabitants and three towns: Velas, Topo and Calheta. The island demonstrated a strong economic vitality: in addition to wine, corn, and yam, it was also an important exporter of woad to Flanders and other countries in Europe.

The dynastic crisis (1580) caused by the ascension of King Philip II of Spain (King Philip I of Portugal) had consequences on the island, since gentry supported (along with those on Terceira) the pretender to the throne, António, Prior of Crato. King António reigned on the continent for about twenty days, until he was defeated at the Battle of Alcântra, whereupon he moved his court to Terceira Island and governed in opposition until 1583. The Habsburg-supported King Phillip finally defeated his forces at sea at the Battle of Ponta Delgada between July 25–26, 1582, and the garrisons in São Jorge only capitulated to the forces of Castillo after the fall of Terceira in 1583.

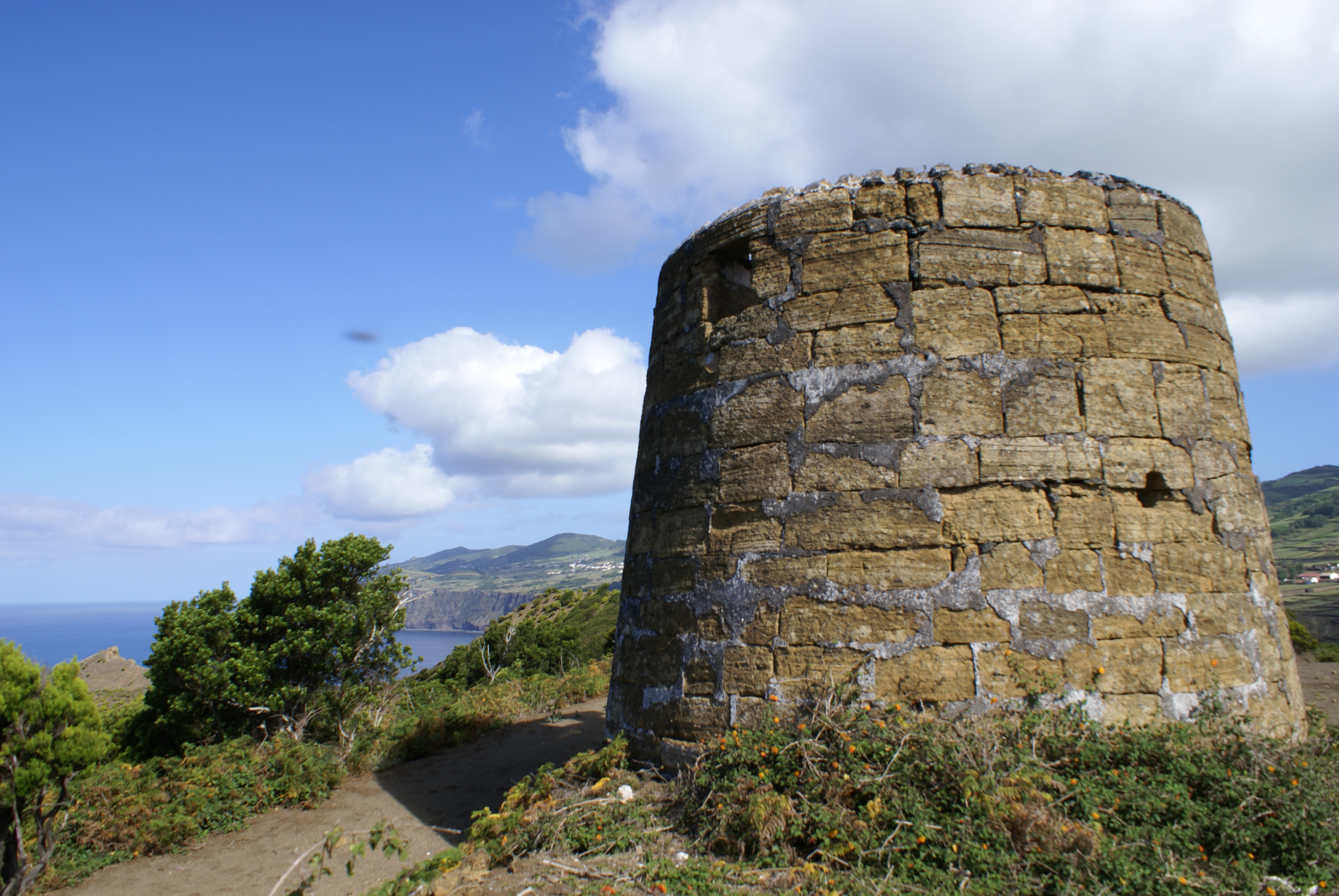
Old windmill, Morro das Velas

Following 1583, the island experienced a period of relative isolation, partially due to the poor quality of its ports and its limited economic importance. After the Spanish occupation, it was largely abandoned and its inhabitants were left to survive a meager existence. The island did not escape Atlantic piracy: the islanders were subject to attacks by English and French privateers in 1589 and 1590, raiders after 1590 (from the Barbary coast and lands occupied by the Turks) and during the 17th and 18th centuries (mostly around Calheta). In 1625, the inhabitants of Fajã de São João were captured by pirates and likely sold into slavery. The tranquillity around the island was also broken on September 20, 1708, when the town of Velas was attacked by French pirates under the command of René Duguay-Trouin. The population of the community resisted for twenty-four hours, but eventually the pirates made shore where they disembarked. The resistance, commanded by Sergeant-major Amaro Soares de Sousa, occurred around the village of Banquetas saving the other villages from occupation and pillaging.

During the Portuguese Civil War, Liberalist forces were stationed on the island after May 10, 1831. Generally, the island's residents have lived for many years in isolation, interrupted by rare visits from the authorities, commercial boats from the local islands, and the occasional nobleman who has come to contemplate the local scenery.

With the inauguration of its ports, and the airport/aerodrome (April 23, 1982) commercial ventures have grown (especially the export of the local cheese), the expansion of animal husbandry, the fisheries and a small crafts industry.

== Geography ==
São Jorge
- Radar image of São Jorge Island (top) next to Pico and Faial islands

Highest point
- Elevation: 1,053 metres (3,455 ft)
- Coordinates: 38.65°N 28.08°W

Geography

Geology
- Mountain type: Fissure vent
- Last eruption: 1902

=== Physical geography ===
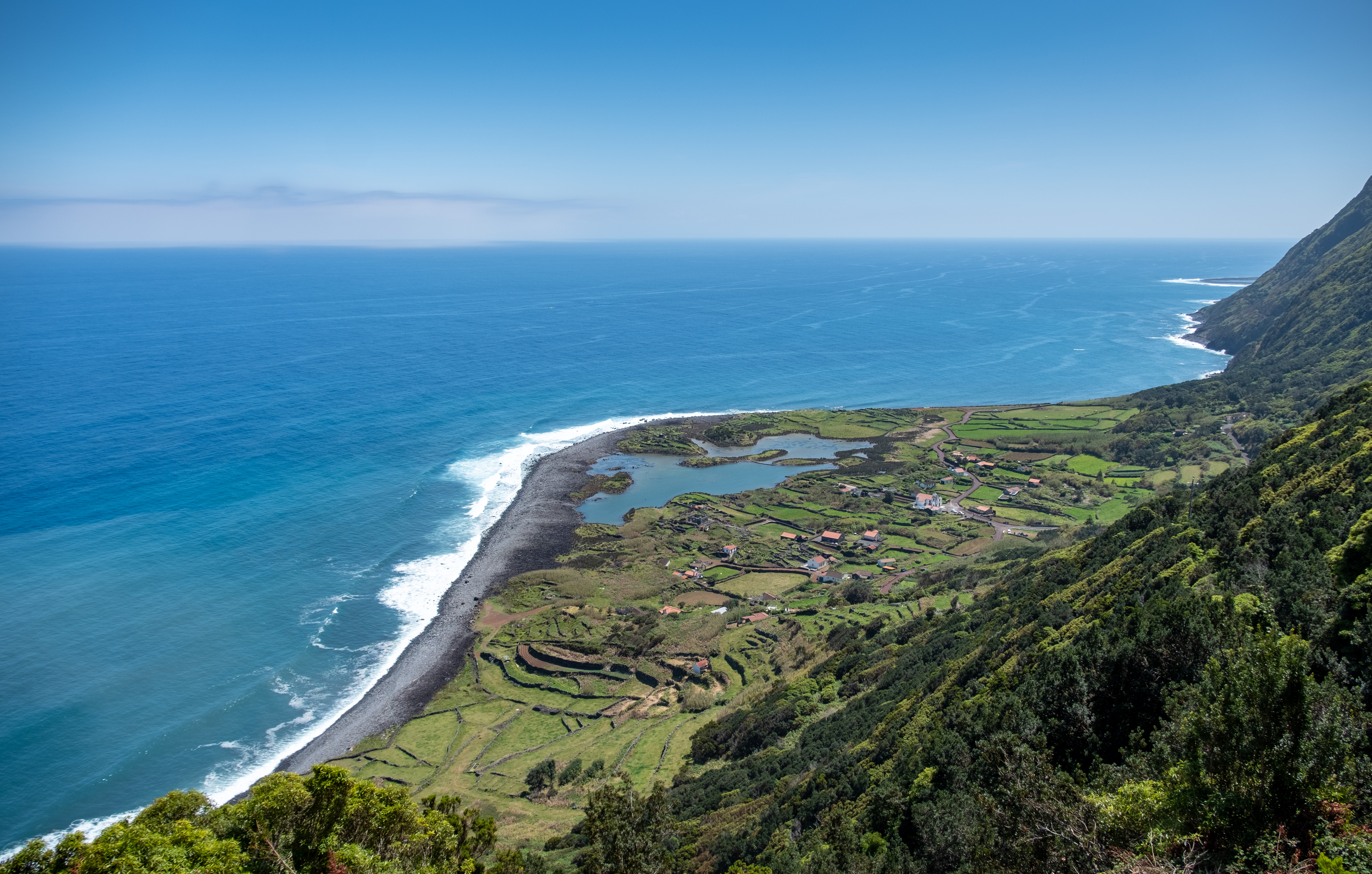
A fajã (Fajã dos Cubres), one of the most iconic and representative landscapes of this island.

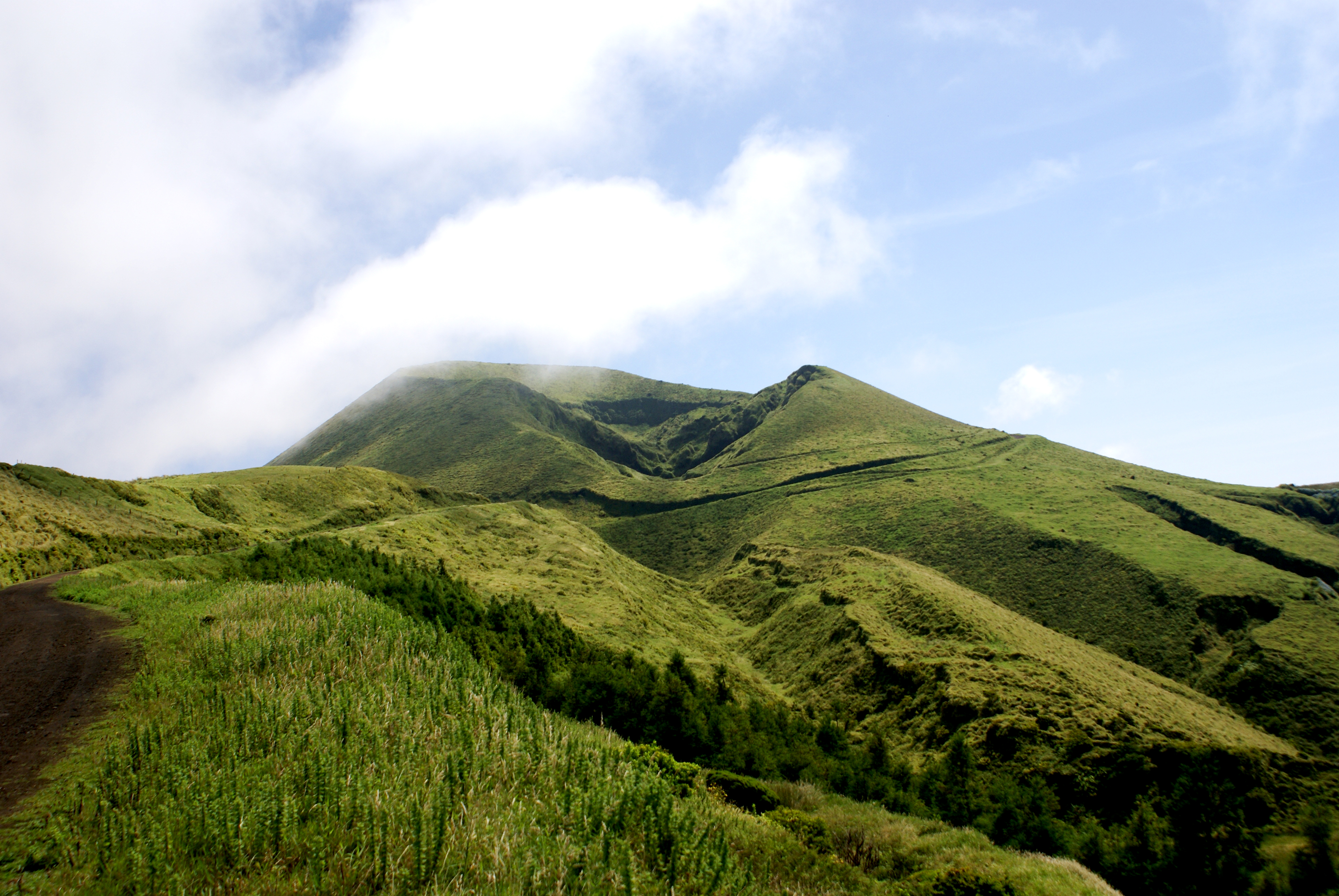
Morro Pelado, a cinder cone in São Jorge which has the deepest volcanic cavity on the Azores, 140 m (460 ft) deep. This cavity presents two large caves underneath

Unique among the islands of Azores, São Jorge is uncharacteristically long and slender and susceptible to ocean erosion. The island was built on fissural volcanism associated with the plate tectonics of the mid-Atlantic Ridge and a transform fault that extends from the Ridge to the island of São Miguel (referred to as the São Jorge Fault). Through successive fissural eruptions the island was built up: the only remnants of these forces are the line of volcanic cones that extend along the central ridge (approximately 700 metres in altitude).

The island was built up from successive morphological structures of progressively younger materials, these include:

- Topo Volcanic Complex – predominantly built of basalt, hawaiite, and mugearite lavas and pyroclastic deposits and Strombolian cinder cones. Materials in this formation were produced are about 600,000 years in age.
- Rosais Volcanic Complex – consisting of the northeastern portion of the island, with a similar composition to those materials in Topo.
- Manadas Volcanic Complex – most recent formation composed of Strombolian cones and two Surtseyan cones (Morro de Lemos and Morro Velho), as well as craters and tuff rings resulting from Phreatomagmatic activity.

The island is 55 km in length from the Ponta dos Rosais until the Topo Islet and a maximum width between Fajã das Pontas and Portinho da Calheta (approximately 7 km). The highest point is Pico da Esperança at 1,053 meters. The island has an area of 246 km^{2}, with an obvious difference in the relief between the western and eastern portions of the island: the western coast is ringed with cliffs, while the eastern coast is morphologically smoother. Similarly, the contrast between the northern and southern coasts are obvious; apart from several deltas (fajãs) on both coasts, the northern coast has sharp cliffs, while the southern coast is less inclined. The majority of the cliffs in the northeast are between 300 and 400 m with severe slopes (between 45° and 55°). In this area, many of the fajãs, some composed of lavas (Fajã do Ouvidor, Fajã das Pontas and Fajã da Ribeira da Areia) and others dendritic (Fajã de João Dias and Fajã da Penedia), are visible. In the southwest the cliffs are approximately 100m in height and most settlements are located along the lava deltas, such as the Fajã das Velas, Fajã da Queimada, Fajã Grande and Fajã da Calheta.

=== Eruption history ===
Periods of local prosperity or misery occurred in the following years; there were several bad growing seasons and natural catastrophes (such as the earthquakes, volcanic eruptions and tornados in 1580, 1757, 1808 and 1899) that created famines and hardships. The most famous of these eruptions began in the early morning of May 1, 1808 (Urzelina eruption). Suffocating gases, as well as carboxylic acid, were emitted from a vent along the Manadas ridge and thick greenish vaporous clouds (of chloric and sulfuric acids) rapidly spread to the plants. Eight major tremors were recorded per hour that caused widespread panic. Many of the homes, buildings and cultivatable lands were destroyed. Between 1580 and 1907, at least six significant eruptions occurred; ten people were killed during the 1580 eruption and eight in 1808. In 1850, the island's vineyards were devastated by the phylloxera plague, which had a terrible effect on the economy until the development of the orange industry (about 1860). The island's isolation ended after the completion of the ports of Velas and Calheta.

The last terrestrial volcanic eruption on the island of São Jorge was the eruption of "Vulcão da Urzelina" in 1808.

==== 2022 São Jorge Seismovolcanic crisis ====
From March 2022, São Jorge Island had been the location of a serious seismovolcanic crisis. The Instituto de Investigação em Vulcanologia e Avaliação de Riscos is following the crisis with a special webpage called "Crise Sismovulcânica de São Jorge". The alarm level on 26 March was 4, "this means that according to the alarm scale in force in the Azores archipelago we are in the pre-eruptive volcanic phase".

=== Climate ===
Owing to its position in the mid-North Atlantic Ocean, influenced by the Gulf Stream, São Jorge has a humid subtropical climate with very mild winters and warm summers, although, being a generally elevated island, temperatures tend to be cooler on the hilly center and warmer downslope of the many fajãs that characterize the island. Water temperatures vary between 16 and 24 °C (61 and 75 °F) while the average temperature varies between 14 and 22 °C (57 and 72 °F).

Climate data for Calheta (1971–1996)
Month	Jan	Feb	Mar	Apr	May	Jun	Jul	Aug	Sep	Oct	Nov	Dec	Year
Average precipitation mm (inches)	138.0 (5.43)	126.6 (4.98)	103.6 (4.08)	95.3 (3.75)	63.2 (2.49)	55.9 (2.20)	39.5 (1.56)	63.2 (2.49)	134.6 (5.30)	137.7 (5.42)	162.7 (6.41)	138.4 (5.45)	1,258.7 (49.56)
Source: IPMA

=== Human geography ===
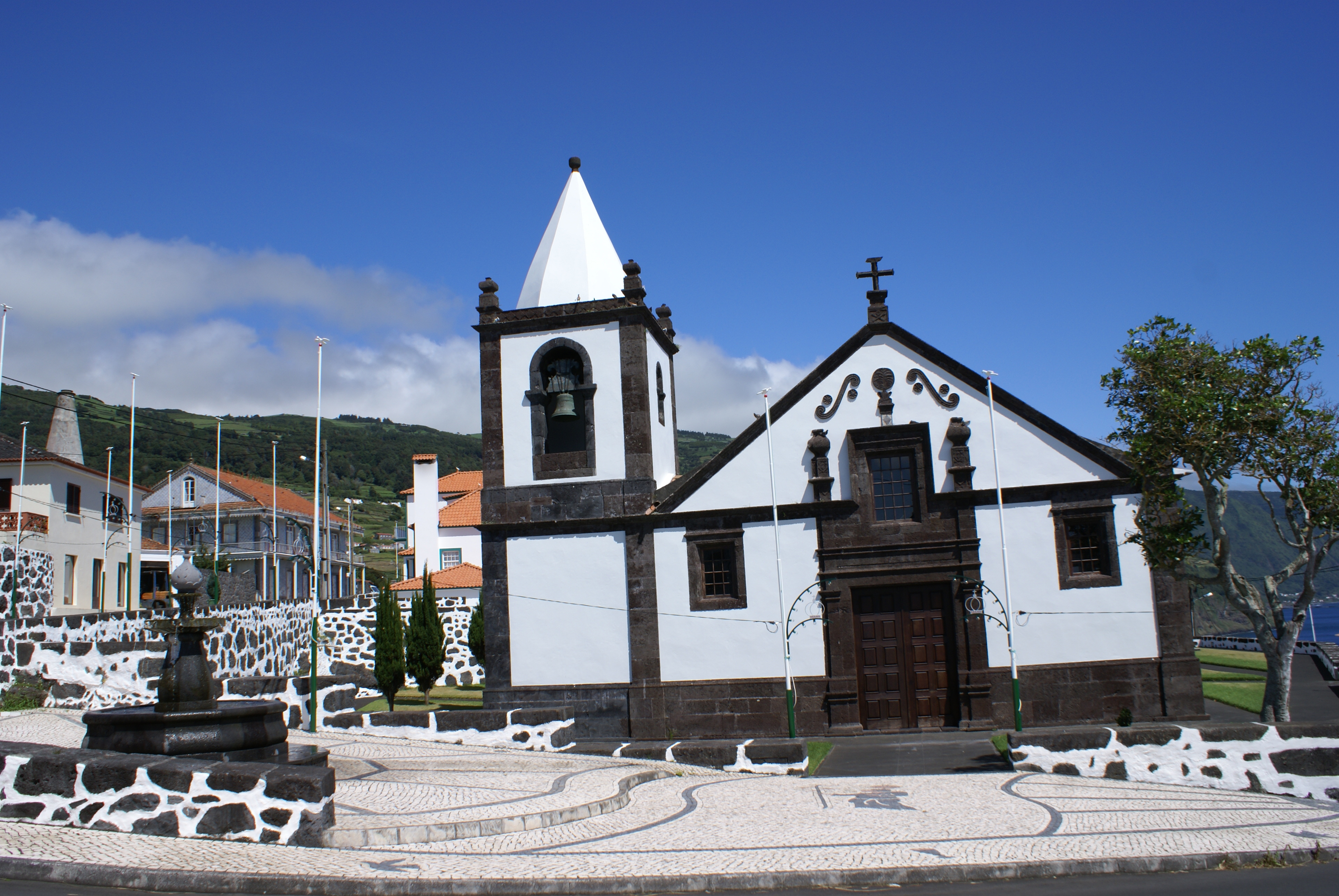
São Tiago Maior Church, Ribeira Seca

The geomorphology of the island (its high cliffs, rough central plateaus and scattered fajãs) resulted in the concentration of human settlements along the coast. Historically these communities were linked by coastal ports since the trails in the interior were barely transitable. Consequently, communities were isolated from one another necessitating local solutions to common problems and building local ties between families. Velas, Calheta and Topo developed partially due to well developed ports and local economies, in addition to administrative necessity and central positions. The settlements developed with immigration from Spain and Flanders, principally by settlers brought by the Ávilas and by Willem van de Hagen.

Administratively, São Jorge is divided into two municipalities: Calheta in the east with five parishes and Velas in the west with six parishes. The rural population is basically aligned along the lines of communication divided by areas of unpopulated pastureland between localities.

== Economy ==
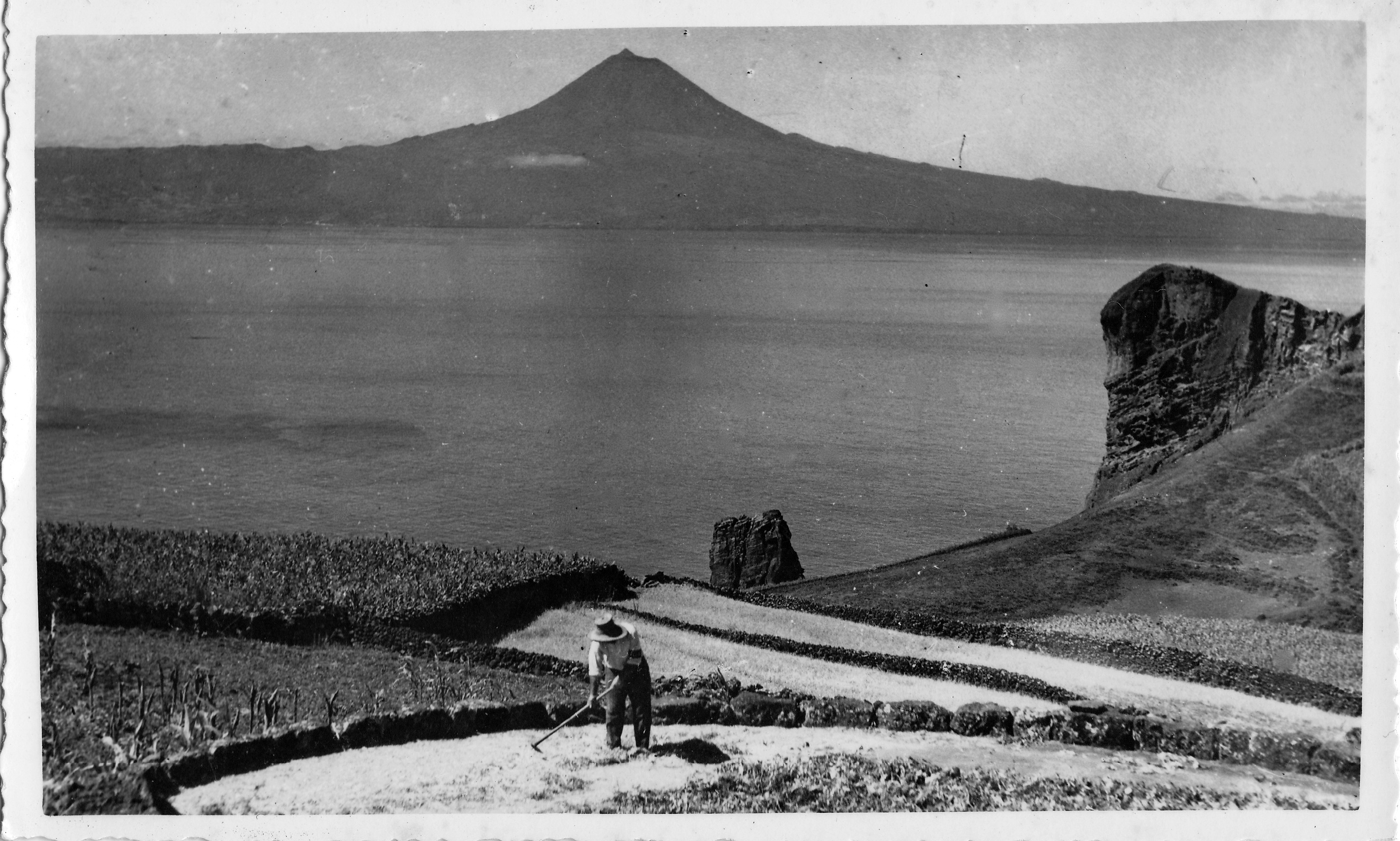
Agricultural fields in Morro de Velas

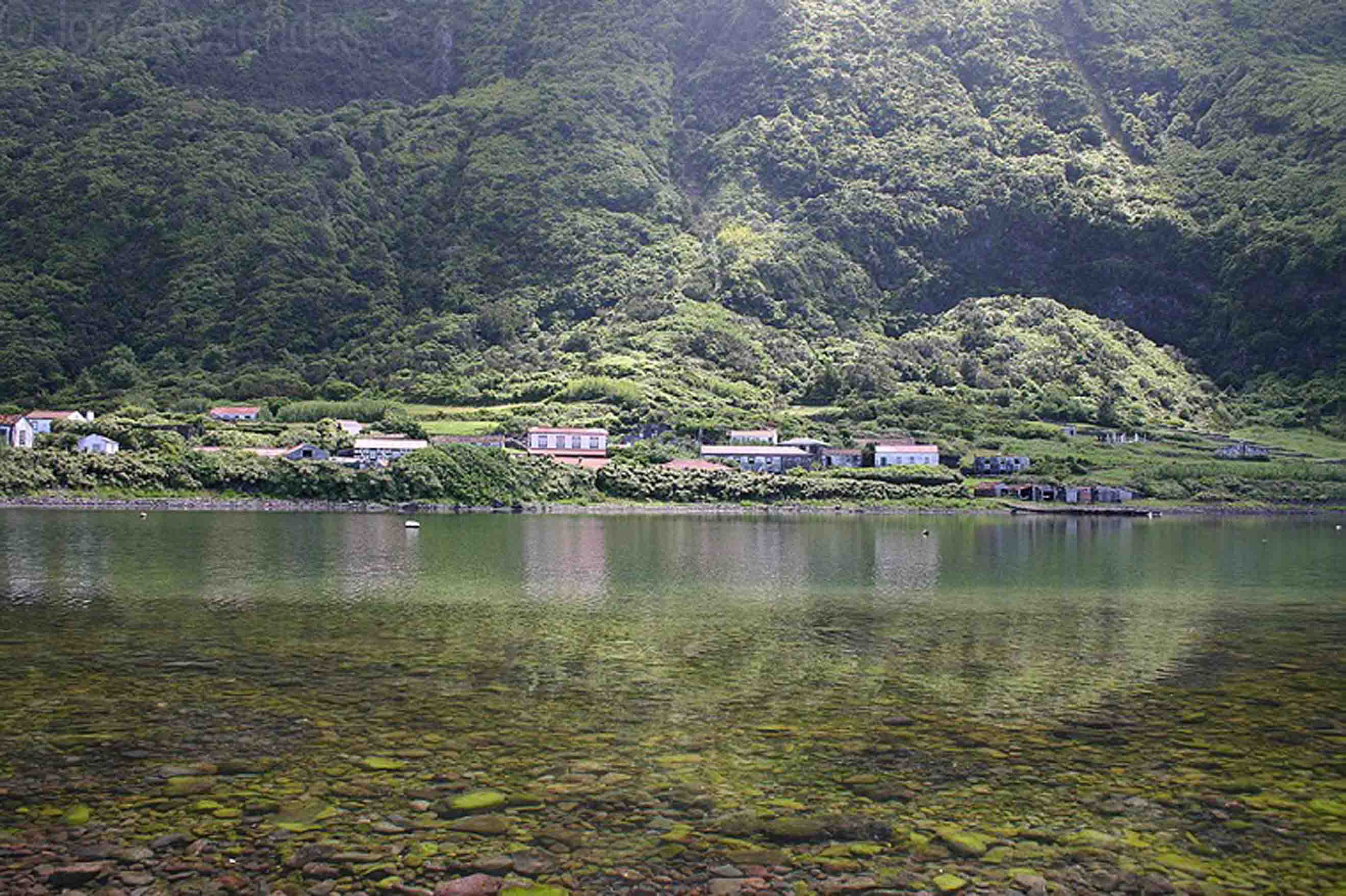
Lagoon and Fajã of Santo Cristo

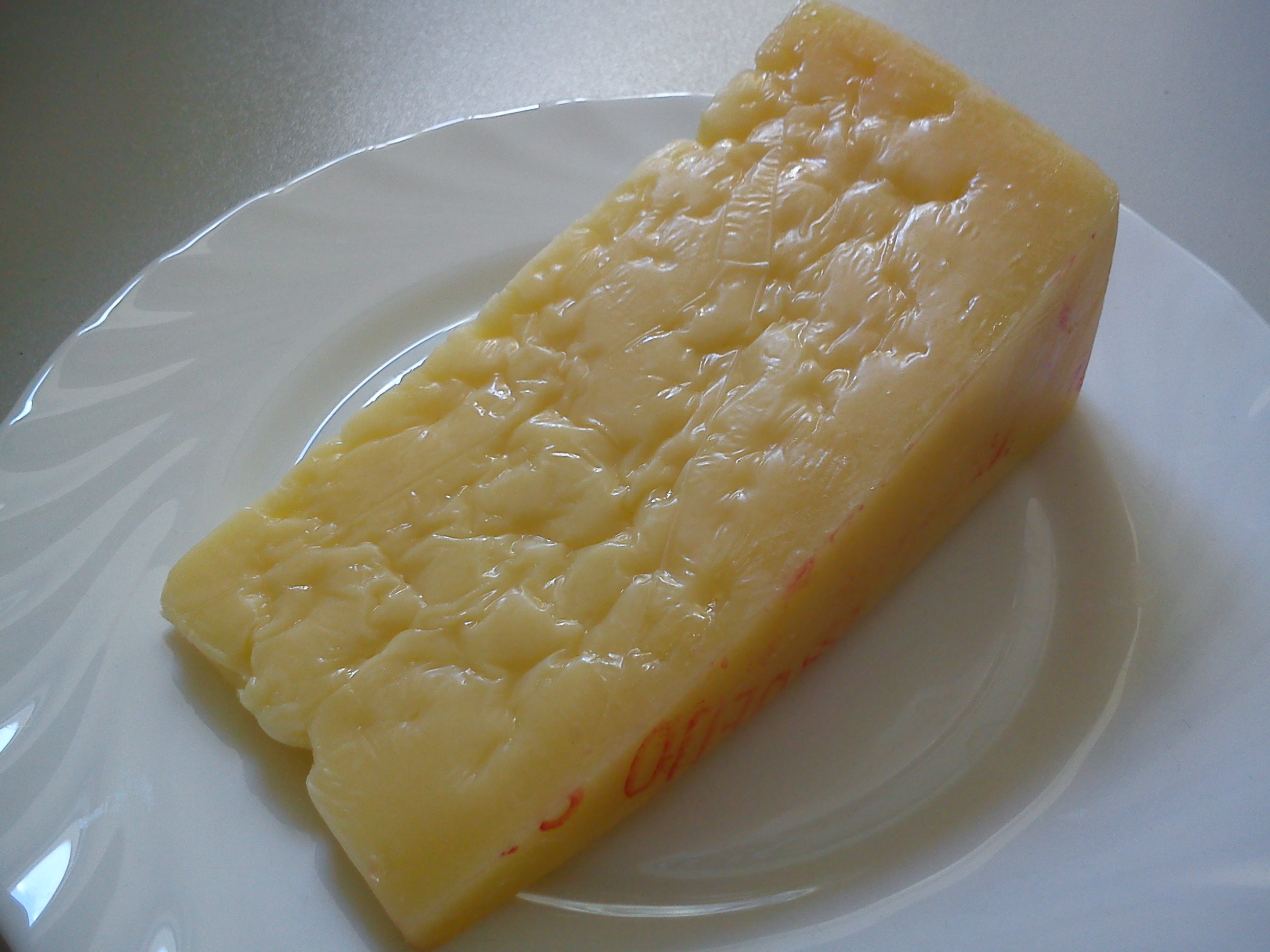
São Jorge cheese is a spicy cheese produced exclusively in São Jorge

After a period of small subsistence agriculture, the local economy began to concentrate on a few chief exports: initially, lichen (Roccella tinctoria) and woad (Isatis tinctoria), later the introduction of wheat and corn crops. Woad was one of the most important exports from São Jorge and the Azores; it was initially introduced by Willem van der Hagen around 1490, and exported primarily to his countrymen in Flanders. Both woad and lichen were very popular in central Europe as a dye.

These exports were later superseded by grapes and wine after 1571 and endured for the next three centuries. It was first disseminated along the southern coast, owing to the fertile soils, and adapted well to many of the fajãs of Calheta (including Fajã dos Vimes, Fajã de São João, Fajã do Ouvidor, and Fajã Grande), as well as the areas between Ribeira do Almeirda and the parish of Queimadas (in Velas). These were generally considered lands that were not adequate for cereal cultivation, but where vineyards flourished. The majority of the wine production was located in the area between Queimada, Urzelina and Manadas, with grapes of the Verdelho and Terrantez castes, as well as some Bastardo, Moscatel and Alicante produced in an area that became lucrative and highly prized. Unlike the other islands, where grape vines grew on the rocky hedge-rows or around protective volcanic rocks, the grapes of São Jorge were grown between many of the natural species of bush and trees. Over the centuries many barrels of wine were produced in this method, and about 10,000 barrels were regularly exported or consumed locally. São Jorge wines were so highly esteemed that the Count of Almada, then Captain General of the Azores, created the "São Jorge" brand in order to mitigate fraudulent sales. The wine was also appreciated during the World Exposition of 1867 (in Paris, France) where it rivalled Porto wine. Unfortunately, the powdery mildew disease Erysiphe necator reached the island in late 1854 and destroyed the prosperous industry. Various attempts were made to restart the wine industry, such as Francisco José de Bettencourt e Ávila, the Baron Ribeiro in the area of Urzelina, and later Miguel Teixeira Soares de Sousa and Marta Pereira da Silveira, who produced wine from the Izabela caste. Meanwhile, the phylloxera disease continued to destroy many of the vineyards in the municipality of Calheta during the second half of the 18th century, and throughout the island the disease would bring many producers to bankruptcy. The remnants of the viticulture of the island banded together around Casteletes, in Urzelina, which include João Inácio de Bettencourt Noronha, producing a new caste of wines around Urzelina and Fajã de São João.

Orange cultivation spread in the Azores around the 17th Century owing to the environmental conditions and the fertility of the lands. The export of oranges to the United Kingdom and North America was an important phase in the island's economy; about six shipments per port were annually exported, which included about 7 million (or about 994,000 kilograms) oranges. Orange orchards were located primarily in the communities of Santo Amaro, Urzelina, Ribeira Seca and in Fajã de São Joãos.

Another crop to form a part of the culture of the Azores is the yam. It is widely popular and cultivated in any plot of land, and was used as an important subsistence food during the island's formative years although never becoming a major export product. It was so important that it was included in the Coat-of-Arms of Calheta, since 1694.

Long before whale-watching became important, whaling was an important industry between the end of the 19th century and middle of the 20th century, where a majority of the inhabitants were tied exclusively to this economy. In strategic locations along the coast, small huts were built to watch-out for whales and give an alarm to the local hunters, who would sail out and harpoon the mammals. Later, when this hunt was prohibited, the islanders began to "hunt" Albacor and Bonito Tuna resulting in the creation of two processing plants in Calheta. Fishing continues to be an important part of the local economy, although whale-watching has turned into a part of local tourism.

While cereals, vineyards and local vegetables are still grown sporadically around the island (much like the other islands of the Azores) the economy of São Jorge is currently dependent on the dairy industry. The local São Jorge cheese has been the most important part of the local economy, resulting in the establishment of an order, the Confraria do Queijo de São Jorge, to promote the consumption and sale of this popular cheese. In addition, Uniqueijo União de Cooperativeas Agrícolas de Lacticínios de São Jorge (Cooperative Agricultural Union of São Jorge Dairy Producers) is the principal dairy-producer on the island. A union of eight cooperatives, Uniqueijo is dedicated to the commercialization of the traditional São Jorge cheese, including new products classified under the DOP Denominação de Origem Protegida (Denomination of Protected Origin) status.

== Culture, tradition and tourism ==
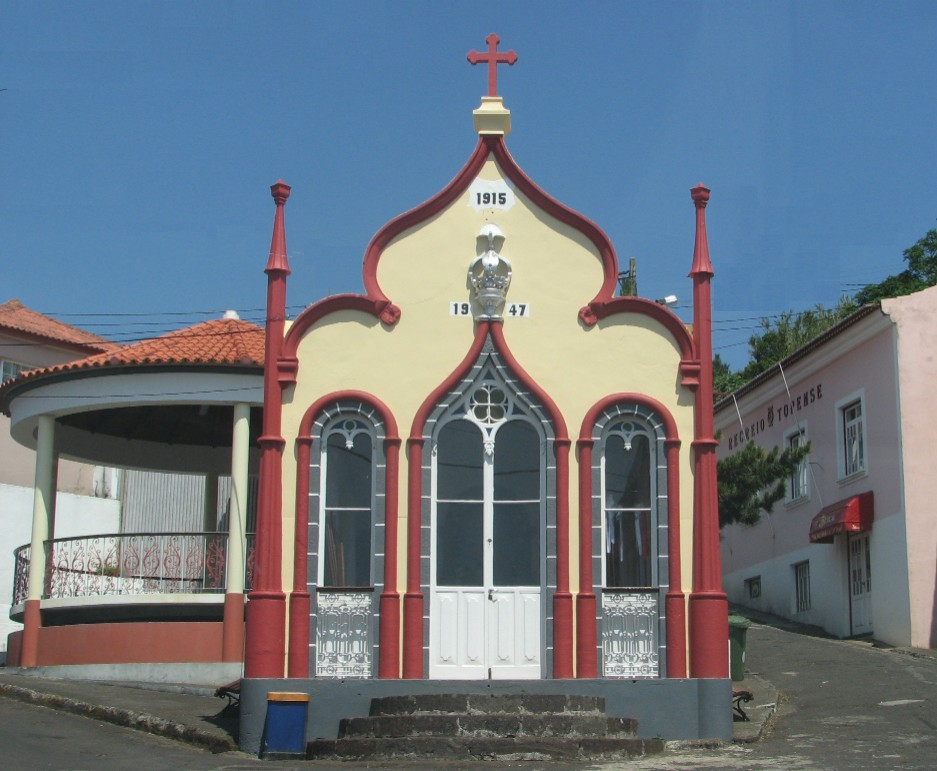
An império, in Topo, used in annual festivals to celebrate the Holy Spirit

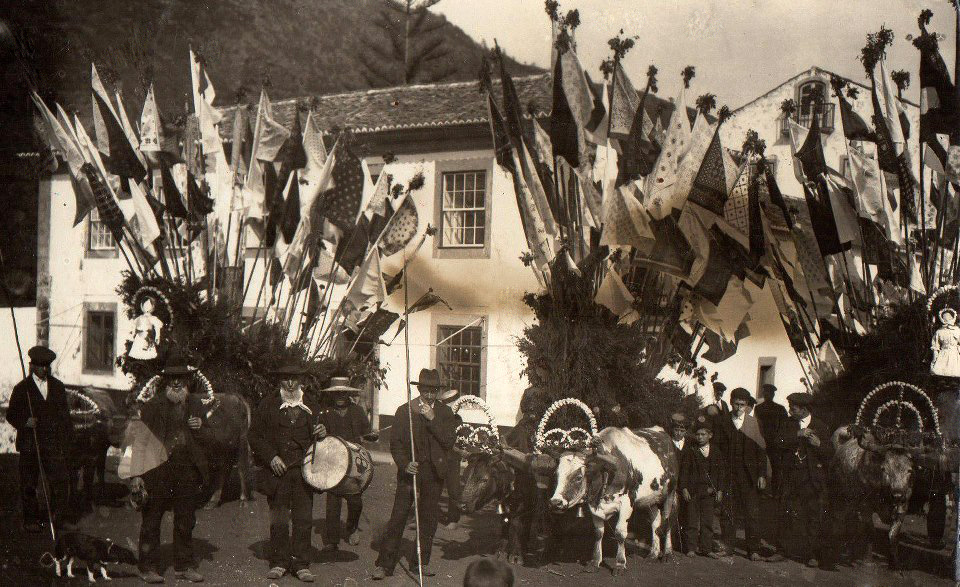
Ox carts decorated for the festivities of Espírito Santo, 20th century

=== Festivities ===
The principal festivals popular on the island are not dissimilar to those celebrated on the islands of the archipelago. There are the festivals of Espírito Santo that concentrate on the many impérios around the island, and are an important manifestation of the religious character of the islands. These festivals occur every Sunday during the seven weeks after Easter, and culminate on the seventh Sunday, Pentecosts, although some traditions vary from place-to-place. Generally, there are processions to the church and masses associated with this festival, but also include alms for the poor, the serving of a meat-soup-like broth (whose methods of preparation and serving vary from community to community) and gathering of the local citizens for conversation and/or dancing.

Velas' Semana Cultural (Culture Week) is also another festivity that mixes local traditions and cultural influences from abroad. During this week expositions and presentations of local Azorean culture are mixed with local concerts, bullfights, and finally a regata between Velas and Horta, Faial during the first week of July. Meanwhile, in the village of Calheta the Festival de Julho (the July Festival) highlights four days of festivities that brings together ethnic processions, musical comedies, theatrical presentations and local sports competitions.

The Romarias (religious pilgrimages) are a tradition of the island's Catholic communities, and strongly linked to catastrophes associated with historical earthquakes and volcanic eruptions. The Romaria de Nossa Senhora de Carmo, which occurs annually in the Fajã dos Vimes (July 16), and the Romaria do Santo Cristo in the Fajã da Caldeira de Santo Cristo, are popular processions where many faithful walk between religious sanctuaries in prayer and contemplation, usually stopping for Mass at local churches.

=== Tradition ===
The local gastronomy includes many Azorean basics, but includes local plates of fish and pork with an abundance of spices, typical of the communities visited by far eastern caravels during the Age of Exploration. Clam dishes are fairly common in São Jorge, being the only location in the archipelago where clams are discovered (usually in the Fajã da Caldeira de Santo Cristo). Generally there is an abundance of locals’ sweets for tourists, including coscorões, roquilhas de aguardente, espécies, suspiros, olvidados, bolos de véspera, cavacos, queijadas de leite, and açucareura branca. In addition, the traditional cornbread (made from white or yellow cornmeal) is still very popular, since wheat-based breads were generally for the privileged classes of the island. The Azorean yam was also an important base of the local diet, as well as an export product.

== Notable people ==
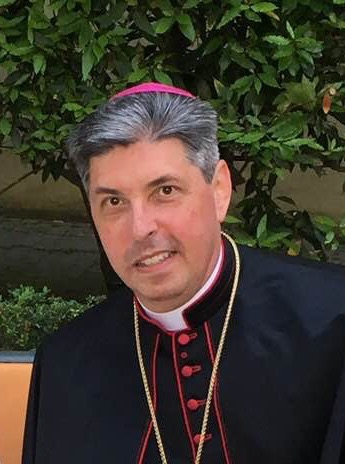
The Most Rev. José Avelino Bettencourt, 2018

- João Soares de Albergaria de Sousa (1776 in Velas – 1875) a liberal politician, rural landowner and author of the 1822 manifesto Corografia Açórica, a thesis on Azorean regional sovereignty.
- João Teixeira Soares de Sousa (1827 in Velas – 1875) an entrepreneur, politician, anthropologist and ethnographist
- José Cândido da Silveira Avelar (1843 in Velas – 1905) an historian and author who wrote about the island of São Jorge.
- João Duarte de Sousa (1862 in Velas – 1909) a politician, historian and writer about São Jorge
- John Bettencourt Avila (1865–1937) a California farmer, the father of the sweet potato
- Maria dos Santos Machado (1890 in Calheta – 1958) a teacher and PCP activist against the Estado Novo government
- José Avelino Bettencourt (born 1962 in Velas) a Portuguese-Canadian prelate of the Catholic Church and Apostolic Nuncio to Armenia and Georgia since March 2018.

== See also ==
- List of volcanoes in Azores
