= Velas, Azores =

Velas
- Municipality
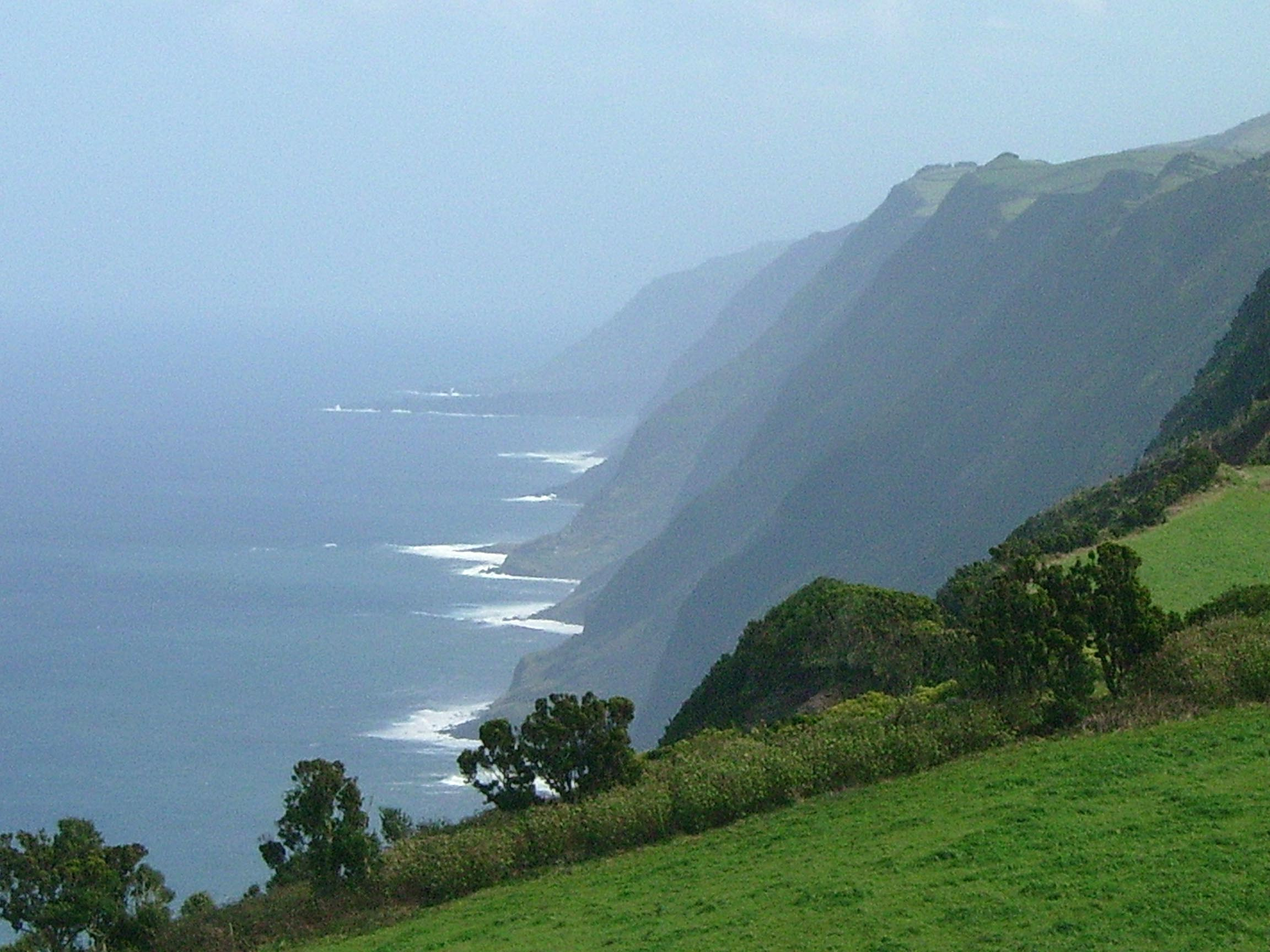
- Northern coast of Velas, showing Fajã de Fernando Afonso, as seen from the Park of Sete Fontes

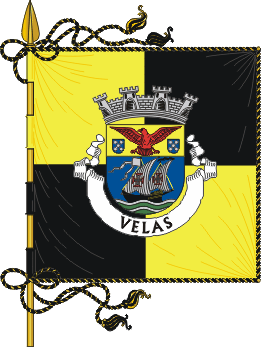
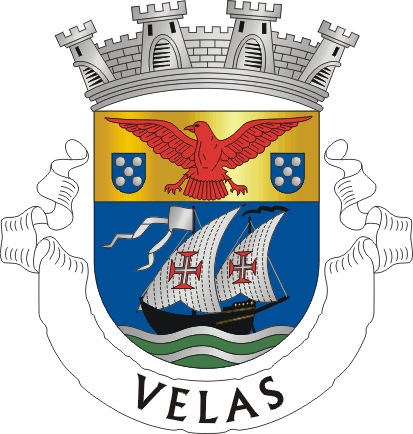
- Flag Coat of arms
- Interactive map of Velas
- Coordinates: 38°40′55″N 28°12′33″W
- Country: Portugal
- Auton. region: Azores
- Island: São Jorge
- Established: Settlement: c. 1460; Municipality: c. 1500
- Seat: Velas Municipal Chamber
- Parishes: 6

Government
  - President: Manuel Soares Silveira

Area
  - Total: 117.38 km^{2} (45.32 sq mi)
- Elevation: 40 m (130 ft)

Population (2011)
  - Total: 5,398
  - Density: 45.99/km^{2} (119.1/sq mi)
- Time zone: UTC−01:00 (AZOT)
  - Summer (DST): UTC+00:00 (AZOST)
- Postal code: 9800-539
- Area code: 292
- Patron: São Jorge
- Local holiday: 23 April
- Website: https://cmvelas.pt/

Velas (Portuguese pronunciation: [ˈvɛlɐʃ]) is a municipality in the São Jorge Island, in the Portuguese autonomous region of Azores. The municipality encompasses the western portion of the island, with its municipal seat in the town of Velas on the south coast, and is divided into six parishes. The population in 2011 was 5,398, in an area of 117.38 km².

== History ==
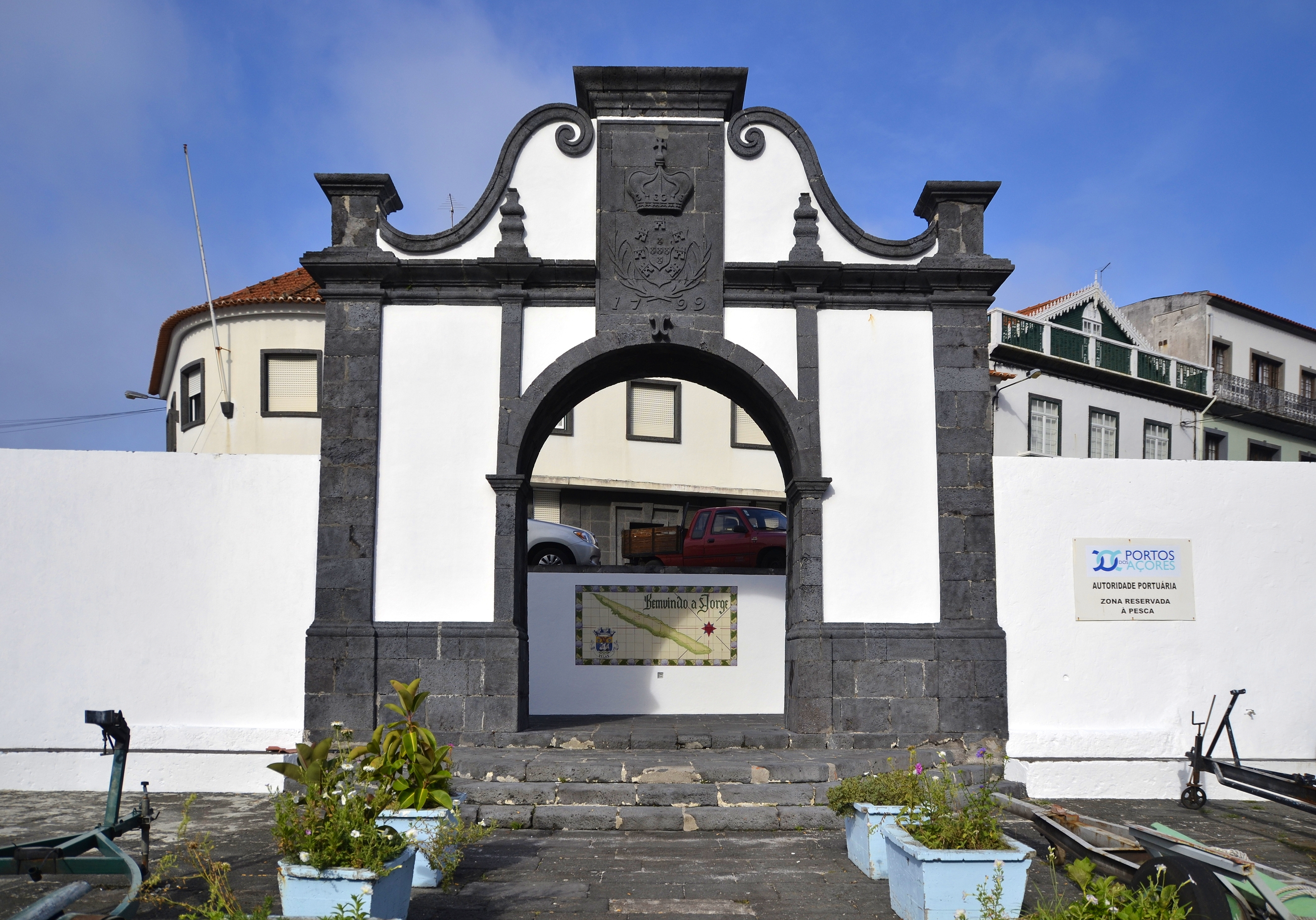
The City Gates of Velas, constructed during the 18th Century at the entrance to village at the Port of Velas

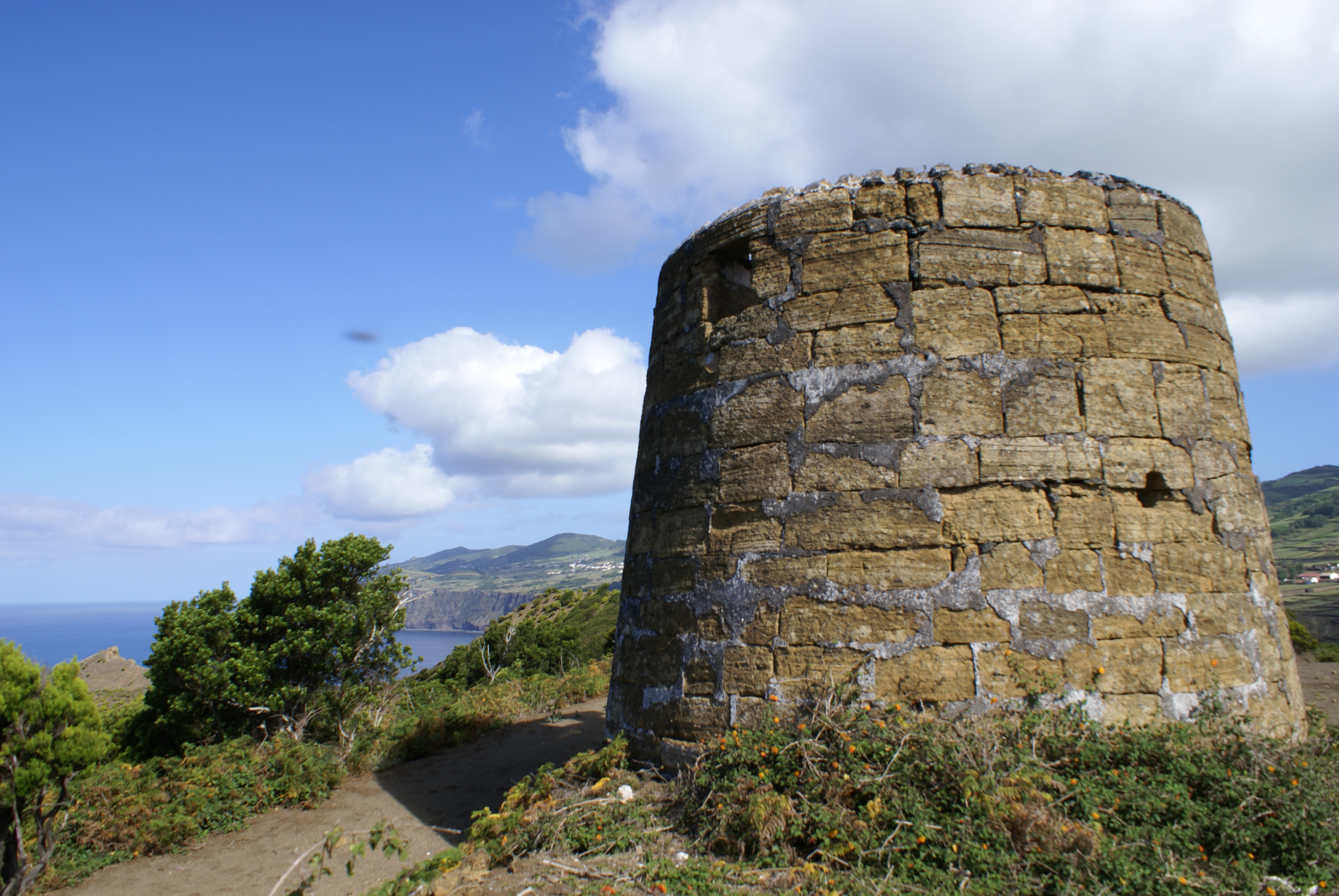
The ruins of an old windmill, located on the Morro das Velas, along the south-west coast of the village of Velas

The origin of the name Velas has never been clarified by historians, although it may refer to the number of sailing ships that congregated in the municipality ("velas" is Portuguese for candles or sails). There may also been confusing in the similarity between velas, the word velhas (which means "old" in Portuguese) or "belas" (which means "beautiful", in the same language). Another reference is to the Portuguese term "vilar", which means vigilant, and may have been used to situation in the Canal, where residents were ever-vigilant for volcanic eruptions and/or seismic events.

The village of Velas is one of the oldest settled communities on the island, and has been traced back to the testimony of Infante D. Henrique, who referred to the 1460 when the community congregated around their church to the evocation of São Jorge. Its administrative status was elaborated in 1500, when it became the municipal authority and main village in the western part of the island (Topo being the first municipality). It was in 1507 that Velas could be identified on a map of the island of São Jorge as village. Similarly, the localities of Santo António (Norte Grande), and in 1559 Manadas were first recognized as a major settlements in the municipality; both centers would become religious parishes in 1543 and 1568 respectively. It was also in 1568, that Rosais would be recognized as a parish.

On the evening of April 28, 1580 (and during the following day), the ground would begin a series of about 80 earthquakes, that would cease abruptly. Nevertheless, on May 1 the tremors would return, followed by a volcanic explosion in the area of Queimada and later in the heights of Ribeira do Nabo, two kilometers east of the initial explosion. Volcanic lava was emitted along the Ribeira do Almeida and in Santo Amaro, and there was record of a pyroclastic flow that was responsible for the deaths of at least 10 people. This volcanic eruption lasted four months, and was responsible for many lava flows that travelled to the sea, and ash that fell as far as Terceira. During those months, 4000 cattle died due to gases and the lack of grazing lands, owing to the ash. Eight-years later, several floods would be responsible for the damage to many homes, while in 1593 agricultural production would fall, caused by a bad harvest.

On December 21, 1641, the community of Velas was also the center of an up-well in ocean that '"clawed itself from the sea with such luck that it dominated Monte dos Fachos, with three tides"; this mini-tsunami, although never called this in the literature, caused destruction in the village, injuring 50 people and dragging personal items into the sea.

By 1570, Velas had 1000 inhabitants, and later 2000 by the end of the 17th century. In 1822, there were 4200 residents in this municipality, but slowly these numbers diminished with several phases of emigration.

Piracy had always been a problem in the canal that separated the islands of the central group. Consequently, forts, such as the Fort of Santa Cruz in Velas (1629), another fort in 1641 (later expanded in 1644) and the Fort of Nossa Senhora da Conceição were constructed to impede attacks. In 1647, the residents of the municipality also constructed a lookout in the parish of Manadas to watch for pirates, as well as to intimidate them: the erected a gallows on the site to ward-off potential attackers. On September 18, 1708 a naval squadron, commanded by the French corsair René Duguay-Trouin, that included eight carracks and three other heavily armed ships attacked the town of Velas, after being unable to enter the port. The first direct attack on the villagers was repelled by men under the command of Sergeant-major Amaro Teixeira de Sousa, who was able to thwart a landing on September 19. But, the next day a new attempt was made, wherein one group (that included six boats) was directed at the "doors to the city", while a larger group (that included ten boats) was sent to the Morro das Velas (in the western corner of the village). This second group disembarked near Arco a contingent of 500 men, while killing local residents. The French privateers remained in the village for five days, sacking the churches and main houses. Following this encounter, the residents constructed the Fort of Nossa Senhora do Pilar, also referred to as Castelo da Eira.

In 1647, the parish of Urzelina separated from the parish of Manadas, owing to the existence of its natural port, which was important for the period of the "orange cycle", as well as off-shipment port for Verdelho and Terrenatez wines. Being a new focus of piracy, the citizens of Manadas constructed a gallows on a lookout to "dissuade" pirates. These improvements did not help during that year's earthquake in neighboring Terceira: as a result of the destruction both islands were affected by a period of famine, that was only alleviated through municipal supports.

Between April 23, 1659 and its consecration in February 1675, the Church of São Jorge undertook major renovations, initiated by Father Baltazar Dias Teixeira, under the authority of King D. Afonso VI of Portugal. In order to pay for this re-construction, which would replace a primitive chapel of 1460, the town council initiated an annual tax in 1660, and the actual building began in 1664. The completion of the temple, and its consecration would be presided over by the Bishop of Angra do Heroísmo, D. Lourenço de Castro.

While the taxes imposed on the population were likely an unintended necessity, the famine of 1678, caused by the failure of the cereal crop would lead to minor conflicts between the councils of Pico and São Jorge. Similarly, the Taro Revolt, which started on July 12, 1694 would create internal divisions and tensions between the peasant and administrative classes on the island.

In 1698, the locality of Santo Amaro was elevated to parish status.

During the period of 1713 and 1714 the communities of Velas were affected by both a bad agricultural year and chaotic weather patterns. Famine and disease persisted after a tropical cyclone in late summer (September 25, 1713), which caused "the loss of supplies that caused the deaths of many people from famine". Later, on December 11, 1713, heavy rains in the areas of Urzelina and Rosais caused the destruction of 27 homes; the Ribeira do Almeida (which ran between the village and Queimada) was so heavily inundated with debris that it allowed residents to walk across the field, which was a sheltered bay in other years. A similar disaster was repeated in December 1732, when flooding caused the deaths of five residents and affected the communities of Urzelina, Figueiras, Serroa and Velas. But, in 1755, at the same time that the Lisbon earthquake affected the Portuguese capital, a tsunami reached the southern coasts of the islands of the Azores. The southern ports and communities of Velas attacked by successive waves, destroying personal possessions and homes. Two years later, the Mandado de Deus ("The Sent of God") resulted in landslides, destruction of homes and many deaths. The earthquake was known for damaging the Church of Santa Bárbara in Manadas, specifically (in 1770 it was declared a National Monument by royal decree of King D. Sebastião, since it was constructed in 1485).

The latter part of the 18th century, in addition to the reconstruction of many of the older temples (caused by the 1757 earthquake), was a period of many public works. In Manadas, the cornerstone for chapel of Santa Rita de Cássia was laid in 1757, while in 1762 the Church of Nossa Senhora dos Neves over the older 17th-century chapel was constructed.

== Geography ==
=== Physical geography ===
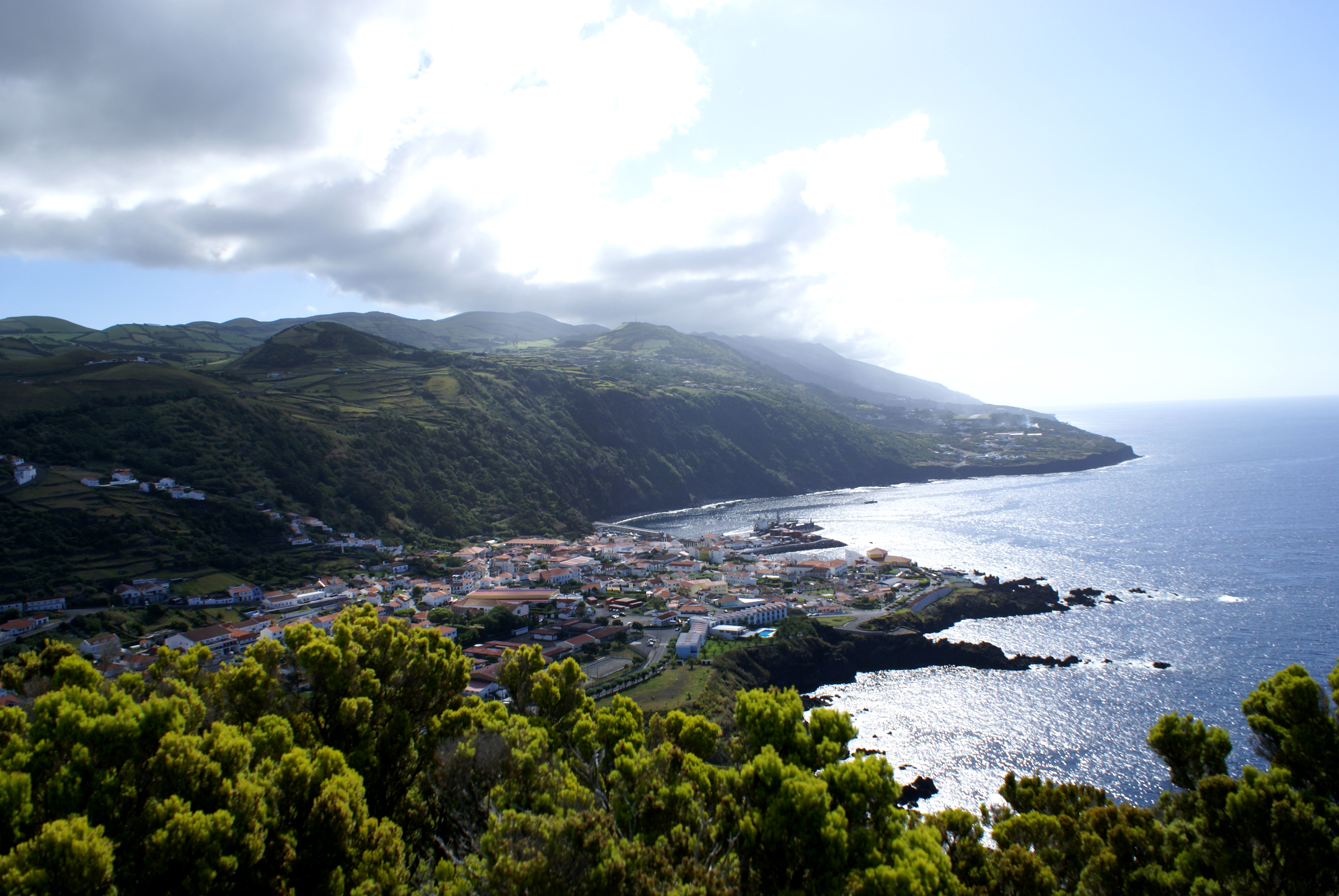
Partial vista of the town of Velas, showing the southern coast and village of Urzelina in the distance, São Jorge

The municipality of Velas occupies half the island of São Jorge, from the northwest coast to the interior around Pico Gordo. It is coincident with the Western regional geomorphological zone from Ponta dos Rosais until approximately the area of Ribeira Seca, and characterized by a cascade of escoria cones and axial deposits that extend along the plateau, formed from fissural volcanism that originates in faults extending from the center of the island which run parallel along a north-northwest to south-southeast axis. A secondary range of faults also extend slightly to the area around the town of Velas. The progress of fissural volcanism runs along these accesses, and has resulted in volcanic features that are younger than the rest of the island; two volcanic complexes have their origin in Velas: the Volcanic Complex of Rosais (which is less than 10 million years in age) and the Volcanic Complex of Manadas (the older system which is between 10 and 600 million years in age). This has resulted in vistas that are exemplified by high coastal cliffs and central plateau dotted by several spatter cones along the center, as well as fajãs (geological debris fields or coastal deltas). The largest fajã, which extends from the geological cones of Morro de Lemos and Morre Grande to the Bay of Velas, is occupied by the principal population center, the town of Velas.

=== Human geography ===
Typically, the municipality is circled by the western branch of the Regional E.R.1-1ª roadway that connects several of the main settled areas on this side of the island: in addition to the urbanized are of Velas, the western plateau is interrupted by the communities of São Pedro, Ribeirinho, Canadinha Nova, Arrifana, Rosais, Loural, Santo António, Norte Grande, Outeiro, Ribeira da Areia, Ladeiras, Manadas, Urzelina, Biscoitos, Boa Hora, Morgadias and Santo Amaro. The extreme coastal communities are relatively detached from the rest of these settlements, and include Fajã da Ribeira Areia, Fajá do Ouvidor (the only fajã with road access), Fajã de Além, Fajã Rasa, Fajã do Centelo, Fajã do João Dias and Fajã das Almas. Administratively, the municipality of Velas encompasses six civil parishes (or freguesias) that operate day-to-day functions, while Velas handles municipal services such as development, water, electricity, public administration, security and civil institutions. The six parishes of the municipality are:

- Manadas - located along the southern, with a population of less than 400 inhabitants, also known as the parish of Santa Bárbara;
- Norte Grande - on the border with Calheta, along the north coast, the small parish (688 inhabitants) is known for its two fajãs: Fajã da Aeira and Fajã do Ouvidor;
- Rosais - the parish that occupies the western point of the island of São Jorge, it includes Ponta dos Rosais, and has a population of 820 residents in 2001;
- Santo Amaro - neighboring the parish of Velas, it is the location of the island's airport with approximately 920 inhabitants in 2001;
- Urzelina - site of the 1808 volcanic eruption that erupted from the center of the parish, and cascaded to the sea; today the parish is population of approximately 866 inhabitants;
- Velas - the parish that includes the town of Velas, as well as the settlements along the Canadinha Nova and Ribeirinho, and includes 1929 residents.

== Notable people ==
- José Avelino Bettencourt, (1962) Head of Protocol of Secretariat of State of the Holy See
