= Fajã do Belo =

- Fajã
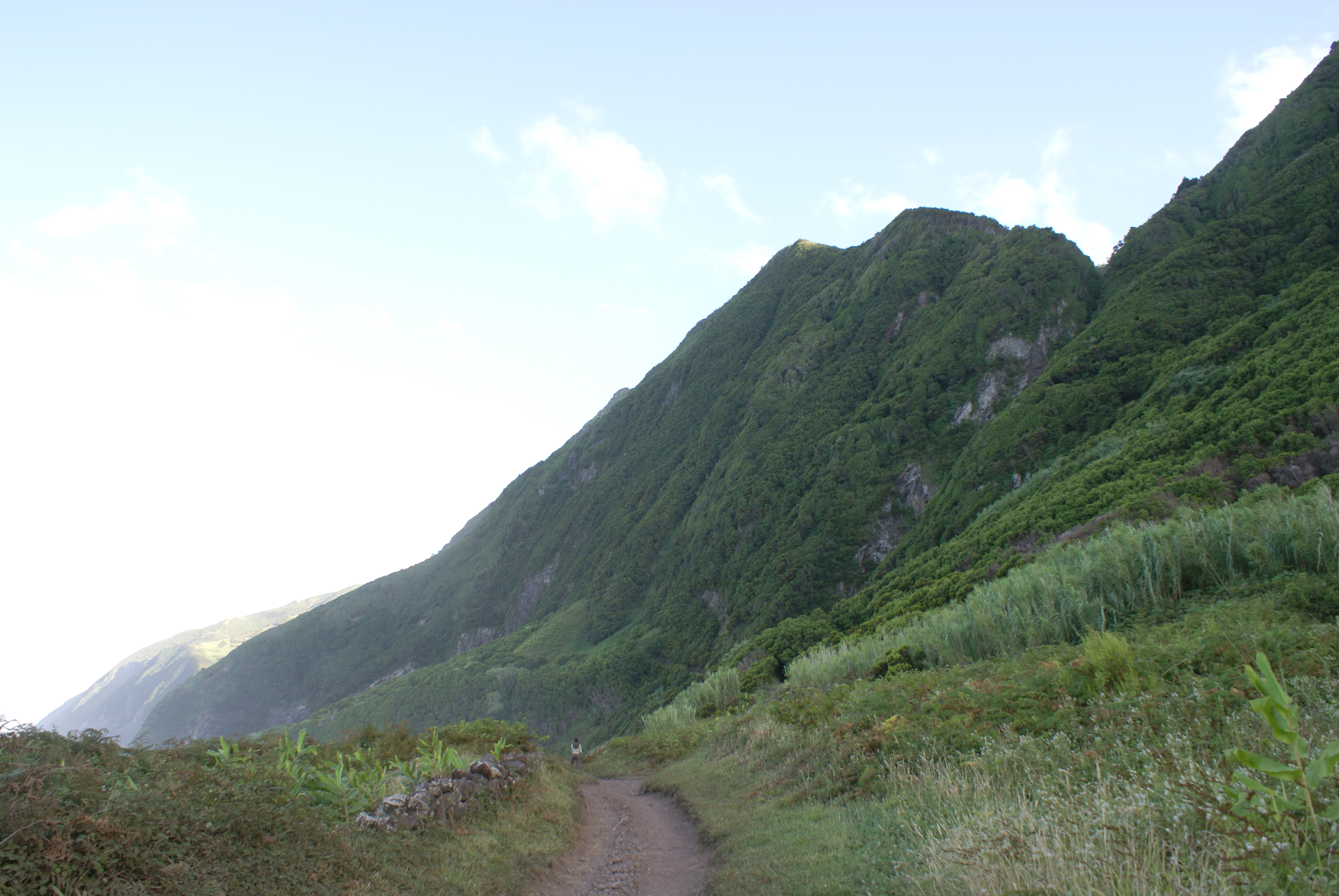
- The seemingly abandoned stretch of the fajã and access

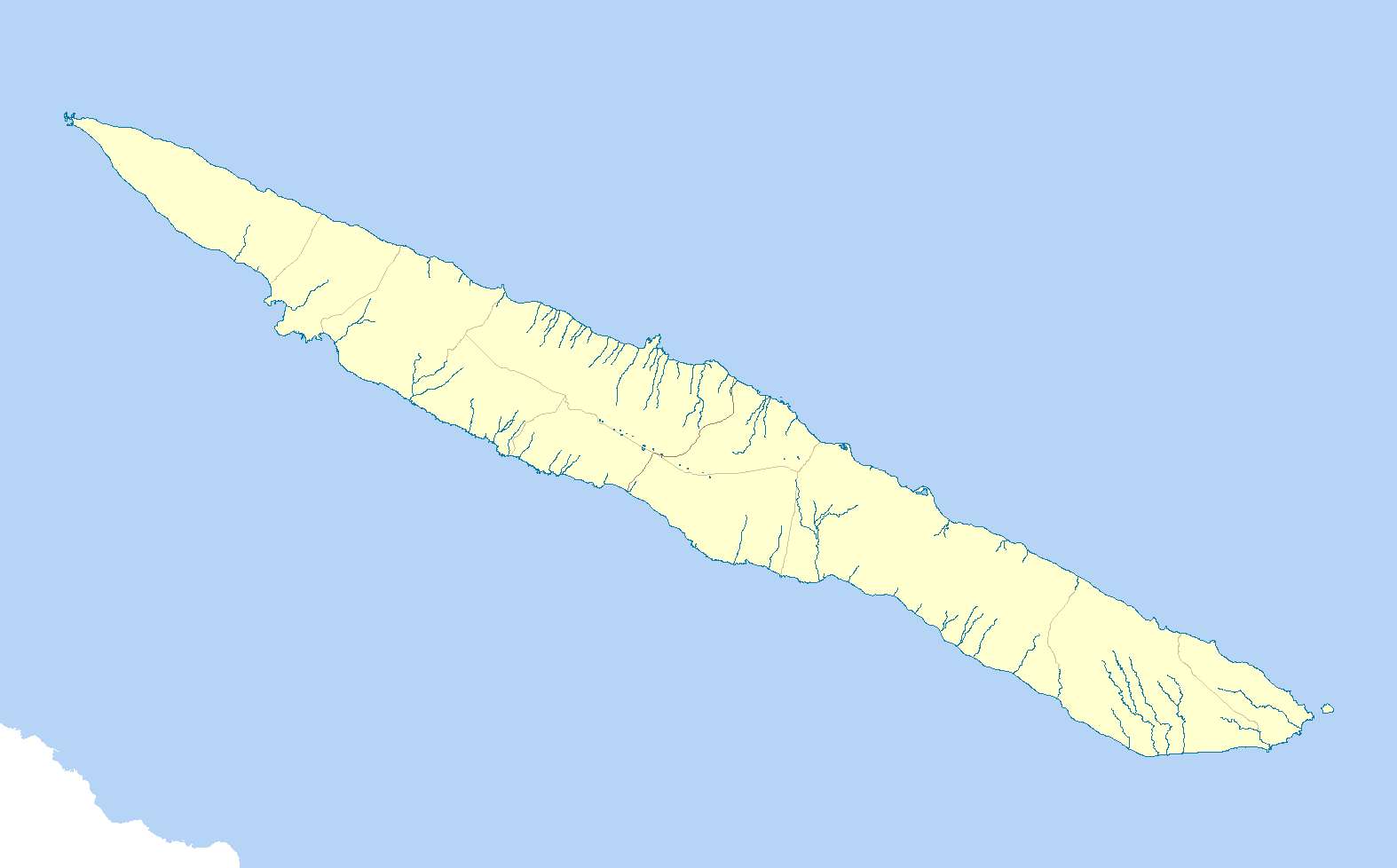
- Location within São Jorge
- Coordinates: 38°37′52″N 27°56′35″W
- Location: Ribeira Seca, São Jorge Island
- Access: Accessible by foot, yet restricted during periods of unfavourable weather

The Fajã do Belo is a permanent debris field, known as a fajã, built from the collapsing cliffs on the northern coast of the civil parish of Ribeira Seca, in the municipality of Calheta, island of São Jorge, in the Portuguese archipelago of the Azores.

== History ==
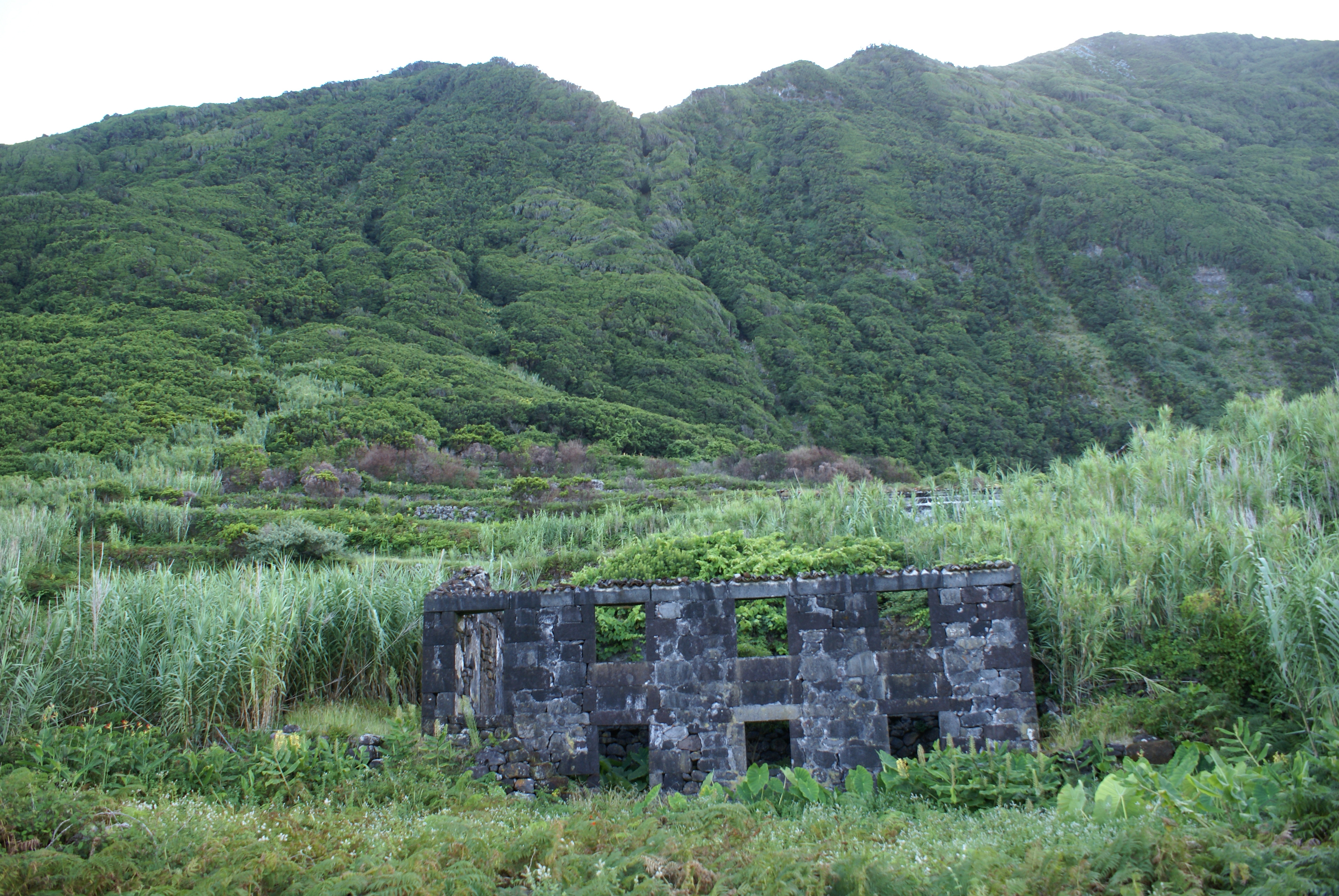
Following the 1980 Azores earthquake many of the buildings/homes were abandoned

First known in the 17th century, this small agglomeration of houses was named for one of its first settlers: Diogo Nunes Belo. Since its early settlement, the inhabitants of the fajã were occupied in subsistence agriculture and raising of cattle. At the time this included cultivation of vineyards, lupin bean and sweet potato, while seaweed/algae was used as fertilizer.

By 1891, there were 131 residents inhabiting the fajã.

Following the 1980 earthquake, there was a landslide and rockfalls, resulting in damage to the cliffs. On this occasion 22 people resided in settlement, but moved to nearby settlements following the events: 30 years after the events of 1980 the area was abandoned.

== Geography ==
Situated between the Fajã dos Cubres and Fajã dos Tijolos, Belo is a small debris field built from landslides forming a coastal plain. Access to this fajã is conditioned by weather, and vehicles are not permitted on the dirt trails, resulting in mostly pedonal or quad traffic.

The lands are relatively fertile and support grazing of cattle and cultivation of sweet potatoes and supporting small vineyards. Some fishing continues to occur offshore.

== See also ==
- List of fajãs in the Azores
