= Taro Revolt =

17th-century peasant conflicts on the island of São Jorge

The Taro Revolt (Portuguese: Revolta dos Inhames), or the Taro Mutiny (Portuguese: Motim dos Inhames), is the name given to the 17th-century peasant conflicts that occurred on the island of São Jorge—particularly the municipality of Calheta, in the parishes of Ribeira Seca and Norte Pequeno—in protest to the annual payment of tithes for the production of taro, a green-stalk plant whose root was used as a food source throughout the Azores.

== History ==
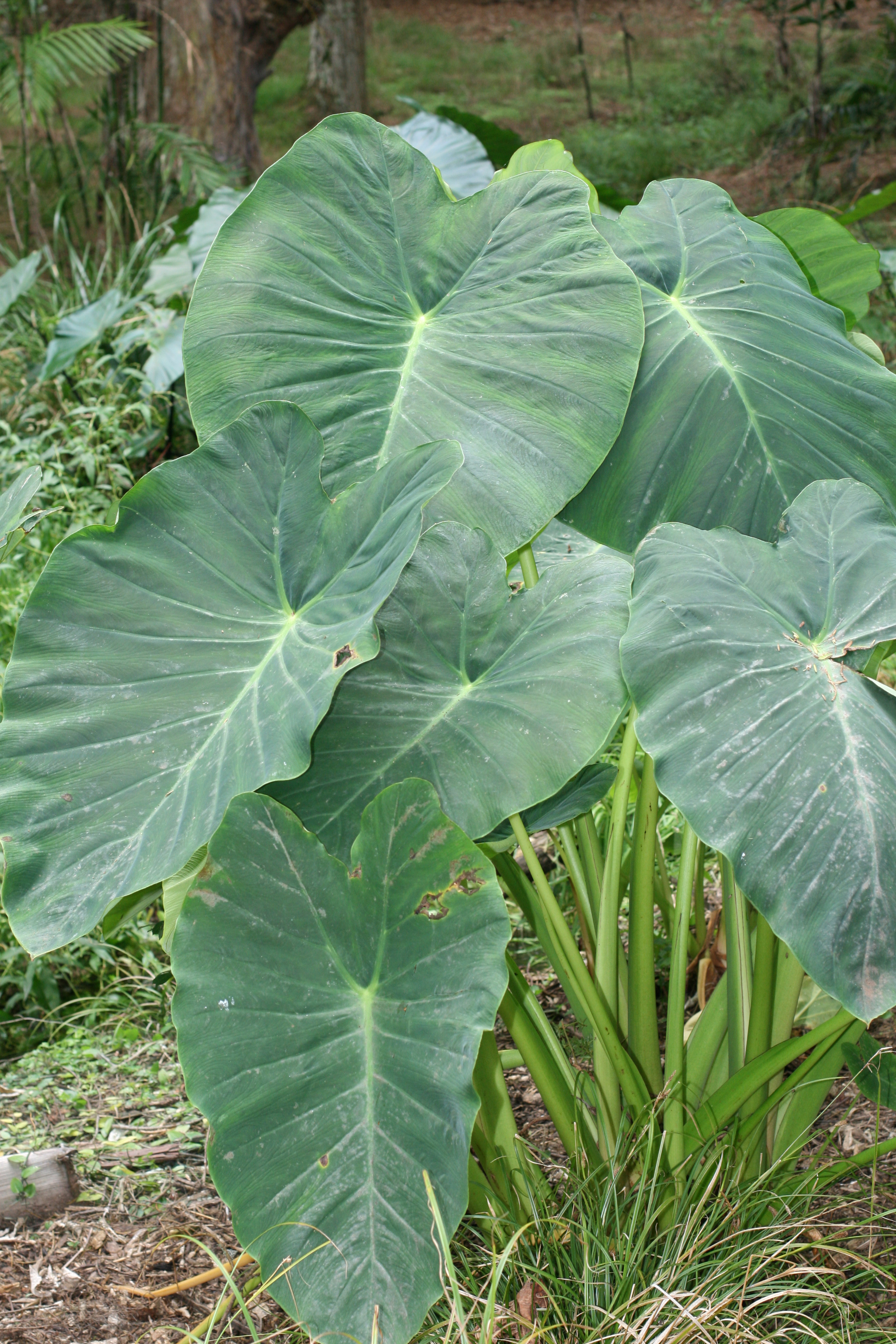
The leafy stalks of the taro plant; the corms are the edible root of this plant

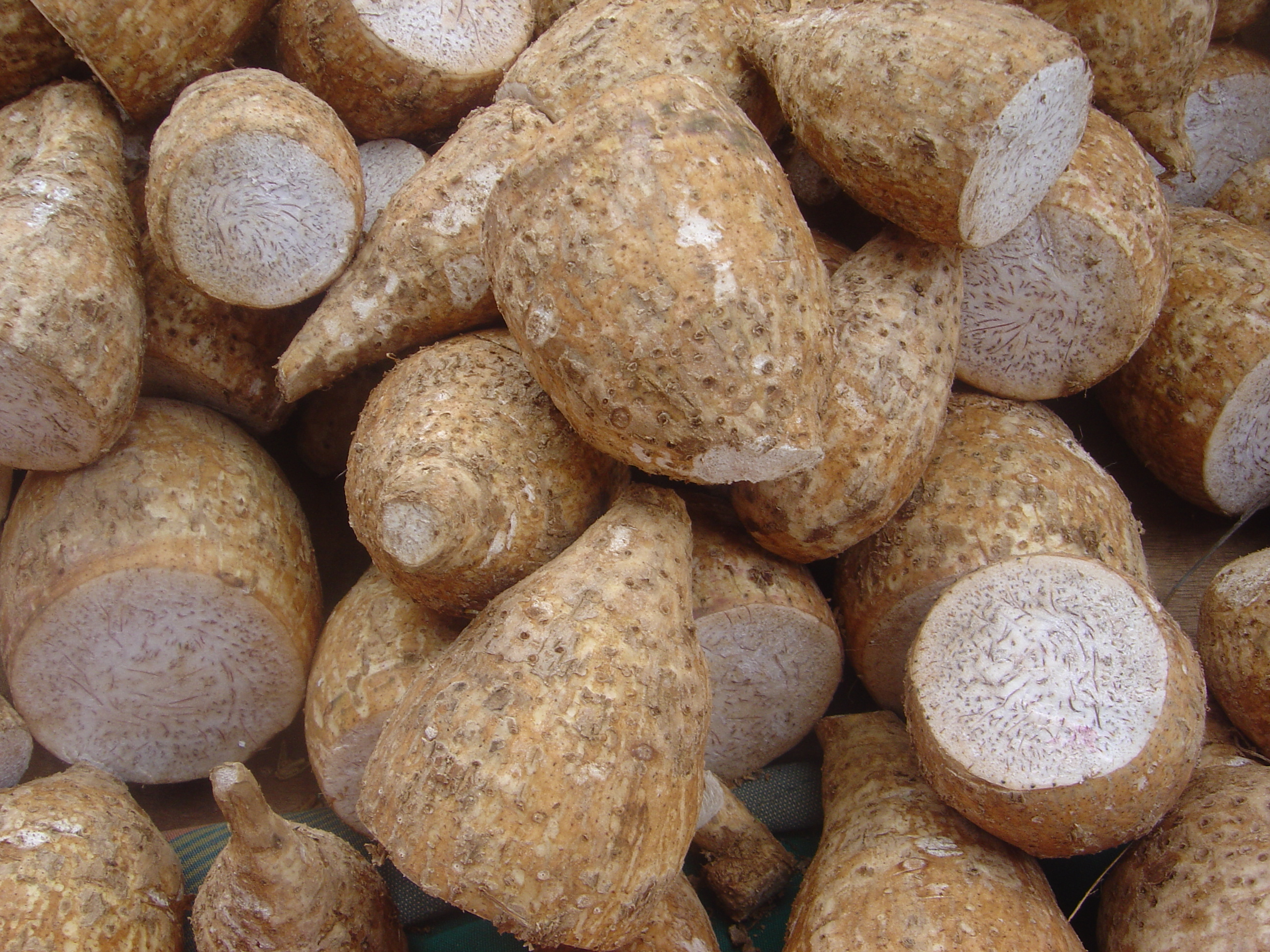
Corms of taro, sold in the local markets of the Azores

The taro (Colocasia esculenta), referred to in the Azores as inhames or coco in Portuguese, is cultivated in many islands of the archipelago. It was first introduced onto the island of São Jorge during the 17th century, probably from Southeast Asia, and became popular with the peasant class. Given its nutritional importance, taro was planted in peasant gardens to stave off food crises and famine; in periods when crops failed, the taro was used to supplant local sources of protein.

On the eastern coast, which is characterized by the plain of Serra do Topo (800 m above sea level) and almost constantly covered in thick fog, made it difficult to cultivate cereal crops. This was usually confined to a narrow platform that circuited the village of Topo and the lower portion of Santo Antão. These were ideal conditions, with their ravines and rugged valleys, that allowed the cultivation of taro, which assumed a dominant part of the local agriculture and economy. The taro was usually cultivated along the margins of the fields that were seeded with cereal crops and provided a guaranteed source of proteins for local settlers, until the potato was introduced later in the century. The plant occupied areas with abundant sources of water and could tolerate areas of shade, and were therefore ideal in the fajãs, ravines and valleys, taking advantage of access to water and waterfalls. On São Jorge, in particular, the coastal debris fields (the fajãs) were ideal along the southern coast of the island. Today, there still exist some plants in these zones and especially in those areas that have since been abandoned by human settlement, but yet wild plants have survived.

Culturally, some locals would refer to residents near taro fields as inhameiros ("taro-fielders"), the leaves of the taro figure prominently on the coat-of-arms of the municipality of Calheta and the heraldry of the civil parish of Ribeira Seca, the locality at the center of the leader of the Taro Revolt.

== Increased taxation ==
The costs associated with the Portuguese Restoration War could not be eliminated through the increase in standard taxation, which was primarily centered on products of greater value, such as cereals or meats. Therefore, the crown looked to other mechanisms to generate new financial income and expanded the number of products that were taxable, in order to expand this revenue stream.

The new tax, the dízimo das miunças e ervagens ("Tithe on Miunças and Greens"), was such a new tax: it imposed a tax on one-tenth of all green plants, including those for animal consumption (as well as the cattle) and other smaller agricultural products. The tax, which lasted until the establishment of the Liberal Constitution of 1822, was the norm, and established payment to the Royal coffers in taro, which would be sold by administers to fill the public finances. The payment was generally repudiated by all, but in general by commercial traders and capitalists from Lisbon, who extorted payment from their clients. This discontent extend to many of the peasant class, who had hopes that the Restoration would bring prosperity, but were excluded from lands by aristocratic fiefdoms of Lisbon nobility. In some parishes, what few lands were available were those in ravines and cliffs, where the taro could be cultivated. This discontentment increased in the latter half of the 17th century, creating the conditions for conflict that only required a match.

Considered food of the peasants, it was never subject to a tithe, until the population of the municipalities of Calheta and Topo were informed that they were to begin paying the tax on the root-vegetable. Many did not pay, and the situation began to fester. In 1692, Francisco Lopes Beirão set the tithe for three years to 415$000 Portuguese real, and instructed his agents to "squeeze" peasants for the payment, as well as the costs associated with the transport of the tuber from field to the collection site.

This final insult (transport) inflamed the farmers: the transport of taro, from the fajãs to settlements, required the scaling of 500-600 meter vertical cliffs, along trails that were better suited to goats than humans. Further, other taxes were payable at the location of the farmer: the wheat tithe at the threshing floor, the corn tithe at each parcel of land, and the viticulture tithe at the pressing stone. This stipulation obligated the farmers to transport sacks of taro on their backs (which was common for the poor) from the fajãs where the root was harvested, to the settlements on the São Jorge plateau.

== Revolt of July 1694 ==
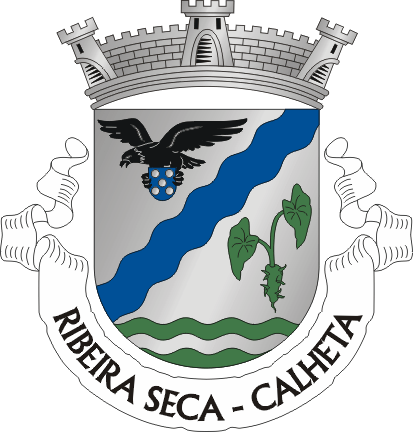
Coat of Arms of Ribeira Seca, showing the taro plant

In this context, in an indignant environment, on July 21, 1694, Amaro Soares de Sousa, Sergeant-major of the municipality of Velas, appeared at the town council of Calheta, requesting more than 150 residents from the municipality of Calheta, for their failure to pay the tithe for 1692, 1693 and 1694. In November, residents in the community of Ribeira da Areia in the civil parish of Norte Grande, Velas (which also pertained to the neighboring municipality of Calheta) appeared at the town council in Calheta. These inhabitants protested to the council officials that they were being intimidated, while others were arrested, by men sent by the sheriff of Velas. This was considered an intolerable interference in the municipal independence of Calheta: the magistrate and Captain-major in Calheta immediately ordered a squadron of soldiers to expel the invaders.

By the time the contingent had arrived from Calheta, Father Manuel Luís Maldonado, writing in the newspaper Fenix Angrence noted,

"I passed the sheriff with forty men for the church square of Calheta, as they were arresting a few of the responsible a group, when barbarous and disorderly people rose-up, and it was necessary that they retreated to the Church of Nossa Senhora das Neves...as they [the mob] circled, they clambered that they should set a fire and breakdown the doors with machetes...the vicar attempted to calm them, but was only successful when first the prisoners were released...they formed two companies, under two captains, exclaiming that they should not pay the tithe without His Majesty ordering them by special mandate."

Father João de Sousa Pacheco, then vicar of Norte Grande, ran to the Church and was able to calm the population, and burned the list of all those who were intimidated in public. With this act, the authorities from Velas were ordered to return to their home, and subject was supposedly closed.

== Judicial Intervention ==
For many Jorgense, they believed that their actions would not have any consequences and that they were victory had stopped the imposition of the tax. In truth, Francisco Lopes Beirão was informed of the actions taken against his agents, and appealed to the King. In a letter dated June 16, 1695, the King sent magistrate João de Soveral e Barbuda to the island of São Jorge in order to apprehend and sentence the responsible parties.

Barbuda left in August 1695, and established his residence on the island of Faial and began his investigations. Owing to Jorgense resistance, in the spring of 1696 he solicited from military governor at the Castle of São João Baptista on Monte Brasil, in the city of Angra, troops to put-down the rebellion. The governor sent 50 soldiers from Terceira, and placed them in the hands of the magistrate.

Accompanied by this military force, Barbuda began in Velas (on June 22, 1696) a campaign of summary arrests and interrogations, establishing a rigorous prosecution and review of the events. Among those questioned were the Sheriff and Sergeant-major of Velas, as well as the Captain-major, councilmen, and judges of Calheta. The inquiry determined that the rebels, in addition to the authorities in Calheta (who had defended their revolt) were culpable. Considered the leader of the revolt, Gonçalo Pereira Machado, the respected Captain-major of Calheta and resident of Ribeira Seca was convicted and sentenced to the Limoeiro prison in Lisbon. The judges and councilmen of Calheta were also blamed for the defiance, although many escaped the sentence of the courts. As a general blanket coverage, the magistrate also considered the residents of the villa of Topo (which then included the parish of Santo Antão), the villagers of Calheta and those northern parishes (Norte Grande and Norte Pequeno) involved in the riot duplicitous in the events that occurred.

== Consequences ==
Although some escaped, their property and the possessions of the convicted were seized to pay the tithe, as well as the expenses of the soldiers, the magistrate, judges, as well as the transport and lodging of the latter servants of the Crown. Consequently, many of the responsible parties were ruined: they were required to sell all their possessions in order to pay compensation, and those who failed were imprisoned in the Castle of São João Baptista, the prison in Angra or the jail in Horta, where many of them were to die of disease, famine or despair.

As a consequence of the Taro Revolt, relations between the Jorgense municipalities became tense while inter-island relationships expanded: Calheta and Topo were polarized towards Angra, while Velas became a satellite of the city of Horta. Those residents who were impoverished by the taxation, were profoundly affected by successive crop failures and famines that occurred on the island, and many were forced to emigrate to Brazil or the United States.

The revolt was a low point in community life for the Jorgense population, and is remembered primarily in the coat-of-arms of some of the administrative centers.
