= Cume da Fajã do Belo =

Mountain on São Jorge Island in the Azores

Coordinates: 38.6248°N 27.9532°W

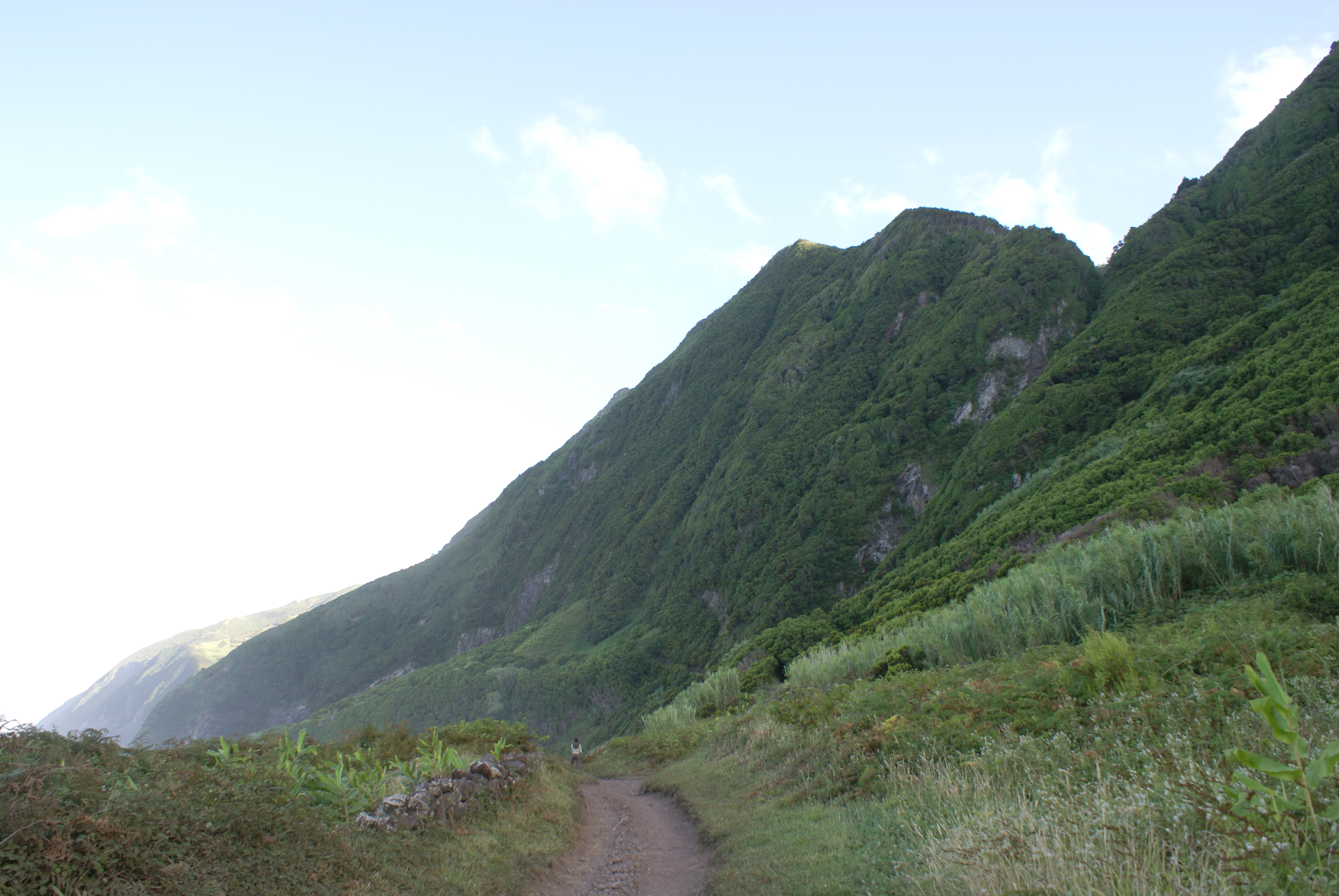
Fajã do Belo

Cume da Fajã do Belo is a mountain on the north of the island of São Jorge Island in the Azores, 769 metres (2,523 ft) above sea level. It stands northeast of the village Ribeira Seca and southeast of the village Norte Pequeno. The debris field Fajã do Belo lies to the north, on the coast.
