= Solar de Santo António =

Manor of Santo António
- Solar de Santo António
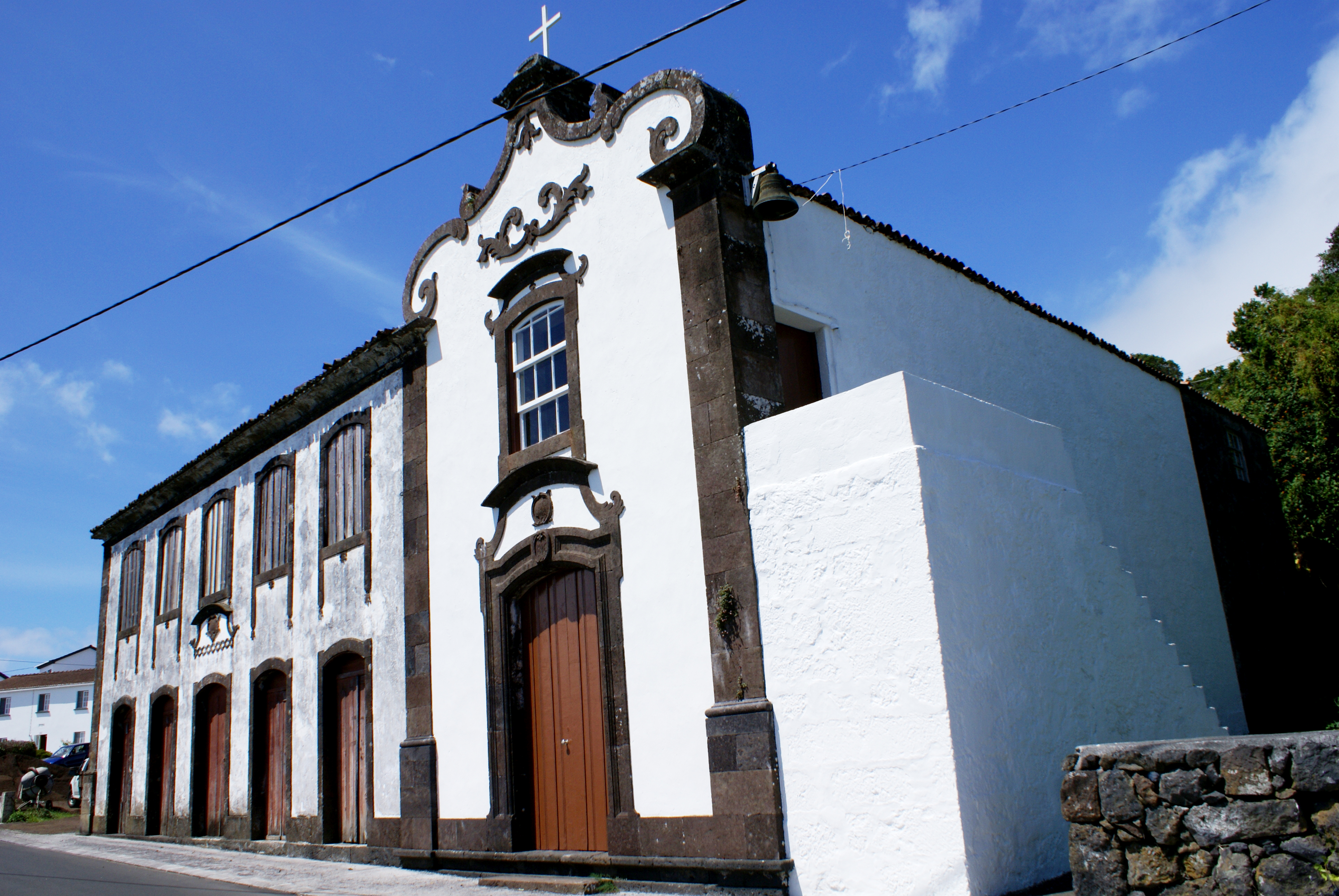
- Manorhouse and chapel of Santo António along the regional roadway

General information
- Type: Manorhouse
- Architectural style: Baroque
- Location: Calheta, Portugal
- Opened: 16th century
- Owner: Portuguese Republic

Technical details
- Material: Basalt

The Manor of Santo António (Portuguese: Solar de Santo António) is a Portuguese manor house situated along the regional roadway of the civil parish of Ribeira Seca (Calheta) in the municipality of Calheta, on the island of São Jorge, archipelago of the Azores.

== Architecture ==
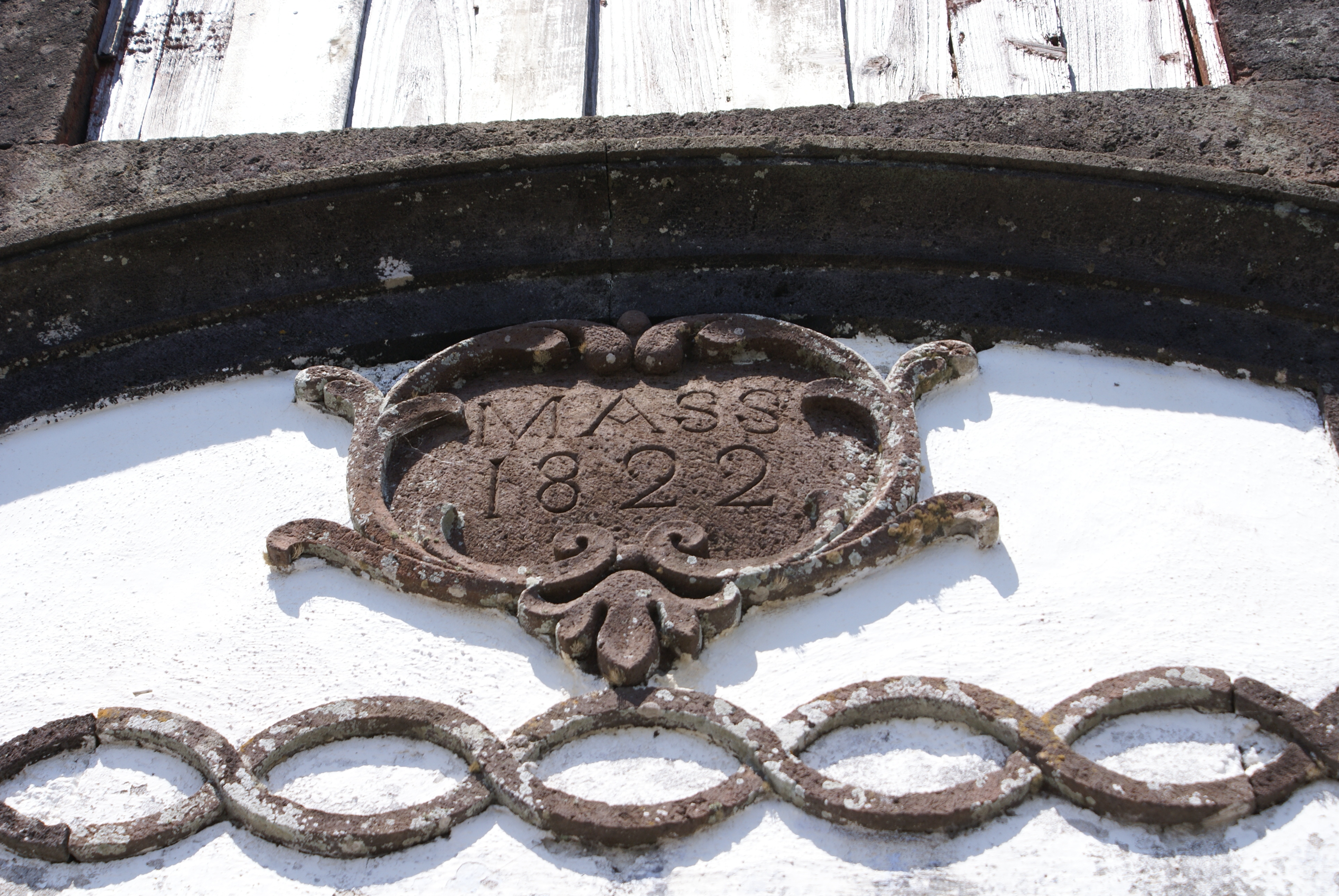
Inscription in relief over the entranceway to the two-story manor house of Santo António.

The manor house is made of black basalt stone, while its windows and doors are made with raised frames.

Over the main doorway of the manor house is the inscription "MASS 1822", dating the building's period of construction.

Attached to the manor house is the Hermitage of Santo António, which was constructed in 1816.
