= Fajã dos Tijolos =

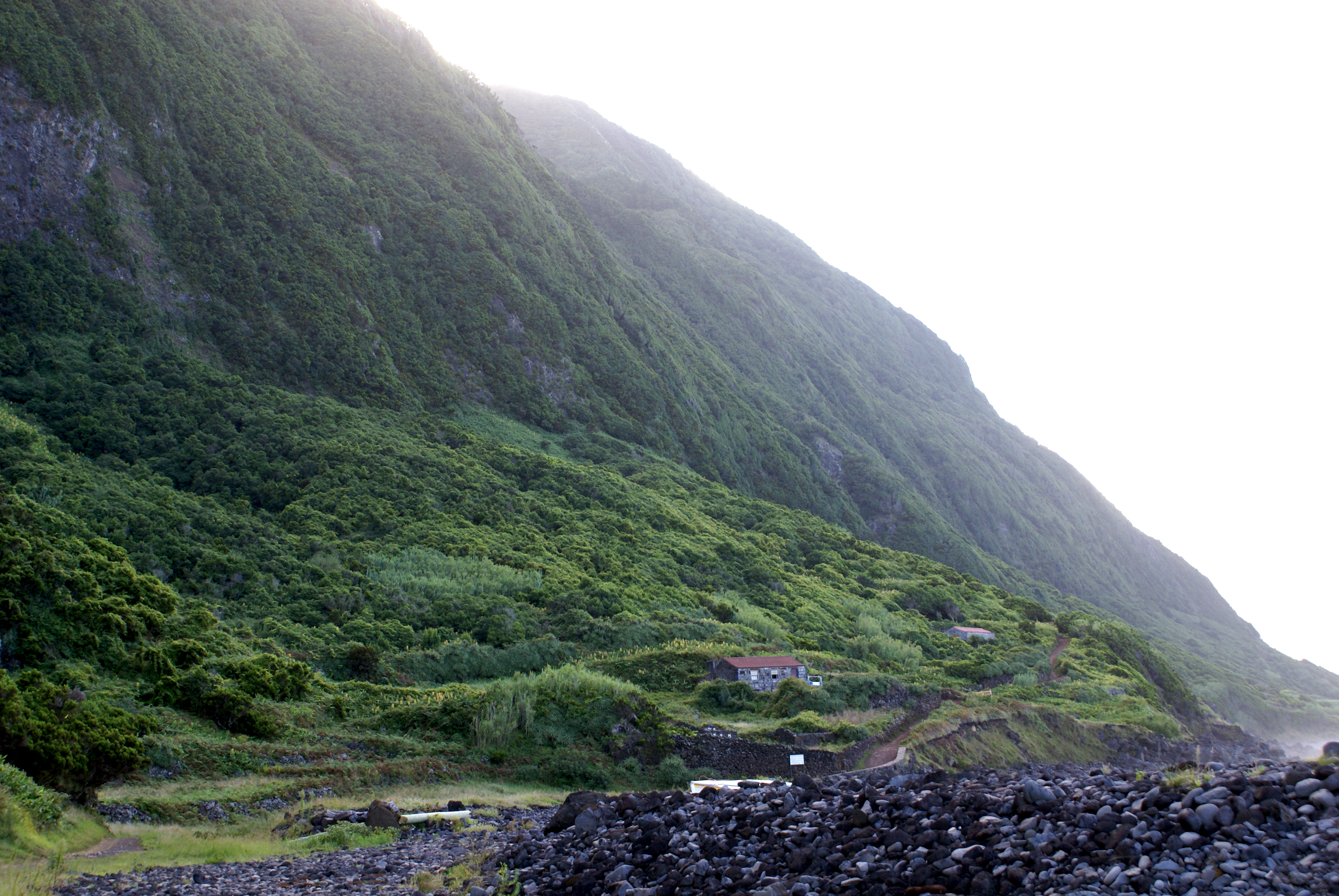
- Interactive map of Fajã dos Tijolos
- Location: São Jorge, Central, Azores, Portugal
- Coordinates: 38°37′38″N 27°56′13″W
- Visitors: Accessible by foot, yet restricted during periods of inclement weather
- Geographic detail from Portuguese Army map

The Fajã dos Tijolos (Portuguese for "debris field of the bricks") is a permanent debris field, built from the collapsing cliffs on the northern coast of the civil parish of Ribeira Seca, in the municipality of Calheta, island of São Jorge, in the Portuguese archipelago of the Azores.

Fajã dos Tijolos is located along a narrow trail that links Fajã do Belo and Fajã da Caldeira de Santo Cristo, but was also linked by a lagoon that connected the two fajãs.

Owing to the geodynamic nature of the coast, the lagoon became divided in two and eventually dried-up.

The residents of this fajã lived an isolated existence dedicated to agriculture and fishing, cultivating small vineyards, parcels with tarot, corn, greens, potatoes, onions, garlic and figs. Until it dried-up, the small lagoon permitted small fishing, while fisherman took their boats to the waters edge at the local boat ramp, which provided access to the cobblestone beach and bay. The raising of cattle also helped to support the small community.

== See also ==
- List of fajãs in the Azores
