= Fajã dos Cubres =

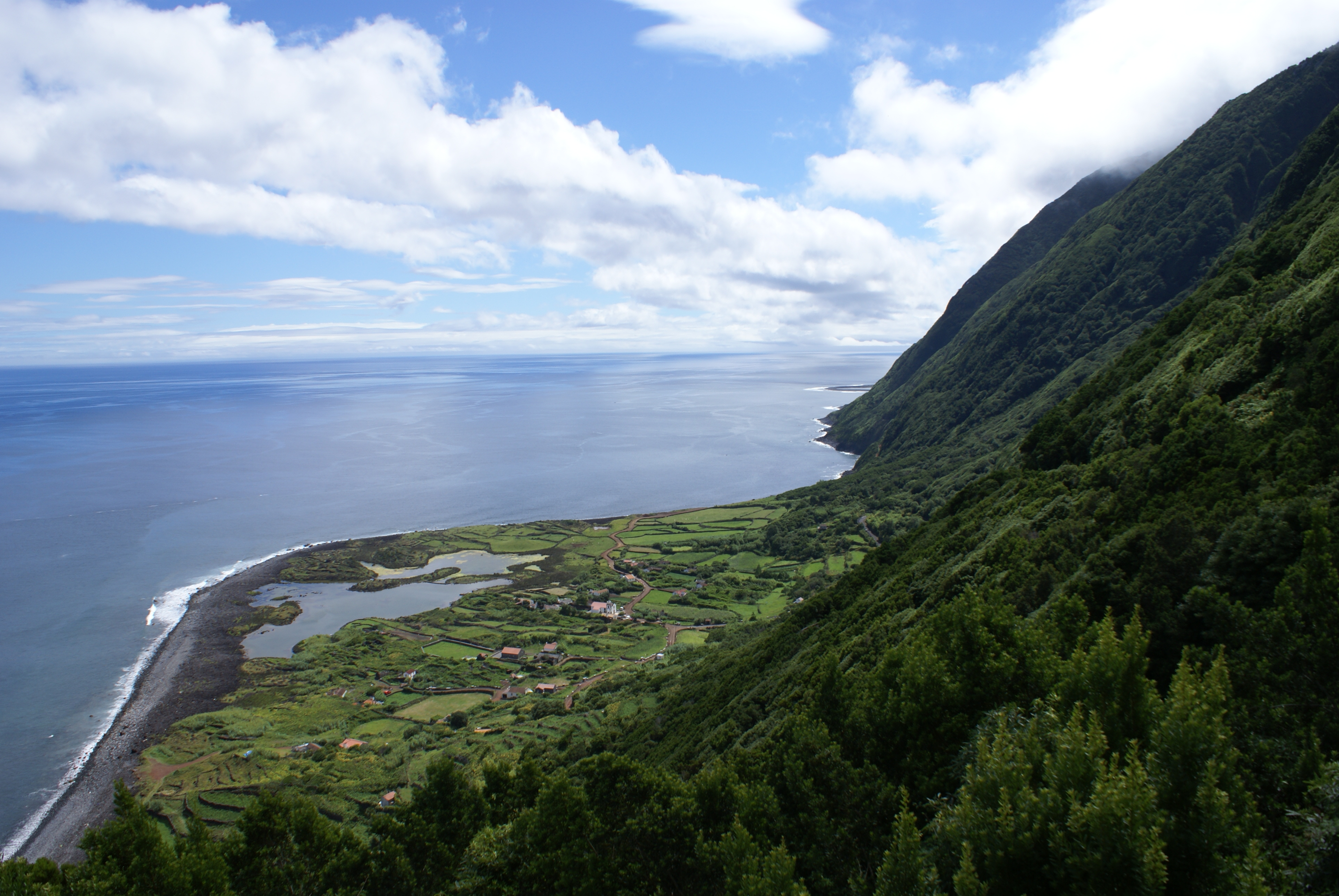
- Fajã dos Cubres and the cliffs that lie on its origin
- Interactive map of Fajã dos Cubres
- Location: Ribeira Seca, São Jorge, Central Group, Azores, Portugal
- Coordinates: 38°38′27″N 27°58′3″W
- Area: .75 km^{2} (0.29 sq mi)
- Named for: Solidago sempervirens (seaside goldenrod)
- Visitors: Open, yet restricted during periods of inclimate weather
- Geographic detail from Portuguese Army map

The Fajã dos Cubres is a permanent debris field, known as a fajã, built from the collapsing cliffs on the northern coast of the civil parish of Ribeira Seca, in the municipality of Calheta, island of São Jorge, in the Portuguese archipelago of the Azores.

== History ==
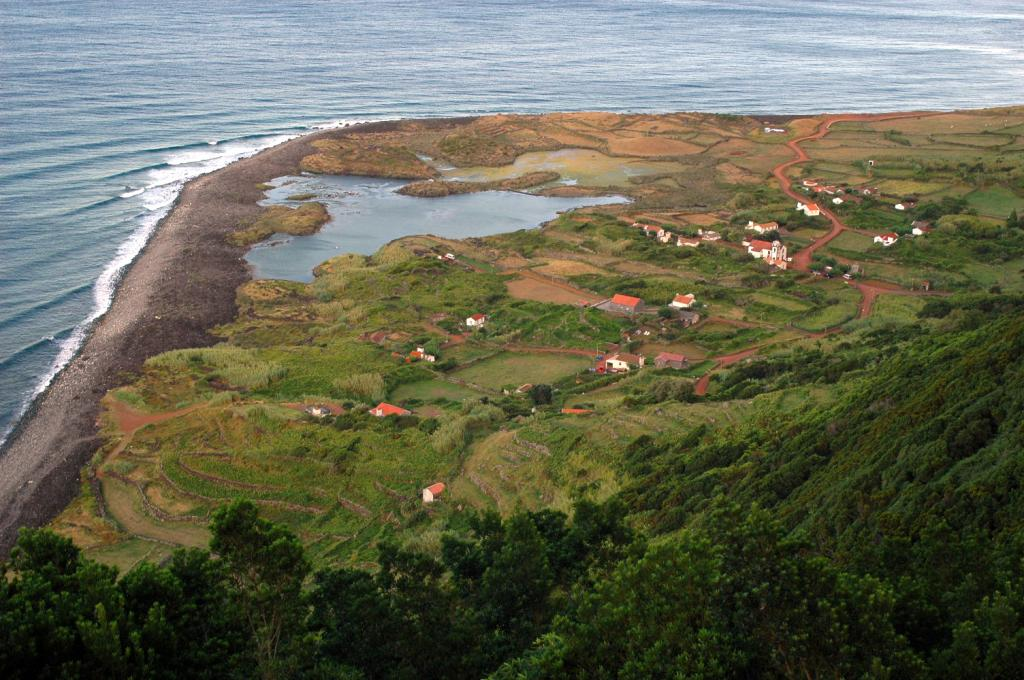
A glimpse of the lagoon and settlement of Fajã dos Cubres

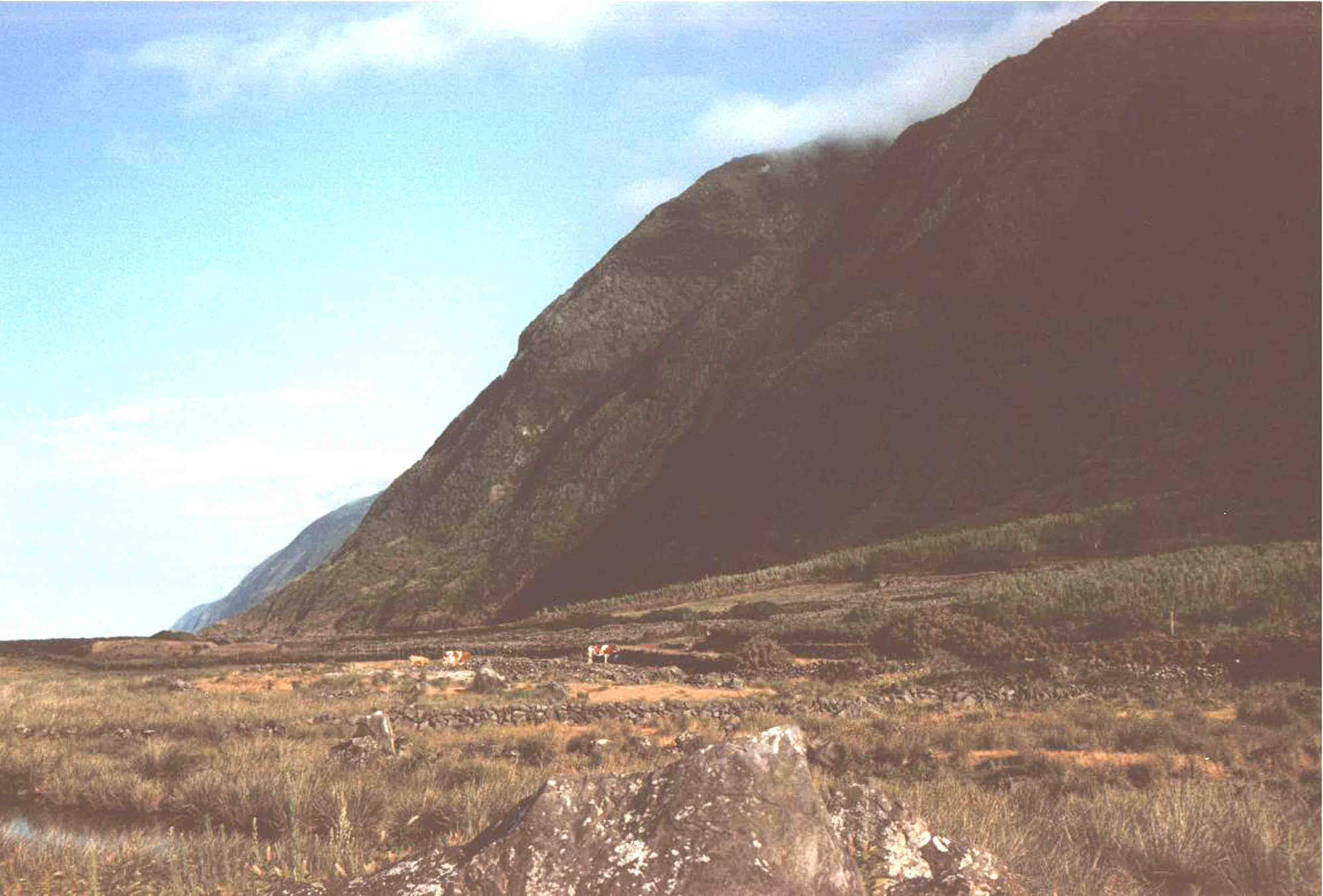
A view of the cliffs that overhang the fajã with cattle

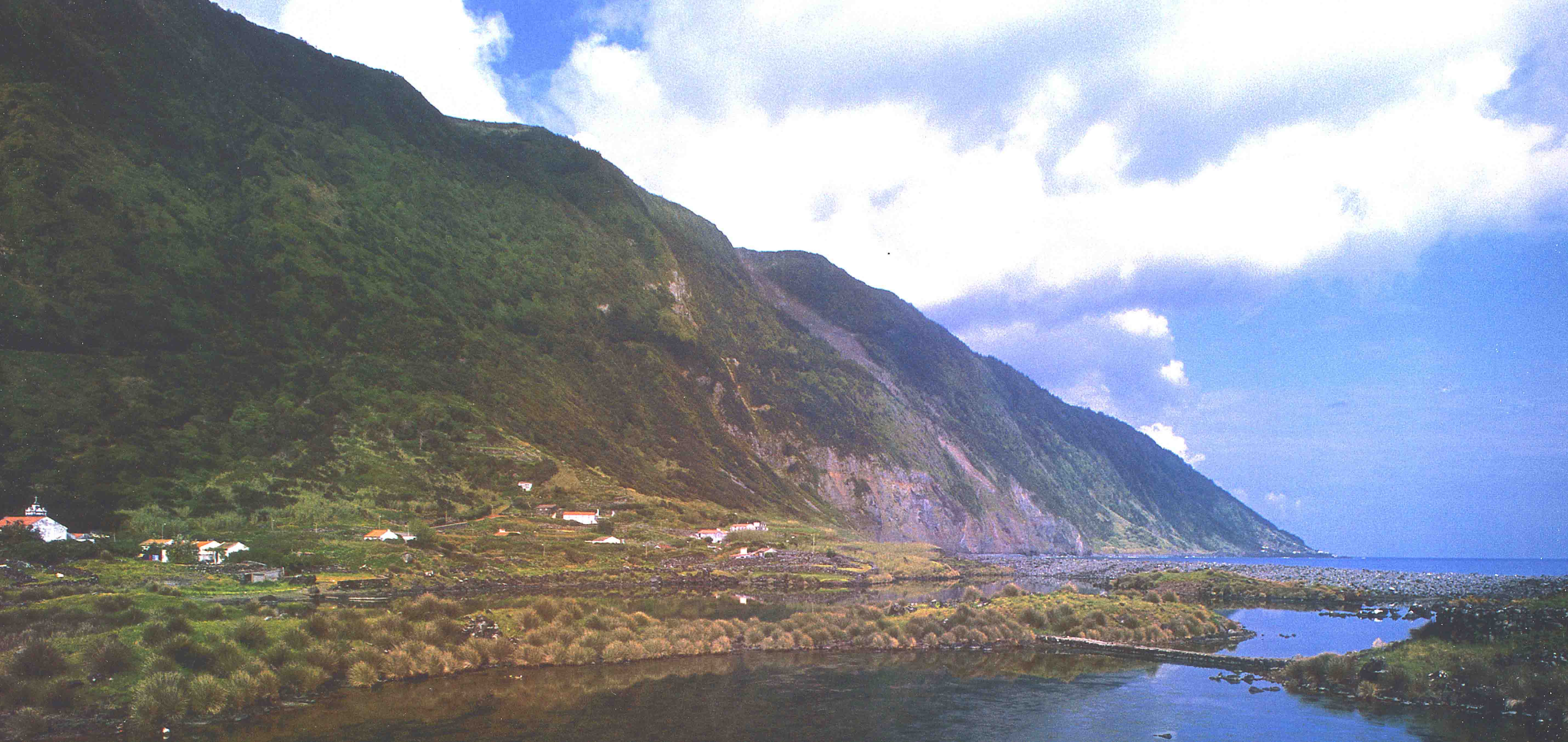
An older view of the settlement and lagoon of Fajã dos Cubres

The spit received its name from the seaside goldenrod (Solidago azorica), a small yellow flowering plant, that is common to the fajã. This species, common along the eastern coast of the United States, spread throughout many of the islands of the archipelago.

The size of the fajã has been attributed to the 9 July 1757 earthquake, considered the most violent tectonic quake that occurred in the Azores. This seismic event was characterized by violent movements of land (landslides, collapses and rockfalls) that were responsible for the creation of several fajãs on the island, such as the Fajã of Ponta Nova, and the growth of pre-existing fajãs. The event, and associated aftershocks, were responsible for the destruction in Fajã dos Vimes, Fajã do São João and Fajã dos Cúberes, where "it moved the land, from the centre above, with luck, in them, there is no sign of buildings." The earthquake produced major damage in Calheta and caused the death of 1034 on the island of São Jorge.

The Hermitage of Nossa Senhora das Lurdes was open to the faithful on 18 October 1908. It was offered to the public by António Faustino Nunes, a native of this fajã and later emigrant to California. To the rear of the church is a tidal well, who some believed its waters were considered miraculous.

During the 1980 earthquake several buildings were damaged.

== Geography ==
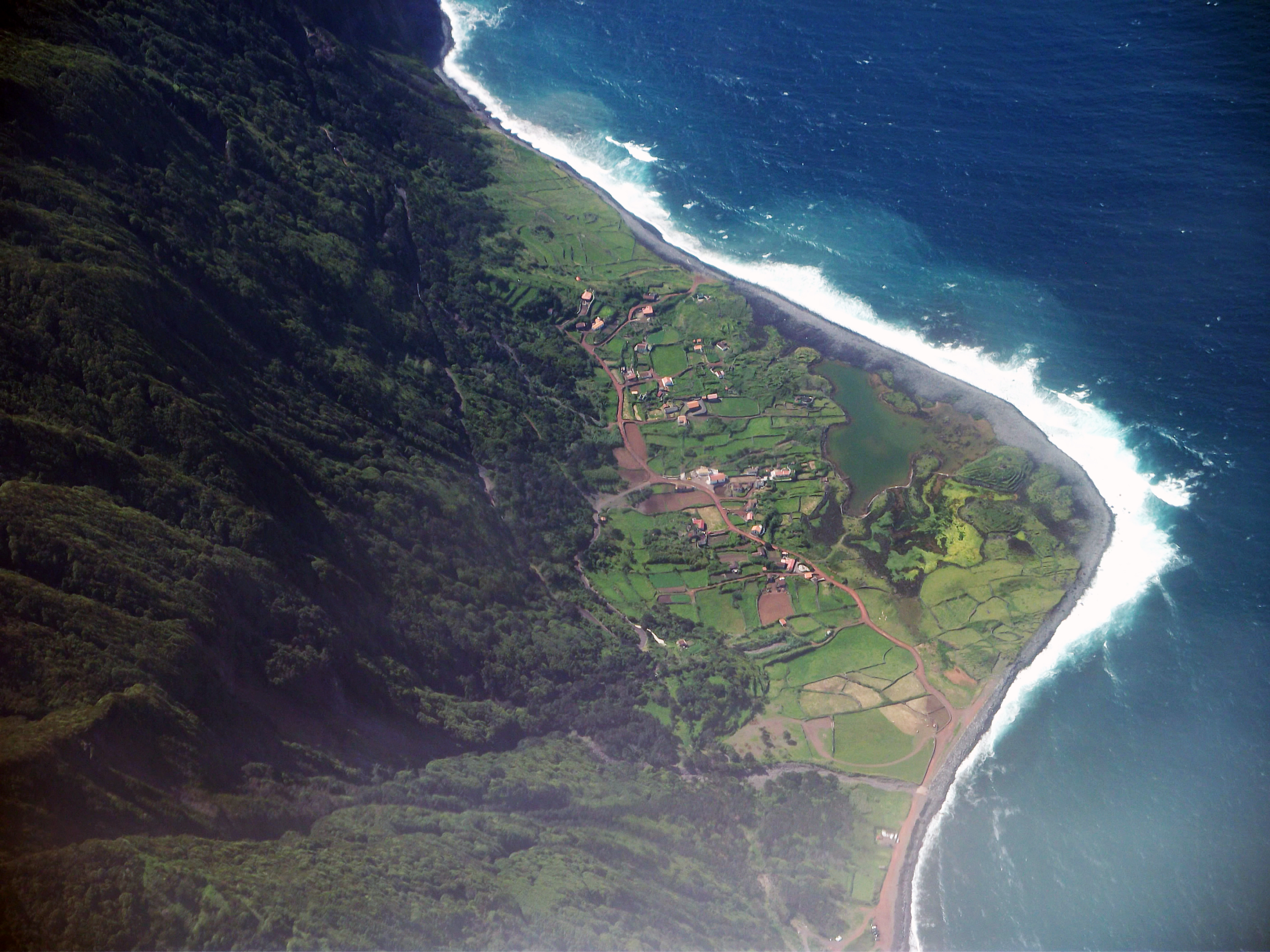
An aerial view of the fajã and cliffs that gave rise to its formation

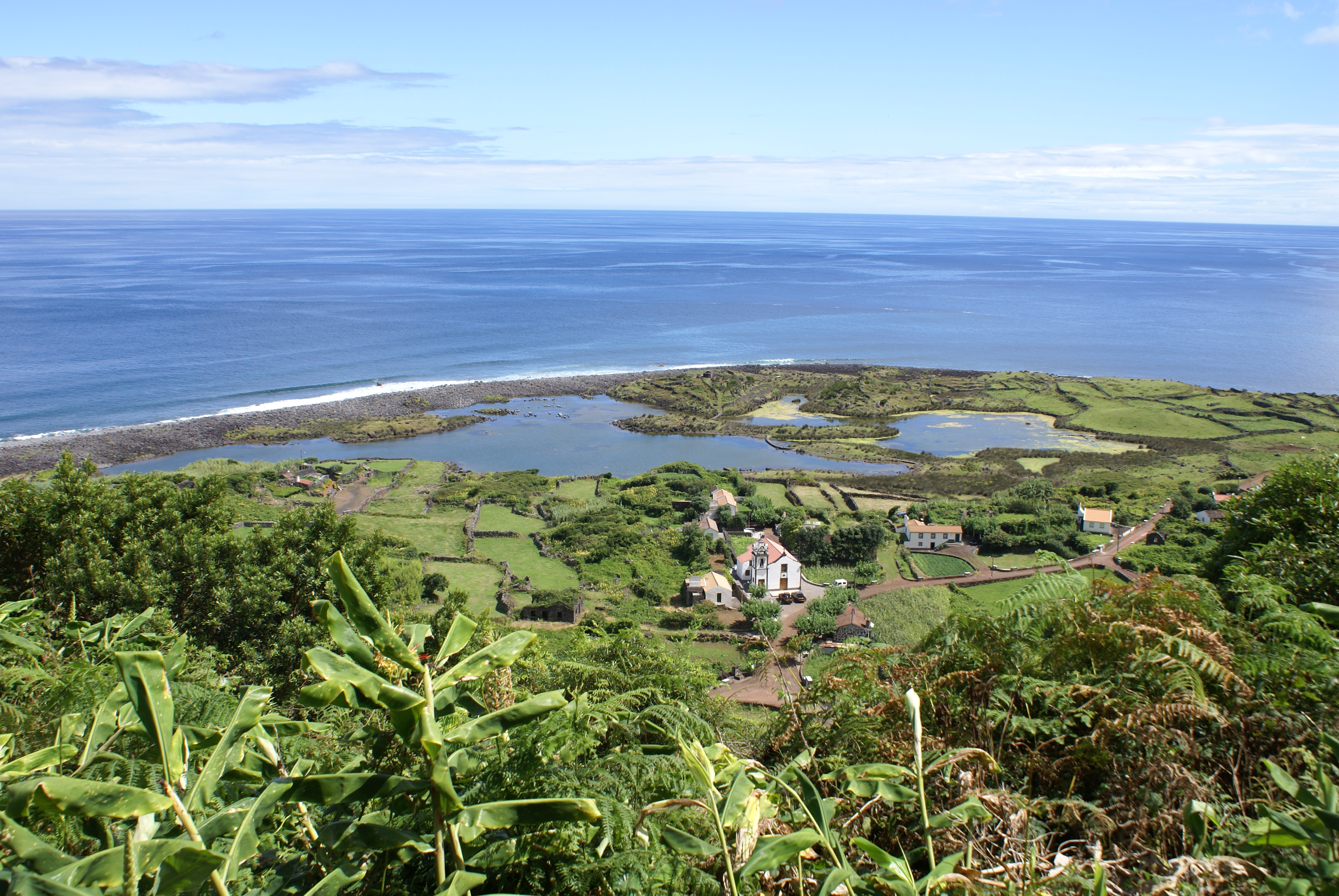
A view of the lagoon and the Hermitage of Nossa Senhora das Lurdes

The fajã is an irregular form, with four small islets, and is heavily influenced by tidal waters, due to the diffusion of salt water into the lagoon. In comparison with the lagoon of the Fajã da Caldeira de Santo Cristo, there is no canal to the sea, which affects the dynamic of this ecosystem. Morton (1998) identified two areas: one along the west, where the tidal waters rise between 20–30 metres (66–98 ft) (and which the salinity is elevated between 10-26%) and the eastern section, where salinity levels are between 0-6%. This milder salinity even allows the survival of a small population of frog (Rana esculenta).

Of the plants that exist at Fajã dos Cubres the predominant species include, the sharp-pointed rush (Juncus acutus), along the lagoon, Queen Anne's lace (Daucus carota) and the Azorean spurge (Euphorbia azorica). The presence of estuary grasses (Ruppia maritima) within the lagoon is of great importance, since they were exceptional within the Azores (and only at this site). The fajã has a variety of typical marine flora and fauna, and its lagoon has become a natural refuge for diverse marine and migratory birds. Nesting birds include the Cory's shearwater (Calonectris diomedea borealis), common snipe (Gallinago gallinago), yellow-legged gull (Larus cachinnans atlantis) and the common tern (Sterna hirundo). In addition, annually, farmers bring cattle down to the fajã to graze. Although prohibited now, at one time fishing occurred in the lagoon, mostly mullet and anchovies, using netting techniques.

The fajã, which is part of Ribeira Seca, is 3 kilometres (1.9 mi) west of the larger, Fajã da Caldeira de Santo Cristo. It is accessible by a winding road that descends the northern cliffs from the village of Norte Pequeno. Until 1993 this was a dirt roadway, and crossed many small bridges, where water drained from the plateau, but it was eventually asphalted by regional authorities.

The settlement constitutes a unique countryside, with a mix of buildings with modern and older amenities. A primary school has at some times operated, based on the number of available students, with most children bused to the larger secondary schools on the plateau.

== See also ==
- List of fajãs in the Azores
