= Coleophora triplicis =

Scientific classification
- Kingdom: Animalia
- Phylum: Arthropoda
- Class: Insecta
- Order: Lepidoptera
- Family: Coleophoridae
- Genus: Coleophora
- Species: C. triplicis

Binomial name
- Coleophora triplicis McDunnough, 1940

Species of moth

Coleophora triplicis is a moth of the family Coleophoridae. It is found in Canada, including New Brunswick and Nova Scotia. This species has also been recorded on Prince Edward Island in a salt marsh ecosystem. In Prince Edward Island, it was observed as a predator of the predispersed seeds of the Gulf of Saint Lawrence aster (Symphyotrichum laurentianum Fernald).

The larvae feed on the seeds of Solidago sempervirens.
