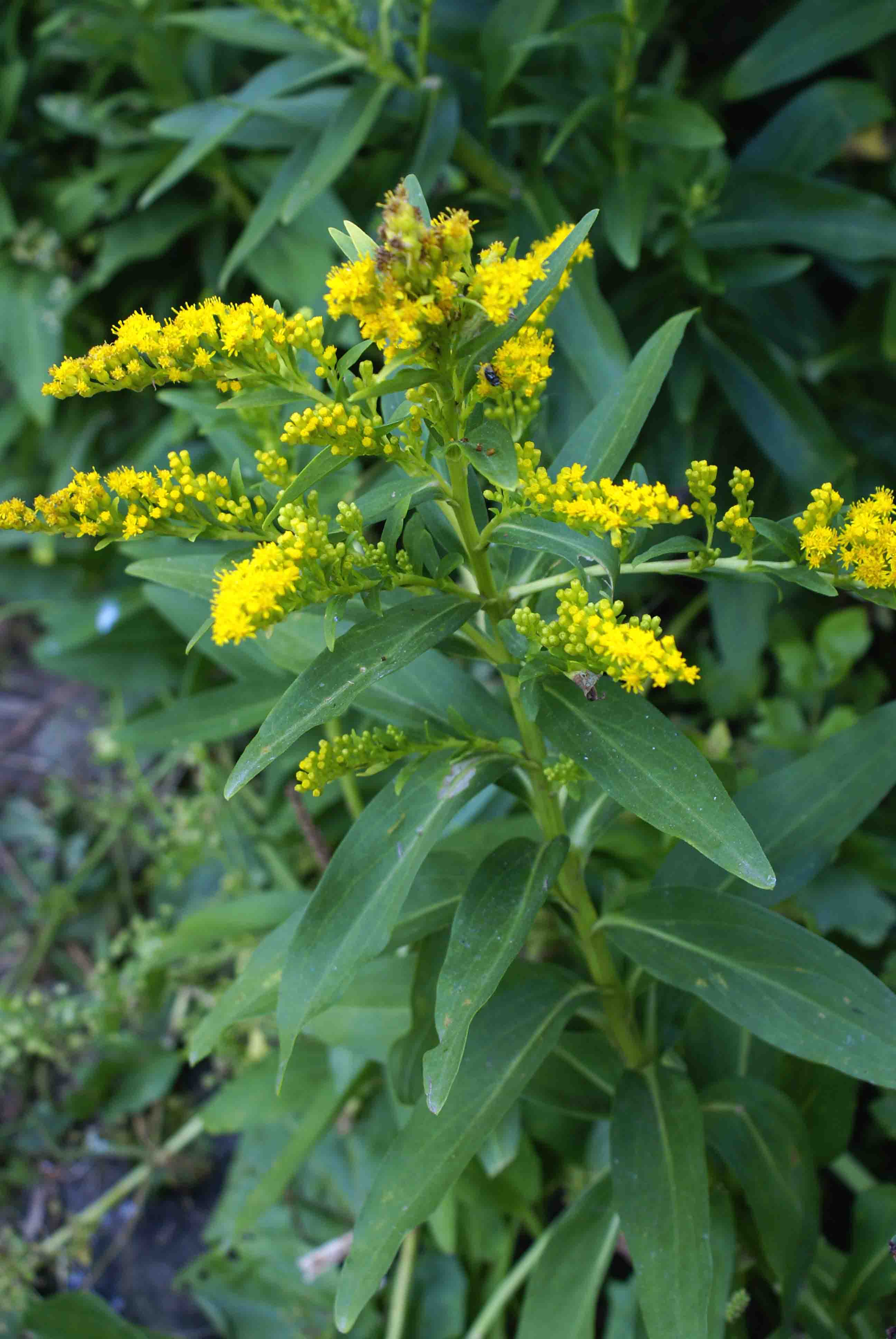
- Fajã dos Cubres on São Jorge Island

Scientific classification
- Kingdom: Plantae
- Clade: Tracheophytes
- Clade: Angiosperms
- Clade: Eudicots
- Clade: Asterids
- Order: Asterales
- Family: Asteraceae
- Genus: Solidago
- Species: S. azorica

Binomial name
- Solidago azorica Hochst

Synonyms
- Solidago sempervirens subsp. azorica (Hochst.) H. St. John

= Solidago azorica =

Species of flowering plant

Solidago azorica is a species of goldenrod in the family Asteraceae, endemic to the Azores, Portugal. It is closely related to Solidago sempervirens, native to eastern North America, but in addition to the morphological differences there is a clear genetic separation between the two species. This species is thought to have evolved from its American relative from a natural introduction made well before human occupation on the islands.

== Description ==
Stems are up to 60 cm (24 in) long; it has numerous leaves, which are apicular and slightly thick; it produces a large number of small yellow flowers.

== Distribution ==
It is found in coastal cliffs, lava flows and sand or stone deposits in rough terrain. It occurs dispersed in coastal meadows dominated by Festuca petraea, as well as in heavily exposed habitats, along paths and along stone walls. Up to about 500 m (1,600 ft) altitude (900 m (3,000 ft) in Flores). It is present in all of the nine Azorean islands.
