= Solar dos Noronhas =

Manor of the Noronhas
- Solar dos Noronhas
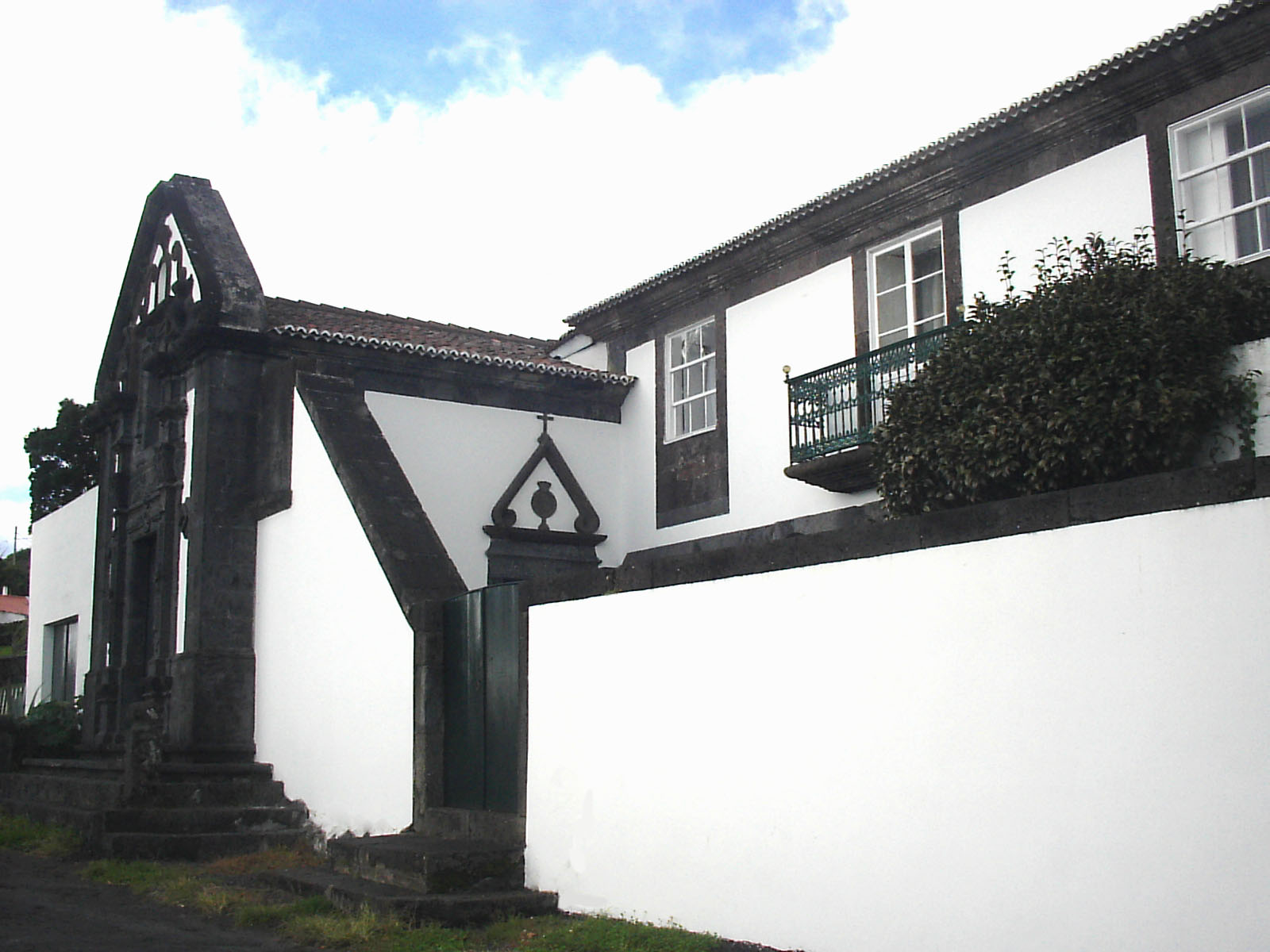
- Manorhouse of the Noronha family, a 16th-century estate house in the simple agrarian of São Jorge for the time

General information
- Type: Manorhouse
- Architectural style: Baroque
- Location: Ribeira Seca, Portugal
- Opened: 16th century
- Owner: Portuguese Republic

Technical details
- Material: Basalt

The Manor of the Noronhas (Portuguese: Solar dos Noronhas) is a Portuguese manorhouse located in the civil parish of Ribeira Seca, municipality of Calheta, on the island of São Jorge, in the archipelago of the Azores.

== History ==
Members of the Noronha family originally settled in Terceira, sometime in the 16th century, in the form of D. Luísa de Noronha. Daughter of Pedro Ponce Leão (a member of the Royal Household and aid to Queen Catherine) and D. Helena de Noronha, D. Luísa had her home in the town of Angra, in the heights of Rua do Gallo (today Rua de D. Amélia), today the location of the Palacete Silveira e Paulo.

The solar was named for the family that constructed it in the 18th century; it was constructed in 1781. This extensive manorhouse is unique for a rural landed-gentry of the period, and conveys the importance and wealth of this important family on the agrarian island of São Jorge at the time.

== Architecture ==
The important building includes a chapel annex, the Hermitage of Nossa Senhora dos Milagres, which was constructed during the same period, in the Baroque style.
