= Norte Grande (Azores) =

- Civil parish
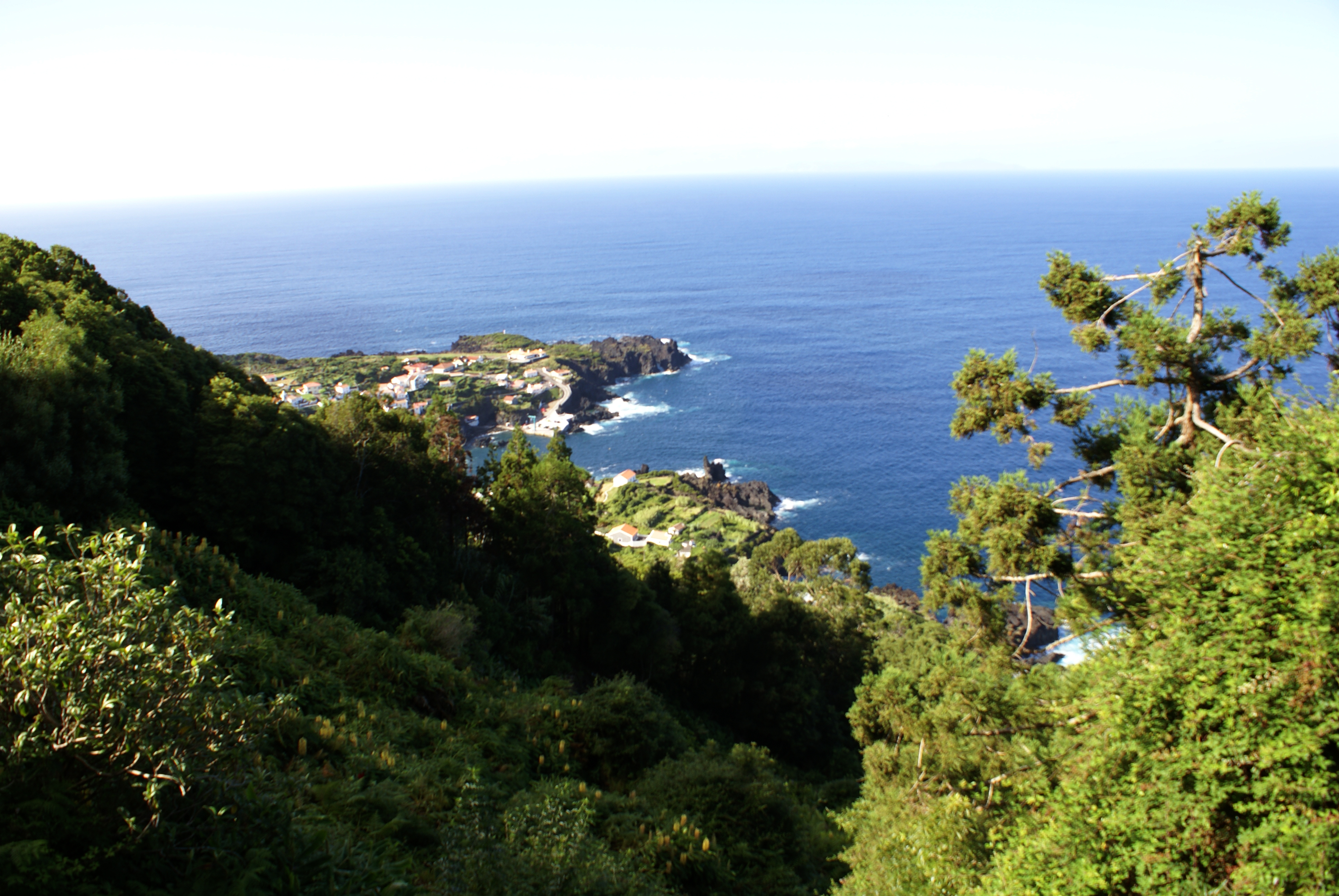
- Vista to Fajã do Ouvidor, along the northern coast of São Jorge in the civil parish of Norte Grande

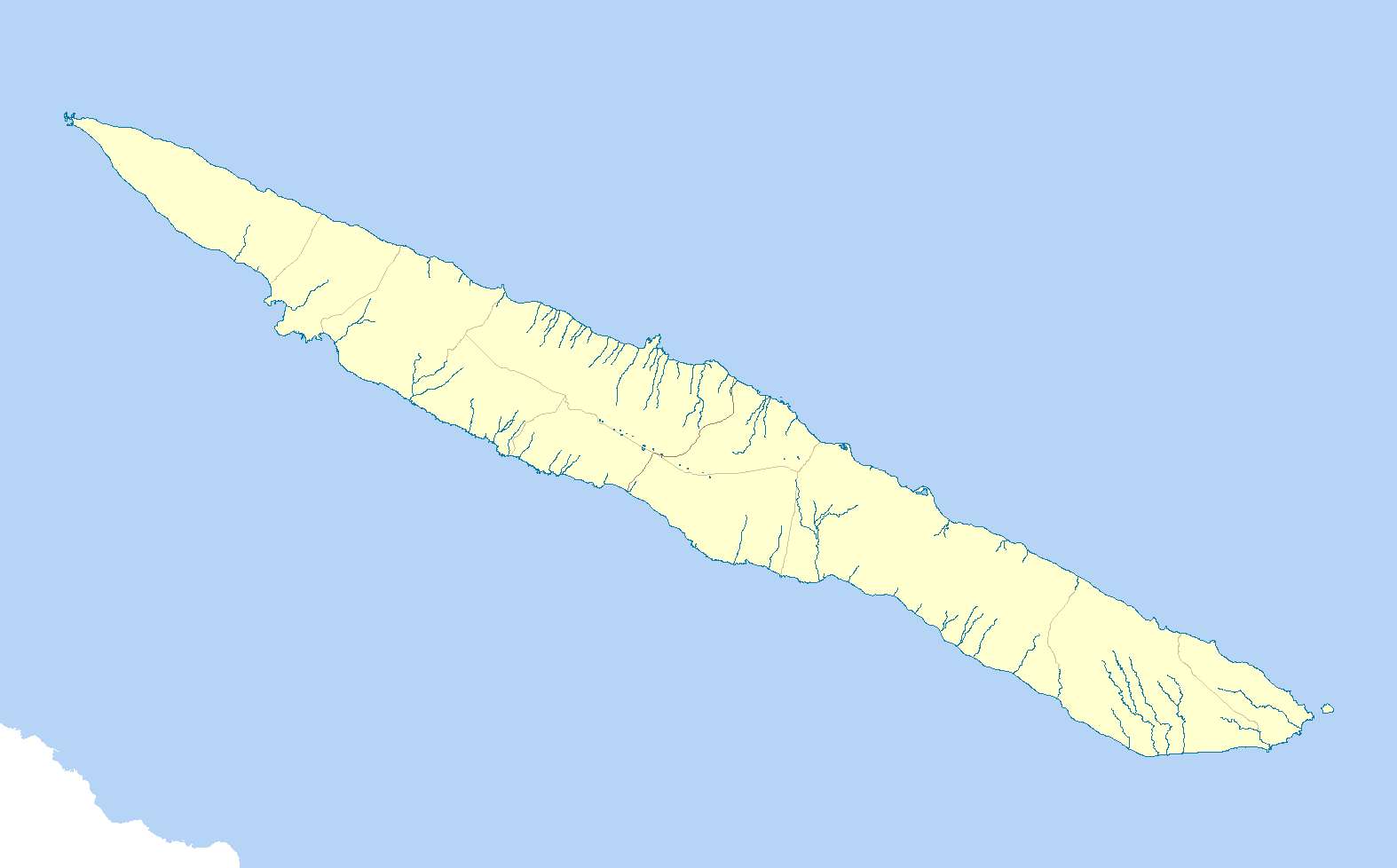
- Location in the Azores Norte Grande (São Jorge)
- Coordinates: 38°40′10″N 28°3′30″W
- Country: Portugal
- Auton. region: Azores
- Island: São Jorge
- Municipality: Velas
- Established: Settlement: c. 1570

Area
  - Total: 31.85 km^{2} (12.30 sq mi)
- Elevation: 343 m (1,125 ft)

Population (2011)
  - Total: 532
  - Density: 16.7/km^{2} (43.3/sq mi)
- Time zone: UTC−01:00 (AZOT)
  - Summer (DST): UTC+00:00 (AZOST)
- Postal code: 9800-132
- Area code: 292
- Patron: Nossa Senhora das Neves

Norte Grande is a civil parish in the municipality of Velas on the Portuguese island of São Jorge in the Azores; owing to the existence of an ecumenical faith community throughout its history, the parish has also taken on the name of its religious invocation (Nossa Senhora dos Neves, or Neves for short). The population in 2011 was 532, in an area of 31.85 km^{2}.

== History ==
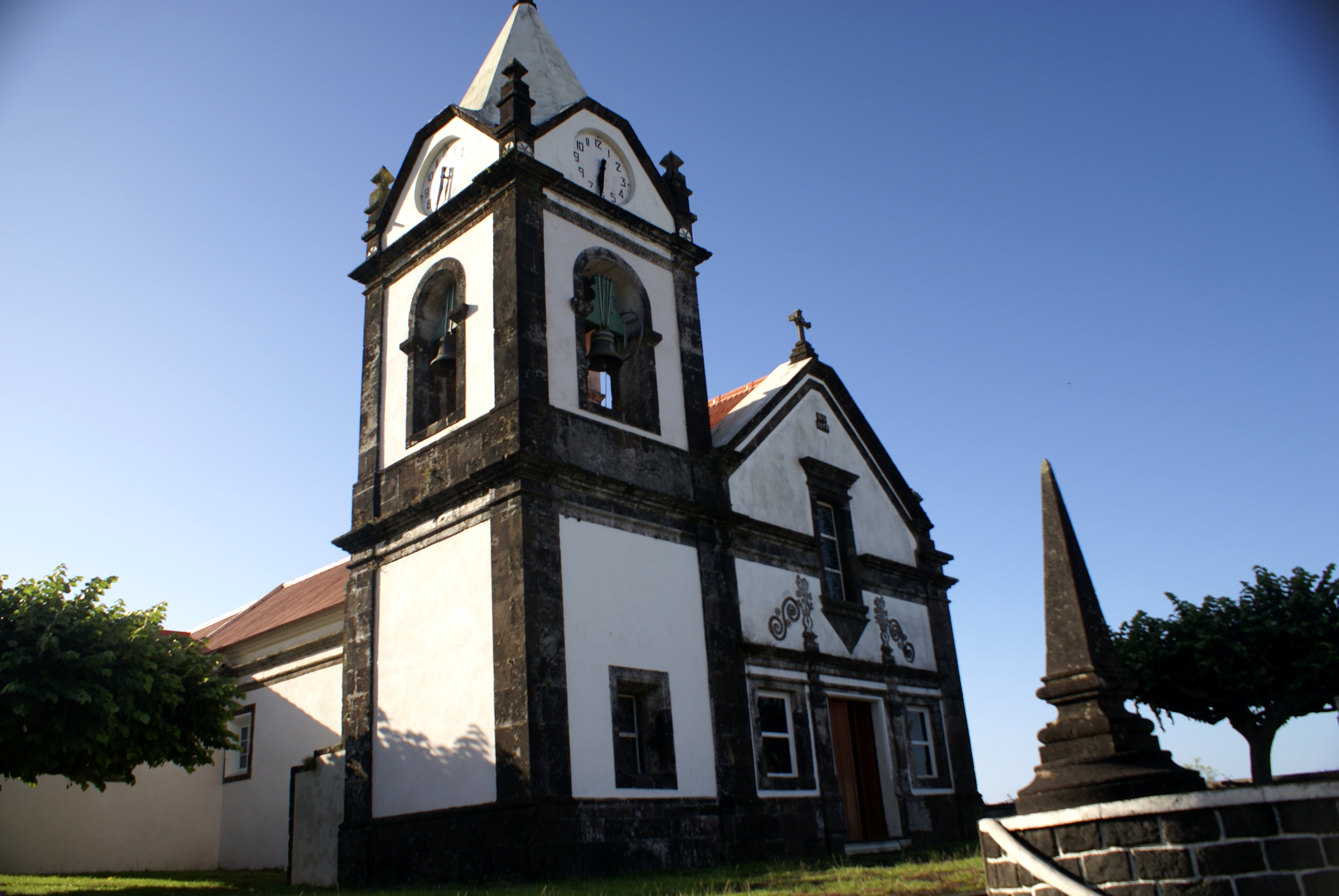
Church of Nossa Senhora das Neves, northern Velas, São Jorge.

The parish of Norte Grande it has been one of the largest populations on the island; by 1570, its importance along the north coast justified the construction of a road into the areas around Neves.

It was around the primitive parochial church of Norte Grande (the Church of Our Lady of the Snows), that the townsfolk encircled officials responsible for collecting the medieval tithes in 1694. This event was part of the Taro Revolt, when tax collectors were sent to the island to collect a tithe for taro cultivated. Indignant Calhetense gathered in Norte Grande, then encircled those officials in the church, who had taken refuge from the angry farmers, who refused to pay the excessive charge on a staple.

== Geography ==
Norte Grande straddles the interior crest and northern coast of São Jorge, approximately the middle of the island. Apart from an interior that is covered in spatter cones, the parish is dotted by sea level debris fields called "fajãs". During the settlement period these became sites of colonization, since the northern coast is wall of cliffs, historically accessible by foot or pack-animal. There are few settlements in the relatively sparse interior, apart from the two primary fajãs (Fajã da Aeira and Fajã do Ouvidor), only two many settlements are observable: Outeiro da Cruz and Neves. Between these settlements and the southern border are plains of agricultural and forested land, in addition to many inactive volcanic cones.

== Economy ==
The parish is home to a milk processing factory, used in the production of the island's epitimous Queijo de São Jorge, a protected denomination (DOP) of cheeses.

== Culture ==
Norte Grande is the seat of the Sociedade Filarmónica Recreio Nortense, founded in 1931, one of the premier philharmonic bands on the island.
