= Fajã do Ouvidor =

Area of São Jorge in the Azores, Portugal

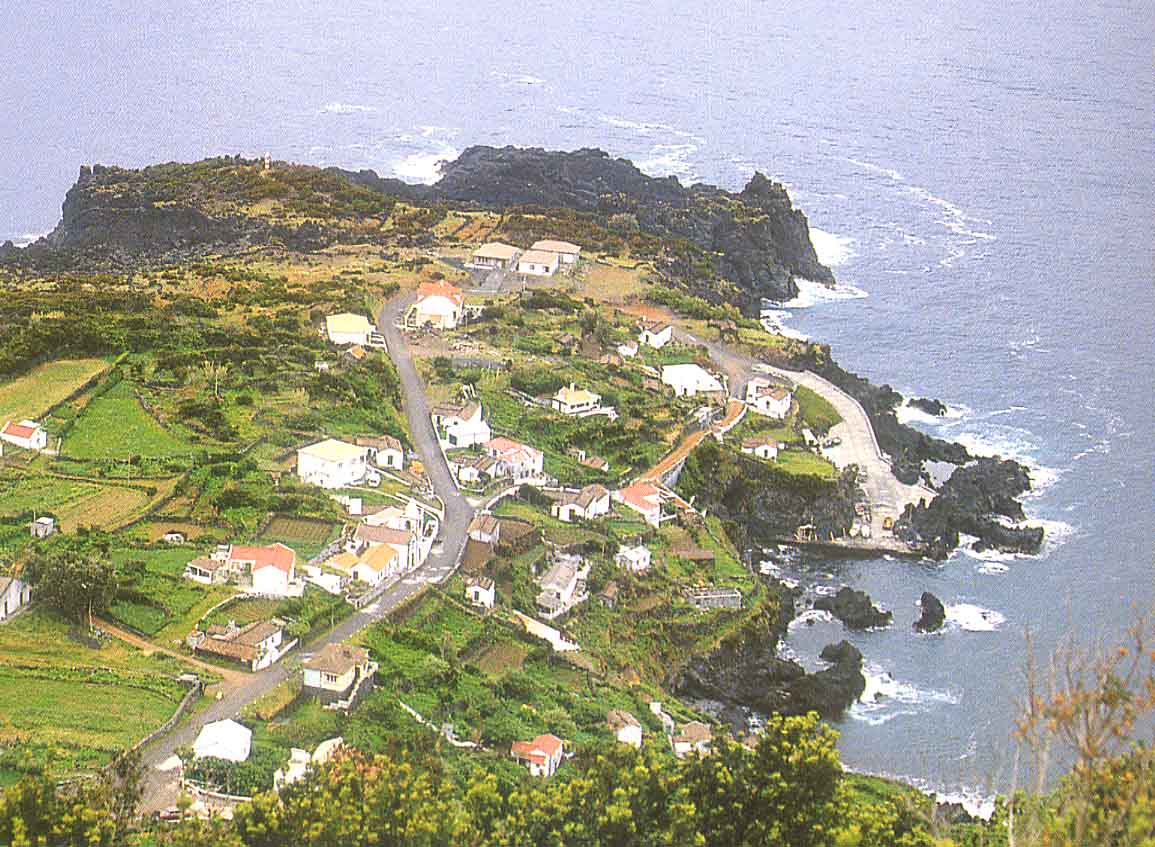
- A view of the most populous of the fajãs along the northern coast of São Jorge
- Interactive map of Fajã do Ouvidor
- Location: Norte Grande, São Jorge, Central, Azores, Portugal
- Coordinates: 38°40′37″N 28°3′11″W
- Visitors: Accessible by motor transport
- Geographic detail from Portuguese Army map

The Fajã do Ouvidor is a lava field from Pico da Esperança when it was active, and the most recent from the collapsing cliffs on the northern coast of the civil parish of Norte Grande, in the municipality of Velas, island of São Jorge, in the Portuguese archipelago of the Azores.

== History ==
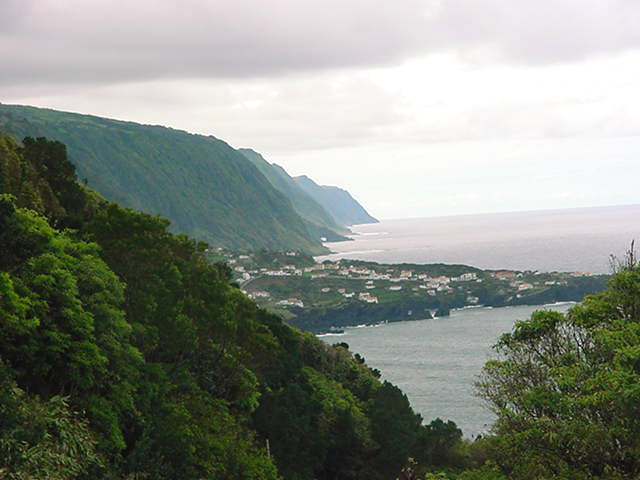
Fajã do Ouvidor à diastância, ilha de São Jorge, Açores, Portugal.

The fajã received its name due to its association with Valério Lopes de Azevedo, the magistrate/superintendent of the Donatary-Captain at the time, who was one of the principal property-owners.

During the 17th century, a whale-watching hut was established on the flanks of the fajã to spot whales transiting the northern coast. Fishermen from Ouvidor and surrounding settlements would then leave their homes to hunt whales: due to the decline of whaling the outpost was abandoned.

There is one religious meeting point in the fajã: the Hermitage of Nossa Senhora das Dores, which dates to 1903, and includes old images created in the parish of Norte Grande.

In 1948 a formal roadway was opened to the public, from the principal viewpoint to the coast.

== Geography ==
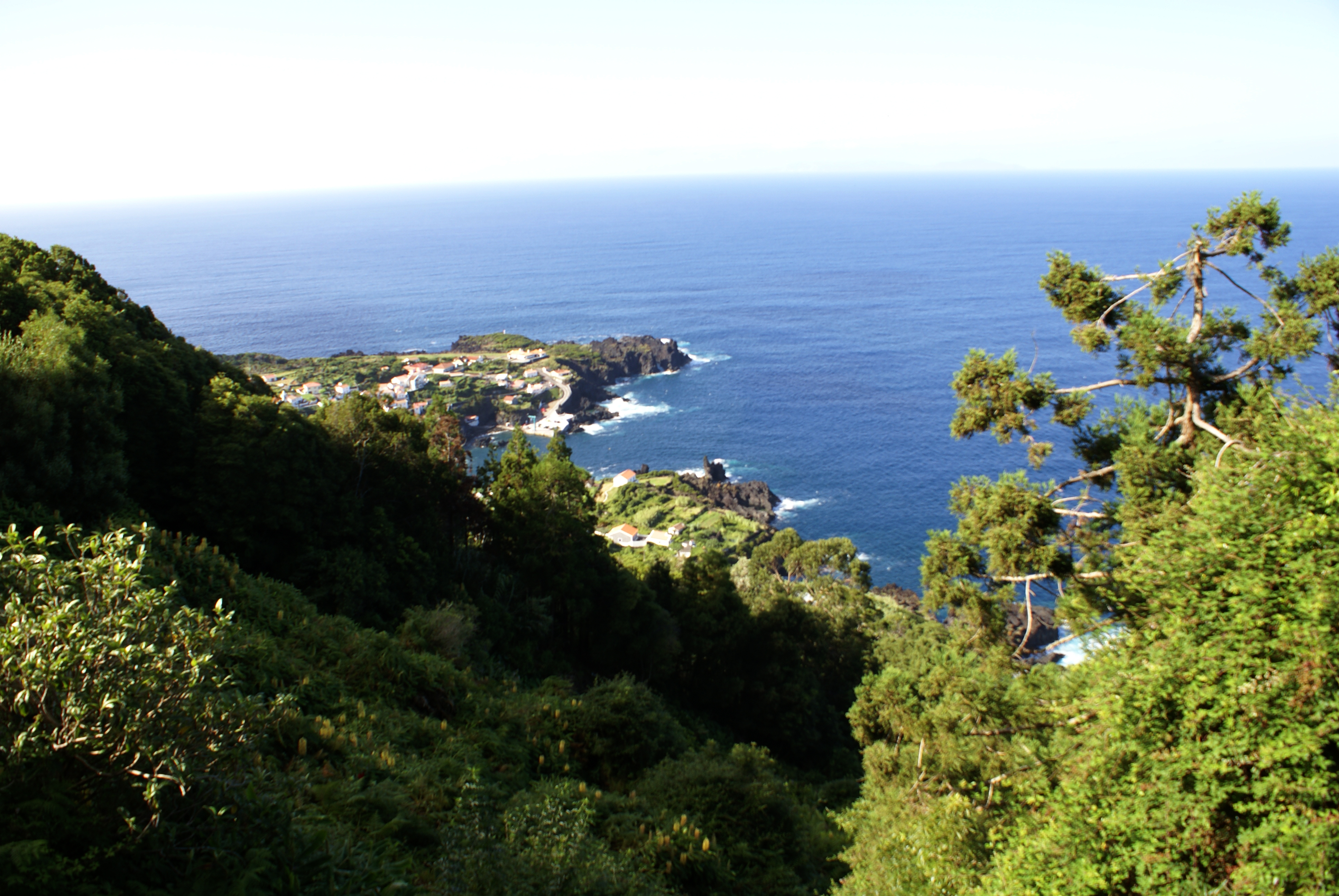
Fajã do Ouvidor, vista geral.

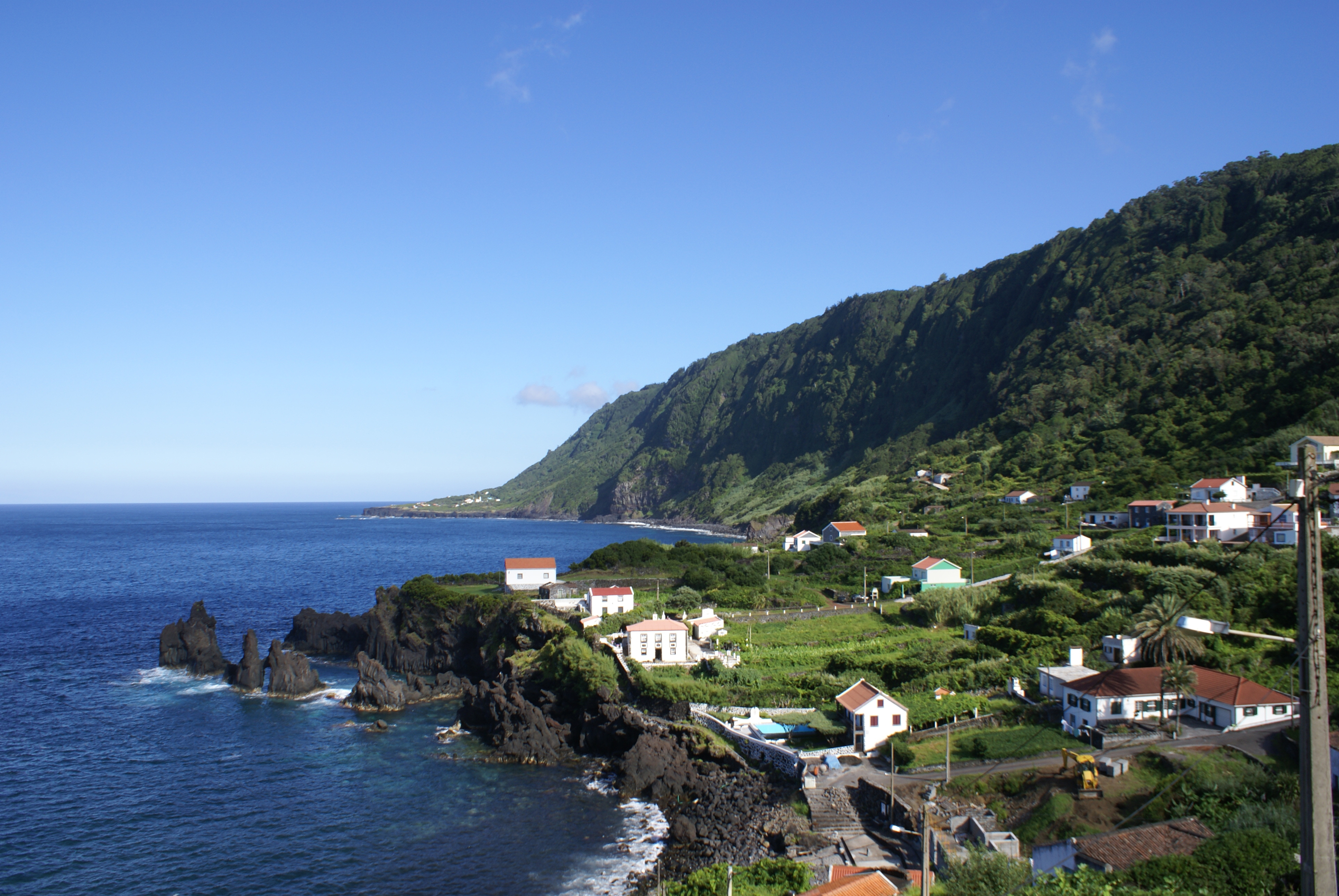
Fajã do Ouvidor, povoado.

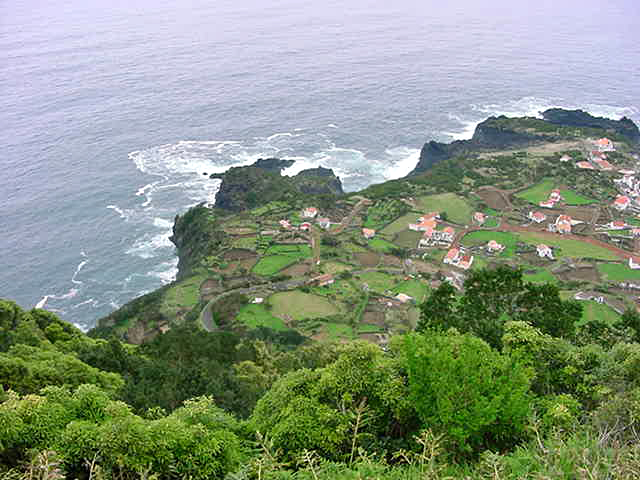
Vista Parcia da Fajã do Ouvidor, ilha de São Jorge, Açores, Portugal.

=== Physical geography ===
The fajã is known for the geological feature along the coast, including the many poças, or tidal pools (such as the Poça João Dias and Poço do Carneiro). The lava fields generated many natural pools supporting natural swimming areas, the largest being the Poça de Simão Dias. Similarly, the fajã's coast is dotted by grottoes and coves, formed by marine erosion, including the Furna do Lobo, a cove approximately 50 metres (160 ft) long and only accessible by boat.

Among the waterways that descend from the flanks of Norte Pequeno are the Ribeira da Casa Velha (supporting eels). the Grotinha do Furão and the Ribeira do Ilhéu, supported by two important springs: the Abelheira, situated alongside the roadway to Ouvidor, and the Caminho Velho on the other side of the main square.

=== Biome ===
The more abundant species of fish in the waters include: Mediterranean parrotfish (Sparisoma cretense), moray eel, anchovy, grouper, wrasse, in addition to crabs and limpets. Marine and terrestrial birds vary throughout the year, influenced by migratory patterns and climate. In addition to local terns, shearwaters and herons, the fajã is visited by wagtails, sparrows and common blackbird (Turdus merula) throughout the year, with other species arriving in the summer months.

=== Human geography ===
The fajã is occupied by a couple of dozen homes, some dating back centuries. But, less than half of those homes are constantly inhabited throughout the year. The majority of the remaining homes and new dwellings are inhabited during the summer months when the local population "booms" with summer tourists and visitors: there are approximately 30 families that have homes in this community. It is one of the few fajãs that have a sufficient population to support a disco, café, restaurant, and lighthouse and is one of the most visited fajãs on the island, due to its ease and access from the interior.

During the winter months, some farmers graze their few cattle on private land, but generally, arable land is occupied by potatoes, beans, corn, garlic, onions, and small vineyards. The fishing port which includes a crane, supports various maritime activities including boating and recreational and artisanal fishing, using hooks or nets.

== Culture ==
The festival honour Our Lady of Sorrows (Portuguese: Festa da Nossa Senhora das Dores) occurs annually on the third Sunday in September, with mass, sermon and a procession paying vows of its parishioners.

== See also ==
- List of fajãs in the Azores
