= Fajã =

Broken rock fragments at the feet of coastal cliffs

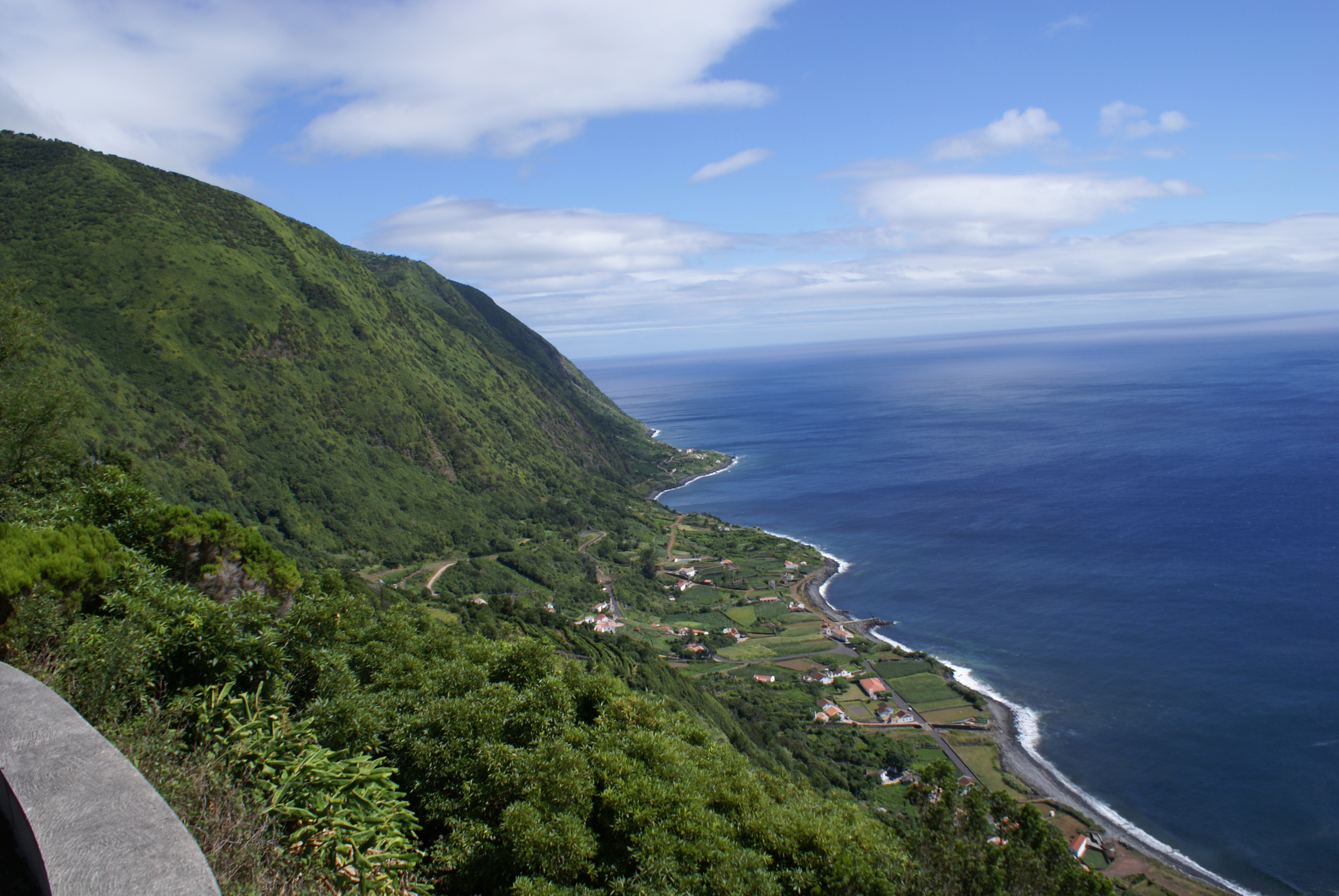
A view of some of the Fajã dos Vimes in the municipality of Calheta

Fajã (Portuguese pronunciation: [fɐˈʒɐ̃], of unknown etymology) is a Portuguese term of obscure origin used to describe supratidal talus at the foot of coastal cliffs, caused by landslides or lava flows. Although relatively common world-wide, they are distinctive features of the Azores and Madeira, as well as of the Canary Islands, where the equivalent term in Canarian Spanish is fajana (Spanish pronunciation: [faˈxana]). The term also designates a small flat piece of land, generally cultivable and located by the sea, formed of materials fallen from cliffs. Another Canarian word for lava fajanas is isla baja, literally, "low island".

== Geology ==
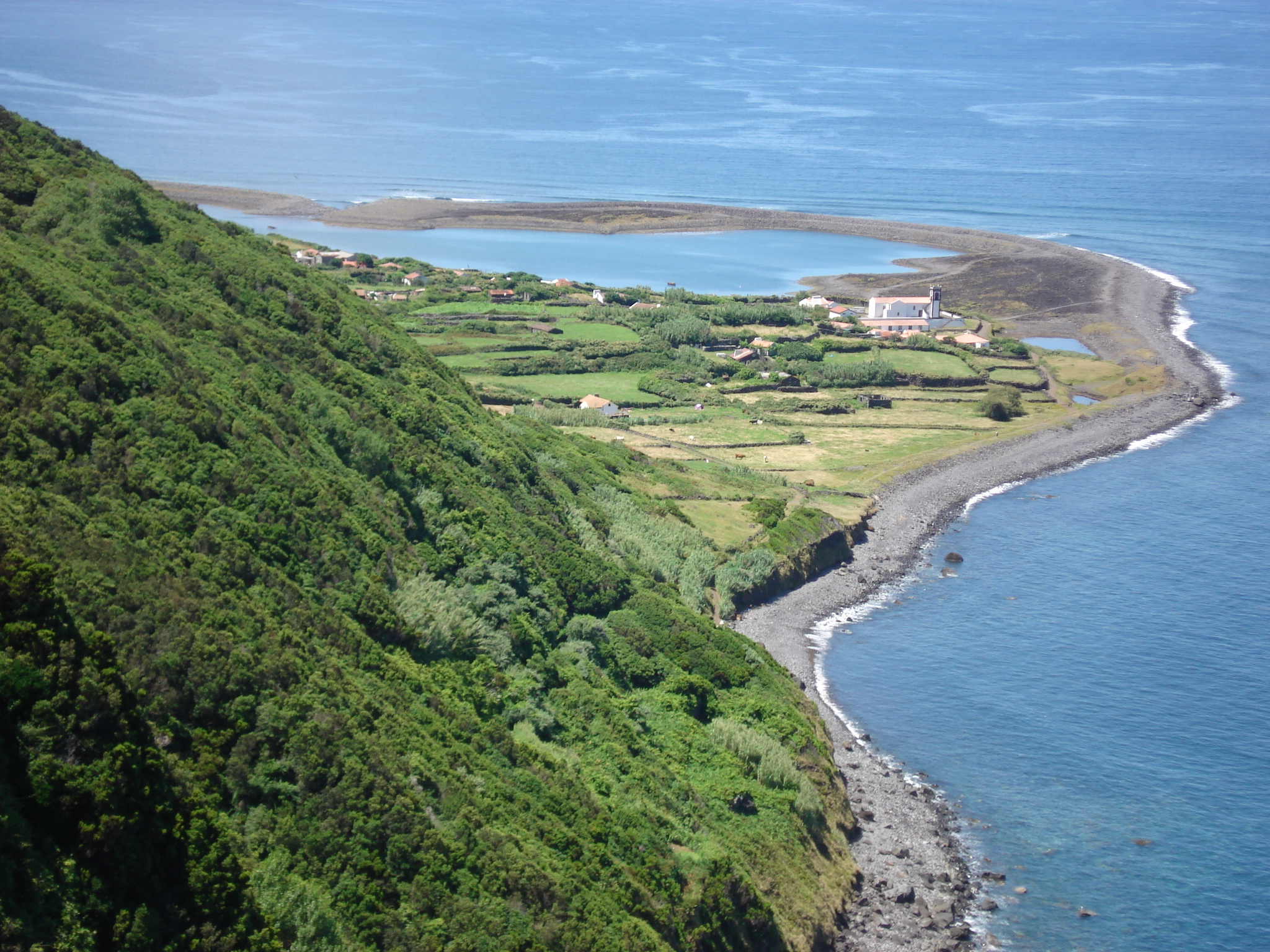
The detritic platform of Fajã da Caldeira de Santo Cristo, with its emblematic lagoon

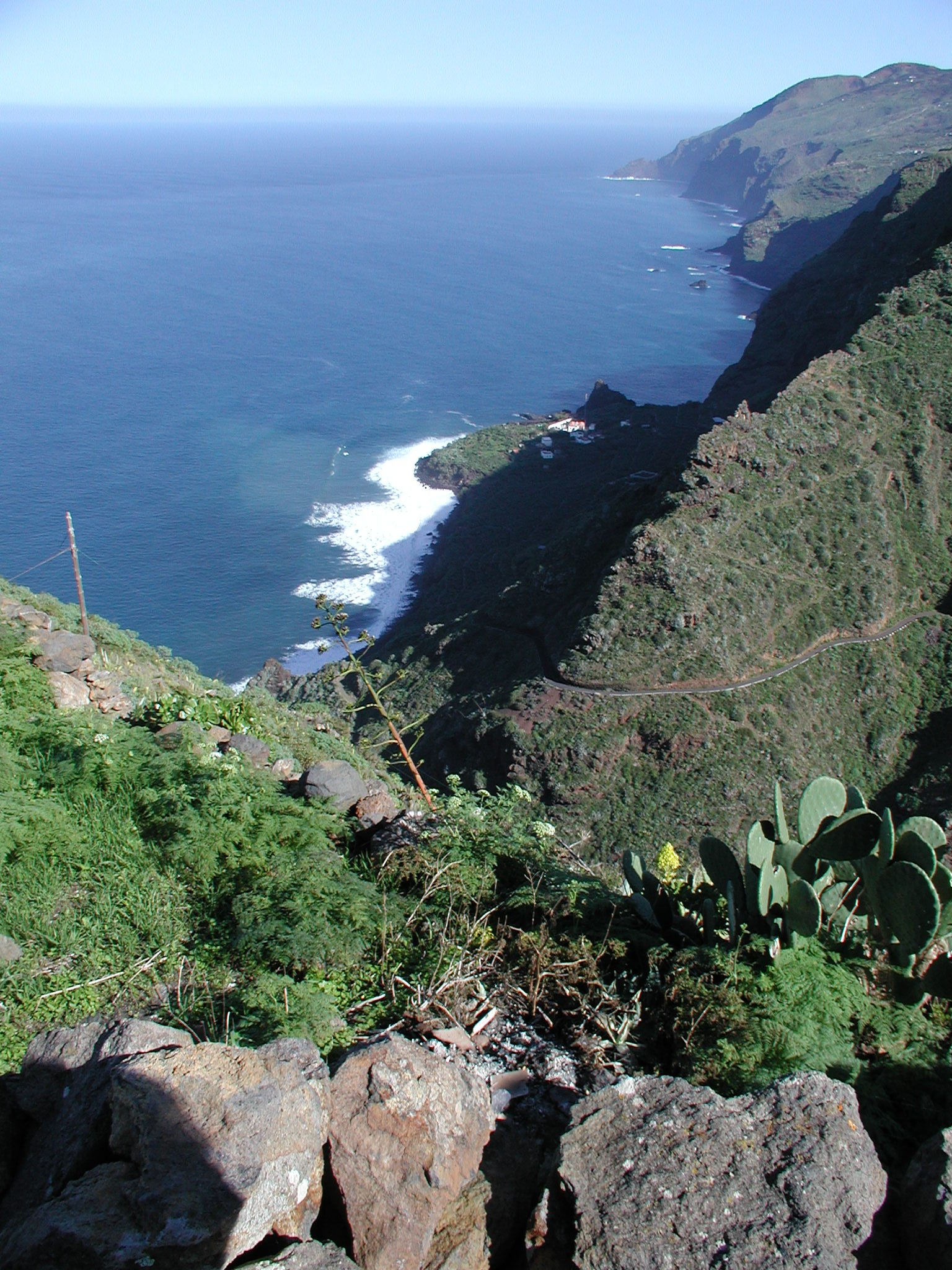
View of Fajana de Franceses, in the island of La Palma, Spain.

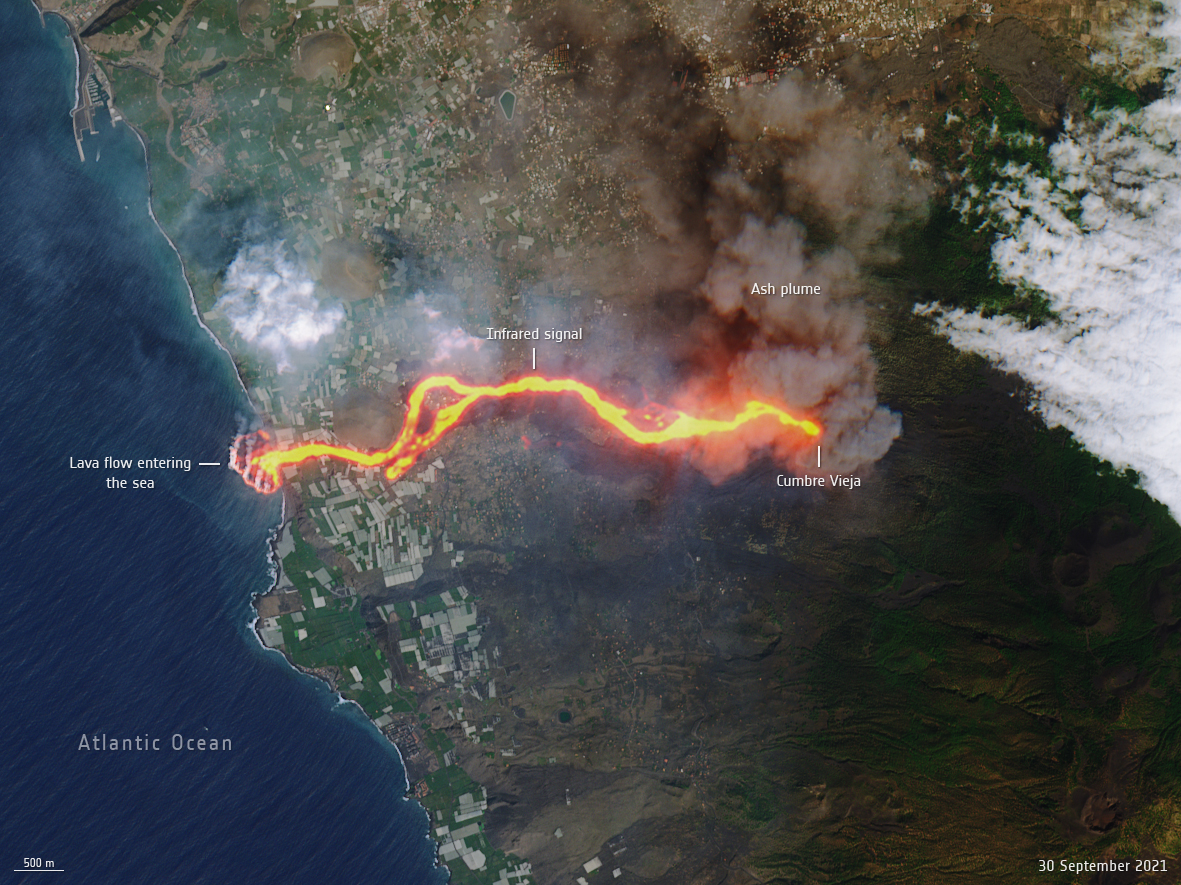
In this satellite view of the 2021 Cumbre Vieja eruption in La Palma, the lava flow falls from the cliffs on the west into the Atlantic and forms a lava delta as a fajana.

Fajãs are created from collapsing cliffs or lava flows and are identifiable along the coast as "flat" surfaces, relative to other geological forms. Tides and tidal currents have only minor influence on coastal morphology, and therefore sedimentation and deposits there became permanent.

Composed of fertile soils, these microclimates allow the cultivation of a variety of staple and exotic plants, such as coffee.

=== Azores ===
These debris fields exist throughout the archipelago of the Azores but are concentrated on the island of São Jorge. The island is volcanic, with cliffs that run down to the coast, and fajãs that extend into the sea as a result of these cliffs collapsing. The long fetch of the Azores is a high-energy wave climate, and the steep submarine slopes and absence of shallow shelves produce patterns of wave shoaling, refraction, and diffraction, especially during storms. This leads to fragmentation of the coast into several dynamic cells whose sediment alongshore is limited by impermeable boundaries.

There are fajãs on both sides of the island: along the southern coast are the notable fajãs of Velas, Vimes, Bodes, Além, São João, Cardoso, and Alabaçal, while in the north a succession of much smaller fajãs result from the collapse of land cut by small ravines.

- The fajãs of Caldeira do Santo Cristo have an underwater cave and an open lagoon
- The Fajã dos Cubres, with a closed lagoon ecosystem and a crystalline lake
- The Fajã do Ouvidor is a dendritic fajã extending into the sea, used by fishermen.

Although many of these fajãs have been abandoned, mills and fountains remain iconic outposts along hiking trails.

The fajãs are fertile and, historically used to cultivate yams, maize, and vegetables, although coffee, vineyards, and tropical fruits were also grown there. Several fajãs are scattered along the northern and southern coasts, including the fajãs of Santo Cristo and Cubres, with their distinctive saltwater lagoons. One of the more unique harvests occurs at Fajã of Caldeira do Santo Cristo, where the lagoon supports cockles: this makes Santo Cristo a popular destination for the unique gastronomy of the Azores.
