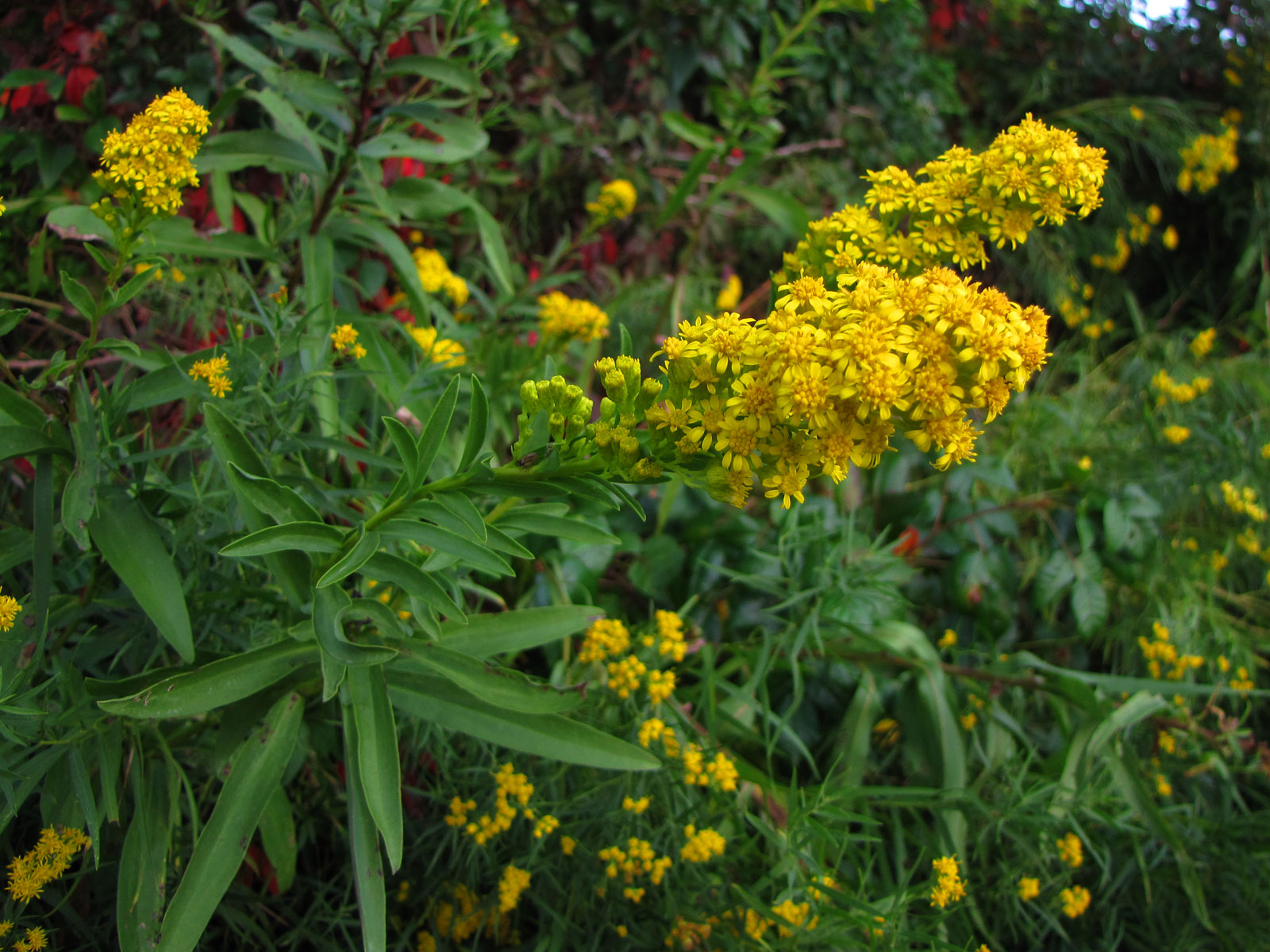
- Woods Hole, Massachusetts

Scientific classification
- Kingdom: Plantae
- Clade: Tracheophytes
- Clade: Angiosperms
- Clade: Eudicots
- Clade: Asterids
- Order: Asterales
- Family: Asteraceae
- Genus: Solidago
- Species: S. sempervirens

Binomial name
- Solidago sempervirens L.
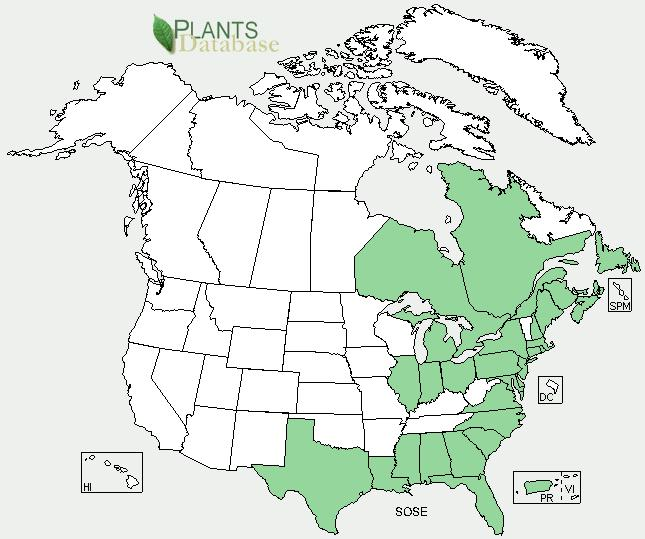
- Distribution in United States + Canada

Synonyms
- Aster sempervirens (L.) Kuntze; Dasiorima limonifolia Raf.; Dasiorima mexicana Raf.; Solidago azorica Hochst. ex Seub.

= Solidago sempervirens =

Species of aquatic plant

Solidago sempervirens, the seaside goldenrod or salt-marsh goldenrod, is a plant species in the genus Solidago of the family Asteraceae. It is native to eastern North America and parts of the Caribbean. It is an introduced species in the Great Lakes region. Similar plants found in the Azores (now Solidago azorica) are thought have evolved from a natural introduction of this species.

== Description ==
Solidago sempervirens is a succulent, herbaceous perennial that reaches heights of 4–6 feet (120–180 cm). It is unusual in the genus in having toothless, hair-less leaves, thicker than those of most other Solidago species. Flower heads are found in a large paniculiform inflorescence at the top of the plant, often with branches that bend backwards towards the base. This species blooms in late summer and well into the fall, later in the season than most of its relatives. Its fruits are wind-dispersed achenes. They are yellow often, and have sprouts of buds at the end of the short branches.

== Distribution and habitat ==
In nature, S. sempervirens is primarily a plant of the seashore, and is accordingly found along coasts of the Atlantic Ocean, the Caribbean, and the Gulf of Mexico from Central America north as far as Newfoundland. It grows on sand dunes, salt marshes, and the banks of estuaries. It is naturally found inland along the St. Lawrence Seaway and the Great Lakes, and has expanded its range further inland along roadsides over the past 30 years. It is highly tolerant of both saline soils and salt spray, and is usually found growing on coastal dunes and in salt marshes.

Varieties

- Solidago sempervirens var. mexicana (L.) Fernald - from Massachusetts south to Central America and the West Indies
- Solidago sempervirens var. sempervirens - from Newfoundland south to Virginia; introduced in Great Lakes region

== Ecology ==
Solidago sempervirens is a seashore plant with a high salinity tolerance. It is occasionally cultivated as an ornamental, preferring sunny locations with sandy soil, with little competition from other species.

=== Galls ===
This species is host to the following insect induced galls:

- Eurosta cribrata (Wulp, 1867)
- Gnorimoschema salinaris Busck, 1911
- Calycomyza solidaginis Kaltenbach, 1869

external link to gallformers
