= Ribeira Seca (Calheta) =

- Civil parish
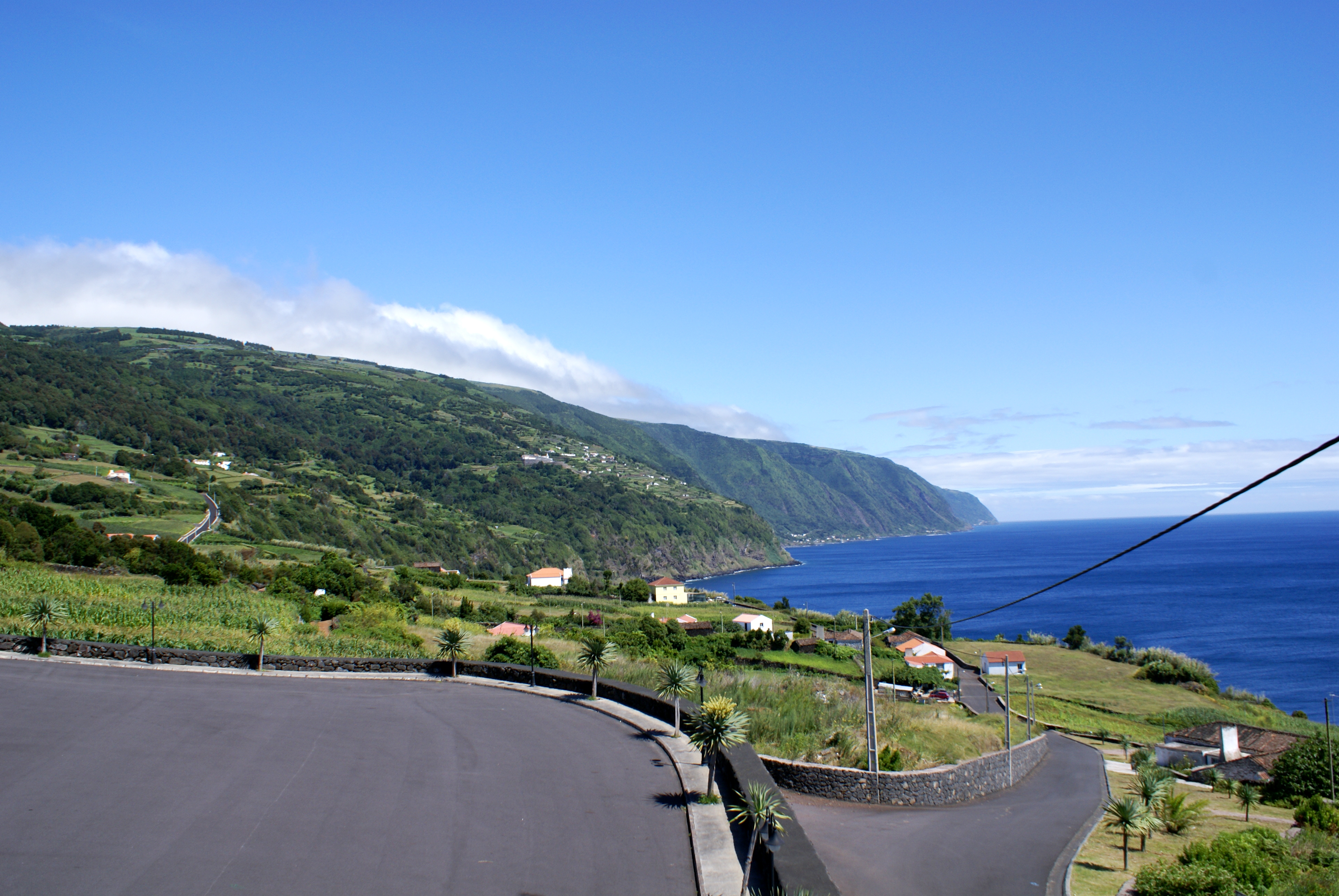
- View of the coastal zone of Ribeira Seca, with the village of Lourais in the distance.

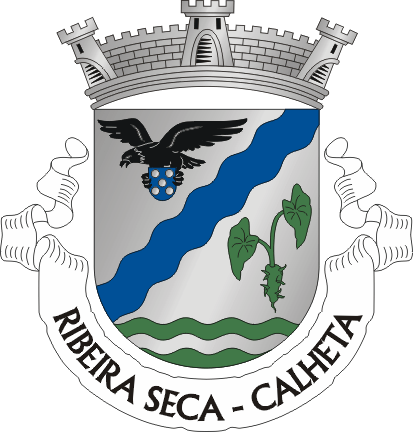
- Coat of arms

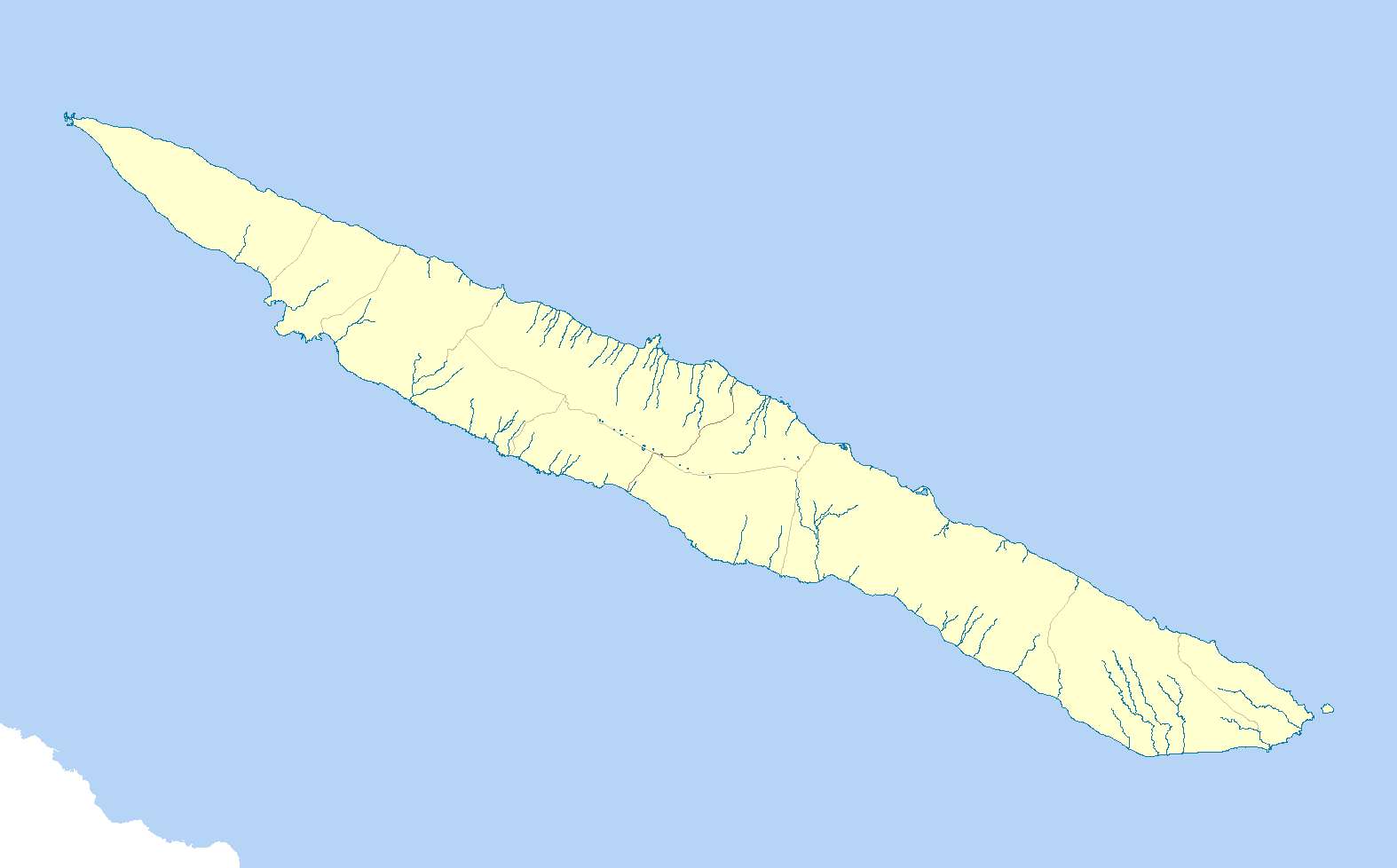
- Location in the Azores Ribeira Seca (São Jorge)
- Coordinates: 38°35′53″N 27°58′48″W
- Country: Portugal
- Auton. region: Azores
- Island: São Jorge
- Municipality: Calheta

Area
  - Total: 53.77 km^{2} (20.76 sq mi)
- Elevation: 96 m (315 ft)

Population (2011)
  - Total: 1,025
  - Density: 19.06/km^{2} (49.37/sq mi)
- Time zone: UTC−01:00 (AZOT)
  - Summer (DST): UTC+00:00 (AZOST)
- Postal code: 9850-219
- Area code: 292
- Patron: São Tiago Maior

Ribeira Seca is a freguesia ("civil parish") in the municipality of Calheta in the Portuguese Azores. The population in 2011 was 1,025, in an area of 53.77 km^{2}. It contains the localities Aveiro, Caldeira de Cima, Caminhos Novos, Canada de Baixo, Faja da Entre Ribeiras, Fajã da Figueira, Fajã da Fonte Nicolau, Fajã das Cubres, Fajã de Além, Fajã do Belo, Fajã do Sanguinhal, Fajã do Santo Cristo, Fajã dos Bodes, Fajã dos Vimes, Fajã Redonda, Grotão Fundo, Loiral de Baixo, Loiral de Cima, Lomba, Pojal, Portal, Ribeira Seca, São Bartolomeu and Silveira.

== Architecture ==
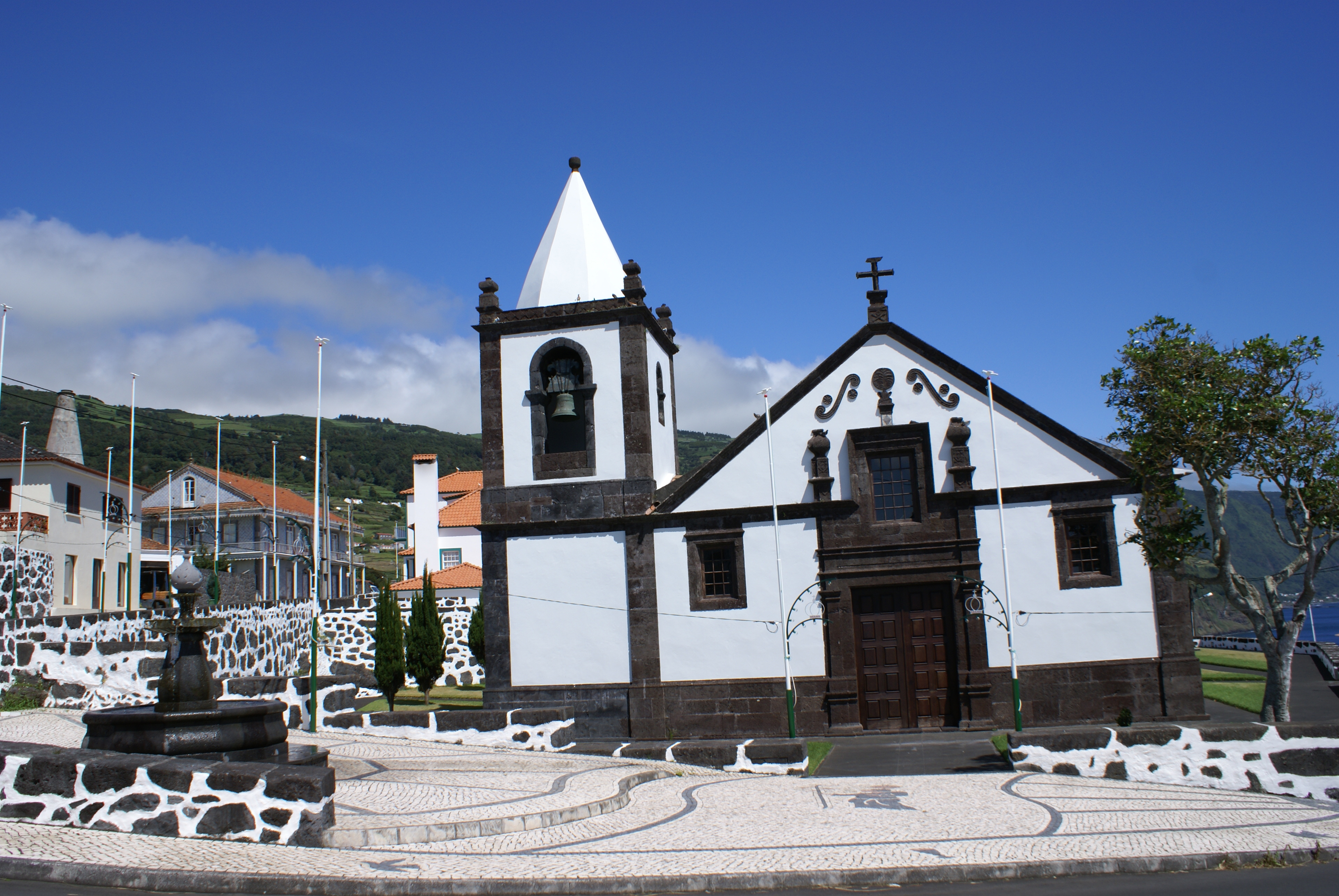
Parochial church of São Tiago Maior, named for the Apostle James.

=== Civic ===
- Manorhouse of the Noronhas (Portuguese: Solar dos Noronhas), a 16th-century Baroque manorhouse, constructed by the prestigious Noronha family;

=== Religious ===
- Sanctuary of Santo Cristo da Caldeira (Portuguese: Capela do Santo Cristo da Caldeira/Santuário do Santo Cristo da Caldeira)
- Church of São Tiago (Portuguese: Igreja Paroquial de Ribeira Seca/Igreja de São Tiago)
