= Fajã do Boi =

- Fajã
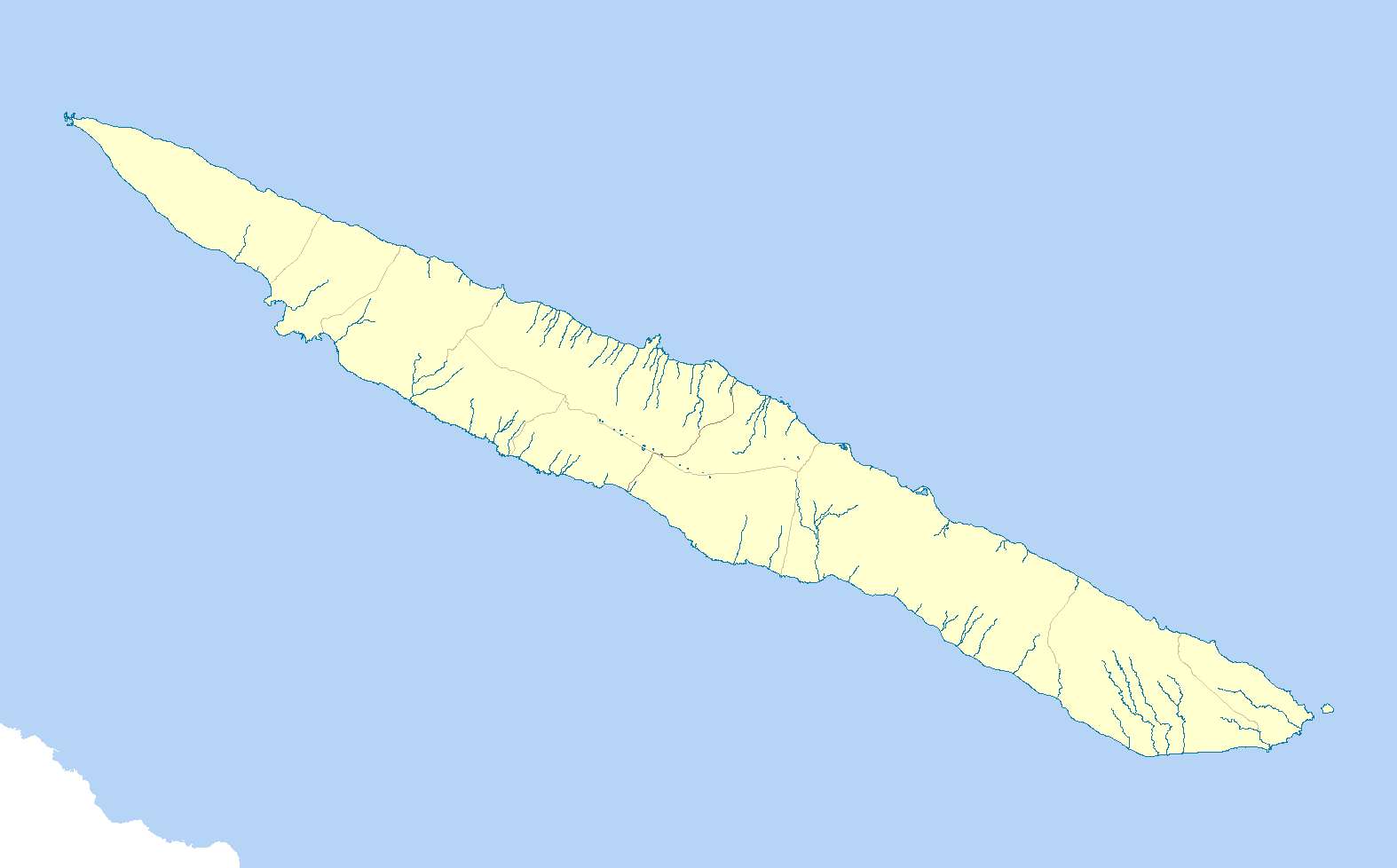
- Location within São Jorge
- Coordinates: 38°44′1″N 28°14′18″W
- Location: Rosais, São Jorge Island
- Access: Accessible by foot, yet restricted during periods of unfavourable weather

The Fajã do Boi is a permanent debris field, built from the collapsing cliffs on the northern coast of the civil parish of Rosais, in the municipality of Velas, island of São Jorge, in the Portuguese archipelago of the Azores.

Located between the Fajã de João Dias and Fajã da Maria Pereira, there is no permanent human settlement on the fajã.

== See also ==
- List of fajãs in the Azores
