= Fajã da Ermida =

- Fajã
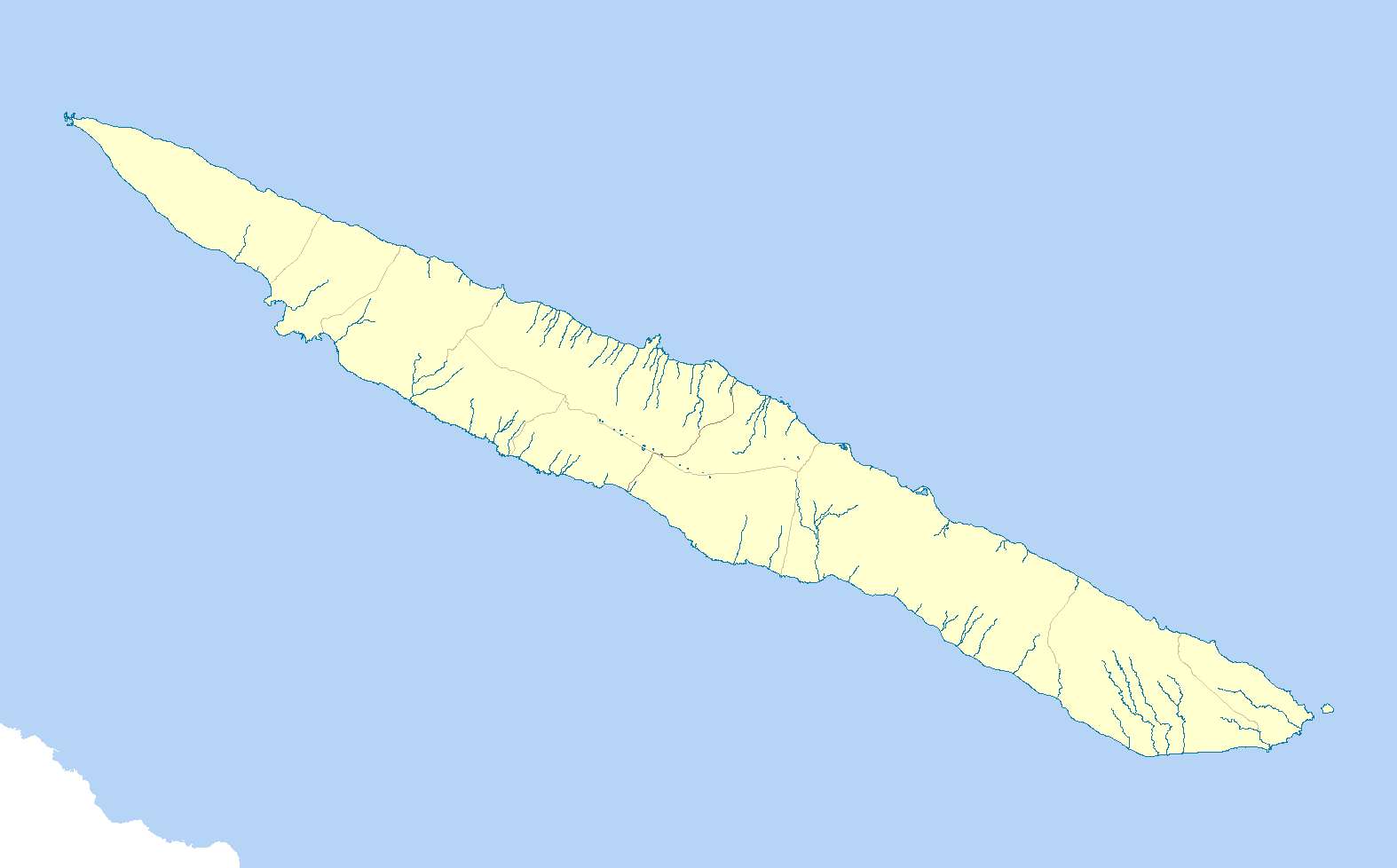
- Location within São Jorge
- Coordinates: 38°44′15″N 28°14′52″W
- Location: Rosais, São Jorge Island
- Access: Accessible by foot, yet restricted during periods of unfavourable weather

The Fajã da Ermida (Fajã of the Hermitage) is a permanent debris field, known as a fajã, built from the collapsing cliffs on the northern coast of the civil parish of Rosais, in the municipality of Velas, island of São Jorge, in the Portuguese archipelago of the Azores.

Fajã da Ermida is accessible by trail from the neighbouring Fajã da Maria Pereira and Fajã Amaro da Cunha, along the northern coast of the island.

While at one time the area was inhabited constantly, today the region is mostly used for some grazing and subsistence farming.

== See also ==
- List of fajãs in the Azores
