= Fajã de Fernando Afonso =

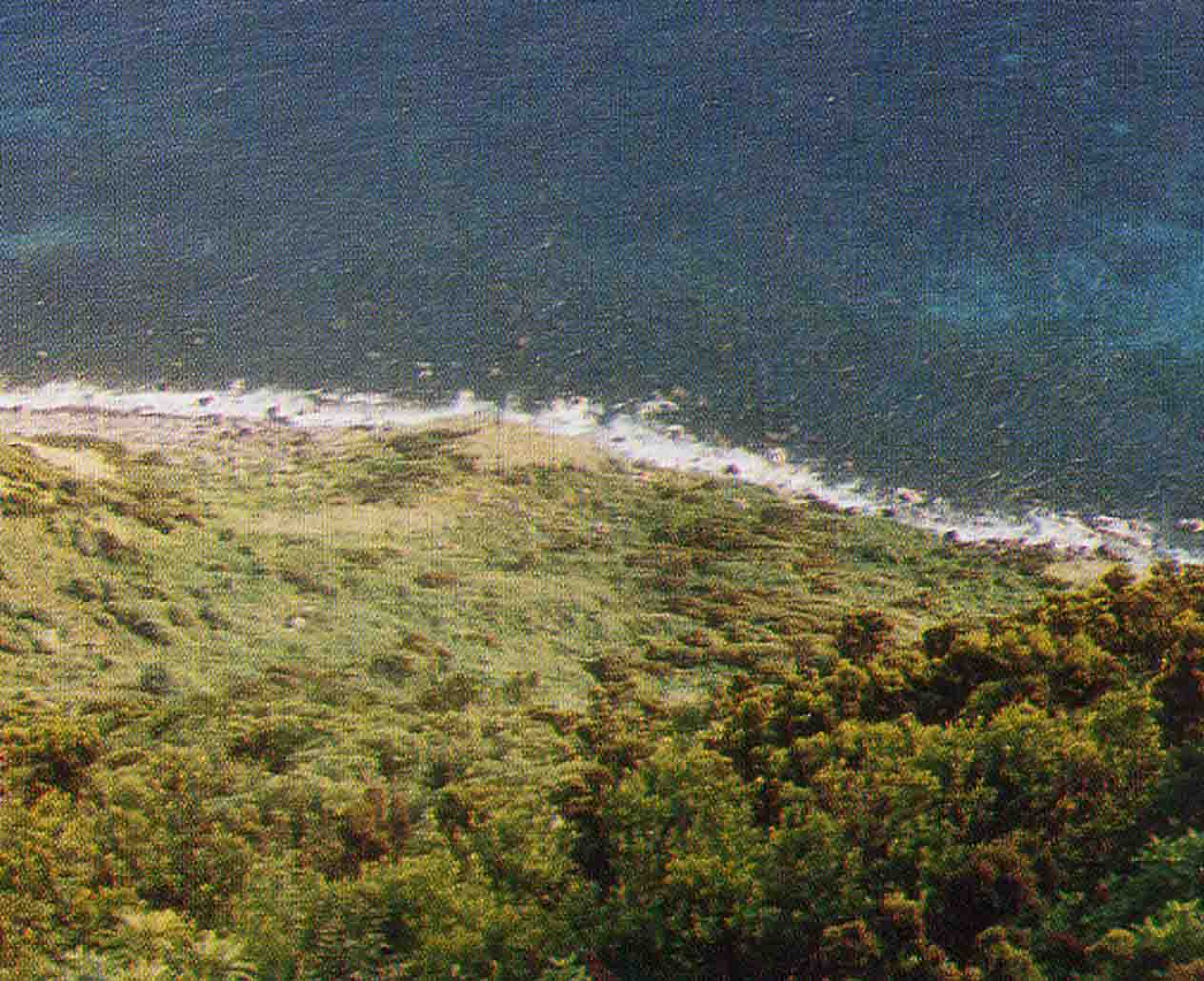
- The abandoned debris field of Fajã de Fernando Afonso, used to cultivate small vineyards
- Interactive map of Fajã de Fernando Afonso
- Location: Rosais, São Jorge, Central, Azores, Portugal
- Coordinates: 38°44′38″N 28°15′50″W
- Visitors: Accessible by foot, yet restricted during periods of inclimate weather
- Geographic detail from Portuguese Army map

The Fajã de Fernando Afonso is a permanent debris field formed by collapsing cliffs on the northern coast of the civil parish of Rosais, in the municipality of Velas, island of São Jorge, in the Portuguese archipelago of the Azores.

== History ==
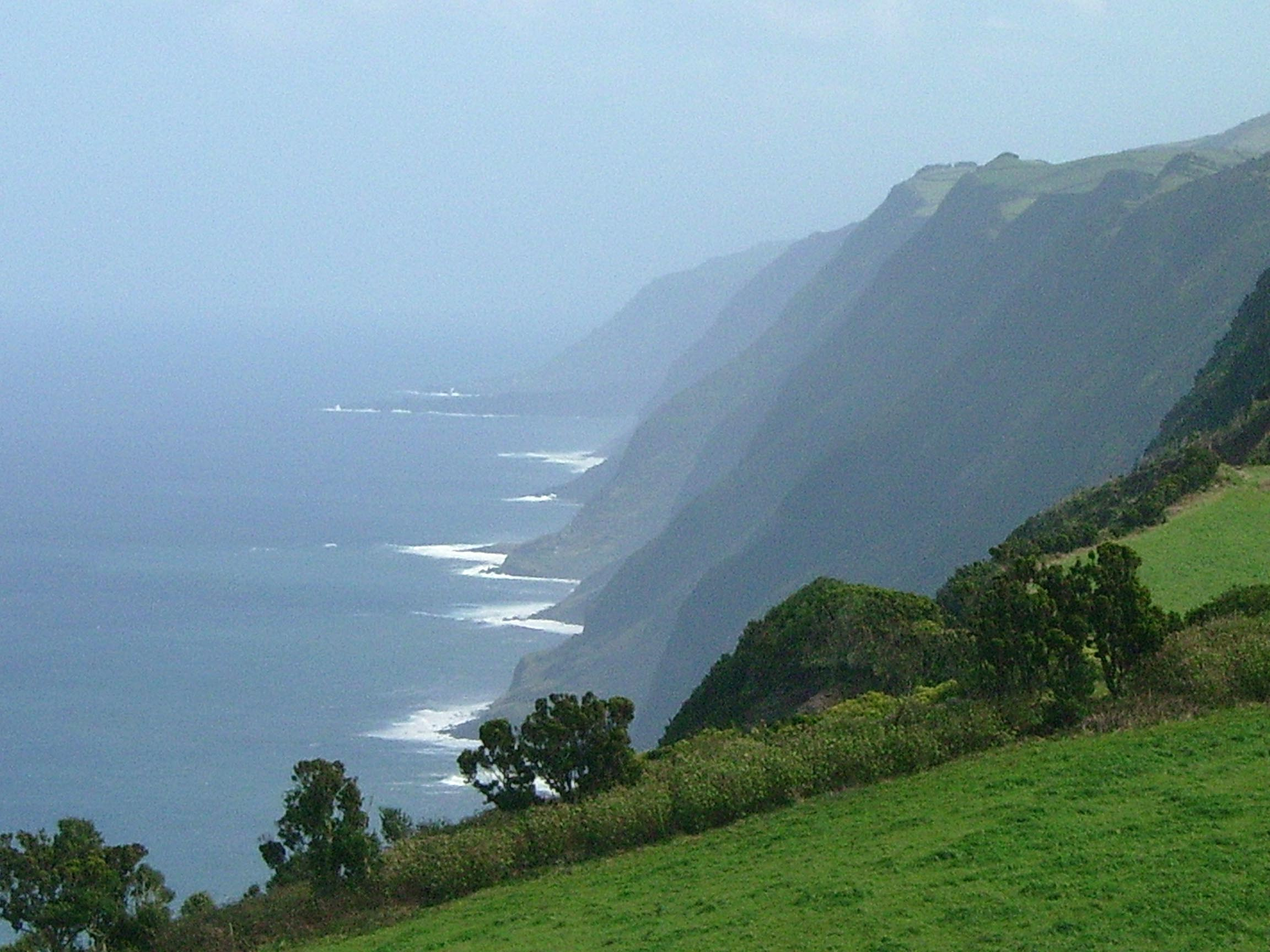
The view from the scenic overlook leading to the fajã in the Sete Fontes Recreational Park

The fajã was named for an early settler that occupied a home at the base of the cliff.

Following the 1 January 1980 earthquake the area was temporarily abandoned, owing to its instability and the aftershocks. Because of the danger, farmers returned to the area to only cultivate their small vineyards. A subsequent aftershock was responsible for the destruction of an important fountain bringing fresh water to the area. There are a few houses on this fajã used by some residents during the growing season, when the cultivation of assorted vegetables, potatoes and vineyards.

Situated between Fajã Amaro da Cunha and Fajã Mata Sete, the area is part of the Park of Sete Fontes and can be seen by a scenic overlook (the Miradouro da Fajã de Fernando Afonso).

== See also ==
- List of fajãs in the Azores
