= List of fajãs in the Azores =

The following is a list of the fajãs of the islands of the Azores:

== Faial ==
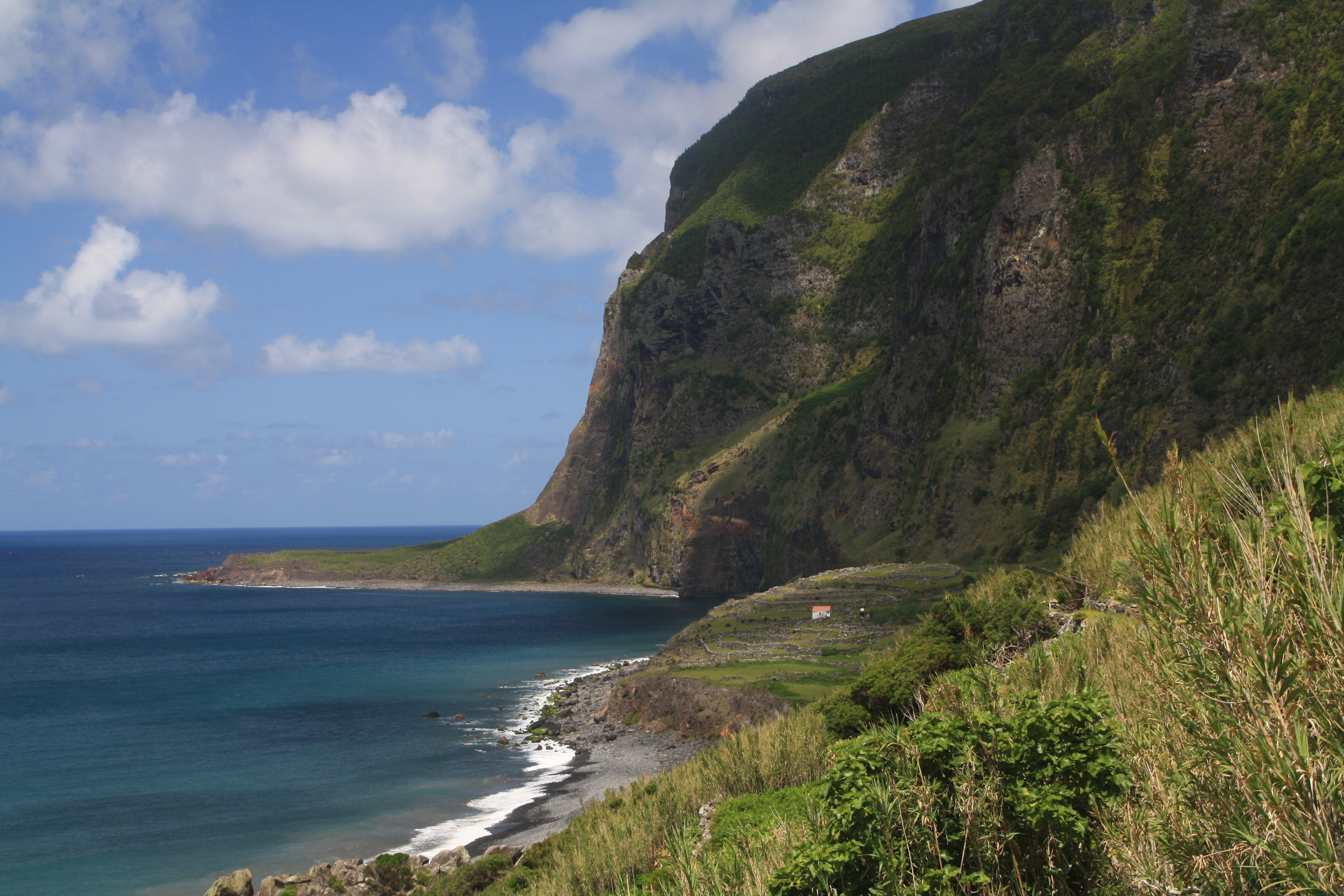
The small scenic fajã of Lopo Vaz, across from its islet, on the island of Flores

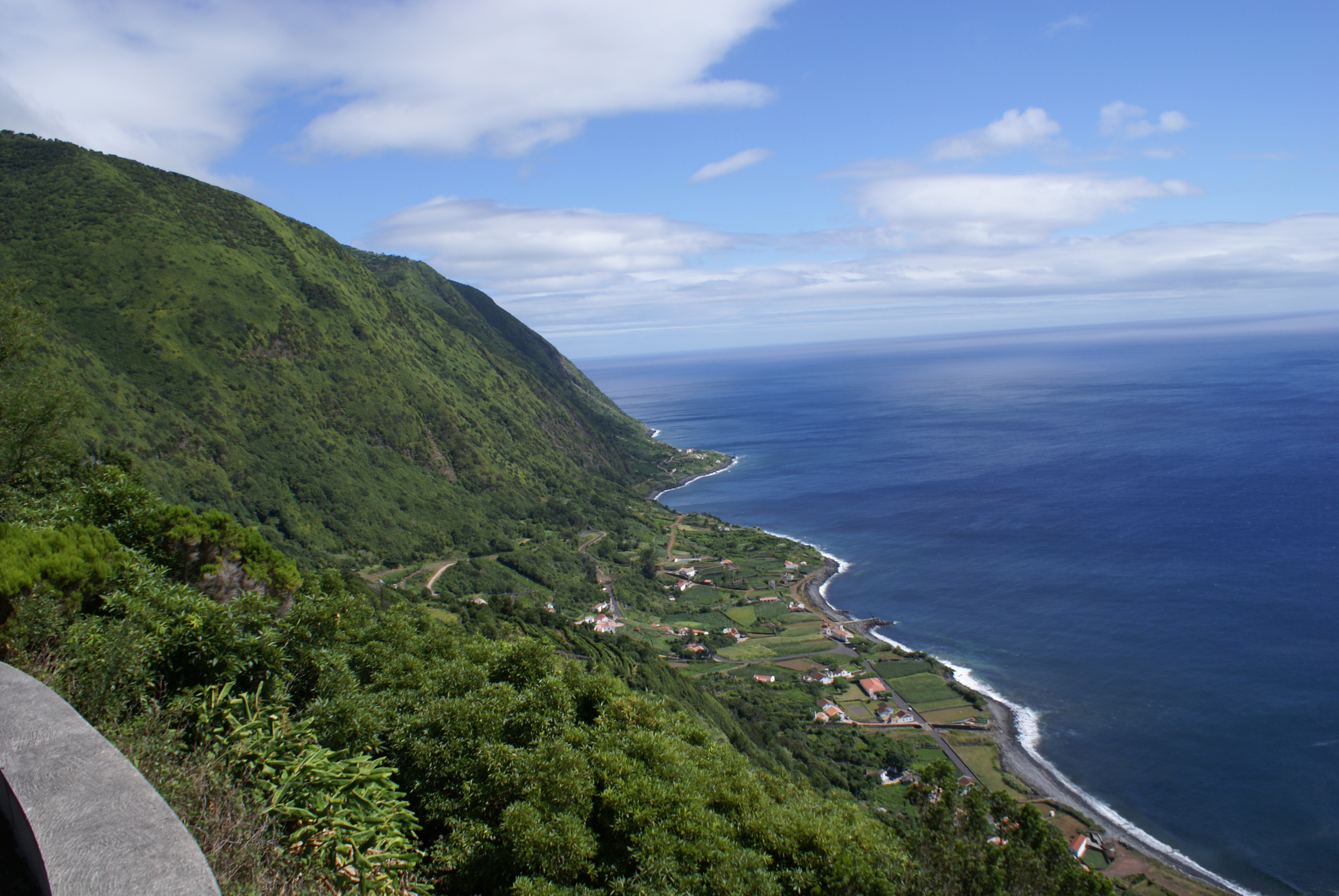
One of the few road access fajãs, Fajã dos Vimes is a rare location of coffee cultivation, in the municipality of Calheta, São Jorge

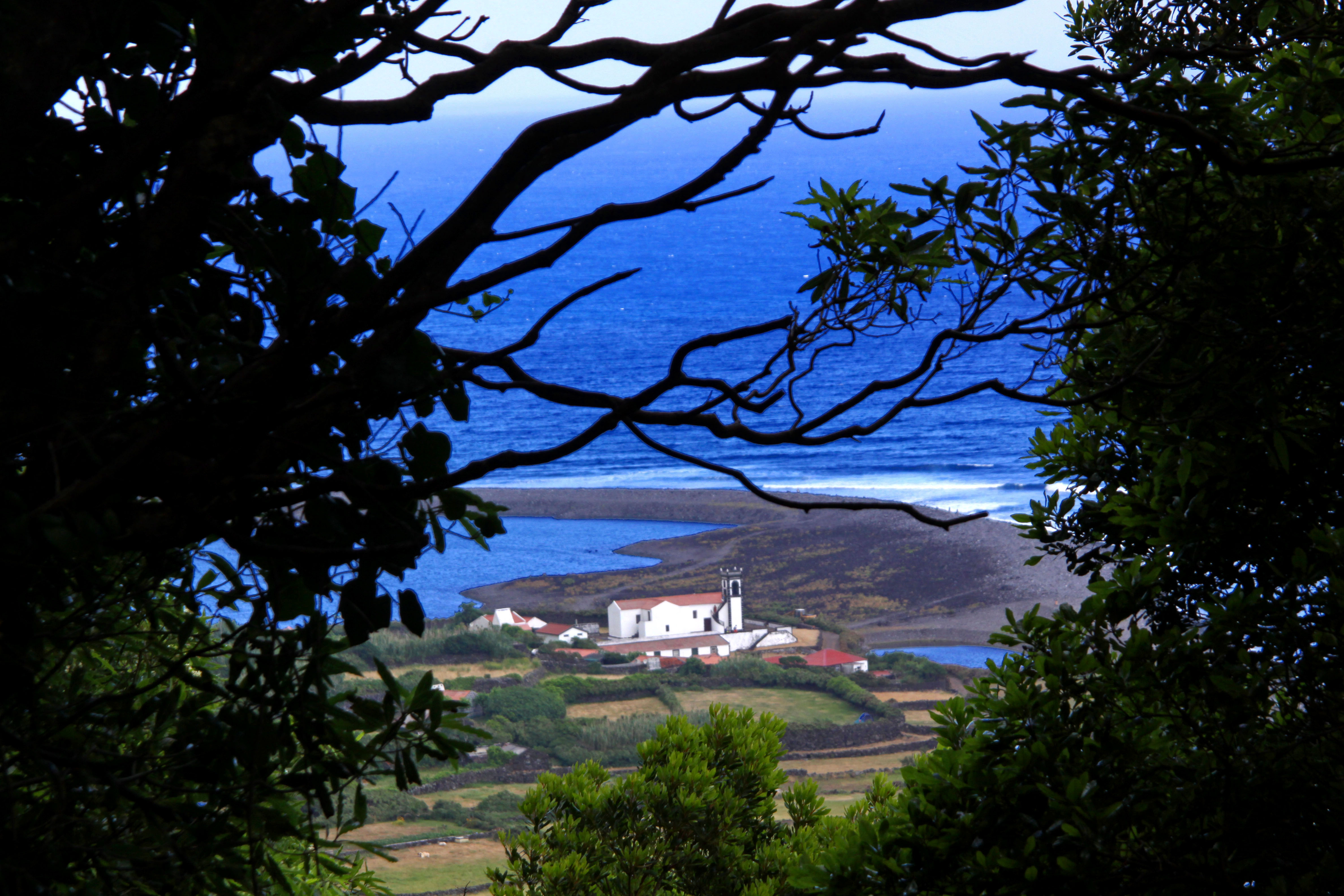
A glimpse of the Church of Santo Cristo in the Fajã da Caldeira do Santo Cristo: access if only possible by trail to this fajã in the municipality of Calheta, São Jorge

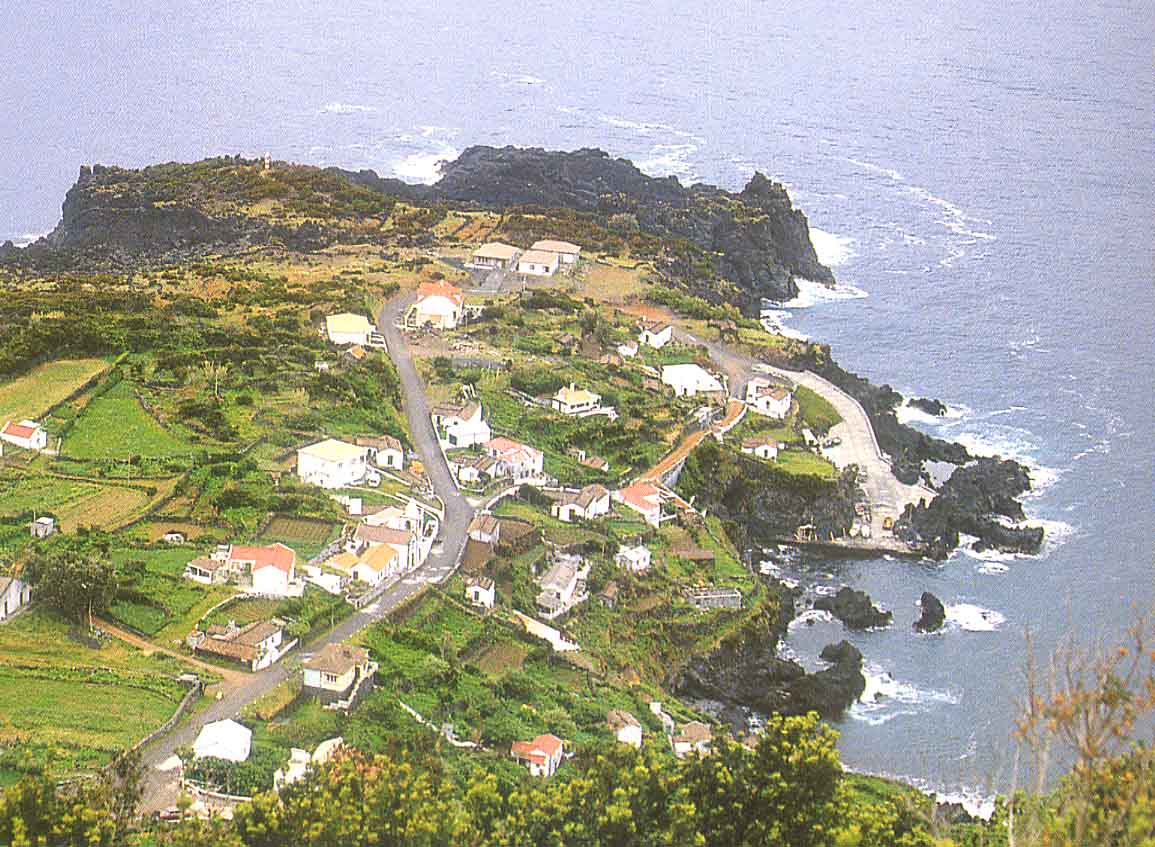
The most populous of the inhabited fajãs, Fajã do Ouvidor is protected by rocky cliffs, in the municipality of Velas, São Jorge

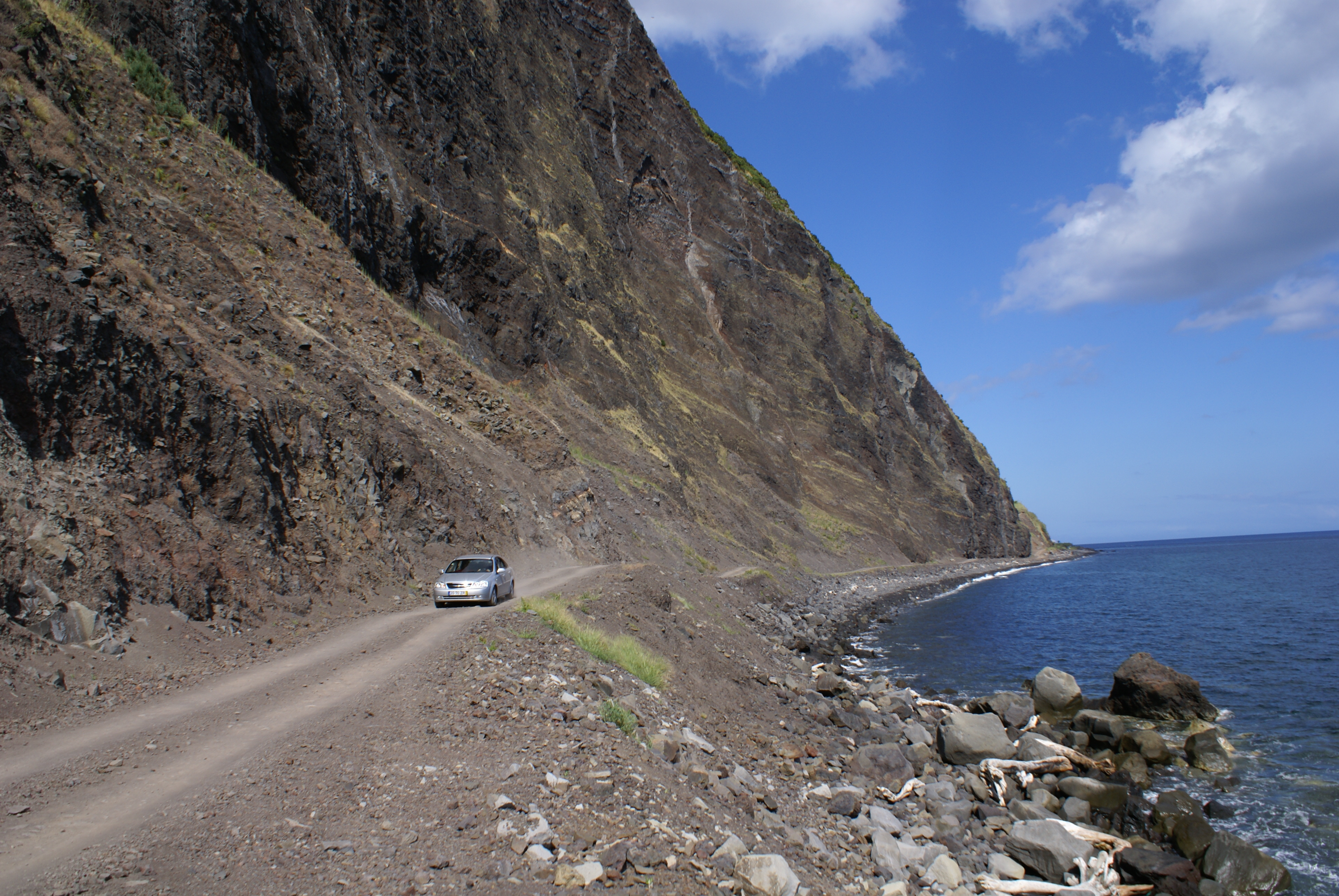
The access road to Fajã do Calhau on the southern coast of São Migue, civil parish of Água Retorta, in the municipality of Povoaçãol

- Fajã do Varadouro (Castelo Branco, Horta)
- Fajã da Praia do Norte (Praia do Norte, Horta)

== Flores ==
- Fajã de Lopo Vaz (Lajes, Lajes das Flores)
- Fajã da Ponta Ruiva (Cedros, Santa Cruz das Flores
- Fajã do Conde (Santa Cruz, Santa Cruz das Flores)

== Graciosa ==
- Fajã da Folga
- Fajã da Beira Mar

== Pico ==
- Fajã da Baixa (Piedade, Lajes do Pico)
- Fajã do Calhau (Piedade, Lajes do Pico)

== São Jorge ==
- Fajã d'Alem (Norte Grande, Velas)
- Fajã da Abelheira
- Fajã da Betesga
- Fajã da Caldeira de Cima
- Fajã da Caldeira de Santo Cristo
- Fajã da Choupana
- Fajã da Ermida (Rosais, Velas)
- Fajã da Fonte do Nicolau
- Fajã da Fragueira
- Fajã da Neca
- Fajã Pelada (Velas, Velas)
- Fajã da Penedia
- Fajã da Ponta Furada
- Fajã do Mero (Norte Pequeno, Calheta)
- Fajã da Ponta Nova
- Fajã da Ribeira da Areia
- Fajã da Ribeira Funda
- Fajã da Rocha (Fajã da Coqueira)
- Fajã da Saramagueira
- Fajã da Vereda Vermelha
- Fajã das Almas
- Fajã das Barreiras
- Fajã das Cubas (Fajã da Baleia)
- Fajã das Fajanetas
- Fajã das Feiteiras
- Fajã das Funduras
- Fajã das Pontas
- Fajã de Além
- Fajã de Entre Poios (Velas, Velas)
- Fajã de Entre Ribeiras
- Fajã de Fernando Afonso (Rosais, Velas)
- Fajã de João Dias (Rosais, Velas)
- Fajã de Manuel Teixeira
- Fajã de Santo Amaro
- Fajã de São João (Santo Antão, Calheta)
- Fajã de Vasco Martins
- Fajã do Belo (Ribeira Seca, Calheta)
- Fajã do Boi (Rosais, Velas)
- Fajã do Calhau Rolado (Rosais, Velas)
- Fajã do Caminho do Meio
- Fajã do Canto
- Fajã do Cardoso
- Fajã do Castelhano
- Fajã do Cavalete
- Fajã do Centeio (Rosais, Velas)
- Fajã do Cerrado das Silvas (Velas, Velas)
- Fajã do Cruzal
- Fajã do Ginjal
- Fajã do Labaçal
- Fajã do Lemos
- Fajã do Negro
- Fajã do Norte Estreito
- Fajã do Norte das Fajãs
- Fajã do Nortezinho
- Fajã do Salto Verde
- Fajã do Sanguinhal
- Fajã do Ouvidor
- Fajã do Pedregalo (Rosais, Velas)
- Fajã do Valado (Rosais, Velas)
- Fajã dos Azevinhos
- Fajã dos Bodes
- Fajã dos Cubres (Ribeira Seca, Calheta)
- Fajã dos Tijolos (Ribeira Seca, Calheta)
- Fajã dos Vimes
- Fajã Amaro da Cunha (Rosais, Velas)
- Fajã Chã
- Fajã Fajanzinha
- Fajã Isabel Pereira
- Fajã Maria Pereira (Rosais, Velas)
- Fajã Mata Sete (Rosais, Velas)
- Fajã Rasa
- Fajã Redonda

== São Miguel ==
- Fajã do Araújo (Nordeste, Nordeste)
- Fajã do Calhau (Água Retorta, Povoação)

== Terceira ==
- Fajã do Fischer
- Fajãzinha
- Fajã da Serreta
