= Fajã do Pedregalo =

Permanent debris field in the Portuguese archipelago of the Azores

- Location: Rosais, São Jorge, Central, Azores, Portugal
- Visitors: Accessible by foot, yet restricted during periods of inclement weather
- Operator: Secretário Regional do Ambiente e do Mar
- Geographic detail from CAOP (2010) produced by Instituto Geográfico Português (IGP)

The Fajã do Pedregalo, is a permanent debris field, built from the collapsing cliffs on the northern coast of the civil parish of Rosais, in the municipality of Velas, island of São Jorge, in the Portuguese archipelago of the Azores.

Located near Fajã de Fernando Afonso it is accessible from a small trail, where transport is difficult.

Although it has never been inhabited, the fajã is used to raise livestock and cultivate some crops, including potato. This region is also popular with artisanal/local fishers.

== See also ==
- List of fajãs in the Azores
