= Fajã do Centeio =

- Interactive map of Fajã do Centeio
- Location: Rosais, São Jorge, Central, Azores, Portugal
- Coordinates: 38°43′36″N 28°13′0″W
- Visitors: Accessible by foot, yet restricted during periods of inclimate weather
- Geographic detail from Portuguese Army map

The Fajã do Centeio is a permanent debris field, built from the collapsing cliffs on the northern coast of the civil parish of Rosais, in the municipality of Velas, island of São Jorge, in the Portuguese archipelago of the Azores. This area is accessible from two trails from Fajã de João Dias.

There are few habitable homes, since most of the area was abandoned after the 1980 earthquake. Today, those buildings still in use are occupied in the summer or during the growing season. Owing to its distance from potable water the area is supported by cisterns, normally used for the cultivation of vineyards, corn, potatoes, wheat, and a few other crops.

== See also ==
- List of fajãs in the Azores
