= Fajã do Calhau Rolado =

Permanent debris field in the Portuguese archipelago of the Azores

- Fajã
- Location: Rosais, São Jorge Island
- Access: Accessible by foot, yet restricted during periods of unfavourable weather

The Fajã do Calha Rolado is a permanent debris field at the foot of the crumbling cliffs on the northern coast of the civil parish of Rosais, in the municipality of Velas, on the island of São Jorge, in the Portuguese archipelago of the Azores.

The cliff is visited by numerous tourists in the summer. It is particularly busy in September, at the time of harvest: Yam is a crop that is widely grown in the district, although the local climate is arid. In the past, pigs were slaughtered there. A festival is held in June.

== See also ==
- List of fajãs in the Azores
