= Fajã das Pontas =

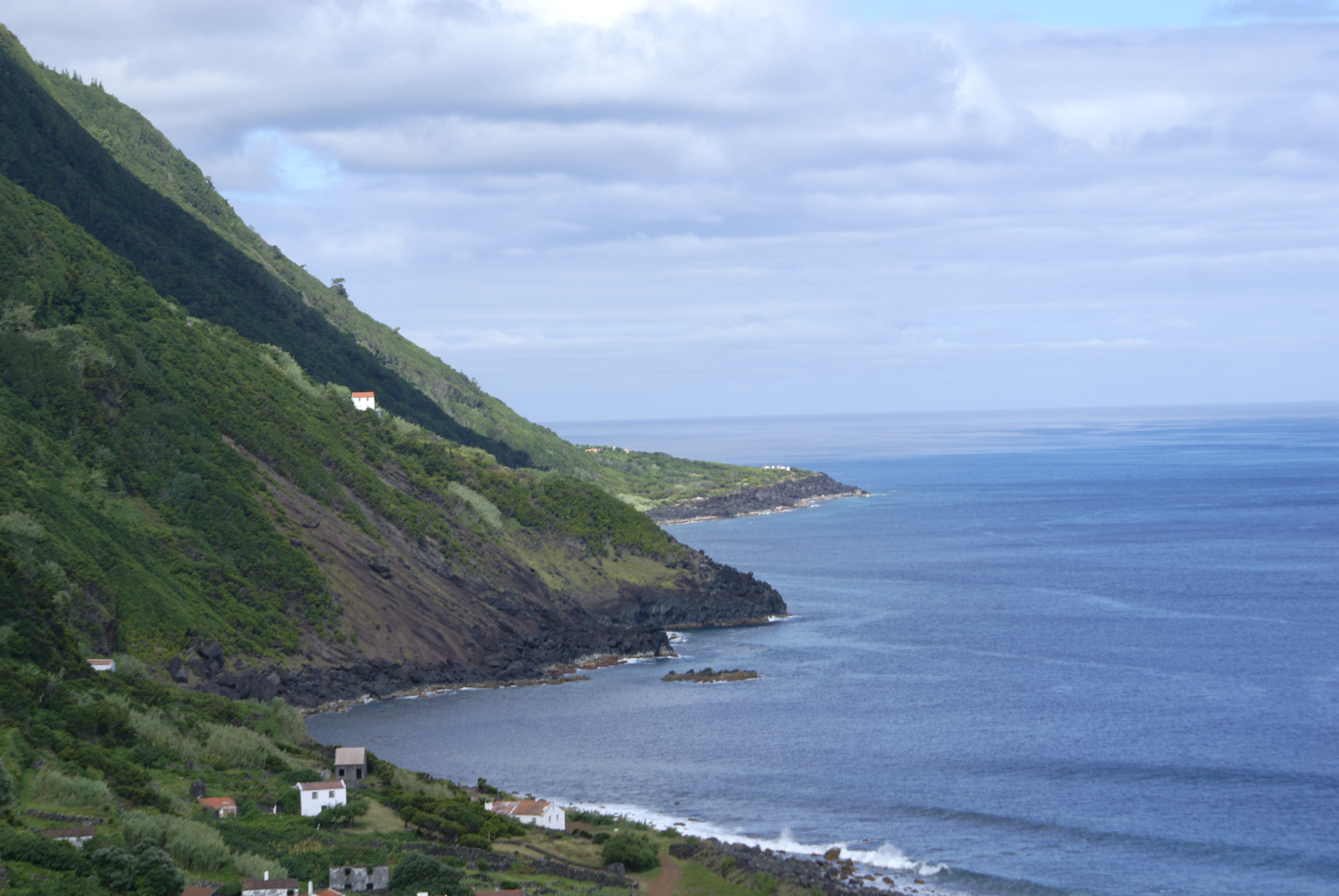
- A view of the escarpment and fajã along the northern coast
- Interactive map of Fajã das Pontas
- Location: Norte Pequeno, São Jorge, Central, Azores, Portugal
- Coordinates: 38°39′22″N 27°59′33″W
- Visitors: Accessible by foot, yet restricted during periods of inclimate weather
- Geographic detail from Portuguese Army map

The Fajã das Pontas is a permanent debris field, known as a fajã, built from the collapsing cliffs on the northern coast of the civil parish of Norte Pequeno, in the municipality of Calheta, island of São Jorge, in the Portuguese archipelago of the Azores.

== Geography ==
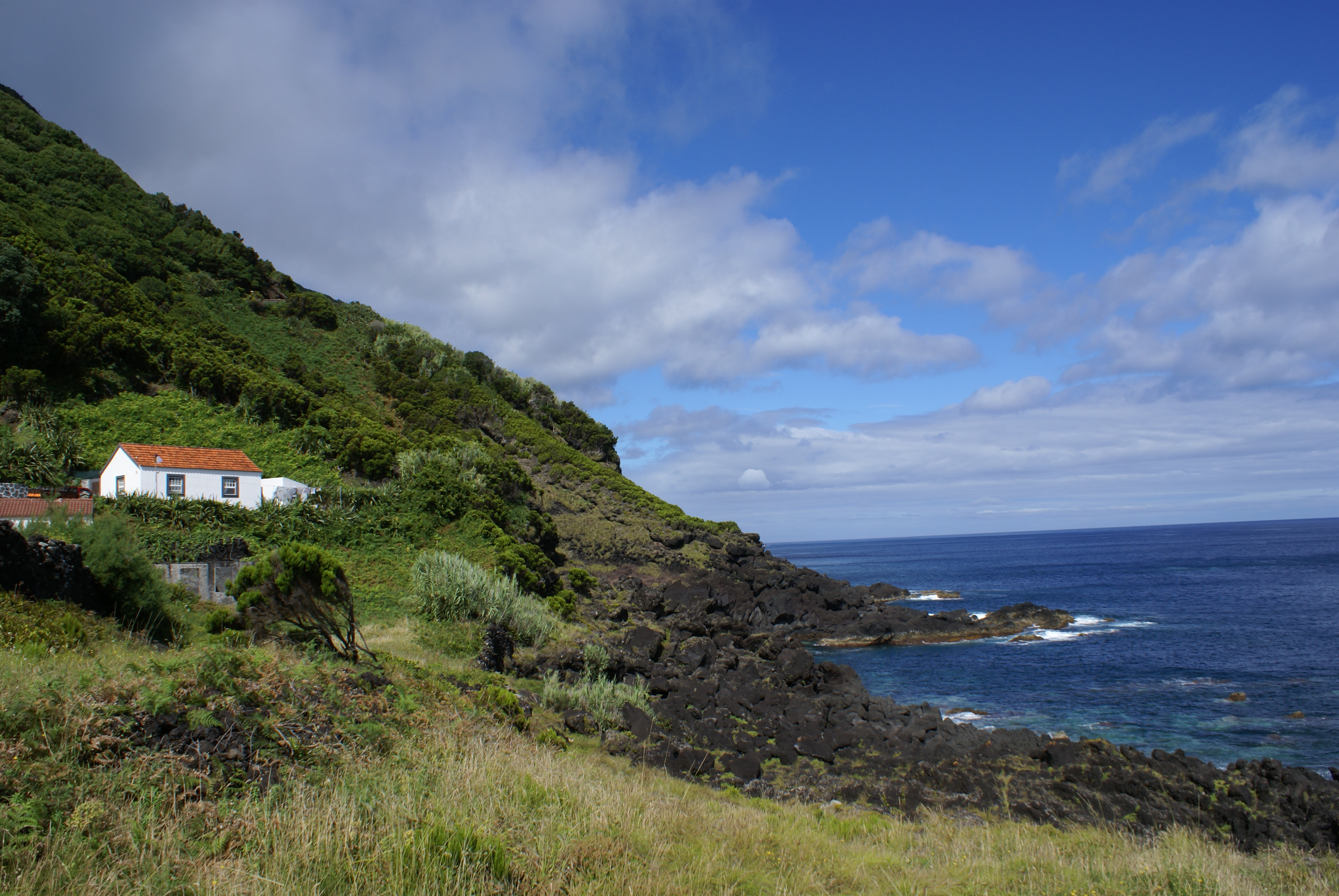
A fews of the buildings on the debris field

The fajã is accessible from the trail that descends to Fajã da Penedia, where it forks, one side to Fajã das Pontas.

There are approximately 15 residences, 11 haylofts, a fountain and tidal pool, in addition to six lines to transport kindling (little used). A small port and swimming area is located by the coast, but fajã blies the fact that there are no permanent residents at the location. The region is primarily used to cultivate some vineyards, corn fields and other vegetables, in addition to chestnut and fig trees.

== See also ==
- List of fajãs in the Azores
