= Fajã Pelada =

- Interactive map of Fajã Pelada
- Location: Velas, São Jorge, Central, Azores, Portugal
- Coordinates: 38°43′3″N 28°11′28″W
- Visitors: Accessible by foot, yet restricted during periods of inclimate weather
- Geographic detail from Portuguese Army map

The Fajã Pelada is a permanent debris field, known as a fajã, built from the collapsing cliffs on the northern coast of the civil parish of Velas, in the municipality of the same name, island of São Jorge, in the Portuguese archipelago of the Azores.

The fajã is situated between Fajã de Entre Poios and Fajã do Cerrado das Silvas, accessible along the coast over pedestrian trails. Two streams intersect the fajã: the intermittent Ribeira da Pelada (on the western margin) and the Ribeira do Calhau Miúdo (on the eastern edge). In addition, there are permanent springs.

== See also ==
- List of fajãs in the Azores
