= Fajã do Valado =

Geographical object in Portugal

- Interactive map of Fajã do Valado
- Location: Rosais, São Jorge, Central, Azores, Portugal
- Coordinates: 38°43′26″N 28°12′39″W
- Visitors: Accessible by foot, yet restricted during periods of inclement weather
- Geographic detail from Portuguese Army map

The Fajã do Valado is a permanent debris field, built from the collapsing cliffs on the northern coast of the civil parish of Rosais, in the municipality of Velas, island of São Jorge, in the Portuguese archipelago of the Azores.

== See also ==
- List of fajãs in the Azores
