= Fajã do Mero =

Debris field in the Azores

- Interactive map of Fajã do Mero
- Location: Norte Pequeno, São Jorge, Central, Azores, Portugal
- Coordinates: 38°39′54″N 28°0′52″W
- Visitors: Accessible by foot, yet restricted during periods of inclimate weather
- Geographic detail from Portuguese Army map

The Fajã do Mero (or alternately Fajã da Ponta Grossa) is a debris field, known as a fajã, built from the collapsing cliffs on the northern coast of the civil parish of Norte Pequeno, in the municipality of Calheta, island of São Jorge, in the Portuguese archipelago of the Azores.

== History ==
Little history is known about the annual settlers of this settlement, but local oral history spoke of one settler, João Válido, who established a well and cultivated coriander.

== Geography ==
Fajã do Mero is located between Fajã Chã and Fajã das Funduras, just following Fajã da Penedia, along the northern coast of the island of São Jorge, is only accessible by trail from the neighbouring fajãs and central island. Most of the road to Mero is dirt path, with some improvements occupying in 2007, but remaining largely a footpath from Norte Pequeno and Fajã da Penedia. Unlike other fajãs, Mero is situated at the top of a steep cliff, over the Fajã Chã.

Mero is served by watercourses annually, with permanent ravines and Sete Fontes spring proving potable water. The spring was also captured by the municipality of Calheta in order to serve the communities of Norte Pequeno, Calheta and Ribera Seca, inaugurated by President João Amaral on 17 July 1991.

The path from Fajã da Penedia crosses natural vegetation, with many plants typical of endemic Macronesian flora, while providing picturesque views between sugarcane and Azorean juniper. Bird species in this area are limited to migratory and marine birds such as seagulls and shearwater, while the rocky beach also permits the capture of some fish.

While at one time the area was inhabited constantly by a few tenant farmers, today the region is mostly abandoned, were a few agricultural activities still occur, owing to the difficult descent/ascent. The area was used to cultivate fava beans, grapes, potato, squash and local tarot, which was abundant in the margins of the ravine.

== Architecture ==
There are a small group of support buildings for rural activities, including a casa de despejo (storehouse) and palheiro (hayloft/barn), located along the path giving access to Fajã do Mero. From the a small isolated parcel, located a level area towards the sea. The rectangular casa de despejo is only one floor, with door, with its principal orientation towards the northeast, built from masonry and lose stone. The door is preceded by a small landing served by a small circular staircase. The two-story barn, towards the east, is located alongside a rectangular wall on two levels: one floor is used to shelter animals and the second-floor for storage of hay (which is accessible from a lateral door to the roadway in the southeast).

== See also ==
- List of fajãs in the Azores
