= Fajã das Almas =

- Interactive map of Fajã das Almas
- Location: Manadas, São Jorge, Central, Azores, Portugal
- Coordinates: 38°37′40″N 28°4′34″W
- Named for: Souls
- Visitors: Accessible by foot, yet restricted during periods of inclimate weather
- Geographic detail from Portuguese Army map

The Fajã das Almas, also known as Fajã do Calhau, is a debris field, known as a fajã, built from the collapsing cliffs on the southern coast of the civil parish of Manadas, in the municipality of Velas, island of São Jorge, in the Portuguese archipelago of the Azores.

== History ==
This fajã contains two hermitages, the Hermitage of Nossa Senhora das Almas, situated in the area of Barbós, and the Hermitage of Santo Cristo, constructed in 1876. On 9 September 1880, the hermitage of Santo Cristo suffered a fire, and was reconstructed through initiatives of the Baron of Ribeiro, Francisco José de Bettencourt e Ávila, and was consecrated on 14 January 1882. Near this church is a cistern, which was also ordered built by the Baron, who was one of the principal proprietors of the fajã.

In 1981, the fajã had 78 residents, but along the preceding years, this population slowly decreased to the point that there were only five permanent inhabitants.

Yet, through the reconstruction of the accessway to the fajã, the number of buildings in the fajã have increased, principally by emigrants.

== Geography ==
It is accessed by a roadway that winds down to fajã, to a platform with limited parking. From this point the homes and coastal area reachable by foot or by small single-engine vehicles.

The port is used for small-scale fishing, from along the coast and in the channel, which includes the capture of Gadiformes such as Atlantic horse mackerel. The more frequent migratory and marine birds in the fajã include: sea-gulls, terns, shearwaters, kites, blackbirds and even wild ducks, as well as occasionally sandpipers.

Due to the rich ecosystem the fajã is part of the IBA that includes the coast from Ribeira da Fajã das Almas until the ravine of Pico das Brenhas. This IBA comprises a long strip of coast, that includes examples of Azorina vidalii and Perrexil-do-mar.

== See also ==
- List of fajãs in the Azores
