= Fajã do Cerrado das Silvas =

- Interactive map of Fajã do Cerrado das Silvas
- Location: Velas, São Jorge, Central, Azores, Portugal
- Coordinates: 38°43′2″N 28°11′9″W
- Visitors: Accessible by foot, yet restricted during periods of inclement weather
- Geographic detail from Portuguese Army map

The Fajã do Cerrado das Silvas, is a permanent debris field, built from the collapsing cliffs on the northern coast of the civil parish of Velas, in the municipality of Velas, island of São Jorge, in the Portuguese archipelago of the Azores.

Located between Fajã Pelada and Fajã da Choupana it is accessible from a small trail, where transport is difficult.

== See also ==
- List of fajãs in the Azores
