= Fajã Mata Sete =

Geologic formation on São Jorge, Azores, Portugal

- Interactive map of Fajã Mata Sete
- Location: Rosais, São Jorge, Central, Azores, Portugal
- Coordinates: 38°45′16″N 28°18′24″W
- Visitors: Accessible by foot, yet restricted during periods of inclement weather
- Geographic detail from Portuguese Army map

The Fajã Mata Sete (literally, "fajã that kills seven") is a debris field (fajã) formed over time by collapsing cliffs on the northern coast of the civil parish of Rosais, in the municipality of Velas, on the island of São Jorge in the Portuguese archipelago of the Azores.

== History ==
Unlike many other Azorean fajãs, Fajã Mata Sete has never had a permanent human population. However, the area has several small homes and outbuildings supporting seasonal visitors. The fajã's fertility and favorable microclimate allowed cultivation of wine grapes, potatoes, corn, fruit, and taro in small garden plots. Owners of these plots would descend the cliff-face between the months of March and April to cultivate the land and return in September for the harvest. For efficiency, they pressed the wine grapes in the fajã using rudimentary stone presses: liquid wine in jugs is easier to transport than fragile and perishable grapes.

On the fajã is a cave locally called Furna ("fumarole" or "hot spring") which was historically used as overnight shelter by fishermen and other visitors to the fajã. It is relatively large, accommodating seven or eight people. It is conceivable the cave's capacity gave Fajã Mata Sete ("fajã that kills seven") its curious name.

Several trails within the plateau of Rosais provide access to the fajã and surrounding area near the lighthouse of Ponta dos Rosais. The fajã is visible from the edge of the northern area of the Rosais clifftop, and dotted by a few homes interspersed within thick vegetation.

== Geology ==
The Fajã Mata Sete is a debris field (fajã) formed over time by collapsing cliffs. In the bay that formed from the fajã, alongside the Ponta dos Rosais, is a large volcanic stack called the Torrão de Açúcar (Tower of Sugar). Its name derives from the stack's geological composition, which includes a basalt base surmounted by softer reddish deposits of consolidated pyroclasts.

Following a 1 January 1980 earthquake, the debris field began eroding away. After the earthquake access to the fajã was restricted due to its instability, resulting in the temporary closure of the lighthouse of Ponta dos Rosais. By 2012 the fajã was reduced in size so significantly it may be considered to no longer exist.

== Biology ==
The cliffs around the fajã are home to nesting families of Cory's shearwater, gulls, terns, and other marine birds.

== See also ==
- List of fajãs in the Azores
