= Fajã de São João =

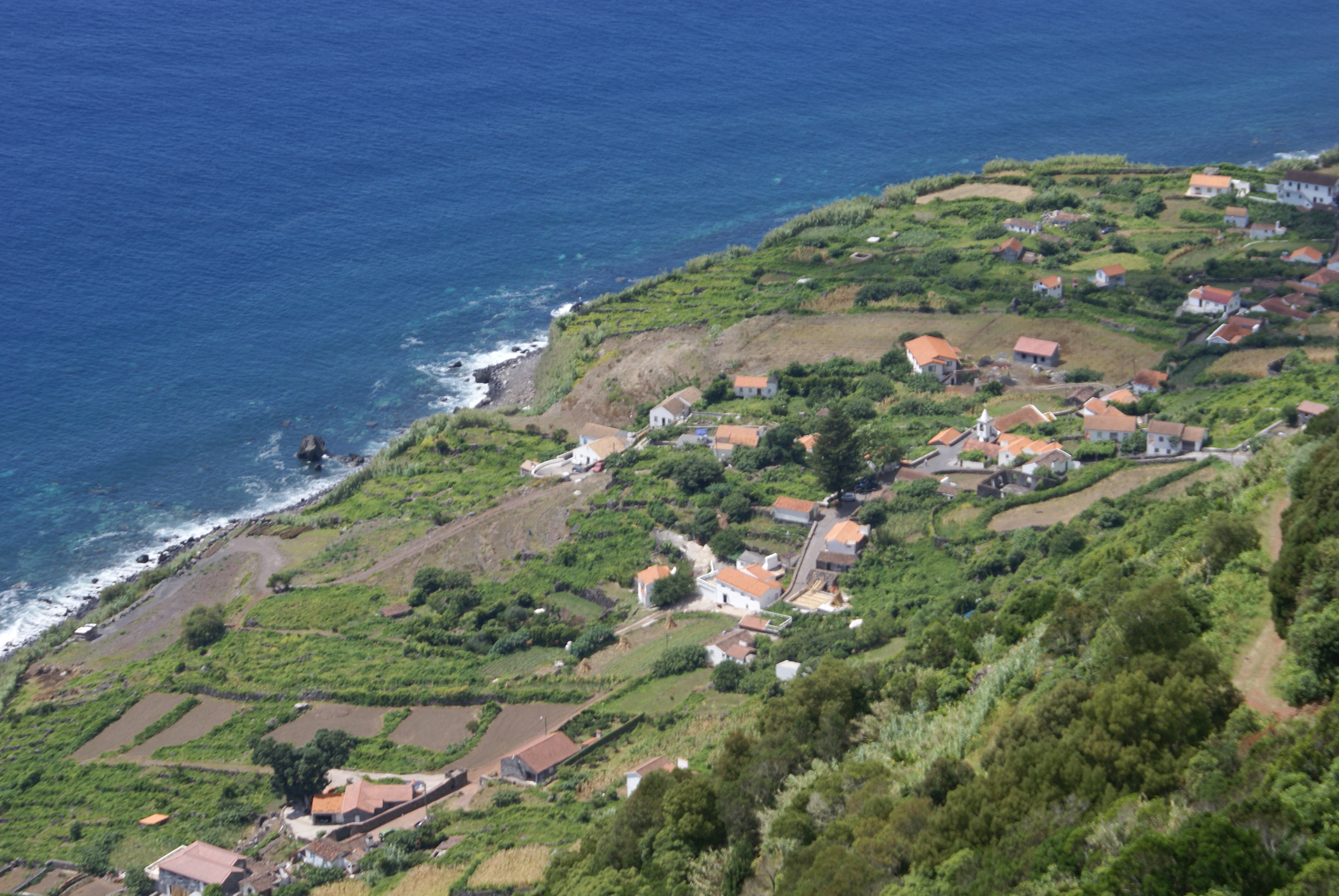
- A view of the Fajã of São João, ridges and the principal roadway leading to the coast
- Interactive map of Fajã de São João
- Location: Santo Antão, São Jorge, Central, Azores, Portugal
- Coordinates: 38°32′53″N 27°51′38″W
- Named for: John the Baptist
- Geographic detail from Portuguese Army map

The Fajã de São João is a permanent debris field, built from the collapsing cliffs on the northern coast of the civil parish of Santo Antão, in the municipality of Calheta, island of São Jorge, in the Portuguese archipelago of the Azores.

== History ==
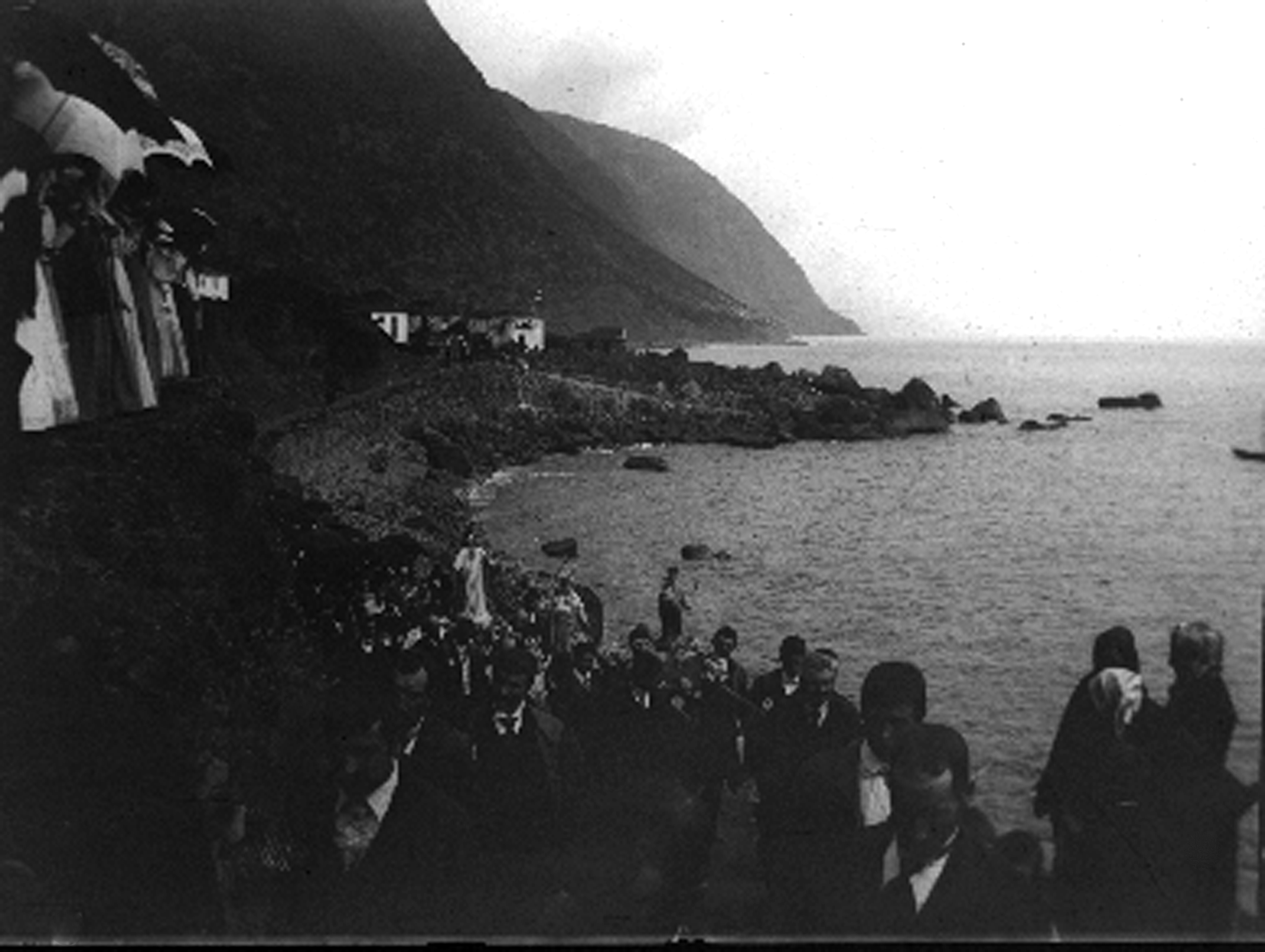
The religious procession of the feast of Nossa Senhora da Guia at the turn of the century

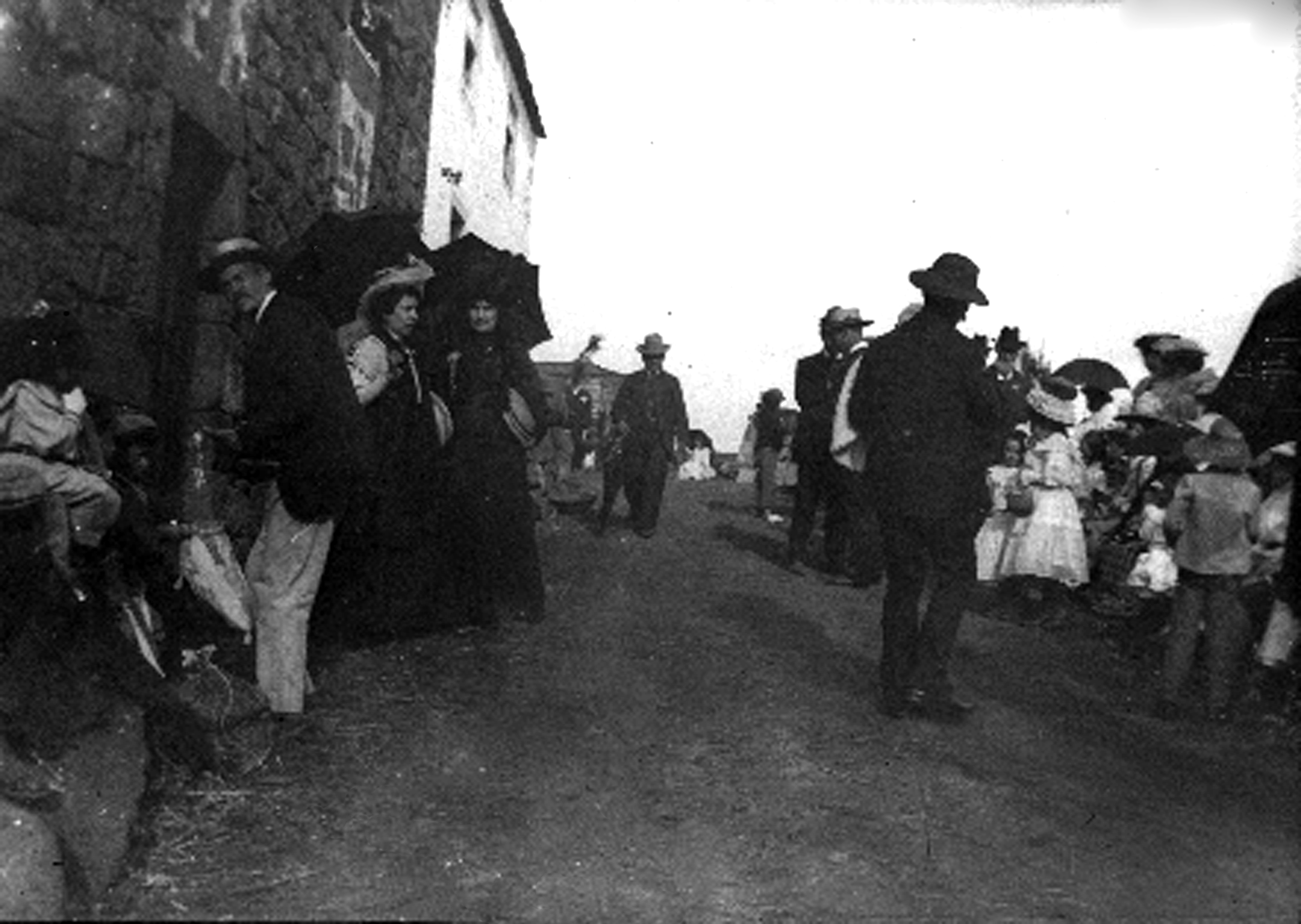
A view of the people congregating along the roadway during a popular feast

Owing to the abundant sources of water, resulting from large waterfalls, and the extraordinary microclimate, the fajã was permanently inhabited from 1550 to 1560. The micro-climate permitted the cultivation of vineyards and fruits, such as figs, walnuts, oranges, apples, chestnuts and pineapples, including limited production of coffee beans. The small hermitage was constructed around 1550, to satisfy the vows of Father Diogo de Matos da Silveira, who wanted to a religious temple for the small community.

In 1625, Barbary coast pirates attacked this part of the coast, capturing several of the early inhabitants, who were sent as captives to North Africa. As a result of this incident, a small fort was constructed near the port, but this did not limit future incursions. In 1686, pirates from Salé disembarked, without a shot being fired from the fort. These privateers then demolished the fort and sacked the homes and hermitage, destroying an image of St. John that existed at the site.

During the famed Mandado de Deus (Sent by God) earthquake, much of the resident population was lost under landslides (its effects are still visible along the coast). Reconstructed, it was hit again during the 1 January 1980 earthquake resulting in further destruction to the small population.

The fajã was used by several noble or rich families as their summer residences. Many of these families, such as the Noronhas, were owners of great properties, produced wine and sealed them in barrels, which were transported to Terceira. The Noronhas produced their wines and sent those barrels to their manorhouse in Villa Maria, then residence of José Pimentel Homem de Noronha (and his father the morgado João Inácio de Bettencourt Noronha), where they bottled and commercially sold their products.

Today, the fajã is an important producer of Jaquê wine, in addition to spirits, such as loquat and fig aguardiente. Although an insignificant contributor to the local economy, coffee beans were cultivated in the fajã intermittently.

== Geography ==
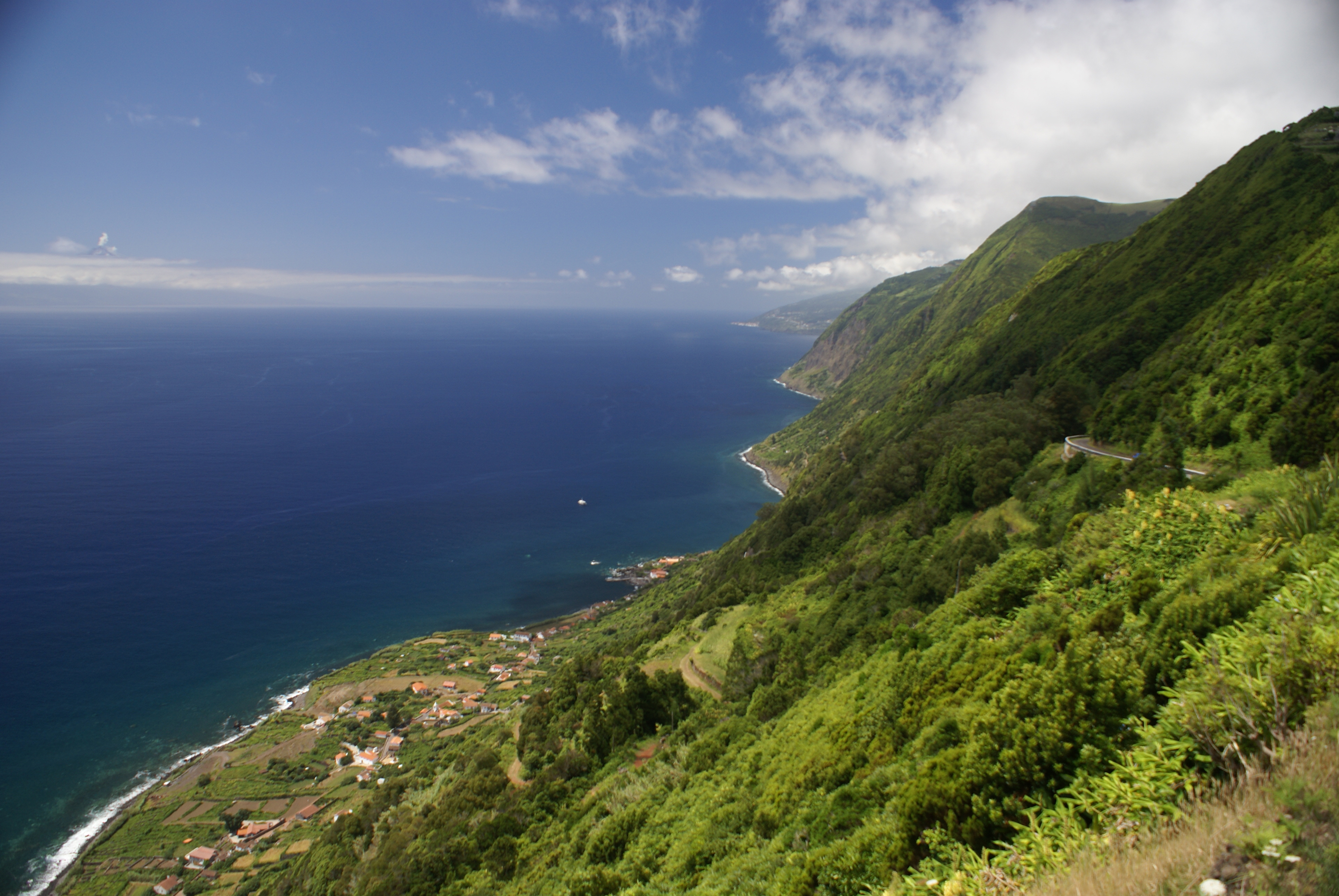
A view of the location of the fajã in the shadow of the steep escarpments of the Volcanic Complex of Topo

Fajã of São João is situated on the southern coast of São Jorge, along a strip of land in the shadow of the Topo Volcanic Complex.

Although there are several permanent residents, during the months of August and September, there is an influx of former-residents, in addition to visiting emigrants and tourists, who swell the population of the fajã.

== Economy ==
It is primarily recognized for its local café and the quality of its handicrafts, including blankets and quilts.

== Culture ==
The local hermitage, dedicated to the local patron saint (John the Baptist) was constructed in 1550, although its frontispiece suggests a date of 1762 (which refers to a period of restoration). The central spire was only added in 1895, but this iconic facade has made it one of the most photographed religious buildings on the island. As part of its cultural tradition, two major feasts occur annually: the feast of St. John (on 24 June) and the feast dedicated to Nossa Senhora da Guia (on 8 September).

== See also ==
- List of fajãs in the Azores
