= Fajã dos Vimes =

Permanent debris field known as a fajã in the Azores, Portugal

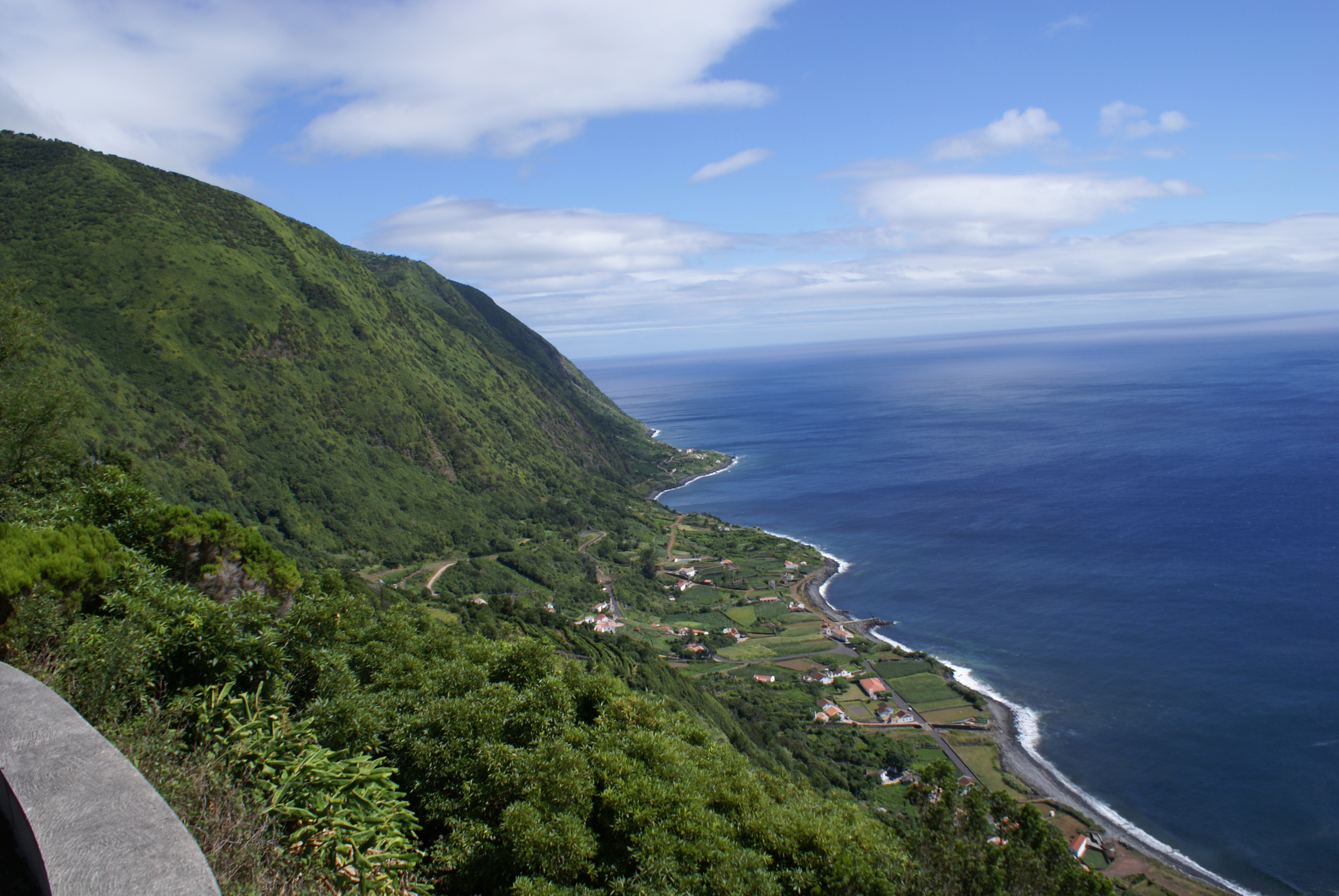
- A view of the Fajã from the coastal roadway leading down to the village
- Interactive map of Fajã dos Vimes
- Location: Ribeira Seca, São Jorge, Central, Azores, Portugal
- Coordinates: 38°35′5″N 27°55′54″W
- Named for: Wicker
- Geographic detail from Portuguese Army map

The Fajã dos Vimes is a permanent debris field, known as a fajã, built from the collapsing cliffs on the south coast of the civil parish of Ribeira Seca, in the municipality of Calheta, island of São Jorge, in the Portuguese archipelago of the Azores.

== History ==
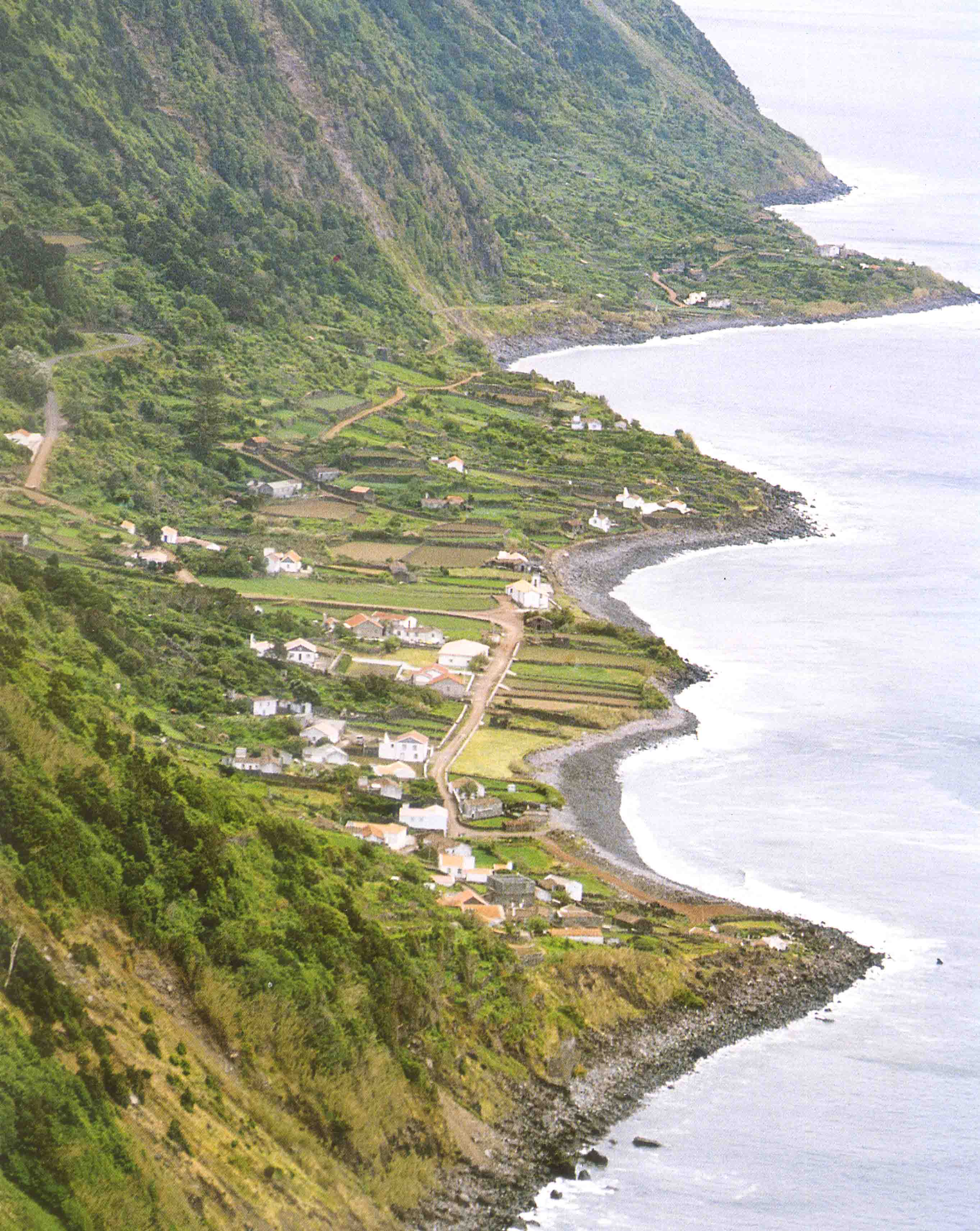
A view of the settlement of Fajã dos Vimes

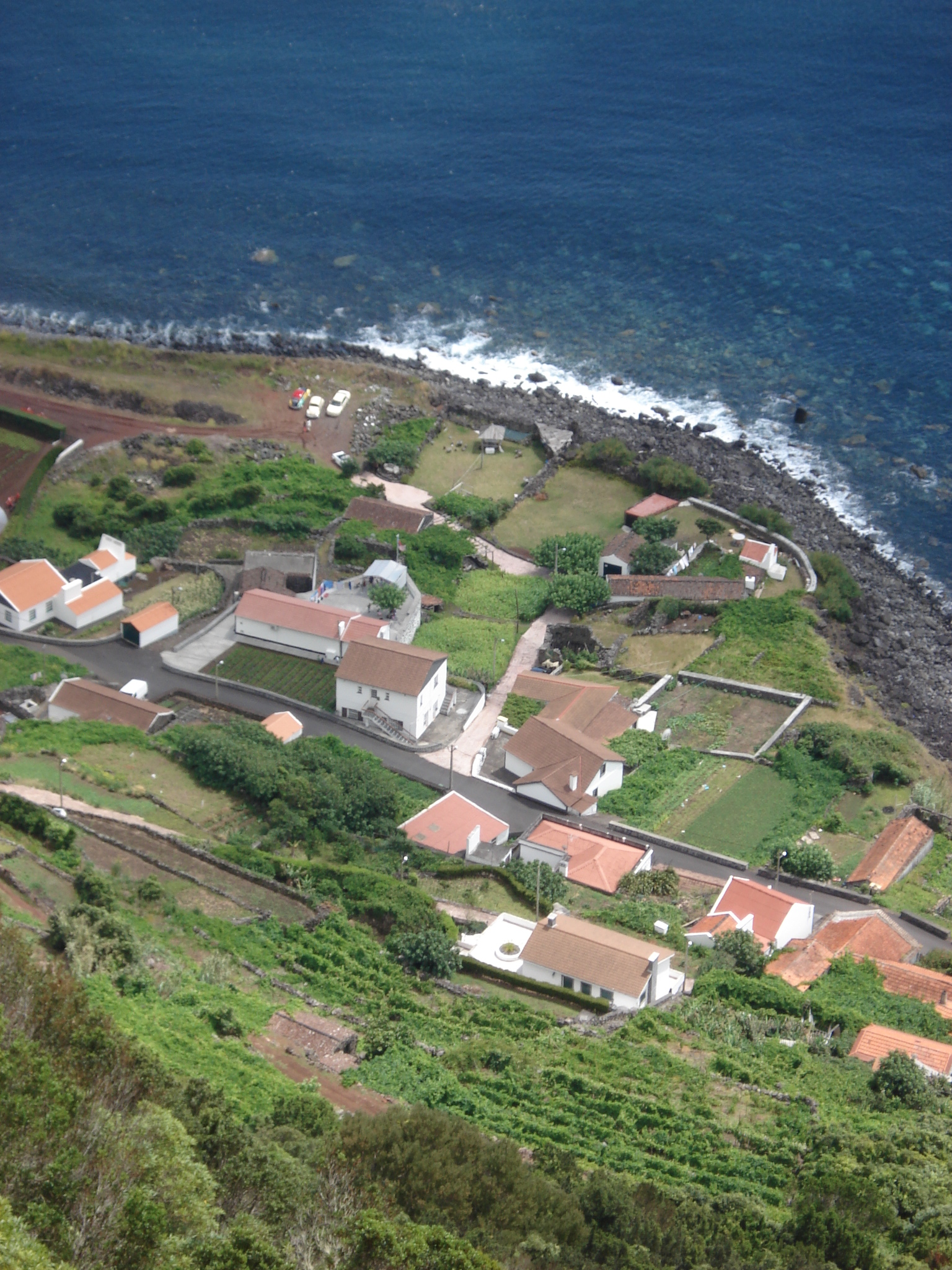
Many of the homes are rehabilitated and occupied year round

In November 1661, the municipality of Calheta ordered the hunting of rodents and birds in this region; each farmer was required to provide 20 rabbit pelts, 30 rat pelts and 30 birds. This was referred to, at the time, as the O Imposto para a Salvação do Trigo (A Tax for the Salvation of Wheat), and required each farmer to own a dog and ferret, in order to keep their lands clear of these nuisance animals.

At a time when the hermitage of São Sebastião was the seat of the parish, there was a resident clergy supporting a population of 500 local inhabitants and other fajãs. Since this period, the chapel was abandoned and the region integrated into the parish of Ribeira Seca.

The 1757 earthquake (which was assumed to be a magnitude 7.4 on the Richter Scale) was responsible for destroying the original settlement, resulting in the deaths of 1034 people across the island. Of these, 128 people were discovered near the churchyard in the fajã, including the vicar and members of the local clergy. The earthquake caused several landslides, rockfalls and movements of land that resulted in the creation of several new fajãs around the island, such as in Fajã da Ponta Nova. As a consequence of these events, King Joseph ordered, by royal decree, that the rents paid to Terceirense landowners be abrogated.

There are three fountains that date to 1882 and 1883, while the third (alongside the church) that is undated.

The fajã was one of the unique places to have a school established, inaugurated on 12 April 1886, and who by 1993 still maintained a small class of 11 students.

The port of the fajã suffered great destruction following the 3 February 1899 earthquake, which affected the southern coast of São Jorge.

A 1992 tropical storm, Hurricane Bonnie, resulted in excess rainfall in the lands over the fajã, resulting in the destruction of the main bridge.

== Geography ==
The fajã is occupied by a small population of about 70 residents throughout the year.

The waters of Ribeira dos Vimes, Ribeira do Capadinho and Grota do Moledo (sometime Grotão do Moledo), in the area referred to as Tabuleiro, are responsible for supporting five historic watermills, all in bad states of conservation.

Fishing was an important part of the local economy and part of the subsistence lifestyle that permeated the early location. Its fertile soils, supported by a warm microclimate, allowed the cultivation of corn, rye, grapes, potato, beans and taro (with the latter two being the predominant cultures), while a low-volume coffee culture also developed.

== Culture ==
This fajã is recognized for the quilts and artesanal textiles produced in the community, since it uses the ancient techniques that includes ancient wooden looms.

The historic Chapel of São Sebastião was established by Lay Carmelites, and the feast day (16 July) continues to be celebrated in the fajã. Another festival that is very popular is the feast day of the Corpo de Deus, when many Jorgenses and visitors travel to the fajã, and eat fried fish, limpets, taro and potato accompanied with wine.

== See also ==
- List of fajãs in the Azores
