= Fajã Amaro da Cunha =

Cliff debris field in Velas, São Jorge, Portuguese Azores

- Interactive map of Fajã Amaro da Cunha
- Location: Rosais, São Jorge, Central, Azores, Portugal
- Coordinates: 38°44′19″N 28°15′1″W
- Named for: Amaro da Cunha
- Visitors: Accessible by foot, yet restricted during periods of inclement weather
- Geographic detail from Portuguese Army map

The Fajã Amaro da Cunha is a permanent debris field, built from the collapsing cliffs on the northern coast of the civil parish of Rosais, in the municipality of Velas, island of São Jorge, in the Portuguese archipelago of the Azores.

The small fajã is situated along the northern coast of the island, and is a narrow field of geomorphological deposits, sloping along the margins of the coast. It is inhabited for short periods of time during the year, when the fertile land is cultivated by local farmers. Located near the Fajã da Ermida, there is no permanent human settlement on the fajã.

== See also ==
- List of fajãs in the Azores
