= Fajã de Além =

- Fajã
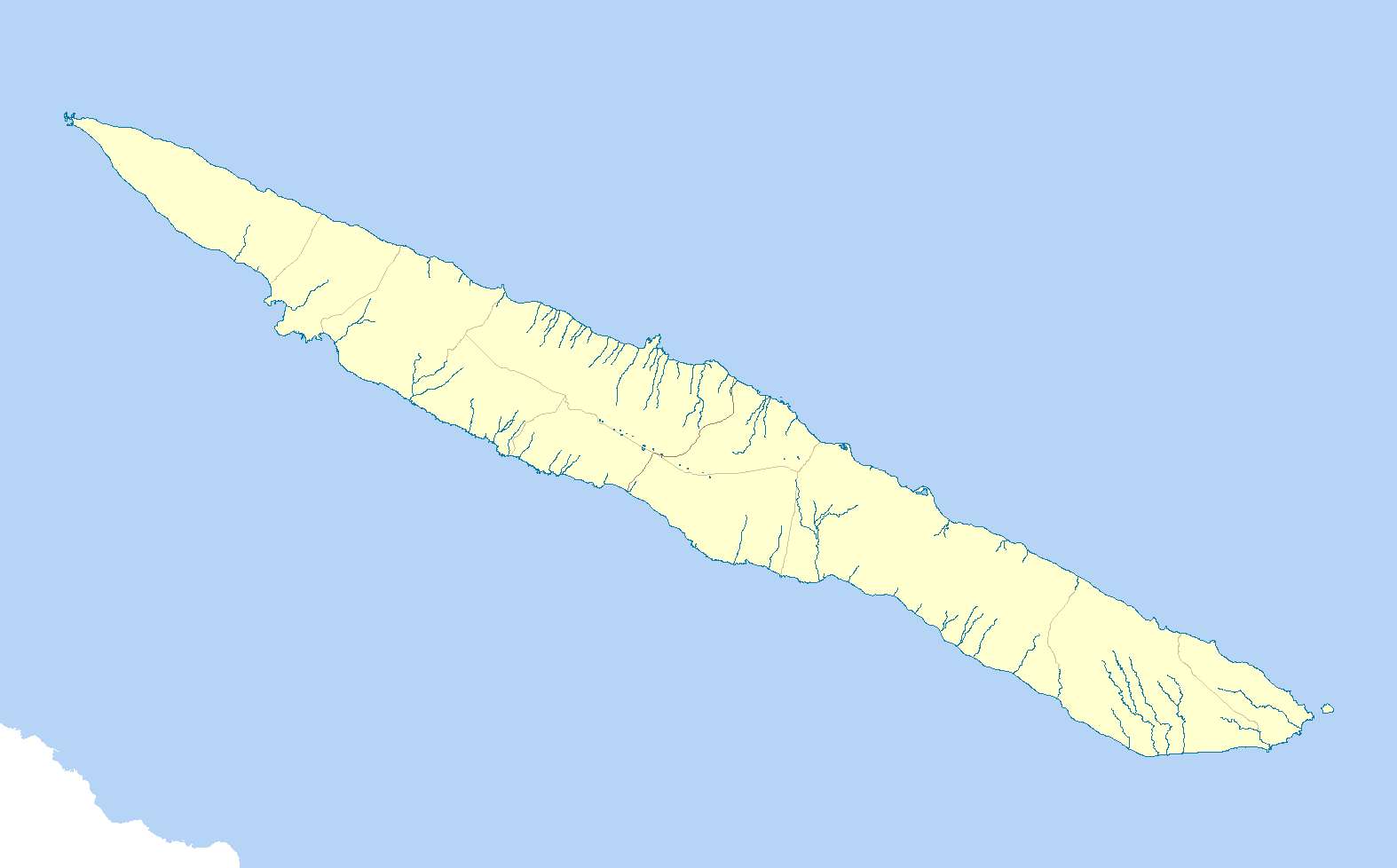
- Coordinates: 38°40′44″N 28°4′27″W
- Location: Norte Grande, Velas, São Jorge Island
- Access: Accessible by foot, yet restricted during periods of unfavourable weather

The Fajã de Além is a permanent debris field, known as a fajã, built from the collapsing cliffs on the northern coast of the civil parish of Norte Grande, in the municipality of Velas, island of São Jorge, in the Portuguese archipelago of the Azores.

== Geography ==
The fajã is situated between Fajã da Ponta Nova and Fajã da Fajanzinha at the mouth of the Ribeira das Queijadas, and can be reached by the E.R.1-2ª regional roadway, between the villages of Santo António and Norte Grande. It is not completely accessible by vehicles, but reachable by a trail beginning in Ermida (Santo António), that extends to the cliff. The trails then continues along a long, accented winding route down the escarpment, through stone staircases, to the isolated shoreline.

Normally abandoned throughout the year, the residents of the Fajã d'Além normally return to the fajã in the summer months, resulting in a population of about 40 people. During three months out of the year, is difficult to observe the Sun, owing to the very steep slopes of the escarpment.

== See also ==
- List of fajãs in the Azores
