= Fajã da Maria Pereira =

- Fajã
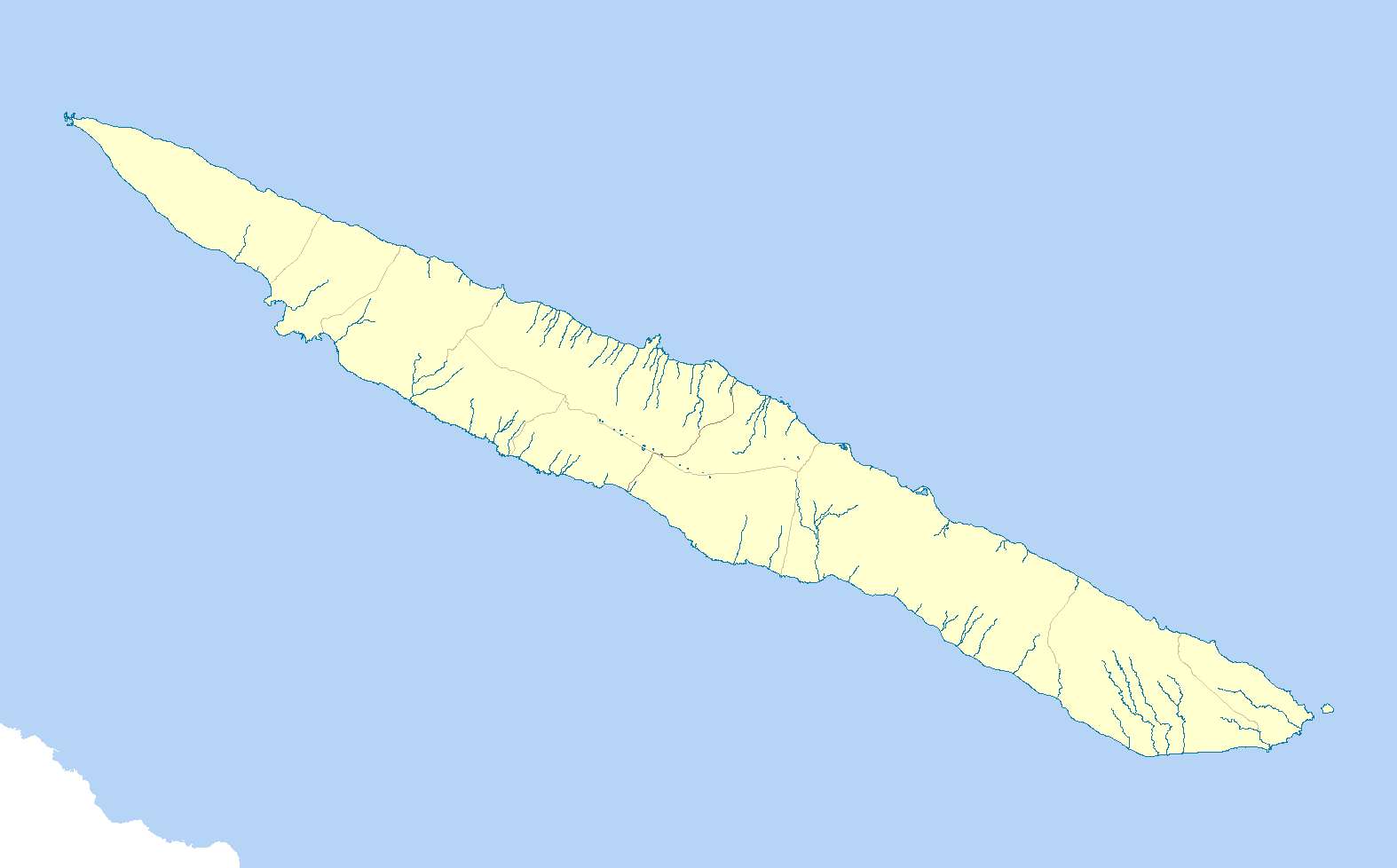
- Location within São Jorge
- Coordinates: 38°44′8″N 28°14′38″W
- Location: Rosais, São Jorge Island
- Access: Accessible by foot, yet restricted during periods of unfavourable weather

The Fajã da Maria Pereira is a permanent debris field, built from the collapsing cliffs on the northern coast of the civil parish of Rosais, in the municipality of Velas, island of São Jorge, in the Portuguese archipelago of the Azores.

Name after a former property-owner, the fertile lands of this microclimate are today used to support grazing animals and the cultivation of potatoes and other vegetables, in addition to vineyards (primarily during the growing season). Six homes occupy the fajã, supported by a system of cisterns providing potable water, necessary for a local consumption.

== See also ==
- List of fajãs in the Azores
