= Fajã de Entre Poios =

Debris field on the Azores

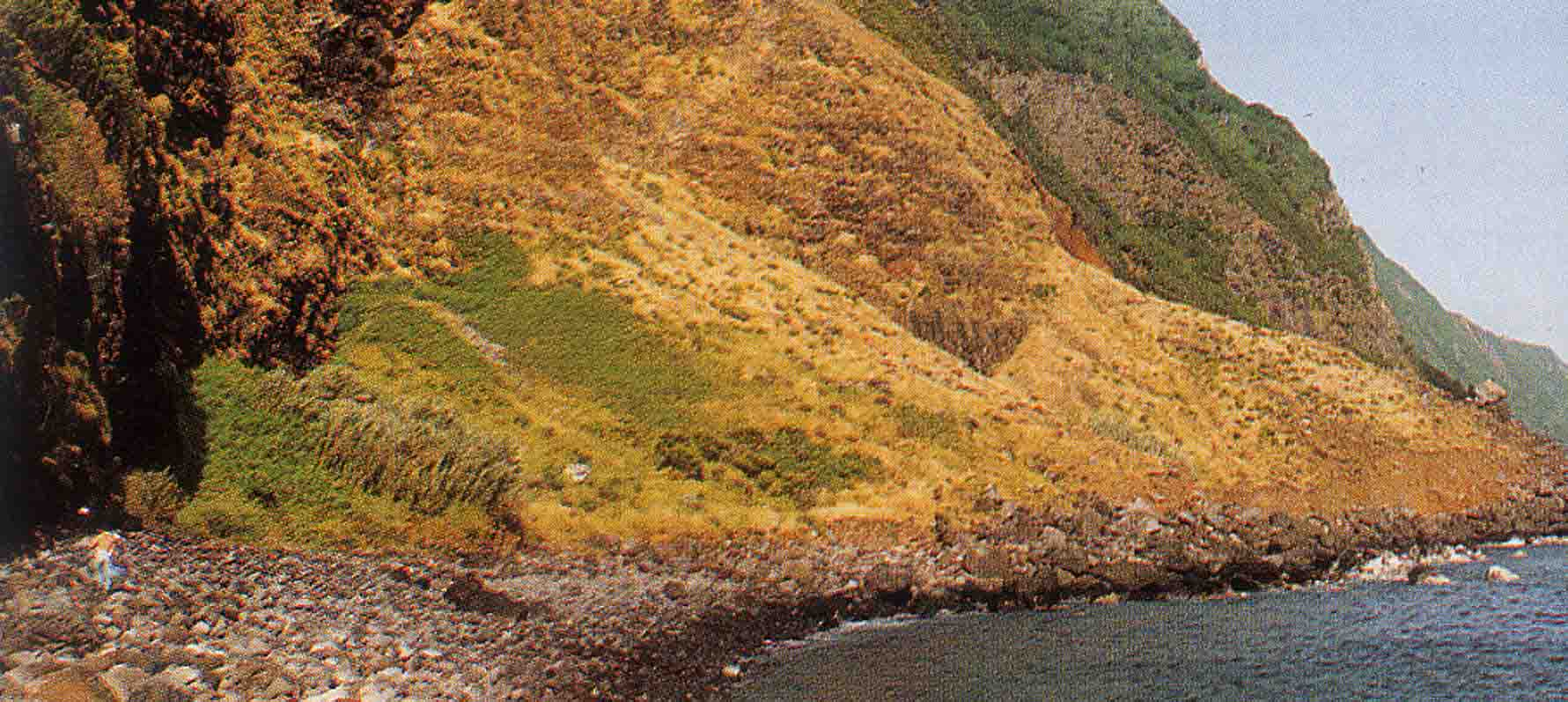
- The abandoned debris field of Entre Poios, which is becoming a refuge for marine birds
- Interactive map of Fajã de Entre Poios
- Location: Velas, São Jorge, Central, Azores, Portugal
- Coordinates: 38°43′7″N 28°11′40″W
- Named for: Portuguese for Between Hills/Knolls
- Visitors: Accessible by foot, yet restricted during periods of inclimate weather
- Geographic detail from Portuguese Army map

The Fajã of Entre Poios (Portuguese: Fajã de Entre Poios), literally meaning the Fajã between Hills/Knolls is a permanent debris field, built from the collapsing cliffs on the northern coast of the civil parish of Velas, in the municipality of Velas, island of São Jorge, in the Portuguese archipelago of the Azores.

There were several families from this district with their own woodlots at Entre Poios, where they would collect wood for their ovens. This fajã served the purpose of raising wild goats and for the collection of timber, which was transported uphill to the community of Beira (in the centre of the island).

There are three small ravines, one of which is a permanent course, that cross the fajã.

== See also ==
- List of fajãs in the Azores
