= Fajã de João Dias =

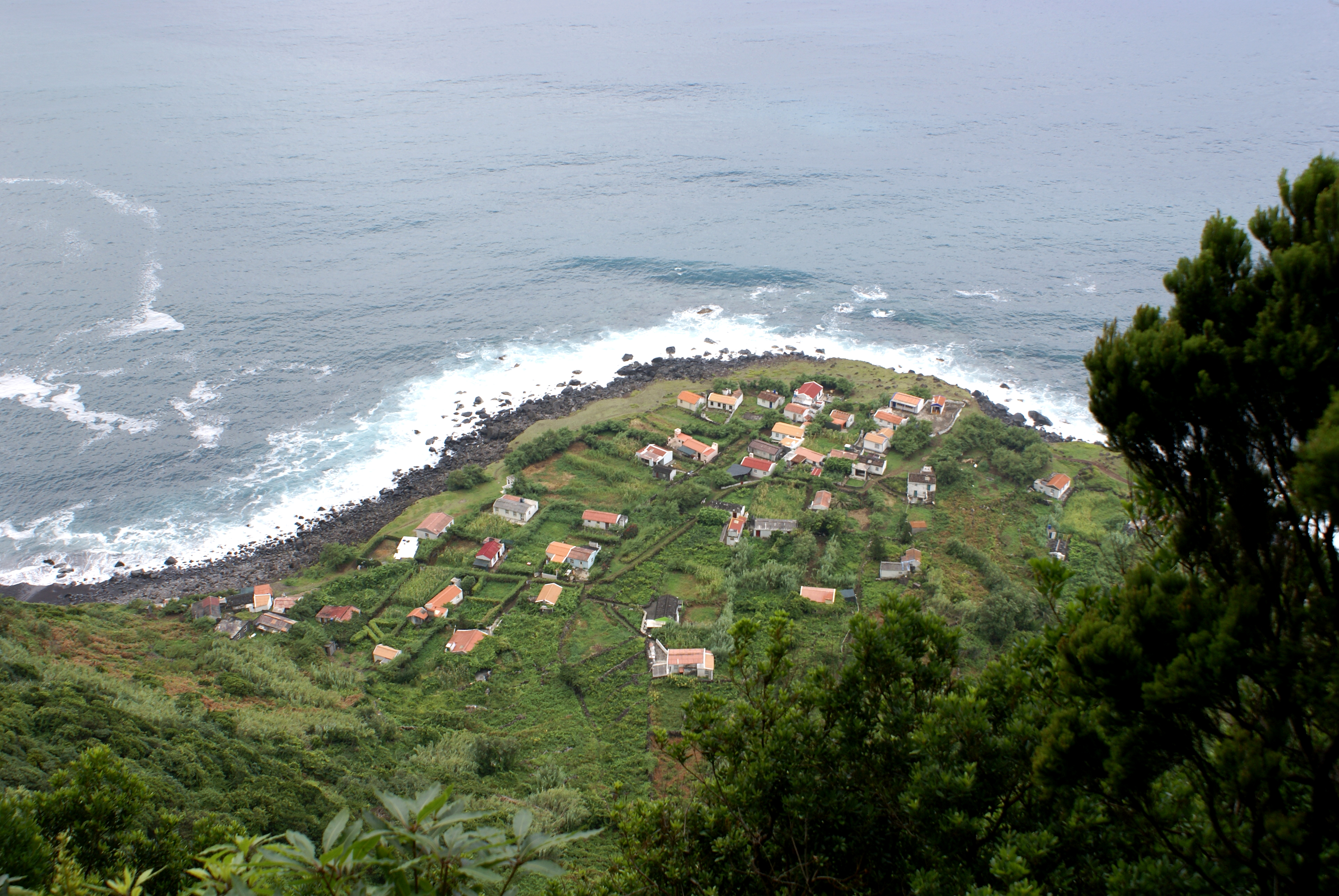
- A view down to the seasonally-populated fajã Jorge Dias
- Interactive map of Fajã de João Dias
- Location: Rosais, São Jorge, Central, Azores, Portugal
- Coordinates: 38°43′49″N 28°13′41″W
- Named for: João Dias (Note: The original landowner whose property included part of the fajã.)
- Visitors: Accessible by foot, yet restricted during periods of inclimate weather
- Geographic detail from Portuguese Army map

The Fajã de João Dias is a permanent debris field, built from the collapsing cliffs on the northern coast of the civil parish of Rosais, in the municipality of Velas, island of São Jorge, in the Portuguese archipelago of the Azores.

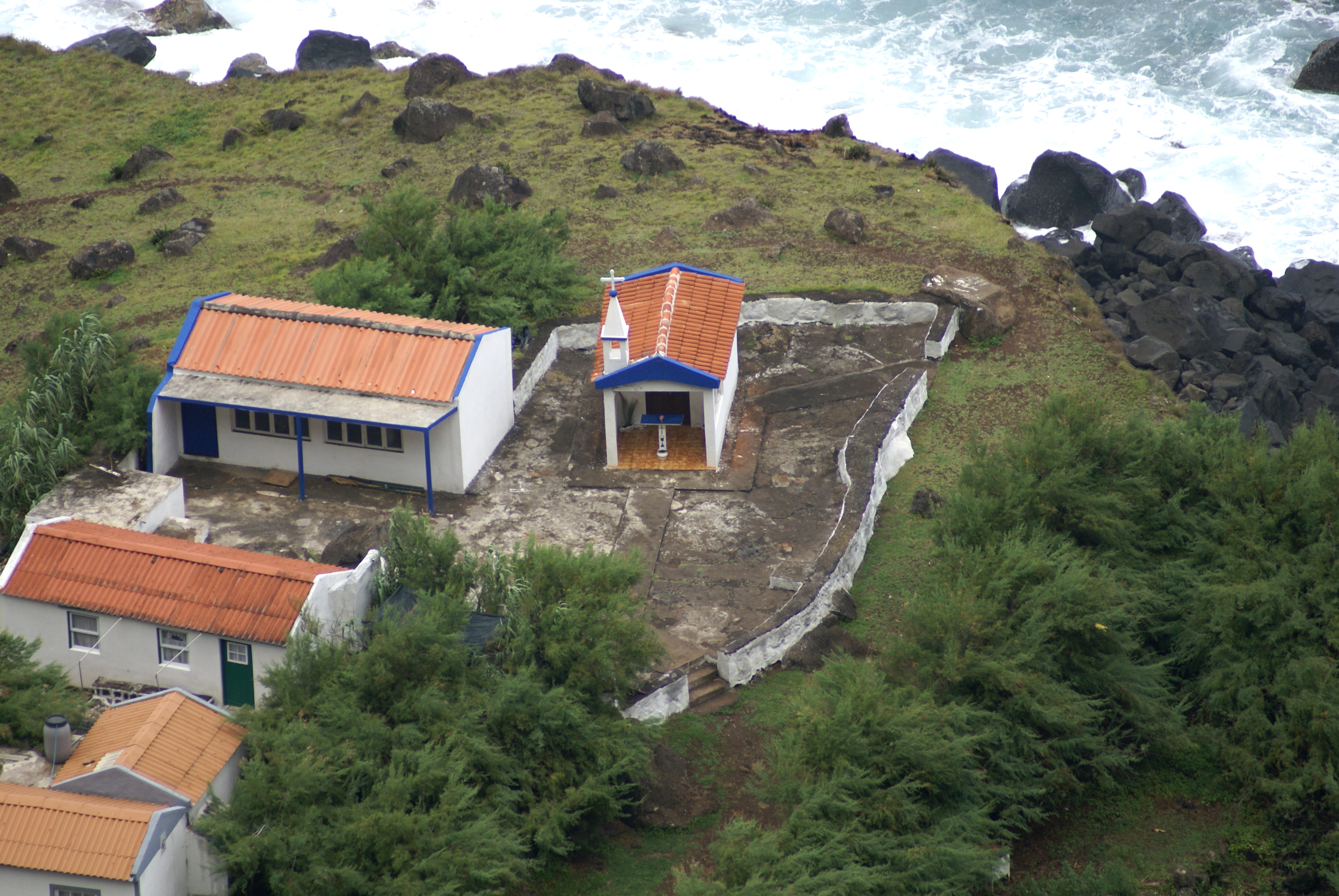
The small hermitage of São João Evangelista

Apart from a chapel, the settlement includes 17 older houses and over thirty remodelled or modern homes. Much of the settlement was destroyed following the 1980 earthquake, with only one home remaining habitable year-round. The remainder of the buildings became weekend retreats and for those with plots of land used to cultivate figs, vines and corn; these residents living elsewhere on the island. Owing to the area's microclimate, fruits are also common along the fajãs or surrounding terraces. There are no commercial buildings.

The settlement is inaccessible by vehicle or along the coast, but a paved road down the cliff was under construction in the east, by 2009. This trail is accessible by foot or pack animal, and snakes down the 450 metres (1,480 ft) cliff.

At the base is a rocky beach with a pair of private boats. Freshwater is supplied from springs along the cliff, while most houses have cisterns to collect water in the settlement.

== See also ==
- List of fajãs in the Azores
