= Norte Pequeno =

- Civil parish
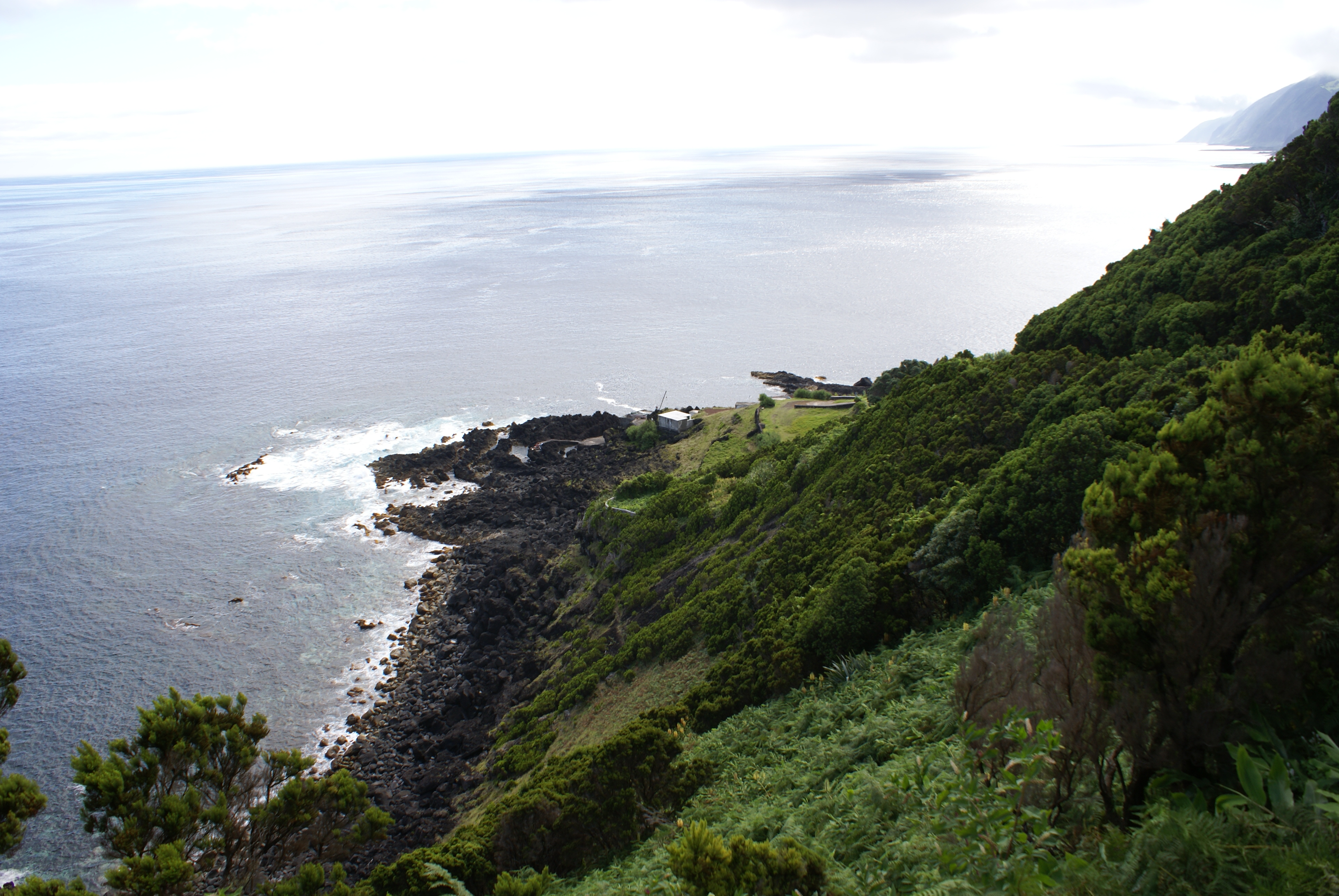
- Fajã da Ponta Grossa, on the north coast of Norte Pequeno, Calheta

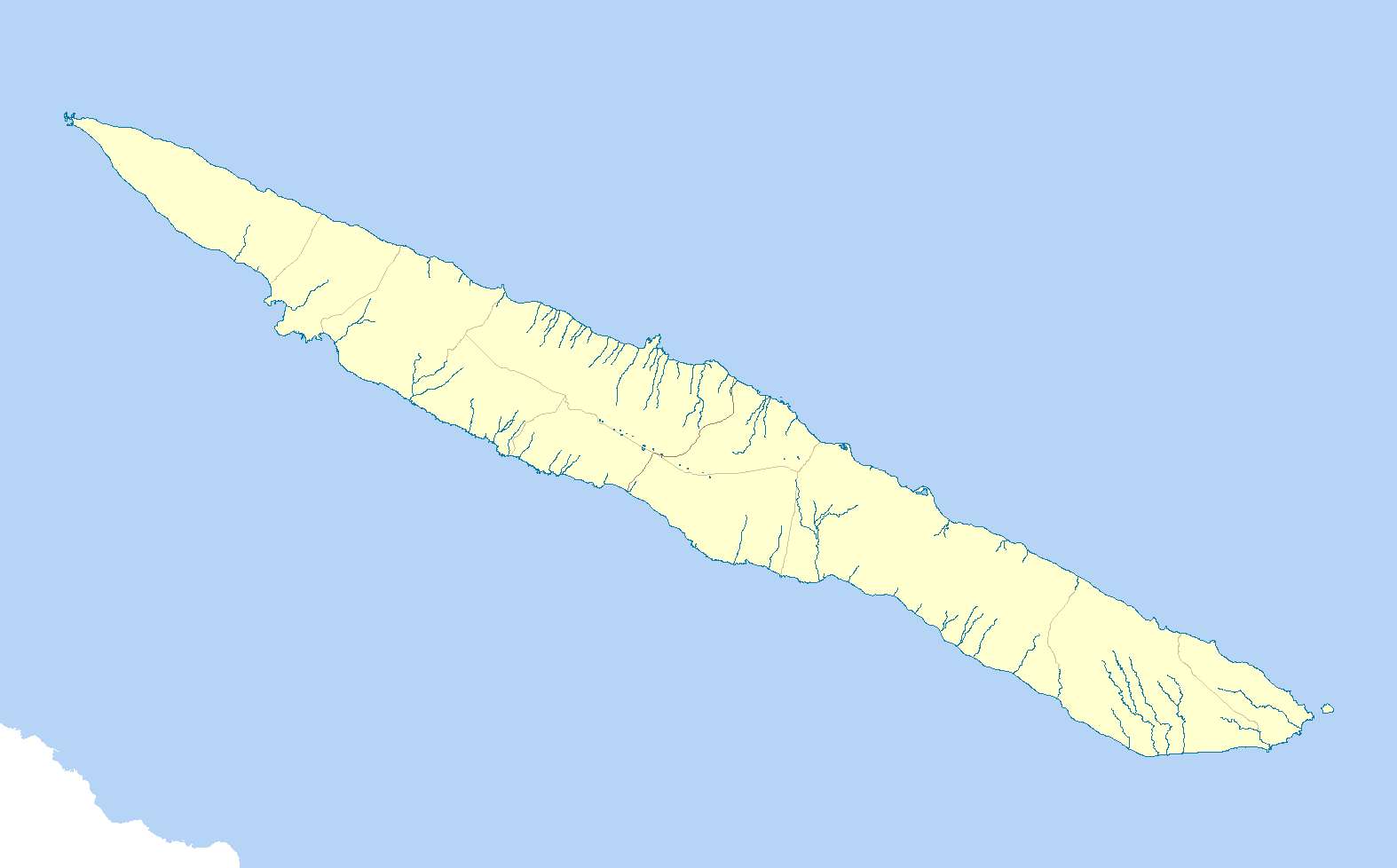
- Location in the Azores Norte Pequeno (São Jorge)
- Coordinates: 38°38′55″N 28°0′4″W
- Country: Portugal
- Auton. region: Azores
- Island: São Jorge
- Municipality: Calheta
- Established: Settlement: c. 1690

Area
  - Total: 12.11 km^{2} (4.68 sq mi)
- Elevation: 453 m (1,486 ft)

Population (2011)
  - Total: 220
  - Density: 18/km^{2} (47/sq mi)
- Time zone: UTC−01:00 (AZOT)
  - Summer (DST): UTC+00:00 (AZOST)
- Postal code: 9850-000
- Area code: 292
- Patron: São Lázaro

Norte Pequeno is a freguesia ("civil parish") in the municipality of Calheta in the Portuguese Azores, located on the northern coast of the island of São Jorge. The population in 2011 was 220, in an area of 12.11 km^{2}. It contains the localities Canada do Ponte and Norte Pequeno.

== History ==
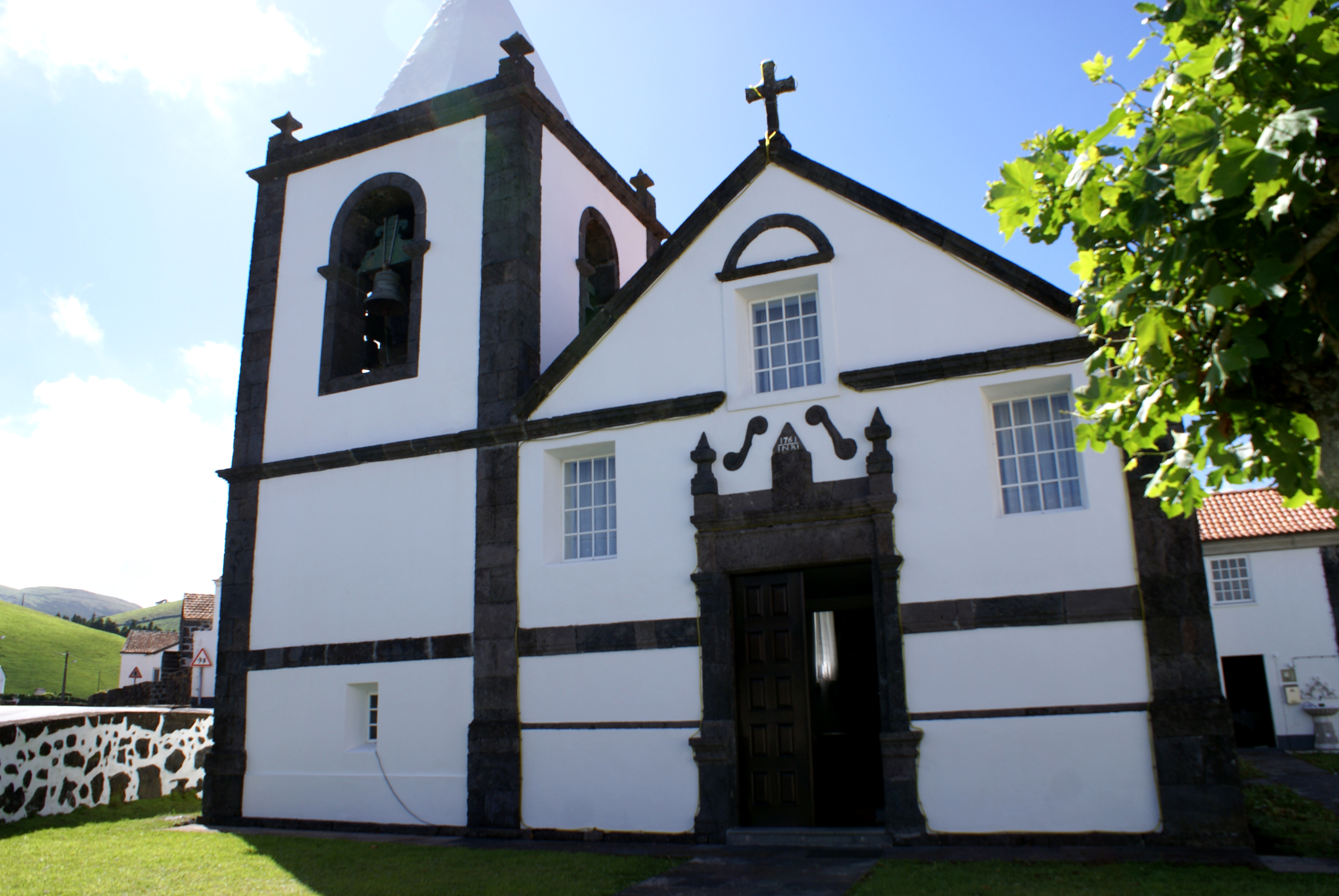
Front façade of the church of São Lázare, Norte Pequeno

This settlement was originally formed by peoples from the village of Calheta, around 1690; this is conjecture, based on the construction of the village chapel, which was built to evoke São Lázaro. This chapel became the base for the current parochial Church of São Lázaro, which grew and was emancipated from the church in Calheta around 1758. The original church was destroyed in the 1757 earthquake, which was responsible for the destruction and deaths in most of the eastern part of the island. The current church was constructed through the initiative of Father Nicolau António and completed by José d’Avellar de Mello in 1761.

== Geography ==
Norte Pequeno, straddles both the central plain and coastal area, which is dotted with fajãs (coastal debris fields) that include: Fajã da Penedia, Fajã das Pontas, Fajã do Mero and Fajã da Neca, which are accessible by foot or pack-animal from the neighboring Fajã dos Cubres, Ribeira Seca. Location of a natural spring, Fajã da Penedia, is one of the less-visited settlements on the island but one of the more historically natural; it has a small chapel constructed in 1890, several small cottages and a recently remodeled communitarian stove, but the fajã has no electricity and telephones. Similar to some of the other fajãs in the north, this area is recognized for generally unspoiled nature and coastal lakes with shrimp and clam beds.

Although a small population, it is still a nucleus of the educational system (having a primary school), as well as many of its own independent infrastructures, including Casa do Povo, Salão Paroquial, Corpo Nacional de Escuteiros (Agrupamento No.223) and a modern factory branch of the Cooperativa Agrícola, where they manufacture cheese. The community is also known for Filarmónica Recreio de São Lázaro (formed in 1981), one of the many philharmonic bands in the region.

== Culture ==
The parish celebrates two important days on the religious calendar: on August 15, the festival in honour of Nossa Senhora do Rosário, and on 17 of December the feast day of São Lázaro, where residents also celebrate the creation of its band.
