= Rosais =

- Civil parish
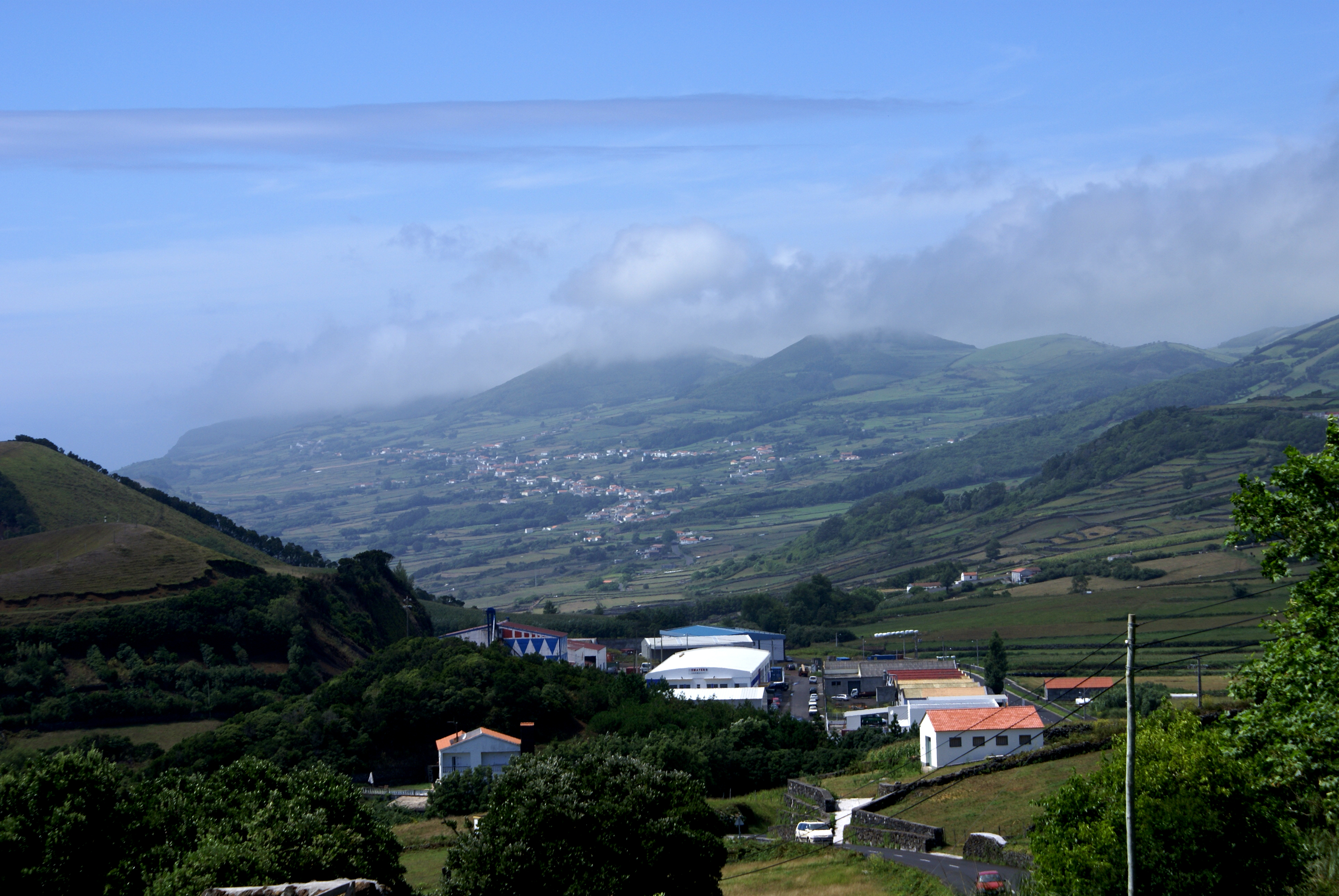
- Interior vista towards the northwestern coast and plateau of Rosais

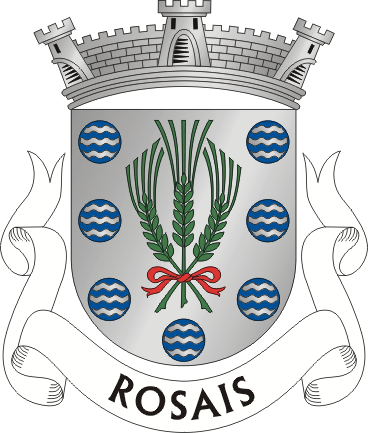
- Coat of arms

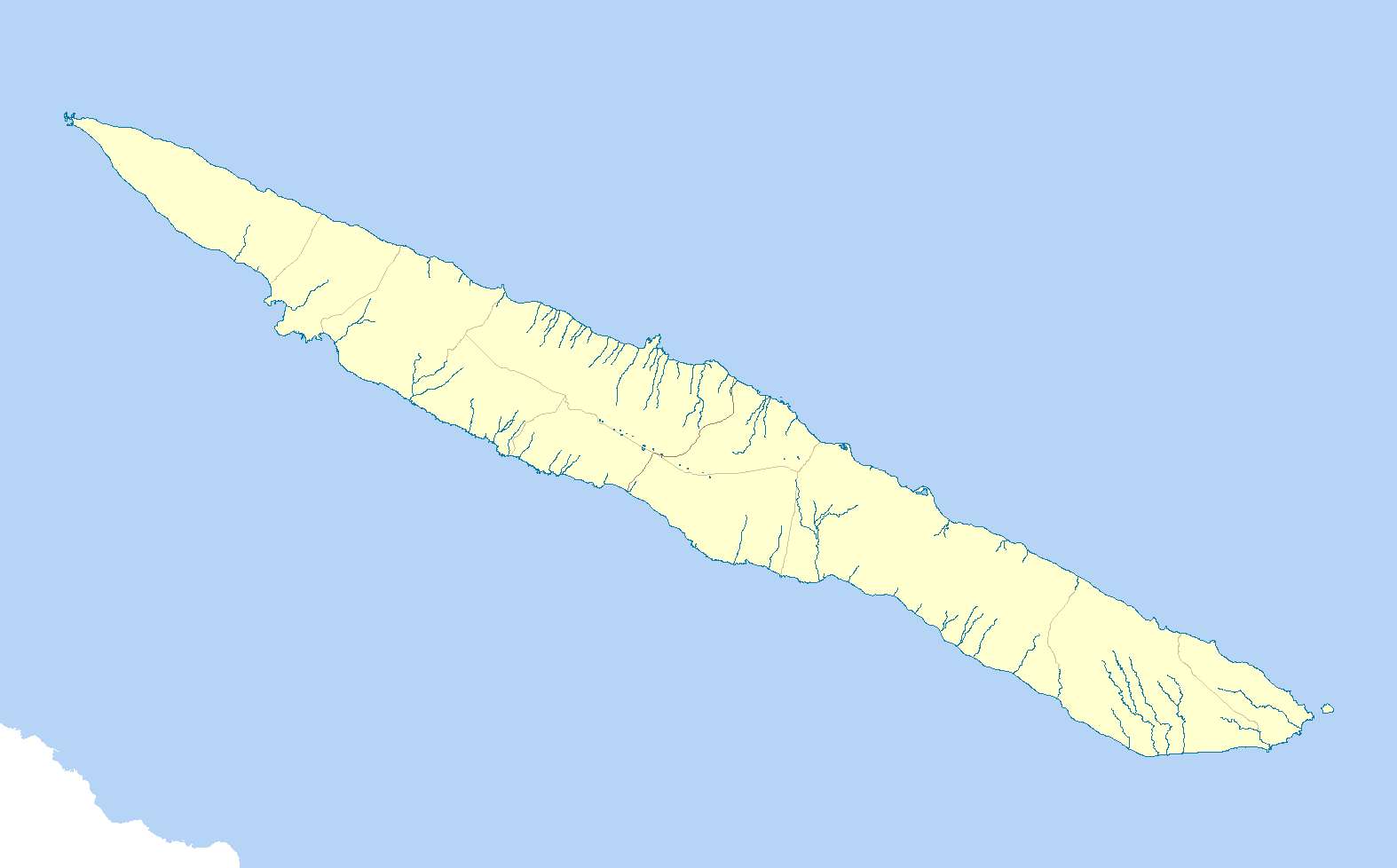
- Location in the Azores Rosais (São Jorge)
- Coordinates: 38°43′3″N 28°15′0″W
- Country: Portugal
- Auton. region: Azores
- Island: São Jorge
- Municipality: Velas
- Established: Settlement: c. 1568

Area
  - Total: 24.23 km^{2} (9.36 sq mi)
- Elevation: 244 m (801 ft)

Population (2011)
  - Total: 743
  - Density: 30.7/km^{2} (79.4/sq mi)
- Time zone: UTC−01:00 (AZOT)
  - Summer (DST): UTC+00:00 (AZOST)
- Postal code: 9800-209
- Area code: 292
- Patron: Nossa Senhora do Rosário

Rosais (literally, archaic Portuguese for "rosaries") is a civil parish in the municipality of Velas in the Portuguese archipelago of the Azores. The population in 2011 was 743, in an area of 24.23 km².

== History ==
Although Rosais was first mentioned in written documents in 1568, it existed as a settlement before then. It was considered the "granary" or "breadbasket" of São Jorge, due to the area's fertility. To this day the area supports rich pastures.

== Geography ==
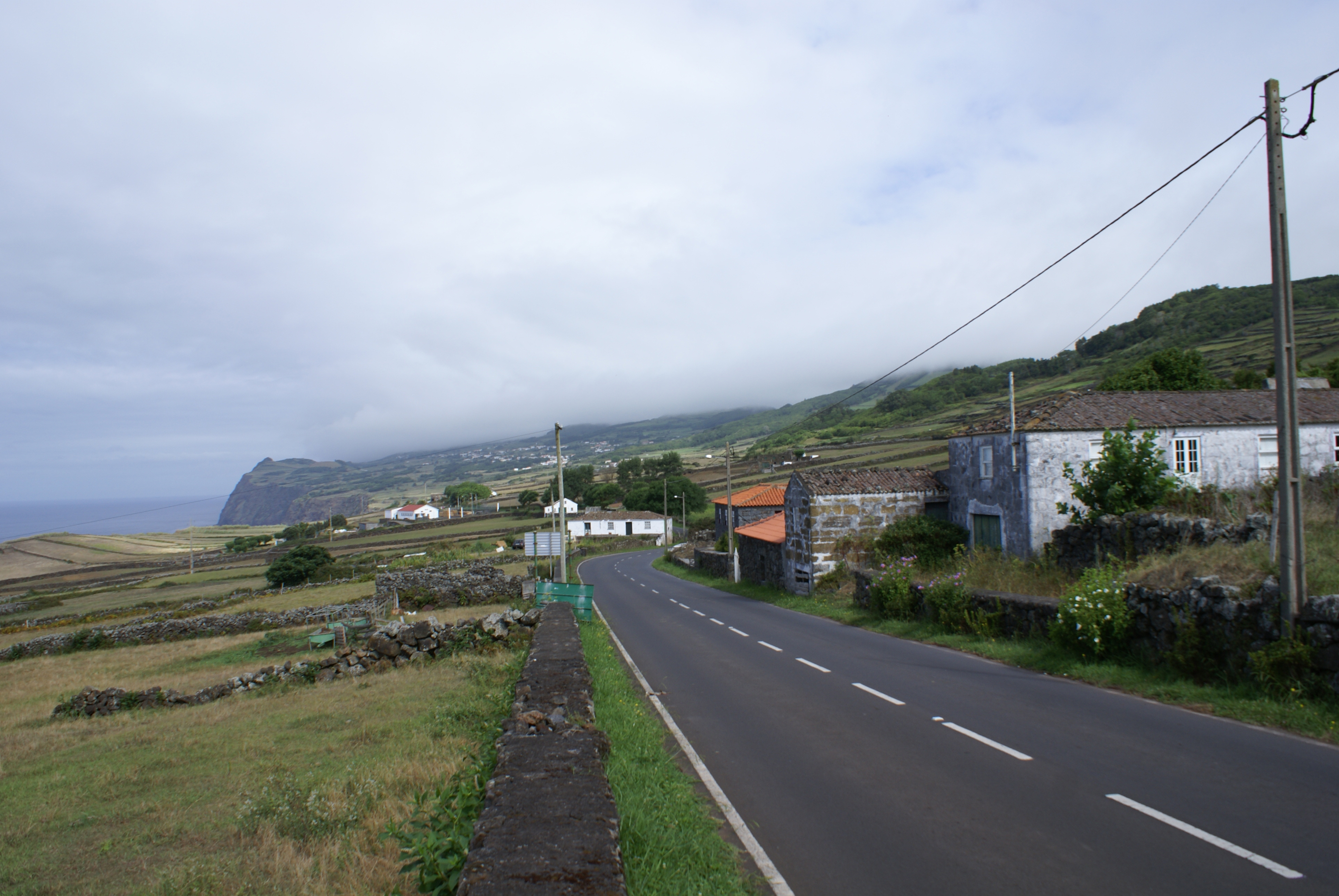
The Estrada Regional (Regional Road) linking Rosais with the southern neighbours of Velas

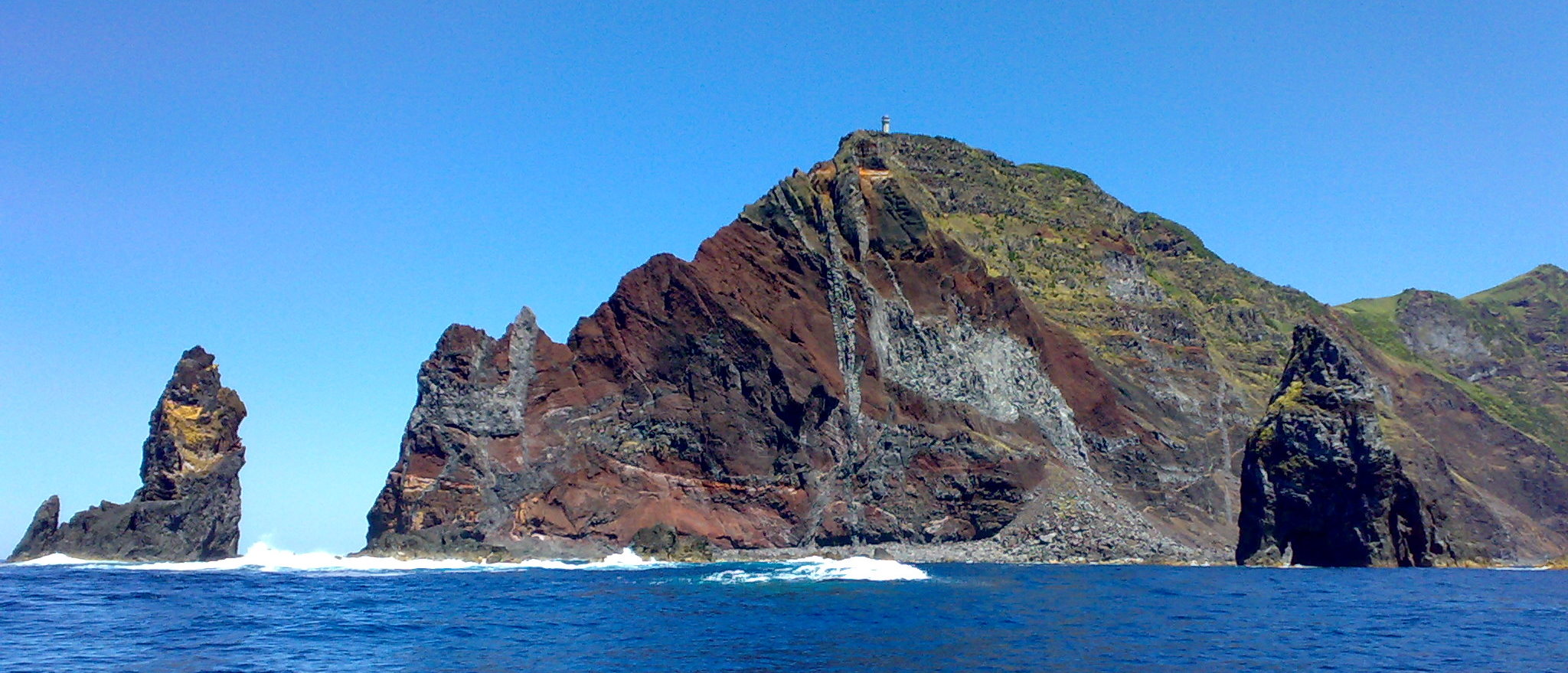
The frontier of the civil parish extends to the northwestern coast of the island of São Jorge, Ponta dos Rosais

The parish of Rosais is located on the island of São Jorge and extends approximately 7 kilometres (4.3 mi) from Figueiras to Ponta dos Rosais. The parish had approximately 820 inhabitants according to the 2001 census. It contains the localities Arrifana, Canada da Trás, Canada das Faias, Fajã de João Dias, Quarteiro, and Rosais.

The western corner of the island is essentially a plateau, with tall cliffs extending until the Ponta dos Rosais, where the Ponta dos Rosais Lighthouse stands as a beacon. The rest of the parish consists mostly of pastures, although it also contains the wooded area Parque Florestal das Sete Fontes (Forest Park of the Seven Springs). Sete Fontes contains green spaces and animal pens and hosts an annual festival honoring the Flemish emigrants who first settled São Jorge and the Azores.

Although many of the cliffs are sheer drops, there are volcanic debris fields along the coast that give rise to São Jorge's fajãs. Of particular note is Fajã de João Dias, a small enclave of buildings where many of the early settlers established homes, located five minutes by foot from the cliff tops.
