= Nossa Senhora do Rosário (disambiguation) =

Nossa Senhora do Rosário, Portuguese for Our Lady of the Rosary, may also refer to the following places:

== Brazil ==
- Nossa Senhora do Rosário, Santa Maria

== Cape Verde ==
- Nossa Senhora do Rosário (Ribeira Grande), a parish in the municipality of Ribeira Grande, Cape Verde

== Portugal ==
- Nossa Senhora do Rosário, a civil parish on the island of São Miguel, Azores, Portugal
- Nossa Senhora do Rosário, also known as Topo, a civil parish on the island of São Jorge, Azores, Portugal

== See also ==
- Church of Nossa Senhora do Rosario, Angola
- Church of Nossa Senhora do Rosário (Calheta)
