= Calheta, Azores =

Calheta
- Municipality
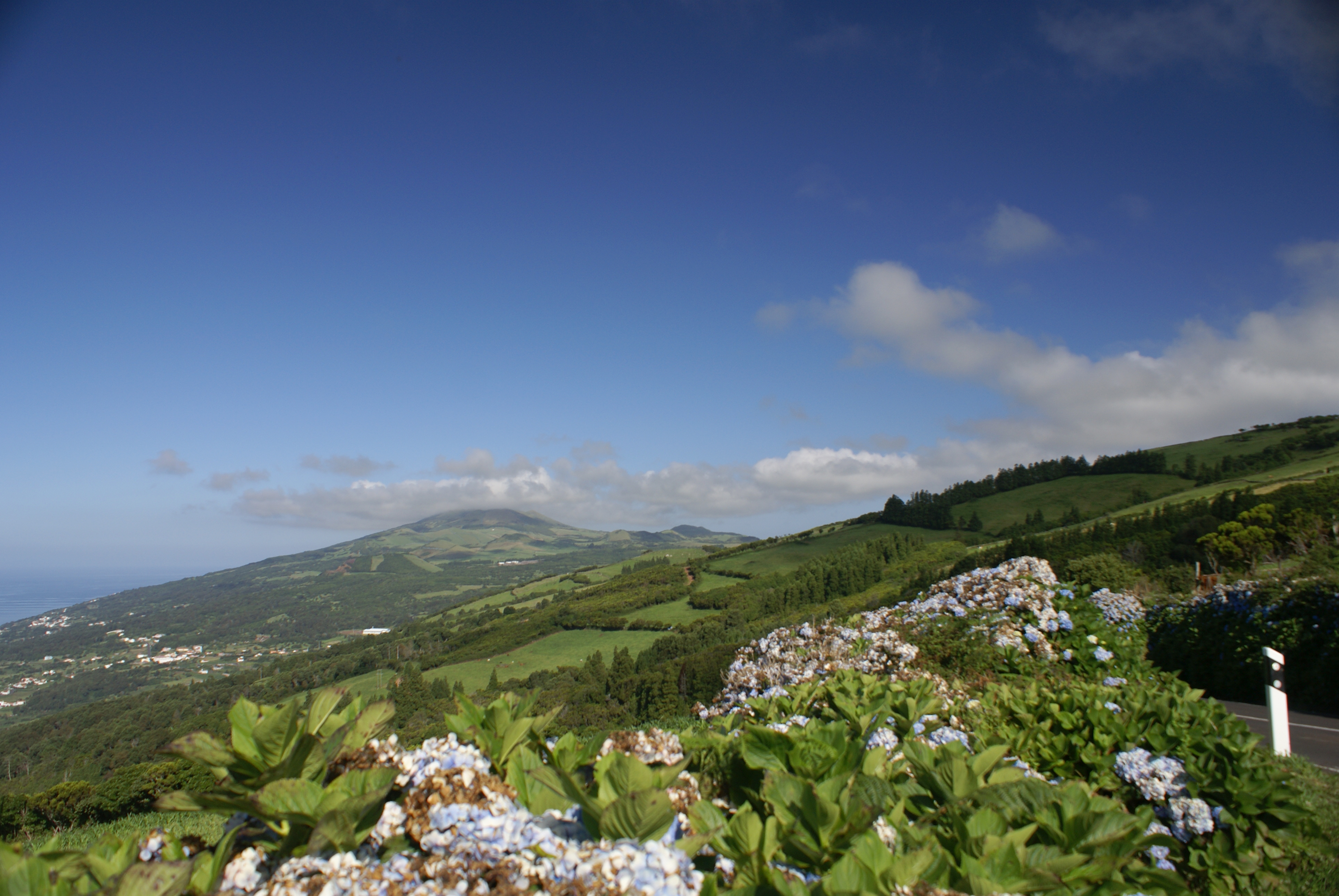
- Interior range of the Volcanic Complex of Topo, dividing the northern and southern parishes of the municipality of Calheta

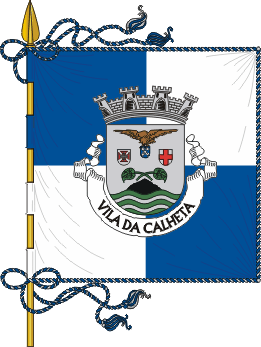
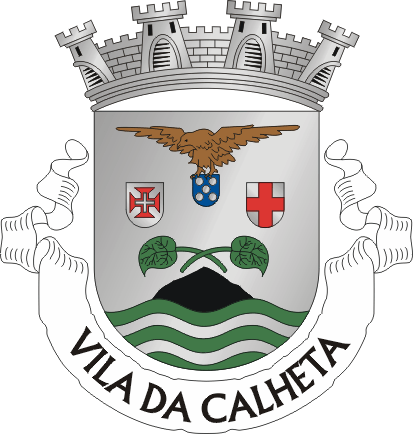
- Flag Coat of arms
- Interactive map of Calheta
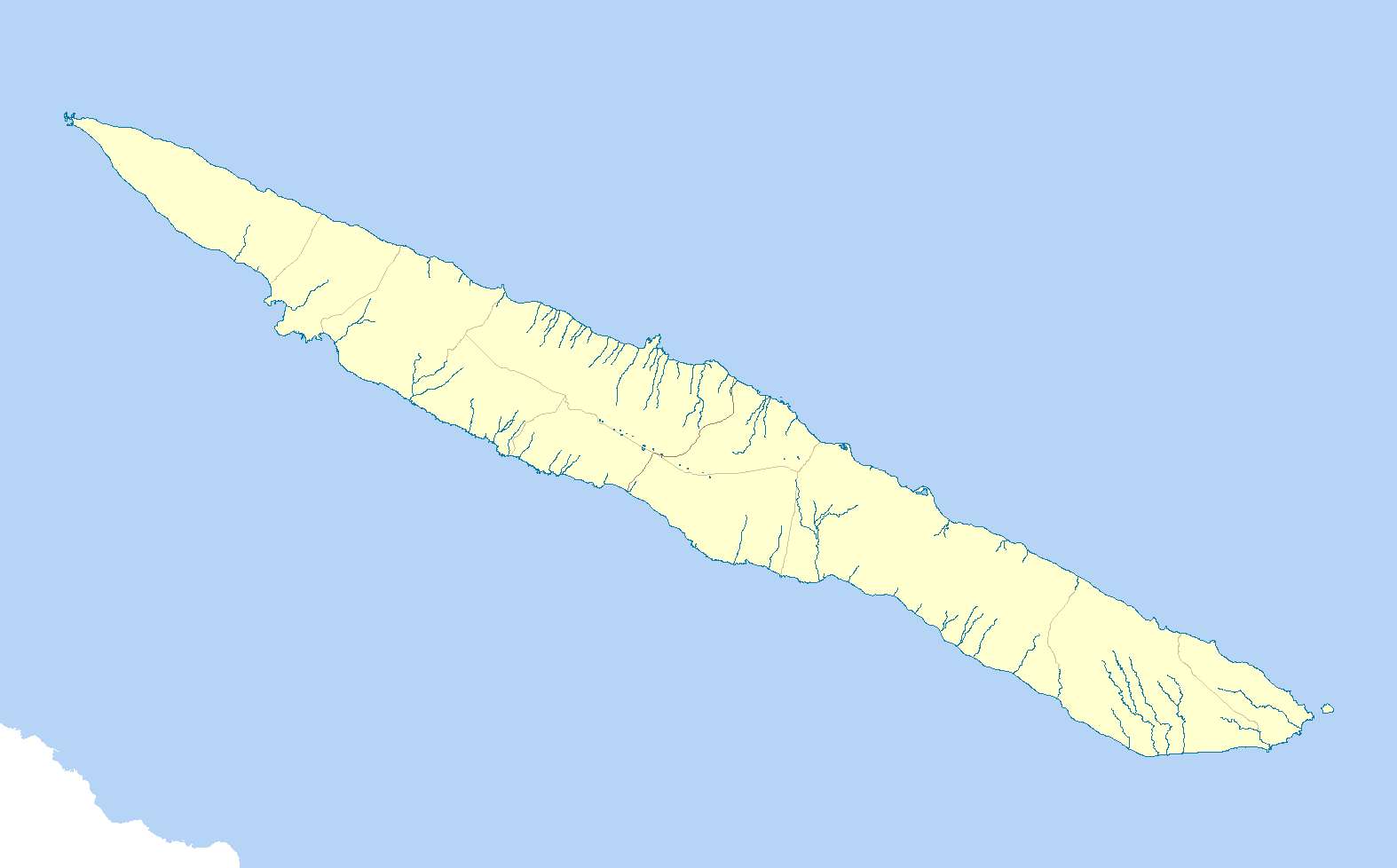
- Location in the Azores Calheta (São Jorge)
- Coordinates: 38°36′5″N 28°0′46″W
- Country: Portugal
- Auton. region: Azores
- Island: São Jorge
- Established: Settlement: c. 1483; Municipality: c. 1534
- Parishes: 5

Government
  - President: Duarte Manuel de Bettencourt da Silveira

Area
  - Total: 126.26 km^{2} (48.75 sq mi)
- Elevation: 22 m (72 ft)

Population (2011)
  - Total: 3,773
  - Density: 29.88/km^{2} (77.40/sq mi)
- Time zone: UTC−01:00 (AZOT)
  - Summer (DST): UTC+00:00 (AZOST)
- Postal code: 9850-032
- Area code: 292
- Patron: Santa Catarina de Alexandria
- Local holiday: 25 November
- Website: www.cm-calheta.pt

Calheta (Portuguese pronunciation: [kɐˈʎetɐ]) is a municipality on the island of São Jorge, in the Portuguese autonomous region of Azores. The municipality includes the eastern portion of the island of São Jorge and borders the municipality of Velas. The population in 2011 was 3,773, in an area of 126.26 km^{2}.

== History ==
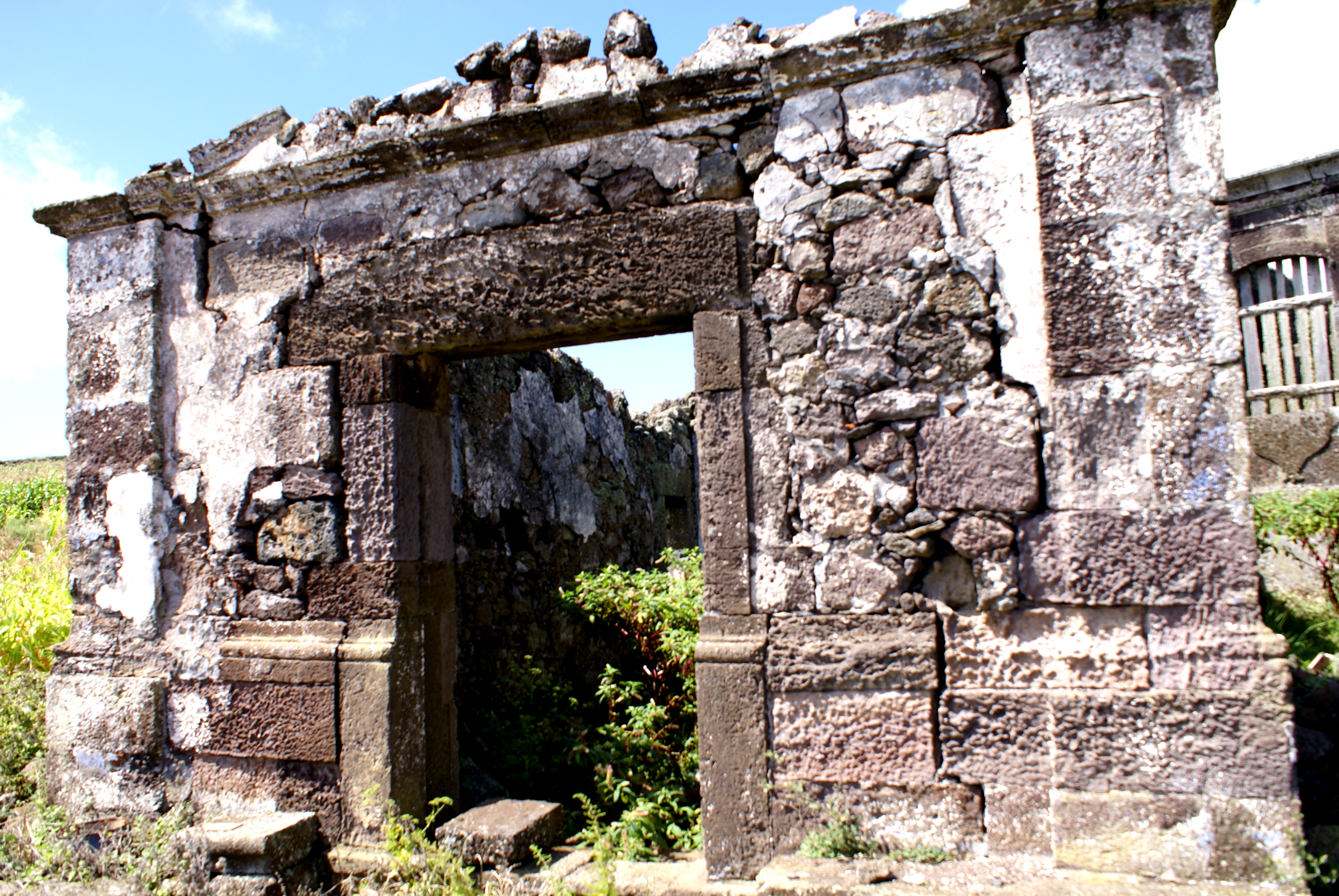
The ruins of the chapel annex of the manorhouse of the Tiagos

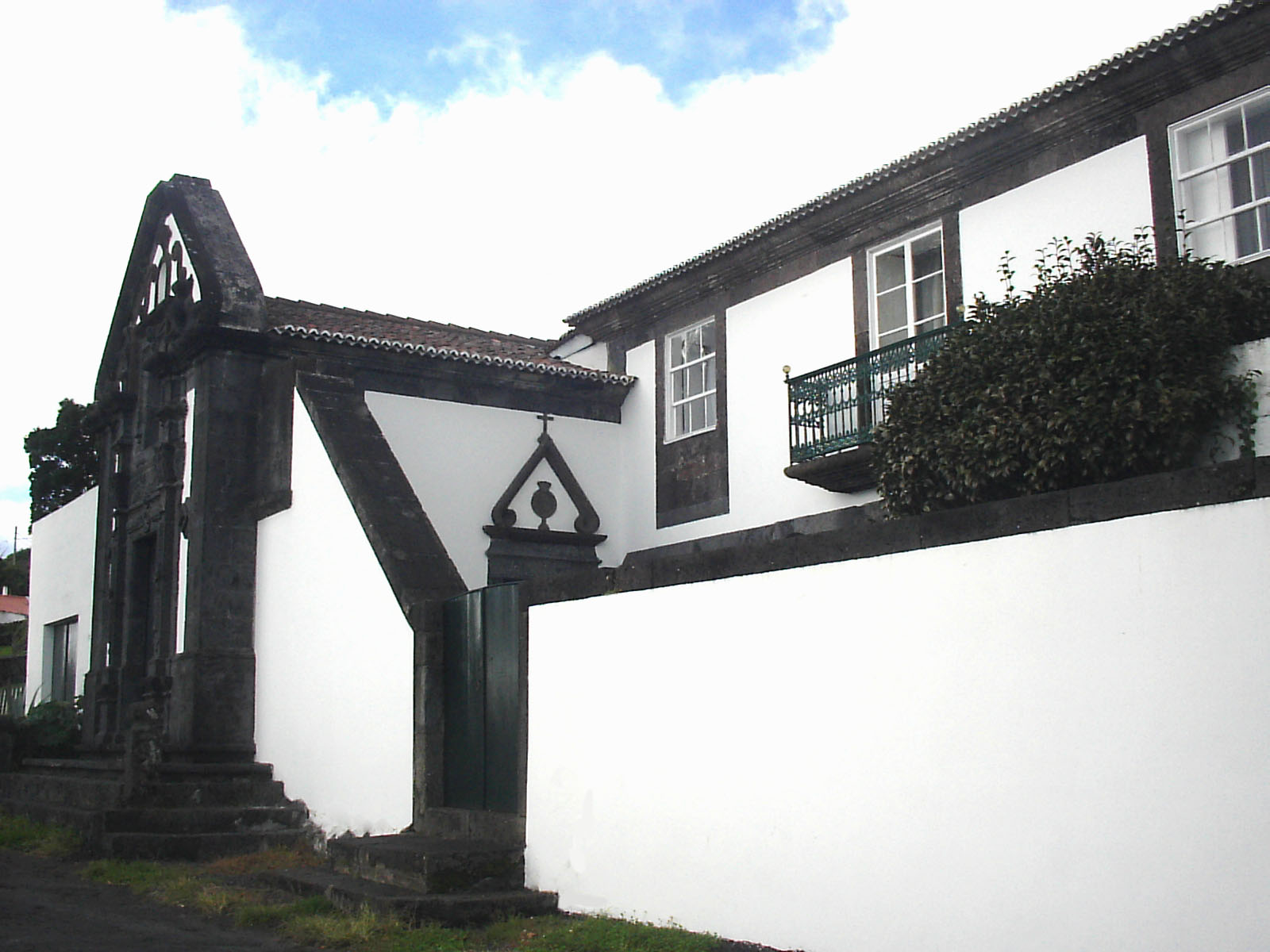
The imposing Noronha family manorhouse associated with landed gentry in the Household of Queen Catherine

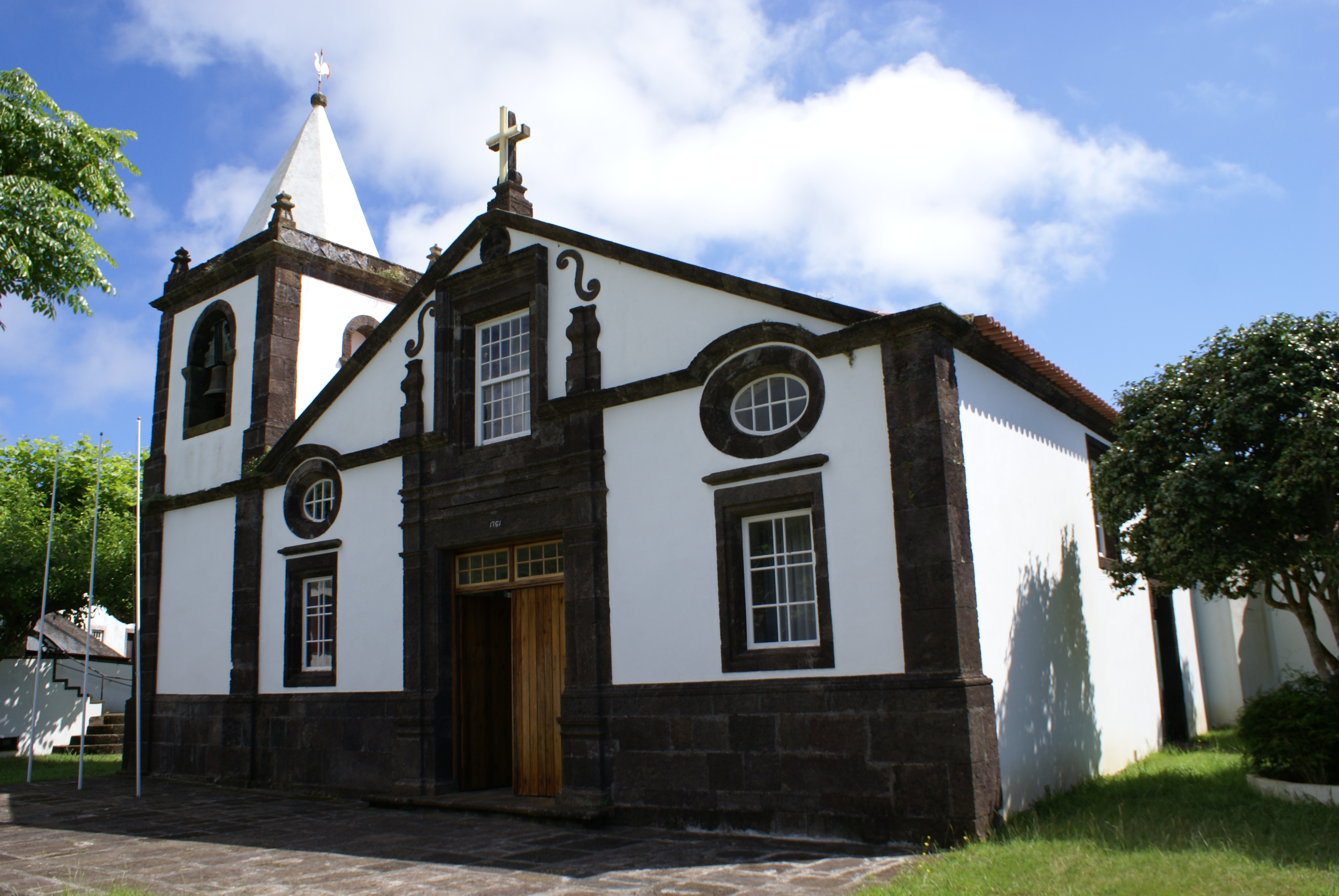
The rebuilt Church of Nossa Senhora do Rosário following the Mandada do Deus earthquake

The first reference to São Jorge was in 1439, but it wasn't until 1470, when colonial nuclei dotted the southern and western coast: the first of these colonists were believed to have come from northern Europe. The municipality of Calheta, whose first settlers arrived around the 1480s (principally in the area of Topo, but later into the sheltered coves and fajãs) along the southern coast of the island). The island of São Jorge was ceded to João Vaz Corte-Real on 4 May 1483, becoming the first Captain-Donatario, thus initiating the primary settlement of the island. This phase of development is notable for the settlement of Willem van der Haegen, a Flemish pioneer of Azorean colonization who traveled and settled in Faial, Corvo and Terceira). His final resting place was in the settlement of Topo, which he founded with other Flemish settlers; he died in 1500, and was buried in the chapel-annex to the Solar dos Tiagos. Topo was later elevated to municipality and its village the municipal seat, on 12 September 1510.

Calheta was elevated to the status of town on 3 June 1534 by regal decree, issued by King D. John III.

Meanwhile, other settlements developed rapidly due to a number of sheltered anchorages and the fertility of the small fajãs where colonists established homes. Fajã de São João, one of this settlements along the southern coast, had settlers as early as 1550 (this is conjecture established from the Chapel of São João. In Topo, the community established a port in order to establish trade with Terceira (at that time the largest municipal and commercial center in the Azores). Other settlements radiated from the coastal beachheads and the growth of the number of colonists justified the de-annexation of the parish of Calheta from the municipality of Velas. Demonstrating an economic vitality (based on its vineyards, cereal crops, yams and the exploration of lichen roccella which was being exported to Flanders for use in the dye industry), it was elevated to the status of {{pt:Vila}} on 3 June 1534, by decree of King John III of Portugal.

Other calamities have affected the early inhabitants: several dry seasons, numerous earthquakes and volcanic eruptions (1580–1757, 1808 and 1980), and on 21 July 1694 there occurred another tragic conflict that would later be known as the Motim dos Inhames (The Taro Revolt). It was a peasant uprising against an imposed tax or tithe on taro production. Taro was a staple of the peasant class, and tax on these tuberculosis generated a large revenue for the administrative government. After three years of leniency, in 1692, Francisco Lopes Beirão (the local sheriff) ordered his agents to pressure the locals to pay their "tax". This created tensions between the political and peasants classes, exploding into hostility in the community of Ribeira da Areia between citizens in the northern half of Calheta and tax-collectors from the village of Velas. Although this conflict was settled by the local vicar, Francisco Lopes Beirão petitioned the King, and he sent João de Soveral e Barbuda to São Jorge to determine and imprison the responsible parties. In the end many peasants, their supporters from the Council in Calheta and residents of Topo were interrogated, imprisoned and required to pay outstanding taxes. Many became penniless, died of famine, or were imprisoned in the Castle of São João Baptista, the prison in Angra do Heroísmo or the jail across the Canal in Horta. Future Calhetenses would use the leaves of the taro on their rifles in honour of the events.

The parochial Church of Santa Catarina was constructed following a fire that destroyed the original chapel (8 January 1639), that dated back to the early 16th century. As a convent was ordered constructed, on 12 May 1718, the church was also remodeled.

The Calhetense settlers did not escape the attacks and destruction caused by pirates in the waters of the archipelago. English and French privateers, in addition to Turkish and Algerian (Barbary Coast) pirates in the Canal between Pico and São Jorge, persisted during the 16-17th Centuries. In 1597, a section of the squadron commanded by the Count of Essex, attacked the village of Calheta. To repel the invaders, the inhabitants, hurled rocks (their only defense) from the cliffs at the English privateers attempting to reach the shore. During the battle, one Portuguese soldier, Simão Gote was able to rob the ensign of their flag, and escape with it victoriously. In the 18th century, the French corsair René Duguay-Trouin pillaged the settlements in São Jorge, and in 1816 an Algerian pirate, while attempting to hunt and capture a merchant clipper was shelled by the cannons in the local fort in Calheta.

The sheltered cove was elaborated in 1755, and a lighthouse constructed in 1873 to improve navigation and shipping.

In addition to the parochial church, the Church of Santo António was completed in 1816, along the Rua de Baixo which connects Calheta and Ribeira Seca.

The village was destroyed by the 9 July 1757 earthquake, which became known as Mandado de Deus (Sent by God); the earthquake (which was located off the northern coast of Calheta) was responsible for the complete destruction of the homes in the municipality and the death of 1200 people on the island.

The local philharmonic band was one of the earliest organizations to develop, and dates back to 1868.

A water network was completed in the principal urbanized area around 1878, with the completion of the local fountain.

== Geography ==
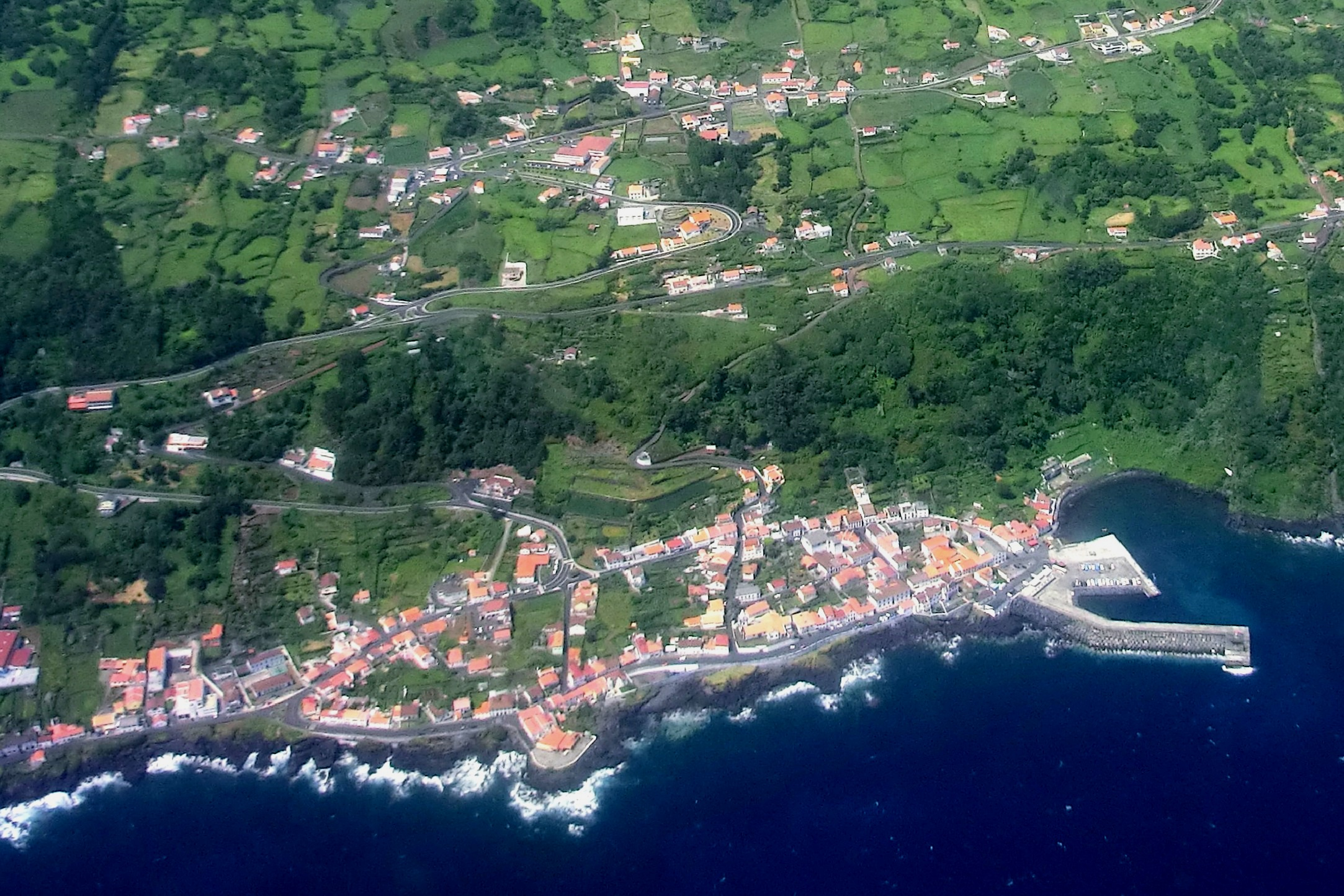
A view of the municipal seat of Calheta, the civil parish seat of the same name

The five parishes of Calheta are:

- Calheta
- Norte Pequeno
- Ribeira Seca
- Santo Antão
- Topo - it was the first municipality established on the island of São Jorge (currently fewer than 500 inhabitants), pioneered by a group of Flemish settlers, captained by Willem van der Haegen.

== Economy ==
The base of economic activities in the region are cattle-raising, agriculture and the processing of fish. Two tuna-processing factories exist in this municipalities: one in Fajã Grande and the other in proximity to the port of Calheta. Due to overfishing, activities in these factories have been suspended. Consequently, plans to convert the factory into a tourist hotel have progressed for the factory in Calheta. Yet, it is the collection and transformation of milk to produce the famous Queijo de São Jorge that drives local activities.

Similarly, the Port of Calheta used to be a center for the construction of trans-Atlantic ships, but has since been used for local fishing and trans-shipment services.

As the central place in the southern eastern part of the island, the area includes various banks, commercial establishments, as well as the location of the Volunteer Fire Department and the home of the island's Santa Casa da Misericórdia (home and support for the elderly). Over time, the influx of tourists has helped to transform the communities of the municipality, primarily due to the geological predominance of the fajãs in the region and the relatively unspoilt natural conditions in the interior. This has had the corollary effect of expanding the production and sale of local handicraft and traditional artisanal pastries/cookies.

== Architecture ==
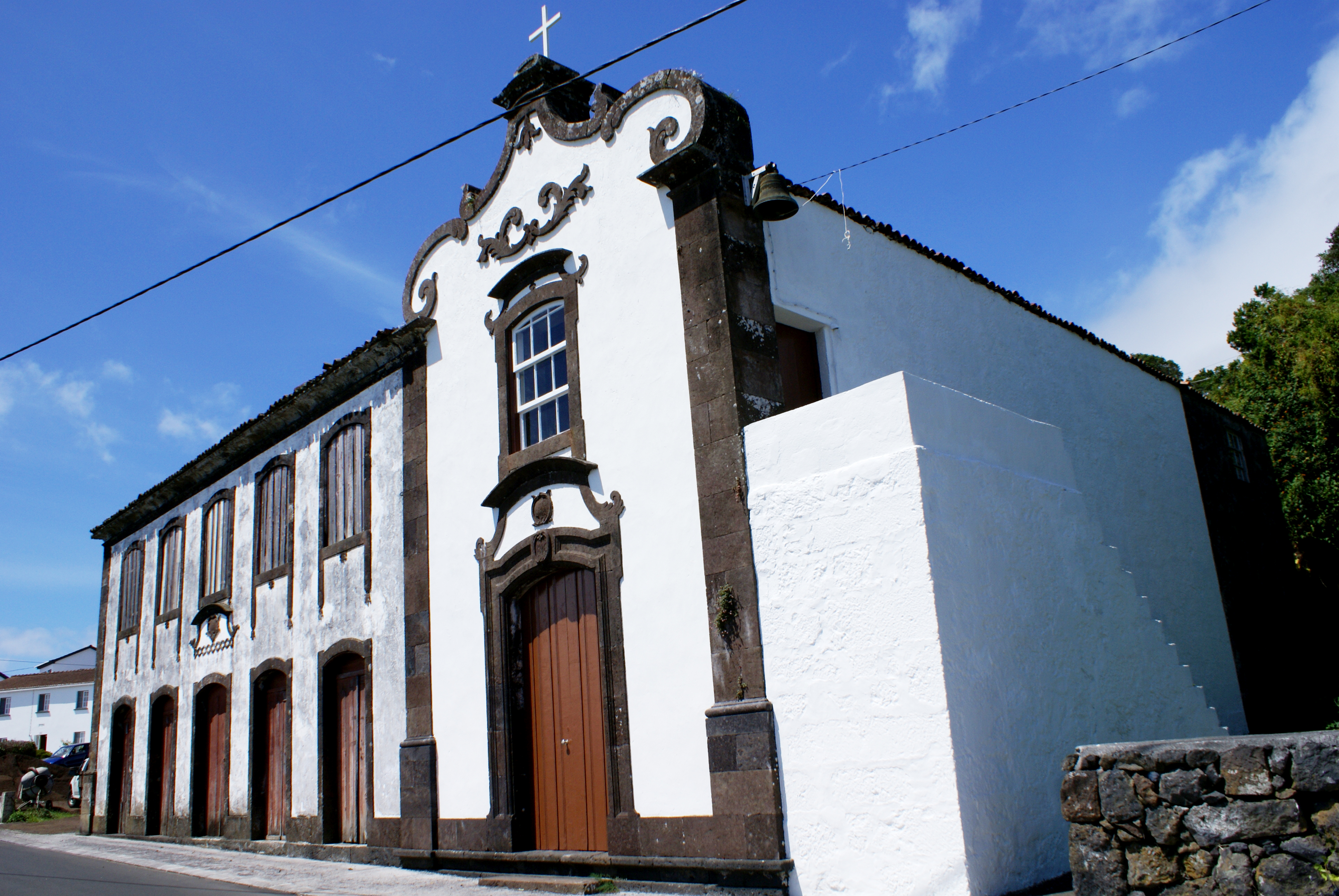
The simple facade of the residence and chapel-annex of the Manor of Santo António

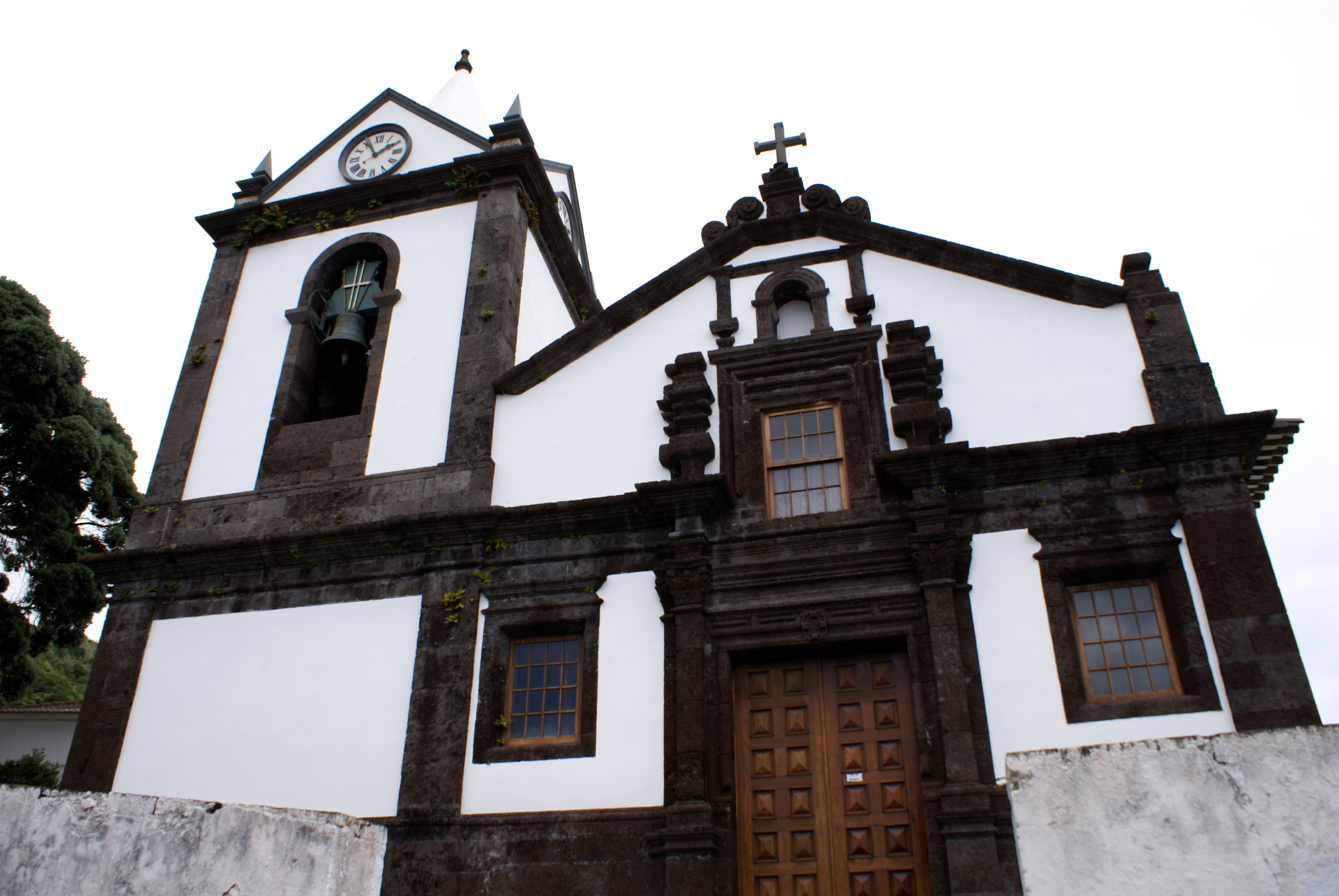
The front facade of the Church of Santa Catarina near the centre of the municipal seat

=== Civic ===
- Building of the Calheta Finance Office (Portuguese: Edifício da Repartição de Finanças da Calheta)
- Lighthouse of Ponta do Topo (Portuguese: Farol da Ponta do Topo)
- Manor of the Noronhas (Portuguese: Solar dos Noronhas), the manorhouse was named for the rural landed-gentry of the period, and conveys an importance and wealth associated with the 16th century family who had ties with the Royal Household of Queen Catherine;
- Manor of the Tiagos (Portuguese: Casa dos Tiagos/Solar dos Tiagos), displaying signeurial architecture of the period, this 18th- to 19th-century L-shaped building was constructed by the last Captain-major of Topo, Tiago Gregório Homem da Costa Noronha.

=== Religious ===
- Church of Santa Catarina (Portuguese: Igreja Paroquial da Calheta/Igreja de Santa Catarina), construction began on 8 January 1639 after the original 16th-century building was destroyed by fire, a legend grew up around it and annual processions were instituted to commemorate the religiosity of the events;
- Church of Nossa Senhora do Rosário (Portuguese: Igreja Paroquial de Topo/Igreja de Nossa Senhora do Rosário), one of the earliest temples constructed in the municipality, the church was built in the 16th century, by summarily destroyed in the often cited Mandado de Deus (Sent from God) earthquake and only completed in 1761;
- Church of São Lázaro (Portuguese: Igreja Paroquial de Norte Pequeno/Igreja de São Lázaro)
- Church of São Tiago (Portuguese: Igreja Paroquial de Ribeira Seca/Igreja de São Tiago)
- Church of Santo Antão (Portuguese: Igreja Paroquial de Santo Antão/Igreja de Santo Antão)
- Sanctuary of Santo Cristo da Caldeira (Portuguese: Capela do Santo Cristo da Caldeira/Santuário do Santo Cristo da Caldeira)

== Culture ==
The largest manifestation of local culture is exemplified in the popular activities associated with local philharmonic bands, the religiosity of its population and its association with the Cult of the Holy Spirit.

For many years, the Jorgense culture has been recognized in the local region for its musical abilities. The number of philharmonic bands at one time was greater than the number of civil parishes. Musical interest also extended to the traditional dances, where many played or danced to a folkloric style that included Chamarrita, Saudade, Samacaio, Pézinho, Lira, and Pêssegos. Many of the ethnographic groups that were formed in the 20th century were an attempt to protect and maintain these traditional dance forms and melodies, in addition to the typically rural dress associated a bygone age. Of note, the Grupo Etnográfico da Calheta (Ethnographic Group of Calheta) was recognized for its research and investigations into traditional music and dress.

== Notable citizens ==
- Francisco de Lacerda, (Wiki PT) (Riberia Seca, 11 May 1869 — Lisbon, 18 July 1934) composer, musicologist and folklorist, was considered one of the best musical directors in 19th-century Europe. Leaving his home Fajã da Fragueira for the world, he passed through various cities on the continent (Porto and Lisbon in particular), before settling in France, where he continued his roles in music, abdicating a promising course in medicine.
