= Topo (Calheta) =

- Civil parish
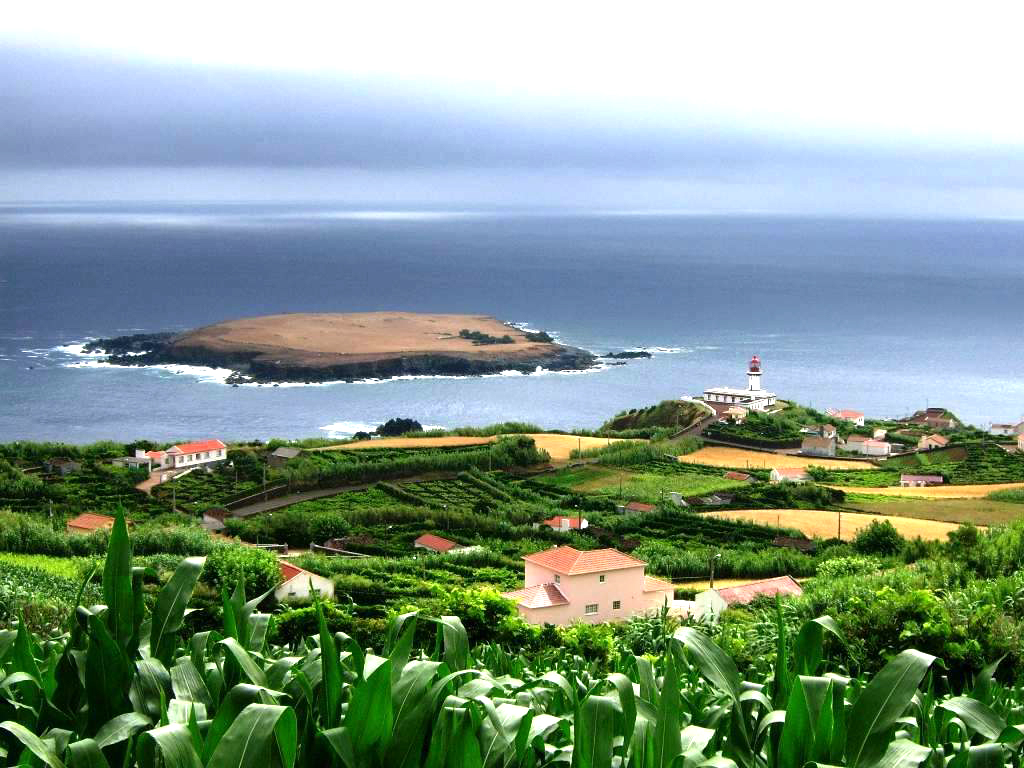
- The islet of the parish of Topo is the extreme easterly extension of the island of São Jorge, as seen from the villa of Topo

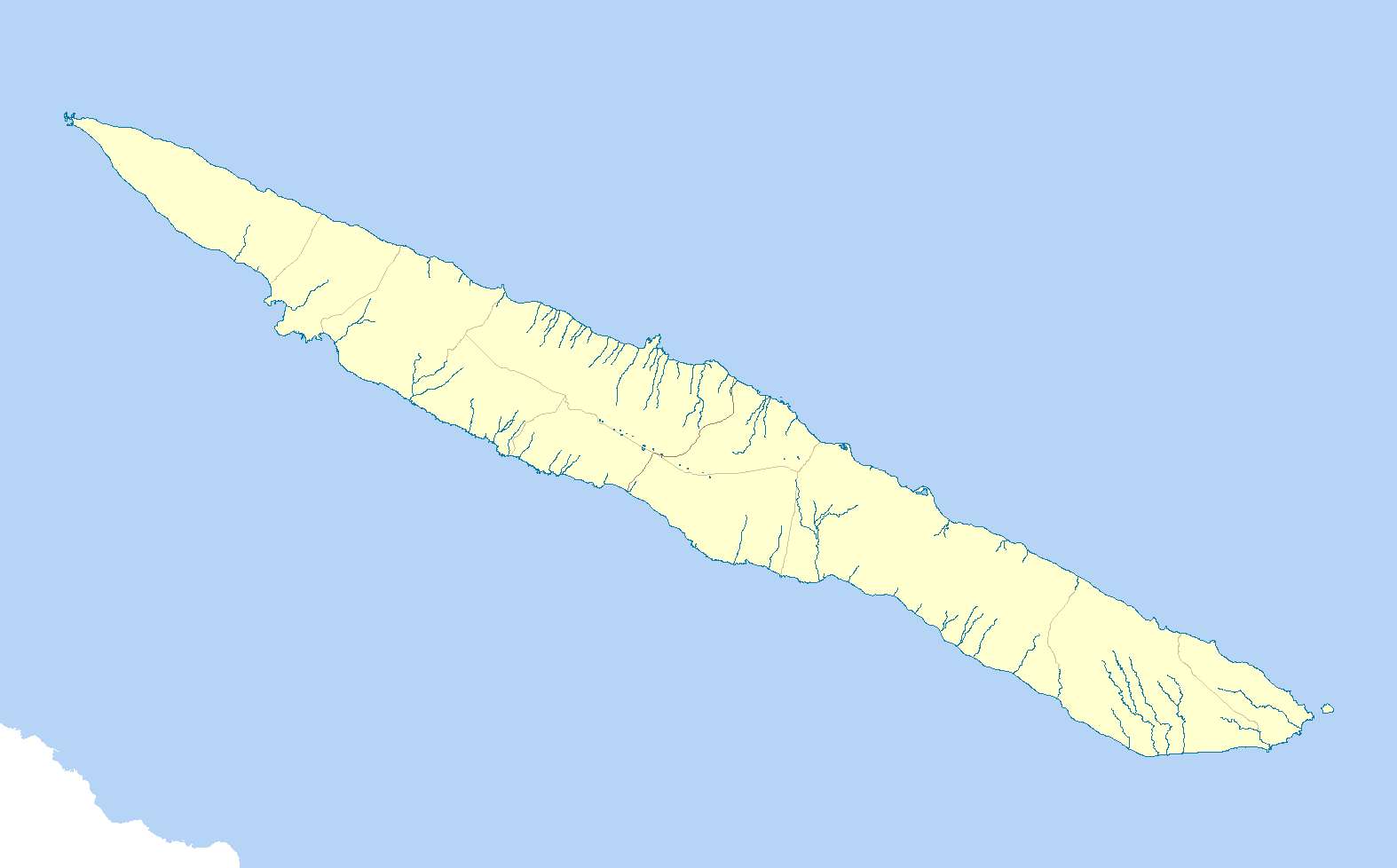
- Location in the Azores Topo (São Jorge)
- Coordinates: 38°32′55″N 27°46′3″W
- Country: Portugal
- Auton. region: Azores
- Island: São Jorge
- Municipality: Calheta
- Established: Settlement: c. 1480

Area
  - Total: 9.24 km^{2} (3.57 sq mi)
- Elevation: 136 m (446 ft)

Population (2011)
  - Total: 508
  - Density: 55.0/km^{2} (142/sq mi)
- Time zone: UTC−01:00 (AZOT)
  - Summer (DST): UTC+00:00 (AZOST)
- Postal code: 9875-165
- Area code: 292
- Patron: Nossa Senhora do Rosário

Topo, also known as Nossa Senhora do Rosário, is a freguesia ("civil parish") on the northeastern corner of the municipality Calheta on the island of São Jorge. It is considered the first settlement on the island of São Jorge to attain the status of municipality; from 1510 to 1867 "Vila do Topo" was the municipal seat of Topo, which included the neighboring parish of Santo Antão. The population in 2011 was 508, in an area of 9.24 km^{2}.

== History ==
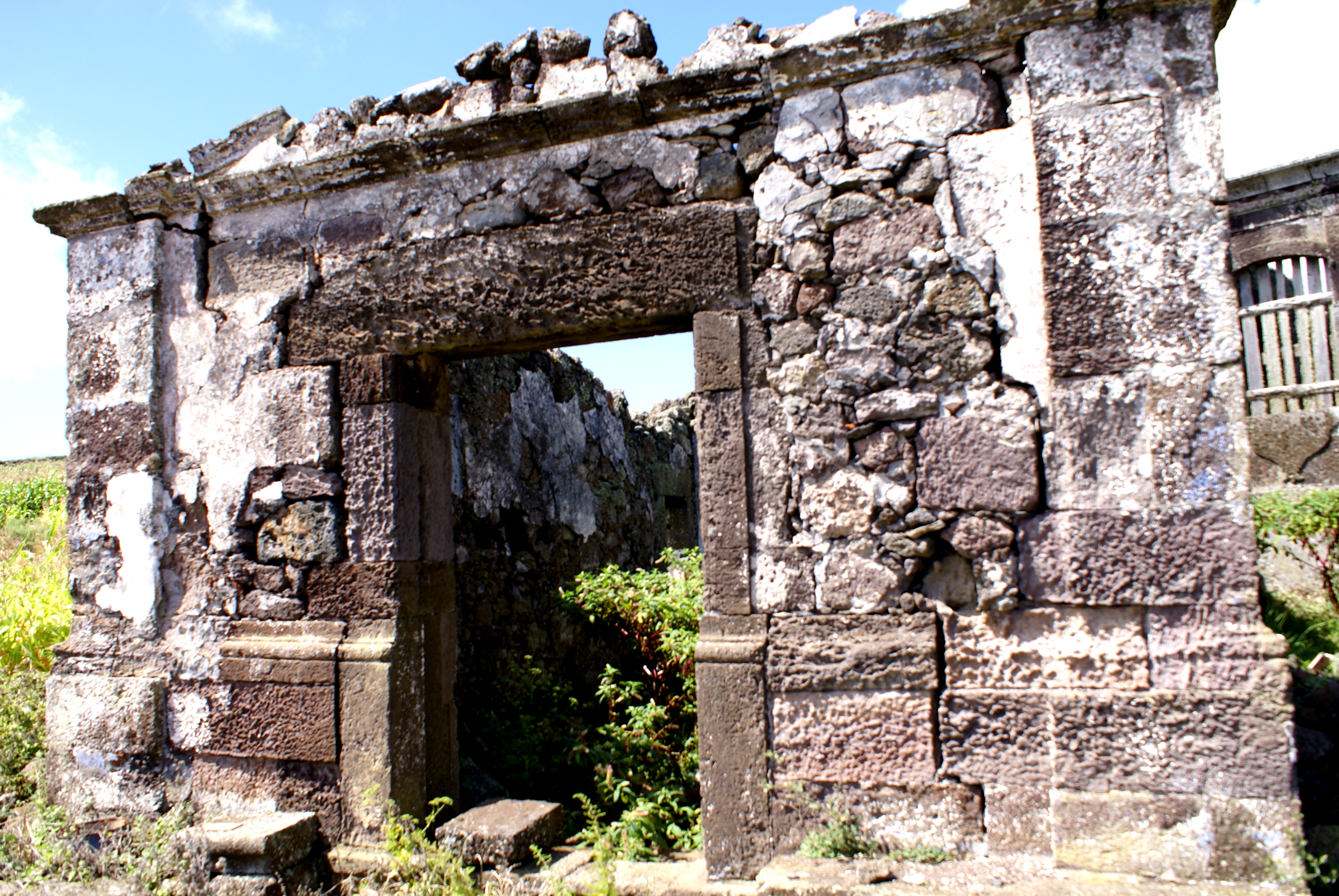
Entrance portico to the ruins of the Chapel of the Solar dos Tiagos, burial place of Willem van der Haegen, Flemish settler and founder of the village of Topo

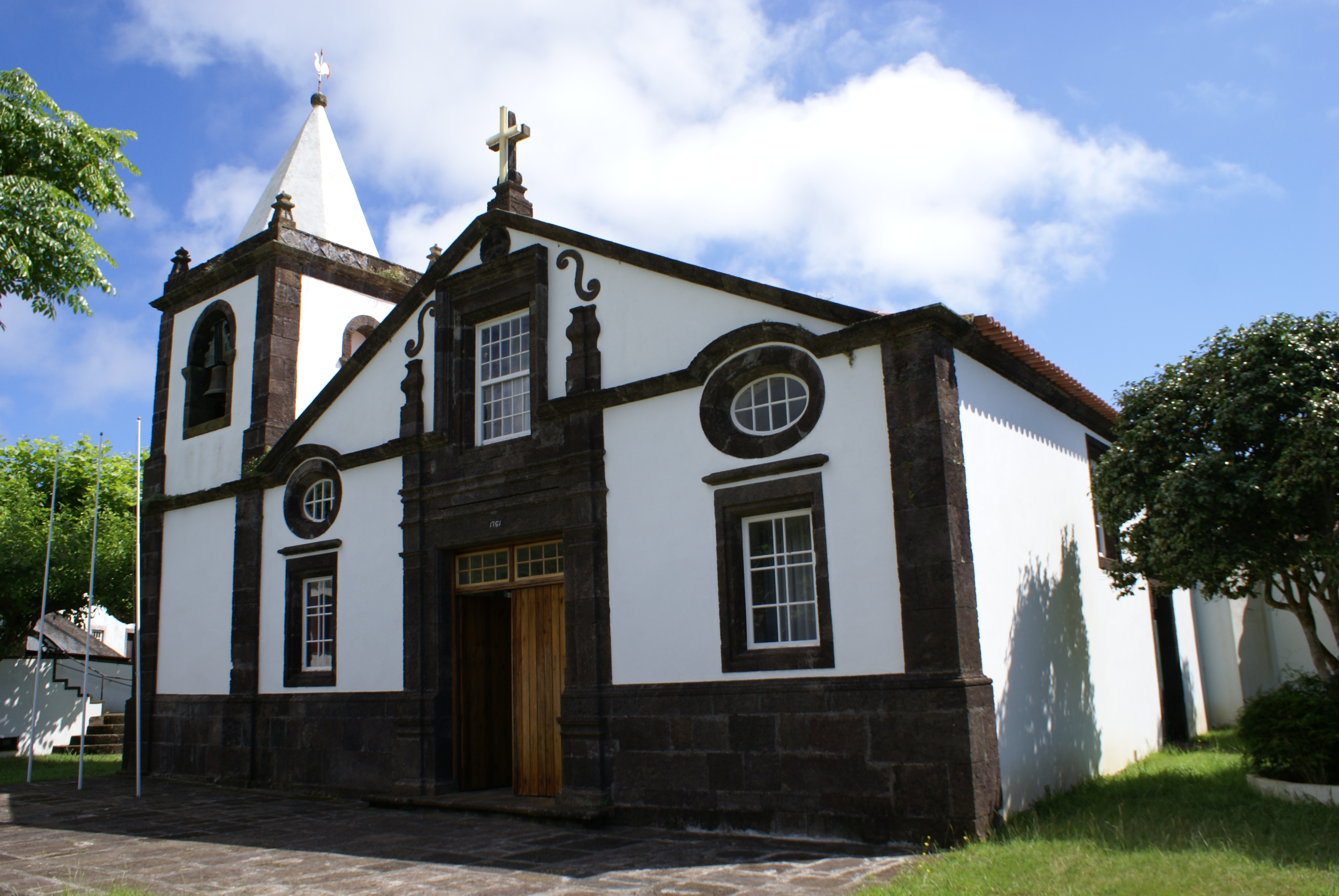
Church of Nossa Senhora do Rosário, remodelled after the Mandado de Deus

Debate still exists on whether Topo was the first settlement on the island; the first colony was founded between 1480 and 1490, when a colony of Flemish people, under the direction of Willem van der Haegen, settled on the eastern coast. This adventurous Fleming, who later adopted the name "Guilherme da Silveira", and whose descendants populate the numerous villages of São Jorge, was later buried in the chapel-annex of the Solar dos Tiagos. Due to its proximity to Terceira, and owing to the difficult overland links to Calheta (over the Serra do Topo), the village was always more closely tied to Angra do Heroísmo: inter-marriage existed between both communities and the residents of Angra saw Topo as an extension of the city of Angra. This proximity is visible in similar architectural styles, which are different from the other communities of São Jorge.

Until the middle of the 20th century, port of Topo was a referential point in the maritime connection with Terceira due to its location. Although this coast was punctuated by steep cliffs, a staircase to the Cais velho and successive remodelling (between 1560 and 1637) allowed access to the village by sea. The port, and its access to Terceira, was so important that after the villages annexation by Calheta, the construction of the first lighthouse was deliberated in favour of Topo.

Due to its population growth, the community was elevated to the status of village on September 12, 1510, transforming itself into one of the Captaincies of the island. Unfortunately, its further growth was curtailed by its limited hinterland, which would not allow further expansion economically. In fact, the village of Topo, until the middle of the 20th century did not have an adequate overland link to the rest of the island, and relied on its port. In the October 24, 1855 rationalization of the administrative divisions of the Azores, the municipality of Topo was disincorporated and merged into the administration of the municipality of Calheta (on April 1, 1870)

Although its title of "village" was removed, the community retained is urban distinction, with many community roadways and architecturally distinct buildings absent in the rest of the archipelago. For this reason, the community still took on the veneer of a "village", whose loss was never really accepted by the population. Realizing these circumstances, a decree of the Regional Legislature (n.º 29/2003/A) devolved and re-established the village's classification as village on June 24, 2003, making Topo the official third village on the island.

The village has been devastated by the locally-known Mandado de Deus ("Sent by God") earthquake, which occurred on July 9, 1757, as well as the more recent January 1, 1980 earthquake, causing the destruction and instability of many homes. The primitive church, dating back to the 16th century, was destroyed during the event. It was reconstructed under the guidance of Father Matias Pereira de Sousa, and directed by José de Avelar de Melo, concluding in 1761: in two mass graves around the church, 84 victims of the Mandado de Deus were buried.

During the whaling era, in the middle of the 19th century, the port of Topo was the first on the island to support and replenish whalers; the first company was founded in 1885. The boats were guarded in dug-out caves along the southern cliffs.

Topo was also destroyed in 1980, during an earthquake that caused the forced emigration of many of its residence, and responsible for the death of 11 and the disappearance of 9 others. The movement of several tonnes of rock and debris in the north, forced the abandonment of many lands in the northern coast.

From a population of 2000 inhabitants the local community fell to 500 residents in a process of rapid depopulation that has not concluded. The decision, in 1997, to transform the old Franciscan Convent of São Diogo into a primary school. With this change the village has been able to stabilize the current population, and attract new functions, including: a Sports Pavilion, cantina, laboratories and public library. Similarly, by 1970 many yachts and sail boats used Topo as a stopover on trans-Atlantic and inter-island voyages.

== Geography ==
=== Physical geography ===
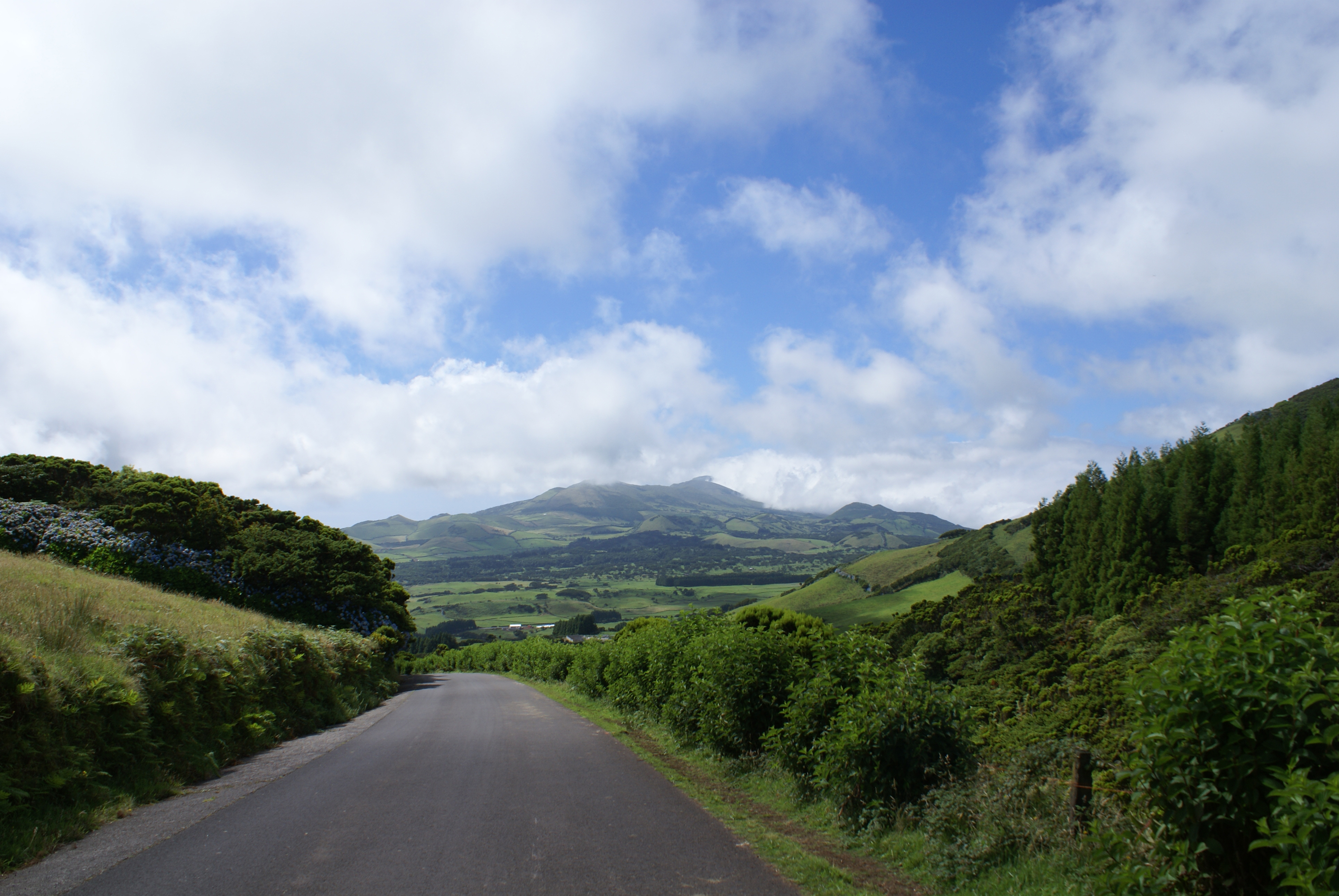
The dividing range of Serra do Topo and Cume dos Arrebentões, that separates Topo from the rest of São Jorge

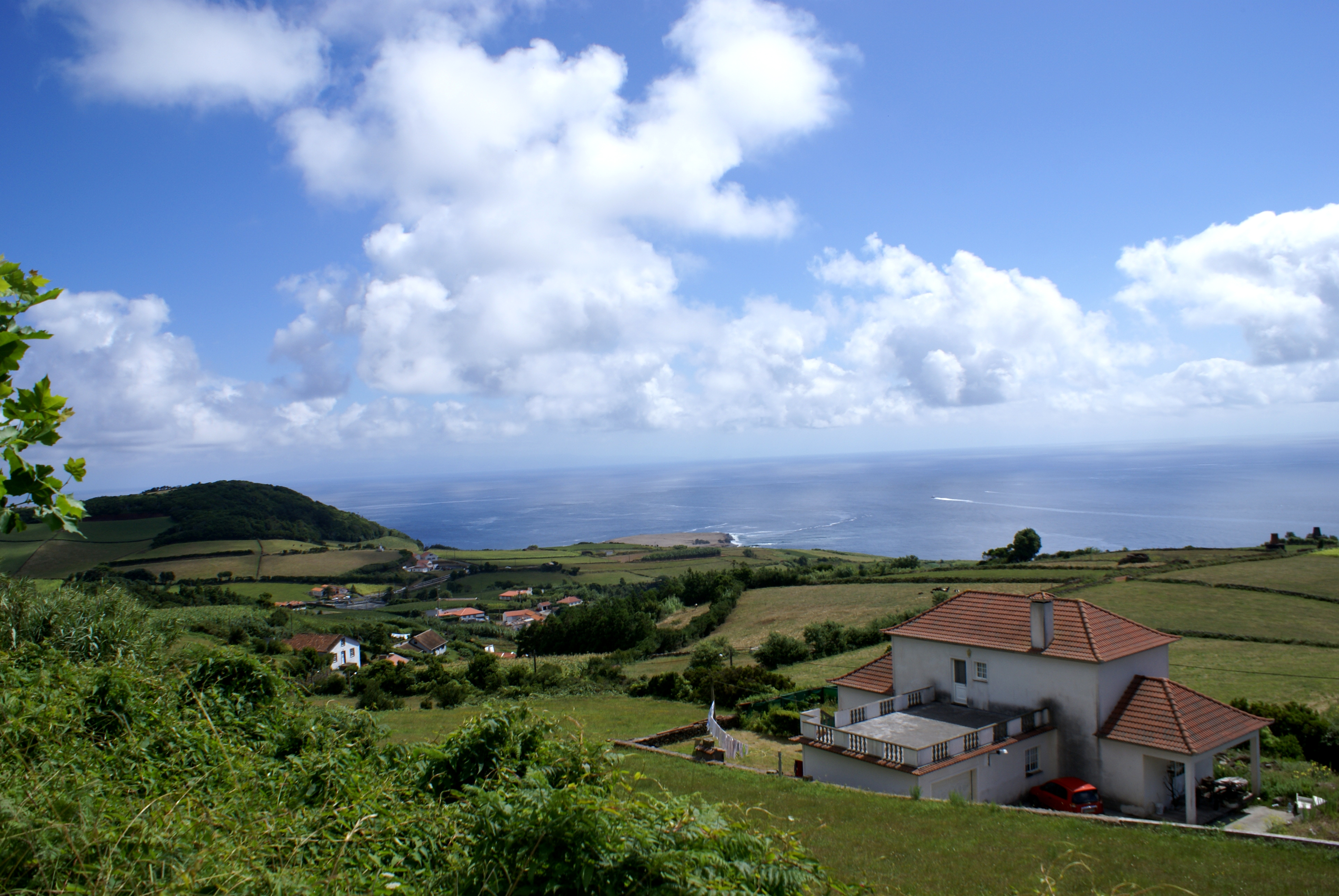
A view from the Topo Lookout, showing the beginning of the village

The village of Topo is located in the extreme southeast of the island of São Jorge, on a relatively planar terrain with a gentle slope that begins at Ponta do Topo and extends to the parish of Santo Antão, separated from the rest of the island by rugged Serra do Topo. In addition to Cume dos Arrebentões, Topo is the location of several volcanic peaks formed during the geological timeline, including The fertile plain in this area is known for the cultivation of wheat: the unique area in the Azores to still produce the crop annually. The Serra do Arrebentão, its various peaks (such as Pico do Facho, Pico das Rocas, Pico dos Frades and Pico da Pedra Vermelha), the northern coastal cliffs and the Grota das Pedras Brancas river-valley has made sea access historically more important than overland trails. Its privileged access to Terceira was an important part of Topo's development, permitting commercial prosperity and cultivating familial links with Terceira, reflected in similar language patterns, architectural styles and ancestral relations between the islands.

==== Ecoregions/Protected areas ====
- Volcanic Complex of Topo - a volcanic region that encompasses the southern third of and includes a scenery of various shield and spatter cones;
- Topo Belvedere/Lookout - constructed in 2005, this lookout offers an extended vista from the Complex of Topo to the island of Terceira, and the village of Topo;
- Canada do Pessegueiro Belvedere/Lookout - located near the Vale das Éguas, it is a lookout that offers a vista of the zone of Calheta as well as the São Jorge-Pico Canal until the island of Pico;
- Pico do Facho - 854m altitude peak, located near Ribeira dos Vimes and Fajã dos Vimes between Pico dos Frades and Pico dos Cabecinhos, forming a plume of lava and pyroclastic debris along the southern coast;
- Pico dos Cabecinhos - 728m altitude peak located near Pico do Facho, Fajã do Salto Verde, Fajã do Nortezinho, Fajã do Norte Estreito and near the Fajã da Ribeira Funda, that forms a plume of lava and pyroclastic debris along the southern coast.

=== Human geography ===
Topo comprises several individual communities/neighbourhoods identified by locals from small agglomerations along intersections and centres of activities, including: Engenho, Levada, Lomba, Pontinha, São Pedro and Topo.

== Architecture ==
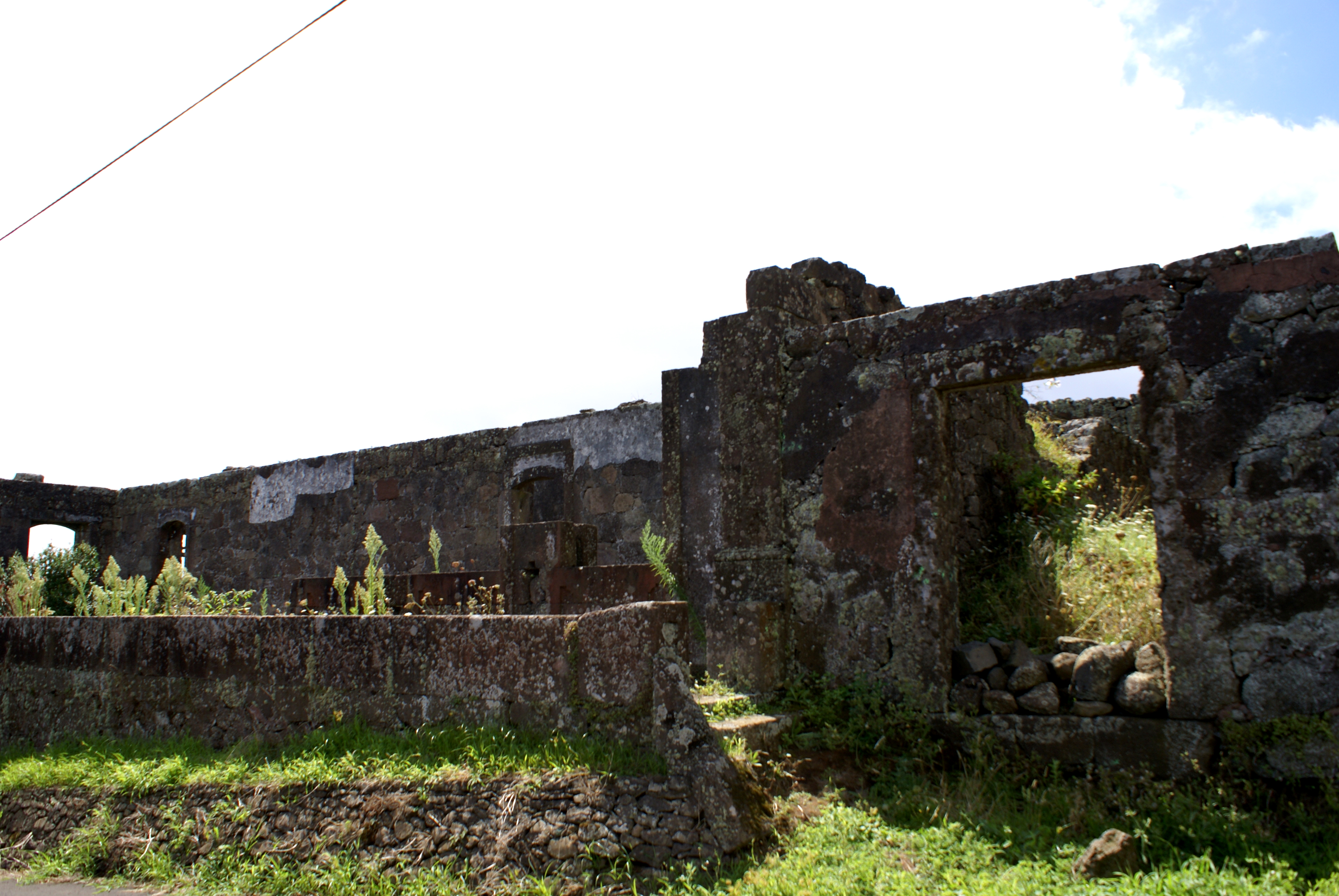
The ruins of the Tiago family homestead before its restoration

=== Civic ===
- Manor of the Tiagos (Portuguese: Solar dos Tiagos), manor/provincial house and its chapel-annex, burial-tomb of Flemish pioneer Willem van der Haegen;
- Port of Topo (Portuguese: Porto do Topo), carved from the reddish-cliffs and rock outcroppings

=== Military ===
- Fort of Topo (Portuguese: Forte do Topo), a military fortification used in the south-eastern defense of São Jorge, from pirates and privateers seeking conquest of Portuguese shipping returning from Africa and India.

=== Religious ===
- Convent of São Diogo (Portuguese: Convento do São Diogo), recently remodelled as the Escola Básica Integrada (primary school), it incorporates the older residence and church;
- Church of Nossa Senhora do Rosário (Portuguese: Igreja do Topo/Igreja de Nossa Senhora do Rosário), dating from 1761, it was rebuilt in honour of the residents who perished during the Mandado de Deus;
- Império of the Brotherhood of the Divine Holy Spirit (Portuguese: Império da Irmandade do Divino Espírito Santo), constructed in the Terceirense-style, it is still used in the annual feast days associated with the Holy Spirit

== Notable citizens ==
- Willem van der Haegen (c. 1430; Flanders, Bruges or Maastricht - c. 1510; Topo), Flemish entrepreneur and settler, remembered for his early colonization of Flores, settlement on Terceira, and eventual founding of the Flemish community of Topo;
- Bishop D. Manuel Bernardo de Sousa Enes (5 November 1814; Topo - 8 September 1887; Macau), titular of the Diocese of Macau from 1874–1883, before returning to Portugal where he was Bishop of Braganza-Miranda and later Portalegre.
