= Solar dos Tiagos =

Manor house in Azores, Portugal

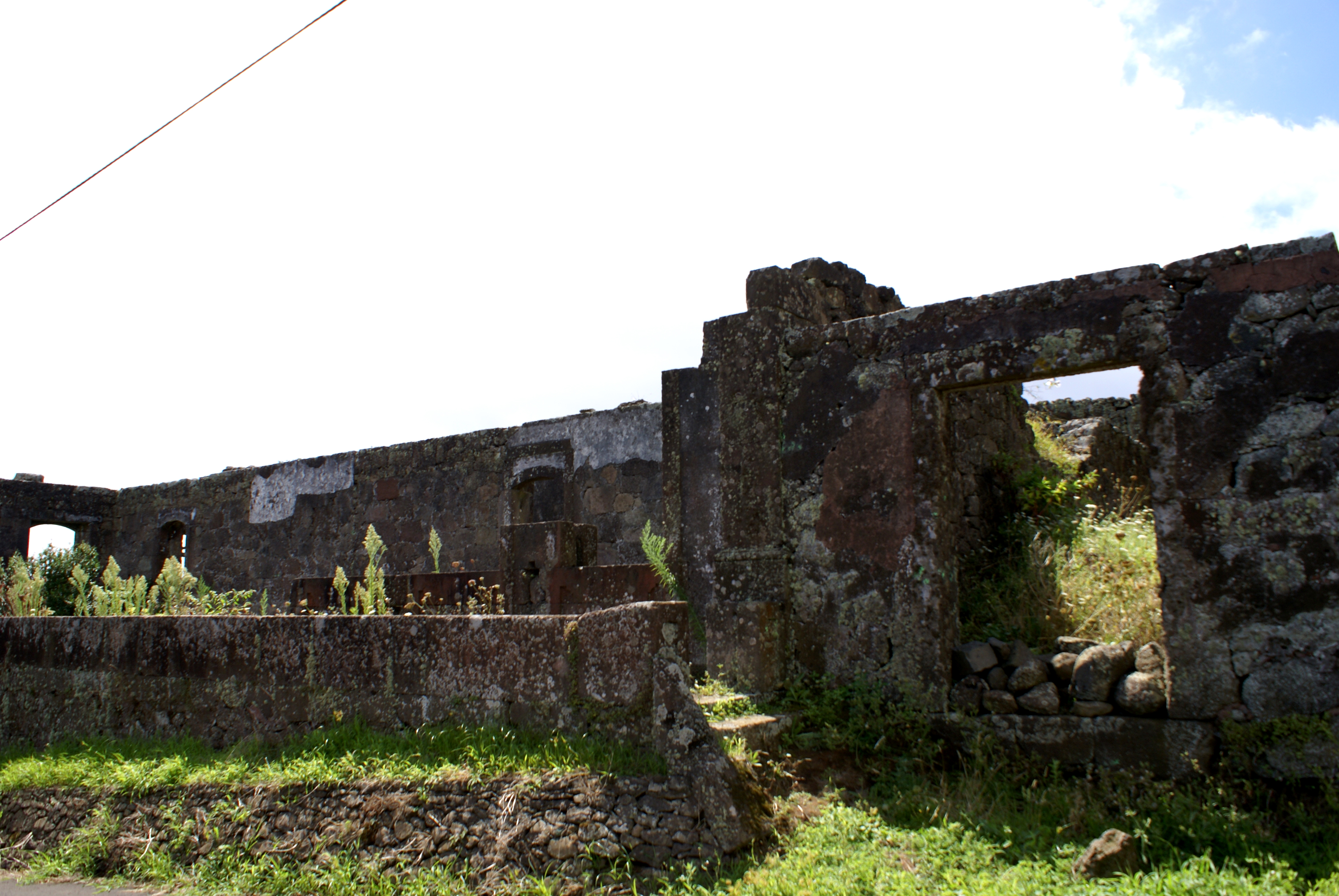
- Part of the L-shaped manorhouse

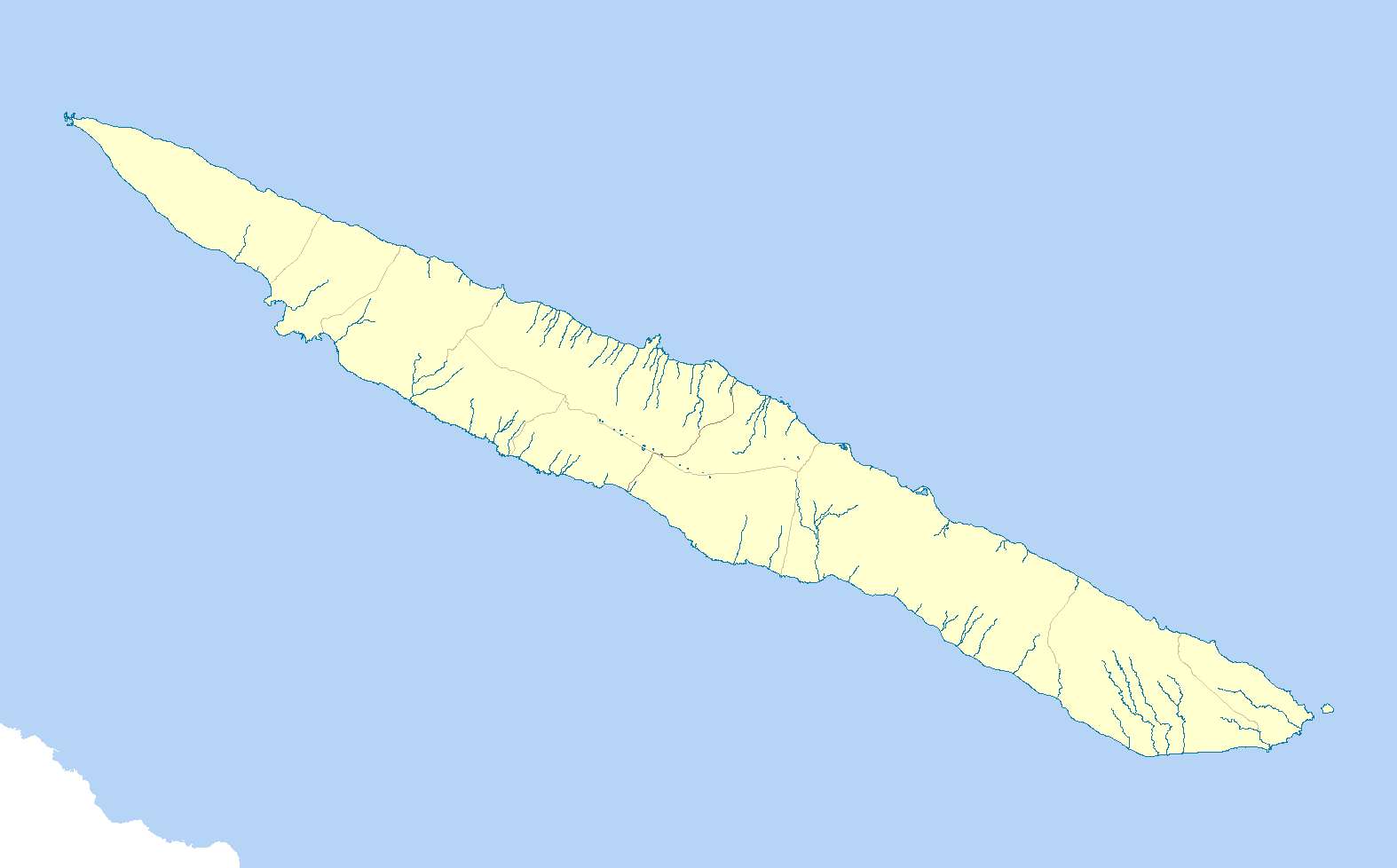
- Location of the manorhouse within the municipality of Calheta

General information
- Type: Manorhouse
- Architectural style: Medieval
- Location: Topo, Portugal
- Coordinates: 38°32′39.14″N 27°45′45.02″W
- Owner: Portuguese Republic

Technical details
- Material: Basalt

The Solar dos Tiagos is a solar (manor house) in the civil parish of Topo, in the municipality of Calheta, on the Portuguese island of São Jorge in the archipelago of the Azores. The manor grounds contain a chapel notable as the burial place of Willem van der Haegen, an early settler of the Azores.

== History ==
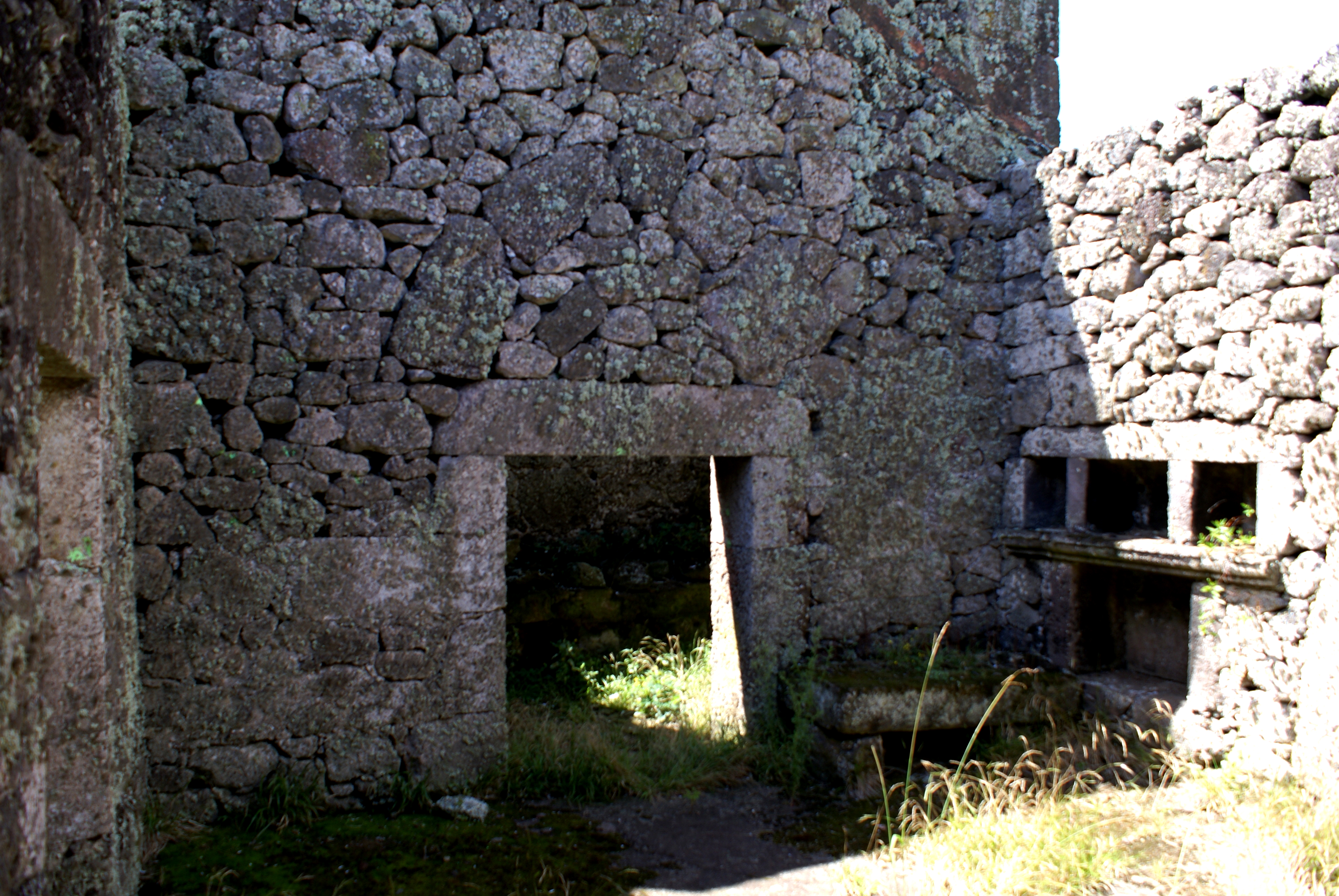
Interior ruins of the manor of the Tiagos.

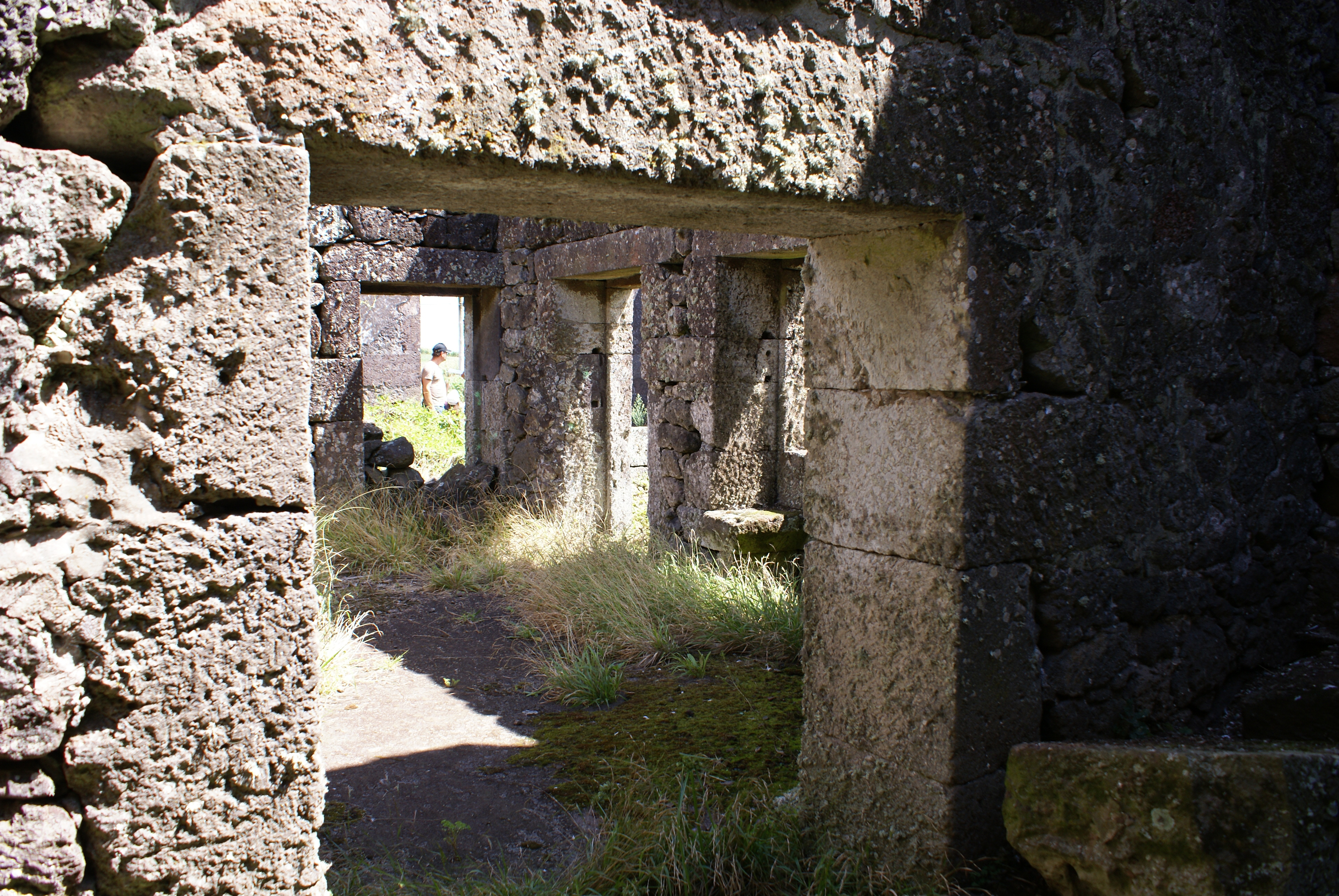
Corridors and spaces within the first floor of the Tiagos' residence.

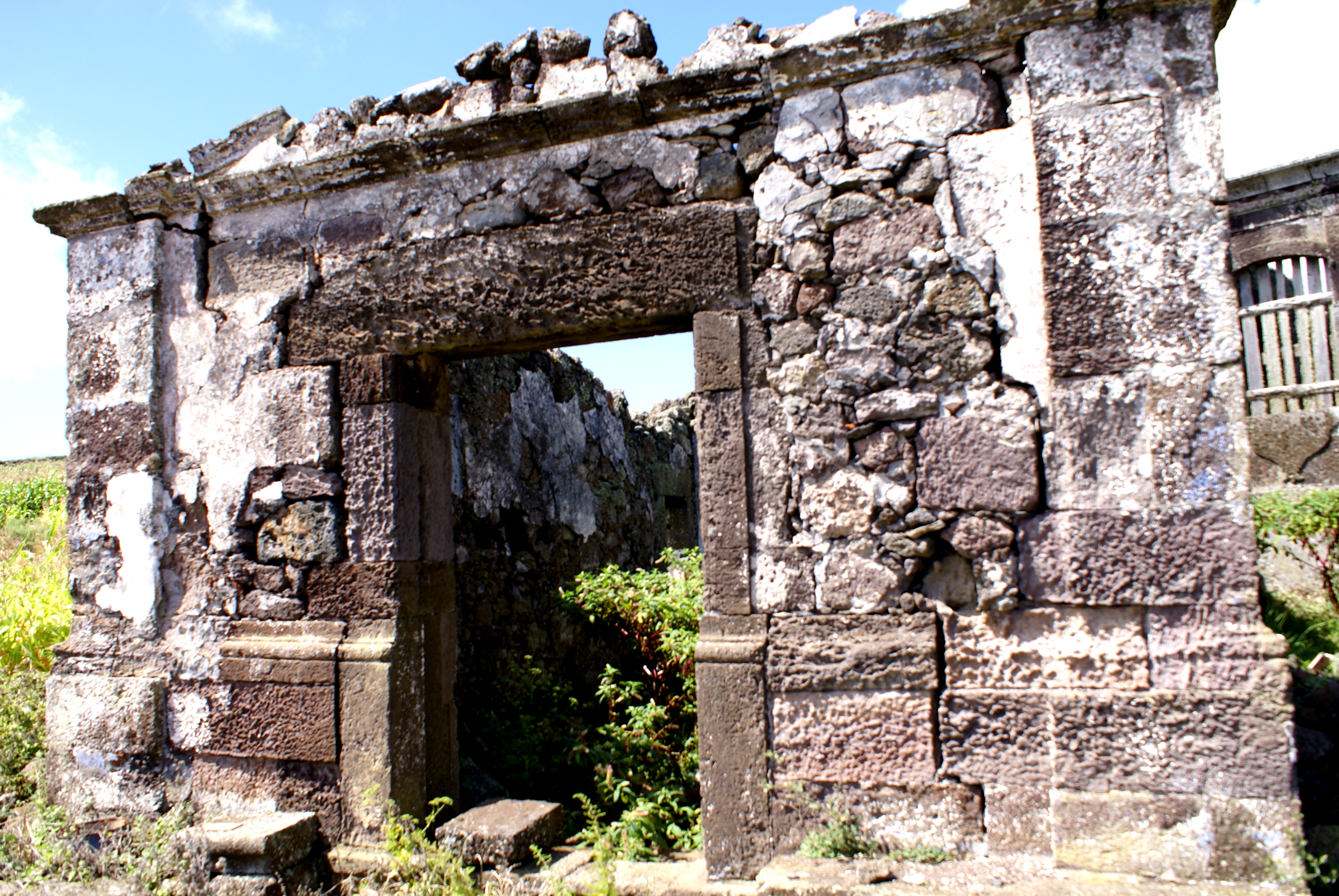
Ruins of the chapel on the property of the manorhouse.

Solar dos Tiagos is characteristic of the signeurial architecture of São Jorge. Tiago Gregório Homem da Costa Noronha, the last captain-major of Topo and closest relative of the seventh captain-major António da Silveira Ávila, constructed the manor during the mid eighteenth to mid nineteenth centuries.

The solar contains a chapel predating the eighteenth-century manor house. This chapel is also known as the hermitage of São Lázaro (Saint Lazarus). Flemish merchant and early Azorean settler Willem van der Haegen was buried in this chapel in the early 1500s.

Both structures are currently in ruins.

== Architecture ==
The manor house ruins are located on a hilltop promontory near the port and settlement of Topo. São Lázaro chapel is southeast of the manor house. Historically, a large farm and pasture surrounded the manor.

The main house's L-shaped plan is oriented northeast–southwest. The house's longer leg runs parallel to the adjacent road and contains a balcony with two doors separated by tightly spaced windows. In the rightmost part of the balcony alongside the ruins is a staircase. On the left, the balcony terminates at another staircase leading to the São Lázaro hermitage. A richly carved curved cornice, sculpted basalt framing at window and door openings, and four windows decorate the house's southeast façade.

The shorter wing of the house is perpendicular to the main wing and comprises the former kitchen. It is heavily subdivided and includes a fireplace, ovens with high walls, recessed nooks for china and plates, and a large recessed sink.

The São Lázaro hermitage is oriented towards the east. Only its exterior masonry walls remain standing. These walls contain vestiges of plaster and whitewash. The hermitage was built atop a platform with short bounding walls. This platform functioned as a courtyard and was historically landscaped.
