= Church of Nossa Senhora do Rosário (Calheta) =

- Church of Our Lady of the Rosary
- Igreja de Nossa Senhora do Rosário
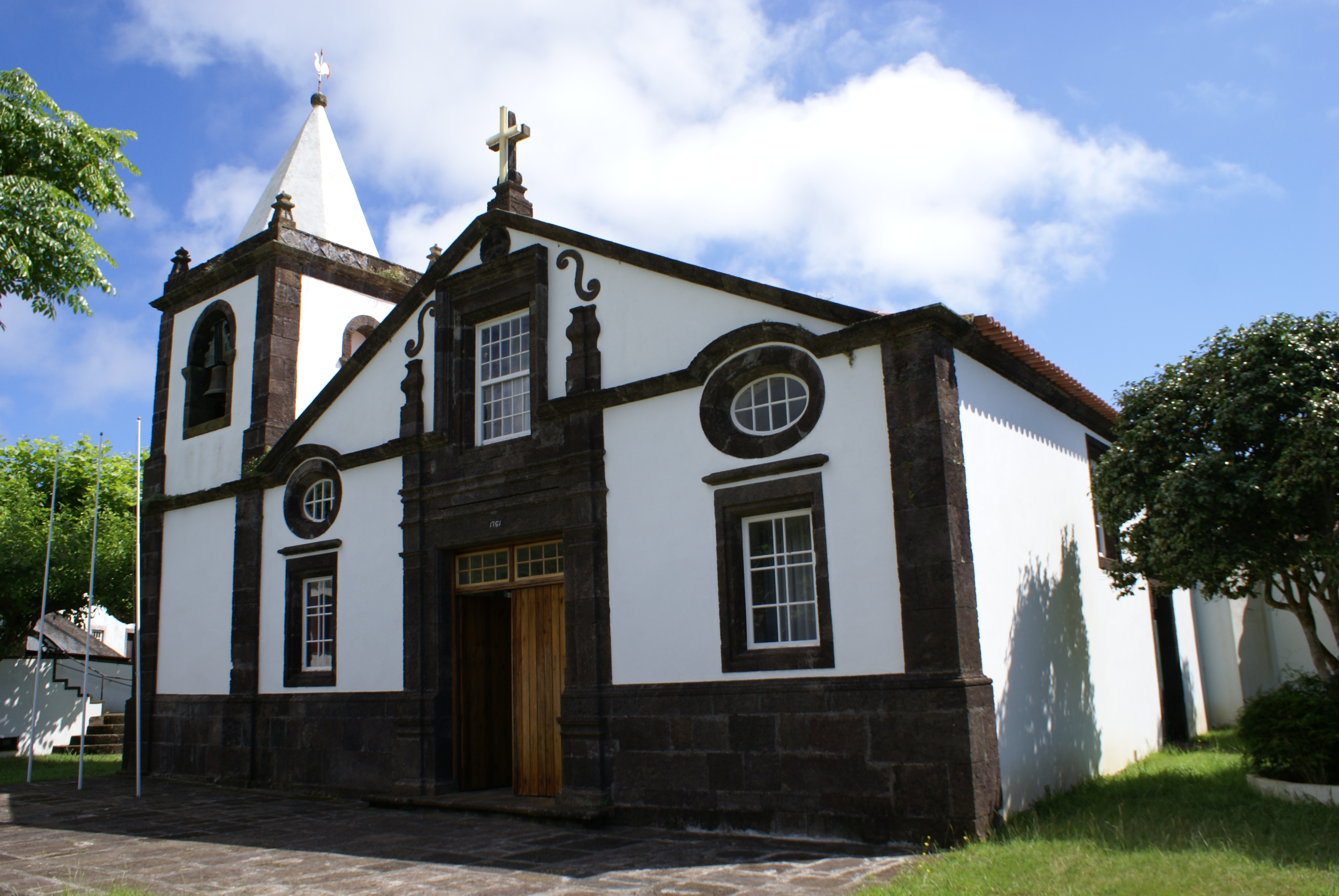
- The front facade of the Church, showing its place in the community of Topo

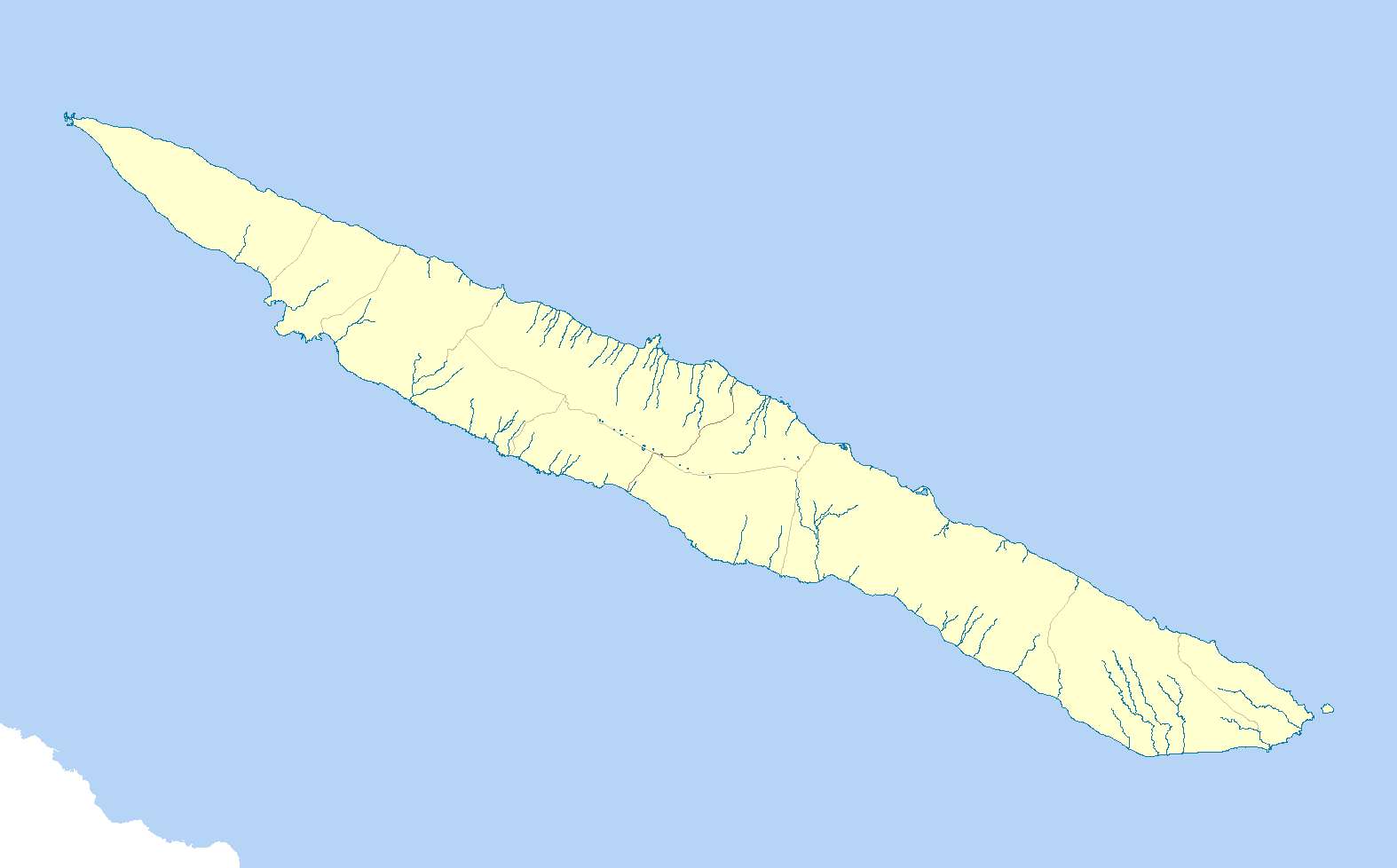
- Location of the church on the island of São Jorge
- 38°32′55″N 27°46′3″W
- Location: São Jorge, Central, Azores
- Country: Portugal
- Denomination: Roman Catholic

History
- Dedication: Virgin Mary

Architecture
- Architect: José de Avelar de Melo
- Style: Roman

Administration
- Diocese: Catholic Church/Diocese of Angra do Heroísmo

The Church of Nossa Senhora do Rosário (Portuguese: Igreja de Nossa Senhora do Rosário) is a 16th-century Azorean temple in the civil parish of Nossa Senhora do Rosário, municipality of Calheta, Azores, being reconstructed after the Mandado de Deus earthquake that affected the islands of São Jorge and Pico.

== History ==
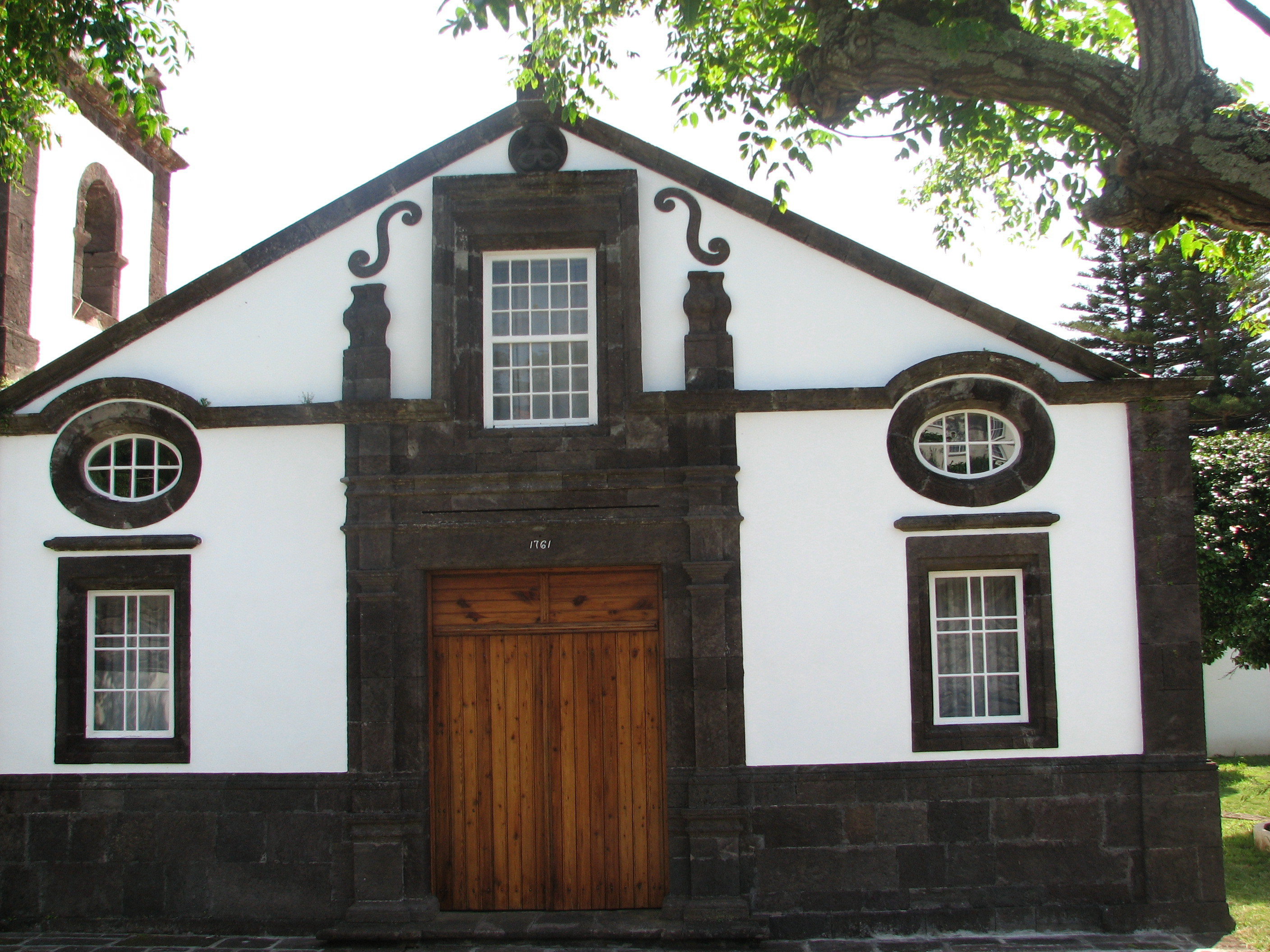
The Baroque facade, showing main portico and decorative elements

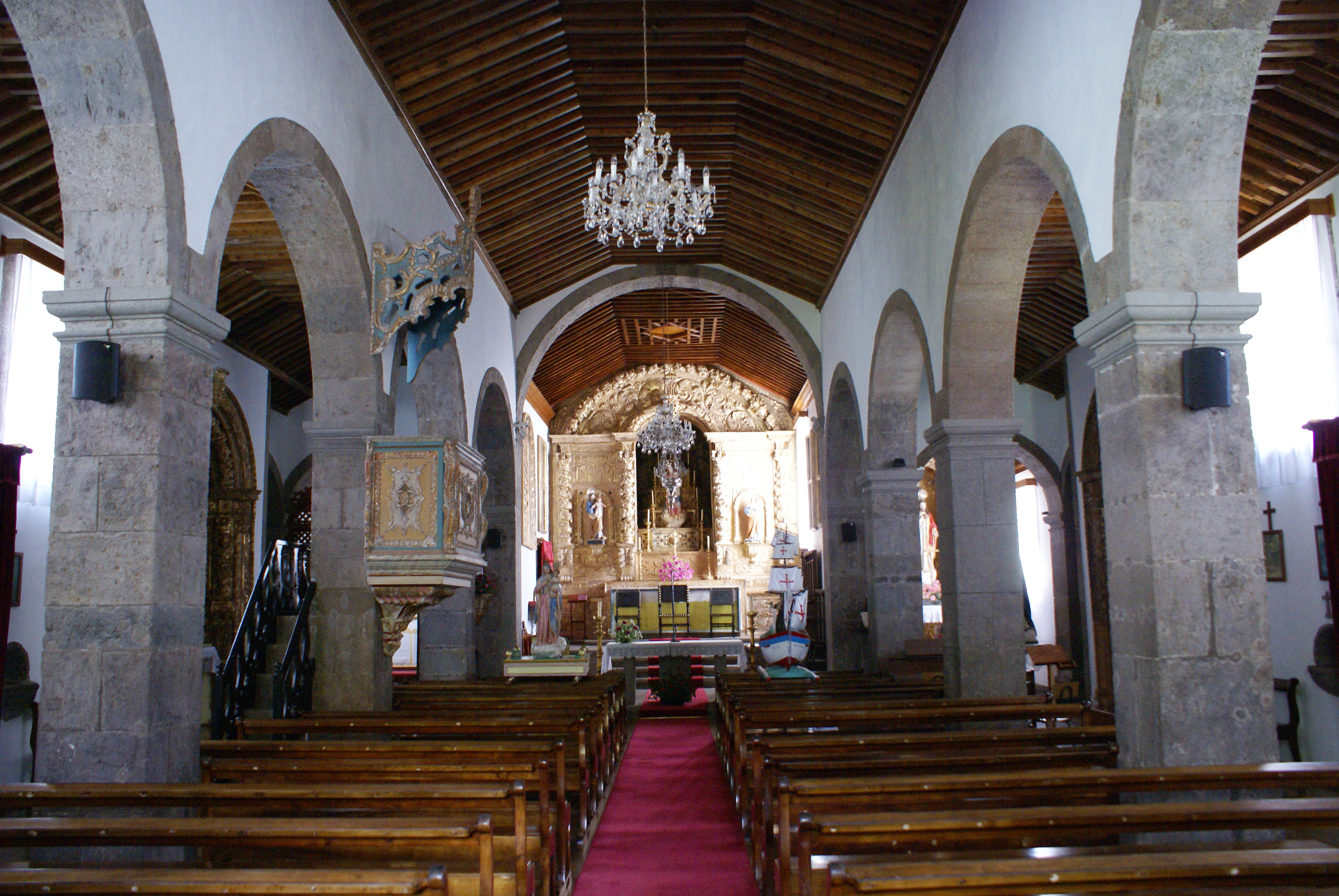
The interior nave, showing the retable and ornate gilded pulpit

The primitive church was likely constructed in the 16th century.

On 9 July 1757, the church was seriously damaged by the earthquake that became known, colloquially, as the Mandado de Deus (Sent from God)". It was Father Matias Pereira de Sousa, who initiated the reconstruction of the church, at the same time burying 84 victims of the Mandado in two common graves. The restoration works were placed under the supervision and direction of architect José de Avelar de Melo. In 1761, the construction was completed.

On 29 May 1895, the organ, which was built in Horta, for Manuel de Serpa da Silva for 900$000 réis, by the artist Marcelino Lima, and installed in the lateral space to the left of the altar. Later it was transferred to the choir, becoming destroyed since it could not fit in the space.

On 1 January 1980, the village of Topo was destroyed by an earthquake.

== Architecture ==
The principal facade consists of a single storey nave with massive pediment, surmounted by stone cross, completed in stone masonry, with the corners in natural stone, while the remainder whitewashed. A two-door rectangular portico is flanked by square pilasters and surmounted by cornice and lintel. The square-pilasters extend vertically into the pediment, and are topped by ornate relief, while on either side of the pediment are vegetal elements. Apart from the main doorway, the facade is broken by three large rectangular windows (two on either side of, and one over, the doorway), in addition to two oculae over the lateral windows. At the apex of the pediment is a medallion representing Our Lady of the Rosary.

To the left of the door is the two-storey bell-tower, topped by a pyramidal spire and pinnacles on each corner.

The interior of the church contains many valuable religious art, of which its gilded retables are its most prized. In addition, it is also decorated by several paint panels, that include the Resurrection, the Last Supper, the Ascension of Christ, and Four Evangelists, among others. Further, three silver-plate lamps and pulpit, mark the influence of the Baroque period on the temple.
