= Willem van der Haegen =

Flemish-born Azorean entrepreneur, explorer, and colonizer

- Guilherme da Silveira
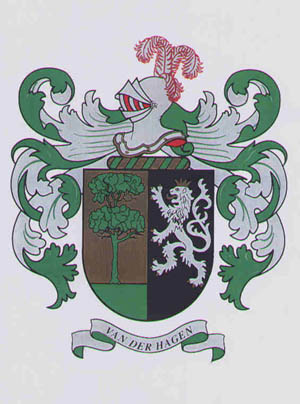
- The coat of arms used by the Silveira Family, descendants of Willem.

Personal details
- Born: 1430 County of Flanders, Burgundian Netherlands
- Died: 1507/9 Topo, São Jorge, Azores
- Resting place: Solar dos Tiagos

D. Willem van der Haegen (1430; County of Flanders – 21 December 1507/9; São Jorge, Azores), or Willem De Kersemakere, known in Portuguese as Guilherme da Silveira, or Guilherme Casmaca, was a Flemish-born Azorean entrepreneur, explorer, and colonizer. He was a pioneer colonizer in Azorean history and his descendants formed part of the original Azorean nobility.

== Colonization of the Azores ==
As part of his inheritance, King Edward of Portugal bequeathed the islands of the Azores to his brother, the Infante D. Henriques (Henry the Navigator), in 1433. This was subsequently left to Henry's nephew and adopted son, Infante D. Fernando, in addition to Henry's title as Grand Master of the Order of Christ. A grant was made by the Infante to his aunt, D. Isabella of Portugal (Edward and Henry's sister), the Duchess of Burgundy, in the Low Countries. For many of the Flemish who were recuperating from the Hundred Years' War, this grant offered an opportunity of alleviating their suffering.

Willem, a wealthy Flemish merchant who traded with the Portuguese, was invited by Joost de Hurtere (for four-years Captain-General of the island of Faial) to settle the island with him, in an archipelago that was becoming known as a New Flanders (or the Flemish Islands). Consequently, in 1470, with his wife, Marguerite, and at his own expense, he offloaded two ships carrying his extended family, slaves and professionals of various services, to begin what was characterised as a "second-wave" of immigration to the island (the first having been pioneered by de Hurtere in the 1460s). Willem, by his virtues and distinguished personality, became popular on the island. But, sensing a level of bad faith on the part of de Hurtere and a growing rivalry, he abandoned his holdings on Faial, to settle in Quatro Ribeiras, on the island of Terceira. He began to cultivate wheat and gather woad plants for export (specifically Isatis tinctoria which was also produced in the Picardy and Normandy Regions of France until that time). These plants, along with other species, were essential in the production of many of the dyes popular with mercantile classes. Most islands in the archipelago were populated, and the plants commercialized by the landed gentry for their exportable nature; early settlements were founded on the basis of agricultural and dye-based exports, such as woad. Willem's colonies were no exception.

On a trip to Lisbon he encountered D. Maria de Vilhena (widow of D. Fernão Teles de Meneses, the Donatary of the islands of Flores and Corvo, then administratively one fiefdom) and his son Rui Teles. After some negotiation, D. Maria would cede the rights to the exploration of the islands to Willem, in exchange for monthly payments. Around 1478, he settled in Ribeira da Cruz, where he built homes, developed agriculture (primarily wheat), collected more woad species for export, and explored for tin, silver or other minerals (under the assumption that the islands were part of the mythic Ilhas Cassterides, the islands of silver and tin). Owing to the island's isolation and difficulties in communication his crops became difficult to export. After several years, he decided to leave the island and return to Terceira. But his return was brief; after seven years he left Quatro Ribeiras and settled in the area of Topo, São Jorge Island, effectively establishing the community with other Flemish citizens. He died there on December 21, 1507/09, and was buried in the chapel-annex of the Solar dos Tiagos, in the villa of Topo, today in ruins.

== Personal life ==
=== Marriage and issue ===
He married Marguerite (née Zabeau or de Savoie) probably in Bruges, Flanders, (at times referred to by Frutuoso as Margarida da Sabuya, others would refer to Margarida da Sabina, Zambuja, Sabuia or Margarethe Sabuio) and would father eight children which would all integrate into the communities of the Central Group of islands:

- Margaretha van der Haegen or Margarida da Silveira (Bruges, 1452 – Flamengos, 1529); married to the Flemish nobleman Josse van Aertrycke (1451–1546) of the van Aertrycke family of Tillegem. They were married in the parish of Flamengos, Faial, and were the ancestors of the family Silveira Ramos of Portugal, currently headed by Ricardo de Faria Blanc da Silveira Ramos de Camarate Silveira;
- Jan van der Haegen or João da Silveira (Bruges, 1456 – Terceira, 1481), married Guiomar Borges Abarca on Terceira;
- Joris van der Haegen or Jorge da Silveira (Bruges, 1458 – death unknown);
- Catharina van der Haegen or Catarina da Silveira (Bruges, 1462 – death unknown), married the captain-major Jorge Gomes de Ávila in 1484 on Graciosa;
- Louise van der Haegen or Luzia da Silveira (Bruges, 1464 – Topo, 1548), married André Fernandes Villalobos around 1485 in the villa of Topo, São Jorge;
- Anna van der Haegen or Ana da Silveira (Bruges, 1466 – Goa, Portuguese India, 1549), married to Tristão Martins Pereira in Goa;
- Maria van der Haegen or Maria da Silveira (Bruges, 1468 – Faial, 1545), married to João Pires de Matos in 1497 on Faial;
- Frans De Kersemakere or Francisco Casmaca (Faial, 1499 – Faial, 1595), married to Isabella De Hurtere in 1524 on Faial, a granddaughter of Joost De Hurtere.

=== Descendants ===
The Flemish surname van der Haegen comes from the word Haag, which means hedge, and is translated into Portuguese as Silveira. In general, the families with the surname Silveira descend from the Fleming Willem, although there is a branch of Silveiras on the island of Graciosa that are direct descendants of continental Portuguese families. By his virtue and personality, he was able to found settlements that eventually developed into important communities in the Azores. His descendants, using the adopted name Silveira, would continue his work on the islands and within the Portuguese empire (to a lesser extent). The name Silveira was adopted by Willem's descendants in the Azores, from the literal translation to the Portuguese of the Dutch Haag or Haeg meaning "bush", "hedge" or "scrub", which is silveira in the Portuguese. His family lineage is separate from the Silveiras of continental Portugal which also inhabited some settlements in the Azores. Willem's children obtained from King John II of Portugal, confirmation of family heraldry (used in Flanders) for their use in the archipelago.

== Possible origins ==
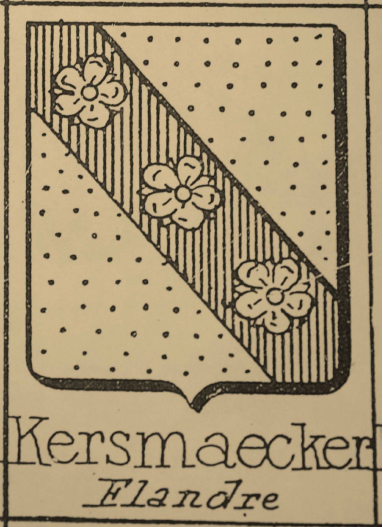
Coat of Arms originally used by the De Keersmaeker family in Flanders.

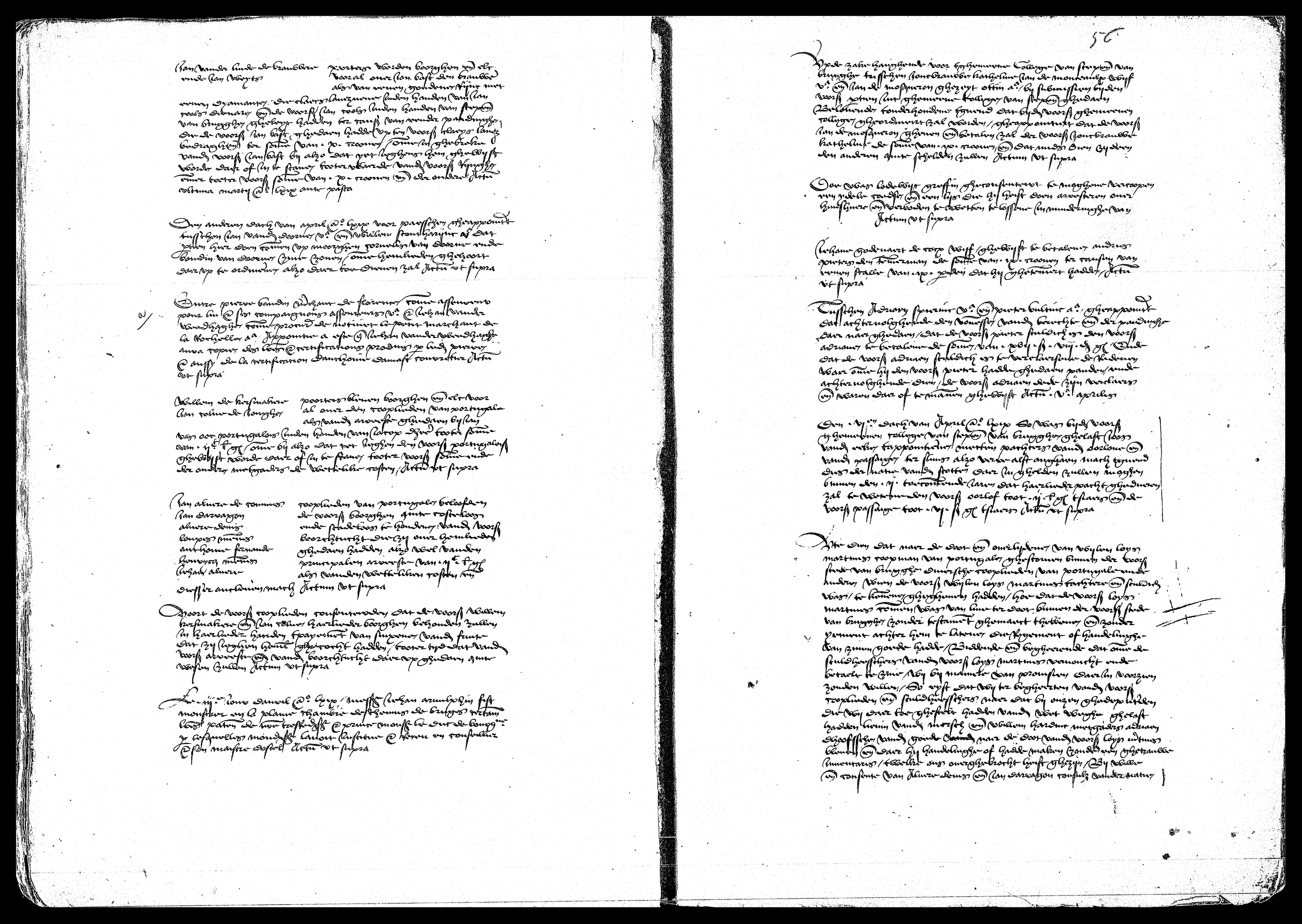
Civil sentence in the archives of Bruges detailing Willem's commercial relations with Portuguese merchants.

In 2006, in his article 'Les Flamads au Portugal au XV Siècle', the French historian Jacques Paviot wrote about the existence of a civil sentence in the archives of Bruges, written in medieval dialects of French and Dutch, which details the commercial relations of an individual named Willem De Kersemakere with various Portuguese merchants, including Lopo Mendes.

According to Paviot and to further research published in 2011 by the Belgian genealogist André L. Fr. Claeys, this document, in comparison to the will of Willem van der Haegen's wife, Magarida de Sabuya, dated from 14 September 1510 and registered by the notary André Fernandes (in which Willem is referred to as Guilherme Casmaca), concluded that the real name of the colonizer until then known as Willem van der Haegen was in fact Willem De Kersemakere.

Claeys argues that the reason why De Kersemakere was known as Willem van der Haegen is that he must have been first married in Bruges to a lady named Van der Haegen (unknown first name, born around 1432, date of marriage unknown, date of death before 1469). The conclusion is that on the Azores, according to Portuguese tradition, Willem's children from this first marriage must have chosen the surname of their mother van der Haegen or da Silveira, but without their father's family name "Casmaca", as it is also the Portuguese custom.

Furthermore, Claeys remarks that the chroniclers and genealogists of Azorean history based their writings on documents of the XVIth and XVIIth centuries, several generations after Willem's lifetime, maintaining the surname da Silveira for all the children of the first marriage and even for Willem himself. This would probably mean, in Claeys' conclusion, that the first seven children are not from Margarida de Sabuya, and thus retain their mother's name (in Bruges, they were probably named De Kersemakere), while Francisco, the youngest, was always called Casmaca. Claeys' also claims that, according to the Flemish and Portuguese customs, men never receive the surname of their wives, thus, the denomination "Willem van der Haegen" would be incorrect.

In addition to Paviot and Claeys, several authors throughout the centuries have referred to Willem as Guilherme Casmaca or Cosmacra (a possible linguistical corruption of Kersemakere), with the earliest attestation, besides the will of his wife, being a description of his life and family by Gaspar Frutuoso written in the years 1586–1590, in chapter 36 of the manuscript Saudades da Terra. Likewise, in a contemporary account to Willem's lifetime, Valentim Fernandes refers to him as 'Guylelmo Hersmacher' in his Latin manuscript 'Descripcam de Cepta por sua Costa de Mauritania e Ethiopia' published in 1506.

Paviot speculates that De Kersemakere may originate from the Dutch word Kaarsenmaker (candle maker), while Jorge Forjaz, Pedro da Silveira and José Guilherme Reis Leite speculate that Casmaca may originate from the Dutch word Kaasmaker or Kasmach (cheese maker), the last two also state that this may be the origin of Flemish cheese tradition on the São Jorge island. Moreover, Eduardo de Campos de Castro de Azevedo affirms that he colonizer known as Guilherme da Silveira was actually from Maastricht, which previously belonged to the Duchy of Brabant, where there was never any family by the name Vandraga/Van der Haegen.

Willem van der Haegen's parentage is uncertain; however, he might have been a member of the 'De Keersmaeker' patrician family.

James H. Guill, in his book 'A history of the Azores Islands, Vol. 5, p. 140', claims that Willem's wife, Margarida, was in fact an illegitimate daughter of Amadeus VIII, Duke of Savoy and that her husband was an illegitimate grandson of John the Fearless, likely through the latter's bastard son, John, Bishop of Cambrai, although, his allegations are heavily contested by Claeys, because Guill never cites any sources for this information, and never consulted the archives of Bruges, or other Flemish sources, always referring to Willem as 'Van der Haegen', and never 'Casmaca' or 'De Kersemakere'. Instead, Claeys argues that Margarida was probably born 'Marguerite Zabeau' from the petty nobility of Wallonia, observing that since before 1322 the surname Zabeau is found on the regions of Liège, Luxembourg (Belgium) and Ardennes (with variants such as Sabau, Sabia, Sabiau). Claeys also notes that even if Margarida was in fact a Savoy, she was probably the daughter of other members of this family who settled in Wallonia, as he claims to have found two coats of arms of lineages named Savoi or Savoye (Jehan de Savoye, 1444). Also in the same region, there are records of Aimé, Count of Savoy (record of 23 December 1304, cartularum of 1 September 1316) and Jacop van Savoye, Count of Romand and Saint-Pol (record of 8 April 1484).

It is very likely that Guill based his allegations on the claim made by Gaspar Frutuoso that Willem was the grandson of a Count of Flanders. However, the noble origin of Van der Haeghen has been disputed by various posterior authors. The first of which, Diogos das Chagas, claimed in his manuscript 'Espelho Cristalino' from 1646 that there were two people named Silveira: "João de Silveyra, a very important man and great merchant (or cunning merchant)", to whom Joost de Hurtere (Joz de Utra) made many promises if he would agree to settle on the Azores, and another "Guilherme de Silveyra of the Silveyras of Brandath" who traveled to Flores and then São Jorge. In regards to the latter, das Chagas writes that the name Brandath is a linguistical corruption of Vandraga.

== See also ==
- Josse van Huerter
- Jácome de Bruges
- Josse van Aertrycke
