= Santo Antão (Calheta) =

- Civil parish
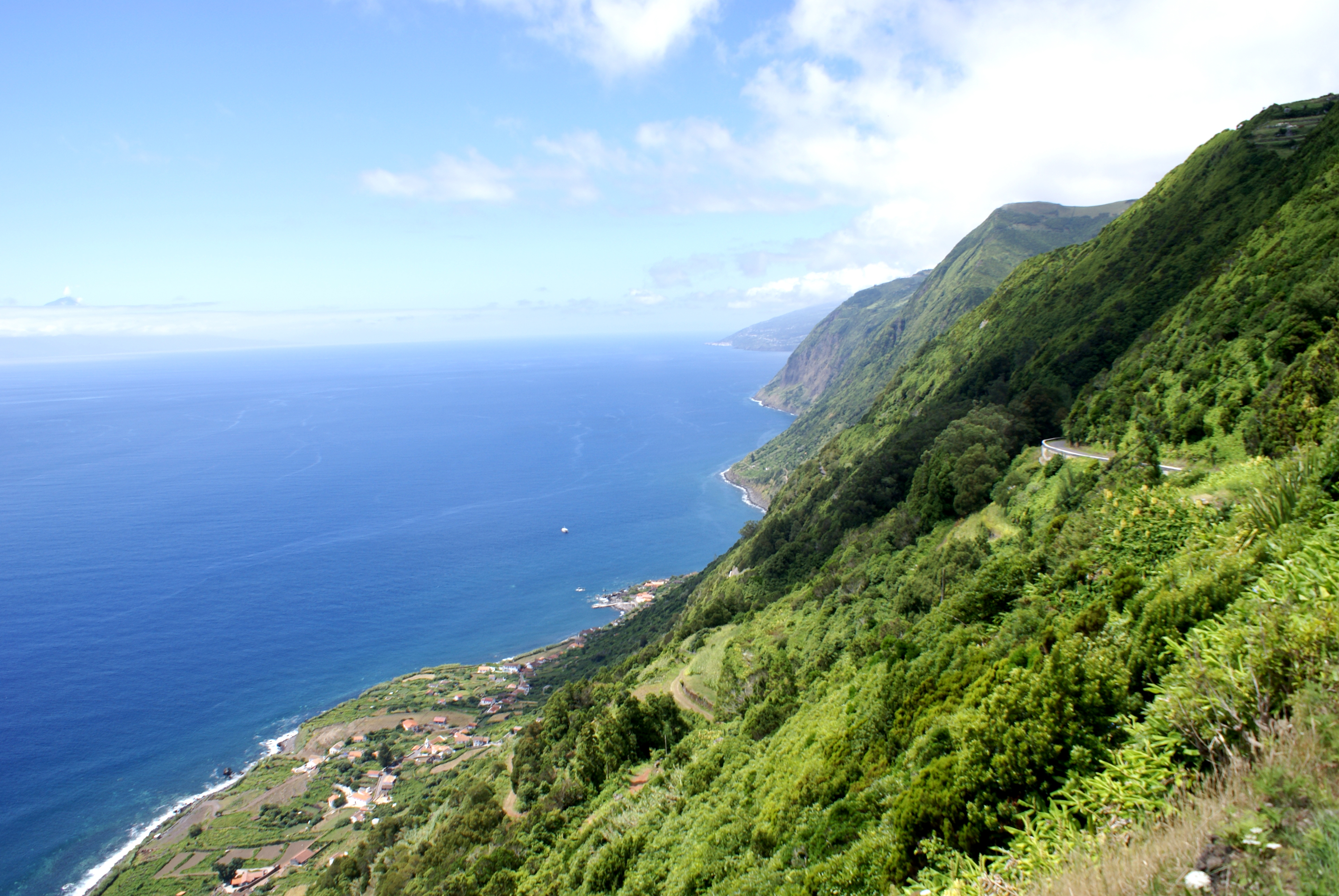
- Southern coast of the civil parish of Santo Antão, showing the Fajã de São João

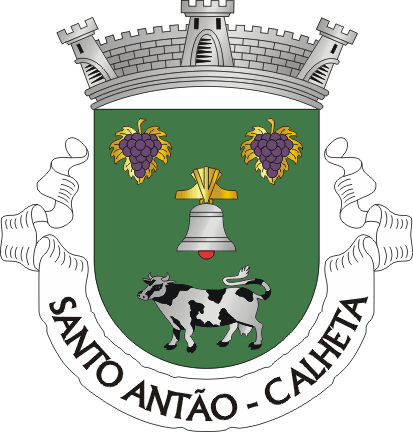
- Coat of arms

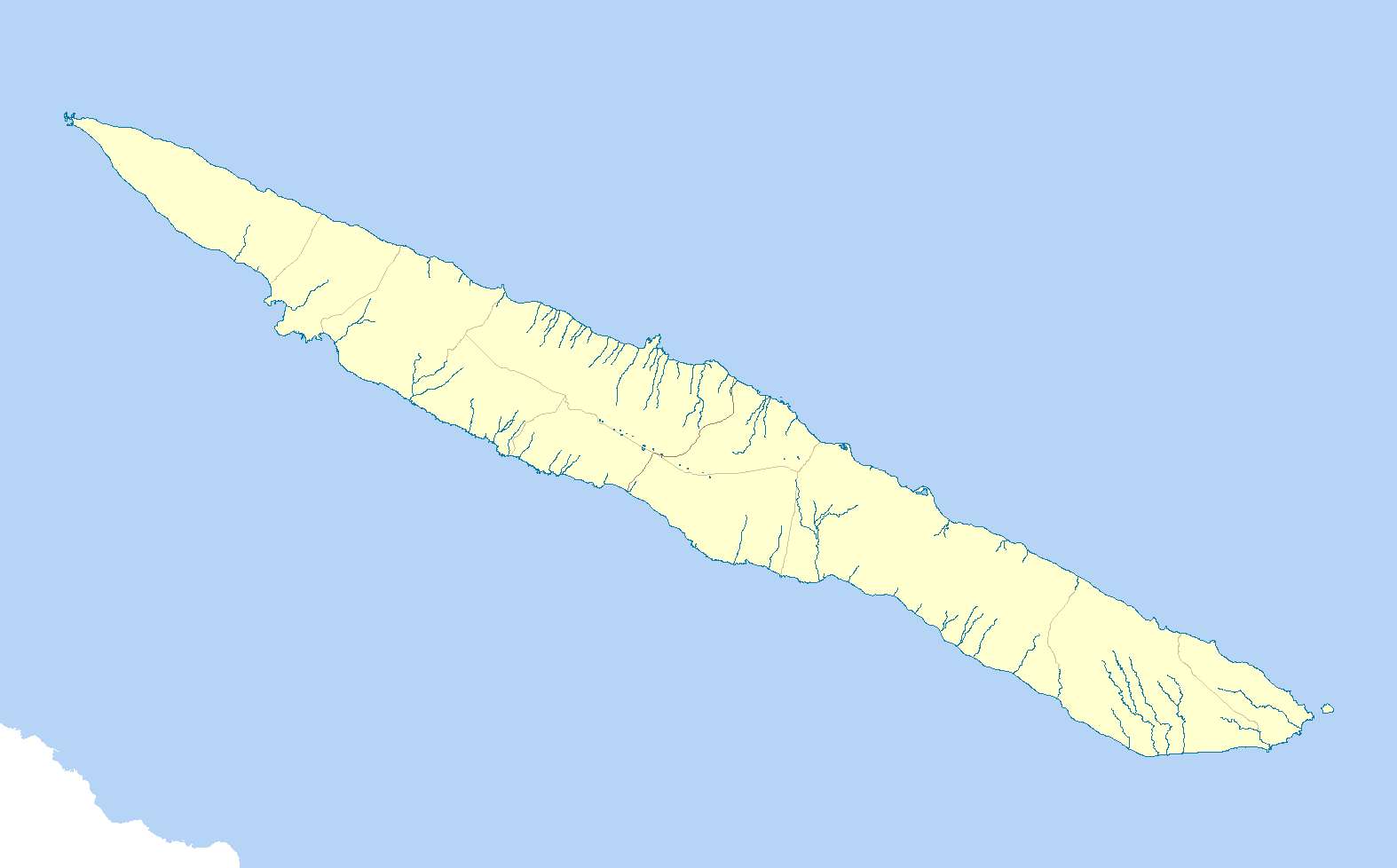
- Location in the Azores Santo Antão (São Jorge)
- Coordinates: 38°32′37″N 27°49′8″W
- Country: Portugal
- Auton. region: Azores
- Island: São Jorge
- Municipality: Calheta
- Established: Settlement: 6 June 1889

Area
  - Total: 32.34 km^{2} (12.49 sq mi)
- Elevation: 297 m (974 ft)

Population (2011)
  - Total: 745
  - Density: 23.0/km^{2} (59.7/sq mi)
- Time zone: UTC−01:00 (AZOT)
  - Summer (DST): UTC+00:00 (AZOST)
- Postal code: 9875-067
- Area code: 292
- Patron: Santo Antão
- Website: http://jf-santoantao.com/

Santo Antão is a freguesia ("civil parish") in the eastern half of the municipality of Calheta, that extends from northern to southern coast of the island of São Jorge in the Azores. The population in 2011 was 745, in an area of 32.34 km^{2}. It contains the localities Fajã de São João, São Tomé, Canada de São Tomé, Tronqueiras, Lameiro, Cruzal, Caminho de Cima, Caminho Chão, Caminho de Pedra, Santo Antão and Santa Rosa.
