= List of freguesias of Portugal: R =

The freguesias (civil parishes) of Portugal are listed in by municipality according to the following format:

- concelho
  - freguesias

== Redondo ==
- Montoito
- Redondo

== Reguengos de Monsaraz ==
- Campinho
- Campo
- Corval
- Monsaraz
- Reguengos de Monsaraz

== Resende ==
- Anreade
- Barrô
- Cárquere
- Feirão
- Felgueiras
- Freigil
- Miomães
- Ovadas
- Panchorra
- Paus
- Resende
- São Cipriano
- São João de Fontoura
- São Martinho de Mouros
- São Romão de Aregos

== Ribeira Brava (Madeira) ==
- Campanário
- Ribeira Brava
- Serra de Água
- Tabua

== Ribeira de Pena ==
- Alvadia
- Canedo
- Cerva
- Limões
- Ribeira de Pena (Salvador)
- Santa Marinha
- Santo Aleixo de Além-Tâmega

== Ribeira Grande (Azores) ==
- Calhetas
- Conceição
- Fenais da Ajuda
- Lomba da Maia
- Lomba de São Pedro
- Maia
- Matriz
- Pico da Pedra
- Porto Formoso
- Rabo de Peixe
- Ribeira Seca
- Ribeirinha
- Santa Bárbara
- São Brás

== Rio Maior ==
- Alcobertas
- Arrouquelas
- Arruda dos Pisões
- Asseiceira
- Assentiz
- Azambujeira
- Fráguas
- Malaqueijo
- Marmeleira
- Outeiro da Cortiçada
- Ribeira de São João
- Rio Maior
- São João da Ribeira
- São Sebastião
