= Arruda (disambiguation) =

Arruda is a surname.

Arruda also may refer to:

== Places ==
- Arruda DOC, a Portuguese wine region
- Arruda dos Vinhos, a Portuguese municipality in Lisbon
- Arruda dos Pisões, a parish in Rio Maior, Portugal
- Estádio do Arruda, a multi-purpose stadium in Recife, Brazil

== Other uses ==
- Arruda–Boyce model, in continuum mechanics
- Ruta graveolens, herb

== See also ==
- Ribeirão Arrudas (Portuguese: Arrudas Brook), Minas Gerais, Brazil; a stream
- Jebel Aruda (Arabic: Aruda Hill), an Uruk period archaeological site in Mesopotamia
