= Ribeira Grande City Hall =

Ribeiria Grande City Hall
- Paços do Concelho de Ribeira Grande
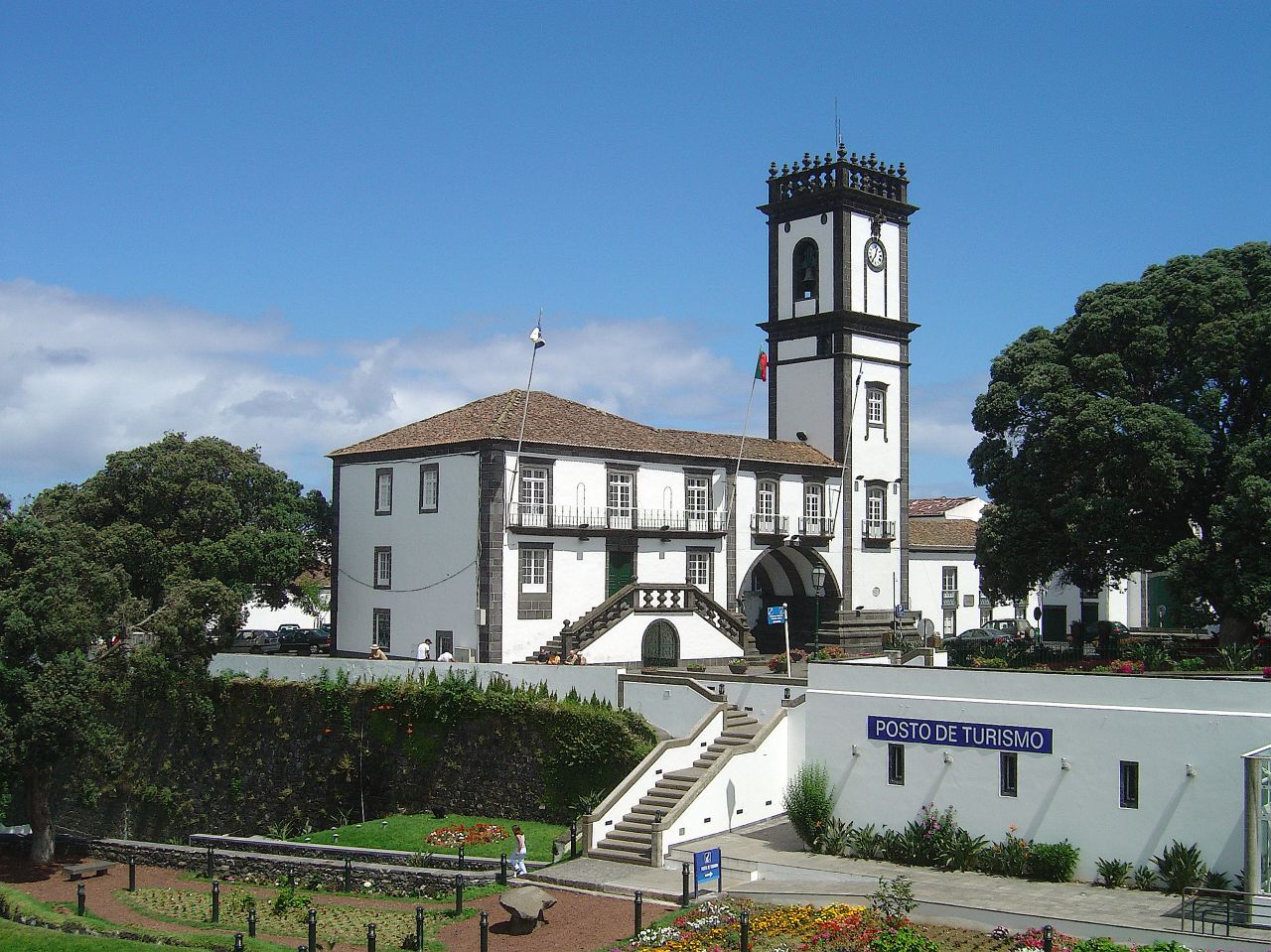
- A view of the municipal palace alongside the Ribeira Grande river and municipal square
- Interactive map of the Ribeiria Grande City Hall area

General information
- Type: City Hall
- Architectural style: Medieval
- Location: Matriz, Portugal
- Coordinates: 37.8227683°N 25.5222314°W
- Opened: 4 August 1507
- Owner: Portuguese Republic

Technical details
- Material: Masonry stone

The Ribeira Grande City Hall (Portuguese: Paços do Concelho de Ribeira Grande) is a medieval structure constructed to house the municipal council/authority, situated in the civil parish of Matriz, municipality of Ribeira Grande, on the Portuguese archipelago of the Azores.

== History ==
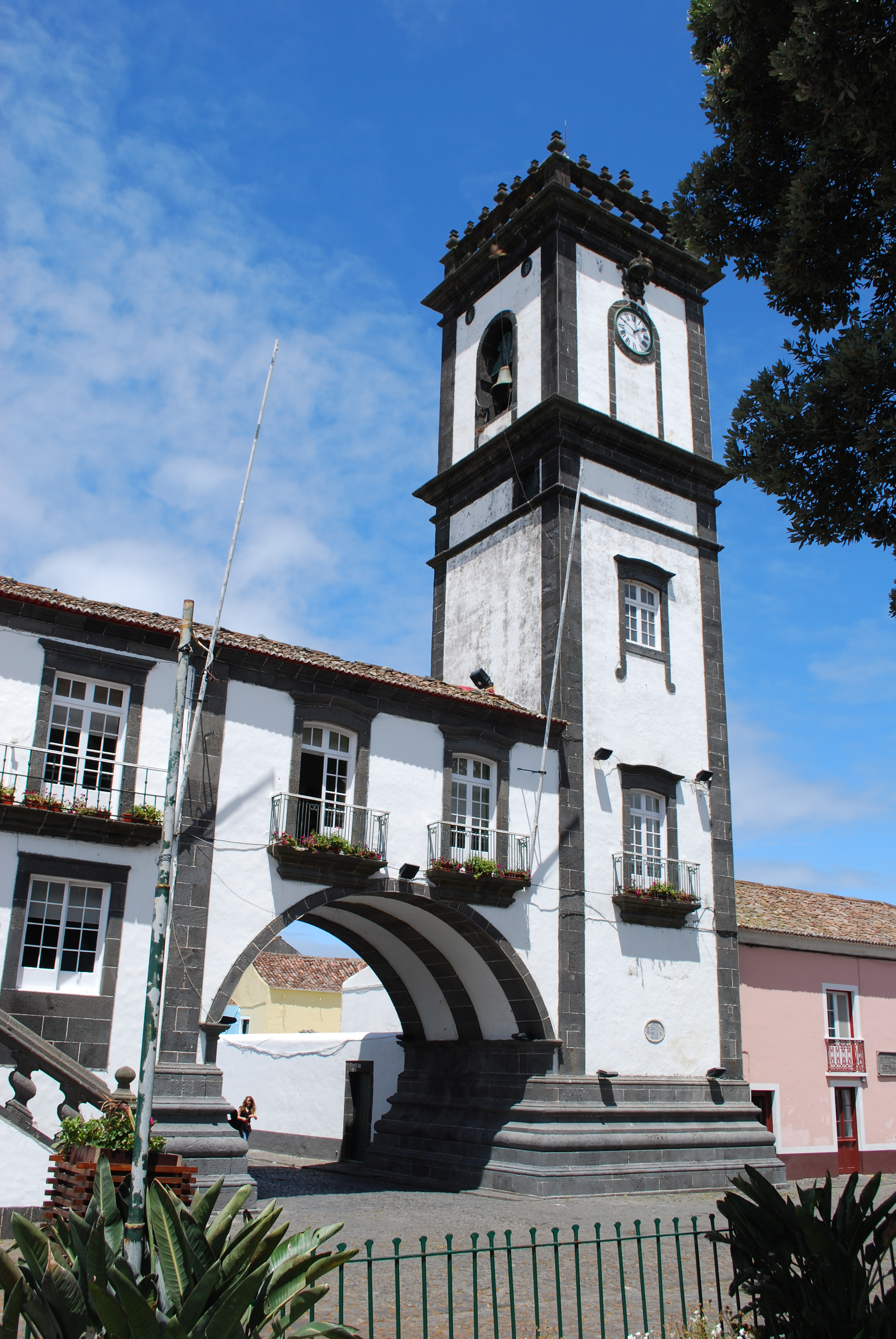
The clocktower of the municipal palace/hall

The first political authority within the region was founded on 4 August 1507, with the first official minutes conserved in the municipal archives dating to 5 January 1555.

Between 1563 and 1564, there was a combined seismic and volcanological event resulting in complete destruction to the community and the original municipal hall.

Work on a municipal building began in the 17th century and included a subterranean jail with successive floors. By 17 February 1796, there was a decision to construct two arches over the Rua das Espigas and, above them, build rooms for prison officers. The representatives also left space aside, in the most convenient place, to build a chapel for masses for the prisoners. At the same time, it was decided to construct a tower and install a clock. In this sequence, a wing was constructed forming a passageway over the public accessway and a clock tower, to shelter the prison officers and his inmates, along with bells and municipal clock. Between 1860 and 1864, the public gardens were installed in front of the municipal hall.

By the 1930s, the interior of the building was remodeled, resulting in the construction of interior staircase, the placement of stained-glass window to illuminate the same, and the installation of the ceiling in the main hall. The ashlar azulejo tiles were installed in the main hall in 1936, by Jorge Rei Colaço.

In 2006, a detailed plan to safeguard the historic center of the city was instituted, that included the medieval municipal palace/hall.

== Architecture ==
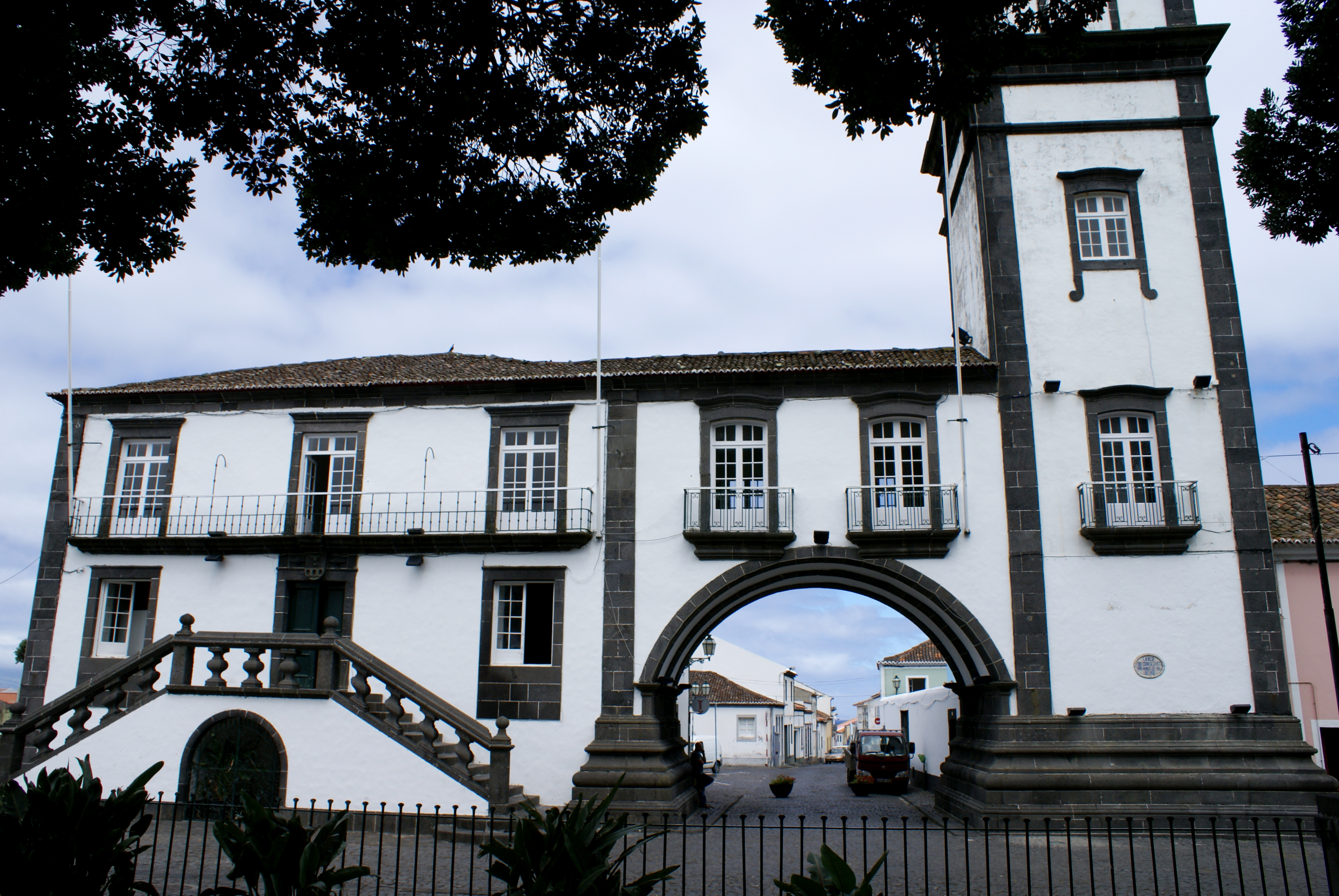
The three-story ex-libris of Ribeira Grande, with covered archway and clocktower

The municipal hall is situated in the city of Ribeira Grande, fronted by the gardens of the Praça Hintze Ribeiro (also known as the people's garden) and alongside the walls and grade of the Ribeira Grande river.

Immediately nearby are the Church of the Misericórdia, Church of the Holy Spirit and Church of Nossa Senhora da Estrela (the parochial church of Ribeira Grande) in the east and the Ribeiragrandense Theatre in the southwest.

The building is the ex-libris of the city, consisting of a three-story structure linked by archway to a right, lateral clocktower. The principal corp of the building is a rectangular plan with access by a symmetrical staircase that includes large balusters to the entrance, flanked by windows. The body is surmounted by three windows with verandas. Over the staircase is a tunnel-like passage that allows access to the subterranean floor, with an entranceway door surmounted by a lintel with the municipal coat-of-arms flanked by two diamond forms, linked to the top floor balcony console. On the facade are more contemporary windows, including rounded window (with flag and geometric motives), situated on upper left corner and window illuminating the staircase. The second, less profound, corp of the structure is situated on the right-hand side, dominated by the tower, and forming an arched "bridge". The ground floor is primarily substituted by a framed arch of grand dimensions that allows the passage of a road. On the principal facade of the upper floors are two windows with varanda and two with guillotine-style windows, while the rear have simple unframed windows.

Within the main hall of the building are azulejo tiles representing the watermills, the traditional Cavalhadas de São Pedro, feasts of the Holy Spirit, tea plantations, the former municipal coat-of-arms (dating to the constitutional monarchy) and Gaspar Frutuoso. In addition is the historic pillory, as well as a collection of photographs of Portuguese chiefs-of-staff, beginning with Queen Maria II.
