= Fenais =

Fenais may refer to the following places in Portugal:

- Fenais da Ajuda, civil parish in the municipality of Ribeira Grande
- Fenais da Luz, civil parish in the municipality of Ponta Delgada
