= Porto Formoso =

- Civil parish
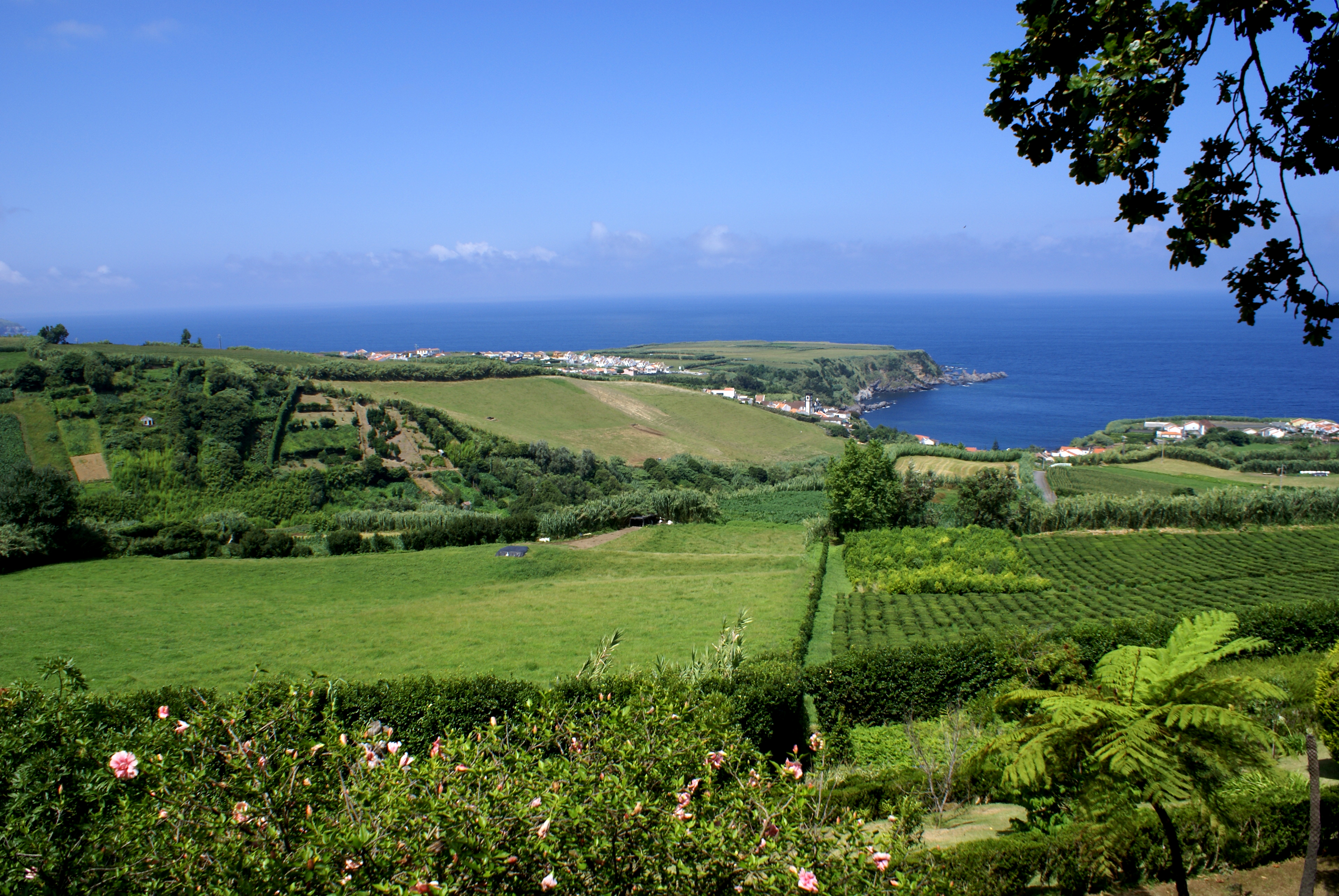
- The expanse of tea fields from the regional roadway looking towards the coastal community of Porto Formoso

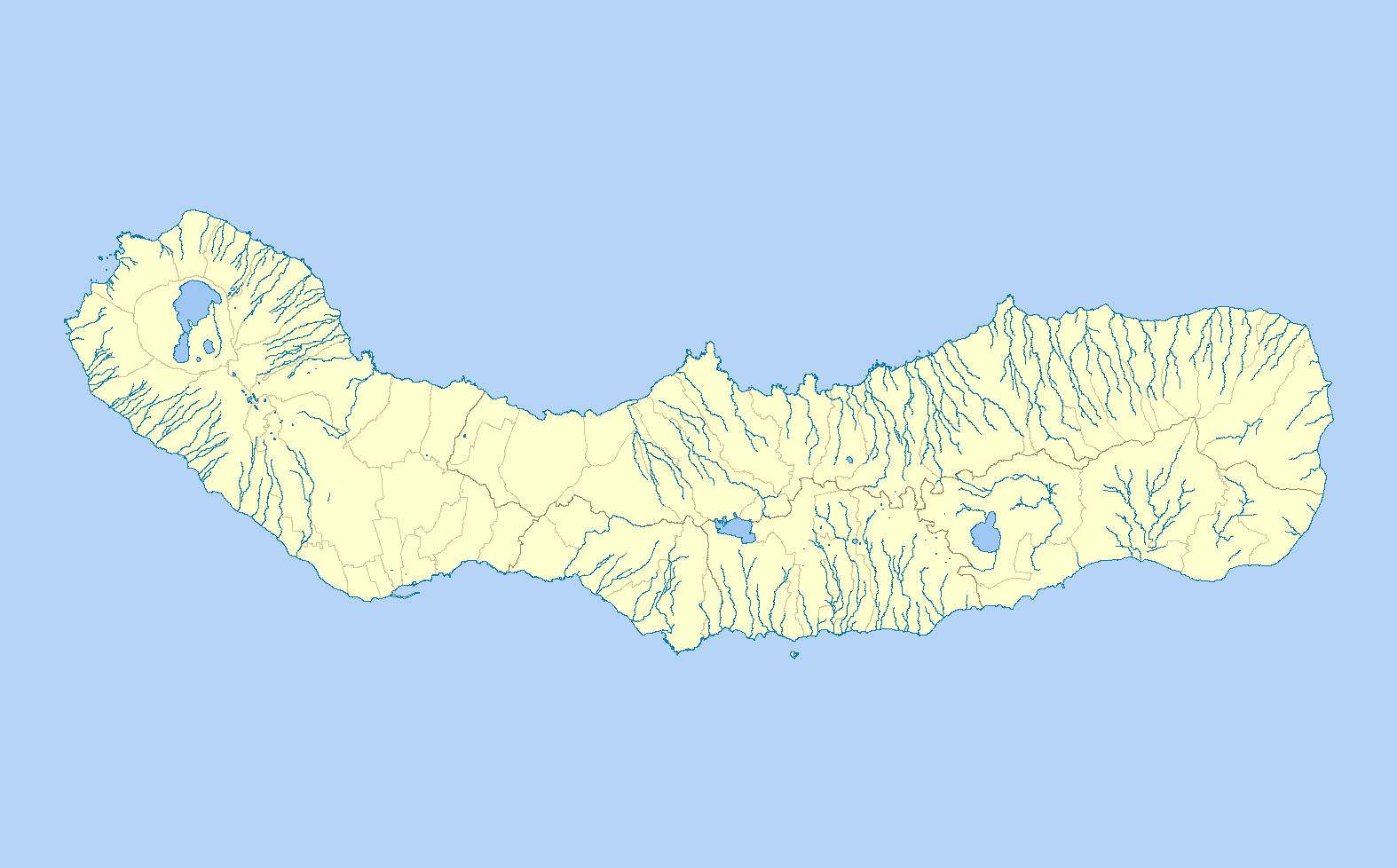
- Location in the Azores Porto Formoso (São Miguel)
- Coordinates: 37°49′19″N 25°25′32″W
- Country: Portugal
- Auton. region: Azores
- Island: São Miguel
- Municipality: Ribeira Grande
- Established: Parish: 2 June 1509

Area
  - Total: 12.79 km^{2} (4.94 sq mi)
- Elevation: 35 m (115 ft)

Population (2011)
  - Total: 1,265
  - Density: 98.91/km^{2} (256.2/sq mi)
- Time zone: UTC−01:00 (AZOT)
  - Summer (DST): UTC+00:00 (AZOST)
- Postal code: 9625-429
- Area code: 292
- Patron: Nossa Senhora da Graça

Porto Formoso is a civil parish in the municipality of Ribeira Grande in the Portuguese archipelago of the Azores. The population in 2011 was 1,265, in an area of 12.79 km^{2}.

== History ==
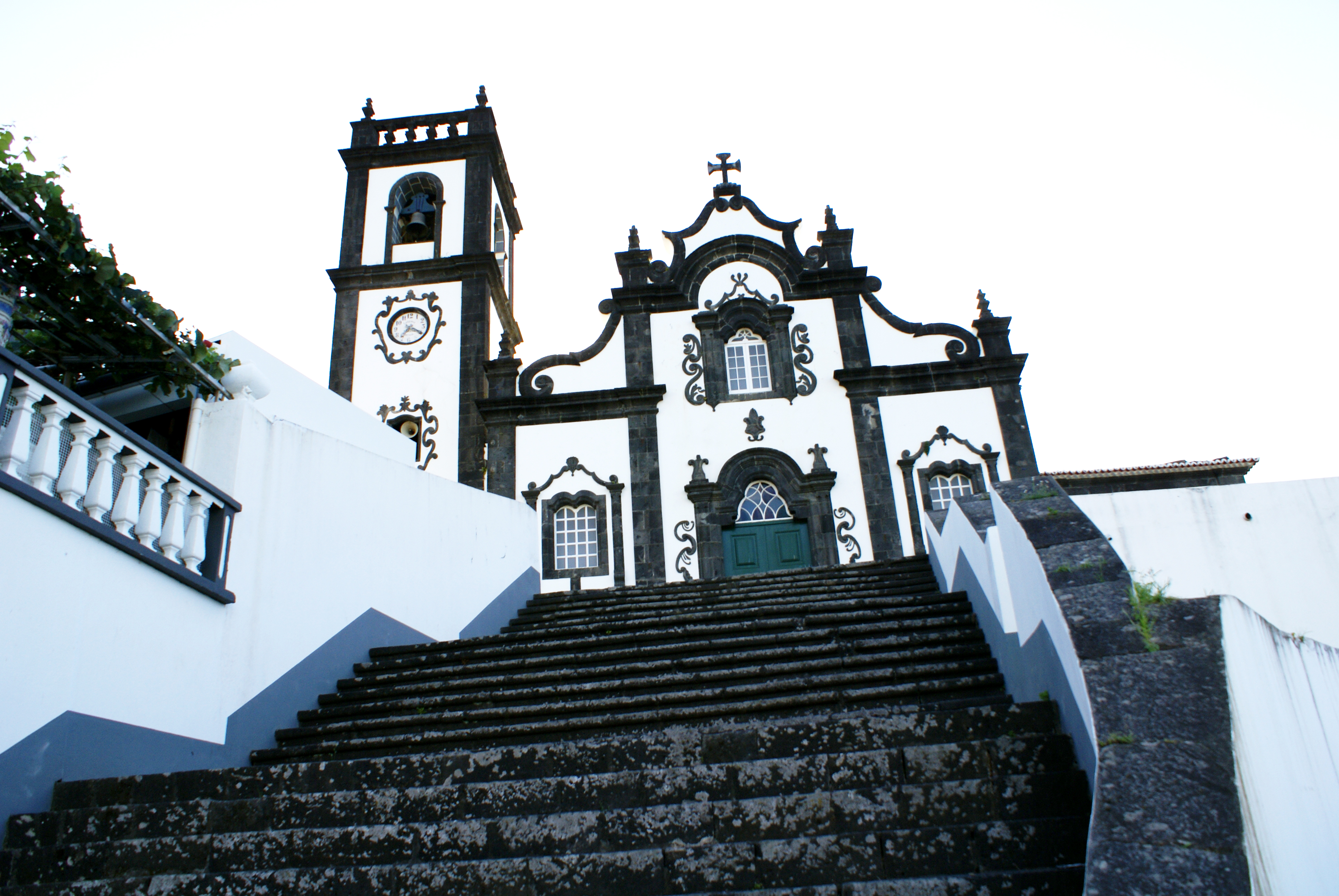
The ornate facada and staircase of the parochial Church of Nossa Senhora da Graça

The establishment of this civil parish remotes to the early part of the 16th century, as first recorded by Pedro Vaz Pacheco. On 2 June 1509, he ordered the construction of a Chapel of Bom Jesus, to serve his descendants. By the end of that century, the chapel had its own clergy, passing into a vicarage in 1568.

Gaspar Frutuoso (in Saudades da Terra), refers to the parish in these terms: "it makes a beautiful bay, and in the centre the locality of Porto Formoso, named for the things that exist there, it is clean and the best one in the north...".

The parochial church's patron is Nossa Senhora da Graça (Our Lady of Grace), and existed by the time that Pedro Vaz Pacheco ordered the erection of the Chapel of Bom Jesus (which included a crucifix and chanel to the Virgin) as a burial tomb for his descendants. The church was renovated throughout the centuries, becoming the simple facade of basalt rock and three interior naves.

In the civil parish, in the old roadway that connected Ribeira Grande to Furnas, is an obelisk (Obelisco da Ladeira da Velha) which was erected during the Liberal Wars (1829–34) to mark a long-forgotten engagement in the conflict, known as the Battle of Ladeira da Velha.

== Geography ==
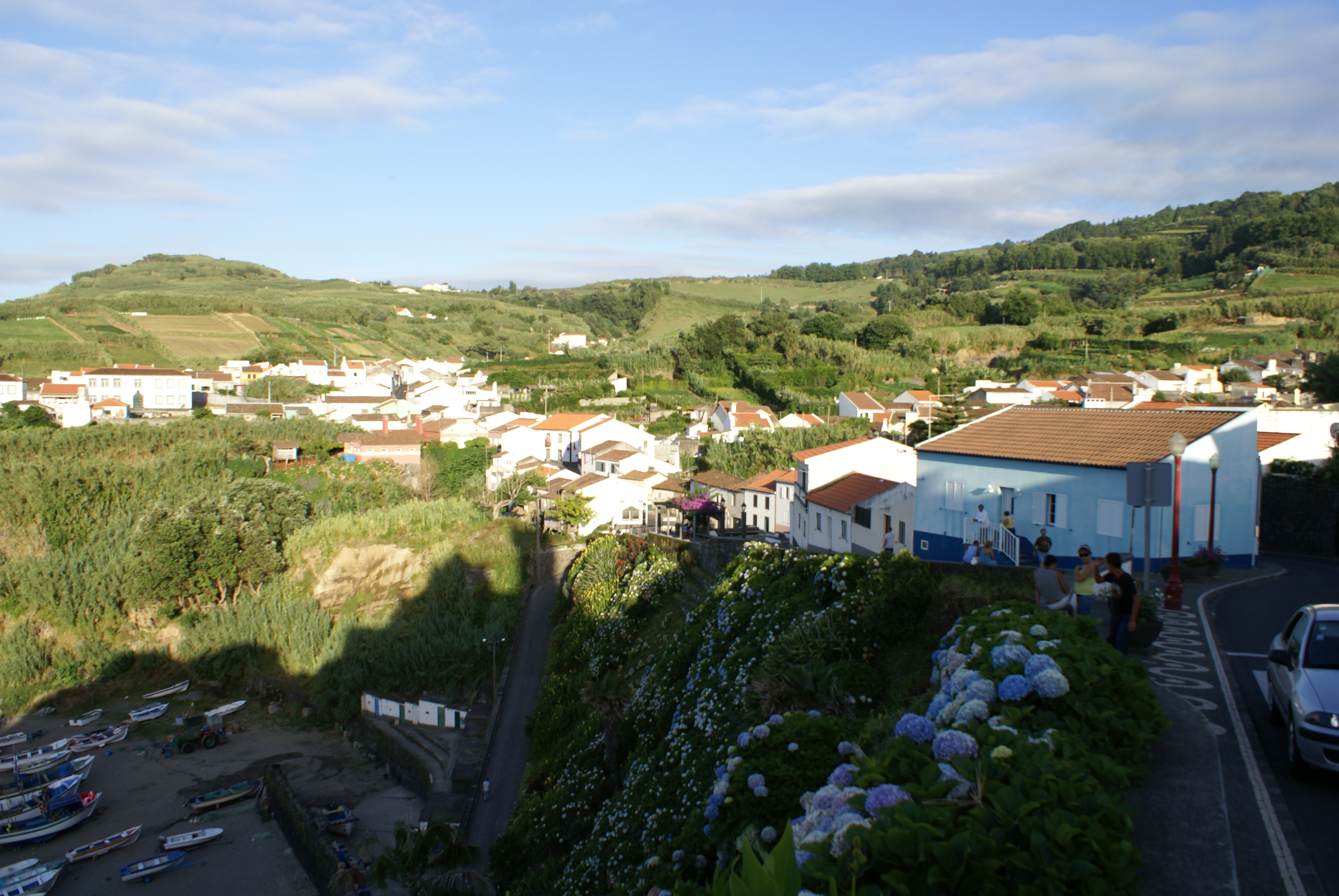
A partial view of the built-up area of the village of Praia Formoso, looking over into the fishing port/beach

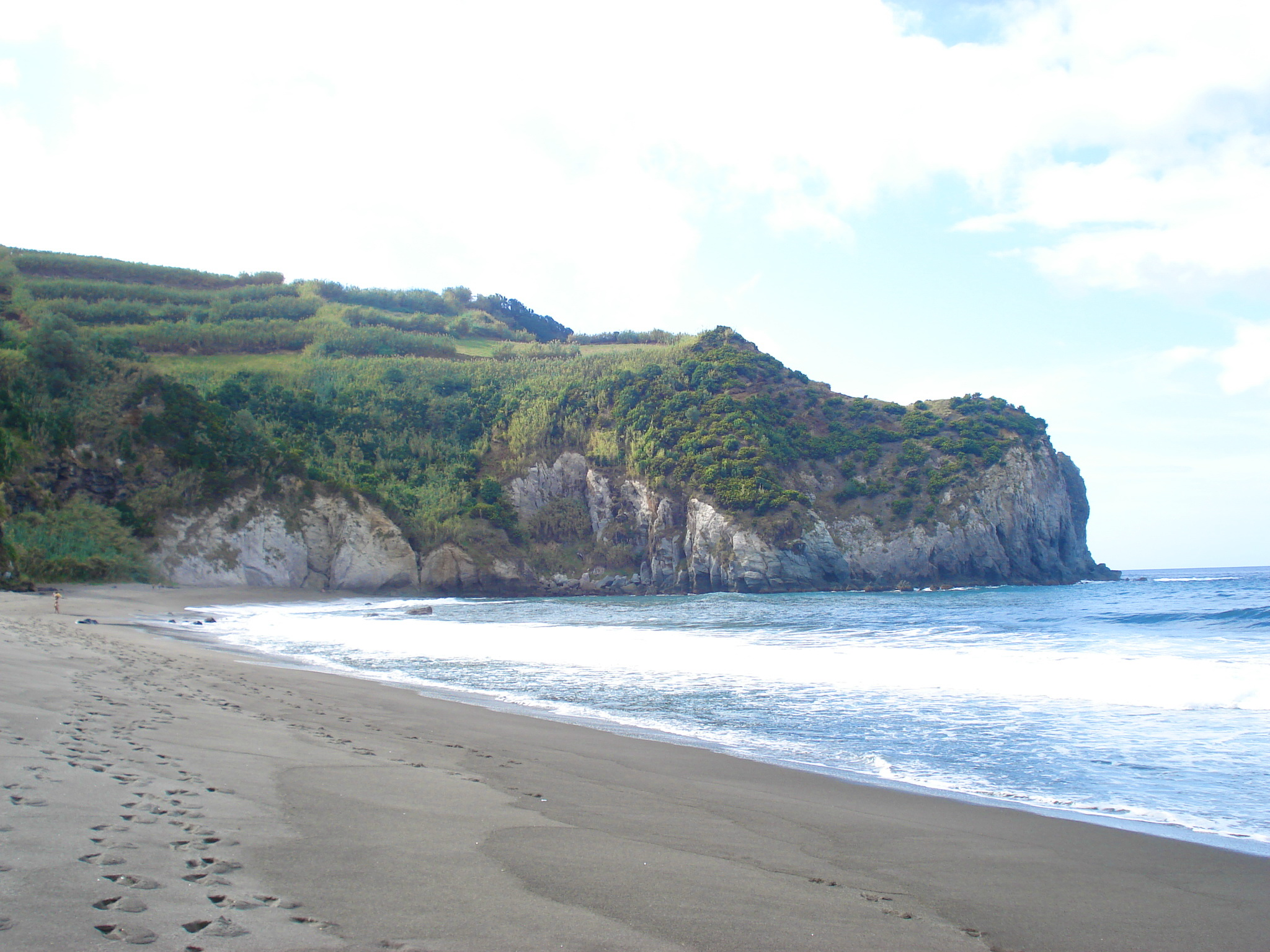
The beach and cliffs of the Praia dos Moinhos, one of the few white-sand beaches on the island of São Miguel

In the area of Praia dos Moinhos, a beach within an amphitheatre-like cliff face, the popular beach and locality developed from several watermills that were built along the ravine that flows into the ocean.

The ravine continues to empty into the ocean on this site, dividing the sandy beach, which is popular with tourists and local residents. Immediately near the beach is the Ladeira da Velha, where a natural mineral spring, rich in potassium, erupts from the coast with temperatures around 30 °C. A therme was constructed in a small house to provide repose for people who took therapeutic mineral treatments from these waters.

== Economy ==
The region is best known for the tea factories that exist in the vicinity of one another: the Fábrica de Chá Porto Formoso, within Porto Formoso, and the neighbouring Gorreana tea factory in the neighbouring parish of São Brás. The terrain in this parish is devoted to agriculture and as pasture-lands, but several tracts are dedicated to the cultivation of tea plants, owing to the areas micro-climate.

== Architecture ==
=== Religious ===
- Hermitage of Nossa Senhora do Carmo (Portuguese: Ermida de Nossa Senhora do Carmo)
- Church of Nossa Senhora da Graça (Portuguese: Igreja de Nossa Senhora da Graça)
