= Arruda =

Arruda is a surname of Portuguese origin. It is also considered a Portuguese Sephardic Jewish surname. The surname most likely is derived from a place where plants in the Rutaceae family, or "rue" were commonly found. More specifically this location was the Arruda valley or the city of Arruda dos Vinhos near Lisbon. In the Portuguese language, the word Arruda means "rue" and is derived from the Latin name of the plant ruta, or rutae. Originating in Europe, the name quickly spread to the Azores, and then progress to Brazil in the 17th century, where many New Christians (Jews forcibly converted to Christianity at the end of the 15th century) adopted the name. Variations of the surname include Arruda de and Arruda Sa.

== People ==
- Alan Arruda (born 1981), Brazilian footballer and coach
- Ana Margarida Arruda (born 1955), Portuguese historian and archaeologist
- Axel Rodrigues de Arruda (born 1970), Brazilian footballer commonly known as Axel
- Diogo de Arruda (before 1490–1531), Portuguese architect
- Ellen Arruda, American mechanical engineer
- Helton Arruda (born 1978), Brazilian footballer known as Helton
- Horacio Arruda (born 1960), Canadian doctor
- Kiʻilani Arruda (born 2002), American beauty pageant titleholder
- Manuel Arruda da Câmara (1752–1810), Portuguese cleric, physician, and botanist
- Marcelino Junior Lopes Arruda (born 1989), Brazilian footballer better known as Mazola
- Miguel Arruda (born 1984), Portuguese politician
- Sérgio Arruda, Brazilian diplomat
- Danielle Scott-Arruda (born 1972), American-Brazilian volleyball player
