= Conceição (Ribeira Grande) =

- Civil parish
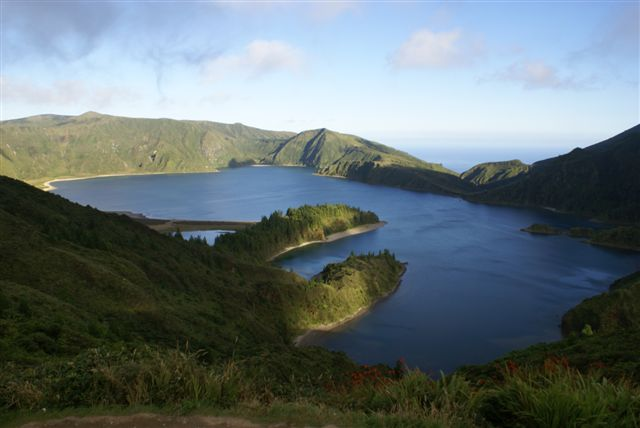
- The northern margin of Lagoa do Fogo (foreground), on the southern border of the parish

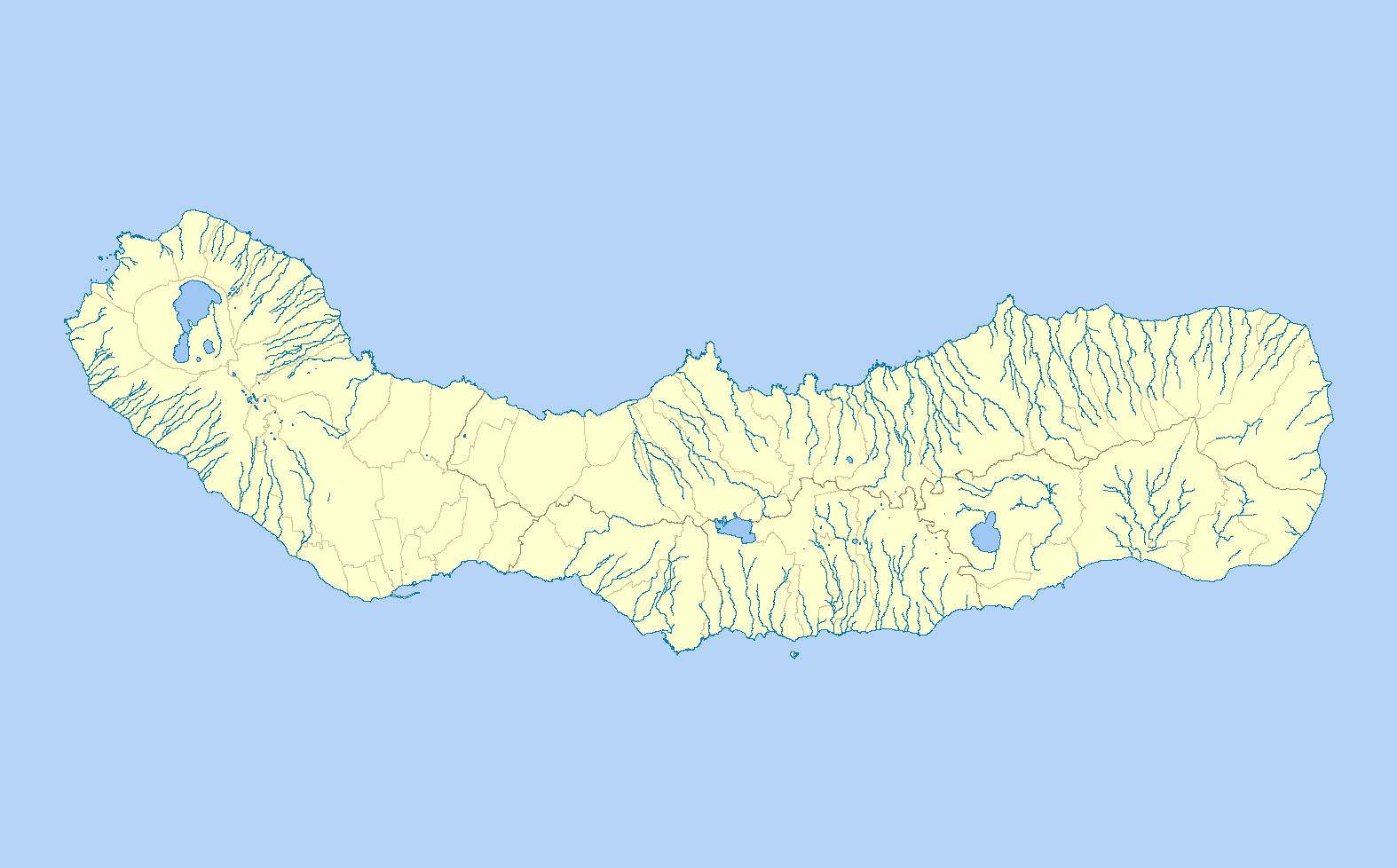
- Location in the Azores Conceição (São Miguel)
- Coordinates: 37°49′7″N 25°31′35″W
- Country: Portugal
- Auton. region: Azores
- Island: São Miguel
- Municipality: Ribeira Grande

Area
  - Total: 12.73 km^{2} (4.92 sq mi)
- Elevation: 28 m (92 ft)

Population (2011)
  - Total: 2,425
  - Density: 190.5/km^{2} (493.4/sq mi)
- Time zone: UTC−01:00 (AZOT)
  - Summer (DST): UTC+00:00 (AZOST)
- Postal code: 9600-538
- Area code: 292
- Patron: Nossa Senhora da Conceição
- Website: www.jfconceicao.ifreg.pt

Conceição is a freguesia ("civil parish") in the district of Ribeira Grande in the Azores. The population in 2011 was 2,425, in an area of 12.73 km². It is situated on the north coast of the island. Together with the parish Matriz, it forms the old core of the town Ribeira Grande. It contains the localities Caldeiras and Conceição.
