= Ribeirinha (Ribeira Grande) =

- Civil parish
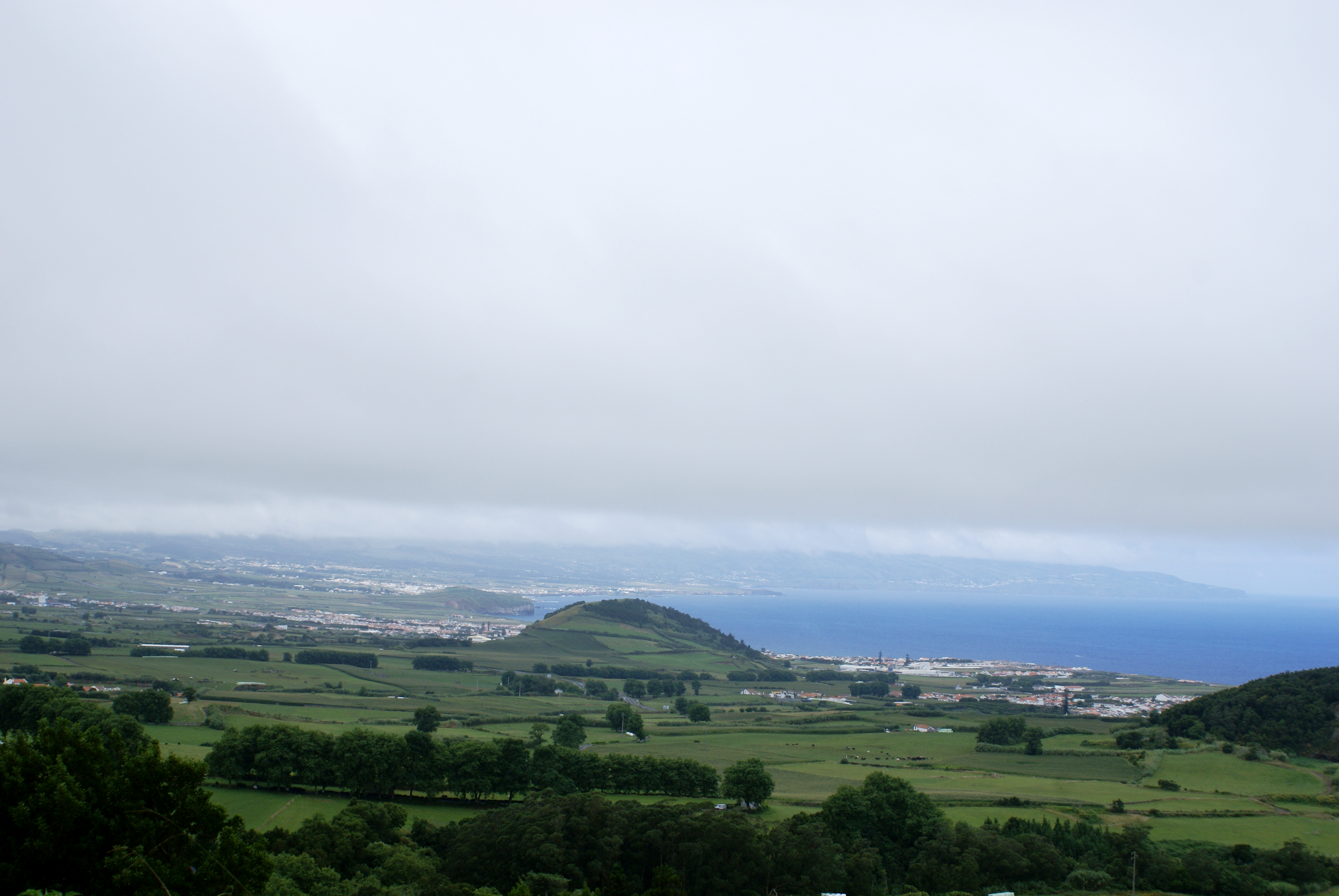
- The vista of Ribeirinha, showing the spatter cone of Pico da Multa (center) and Pico Mocho (right)

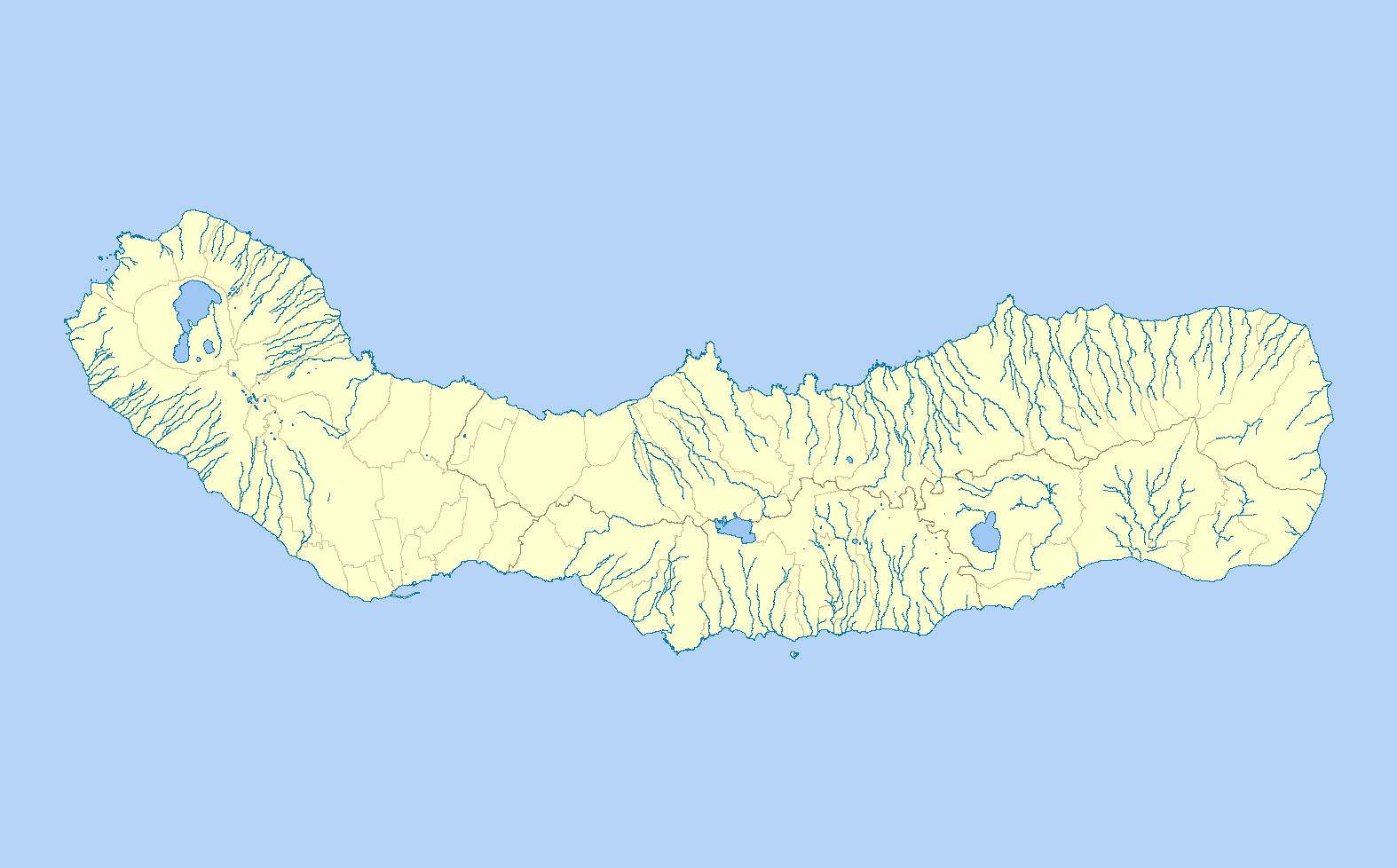
- Location in the Azores Ribeirinha (São Miguel)
- Coordinates: 37°49′31″N 25°29′23″W
- Country: Portugal
- Auton. region: Azores
- Island: São Miguel
- Municipality: Ribeira Grande
- Established: Settlement: fl. 1500; Parish: fl. 1600; Civil parish: 3 August 1948

Area
  - Total: 17.98 km^{2} (6.94 sq mi)
- Elevation: 109 m (358 ft)

Population (2011)
  - Total: 2,349
  - Density: 130.6/km^{2} (338.4/sq mi)
- Time zone: UTC−01:00 (AZOT)
  - Summer (DST): UTC+00:00 (AZOST)
- Postal code: 9600-323
- Area code: 296
- Patron: Santíssimo Salvador do Mundo (Jesus)

Ribeirinha is a parish in the district of Ribeira Grande in the Azores. The population in 2011 was 2,349, in an area of 17.98 km^{2}. It contains the localities Gramas, Lameiro, Ribeirinha, Santa Rosa and Santo António.
