= Sérgio Arruda =

Brazilian diplomat

Sérgio De Souza Fontes Arruda is a Brazilian diplomat, currently the Ambassador of Brazil in Malaysia.

== Biography ==
He was born in Rio de Janeiro, son of Archimedes de Andrade Arruda and Lea de Sousa Fontes Arruda. Married to Geo Alencar Arruda with who has two children and since the 25th of March 2009 he also became a grandfather after his grandson Joao Henrique was born, son of his firstborn daughter Mariana.

He received his law degree in 1966 from the National University of Rio de Janeiro (UNERJ - Universidade Nacional do Rio de Janeiro), and graduated in 1965 from the Brazilian diplomatic school Instituto Rio Branco. In 1983 he received the High Level degree in Diplomacy.

After becoming Second Secretary he started his diplomatic career abroad in Madrid in 1968. His first time as Ambassador was in 1995 in Kingston, Jamaica, and as General Consul in 2006 in Rotterdam.

== Professional Background ==
- Consul General in Rotterdam (2006–2008)
- Ambassador in Kingston and Nassau (2005-2001)
- Permanent Representative to the International Seabed Authority (1996–2001)
- Minister-Counsellor, Embassy in Beijing (1990–1993) and Permanent Mission to the United Nations in Vienna (1987–1990)
- Minister-Counsellor and Counsellor, Embassy in Luanda (1983–1987)
- First and Second Secretary, Embassy in Ottawa (1971–1974)
- Second Secretary, Embassy in Madrid (1968–1971)

== Other Professional Activities ==
- Chairman of the Administrative Board, Fundação Visconde de Cabo-Frio (2003–2006)
- Head of Office of the Minister of Culture (2001–2003)
- Director of the Brazilian Cooperation Agency in the Ministry of External Relations (1994–1995)
- Head of the Public Information Unit in the Ministry of External Relations (1978–1983)
- Assistant, Office of the Minister of External Relations (1974–1977)
