= Calhetas =

- Civil parish
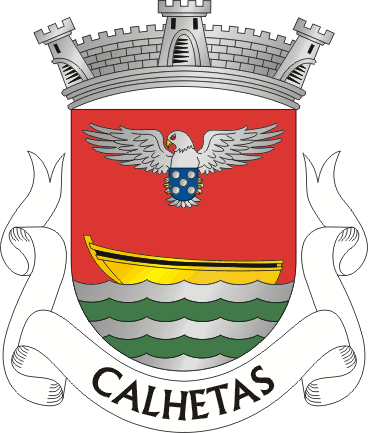
- Coat of arms

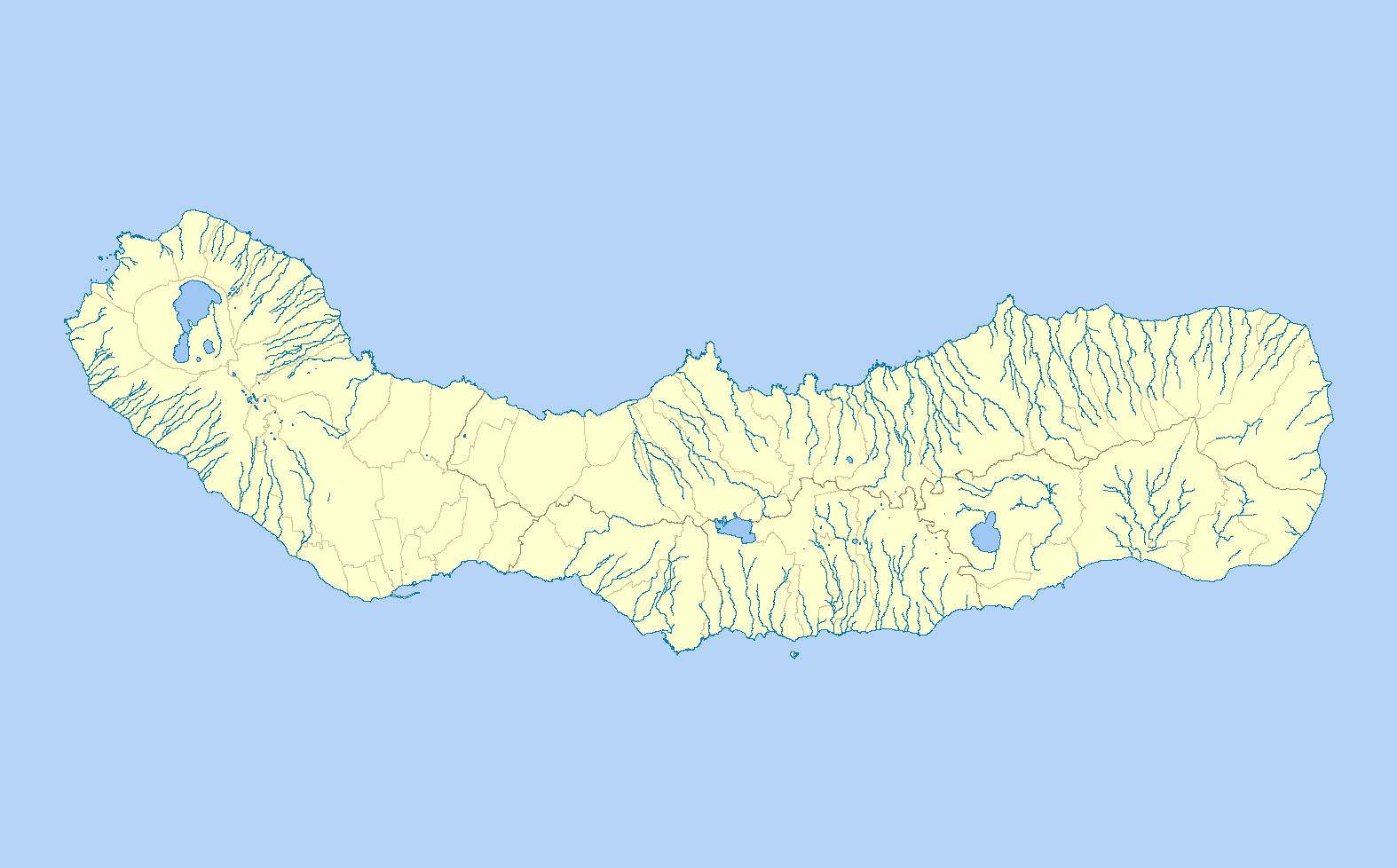
- Location in the Azores Calhetas (São Miguel)
- Coordinates: 37°49′14″N 25°36′28″W
- Country: Portugal
- Auton. region: Azores
- Island: São Miguel
- Municipality: Ribeira Grande

Area
  - Total: 4.70 km^{2} (1.81 sq mi)
- Elevation: 29 m (95 ft)

Population (2011)
  - Total: 988
  - Density: 210/km^{2} (544/sq mi)
- Time zone: UTC−01:00 (AZOT)
  - Summer (DST): UTC+00:00 (AZOST)
- Postal code: 9600-013
- Area code: 292
- Patron: Nossa Senhora da Boa Viagem
- Website: http://www.jfcalhetas.ifreg.pt

Calhetas is a freguesia ("civil parish") in the municipality of Ribeira Grande in the Azores. The population in 2011 was 988, in an area of 4.70 km². Calhetas is the smallest parish in area in Ribeira Grande. It contains the localities Calhetas and Figueira do Mato.
