= Ribeira Grande, Azores =

Ribeira Grande
- Municipality
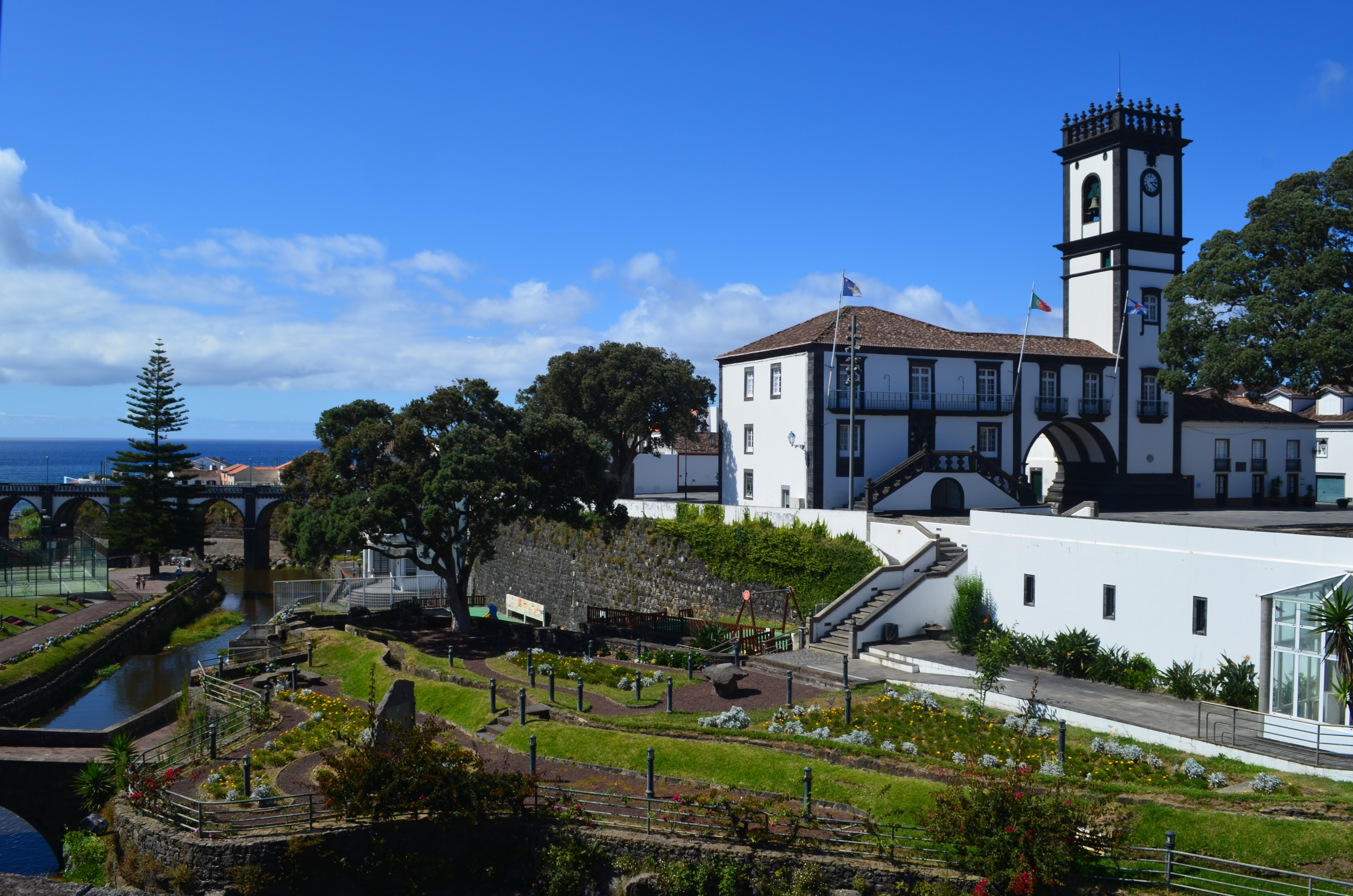
- Ribeira Grande Municipality

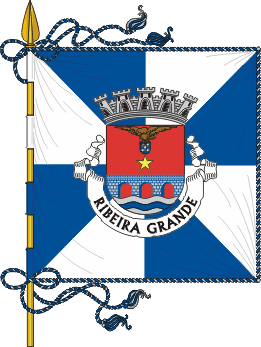
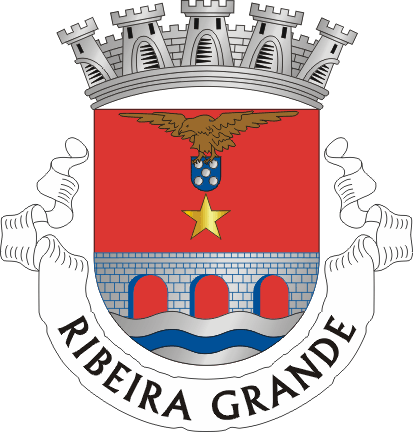
- Flag Coat of arms
- Interactive map of Ribeira Grande
- Coordinates: 37°49′21″N 25°31′5″W
- Country: Portugal
- Auton. region: Azores
- Island: São Miguel
- Established: Settlement: c. 1507
- Parishes: 14

Government
  - President: Alexandre Gaudêncio

Area
  - Total: 180.15 km^{2} (69.56 sq mi)
- Elevation: 36 m (118 ft)

Population (2011)
  - Total: 32,112
  - Density: 178.25/km^{2} (461.67/sq mi)
- Time zone: UTC−01:00 (AZOT)
  - Summer (DST): UTC+00:00 (AZOST)
- Postal code: 9600-509
- Area code: 292
- Patron: Nossa Senhora da Estrela
- Local holiday: 29 June
- Website: http://www.cm-ribeiragrande.pt

Ribeira Grande (Portuguese pronunciation: [ʁiˈβɐjɾɐ ˈɣɾɐ̃dɨ]) is a municipality in the northern part of the island of São Miguel in the Portuguese Azores. The population in 2011 was 32,112, in an area of 180.15 km^{2}. The municipal seat is located in the civil parish of Matriz, with a population of about 4000 inhabitants, part of the urbanized core of what is commonly referred to as the city of Ribeira Grande (six civil parishes, about 10000 inhabitants).

== History ==
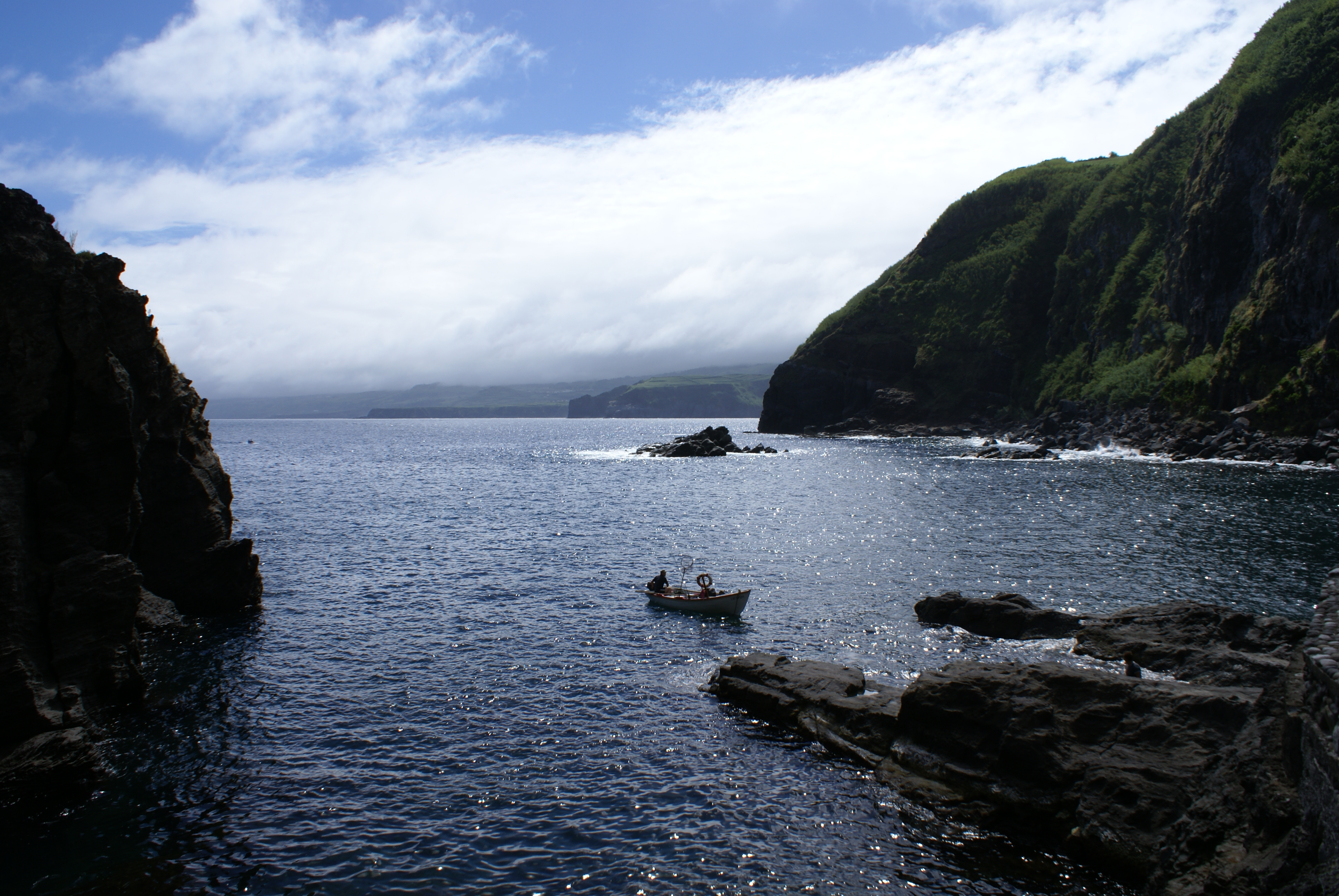
A view of the Port of Santa Iria, once the primary, and distant, waypoint for northern commerce

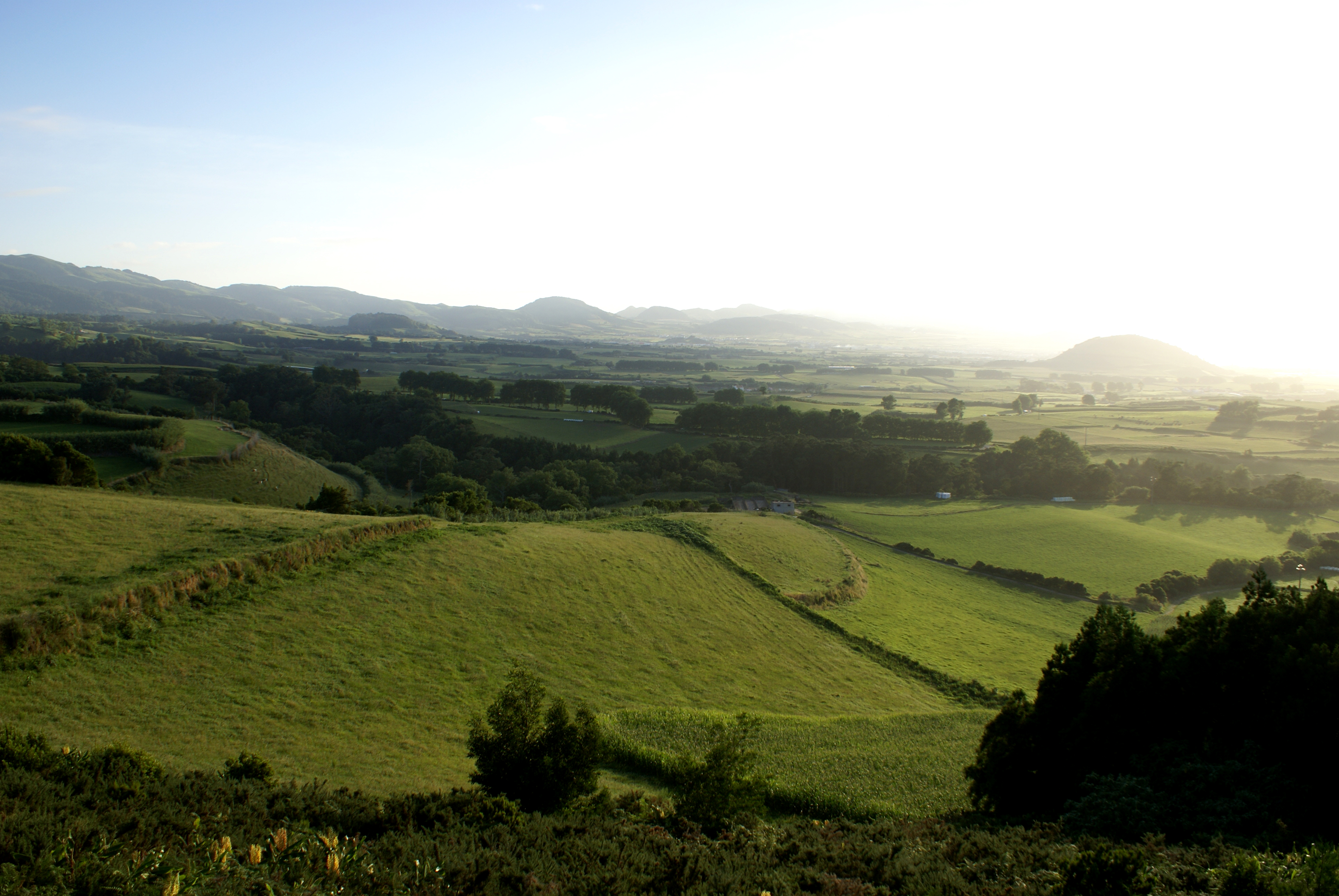
Vista of the interior of Ribeira Grande looking southeast towards the Água de Pau mountain world

The first settlers arrived on the island by the end of the second quarter of the 15th century. The expansion of settlement occurred after initiatives by the island's third donatary captain, Rui Gonçalves da Câmara (son of João Gonçalves Zarco, resulting in northern colonies from peoples from Madeira. Although the early settlement of Ribeira Grande is mired in murkiness owing to the lack of resources, the best sources indicate that settlement began in the late-15th or early-16th centuries. The first settlers to this region are to the northern part of the island by the end of the 15th century. On arriving, these colonists established their settlement along the ravine, which they eventually named after the river course: Ribeira Grande. What is certain is that before 1507, in the urban areas of today's Ribeira Grande, there were already colonists of a "certain social stature" living and raising cattle. One of these was Antão Rodrigues da Câmara, the bastard son Rui Gonçalves da Câmara, donatary-captain of São Miguel. His parentage was legitimized on 6 January 1499, and his property (situated in Ribeirinha) was described as an estate, with lands of woodlands, pasture and waters, with houses supported by granaries, haylofts, pastel engine, vineyards and orchards, received as part of his morgadia dated 17 April 1508.

The construction of the isolated Port of Santo Iria began at the beginning of the 16th century.

Even before being raised to the status of town (at the beginning of the 17th century), the population had already grown dramatically. This was recorded in a 1507 accord that established a master builder for the new church, assumed to be the parochial church of Nossa Senhora da Estrela. The elevation of Ponta Delgada to "town" in 1499, must have influenced the resident nobles of Ribeira Grande, who moved to have the same authority established for their burgh. Although the people involved were unfamiliar, Gaspar Frutuoso indicated that King Manuel I conceded to the locality of Ribeira Grande the privilege of town on 4 August 1507, that included a league around the centre, counted from the [central] pillory, comprising one parish (called Nossa Senhora da Purificação or Nossa Senhora da Estrela). It was Lopo Arês who brought the signed document from Lisbon, when he returned in 1508.

On 3 April 1508, then donatary captain, Rui Gonçalves da Câmara, oversaw the swearing in of Jorge da Mota (ordinary judge of Vila Franca do Campo) and João do Penedo and António Carneiro, noblemen of Ribeira Grande, to select twelve residents to vote on the six elected officials for the new town. It was this process that eventually elected the first municipal council, that served until 24 June 1509.

Writing at the beginning of the 15th century, Gaspar Frutuoso wrote about the settlement, in these terms:

"The town of Ribeira Grande, noble by its residents, rich in its lands, well shaded with its fields and fertile with its fruits, is situated in and around its great ravine, from which it received its name, almost in the middle of the island, in a large bay in a band of the north, at the feet of a sierra very fresh [that is near its plain, is a thing highlights the other, making its grouply more gracious then other towns]; and the ravine cuts the town in two parts, of a small time, because until the year one thousand and fifty-five there was no bridge to the western part to more than two houses only. But, later after much growth, that it is today the largest town, richer and more people then there are in all the Bishopric of Angra. Before it was suffragate of Vila Franco do Campo, until the King Dom Manuel, explain on his pillory for all parts around."

Settlers continued to be sent to the area of Ribeira Grande, by Lopo de Ares, owing to the location's access to water and the pre-existing colonists that already provided land rents. Since it was located far from the provincial capital of Vila Franca, the town was elevated to the status of town by King Manuel in 1507.

Until 1515, the western margin of the Ribeira Grande river was occupied by just two homes. A few years later, from a land record of 4 July 1520, there was a contract for stone to build a bridge alongside the main square, awarded to Fernão Álvares. Budgeted for 400.000 reais, the completed bridge was described as having one large arch with a 12 côvados span, equivalent to 7.94 metres (26.0 ft) span, and width of 22 palms, equivalent to 444 centimetres (175 in), built of the best stonework that was found around the town, and well worked.

From 1536, the monastery of Jesus was founded, in order to shelter the youth of wealthy governing families, resulting in the appearance of the toponymy Rua das Freiras and Largo das Freiras. This was a reflection of the growth of the settlement, which continued to expand regularly; in 1515 there were 200 homes; the parish of Nossa Senhora da Estrela had 800 by 1576 (on this date there were 1018 homes and 3534 souls in the municipality; and 1237 homes by 1593, with indications that the population of the municipality rounded 5000 inhabitants by this time. The growth of the demographics of the municipality necessitated that the ecclesiastical administration create new parishes, resulting in the creation of the parishes of São Pedro (in Ribeira Seca) by 1577 by bishop D. Gaspar de Faria.

Since its formation the town employed a arruador, who was responsible for "designing" the grounds and roads and houses that were made. Pêro Teixeira, who died in 1555, was the first, and was succeeded on 9 February by his successor. At the time of Pêro Teixeira's death town records point to the existence of various roadways established under his authority: Ruas de João do Outeiro, Rua da Conceição, Rua de Lourenço Gonçalves, Rua da Bica, Rua do Santo Espírito, Rua de Francisco Gonçalves Cheira-Dinheiro, Rua das Pedras, Rua do Rosário, Rua de João da Horta and references to the cobble-stoning other roads. A large part of these roads continue in the current toponymy of the town. Similarly, the a clock was established in the tower of the church in 1555 and in 1578, a bell was installed in the municipal palace tower and a new butcher appeared, attesting to the development of the urban metropolo. In other parts of the municipality, such as Rabo de Peixe, its primitive parochial church was substituted by a larger three-nave structure, that presented an ornate painting of St. Peter attributed to Vasco Fernandes (1480-1543).

Between 1612 and 1626, the Convent of São Francisco was constructed, reflecting the importance of the northern community. This growth mandated the reorganization of the island, resulting in the division of São Miguel into three municipalities: Ponta Delgada, Vila Franca do Campo and Ribeira Grande.

The aspiration to obtain the status of city began in 1852; plans for the future city were then constituted by the parishes of Nossa Senhora da Estrela (today Matriz) and Nossa Senhora da Conceição (the actual Conceição). But, nothing ever became of this project. During the intervening years the continuous growth and expansion of the burgh continued: this resulted in the construction of the Church of the Misericórdia (18th century); and need to construct a new link across the main ravine. It was during the 19th century, that the bridge of eight arcs (Portuguese: Ponte de Oito Arcos) was completed, to complement the old one arch bridge at the main square. Further expansion of the road network continued: the Rua das Pedras (today the Rua Sousa e Silva) was open, as was the Avenida Camões and the new access to the port of Santa Iria was inaugurated.

It was only on 29 June 1981 that the municipal centre obtained the status of city.

== Geography ==
=== Physical geography ===
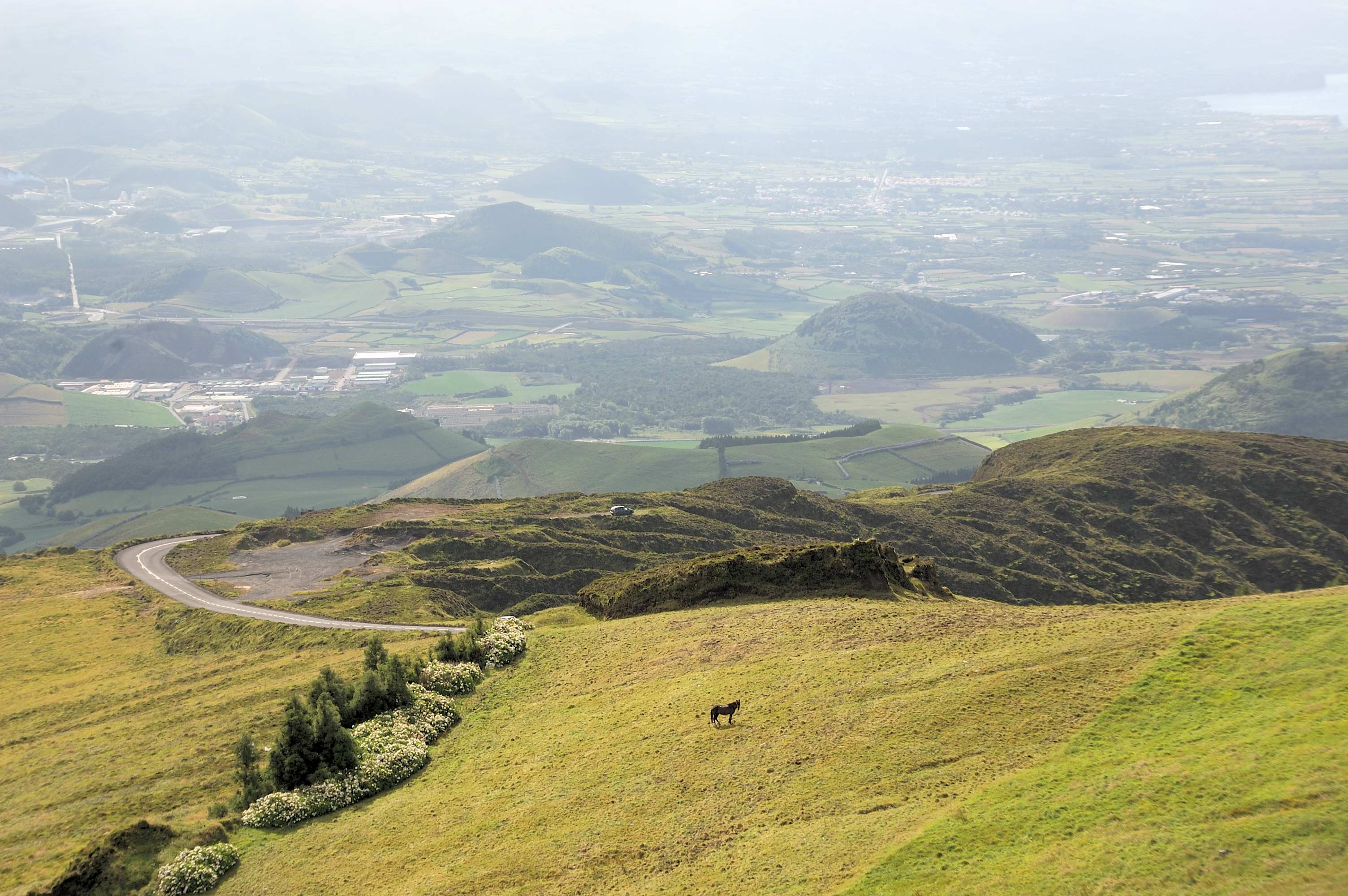
A view of the interior plateau of Ribeira Grande, showing the volcanic spatter cones

The municipality is one of the six that constitute the island of São Miguel. It occupies most of the northern section of the island, from the Atlantic coast to the volcanic mountains in the center of the island. It is the only municipality on São Miguel to share boundaries with all five other municipalities: it is bounded by Nordeste (east), Povoação (southeast), Ponta Delgada (west), Lagoa and Vila Franca do Campo (south). All the municipalities are linked by several regional roads that circle the island or cross the mountains in the central section.

The relief is dominated by the Serra de Água de Pau, which includes a caldeira occupied by the Lagoa do Fogo (Lake of Fire). The highest elevation is Pico da Barrosa at 947 metres (3,107 ft) (overlooking Lagoa do Fogo) or Monte Escuro at 890 metres (2,920 ft); this volcanic massif also extends to the plateau of Graminhais, by the eastern border with Nordeste, where the Pico do Salto do Cavalo 954 metres (3,130 ft) has a well known lookout. The volcanic geology, associated to the occurrence of many springs in the foothills, have been responsible for the fast creeks flowing in deep ravines, one of which gave its name to the town. Other volcanic manifestations in the area are fumaroles, such as Caldeira Velha or Caldeiras, and mineral hot springs at Lombadas, Gramas and Ladeira da Velha.

In addition to the river valleys and mountains, there are several beaches, including the main beaches in Ribeira Grande (Santa Bárbara and Monte Verde), Moinhos Beach (at Porto Formoso) and Viola Beach (in the shadow of Lomba da Maia).

=== Human geography ===
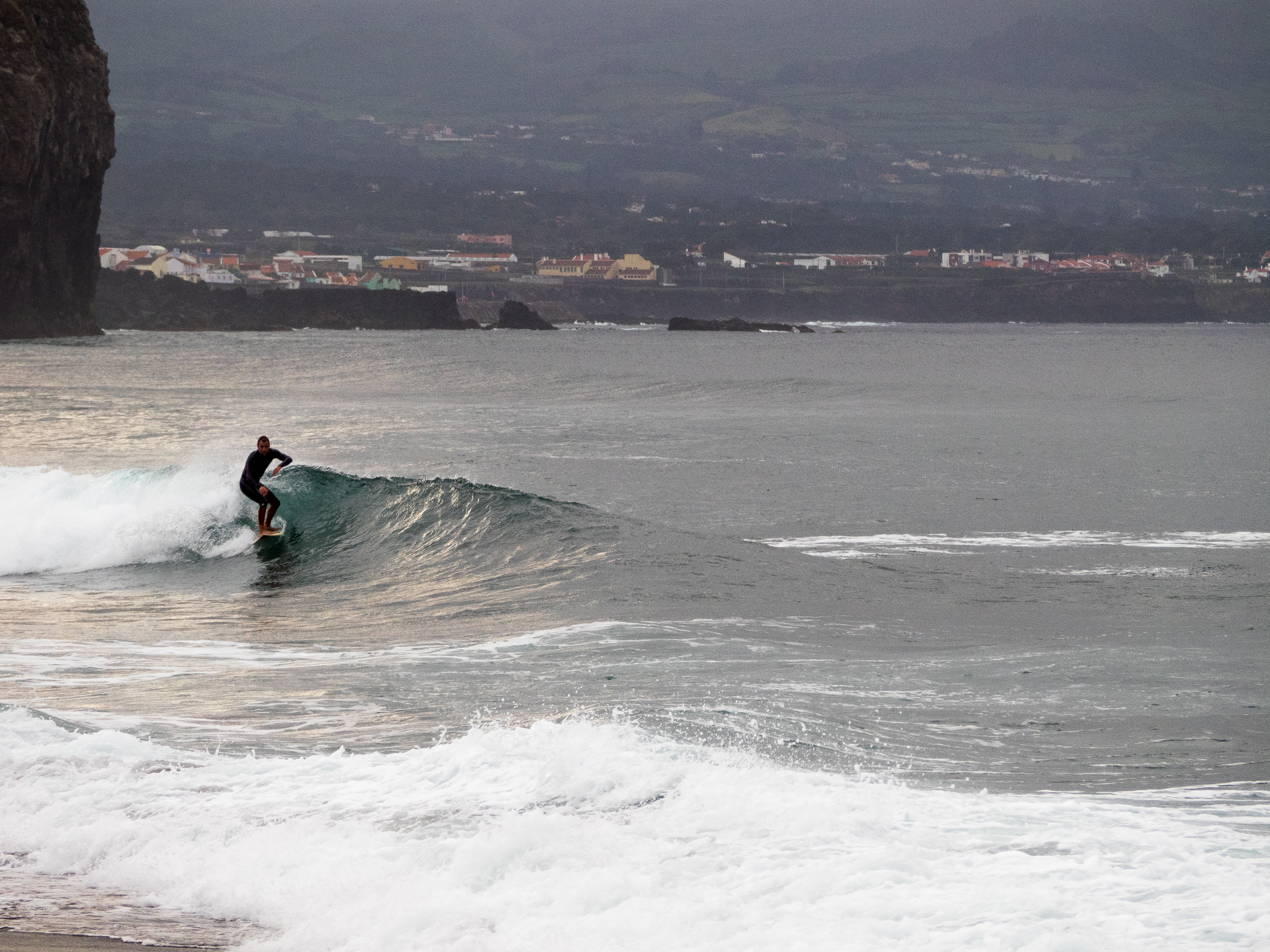
The long beach of Santa Bárbara and Monte Verde, used by surfers

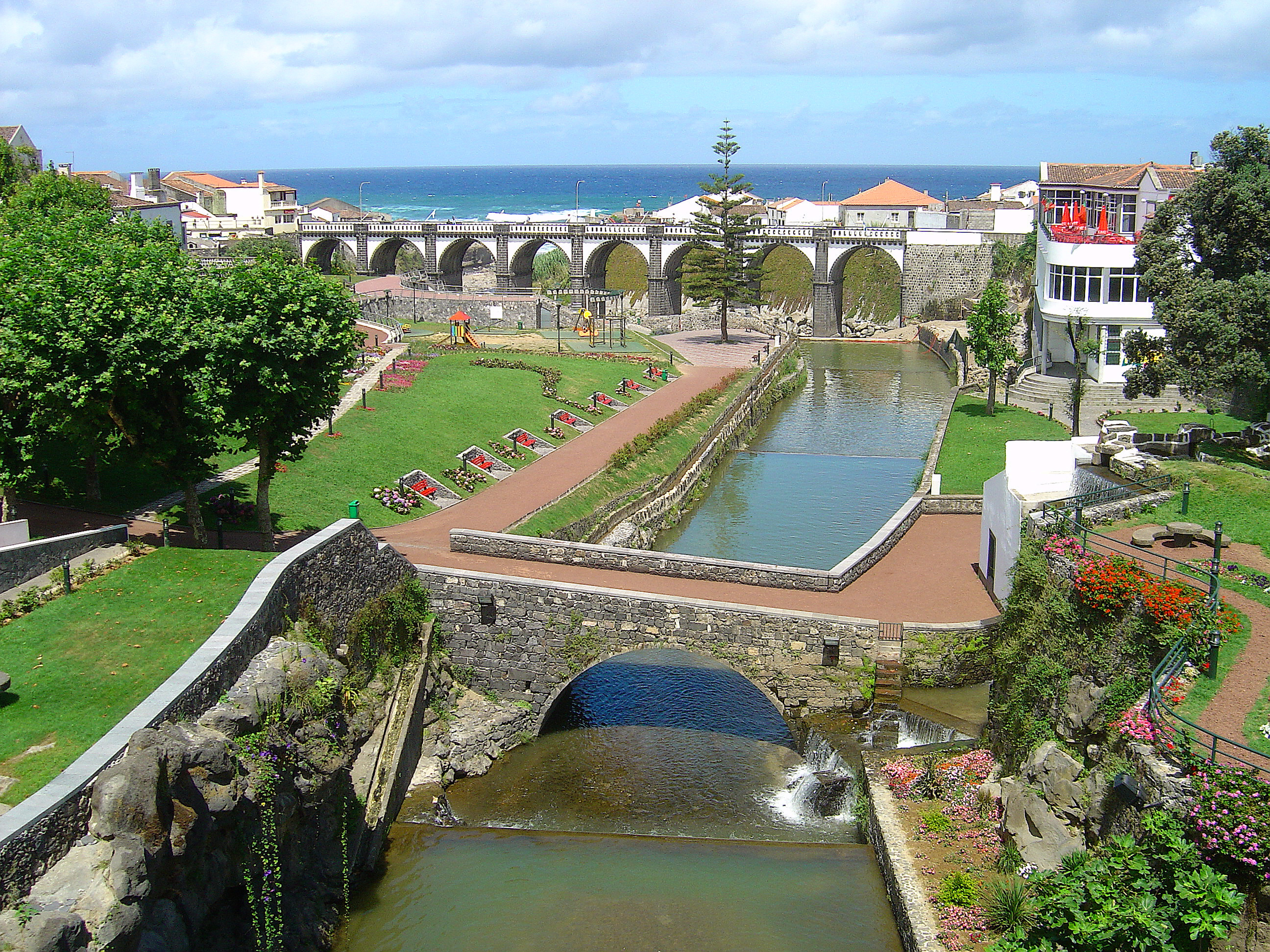
The center of Ribeira Grande, including the Ponte de Oito Arcos

The municipality is divided into 14 sub-regional administrative authorities, or freguesias (civil parishes):

- Calhetas
- Conceição (Ribeira Grande)
- Fenais da Ajuda
- Lomba da Maia
- Lomba de São Pedro
- Maia
- Matriz (Ribeira Grande), the main urbanized area, and seat of the municipality, it has a population of just under 4000 inhabitants, and is the socio-cultural centre (location of many of the historical architectural buildings/structures);
- Pico da Pedra
- Porto Formoso
- Rabo de Peixe
- Ribeira Seca
- Ribeirinha
- Santa Bárbara
- São Brás

The largest parish in population (and density) is Rabo de Peixe, while the smallest is São Brás. In area, the largest parish is Maia, and the smallest is Calhetas. The highest village is Lomba da Maia.

== Twin towns — sister cities ==
Ribeira Grande is twinned with:

- Somerville, United States
- Fall River, United States
- East Providence, United States
- Laval, Canada
- Porto Alegre, Brazil
- Ribeira Grande de Santiago, Cape Verde
- Paul, Cape Verde
- Porto Novo, Cape Verde
- Ribeira Grande, Cape Verde

== Architecture ==
=== Civic ===
- Arquipelago Center of the Arts (Portuguese: Arquipélago Centro de artes contemporâneas)
- Augusto César Ferreira Cabido Home (Portuguese: Asilo de Mendicidade Augusto César Ferreira Cabido/Lar Augusto César Ferreira Cabido)
- Estate of Boa Viagem (Portuguese: Solar da Boa Viagem/Casa das Calhetas)
- Estate of Mafoma (Portuguese: Solar da Mafoma)
- Estate of Nossa Senhora do Vencimento (Portuguese: Solar de Nossa Senhora do Vencimento)
- Estate of São Sebastião (Portuguese: Solar de São Sebastião e Capela)
- Judicial Court of Ribeira Grande (Portuguese: Judicial Court of Ribeira Grande)
- Lighthouse of Ponta do Cintrão (Portuguese: Farol da Ponta do Cintrão)
- Municipal Palace/Hall of Ribeira Grande (Portuguese: Paços do Concelho da Ribeira Grande)
- Philharmonic Society Progressive of the North (Portuguese: Sociedade Filarmónica Progresso do Norte)
- Rabo de Peixe Fishermens' Barrio (Portuguese: Bairro de Casas para Pescadores de Rabo de Peixe)
- Santa Bárbara Parochial and Social Centre (Portuguese: Centro Social e Paroquial de Santa Bárbara)
- Theatre Ribeiragrandense (Portuguese: Teatro Ribeira Grandense)
- Thermal Springs of Caldeiras (Portuguese: Termas das Caldeiras da Ribeira Grande)

=== Churches ===
- Seventh-day Adventist Church of Lomba de São Pedro (Portuguese: Igreja Adventista do Sétimo Dia em Lomba de S. Pedro)
- Church of Espírito Santo (Portuguese: Igreja e Hospital da Santa Casa da Misericórdia da Ribeira Grande/Igreja dos Passos/Igreja do Espírito Santo)
- Church of the Divino Espírito Santo (Portuguese: Igreja Paroquial de Maia/Igreja do Divino Espírito Santo)
- Church of Nossa Senhora dos Aflitos (Portuguese: Igreja de Nossa Senhora da Aflição/Igreja de Nossa Senhora dos Aflitos)
- Church of Nossa Senhora da Boa Viagem (Portuguese: Igreja Paroquial de Calhetas/Igreja Nossa Senhora da Boa Viagem)
- Church of Nossa Senhora da Conceição (Portuguese: Igreja Paroquial da Conceição/Igreja de Nossa Senhora da Conceição)
- Church of Nossa Senhora das Dores (Portuguese: Igreja de Nossa Senhora das Dores)
- Church of Nossa Senhora da Estrela (Portuguese: Igreja Paroquial de Ribeira Grande/Igreja de Nossa Senhora da Estrela)
- Church of Nossa Senhora da Graça (Portuguese: Igreja Paroquial de Porto Formoso/Igreja de Nossa Senhora da Graça)
- Church of Nossa Senhora dos Prazeres (Portuguese: Igreja Paroquial Pico da Pedra/Igreja de Nossa Senhora dos Prazeres)
- Church of Nossa Senhora do Rosário (Portuguese: Igreja Paroquial de Lomba da Maia/Igreja de Nossa Senhora do Rosário)
- Church of Nossa Senhora das Vitórias (Portuguese: Igreja Paroquial de Santa Bárbara/Igreja de Santa Bárbara/Igreja de Nossa Senhora das Vitórias)
- Church of Santíssimo Salvador do Mundo (Portuguese: Igreja Paroquial de Ribeirinha/Igreja do Santíssimo Salvador do Mundo)
- Church of Santos Reis Magos (Portuguese: Igreja Paroquial Fenais da Ajuda/Igreja dos Santos Reis Magos)
- Church of São Brás (Portuguese: Igreja Paroquial de São Brás/Igreja de São Brás)
- Church of São Pedro (Portuguese: Igreja de Lomba de São Pedro/Igreja de São Pedro)
- Church of São Pedro (Portuguese: Igreja Paroquial de Ribeira Seca/Igreja de São Pedro)
- Church of Senhor Bom Jesus (Portuguese: Igreja Paroquial de Rabo de Peixe/Igreja do Senhor Bom Jesus)
- Convent of Nossa Senhora de Guadalupe (Portuguese: Convento da Ordem de São Francisco/Convento de Nossa Senhora de Guadalupe)
- Convent of Nossa Senhora da Ajuda (Portuguese: Convento de Nossa Senhora da Ajuda/Igreja de Nossa Senhora da Ajuda)
- Hermitage of Nossa Senhora da Conceição das Vinhas (Portuguese: Ermida de Nossa Senhora da Conceição das Vinhas)
- Hermitage of Nossa Senhora da Salvação (Portuguese: Ermida de Nossa Senhora da Salvação)
- Hermitage of Nossa Senhora das Dores (Portuguese: Ermida de Nossa Senhora das Dores)
- Hermitage of Nossa Senhora do Rosário (Portuguese: Ermida de Nossa Senhora do Rosário)
- Hermitage of Nossa Senhora de Fátima (Portuguese: Ermida de Nossa Senhora do Rosário / Ermida de Nossa Senhora de Fátima)
- Hermitage of Santa Luzia (Portuguese: Ermida de Santa Luzia)
- Hermitage of Santo André (Portuguese: Ermida de Santo André)
- Hermitage of Bom Successo (Portuguese: Ermida do Bom Sucesso/Ermida de Nossa Senhora do Bom Sucesso)
- Monastery of Nossa Senhora das Mercês (Portuguese: Mosteiro de Nossa Senhora das Mercês)
- Passos da Via Sacra da Ribeira Grande
