= Ribeira Seca (Ribeira Grande) =

- Civil parish
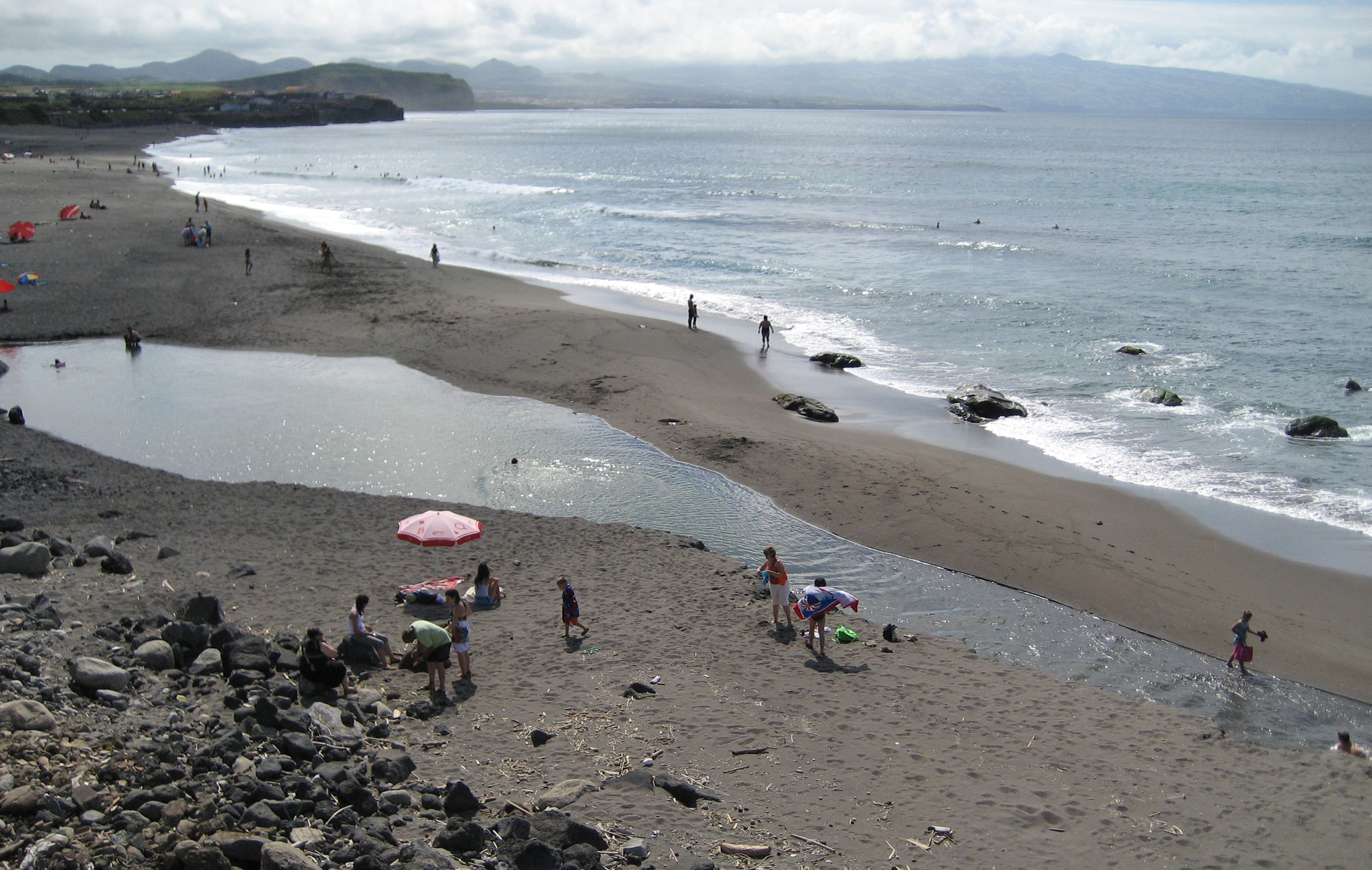
- Santa Bárbara beach on the northern coast of Ribeira Seca, the most popular destination for surfers on the island.

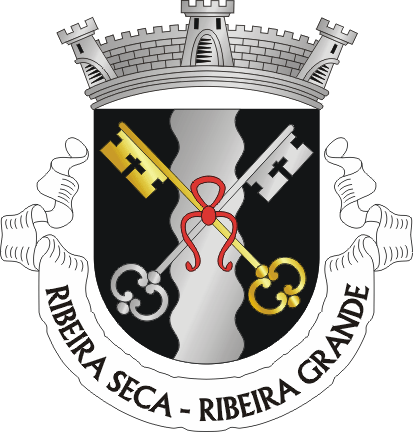
- Coat of arms

- Location of the civil parish of Ribeira Seca within the municipality of Ribeira Grande
- Coordinates: 37°48′57″N 25°32′16″W
- Country: Portugal
- Auton. region: Azores
- Island: São Miguel
- Municipality: Ribeira Grande
- Established: Settlement: c. 1515; Parish: 12 December 1575; Civil parish: 25 October 1576

Area
  - Total: 12.59 km^{2} (4.86 sq mi)
- Elevation: 20 m (66 ft)

Population (2011)
  - Total: 2,950
  - Density: 234/km^{2} (607/sq mi)
- Time zone: UTC−01:00 (AZOT)
  - Summer (DST): UTC+00:00 (AZOST)
- Postal code: 9600-217
- Area code: 296
- Patron: São Pedro
- Website: https://www.jfribeiraseca.net

Ribeira Seca (Portuguese for dry stream) is a civil parish in the municipality of Ribeira Grande in the Portuguese archipelago of the Azores. The population in 2011 was 2,950, in an area of 12.59 km^{2}. It is located near the north coast of the island. It contains the localities Bandejo, Morro de Cima and Ribeira Seca.

== Architecture ==
The parish has a rich combination of modern and historical patrimony, in addition to natural spaces, such as the northern beach of Santa Bárbara, popular with surfers and watersports enthusiasts. These include:

=== Civic ===
- Manorhouse of Mafoma (Portuguese: Solar da Mafoma)

=== Military ===
- Casamates of Santa Bárbara (Portuguese: Casamatas ao Areal de Santa Bárbara)

=== Religious ===
- Church of São Pedro (Portuguese: Igreja Paroquial de Ribeira Seca/Igreja de São Pedro)
- Hermitage of Mãe de Deus (Portuguese: Ermida de Mãe de Deus)
- Hermitage of Nossa Senhora da Paciência (Portuguese: Ermida de Nossa Senhora da Paciência/Ermida do Senhor da Paciência/Ermida do Ecce Homo)
- Hermitage of Nossa Senhora da Quietação (Portuguese: Ermida de Nossa Senhora da Quietação)
- Hermitage of Bom Sucesso (Portuguese: Ermida do Bom Sucesso/Ermida de Nossa Senhora do Bom Sucesso)

== Culture ==
The parish is traditionally the seat of the Cavalhadas de São Pedro, an event that occurs every 29 June, and celebrates the elevation of Ribeira Grande to the status of the city, with associated festivities. During the statutory holiday, the local residents prepare the Alâmpadas de São Pedro that decorate the roads and homes of the parish during this period. Preceding these events, on 28 June, is the Marchas de São Pedro, (Marches of St. Peter) that attract hundreds of participants, who parade through the parish.
