= Arrouquelas =

- Civil parish
- Location in Portugal
- Coordinates: 39°15′20″N 8°53′38″W
- Country: Portugal
- Region: Oeste e Vale do Tejo
- Intermunic. comm.: Lezíria do Tejo
- District: Santarém
- Municipality: Rio Maior

Area
  - Total: 27.81 km^{2} (10.74 sq mi)

Population (2011)
  - Total: 591
  - Density: 21/km^{2} (55/sq mi)
- Time zone: UTC+00:00 (WET)
  - Summer (DST): UTC+01:00 (WEST)

Arrouquelas is a civil parish in the municipality of Rio Maior, Portugal. The population in 2011 was 591, in an area of 27.81 km².
