= Santa Bárbara (Ribeira Grande) =

- Civil parish
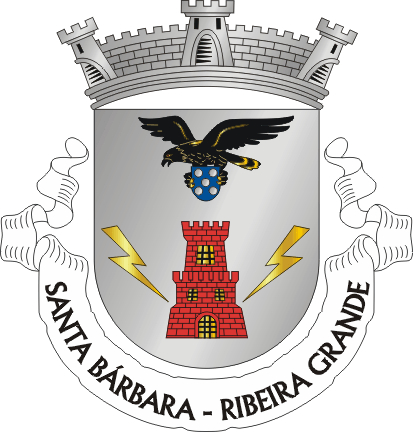
- Coat of arms

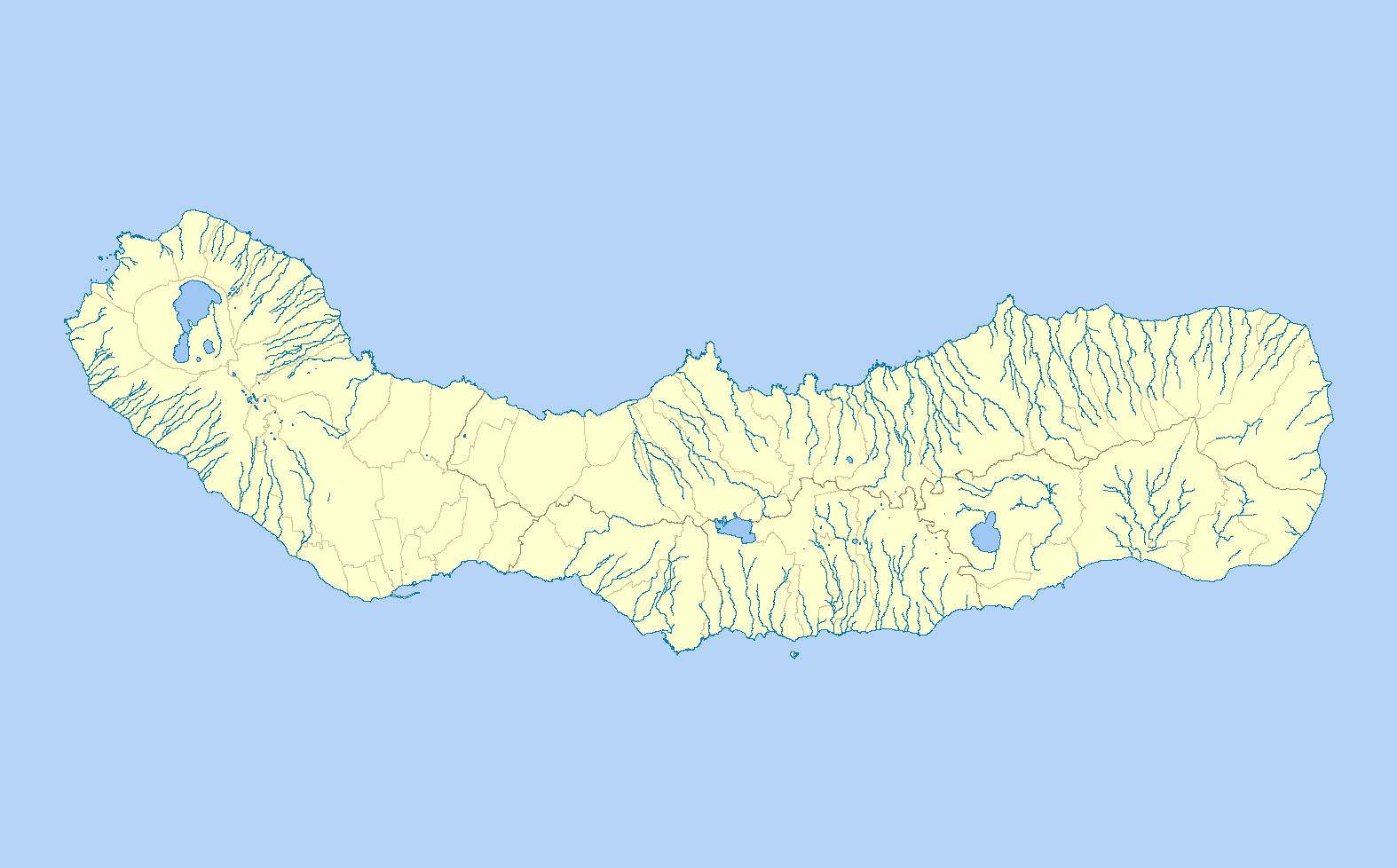
- Location in the Azores Santa Bárbara (São Miguel)
- Coordinates: 37°47′58″N 25°32′1″W
- Country: Portugal
- Auton. region: Azores
- Island: São Miguel
- Municipality: Ribeira Grande
- Established: Settlement: c. 1522; Parish: 10 April 1736; Civil parish: June 1971

Area
  - Total: 12.84 km^{2} (4.96 sq mi)
- Elevation: 88 m (289 ft)

Population (2011)
  - Total: 1,275
  - Density: 99/km^{2} (260/sq mi)
- Time zone: UTC−01:00 (AZOT)
  - Summer (DST): UTC+00:00 (AZOST)
- Postal code: 9600-420
- Area code: 292
- Patron: Nossa Senhora das Vitórias
- Website: freguesiasantabarbara.pt

Santa Bárbara (Portuguese for Saint Barbara) is a parish in the municipality of Ribeira Grande in the Azores. The population in 2011 was 1,275, in an area of 12.84 km^{2}. It contains the localities Chavinha, Courela, Diogo and Santa Bárbara.
