= Lomba de São Pedro =

- Civil parish
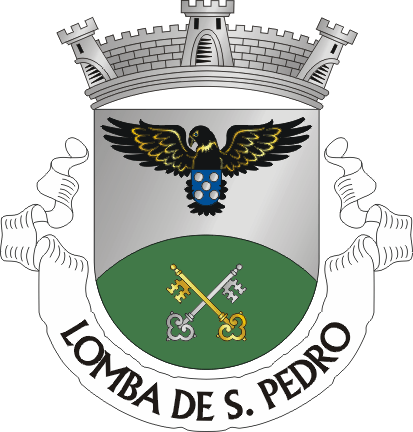
- Coat of arms

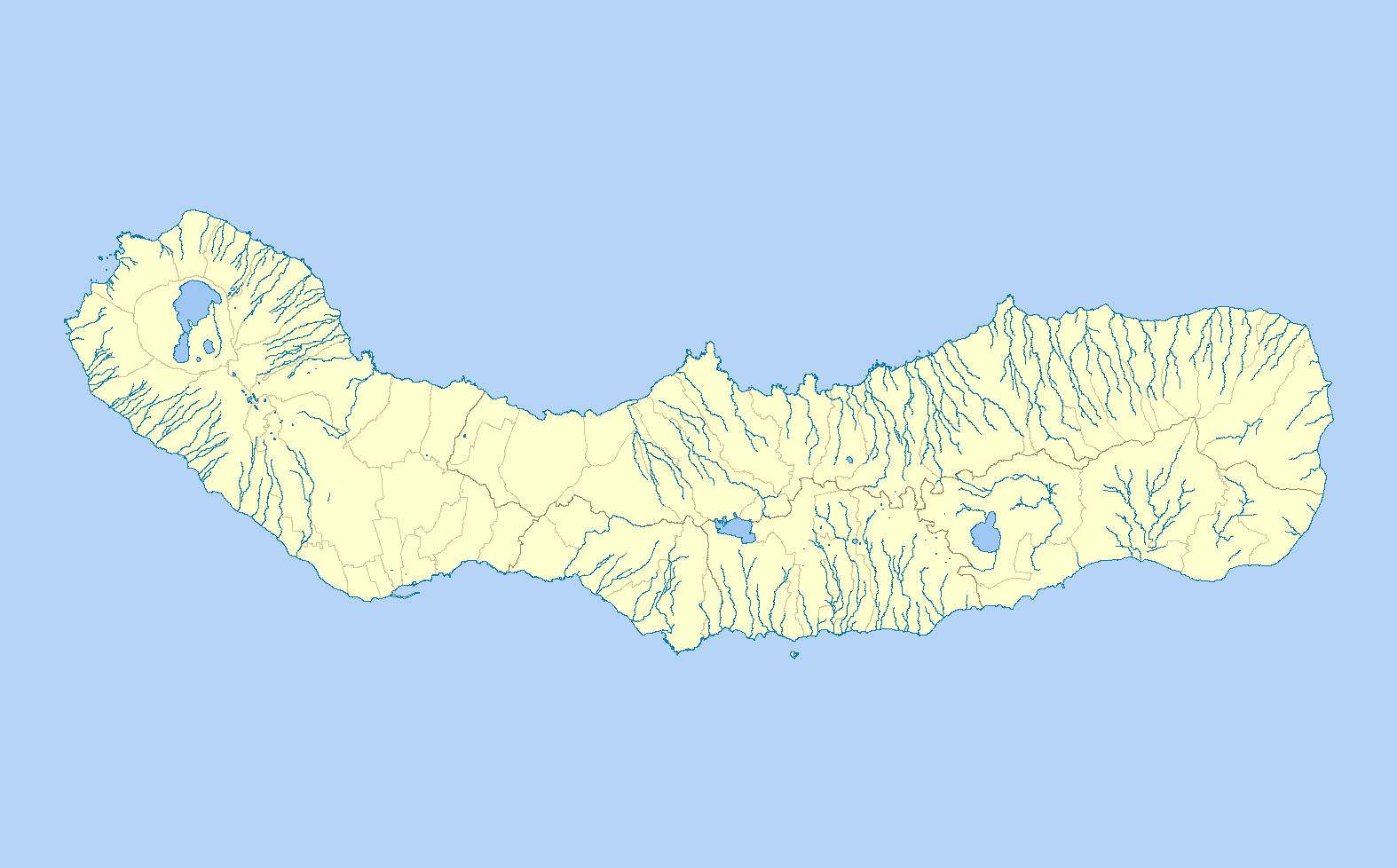
- Location in the Azores Lomba de São Pedro (São Miguel)
- Coordinates: 37°50′49″N 25°18′54″W
- Country: Portugal
- Auton. region: Azores
- Island: São Miguel
- Municipality: Ribeira Grande

Area
  - Total: 8.25 km^{2} (3.19 sq mi)
- Elevation: 196 m (643 ft)

Population (2011)
  - Total: 284
  - Density: 34/km^{2} (89/sq mi)
- Time zone: UTC−01:00 (AZOT)
  - Summer (DST): UTC+00:00 (AZOST)
- Postal code: 9625-204
- Area code: 292
- Patron: São Pedro

Lomba de São Pedro is a civil parish in the municipality of Ribeira Grande in the Portuguese in the archipelago of the Azores. The population in 2011 was 284, in an area of 8.25 km². Lomba de São Pedro is the least-populated parish in Ribeira Grande.

== History ==
Lomba de São Pedro was a historically part of Fenais da Ajuda, until being elevated to the status of civil parish by regional decree 24/80/A, on 15 September 1980.

The parish of Lomba de São Pedro is the most distant parish in the municipality of Ribeira Grande. Its foundation and settlement has been lost historically, to the point that the Azorean chronicler Gaspar Frutuoso does not refer to it in his detailed descriptions of the area.

The parochial church, dedicated to Saint Peter, was constructed in the 19th century by Dr. José Maria. The interior of the temple includes an image of the patron saint, donated by António José de Lima, and an altar decorated in gilded woodwork and surmounted with royal coat-of-arms.

== Geography ==
The parish is located along the Regional E.R.1-1ª roadway linking the municipalities of Ribeira Grande and Nordeste: Lomba de São Pedro is situated between Salga and Fenais da Ajuda. This parish is a long strip that extends from the Atlantic into the interior. The region's toponymy derives literally refers to its geographic position, situated on the lomba (hullock or plateau) dividing two ravines, and associated with the religious veneration of Saint Peter in that area. The parish contains the localities Lomba de Baixo and Lomba de Cima.

== Churches ==
- Church of São Pedro (Portuguese: Igreja de Lomba de São Pedro/Igreja de São Pedro), based on a hermitage from the 16th century, this temple was constructed in the mid-19th century;
- Seventh-day Adventist Church of Lomba de São Pedro One of two Seventh-day Adventist churches on the island of São Miguel, with the other church being in Ponta Delgada.
