= Fenais da Ajuda =

- Civil parish
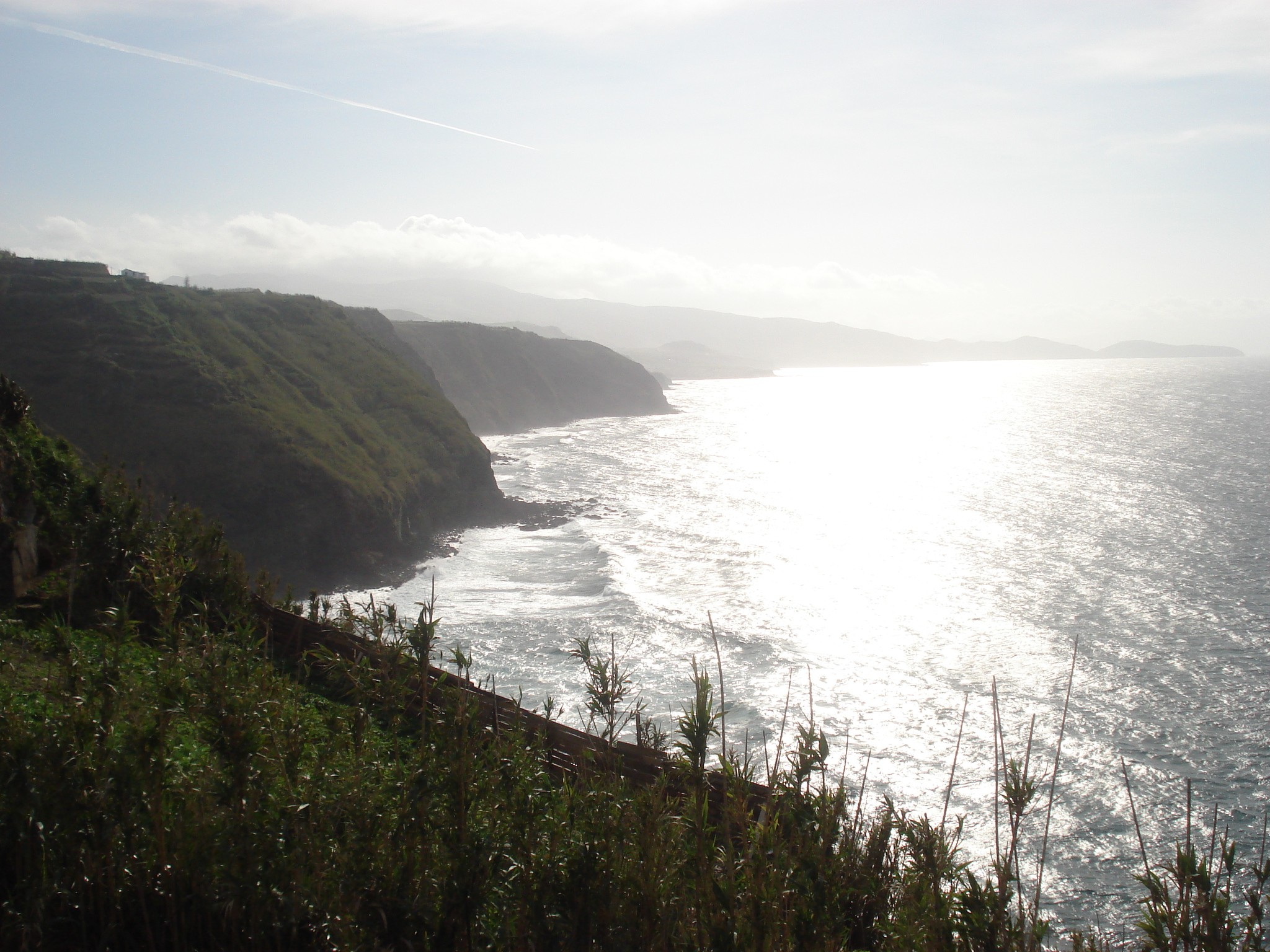
- The northwestern coast of Fenais da Ajuda, as seen from the area near Lombinha and Ponte

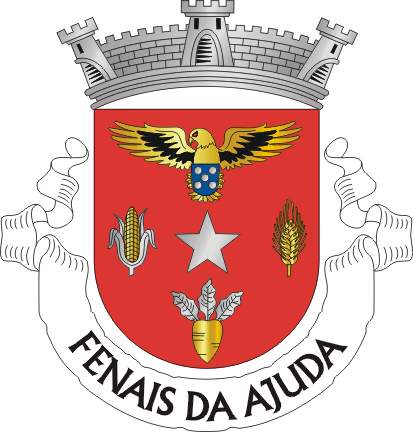
- Coat of arms

- Location of the civil parish of Fenais da Ajuda within the municipality of Ribeira Grande
- Coordinates: 37°51′5″N 25°19′26″W
- Country: Portugal
- Auton. region: Azores
- Island: São Miguel
- Municipality: Ribeira Grande
- Established: Settlement: c. 1500; Parish: c. 1541; Civil parish: c. 1832

Area
  - Total: 13.36 km^{2} (5.16 sq mi)
- Elevation: 162 m (531 ft)

Population (2011)
  - Total: 1,131
  - Density: 84.66/km^{2} (219.3/sq mi)
- Time zone: UTC−01:00 (AZOT)
  - Summer (DST): UTC+00:00 (AZOST)
- Postal code: 9625-025
- Area code: 292
- Patron: Nossa Senhora da Ajuda

Fenais da Ajuda is a civil parish in the municipality of Ribeira Grande in the Portuguese archipelago of the Azores. The population in 2011 was 1,131, in an area of 13.36 km^{2}.

== History ==
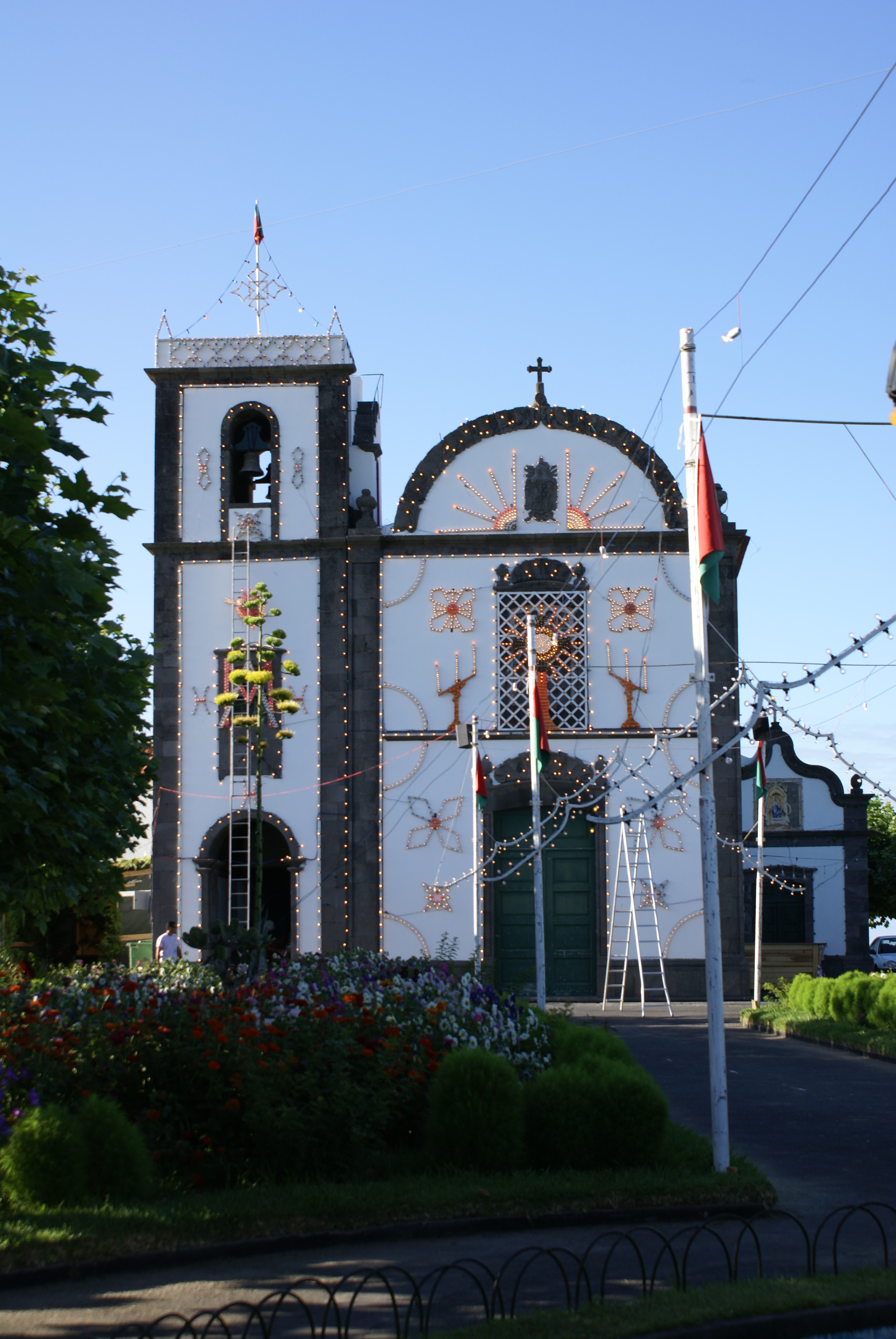
The Church of Nossa Senhora da Aflição, on the coastal edge of the parish

The name Fenais da Ajuda comes from fenais (hay or other herbaceous plants used as animal fodder, since the area historically produced much animal fodder), and from its patron saint, Nossa Senhora da Ajuda (Our Lady of Assistance), and a Franciscan monastery to Her honour that was located in the parish. Similarly, the area was known as Fenais da Vera Cruz, due to the area's similarity to a Christian cross, and later as Fenais da Maia when the Maia parish was sited there.

In the Livro do Tombo da Igreja dos Santos Reis Magos (burial registry for the Church of Santos Reis Magos), until 1819 the parish was part of the municipality of Vila Franca do Campo, but was later integrated into the municipality of Ribeira Grande.

The first inhabitants came from the neighbouring parish of Maia around 1500. They built a chapel dedicated to the Santos Reis Magos (literally, Sainted Magi Kings, or the New Testament Magi, who were protectors of Portuguese navigators and explorers). Historian Gaspar Frutuoso said of these settlers:

"There is a place in these Fenais, a parish of Reis Magos, where there were many noble settlers."

The first vicar, Bernardo de Froes, operated the religious institution and the local affiliated industry, which was supported by meager revenues from the Church. In 1541, the church was elevated to the status of parish. In 1832, the parochial Church of the Santos Reis Magos was begun, and it was consecrated in 1843.

The church building is a good example of period construction, having been successively conserved by the Ordem Terceira de São Francisco (Third of Saint Francis), more commonly known as the Third Order. The small chapel, dedicated to Our Lady of Help/Aid was built on the site of a much older Franciscan chapel by monks around 1681, under the direction of Lázaro Estrela (to fulfill a promise to the Virgin Mary), and remained in their possession. Between 1832 and 1847 the chapel served as an ornate parochial seat, its austere main nave in contrast to a painted lateral chapel, constructed in a Revivalist style and embossed with gold. This Franciscan monastery was vacated in 1832 when the Liberals expelled the monks, and the building was abandoned. After being sold, the convent was demolished.

Near Ribeira Funda (named for a nearby deep ravine, since ribeira funda means deep ravine), the parochial Church of Nossa Senhora da Aflição (Our Lady of Affliction) was constructed. The building resulted from the enlargement of the minor chapel (to the same invocation) which was ordered built by descendants of Captain António de Medeiros and his wife Maria Francisca.

== Geography ==
The parish of Fenais da Ajuda occupies an area of 13.36 square kilometres (5.16 mi^{2}), along the northern coast of Ribeira Grande between the parishes of Lomba da Maia and Lomba de São Pedro and Furnas in the neighbouring municipality of Povoação. It contains the localities Criação, Espigão, Fenais da Ajuda and Ribeira Funda.

== Architecture ==
- Convent/Church of Nossa Senhora da Ajuda (Portuguese: Convento de Nossa Senhora da Ajuda/Igreja de Nossa Senhora da Ajuda)
- Church of Nossa Senhora da Aflição (Portuguese: Igreja de Nossa Senhora da Aflição/Igreja de Nossa Senhora dos Aflitos)
- Church of Santos Reis Magos (Portuguese: Igreja Paroquial Fenais da Ajuda/Igreja dos Santos Reis Magos)
