= Matriz (Ribeira Grande) =

- Civil parish
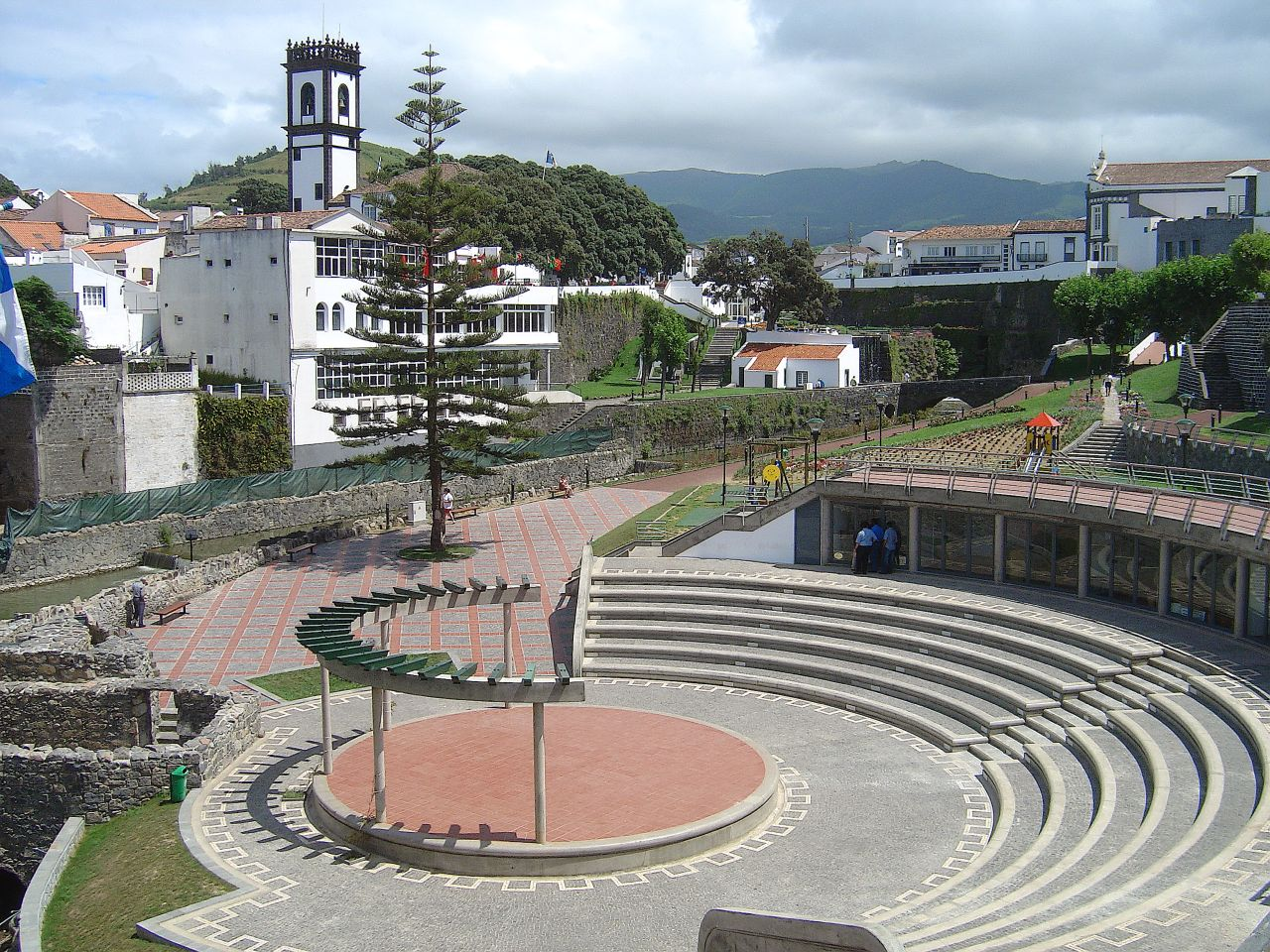
- The garden Ribeira dos Moinhos alongside Ribeira Grande, part of the parish of Matriz in Ribeira Grande

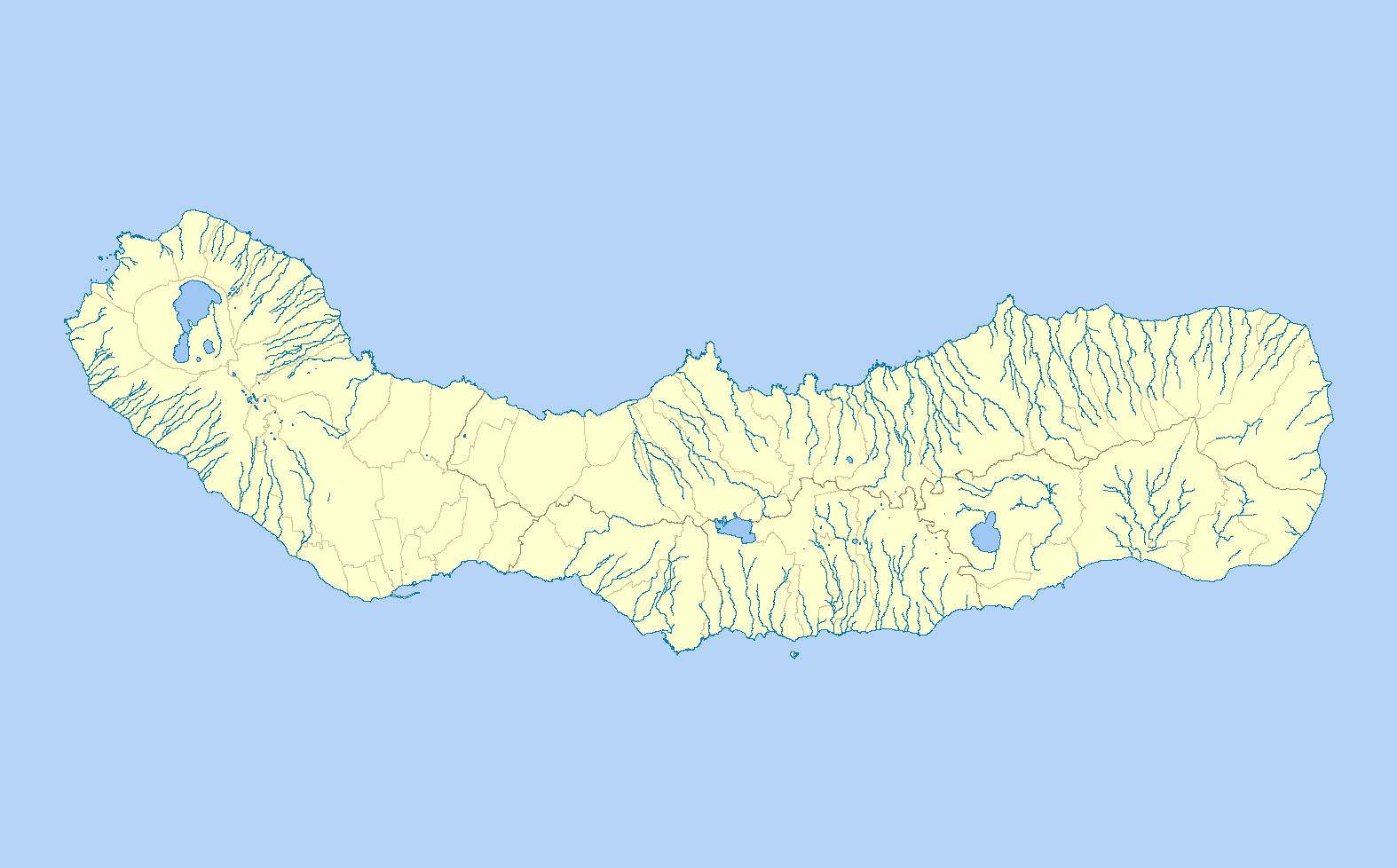
- Location in the Azores Matriz (São Miguel)
- Coordinates: 37°49′24″N 25°31′13″W
- Country: Portugal
- Auton. region: Azores
- Island: São Miguel
- Municipality: Ribeira Grande

Area
  - Total: 10.84 km^{2} (4.19 sq mi)
- Elevation: 34 m (112 ft)

Population (2011)
  - Total: 3,968
  - Density: 366.1/km^{2} (948.1/sq mi)
- Time zone: UTC−01:00 (AZOT)
  - Summer (DST): UTC+00:00 (AZOST)
- Postal code: 9600-572
- Area code: 292
- Patron: Nossa Senhora da Estrela
- Website: www.jfmatriz.com

Matriz is a parish in the district of Ribeira Grande in the Azores. The population in 2011 was 3,968, in an area of 10.84 km^{2}. It is situated on the north coast of the island. Together with the parish Conceição, it forms the town Ribeira Grande. It contains the localities Bairro de Santa Luzia, Caldeiras and Matriz.
