= São Brás (Ribeira Grande) =

- Civil parish
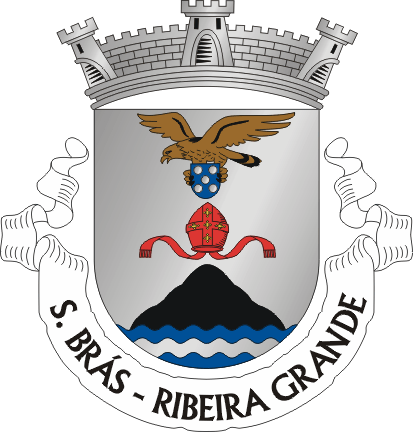
- Coat of arms

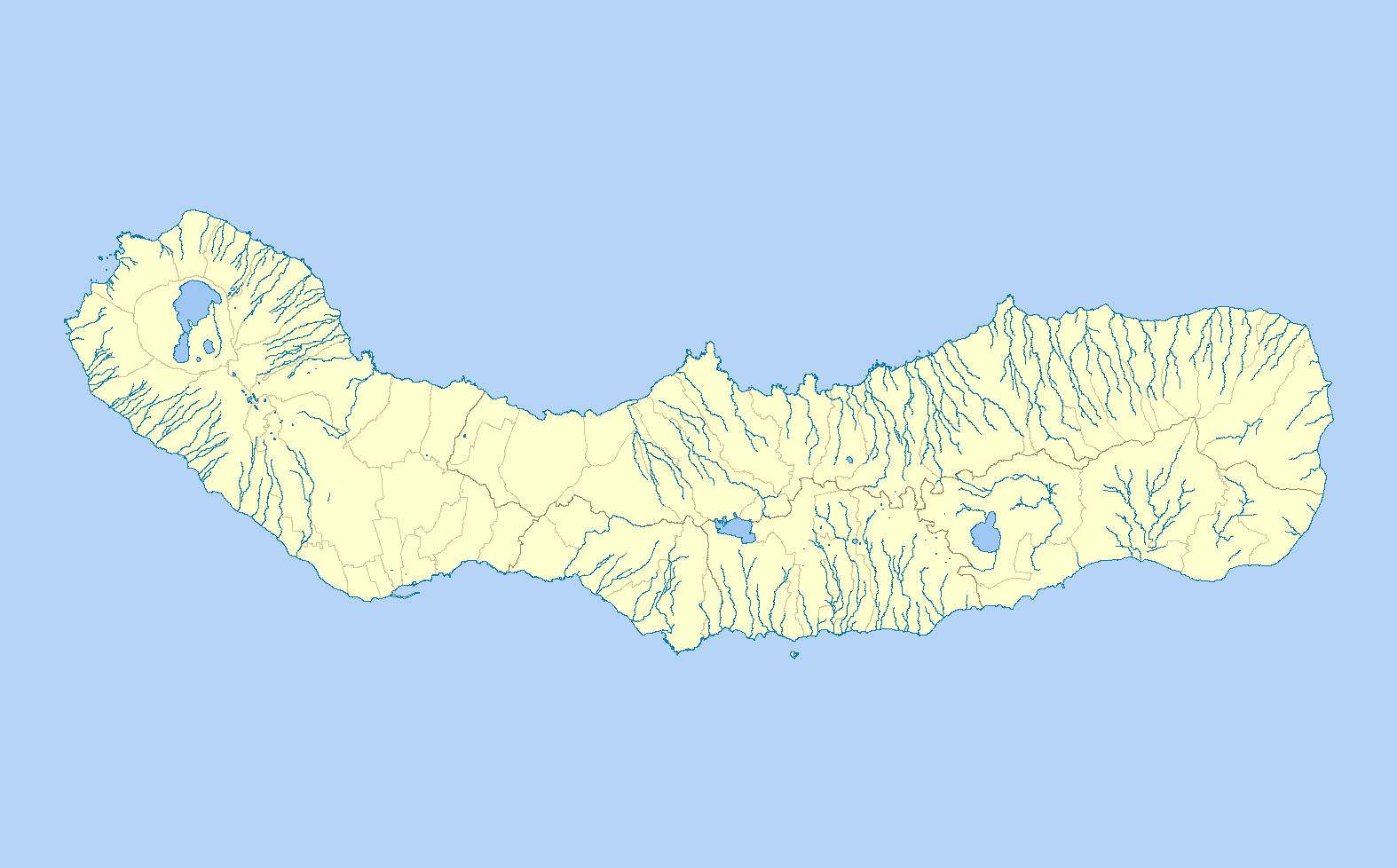
- Location in the Azores São Brás (São Miguel)
- Coordinates: 37°49′6″N 25°24′45″W
- Country: Portugal
- Auton. region: Azores
- Island: São Miguel
- Municipality: Ribeira Grande

Area
  - Total: 8.08 km^{2} (3.12 sq mi)
- Elevation: 164 m (538 ft)

Population (2011)
  - Total: 650
  - Density: 80/km^{2} (210/sq mi)
- Time zone: UTC−01:00 (AZOT)
  - Summer (DST): UTC+00:00 (AZOST)
- Postal code: 9625-510
- Area code: 292
- Patron: São Brás

São Brás (Portuguese for Saint Blaise) is a parish in the district of Ribeira Grande in the Azores. The population in 2011 was 650, in an area of 8.08 km^{2}.
