= Ribeira das Tainhas =

- Civil parish
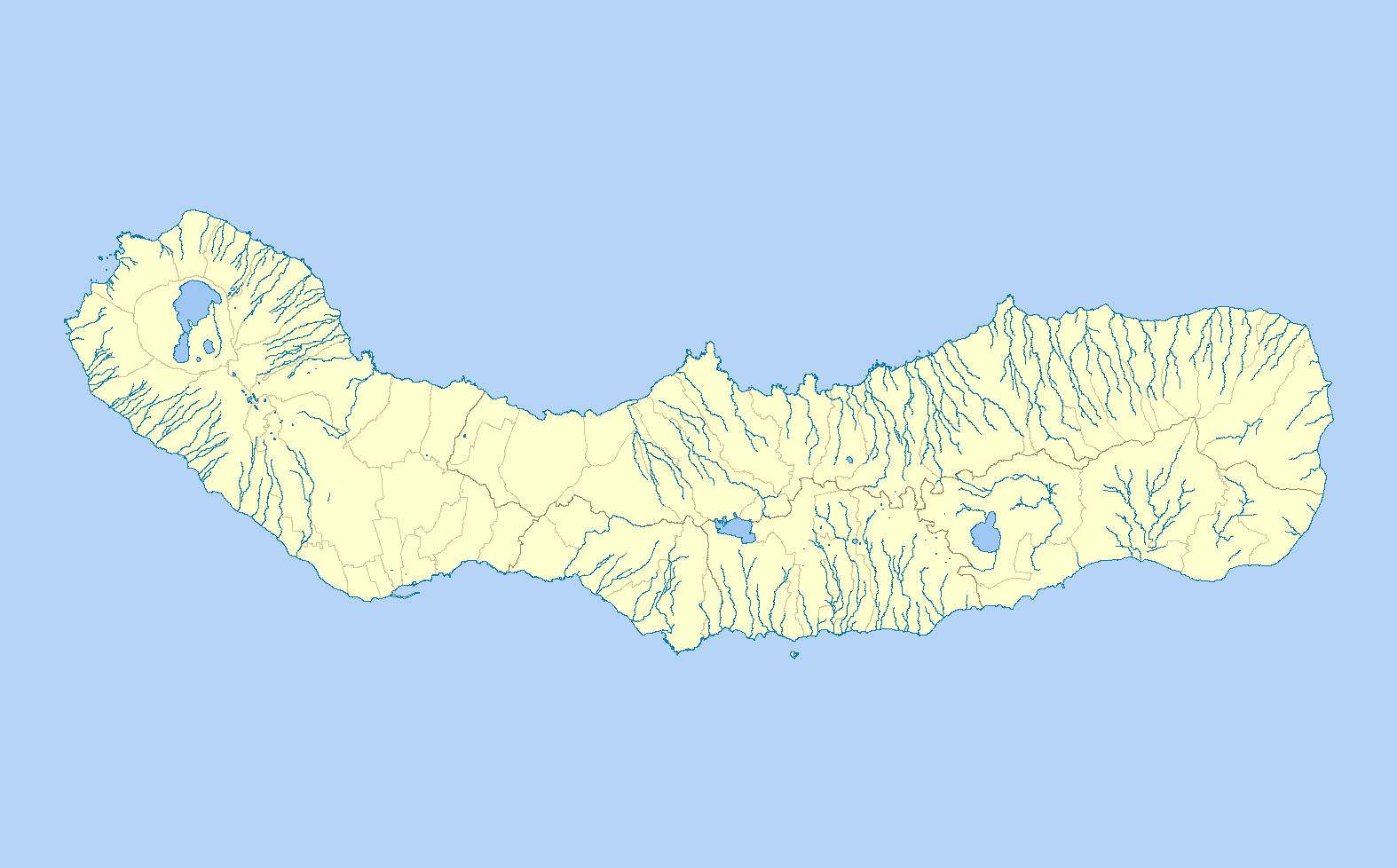
- Location in the Azores Ribeira das Tainhas (São Miguel)
- Coordinates: 37°43′4″N 25°24′39″W
- Country: Portugal
- Auton. region: Azores
- Island: São Miguel
- Municipality: Vila Franca do Campo

Area
  - Total: 9.59 km^{2} (3.70 sq mi)
- Elevation: 39 m (128 ft)

Population (2011)
  - Total: 703
  - Density: 73/km^{2} (190/sq mi)
- Time zone: UTC−01:00 (AZOT)
  - Summer (DST): UTC+00:00 (AZOST)
- Postal code: 9680-519
- Area code: 292
- Patron: Nossa Senhora da Anunciação

Ribeira das Tainhas is a civil parish in the municipality of Vila Franca do Campo in the Portuguese archipelago of the Azores. The population in 2011 was 703, in an area of 9.59 km^{2}.

== History ==
Following its discovery between 1426 and 1439, the island of São Miguel began to be populated under the authority of the Infante D. Henrique, who sent colonists from continental Portugal. Then, during the second half of the 16th century, peoples from Madeira and France began to settle the region of Ribeira das Taínhas. This settlement came after the initial destruction of Vila Franca do Campo by the 1522 earthquake, when the populous were rebuilding.

Little is known of the initial settlers of this region, but there is some evidence that the people initially cultivated a subsistence lifestyle. The economy that development here was concentrated on the cultivation of oranges, and that exportation of many agricultural stuffs and wine occurred through the Porto of Calhau de Areia. Oranges and wine were primarily exported to markets in England, which supported the economy of the parish for many years.

Administratively, the parish was always part of Vila Franca do Campo until 1980, when it was deannexed to form its own se instituiu como freguesia independente.

== Geography ==
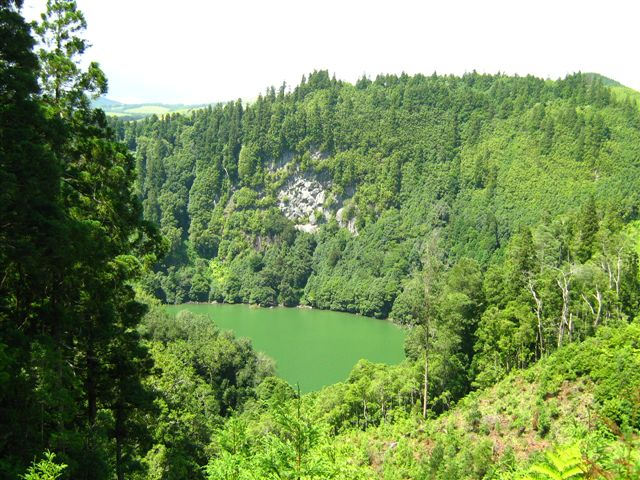
A view of the Lagoa do Congro, an inundated spatter cone in the interior of the parish

Ribeira das Tainhas is the smallest of the civil parishes of Vila Franca do Campo. It shares a short coastal frontier with its neighbouring parishes, and extends into the interior of the island: these include Ponta Garça (to the east) and São Miguel (to the west). Access to Ribeira das Taínhas is accomplished primarily through the Regional E.R.1-1ª roadway and Via-Ráida that connects many of settlements, although a secondary roadway provides connections to its neighbours. In addition, a coastal road (the E.R.3-2ª) beginning in Ribeira Seca at the intersection of the old regional roadway, in the Figueira da Casquete.

Apart from the areas of Amoreiras and São João, that hug the coastal roadway, the parish extends into the interior, into a plain of volcanic spatter cones. The area is represented by the Lagoa do Congro (Lake of the Conger), a former spatter cone, now inundated with water.

Due to the rough cliffs of the region, the parish has few accessible beaches, with the beach of Calhau da Areia being the most distinct. A fine sand beach, Calhau da Areia is un-monitored 100 metres (330 ft) beach with a parking area overlooking the coast frequented by locals. Its situated in a zone at the centre of a group of roads with access to pedestrian trails. The main scenic lookout in the centre of town, the Miradouro da Freguesia, with ample parking picnic areas and green spaces.

== Architecture ==
- Church of Bom Jesus Menino (Portuguese: Igreja Paroquial de Ribeira das Taínhas/Igreja do Bom Jesus Menino), the simple church was begun in 1811 and includes a plain facade frontispiece with oculus over the doorway;

== Culture ==
There are several cultural and secular events that mark the annual calendar, they include: the Festa do Sagrado Coração de Jesus (Feast of the Sacred Heart of Jesus), in the third week of July; annual Concurso de Sopas Este (Soup Festival), on the second weekend of July and on 8 December, the Festa de Nossa Senhora da Conceição (Festival of Our Lady of the Conception).
