= List of beaches in the Azores =

The following is a list of the prominent beaches and or tidal swimming areas in the islands of the Azores:

== Corvo ==
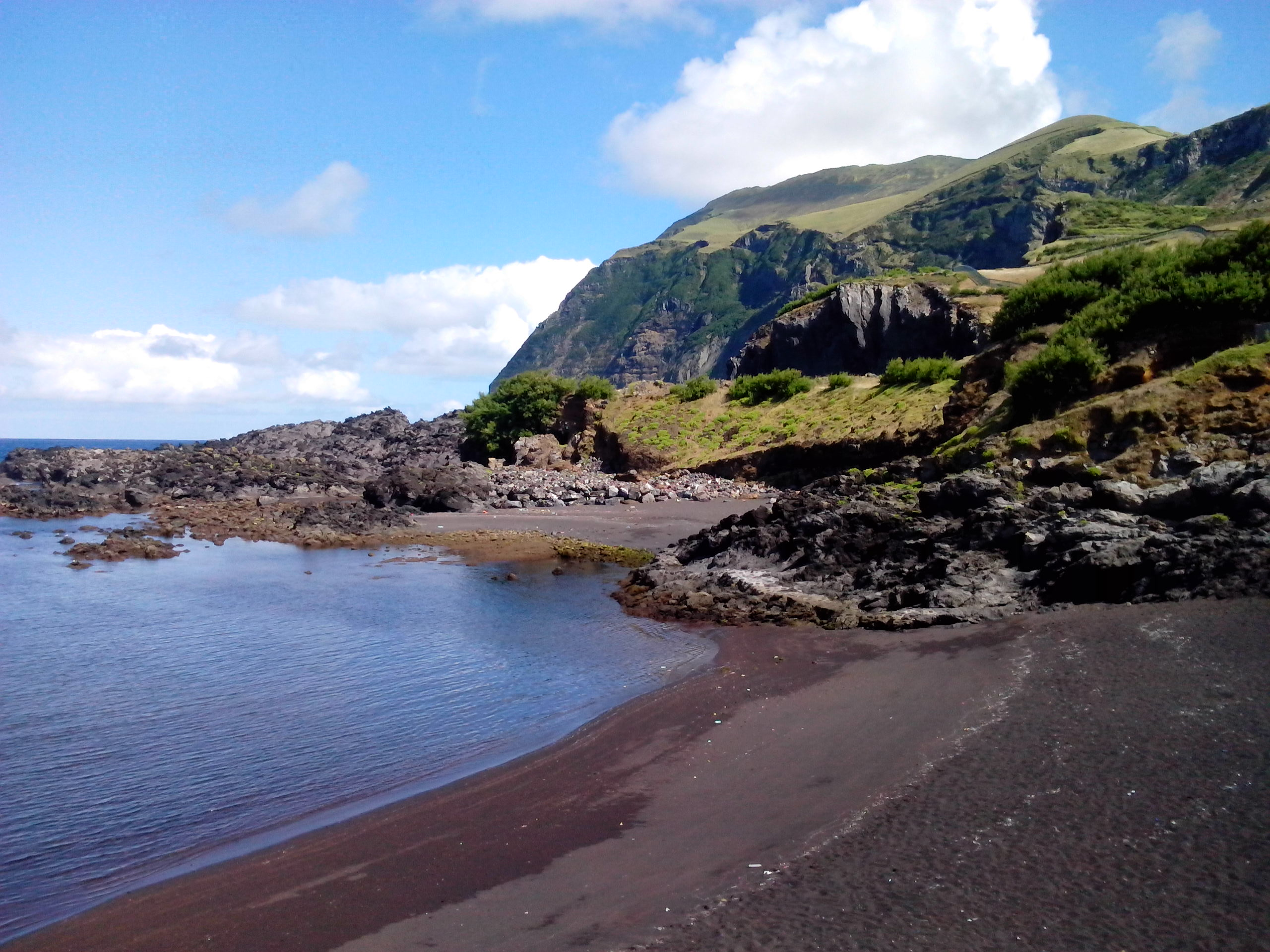
The main island beach, the Portinho da Areia was once a small, sandy port, hence its name

- Beach of Portinho da Areia

== Faial ==
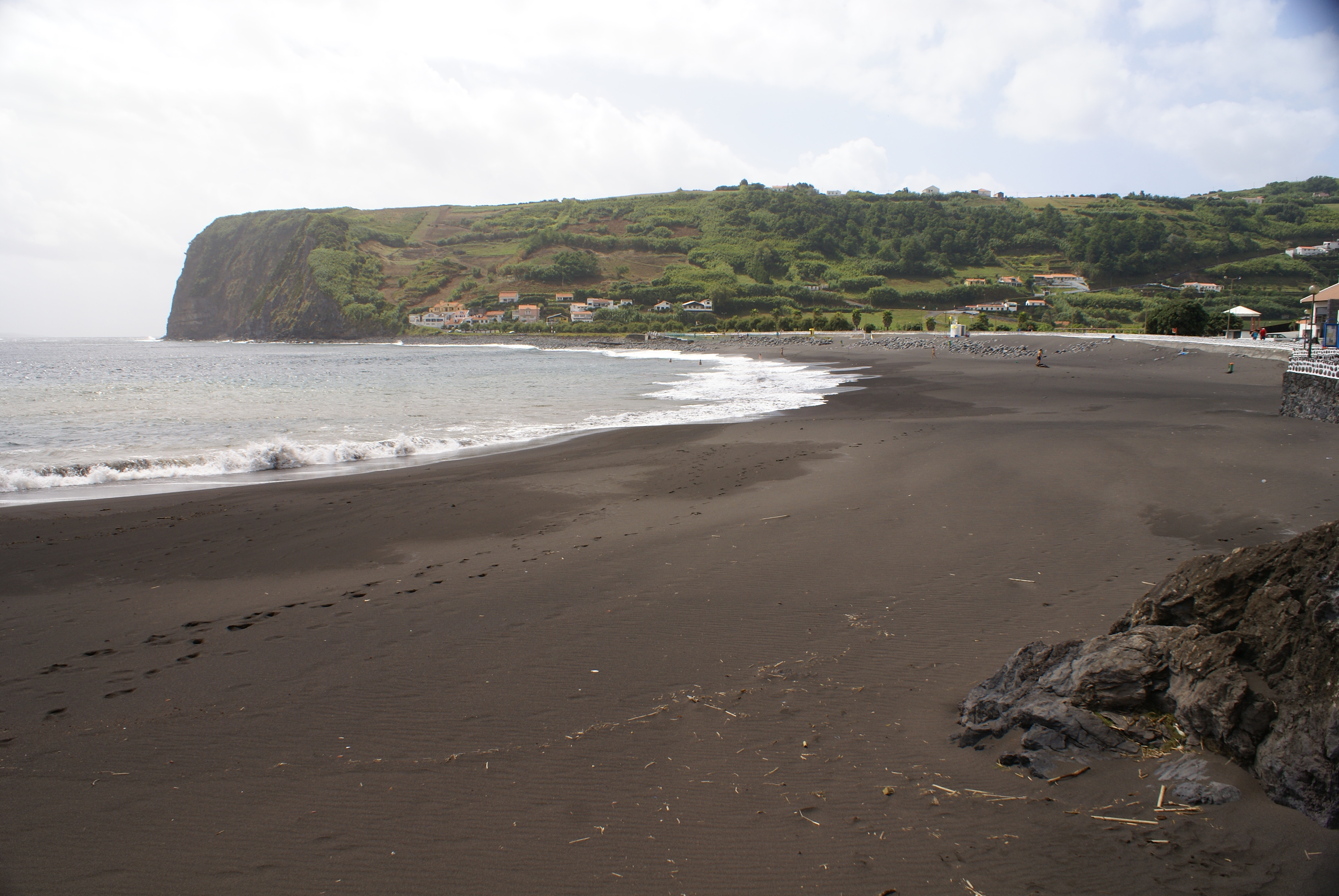
The black sand of the beach of Praia do Almoxarife

- Beach of Alagoa (Conceição) (Praia da Conceicao)
- Beach of Fajã
- Beach of Porto Pim (Praia de Porto Pim, Horta)
- Beach of Praia do Almoxarife (Praia das Cinco Ribeiras, Horta)
- Praia do Norte
- Tidal pools of Feteira (Praia da Feteira)
- Tidal pools of Varadouro (Praia do Varadouro, Horta)

== Flores ==
- Tidal pools of Santa Cruz das Flores (Piscinas naturais de Santa Cruz das Flores)

== Graciosa ==
- Beach of São Mateus (Praia de Sao Mateus)
- Swimming Area of Barro Vermelho (Zona Balnear do Barro Vermelho)
- Swimming Area of Carapacho (Zona Balnear do Carapacho)
- Swimming Area of Santa Cruz (Zona Balnear de Santa Cruz)

== Pico ==
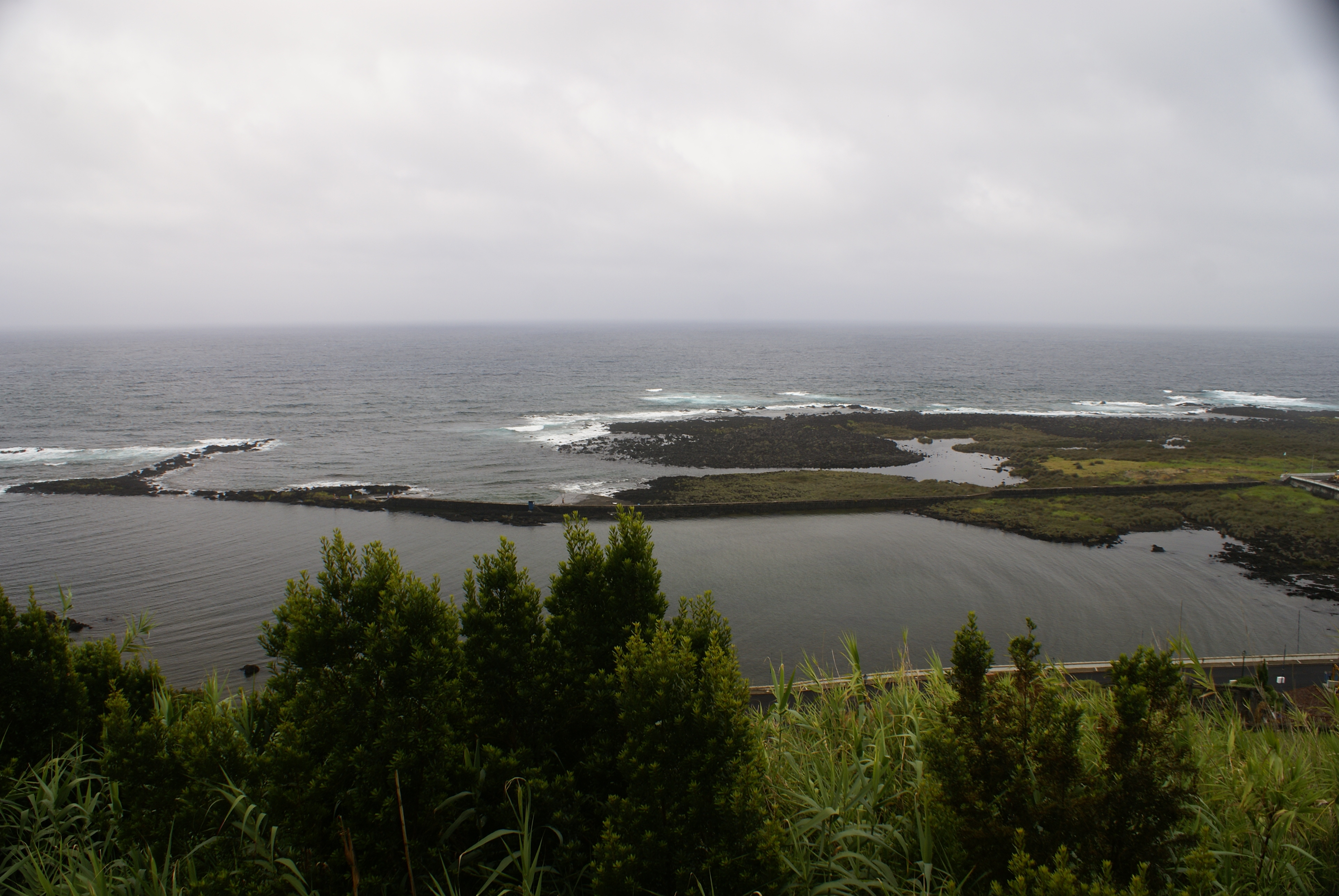
The tidal pools of the Bay of Lajes, a multi-use site for recreational and protection of migratory maritime species

- Praia da Baixa da Ribeirinha
- Praia da Maré
- Praia da Poça das Mujas
- Praia das Poças da Manhenha
- Praia do Canto da Areia
- Prainha do Galeão
- Swimming and Leisure Area of Arinhas (Zona Balnear e de Lazer das Arinhas)
- Tidal pools of Areia Funda
- Tidal pools of Areia Larga (Praia da Areia Larga)
- Tidal pools of Baía das Lajes (Praia da Baia das Lajes)
- Tidal pools of Baía de Canas (Praia da Baia de Canas)
- Tidal pools of Fonte
- Tidal pools of Formosinha
- Tidal pools of Furna de Santo António (Piscinas Naturais da Furna de Santo Antonio)
- Tidal pools of Laje do Vigário (Praia da Laje do Vigario)
- Tidal pools of Poça Branca (Zona de Lazer da Poca Branca)
- Tidal pools of Praia Arcos
- Tidal pools of Praia da Barca
- Tidal pools of Praia do Cabrito

== Santa Maria ==
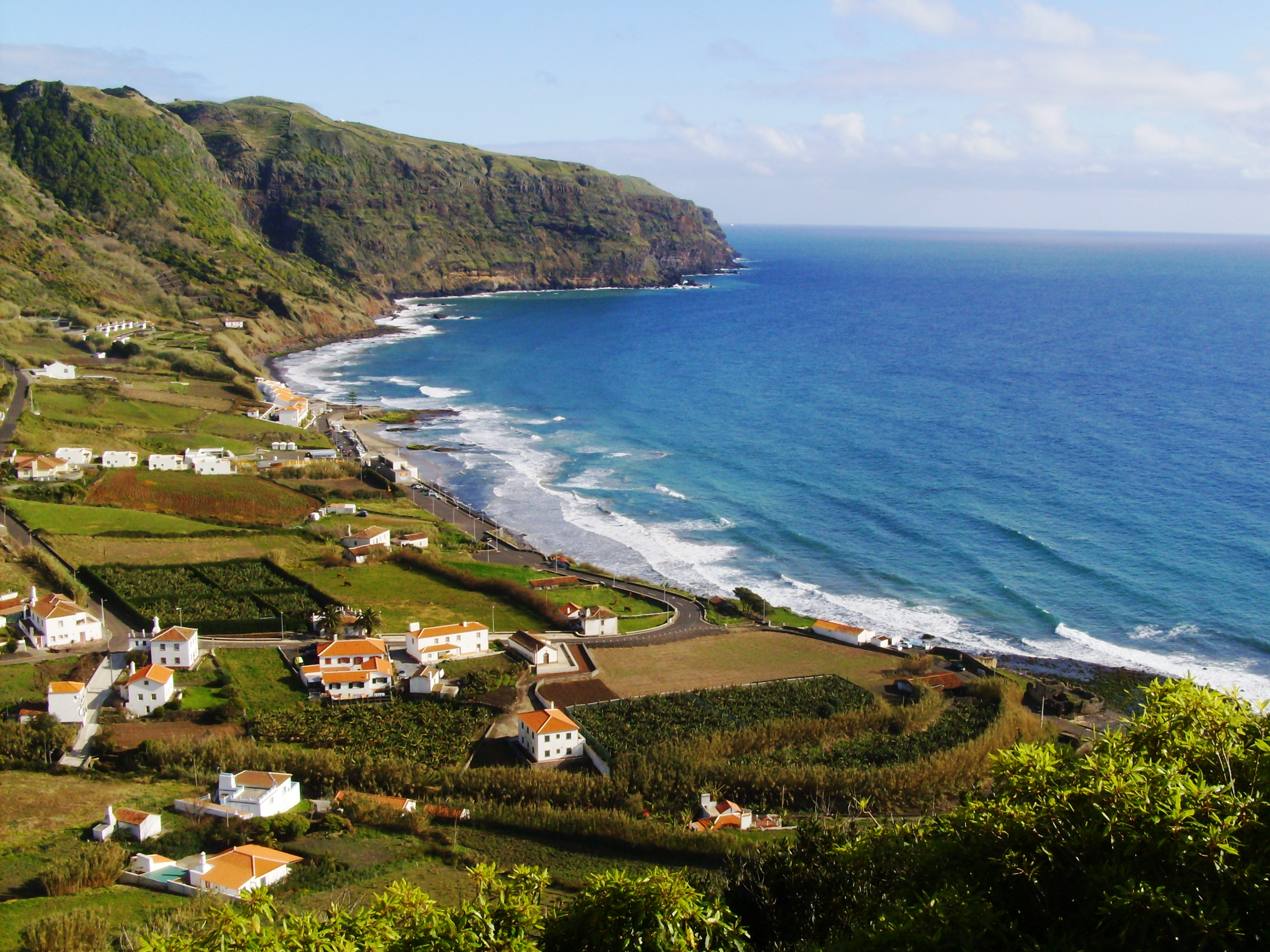
The scenic view of the Praia Formoso, the longest white sand beach in the archipelago of the Azores

- Beach of Praia Formosa (Praia da Formosa, Vila do Porto) (Praia Formosa)
- Swimming Area of Anjos (Praia dos Anjos, Vila do Porto)
- Swimming Area of Maia (Praia da Maia, Vila do Porto)
- Swimming Area of São Lourenço (Praia de São Lourenço, Vila do Porto)

== São Miguel ==
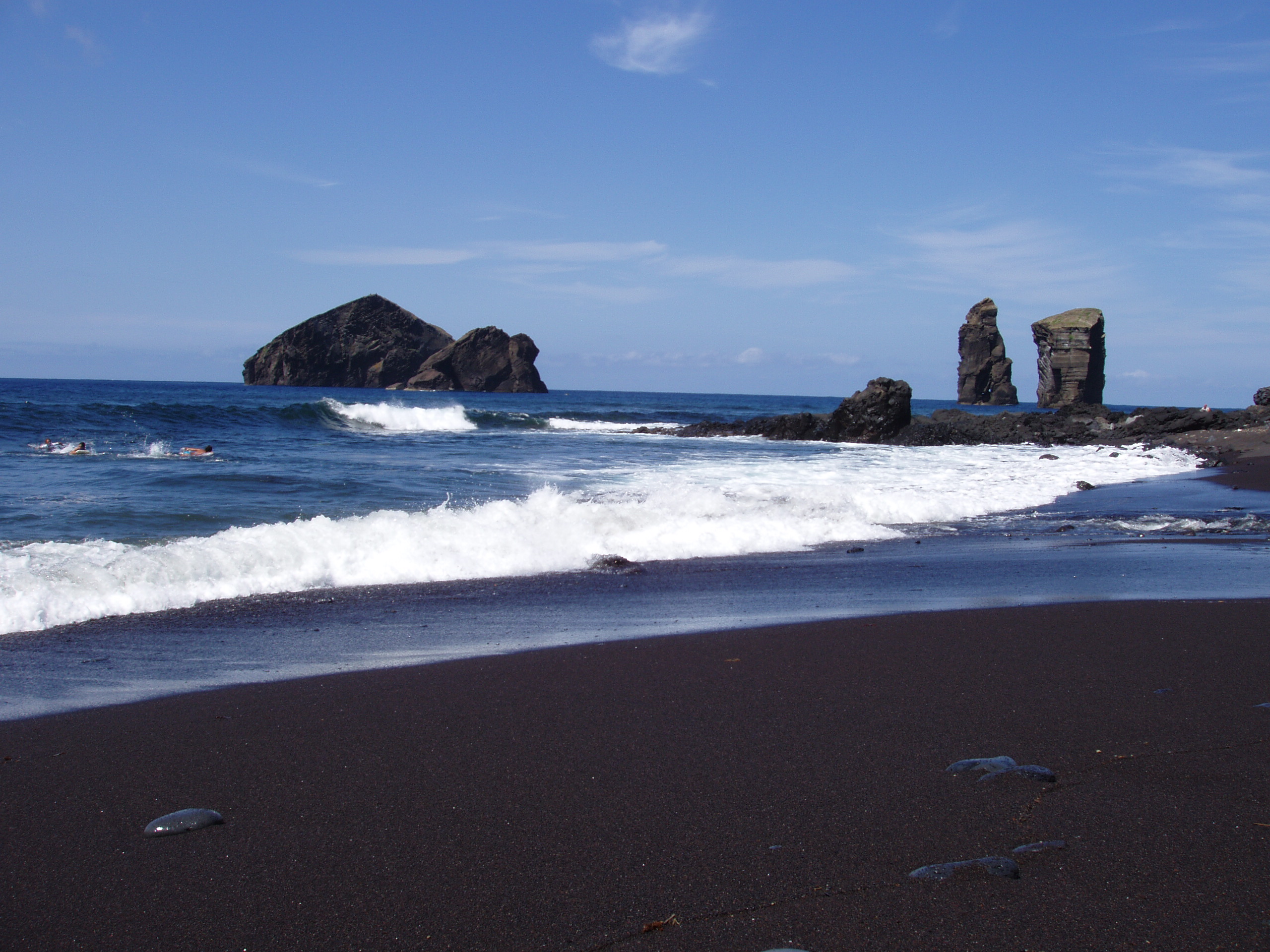
The dark sand beach of Mosteiros, with the iconic islets in the distance

- Beach of Água de Alto (Praia de Agua de Alto, Vila Franca do Campo)
- Beach of Amora (Praia da Amora)
- Beach of Baixa da Areia (Praia da Baixa da Areia)
- Beach of Corpo Santo (Praia de Corpo Santo, Vila Franca do Campo) (Praia do Corpo Santo)
- Beach of Degredo (Praia do Degredo)
- Beach of Fogo (Beach of Ribeira Quente) (Praia do Fogo, Povoação)
- Beach of Leopoldina (Praia Leopoldina)
- Beach of Lombo Gordo (Praia do Lombo Gordo)
- Beach of Moinhos (Praia dos Moinhos, Ribeira Grande) (Praia Moinhos)
- Beach of Milícias (Praia Grande) (Praia das Milicias, Ponta Delgada) (Praia da Milicias)
- Beach of Mosteiros (Praia dos Mosteiros, Ponta Delgada)
- Beach of Pedreira (Praia da Pedreira)
- Beach of Pópulo (Praía Pequena) (Praia do Populo, Ponta Delgada)
- Beach of Povoação (Praia da Povoação)
- Beach of Rabo de Peixe (Praia do Rabo de Peixe, Ribeira Grande)
- Beach of Santa Bárbara (Praia de Santa Barbara)
- Beach of Vila Franca Islet (Praia do Ilheu de Vila Franca, Vila Franca do Campo)
- Beach of Vinha da Areia (Praia da Vinha da Areia, Vila Franca do Campo)
- Beach of Viola (Praia da Viola)
- Beach Prainha de Água de Alto (Praia da Agua de Alto) (Praia de Agua de Alto)
- Praia da Caloura (Lagoa)
- Praia da Rainha (Vila Franca do Campo)
- Praia de Sao Pedro
- Praia dos Porto de Maio (Ribeira Grande)
- Praia dos Porto Formoso (Ribeira Grande)
- Praia dos Trinta Reis (Vila Franca do Campo)
- Tidal pools of Calhetas (Praia das Calhetas, Ribeira Grande)
- Tidal pools of Lagoa (Zona Balnear da Lagoa)
- Tidal pools of Ponta da Galera (Caloura)
- Tidal pools of São Roque (Praia de Sao Roque, Ponta Delgada)

== São Jorge ==
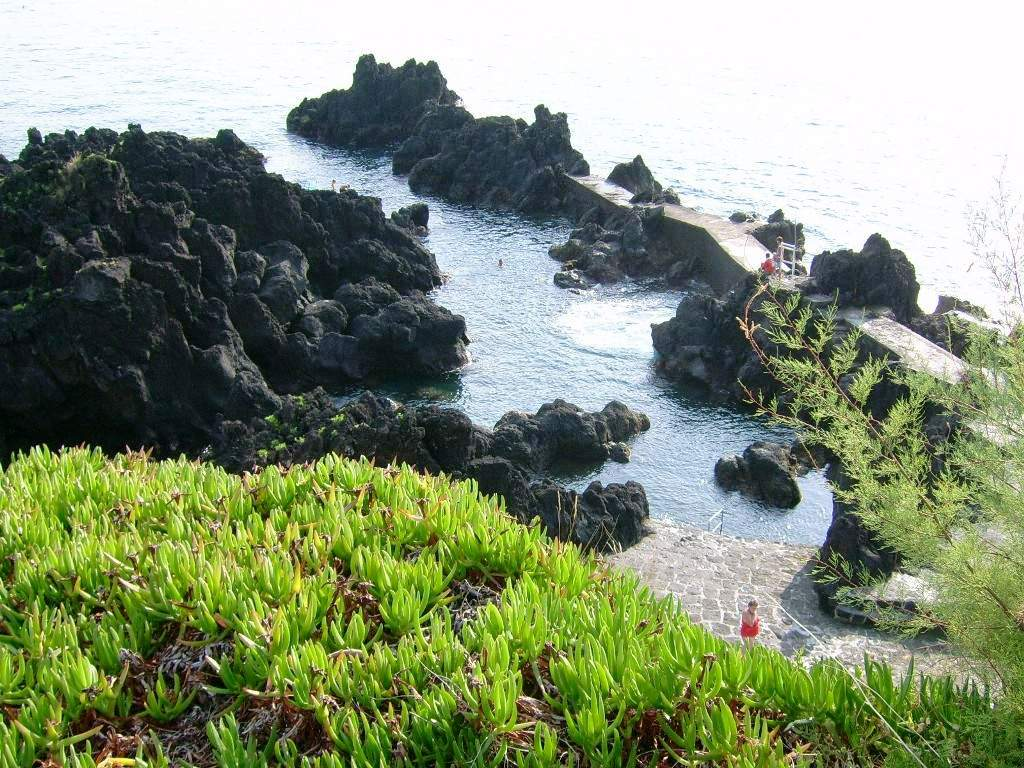
A view of the swimming of Fajã Grande in the municipality of Calheta

- Beach of Velas (Praia das Velas)
- Cais da Faja das Almas
- Cais da Faja do Ouvidor
- Poca Simao Dias
- Swimming Area of Fajã Grande
- Swimming Area of Porto dos Terreiros (Praia do Porto dos Terreiros (Baia))
- Swimming Area of Praia da Preguiça

== Terceira ==
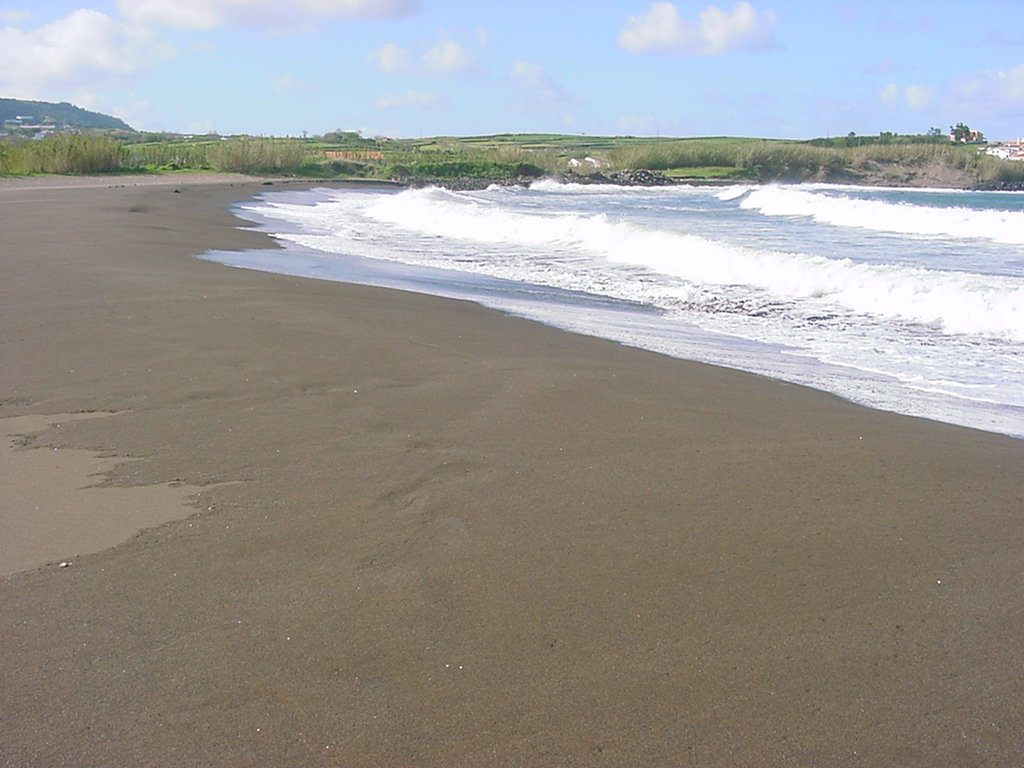
Beach of Riviera in the municipality of Praia da Vitória, Terceira, in the Açores

- Alagadouros (Biscoitos)
- Beach of Biscoitos (Praia dos Biscoitos (Baia), Praia da Vitoria)
- Beach of Cinco Ribeiras (Praia das Cinco Ribeiras (Baia), Angra do Heroismo)
- Beach of Escaleiras ((Praia das Escaleiras, Angra do Heroismo/Praia da Vitoria)
- Beach of Fanal (Baia do Fanal) (Fanal (Baia))
- Beach of Mercês (Baia das Merces (Baia))
- Beach of Oficiais (Praia dos Oficiais, Praia da Vitoria)
- Beach of Portas da Prata (Praia das Portas da Prata)
- Beach of Porto Martins (Praia de Porto Martins/Praia do Porto Martins, Angra do Heroismo/Praia da Vitoria)
- Beach of Praia Grande (Praia Grande, Angra do Heroismo / Praia Grande (Praia da Vitoria))
- Beach of Prainha (Angra do Heroísmo) (Angra do Heroismo/Praia da Vitoria)
- Beach of Refugo (Baia do Refugio)
- Beach of Riviera (Praia da Riviera, Praia da Vitoria)
- Beach of Salga (Praia da Salga, Angra do Heroismo)
- Beach of Salgueiros (Praia dos Salgueiros (Baia), Angra do Heroismo)
- Beach of the Sargents (Praia dos Sargentos, Angra do Heroismo/Praia da Vitoria)
- Beach of Villa Maria (Baia de Villa Maria (Baia))
- Cais da Figueirinha
- Poca dos Frades
- Porto da Vila Nova
- Swimming area of Negrito (Praia do Negrito (Baia), Angra do Heroismo)
- Swimming area of Quatro Ribeiras (Praia das Quatro Ribeiras/Zona Balnear das Quatro Ribeiras (Baia), Angra do Heroismo)
- Wharf of Silveira (Praia da Silveira (Baia), Angra do Heroismo)

== See also ==
- List of bays in the Azores
- List of beaches in Portugal
