= Água de Alto =

Civil parish in Vila Franca do Campo

- Civil parish
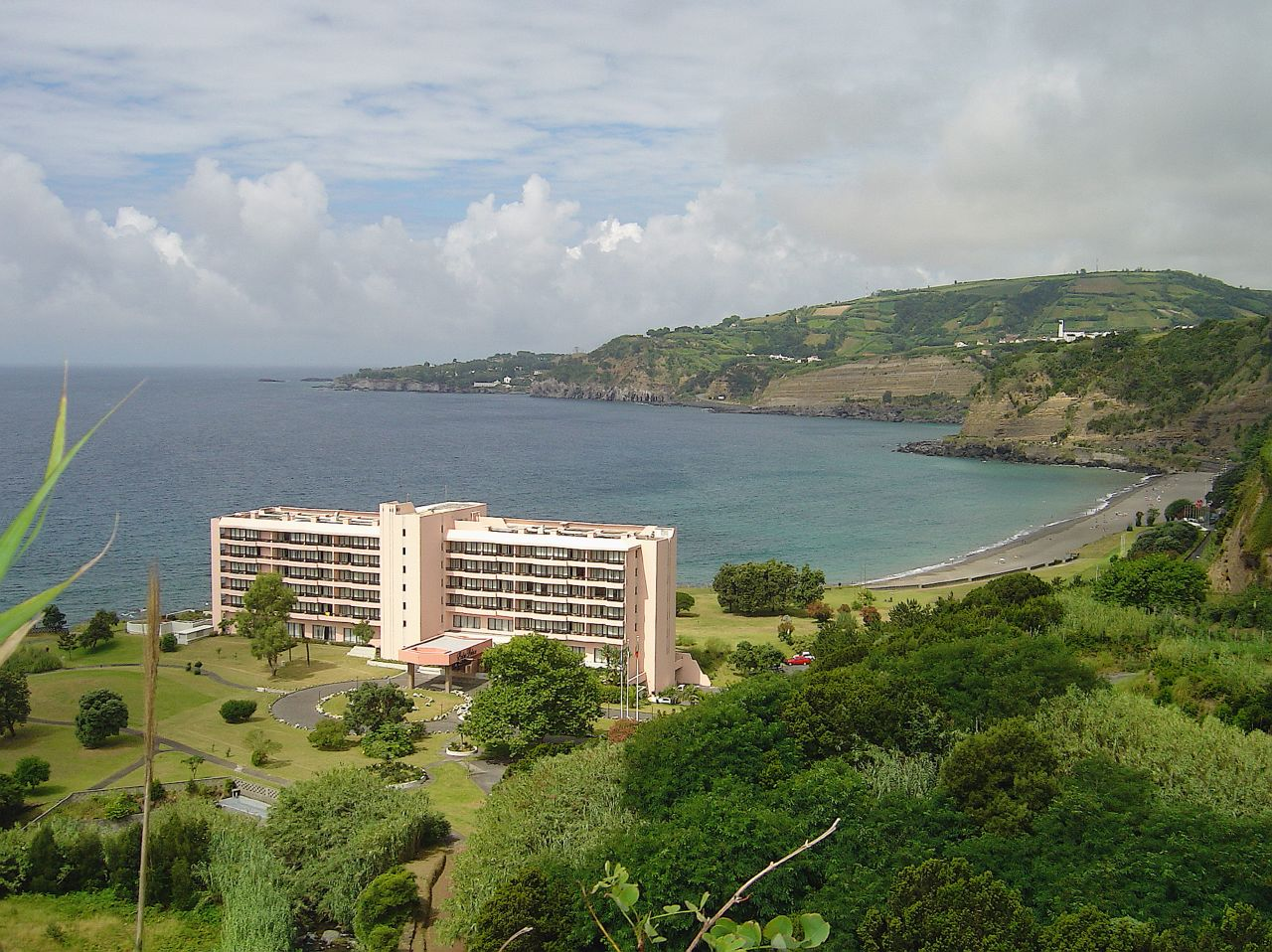
- The beach of Água de Alto, one of the larger beaches along the southern coastal frontier

- Location of the civil parish of Água de Alto in the municipality of Vila Franca do Campo
- Coordinates: 37°43′10″N 25°27′20″W
- Country: Portugal
- Auton. region: Azores
- Island: São Miguel
- Municipality: Vila Franca do Campo
- Established: Parish: c. 1602; Civil parish: c. 1908

Area
  - Total: 18.41 km^{2} (7.11 sq mi)
- Elevation: 74 m (243 ft)

Population (2011)
  - Total: 1,788
  - Density: 97.12/km^{2} (251.5/sq mi)
- Time zone: UTC−01:00 (AZOT)
  - Summer (DST): UTC+00:00 (AZOST)
- Postal code: 9680-301
- Area code: 292
- Patron: Nossa Senhora da Anunciação
- Website: Official website

Água de Alto is a civil parish in the municipality of Vila Franca do Campo on the island of São Miguel in the Portuguese archipelago of the Azores. The population in 2011 was 1,788, in an area of 18.41 km^{2}.

== History ==
According to historian Gaspar Frutuoso, little is known about this parish. What is known is that during the 15th century, a hermitage in this region sheltered a hospital for lepers, named Lazareto (after the saint São Lázaro, or Gafaria). Following Gaspar Frutuoso's reference, the community of Água de Alto consisted of thirty houses, administered by Father Baltazar Faguntes.

The parish's name had its origin in the 30 metres (98 ft) waterfall in the vicinity of the Ribeira do Degredo. Owing to water falling from a height, the region began to be referred as Água D´Alto, which is literally water from the heights.

During the early decades of the 16th century, the residents of Água d'Alto divided their days with tilling the land, collecting woad and fishing. On one day, close to evening, the peasants returned to their homes, where the women had prepared meager meals. Unbeknownst to the residents, a boat carrying pirates, likely Algerian in origin, neared the beach. In the shadows of the night, they passed unseen to the local sentries, and surprised the local populace. They sacked, maltreated and injured the men, violated the women, while another group advanced into the interior led by a drummer, who frightened the citizenry with his drumming. While the sound scared and terrified the women and children, the pirates continued their task of pillaging and destruction. The sentries, discovering finally what was happening, launched boats and knights on horseback to attack the pirates. But, the pirates returned to their launches and escaped, except for the drummer, who continued to drum. When he realized, it was too late, he drummed louder so that no one would cross him. At the end of the night, the drummer quieted his drumming, but immediately the townsfolk heard a scream: the drummer had fallen into a cavern. Although they could not find the body, the settlers would later report that in the evenings they were able to hear the drum. The cavern then became known as the Grota do Tamborileiro, because the spirit of the drummer continued to play his drum.

In 1602, Bishop D. Gerónimo visited the parish, finding the parish small and maltreated, and ordered the transference of the priest to São Pedro. The hospital that also functioned here, was also transferred closer to the sea, constructed in the area known as Degredo, which referred to the fact that many of the lepers were left to this zone.

With the growth of the population, in 1832, the settlers petitioned the Bishop of Angra to authorize the institution of a sanctuary, where they could place the holy sacraments.

For a long time the settlement was part of São Pedro, and was promoted to status of civil parish in 1908, during the government of João Franco.

== Geography ==
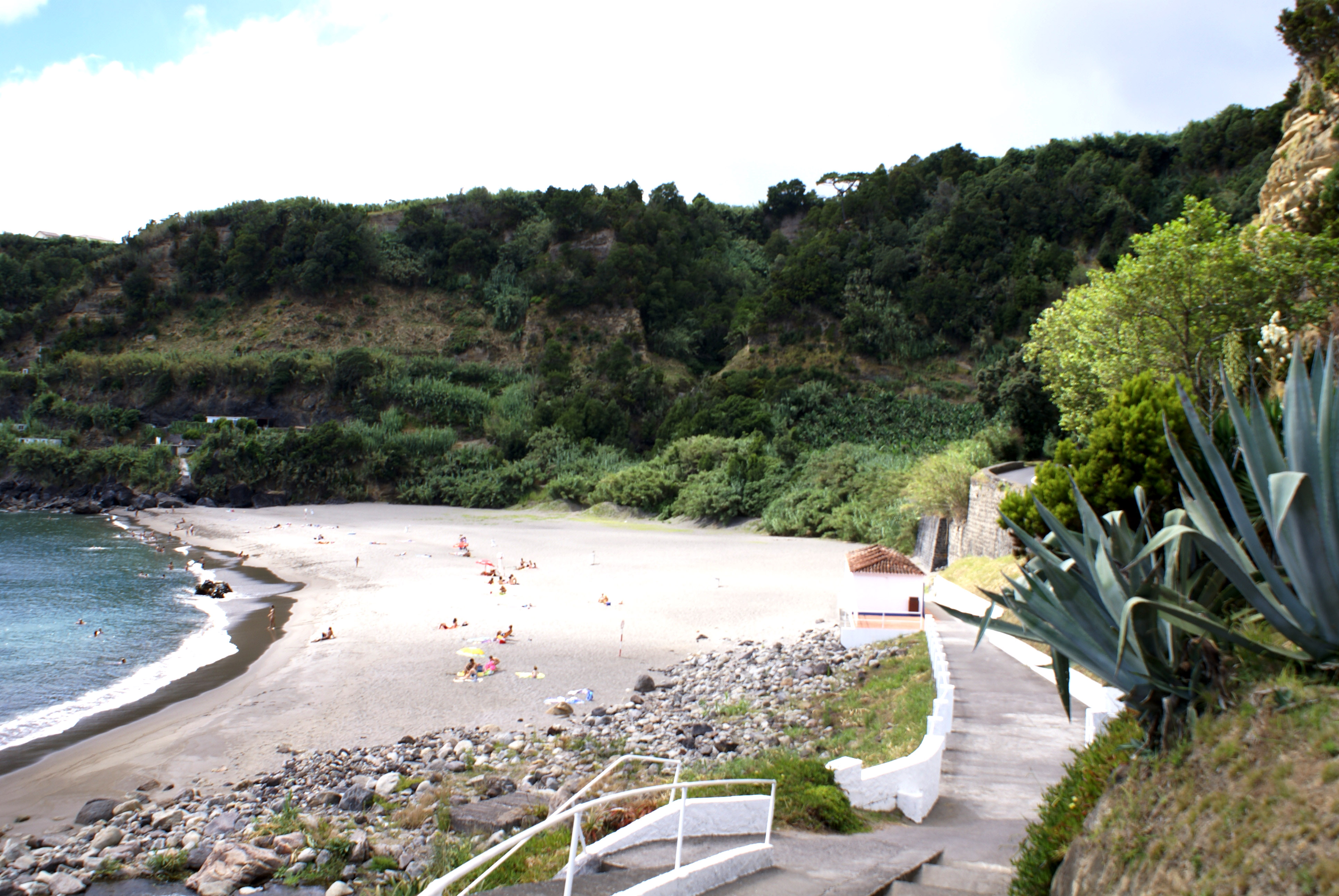
The "small" beach of Água de Alto, along the southern border with Ribeira Chã

Population of Água d'Alto (1911 - 2001)
Year	Pop.	±%
1911	1,584	—
1930	1,689	+6.6%
1990	1,624	−3.8%
2001	1,734	+6.8%

Água de Alto is situated on the southern coast of the island of São Miguel. It is located along the regional roadway E.R.1-1ª, that encircles the island, connecting the municipality of Vila Franca do Campo with Ponta Delgada by way of the community of Lagoa along the southern coast.

== Economy ==
Economically, the primary sector is still the most important activities in the parish, however, its relevance has steadily declined over time. The pastures of the parish are dominated by cattle ranching and dairy herding, with agriculture that includes the cultivation of potato, corn and other vegetables are occurring in the small parcels. Complementing these activities are secondary sector industries associated with construction, painting and carpentry. Trade and commerce are based on subsistence and supports primarily the local market.

== Architecture ==
- Church of São Lázaro (Portuguese: Igreja Paroquial de Água de Alto/Igreja de São Lázaro), the church was begun following the testament of João Afonso, das Grotas Fundas, in 1511
