= Convent of São Francisco (Vila Franca do Campo) =

Convent in Azores, Portugal

- Convento do São Francisco
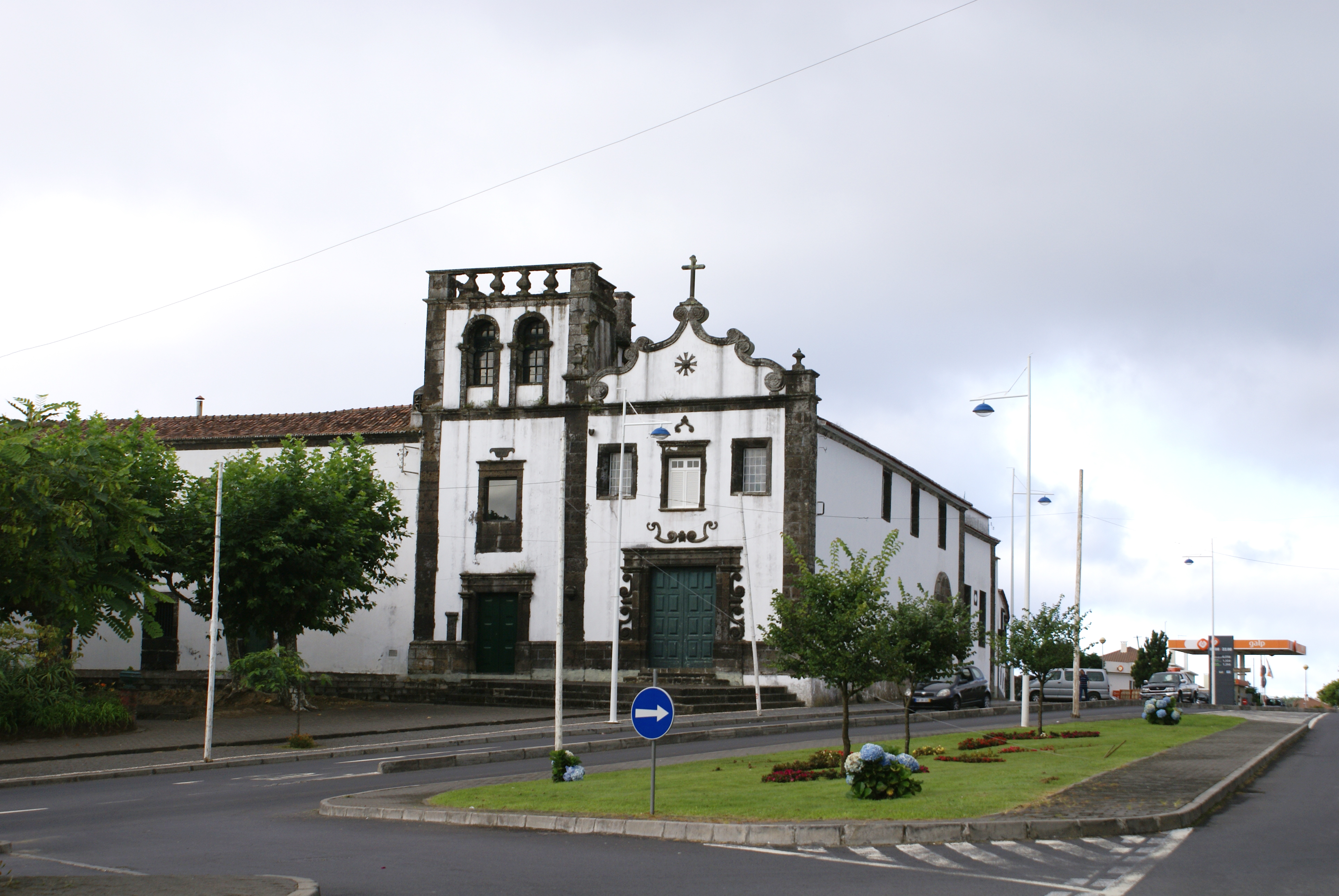
- The convent and church of Nossa Senhora do Rosário

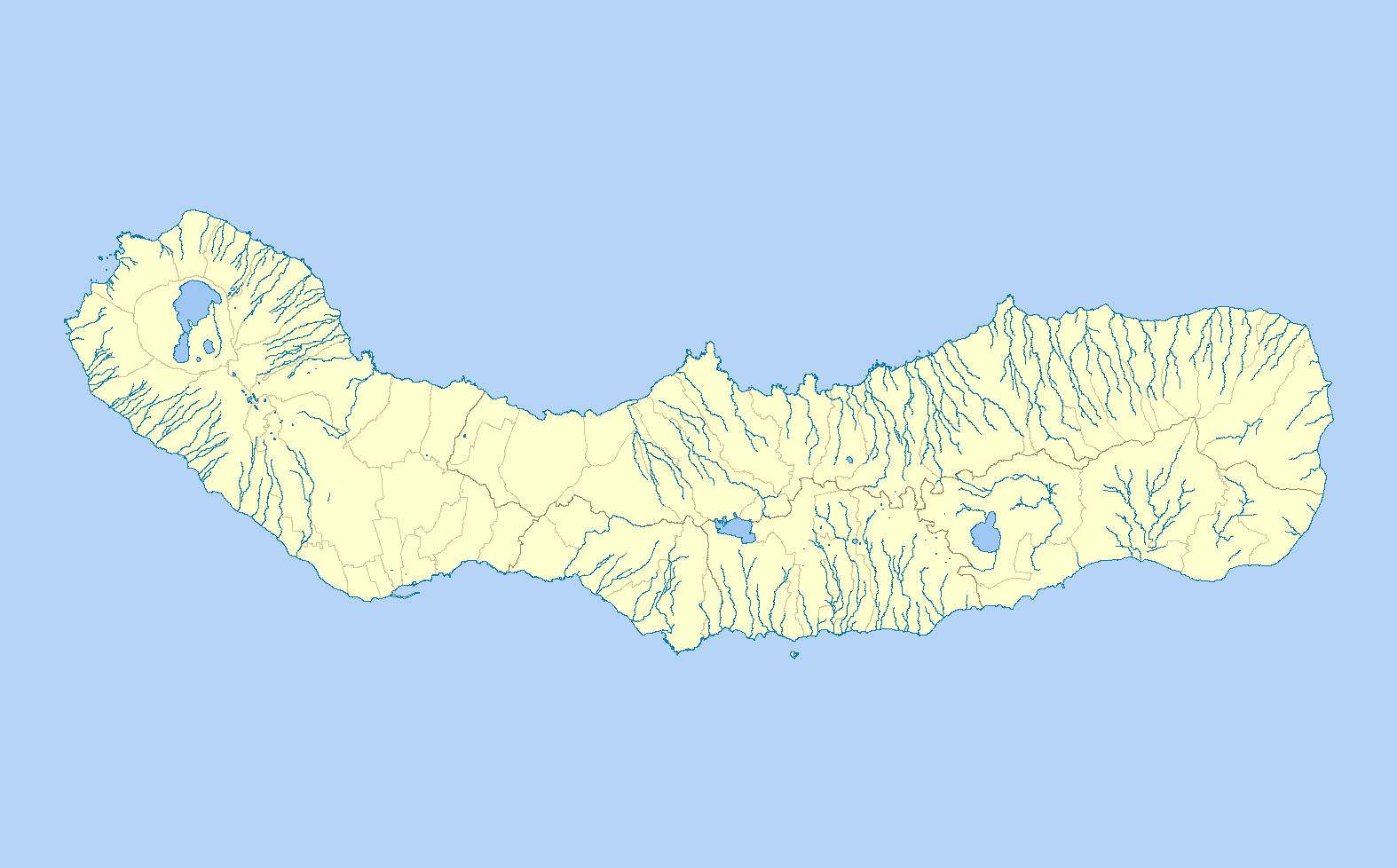
- Location on the island of São Miguel
- Interactive map of Convent of São Francisco

Monastery information
- Other name: Convent of Our Lady of the Rosary
- Order: Franciscan
- Established: 15th century
- Dedication: Nossa Senhora do Rosário; Francis of Assisi

Architecture
- Status: Property of Public Interest
- Heritage designation: Resolution of the President of the Regional Government, 221/1996; JORAA, Série I, 39, 26 September 1996
- Style: Baroque, using basalt, wood, and tile
- Completion date: 16th century

Site
- Location: São Pedro, Vila Franca do Campo, São Miguel, Azores, Portugal
- Coordinates: 37°42′57.8″N 25°26′27.9″W
- Website: conventosaofrancisco.net

The Convent of São Francisco (Portuguese: Convento de São Francisco), also known as the Convent of Saint Francis of Assisi or the Convent of Our Lady of the Rosary, is a convent in the civil parish of São Pedro, in the municipality of Vila Franca do Campo, in the Portuguese archipelago of the Azores. Originally a monastic building housing Franciscan friars, the building was converted into a lodgings at the turn of the century.

== History ==
The convent had its beginnings in a Franciscan retreat that existed at the end of the 15th century. The current complex was constructed following the 1522 Vila Franca earthquake and landslides that destroyed the town, to replace and house the Franciscan clergy that lived alongside the hilltop of Senhora do Paz.

The decision to construct this building was issued on 5 July 1524, signed by John III of Portugalin Évora, who contributed funds for the project.

The construct of the convent was mentioned in the work friar Agostinho de Monte Alverne, who indicated that the "famous" church was built in 1525, alongside the convent and an orange orchard. The outline of this church was, according to Gaspar Frutuoso, due to the friar Afonso de Toledo, the same that witnessed the effects of the 1522 earthquake.

The church was dedicated to Nossa Senhora do Rosário, the monks receiving a pulpit from the parochial church of Vila Franca. At that time, during the early 18th century, the older spaces were converted into the main house and refectory. In 1723, Francisco Afonso de Chaves e Melo, registered that there 30 friars at the convent, which was dedicated to schooling of the local children. In fact, the conventual school attracted students from most of the island and, even, some from the island of Santa Maria, resulting in its nickname as the Coimbra Micaelense.

In 1832, the friars were expulsed from the convent and the building was put on sale: it was purchased by the Viscount of Praia, that was later resold to Simplício Gago da Câmara, on 17 July 1839 (from Ponta Delgada), who used the building as a summer home.

By the end of the 1980s, the building was resold, and in 1991 work began to convert the building into tourist lodgings. A fire destroyed the pavement and second-floor ceilings of this convent sometime in the 1990s, including most of the restored annexes. Ironically, the fire helped to expose a stone archway, in the area used as a dining area, that once provided access to the southern terrace (toward the sea). Between 1991 and 1995, there were investments in the site to restore the building, under supervision of architect Teresa Nunes and with funds from the SIFIT (Sistema de Incentivos Financeiros ao Investimento Turístico) program. The building was re-inaugurated in 1995, and continues to function as a tourist residence.

== Architecture ==
Situated in an urban area, alongside the old regional road into the town of Vila Franca, the convent is sited on a gentle hill and adapted to the slopes. The southern lateral terrace has a view to the sea, and islet of Vila Franca, while the body of the convent and church align parallel to the coast.

A rectangular plan, the single-nave church and chapel, which is lower and straight, includes a left lateral belltower, that extends into the convent. These exterior surfaces are plastered and painted white, with the corners, frames, friezes, pillars and cornices are in simple basalt stone. The curvilinear frontispiece of the church, includes sculpted stone, crowned by a Latin cross surmounting an acroterion and small urns, over parallel plinths above the corners. This facade is broken by main portico, surmounted by friezes and flanked by rounded elements with three windows. The bell-tower has two registers, the first with portico surmounted by frieze and cornice, over a square window with decorative elements. The second register has two belfries with rounded openings and pillars, terminated by cornice, balustrades and acroterions on the corners.

The convent building is marked by rectangular doors and simple frames, while the second floor is punctuated by rectangular windows, similar to those on the church/chapel. The two-story cloister, the first of arcades and pillars, and the second, enclosed with rectangular garden windows, decorated with cornices and simple platband, capped by corners and gargoyles. In the centre of the courtyard is a faceted tank/fountain. The wings of the cloister are paved in basalt slabs, and covered by vaulted ceiling, and opens onto the building dependencies by rounded archways over pilasters. There are 10 large rooms, that correspond to the old cells, that have been expanded to include fireplaces and bathrooms, with wooden floors. The larger, common spaces are covered in stone slabs.
