= Vila Franca Islet =

Islet in the Azores, Portugal

Native name: Ilhéu de Vila Franca do Campo
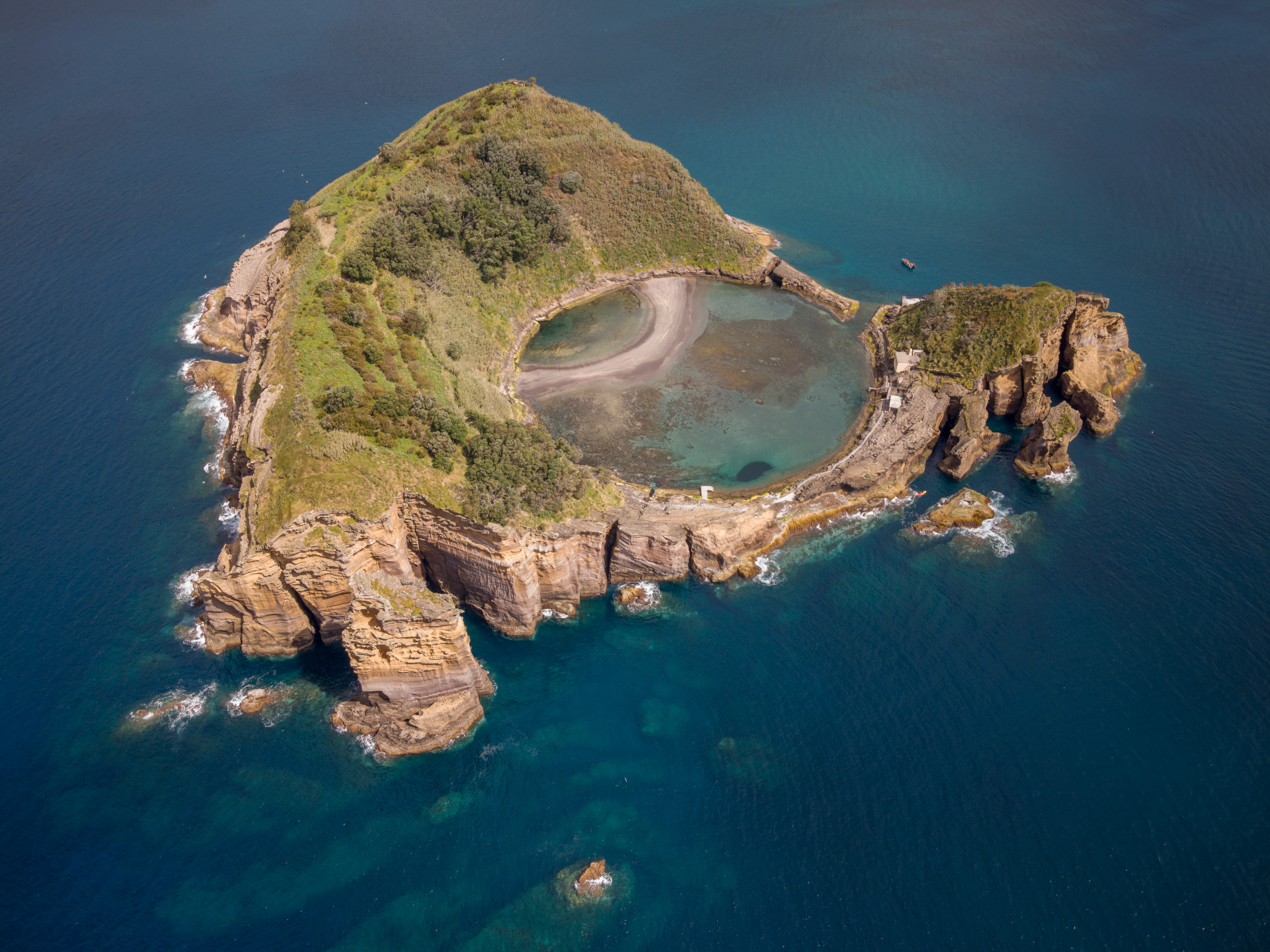
- Vila Franca Islet from the southeast

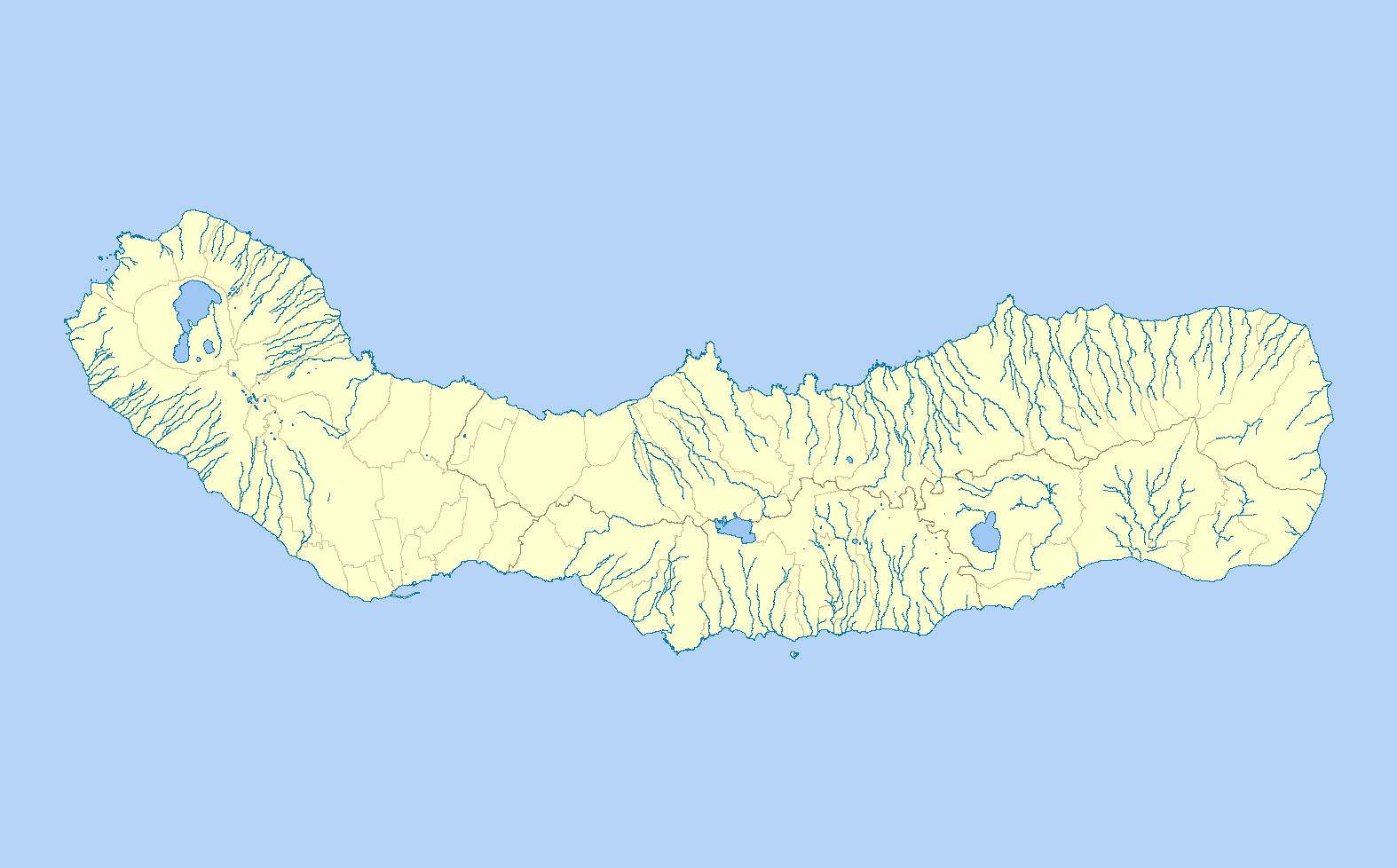
- Location of the islet off the coast of São Miguel

Geography
- Location: Atlantic Ocean
- Coordinates: 37°42′20″N 25°26′36″W
- Area: 0.05 km^{2} (0.019 sq mi)

Administration
- Portugal
- Autonomous region: Azores
- Island: São Miguel
- Municipality: Vila Franca do Campo

Demographics
- Population: uninhabited

Vila Franca Islet (Portuguese: Ilhéu de Vila Franca do Campo; ) is a vegetated uninhabited islet located off the south-central coast of the island of São Miguel in the Portuguese archipelago of the Azores, lying south of Vila Franca do Campo. The entire islet and surrounding waters constitute a protected nature reserve, while remaining a popular destination for swimming and cliff diving. However, in 2025 swimming was prohibited for conservation efforts on the protected Nature Reserve.

== The Islet's Seasonal Schedule ==
- From June 15th to April 14th the Islet is open for visiting inside, exclusively with government-certified local companies in Vila Franca do Campo - for walking nature and wildlife interpretation tours (swimming on the islet has been disallowed since 2025).
- From April 15th to June 14th the Islet's inside is closed for visiting, due to local conservation policy protecting local species reproduction and nursing.

The island is accessible by boat year round.

== Geography ==
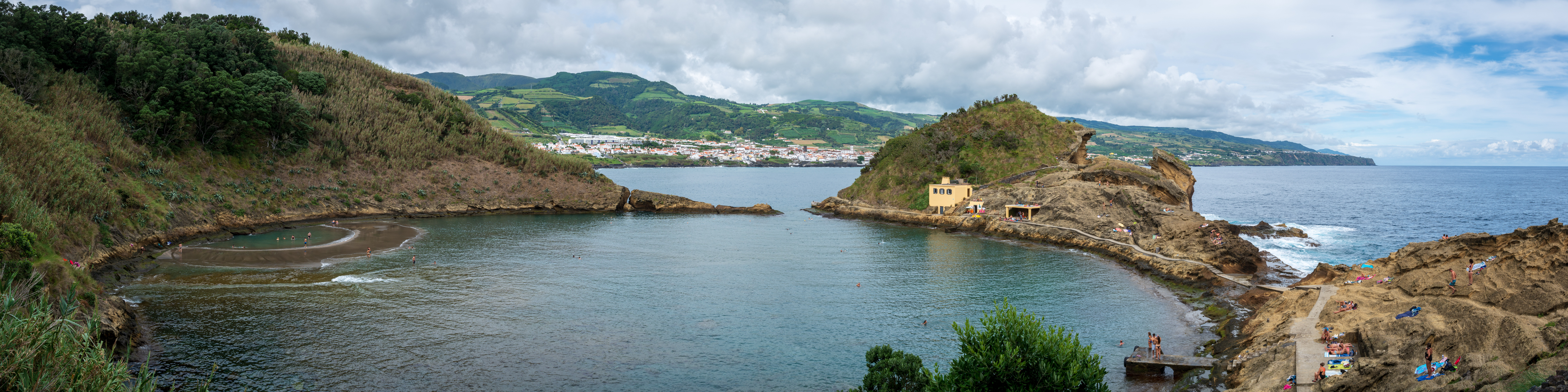
Panoramic view of the islet's central crater

Vila Franca Islet is the exposed remains of a Surtseyan volcanic cone of phreatomagmatic origin heavily eroded by the sea and seismic forces over time. It is composed mostly of basalt and palagonitic tuff, resulting in characteristic vertically fractured rock formations resembling columns. The islet contains a few underwater caves.

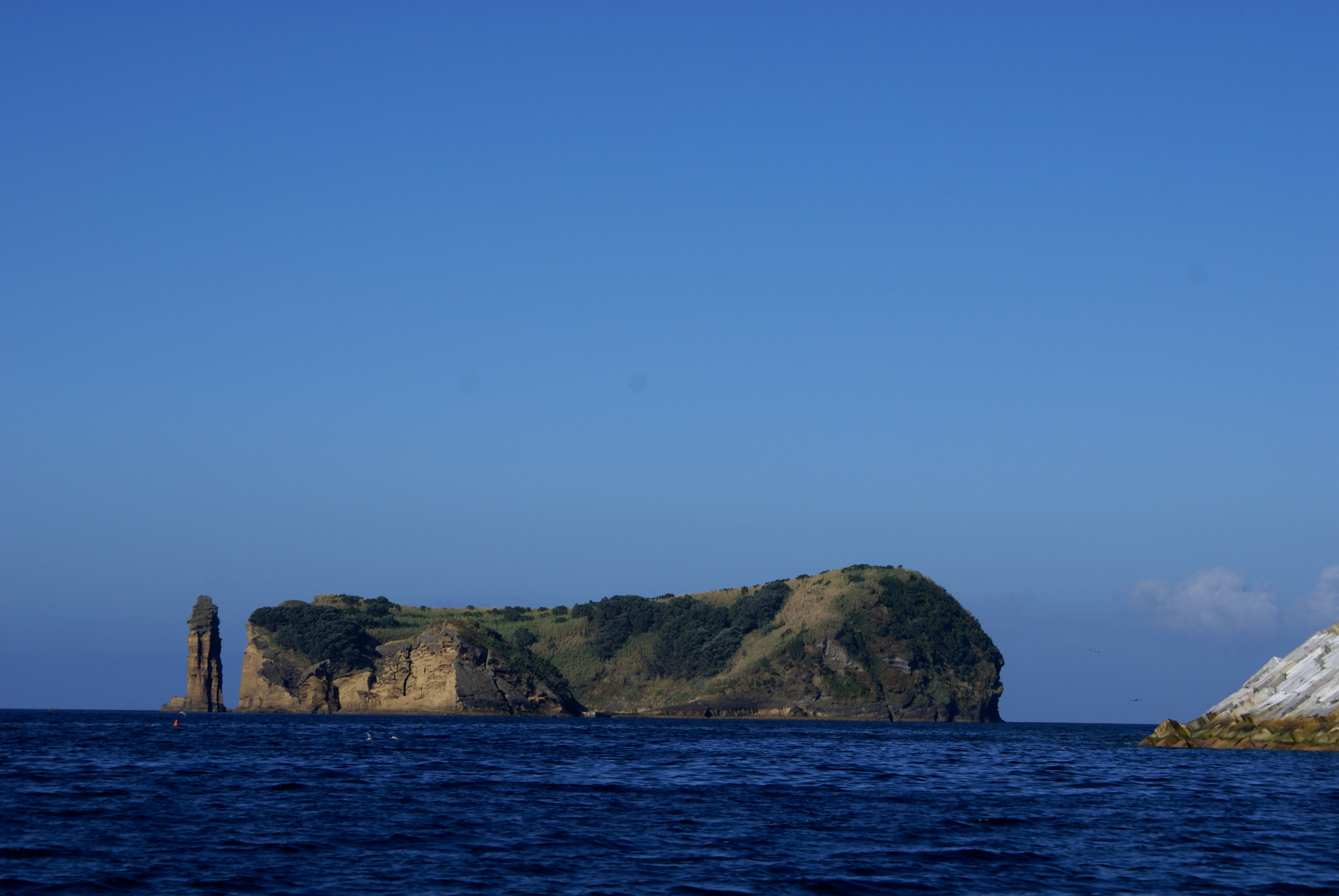
The islet seen from São Miguel, with Farilhão on the left

The islet is located between 500 metres (1,600 ft) and 1 kilometre (0.62 mi) off the south-central coast of the island of São Miguel, adjacent the municipality, town, and port of Vila Franca do Campo. The semicircular islet measures approximately 5 hectares (12 acres) or 6 hectares (15 acres) in area. The islet's highest point is approximately 62 metres (203 ft) above sea level. One of the islet's most notable geological formations is the 32.5-metre (107 ft) volcanic stack called Farilhão, which is located off the islet's southern end.

The volcanic cone's crater is open to the sea and filled with water. Known locally as Boquete, this circular crater measures about 150 metres (490 ft) in diameter, with a maximum water depth of approximately 20 metres (66 ft). As the opening in the crater faces north toward São Miguel, it creates a small natural harbor and sandy beach protected from wave action. The harbor and beach are so popular for swimming that from June to October multiple daily ferries transport bathers between Vila Franca do Campo and the islet. Due to the islet's protected status, only 400 total visitors may land there per day.

=== Biome ===
Vila Franca Islet functions as a breeding ground for various marine bird species including Bulwer's petrel, Cory's shearwater, little egret, and sooty tern. Marine birds visiting the islet include band-rumped storm petrel, common tern, Fea's petrel, little shearwater, and roseate tern. In recognition of the islet's role as a marine bird habitat, in 1983 the regional Legislative Assembly of the Azores decreed the islet and surrounding waters up to 30 metres (98 ft) deep a nature reserve. In 2004 the Legislative Assembly increased the area of protected waters to 350 metres (1,150 ft) all around the islet's coastline and further restricted human activities on the islet, including camping and fishing. Since 2002 the conservation organization BirdLife International has recognized the islet as an Important Bird Area. Despite governmental protection, human visitors occasionally destroy nest sites.

Endemic Azorean flowering plants growing on the islet include Azorean carrot (Daucus carota azoricus), Azorean firetree (Myrica faya), Azorean forget-me-not (Myosotis azorica), Azorean heather (Erica azorica), Azorean spurge or erva-leiteira (Euphorbia azorica), bracel-da-rocha fescue grass (Festuca petraea), Lotus azoricus, Pericallis malvifolia, and vidália (Azorina vidalii). A single exemplar of the naturalized dragon tree species Dracaena draco stands watch over the island. The native plants' continued health and presence are threatened by several invasive plant species, including the cane grass Arundo donax, elmleaf blackberry, French tamarisk, the myrtle tree Metrosideros excelsa, and the tree Pittosporum undulatum.

The central lagoon is well-suited for snorkeling and scuba diving. Fish and other aquatic animals present in the area include greater amberjack, groupers, moray eels, nudibranchs, parrotfish, sea urchins, starfish, and stingrays.

Though the islet only supports a thin layer of soil, historically the islet's highest portions were used for viticulture. Abandoned vineyards remain noticeable.

== History ==
Vila Franca Islet was discovered no later than 1537—the year written documents first attest to its existence—as early settlers of São Miguel moved west from their original settlements. In the past the islet accommodated various human activities and uses, including a military fort, a port, vineyards, and a whale watch. Historically the eastern part of the islet was used for butchering dolphins, and is therefore known locally as the Baixa da Cozinha ("kitchen reef").

Until 1982 one family privately owned the islet. This family holidayed and maintained vineyards on the islet, producing wine for local consumption. Apparently they were responsible for bringing invasive species to the islet, including Arundo donax which they used as hedges.

== Cliff diving ==
Vila Franca Islet is a regular stop on the Red Bull Cliff Diving World Series circuit. Events for the world series have taken place at Vila Franca Islet nine times: in 2010 and once every year from 2012 to 2019. A tenth event was scheduled for 6 September 2020, but was cancelled due to the COVID-19 pandemic.
