= Lighthouse of Ponta Garça =

Lighthouse

Ponta Garca Lighthouse Farol da Ponta Garça
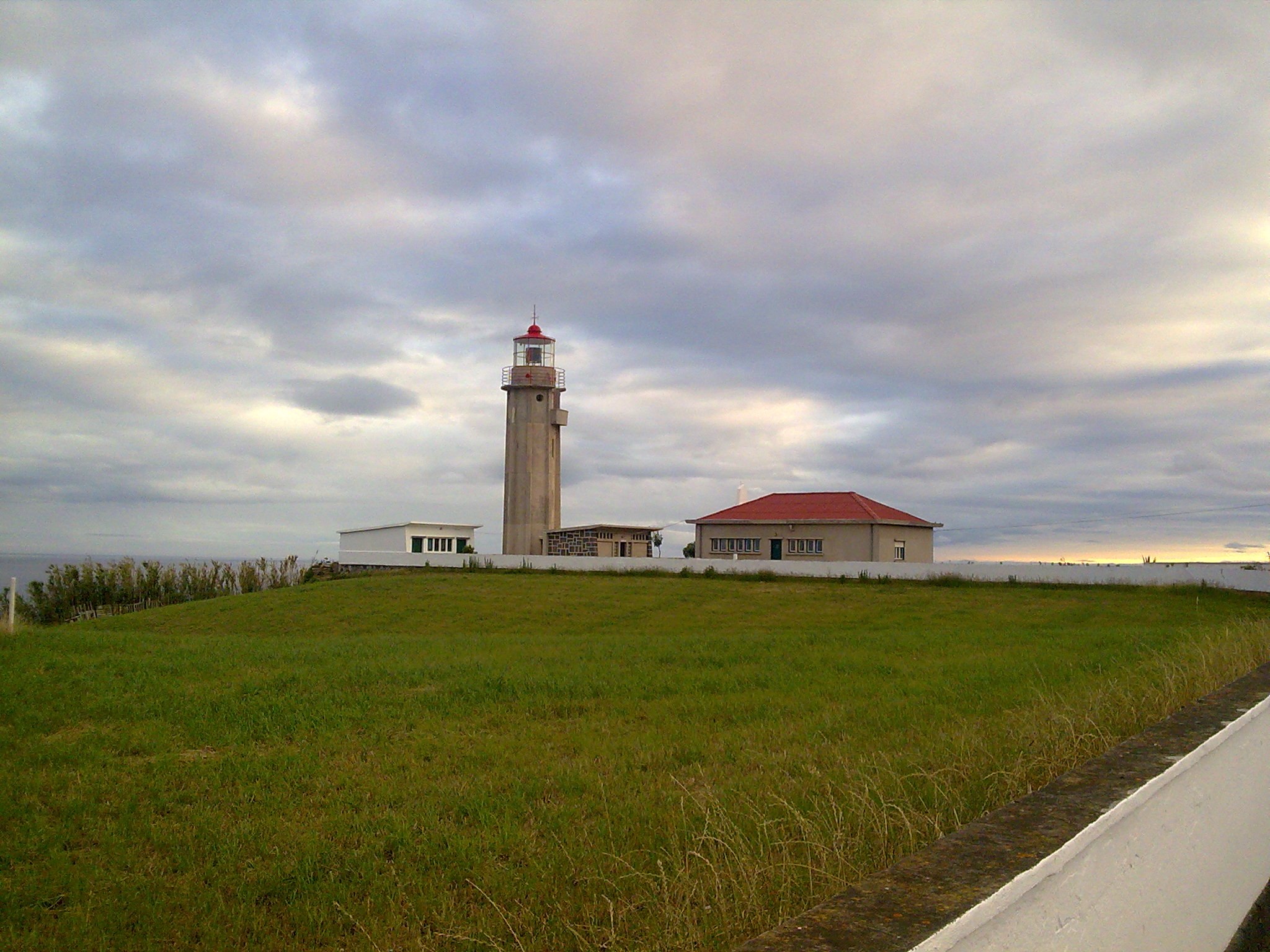
- A view of the lighthouse on the promontory of Ponta da Garça, in the area of Cinzeiro
- Location: Vila Franca do Campo, São Miguel, Portugal
- Coordinates: 37°42′51.74″N 25°22′12.35″W

Tower
- Constructed: 1956
- Construction: concrete
- Height: 14 m (46 ft)
- Operator: Marinha de Portugal
- Heritage: heritage without legal protection

Light
- Focal height: 101 m (331 ft)
- Range: 13–16 nautical miles (24–30 km; 15–18 mi)
- Characteristic: Fl G 4s

The Lighthouse of Ponta Garça (Portuguese: Farol da Ponta Garça) is a beacon/lighthouse located along cliffs of the civil parish of Ponta Garça in the municipality of Vila Franca do Campo, in the Portuguese archipelago of the Azores. The lighthouse was built in the 20th century, and consists of a circular tower and rectangular communications block, comparable to other lighthouses in the archipelago, namely Ponte do Cintrão and Ponta do Rosais.

== History ==
The lighthouse was constructed between 1956 and 1957, by the Comissão Administrativa das Novas Instalações para a Marinha (Naval Administrative Commission for New Installations), in an area of Ponta Garça called Cinzeiro.

In 1979, two sections of red lamp were installed to differentiate the areas protecting the zones of the islet of Vila Franca do Campo and the lower Lobeira.

Initially the beacon's illumination was accomplished with an acetylene lamp. But, in September 1980, the lighthouse was connected to the public electrical network, thus making the acetylene lamp redundant. During this installation, a new 100 W/220 V lamp was installed in the beacon. Seven years later, this lamp was replaced with a new 50 W/12 V lamp produced by a national manufacturer.

== Architecture ==
The lighthouse is located along the southern coast of the island of São Miguel, in the area referred to as Cinzeiro, about 101 metres (331 ft) above sea level. The complex is encircled by a white plastered wall, with alameda forming a "L", with gardens and a vegetable garden (near the lighthouse keepers' residence).

The various buildings are interconnected by pavement stone and surrounded by pasture. Over the wall protecting the lighthouse is a granite plaque, with the inscription: MINISTÉRIO DA DEFESA NACIONAL MARINHA AUTORIDADE MARÍTIMA NACIONAL DIRECÇÃO DE FARÓIS - CAPITANIA DO PORTO PONTA DELGADA FAROL PONTA DA GARÇA 1957 (Ministry of the Naval National Defense, National Maritime Directorate of Lighthouses - Captaincy of the Port of Ponta Delgada, Lighthouse of Ponta da Garça 1957).

The lighthouse consists of a tower, lighthouse keepers' residence and several annexes. The 14 metres (46 ft) cylindrical tower is plastered and painted, identifiable by eight 14 metres (46 ft) high false radial buttresses that narrow closer to the circular balcony of overlapping rings, painted red. At the top of the lighthouse is a glass cupola, covered in metal and painted red and surmounted by weathervane.

The tower includes four registers, the first marked by a rectangular doorway and frame, the two intermediaries by friezes and the last by a window, from which a staircase accesses the cupola. The top register window is flanked by two circular oculi. Access to the lighthouse is made from the single-story rectangular auxiliary building, which is slightly inclined towards the front. The front facade is plastered and painted, with the corners of exposed rock, with rectangular door flanked by two windows, framed and surmounted by two groups of five rectangles.

The lighthouse keepers' residence, also rectangular, is a simple building covered in tile. The facades are decorated with cornerstones, and encircled by brickwork, painted white and terminated in cornices. The principal facade, oriented towards the east, is marked by a rectangular door flanked by two groups of low windows, interconnected by sill and top frame, consisting of six on the left and four on the right. The lateral facades are dotted by central windows and sills above and below the frames, while a covered awning consisting of reinforced cement pillars.

== Sources ==
- Furtado, Eduardo Carvalho Vieira (2005), Guardiães do Mar dos Açores: uma viagem pelas ilhas do Atlântico (in Portuguese), Lisbon, Portugal
- Relatório da Actividade do Ministério no ano de 1956 (in Portuguese), Lisbon, Portugal: Ministério das Obras Públicas, 1957
