= Cais da Silveira =

Pier in the Terceira Island, Azores, Portugal

Wharf of Silveira Cais da Silveira
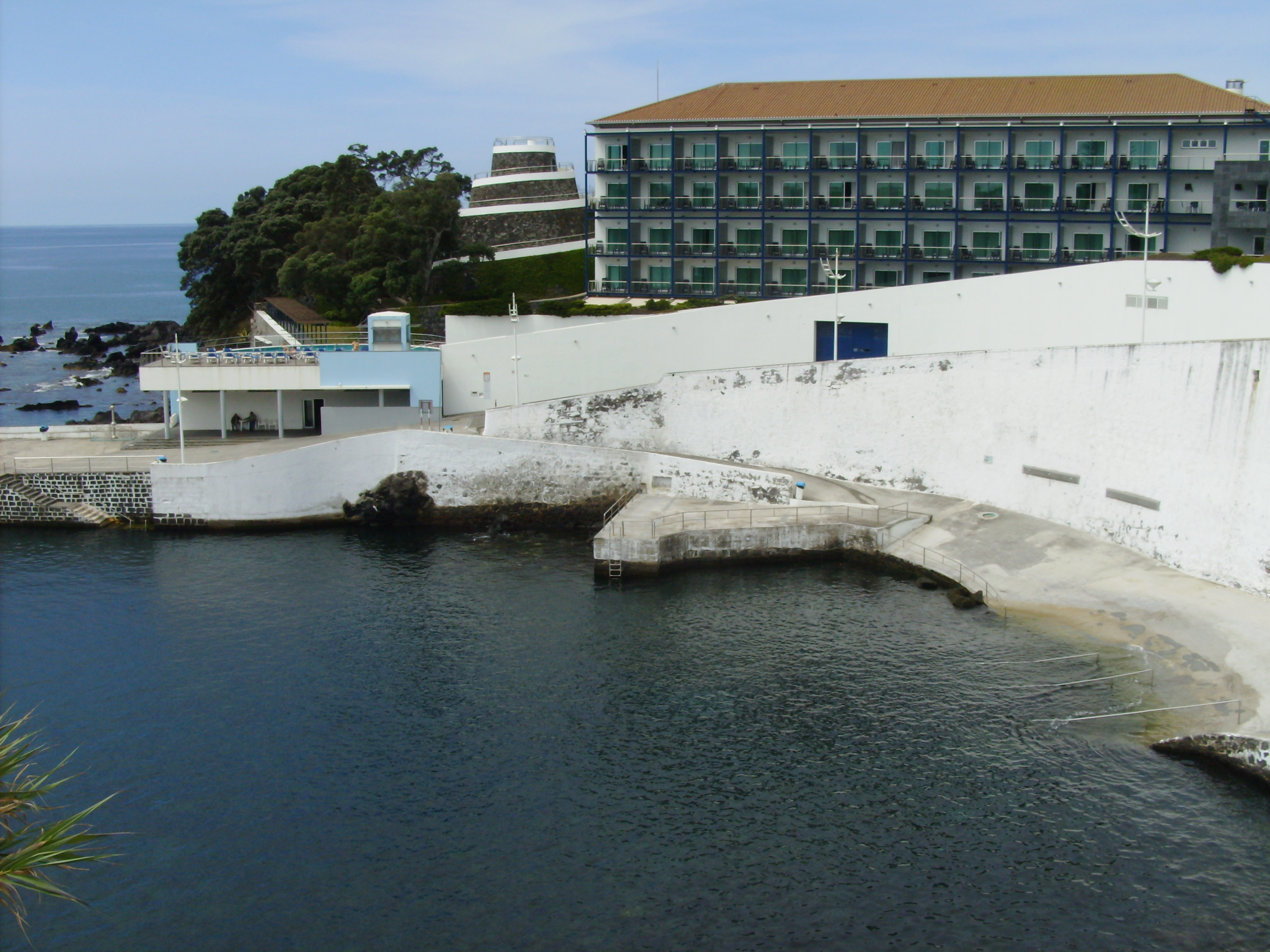
- A view of Cais da Silveira, with the tower and Hotel Caracol

Location
- Location: São Pedro, Angra do Heroísmo (Azores), Portugal
- Coordinates: 38.655938°N 27.235777°W

Details
- Owner: Câmara Municipal de Angra do Heroísmo
- Opened: 15th century

The Wharf of Silveira (Portuguese: Cais da Silveira) is situated in the Bay of Fanal, in the civil parish of São Pedro, in the municipality of Angra do Heroísmo, along the southern coast of Terceira, in the Portuguese archipelago of the Azores.

The region constituted part of a historical fishing anchorage, owing to the high cliffs and protection in the shadow of Monte Brasil; the cliffs of basalt formed from successive pyroclastic lava flows that resulted in the formation of the tuff cone.

At one end of the wharf is the Caracol, literally, the "snail", since the winding tower resembles the shell of a gastropod. The structure functions as a scenic overlook and observation tower, and was typical of the type of structure used to watch vessels approaching the coast, during the export period of the islands. This was the case with the fabled "orange cycle", when ships arrived at Angra to load-up on citrus fruits for Europe. From the Caracol, today part of the Hotel Caracol, there are views of the Bay of Fanal and Monte Brasil, in addition to the Wharf of Figueirinha and walls of the Fortress of São João Baptista.

It constitutes one of the main bathing areas of the city. The wharf is part of the lines that intersect the historic centre of Angra, and is included in the regional decree constituting the area.
