= Vila Franca do Campo =

- Municipality
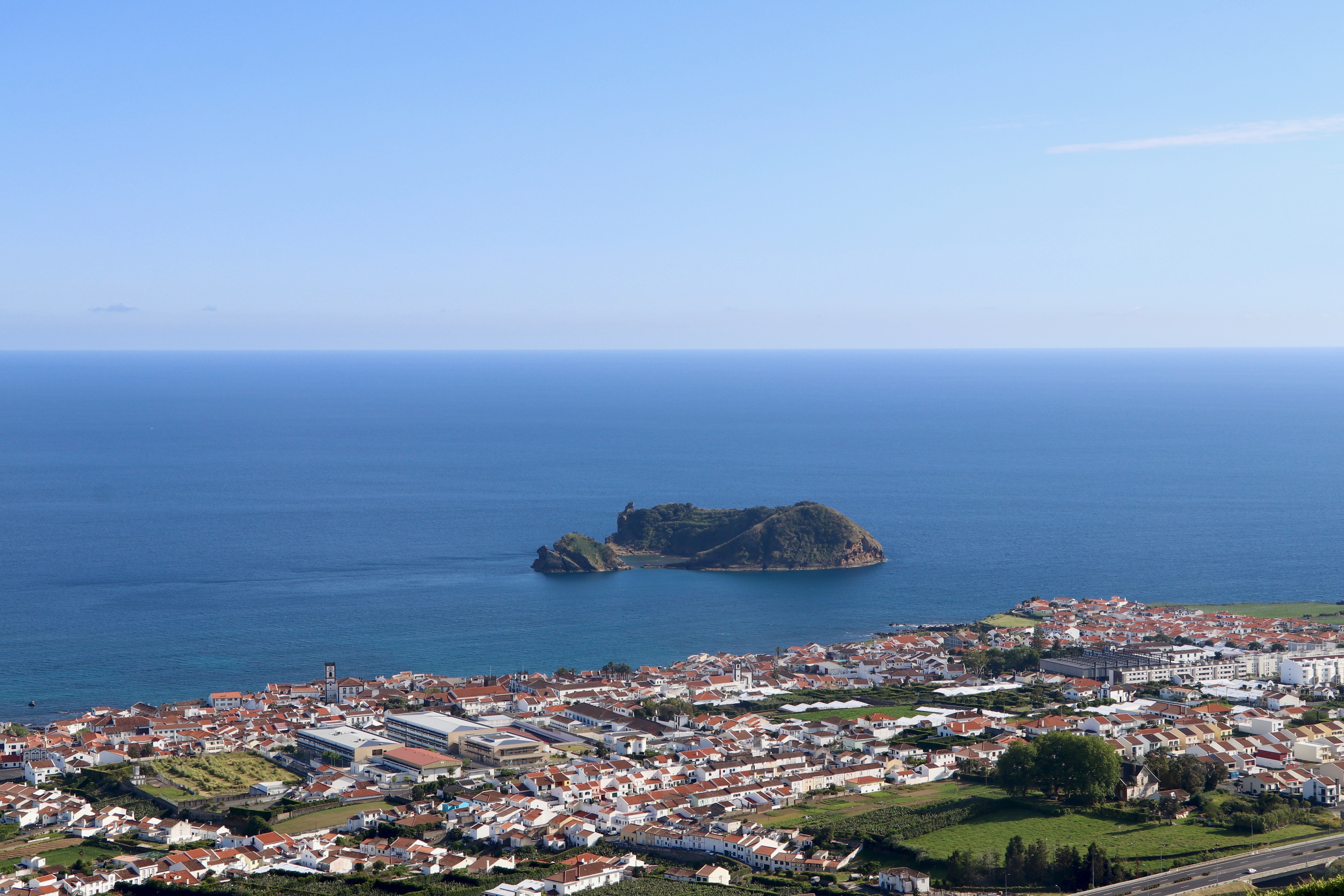
- The town of Vila Franca do Campo, with its emblematic volcanic islet, the Ilhéu de Vila Franca

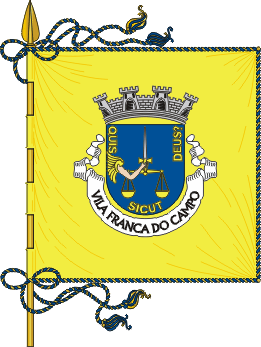
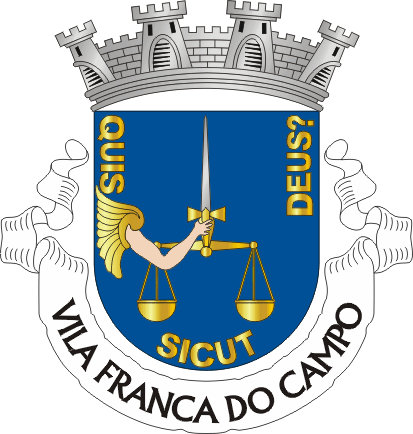
- Flag Coat of arms
- Interactive map of Vila Franca do Campo
- Coordinates: 37°43′00″N 25°26′0″W
- Country: Portugal
- Auton. region: Azores
- Island: São Miguel
- Established: Settlement: 15th Century; Municipality: 1472
- Parishes: 6

Government
  - President: Ricardo Manuel de Amaral Rodrigues

Area
  - Total: 77.97 km^{2} (30.10 sq mi)

Population (2021)
  - Total: 10 323
  - Density: 0.13/km^{2} (0.33/sq mi)
- Time zone: UTC−01:00 (AZOT)
  - Summer (DST): UTC+00:00 (AZOST)
- Postal code: 9680-115
- Area code: 296
- Patron: São João
- Local holiday: 24 June
- Website: http://www.cmvfc.pt

Vila Franca do Campo (Portuguese pronunciation: [ˈvilɐ ˈfɾɐ̃kɐ ðu ˈkɐ̃pu]) is a Portuguese town on the island of São Miguel in the Autonomous Region of the Azores. It covers an area of 78.00 km^{2} and has a population of 10,323 inhabitants (2021). The municipality is divided into six parishes and is bordered to the north by the municipality of Ribeira Grande, to the east by Povoação, to the west by Lagoa, and to the south it has a coastline along the Atlantic Ocean.

The Vila Franca Islet, an uninhabited coastal tuff cone, lies 1,200 metres (3,900 ft) from Vila Franca do Campo. Since 1993, the Ilhéu de Vila Franca has been a natural reserve and remains an important summer destination.

== History ==
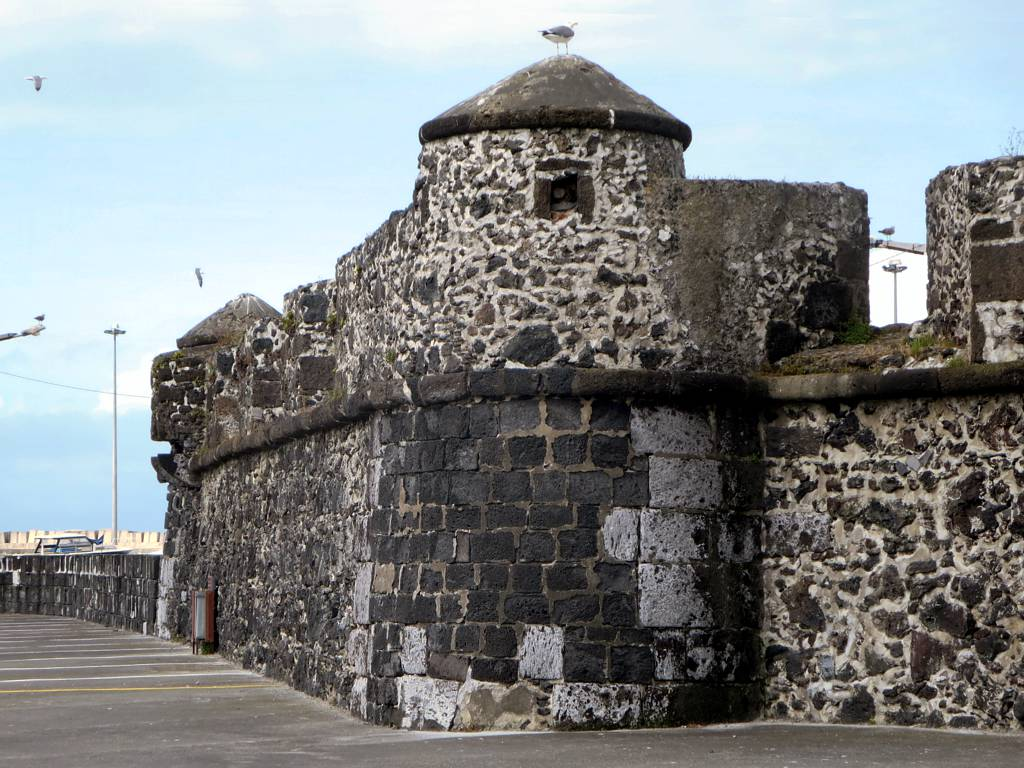
Fort of Tagarete, known at least since the beginning of the 18th century

Vila Franca do Campo displays its municipal motto, Quis sicut deus?, on its flag and on its coat-of-arms. This Latin phrase means "Who is like God?" It is a reference to St. Michael the Archangel for whom the island of São Miguel is named; in Hebrew, the name, Michael, means "he who is like God".

Founded in the middle of the 15th century by Gonçalo Vaz Botelho, the settlement was elevated to the status of vila (town) in 1472; Vila Franca do Campo quickly grew into the largest settlement and administrative seat of the island of São Miguel.

The greatest tragedy to befall the Azores occurred on 20 October 1522, when a violent earthquake hit the area of Vila Franca do Campo, then the capital of the archipelago and most important Azorean settlement. During the earthquake and subsequent landslide, 5000 people were killed, with then Captain-Donatário Rui Gonçalves da Câmara II escaping the tragedy: he was relaxing in his summer home in Lagoa at the time of the tragedy. Many of the residents were buried alive from a landslide and debris. Because of its destruction, the capital of São Miguel was transferred to Ponta Delgada, where the Captain-Donatário installed his administration in a residence near the Church of São Pedro. King John III eventually elevated Ponta Delgada to the status of city on 2 April 1546, attracting more and more economic activity and settlement.

In the sequel of the 1582 naval battle off the coast of São Miguel, the Spanish victors had several hundred French and Portuguese prisoners executed in the town.

The town began to prosper again from the 18th century onwards from orange plantations, and later, from pineapple production.

In July 1562, Bento de Góis was born in this town. He undertook, between 1602 and 1606, the greatest Portuguese overland expedition to Central Asia and one of the largest in human history.

The first Micaelense nun, Petronilha da Mota, daughter of Jorge da Mota, is buried here. She became known as Mother Maria de Jesus, the first abbess of the Convent of Santo André.

During the Colonisation of the Azores, São Miguel Island became known for "the great yields" of wheat and woad cultivation, introduced by Flemish immigrants, thanks to the rich and fertile soil.

The cultivation of woad, pastel in portuguese Isatis tinctoria was introduced by Lodewijk Govaert, a migrant from Bruges to the Island of Faial, but he "lived in Vila Franca do Campo," where he became known as Luis Govarte, Gouaert, or, eventually, Luis Goulart.

There was a general consensus regarding the successful exploitation of woad, wheat, and sugar, introduced by the Flemish immigrants, which formed the backbone of the Azorean economy during the 16th and 17th centuries, providing significant profits to the Portuguese Crown.

Vila Franca do Campo, was once known as the ‘Coimbra Micaelense,’ (a reference to the great portuguese academic city of Coimbra), due to the existence of a centre of studies, more specifically at the Convent of São Francisco, where various students from all over São Miguel Island, and even from the neighbouring island of Santa Maria, would come to study grammar, Latin, and theology.

It became the first municipality on São Miguel Island to have access to electricity. The inauguration took place on 18 March 1900, at 7:00 PM local time, when 162 light bulbs were lit, as well as three large voltaic chandeliers, which were installed in the town centre, at the Bento de Góis square, and finally at the forecourt of the Church of São Miguel Arcanjo.

On 4 October 1904, a Royal Decree was published, signed by Queen Dona Amélia of Orléans, at the request of Doctor Urbano de Mendonça Dias along with César Rodrigues and Cortes Rodrigues, which led to the creation of the Instituto Vilafranquense, also known as "O Colégio" (The College). For a long time, it was the oldest school in the Azores, where students could obtain their preparatory and secondary education.

The school was donated by Doctor Urbano de Mendonça Dias's family to the Fabriqueira Committee of the Church of São Miguel Arcanjo. The Chapel of the Nativity can still be found there, and today catechism classes are held in one of the buildings that once housed "The College", next to the chapel.

== Geography ==
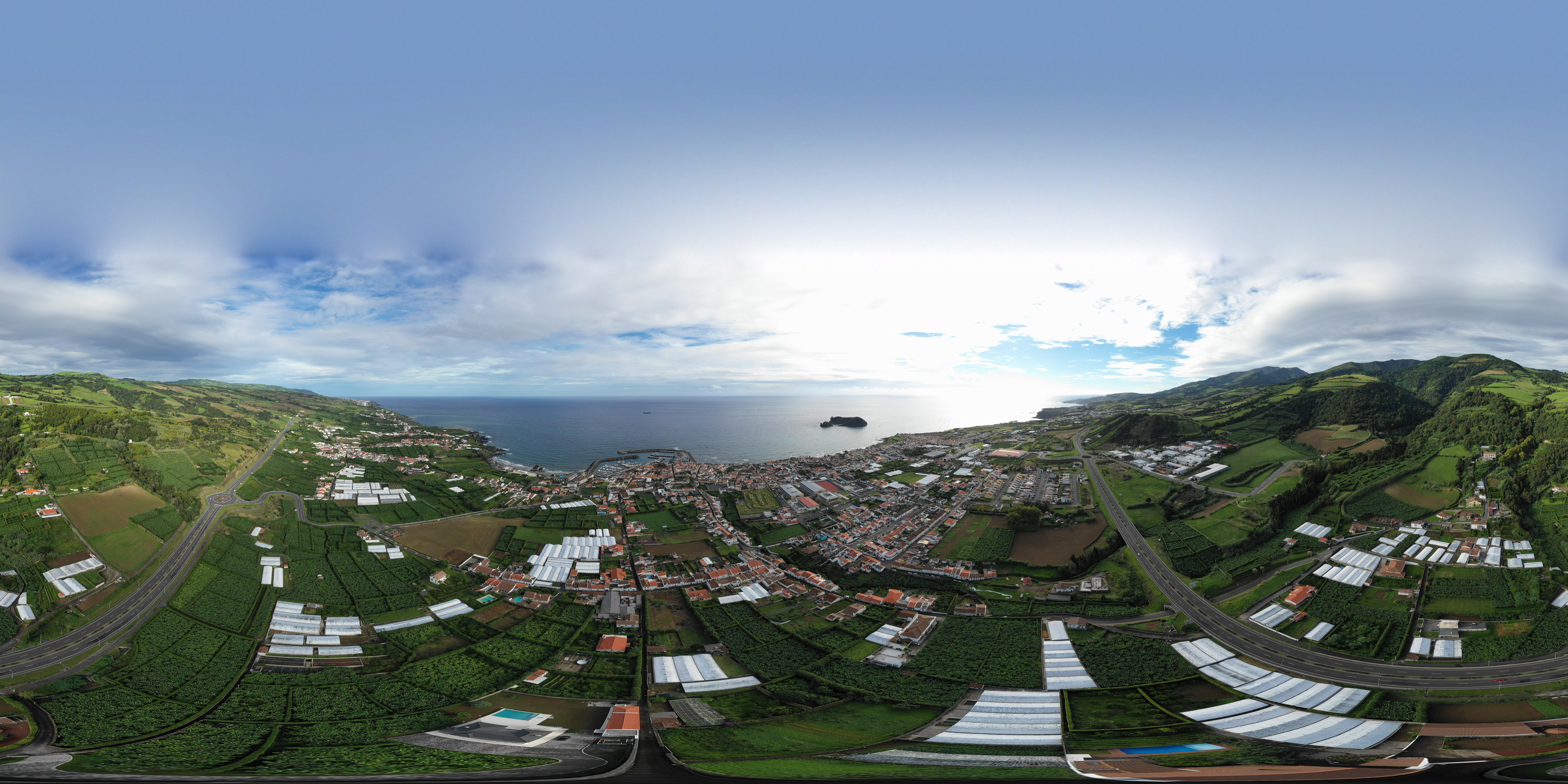
Vila Franca do Campo – 360° Panorama (view as a 360° interactive panorama)

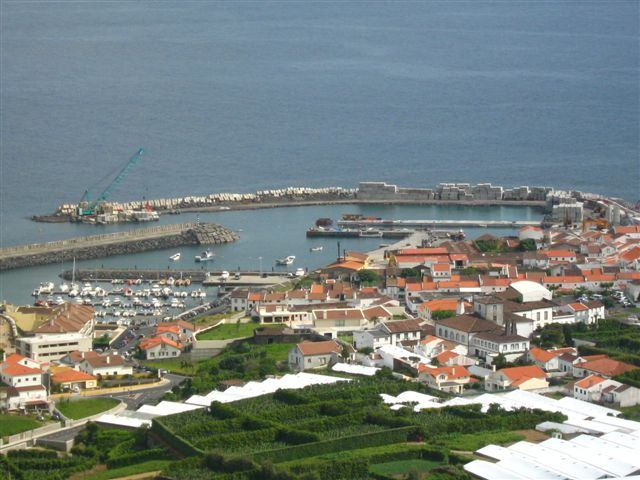
The main port and marina in São Miguel

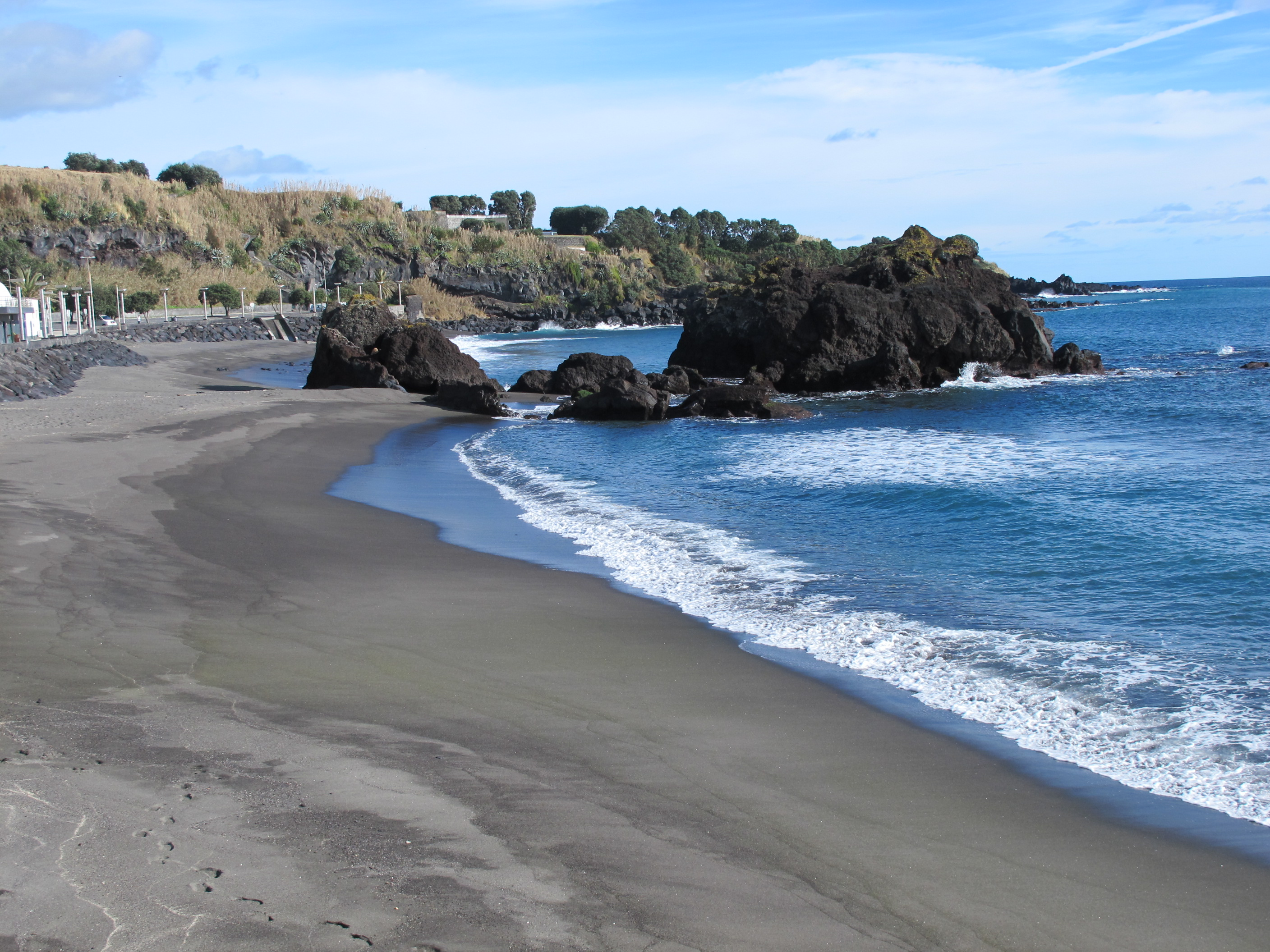
The Beach of Vinha da Areia, one of the summer destinations of sunseekers

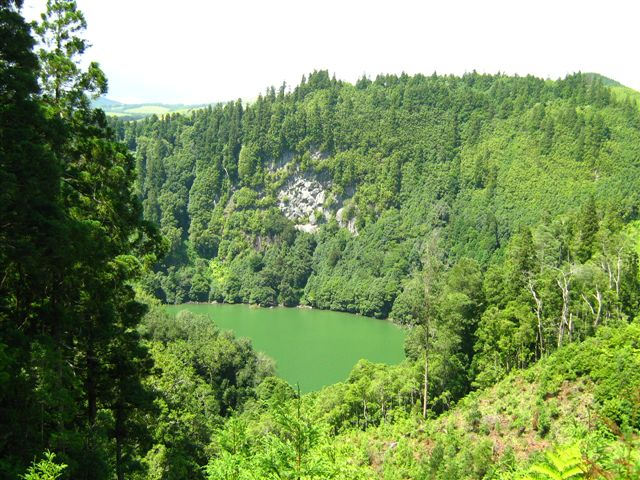
A view of the Lagoa da Congro, a volcanic lake that marks the interior of the municipality

Vila Franca do Campo Municipality is located east of Ponta Delgada via the Regional E.R.1-1ª roadway, while it is linked by mountain roads to the eastern and northern communities (including Lagoa, Furnas and Povoação). Most of the mountainous areas of the municipality are forested, and interspersed with pasturelands and fields dedicated to agriculture and grazing.

The climate in this region is mild and humid, with temperatures oscillating between 14 °C (57 °F) and 22 °C (72 °F), and with regular precipitation, responsible for the fertile soils and ravines. These ravines that cross the municipality include the Ribeira da s Três Voltas, Ribeira da Praia and Ribeira da Mãe d'Água.

The relief of this region is characterized by basaltic rock and projectiles from volcanic activities on the island, forming many of the distinctive geomorphological structures, such as: the islet of Vila Franca, Pico d'El-Rei (674 m), Monte Escuro (890 m), Lombados Pisões (258 m), Miradouro (685 m), Lagoa do Fogo and Ponta da Pirâmide.

Administratively, the six parishes of Vila Franca do Campo Municipality include:

- Água de Alto, the 1 656 resident population (2021 Census), located on the western border of the municipality is known for the beaches and coves that hug the coast; initially a settlement of thirty homes in the 15th century, it was a locality within the civil parish of São Pedro until 1908, when it was deannexed from the local administrative authority and incorporated;
- Ponta Garça, the largest parish within Vila Franca, and longest by extension in the Azores, Ponta Garça includes a population of 3 157 inhabitants located along a lateral roadway that hugs the clifftops of the south-central region to the small fajãs/beaches of Povoação;
- Ribeira das Tainhas, with 640 inhabitants, the smallest parish in the area, it was historically an agricultural centre involved in the cultivation and exportation of oranges and wine, through the natural Porto do Calhau da Areia;
- Ribeira Seca, with 1 005 residents, it is known as the land of mills and cultivable land;
- São Miguel, with a population of 2 487 inhabitants (2021), its population density is 136.6 inhabitants per km². It is the most important parish in the municipality, housing most of the services, shops, and the municipal seat (town hall);
- São Pedro, The parish of São Pedro has a primary school, a small parish church, a Franciscan convent, the largest shop in the municipality, one of the best sports halls in Portugal, a fire station, a police station, beaches, potteries, and a garden.

== Architecture ==
=== Civic ===
- Lighthouse of Ponta Garça (Portuguese: Farol de Ponta Garça), the 20th century lighthouse includes a single circular tower and main block, similar to other modernist structures of this type, such as the lighthouses of Ponte do Cintrão (Ribeira Grande) and Ponta dos Rosais (Rosais)

=== Religious ===
- Church of Bom Jesus da Pedra (Portuguese: Igreja e hospital da Misericórdia de Vila Franca do Campo/Igreja do Espírito Santo/Igreja do Bom Jesus da Pedra), the hospital was instituted in 1483, after Isabel Gonçalves (widow of Afonso Gonçalves), donated the home in which she lived (after her heirs refused the home and were disinherited). After 1552 the building was already referred to as a possession of the Santa Casa da Misericórdia, where a chapel/church was part of the building. Over the intervening years the church evolved into a complex three nave structure, decorated in the Manueline style with ornate frontispiece and doorways.
- Church of Bom Jesus Menino (Portuguese: Igreja Paroquial de Ribeira das Taínhas/Igreja do Bom Jesus Menino), the simple church, includes a plain facade with an oculus over the doorway;
- Church of São João Baptista (Portuguese: Ermida de São João Baptista/Igreja de São João Baptista)
- Church of São Lazaro (Portuguese: Igreja Paroquial de Água de Alto/Igreja de São Lázaro), the three-story 18th-century church is secluded in the upper roads of Água de Alto, first referenced in the testament of João Afonso, of Grotas Fundas in 1511;
- Church of São Miguel Arcanjo (Portuguese: Igreja Matriz de Vila Franca do Campo/Igreja de São Miguel Arcanjo), often confused as the Church of Senhor da Pedra, the 15th century church is one of the oldest in the Azores, with unpainted brick facade and orante interior that includes 16th century organ, gilded and azulejo-decorated chancel;
- Church of Nossa Senhora da Piedade (Portuguese: Igreja Paroquial de Ponta Garça/Igreja de Nossa Senhora da Piedade), the 3-story simple Manuelinesque church developed from the construction of a small temple in 1530, through the initiative of Lopo Anes de Araújo, son in law of Rui Vaz, in a letter dated 15 January 1696;
- Convent of São Francisco (Portuguese: Convento de São Francisco), the convent of Saint Francis of Assisi was reconstructed following the 1522 earthquake to house religious sisters, but following several social convulsions, in the late 20th century it was readapted as local tourist lodging;
- Hermitage of Mãe de Deus (Portuguese: Ermida da Mãe de Deus), the small ornate hermitage was donated to the municipal council of Vila Franca in 1984 by Inácio de Melo and his family, and includes several Manueline-style flourishes in the portico and bell-tower;
- Hermitage of Nossa Senhora da Paz (Portuguese: Ermida de Nossa Senhora da Paz), the simple hermitage was elaborated into an important scenic attraction with the construction in 1967 of a staircase to represent Pais Nossos dos Mistérios Gozosos e Dolorosos (Our Father and Joyful/Sorrowful Mysteries) prayer, separated into ten flights to symbolize the Ave Maria prayer;
- Hermitage of Santa Catarina (Portuguese: Ermida de Santa Catarina), located on the coastal street connecting the lower town to the fishing port (and identifiable for the statue of Henry the Navigator located in its square), the 16th century Mannerist hermitage (today dedicated to the fisherman) was first identified by Nuno Gonçalves in 1504;
- Hermitage of Santo Amaro (Portuguese: Ermida de Santo Amaro), the historian/priest Gaspar Frutuoso referred to the existence of this hermitage in the area of Relva in Vila Franca, which became the seat of a religious brotherhood, located at the doorstep of Miguel da Grã's farm;
- Hermitage of São João Baptista (Portuguese: Ermida de São João Baptista/Igreja de São João Baptista), this hermitage is located on the town's outskirts on a hilltop in the direction of Furnas; a 16th-century chapel, it is simple with an interior niche displaying the image of John the Baptist which is popular displayed during annual festivals;

== Notable people ==
- Bento de Góis (1562 in Vila Franca do Campo – 1607) a Jesuit brother, missionary and explorer; the first known European to travel overland from India to China, via current day Afghanistan and the Pamir Mountains.
- Armando Fontes (born in 1958 in Vila Franca do Campo) a former footballer with 166 club caps
- Nelly Furtado, famous luso-canadian singer, her parents were born in the Parish of Ponta Garça.
