= Ribeira Seca (Vila Franca do Campo) =

- Civil parish
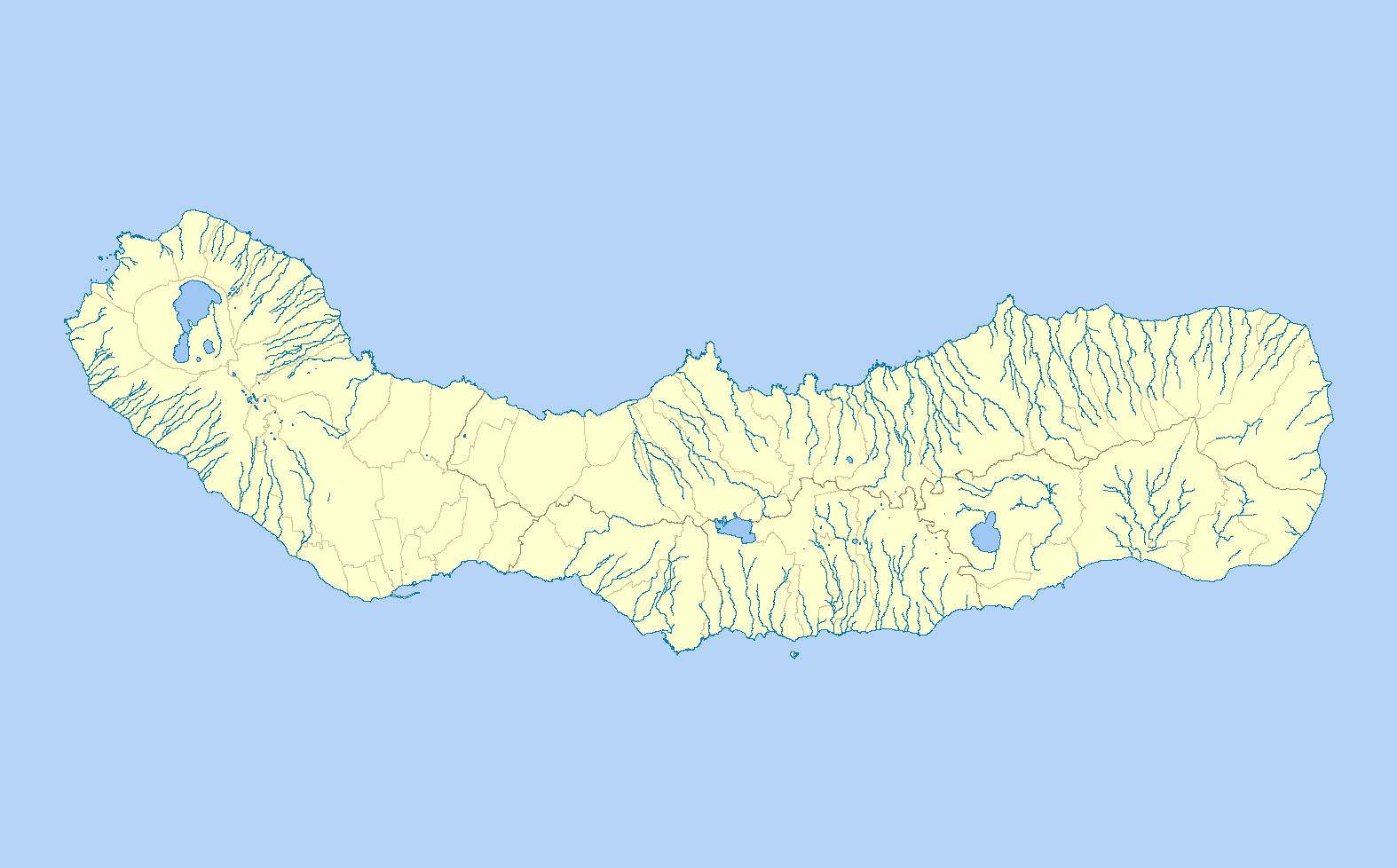
- Location in the Azores Ribeira Seca (São Miguel)
- Coordinates: 37°43′17″N 25°25′24″W
- Country: Portugal
- Auton. region: Azores
- Island: São Miguel
- Municipality: Vila Franca do Campo
- Established: Settlement: fl. 1500; Parish: fl. 1900; Civil parish: 13 June 2002

Area
  - Total: 5.53 km^{2} (2.14 sq mi)
- Elevation: 51 m (167 ft)

Population (2011)
  - Total: 1,106
  - Density: 200/km^{2} (520/sq mi)
- Time zone: UTC−01:00 (AZOT)
  - Summer (DST): UTC+00:00 (AZOST)
- Postal code: 9680-021
- Area code: 292
- Patron: São João Baptiste
- Website: jfribeiraseca.com

Ribeira Seca (Portuguese for "dry stream") is a civil parish in the municipality of Vila Franca do Campo on the island of São Miguel in the Portuguese archipelago of the Azores. The population in 2011 was 1,106, in an area of 5.53 km^{2}.

== History ==
In June 2002, the civil parish was divided from the neighbouring parish of São Miguel to form its own autonomous local authority.
