= Ponta Garça =

- Civil parish
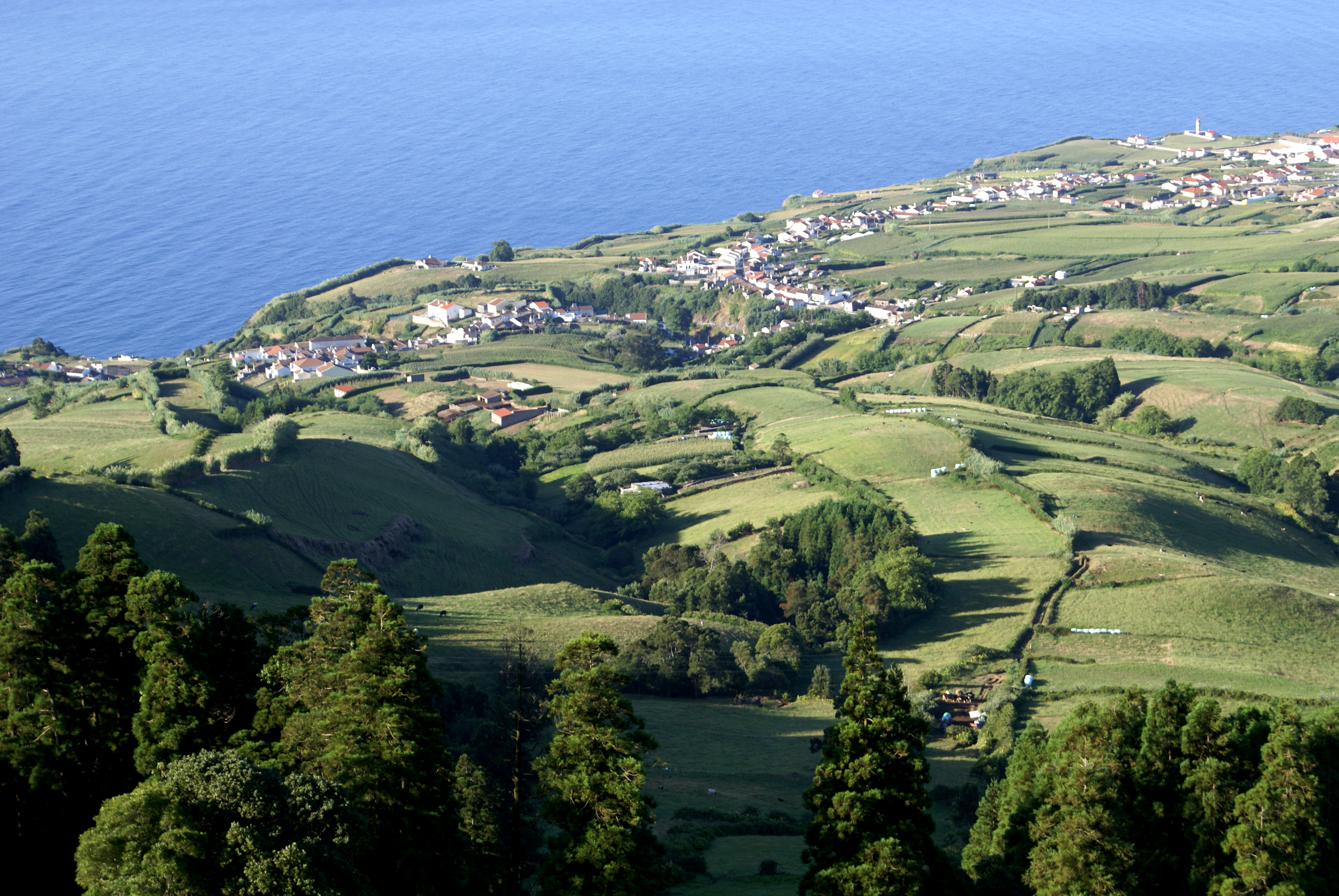
- Partial view of the parish of Ponta Garça, considered the longest parish on the island of São Miguel

- Location of the civil parish of Ponta Garça in the municipality of Vila Franca do Campo
- Coordinates: 37°43′7″N 25°22′12″W
- Country: Portugal
- Auton. region: Azores
- Island: São Miguel
- Municipality: Vila Franca do Campo
- Established: Settlement: fl. 1500

Area
  - Total: 29.35 km^{2} (11.33 sq mi)
- Elevation: 123 m (404 ft)

Population (2011)
  - Total: 3,547
  - Density: 120.9/km^{2} (313.0/sq mi)
- Time zone: UTC−01:00 (AZOT)
  - Summer (DST): UTC+00:00 (AZOST)
- Postal code: 9680-447
- Area code: 292
- Patron: Nossa Senhora da Piedade
- Website: jfpontagarca.ifreg.pt

Ponta Garça is a civil parish in the municipality of Vila Franca do Campo in the Portuguese archipelago of the Azores. The population in 2011 was 3,547, in an area of 29.35 km^{2}. It is the largest parish in Vila Franca do Campo.

== History ==
Gaspar Frutuoso indicated that the origin of its toponymy was connected with the first settlers' reflections on sighting this zone. On the other hand, the local civil parish council claims that the area was named for the preponderance of marine birds, that nest on the cliffs of the parish.

The civil parish was first designated in the 16th century, likely owing to the communities growth and access to potable water.

== Geography ==
The parish is located along the main regional roadway that links Lagoa and Ponta Delgada with the eastern part of the island. It is situated in the eastern part of Vila Franca do Campo. It contains the localities Cinzeiro, Meio Moio, Ponta Garça and Senhora das Mercês. Ponta Garça has 3 elementary schools, and a church.

=== Climate ===
Climate data for Cerrado dos Bezerros, 1973-1990, altitude: 440 m (1,440 ft)
Month	Jan	Feb	Mar	Apr	May	Jun	Jul	Aug	Sep	Oct	Nov	Dec	Year
Record high °C (°F)	18.2 (64.8)	18.0 (64.4)	21.0 (69.8)	20.0 (68.0)	23.0 (73.4)	23.2 (73.8)	26.5 (79.7)	26.5 (79.7)	25.5 (77.9)	24.0 (75.2)	21.0 (69.8)	18.5 (65.3)	26.5 (79.7)
Mean daily maximum °C (°F)	13.5 (56.3)	13.3 (55.9)	13.8 (56.8)	14.0 (57.2)	16.0 (60.8)	18.3 (64.9)	20.8 (69.4)	21.9 (71.4)	20.8 (69.4)	18.5 (65.3)	16.2 (61.2)	14.4 (57.9)	16.8 (62.2)
Daily mean °C (°F)	11.0 (51.8)	10.7 (51.3)	11.1 (52.0)	11.1 (52.0)	13.2 (55.8)	15.3 (59.5)	17.5 (63.5)	18.8 (65.8)	17.8 (64.0)	15.7 (60.3)	13.5 (56.3)	11.9 (53.4)	14.0 (57.1)
Mean daily minimum °C (°F)	8.5 (47.3)	8.0 (46.4)	8.5 (47.3)	8.3 (46.9)	10.4 (50.7)	12.4 (54.3)	14.4 (57.9)	15.4 (59.7)	14.7 (58.5)	12.8 (55.0)	10.9 (51.6)	9.4 (48.9)	11.1 (52.0)
Record low °C (°F)	0.6 (33.1)	0.3 (32.5)	0.3 (32.5)	0.5 (32.9)	5.0 (41.0)	7.0 (44.6)	9.0 (48.2)	10.5 (50.9)	8.5 (47.3)	7.5 (45.5)	5.5 (41.9)	2.0 (35.6)	0.3 (32.5)
Average rainfall mm (inches)	205.2 (8.08)	181.8 (7.16)	190.7 (7.51)	162.7 (6.41)	117.6 (4.63)	98.0 (3.86)	59.6 (2.35)	71.8 (2.83)	141.9 (5.59)	162.4 (6.39)	271.6 (10.69)	237.0 (9.33)	1,900.3 (74.83)
Average relative humidity (%)	90	89	88	86	88	87	85	86	88	88	90	90	88
Source: Instituto de Meteorologia

== Economy ==
The main industries are agriculture and manufacturing.

== Architecture ==
=== Civic ===
- Estate of the Viscount Botelho (Portuguese: Solar Visconde Botelho)
- Lighthouse of Ponta Garça (Portuguese: Farol de Ponta Garça), the 20th century lighthouse includes a single circular tower and main block, similar to other modernist structures of this type, such as the lighthouse of Ponta dos Rosais; considered emblematic of the region, it was constructed in 1957, and includes a 14 metres (46 ft) tower, with view of the sea and parish.

=== Religious ===
- Church of Nossa Senhora da Piedade (Portuguese: Igreja Paroquial de Ponta Garça/Igreja de Nossa Senhora da Piedade)
- Hermitage of Senhora das Mercês (Portuguese: Ermida da Senhora das Mercês), situated in Grotas Fundas, this hermitage dates from the 18th century, and includes an image in high-relief dating from the same period.
