= São Miguel (Vila Franca do Campo) =

- Civil parish
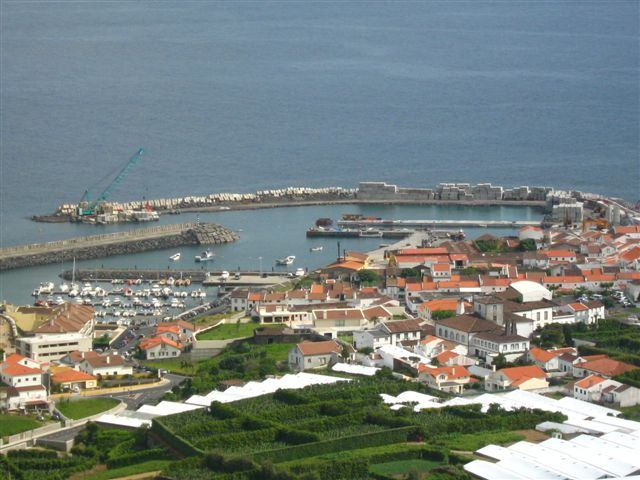
- The central marina and port, as well as the concentrated urban zone of São Miguel that makeup the core of the town of Vila Franca do Campo

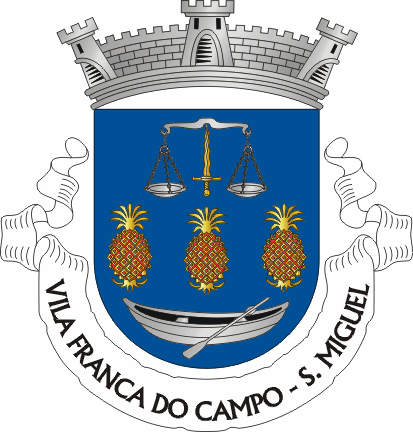
- Coat of arms

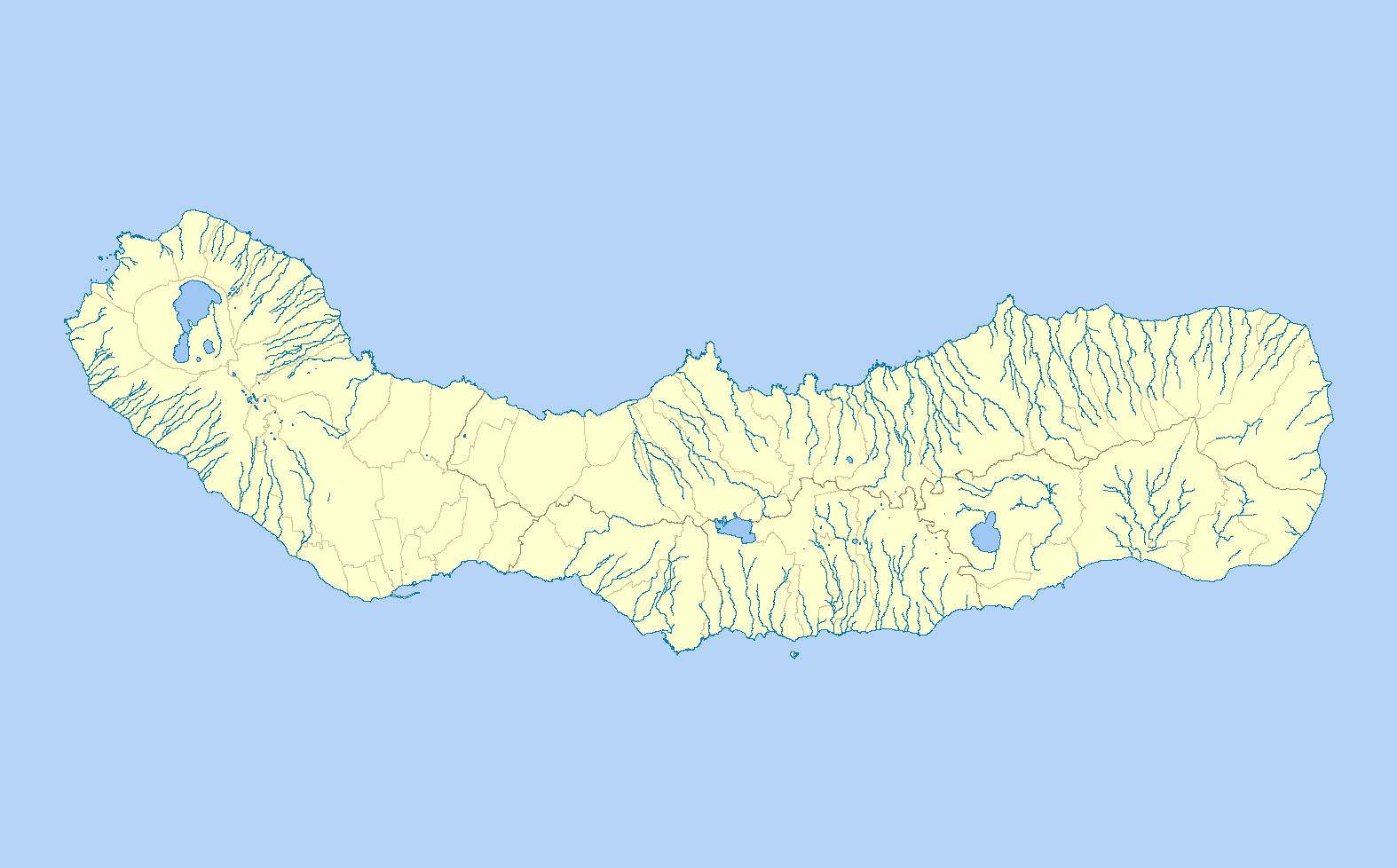
- Location in the Azores São Miguel (São Miguel)
- Coordinates: 37°43′3″N 25°26′3″W
- Country: Portugal
- Auton. region: Azores
- Island: São Miguel
- Municipality: Vila Franca do Campo
- Established: Settlement: fl. 1500

Area
  - Total: 12.60 km^{2} (4.86 sq mi)
- Elevation: 30 m (98 ft)

Population (2011)
  - Total: 2,659
  - Density: 211.0/km^{2} (546.6/sq mi)
- Time zone: UTC−01:00 (AZOT)
  - Summer (DST): UTC+00:00 (AZOST)
- Postal code: 9680-174
- Area code: 292
- Patron: São Miguel Arcanjo
- Website: www.jfsaomiguel.pt

São Miguel (Portuguese for Saint Michael) is a parish in the municipality of Vila Franca do Campo in the Azores. The population in 2011 was 2,659, in an area of 12.60 km².

== History ==
In July 2002, the settlement of Ribeira Seca split from São Miguel and became an independent parish.
