= São Pedro (Vila Franca do Campo) =

- Civil parish
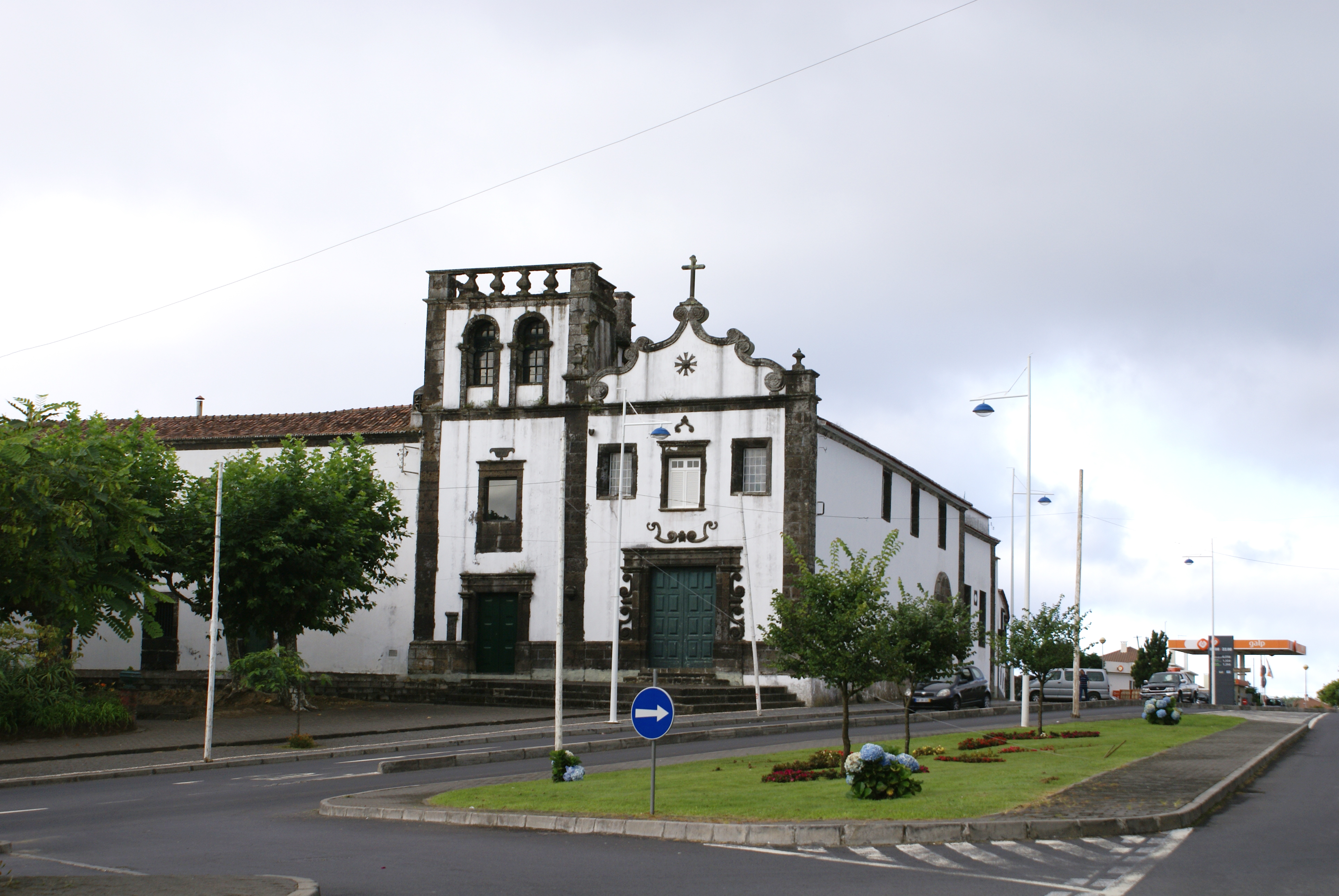
- The historical convent of Saint Francis of Assisi, centrally located within the urbanized area of São Pedro

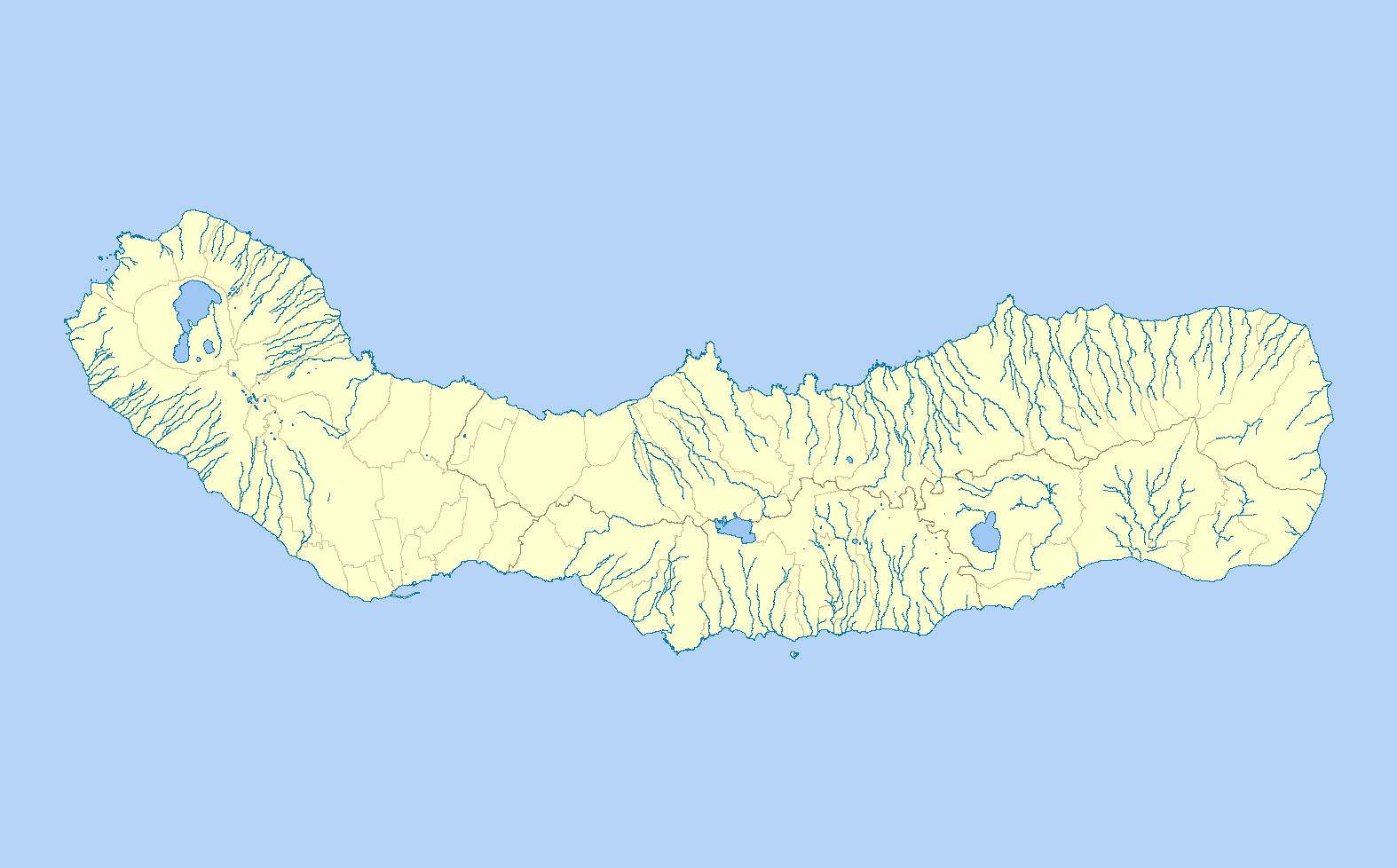
- Location in the Azores São Pedro (São Miguel)
- Coordinates: 37°42′57″N 25°26′38″W
- Country: Portugal
- Auton. region: Azores
- Island: São Miguel
- Municipality: Vila Franca do Campo

Area
  - Total: 2.48 km^{2} (0.96 sq mi)
- Elevation: 35 m (115 ft)

Population (2011)
  - Total: 1,426
  - Density: 575/km^{2} (1,490/sq mi)
- Time zone: UTC−01:00 (AZOT)
  - Summer (DST): UTC+00:00 (AZOST)
- Postal code: 9680-127
- Area code: 292
- Patron: São Pedro
- Website: www.jfsaopedro.net

São Pedro (Portuguese for Saint Peter) is a parish in the municipality of Vila Franca do Campo in the Azores. The population in 2011 was 1,426, in an area of 2.48 km². It is located east of Ponta Delgada and Lagoa, south of Ribeira Grande and west of Furnas and Povoação. It is the smallest parish in area but the most densely populated in Vila Franca do Campo.
