= List of disasters in Portugal by death toll =

The following list of disasters in Portugal by death toll is a list of major disasters (excluding acts of war, terrorism or crime) which occurred in Portugal in a definable incident or accident, and which resulted in at least ten casualties.

Event	Type	Date	Location	Deaths	References
1755 Lisbon earthquake	Earthquake	1 November 1755	Continental Portugal	12000+ (est.)	
Ponte das Barcas collapse (Note: Although the tragedy happened in the context of a battle between French and Portuguese troops, the collapse of the bridge was an accident not directly caused by the battle.)	Structural failure	9 March 1809	Porto / Vila Nova de Gaia	4000 (est.)	
1522 Vila Franca earthquake	Earthquake	22 October 1522	Azores	3000–5000 (est.)	
1531 Lisbon earthquake	Earthquake	26 January 1531	Continental Portugal	1000–30000 (est.)	
1757 Azores Islands earthquake	Earthquake	9 July 1757	Azores	1000–1500 (est.)	
1803 Madeira floods and mudslides	Floods	9 October 1803	Madeira	600–1000 (est.)	
1967 Portugal floods	Floods	25–26 November 1967	Lisbon District	462+	
Independent Air Flight 1851 crash	Aviation accident	8 February 1989	Santa Maria, Azores	144	
TAP Flight 425 crash	Aviation accident	19 November 1977	Madeira	131	
Sinking of the San Pedro de Alcantara	Maritime accident	2 February 1786	Near the coast of Peniche	128	
1941 Iberian cyclone	Storm	14–16 February 1941	Continental Portugal	100+	
Custóias rail accident	Railway accident	26 July 1964	Matosinhos	90+	
Sinking of the Nuestra Señora del Rosario	Maritime accident	7 December 1589	Coast of Setúbal	80 (est.)	
1980 Azores Islands earthquake	Earthquake	1 January 1980	Azores	73	
Venezuelan Air Force C-130 Hercules crash	Aviation accident	3 September 1976	Terceira, Azores	68	
June 2017 wildfires	Wildfires	17-24 June 2017	Castanheira de Pera and Pedrógão Grande	66	
Viasa Flight 897 crash	Aviation accident	30 May 1961	Near the coast of Setúbal	61	
1909 Benavente earthquake	Earthquake	23 April 1909	Continental Portugal	60	
Hintze Ribeiro Bridge collapse	Structural failure	4 March 2001	Penafiel / Castelo de Paiva	59	
Martinair Flight 495 crash	Aviation accident	21 December 1992	Faro	56	
2010 Madeira floods and mudslides	Floods	20 February 2010	Madeira	51	
Cais do Sodré station roof collapse	Structural failure	28 May 1963	Lisbon	49	
Moimenta-Alcafache train crash	Railway accident	11 September 1985	Mangualde	49+	
Air France Flight 009 crash	Aviation accident	28 October 1949	São Miguel, Azores	48	
October 2017 wildfires	Wildfires	13-18 October 2017	Continental Portugal	45	
SA de Transport Aérien Flight 730 crash	Aviation accident	18 December 1977	Madeira	36	
SATA Air Açores Flight 530M crash	Aviation accident	11 December 1999	São Jorge, Azores	35	
Odemira rail accident	Railway accident	13 September 1954	Odemira	34	
1997 São Miguel floods and mudslides	Floods	31 October 1997	São Miguel, Azores	29	
2019 Madeira bus crash	Road accident	17 April 2019	Madeira	29	
Viana do Castelo train collision	Road/railway accident	1 May 1938	Viana do Castelo	28	
1966 Sintra wildfires	Wildfires	6-12 September 1966	Sintra	25	
Algueirão train collision	Railway accident	20 December 1965	Sintra	20	
Vila Franca de Xira derailment	Railway accident	16 August 1947	Vila Franca de Xira	17	
Recarei-Sobreira bus-train collision	Road/railway accident	26 April 1984	Paredes	17	
Póvoa de Santa Iria train collision	Railway accident	5 May 1986	Vila Franca de Xira	17	
Fratel bus crash	Road accident	6 November 2007	Vila Velha de Ródão	17	
1986 Águeda wildfires	Wildfires	14 June 1986	Águeda	16	
Glória Funicular derailment	Railway accident	3 September 2025	Lisbon	16	
1985 Armamar wildfires	Wildfires	8 September 1985	Armamar	14	
Vimieiro bus crash	Road accident	25 March 2001	Santa Comba Dão	14	
Storm Kristin	Storm	28 January 2026	Continental Portugal	14	
1816 North Atlantic earthquake	Earthquake	2 February 1816	Continental Portugal	13 (est.)	
Tunes bus crash	Road accident	8 April 1989	Silves	13	
Monte tree collapse	Tree collapse	15 August 2017	Funchal, Madeira	13	
1997 South Portugal floods	Floods	5 November 1997	Beja District	11	
Carvalhal bus crash	Road accident	27 January 2013	Sertã	11	
Vila Nova da Rainha community centre fire	Fire	13 January 2018	Tondela	11	
Gibalta rail accident	Railway accident	31 March 1952	Oeiras	10	
1983 Lisbon floods	Floods	18 November 1983	Lisbon District	10	
1998 Azores Islands earthquake	Earthquake	9 July 1998	Azores	10	
