= List of earthquakes in the Azores =

The following is a list of the prominent or destructive earthquakes occurring in the Azores, or affecting the populace of the archipelago:

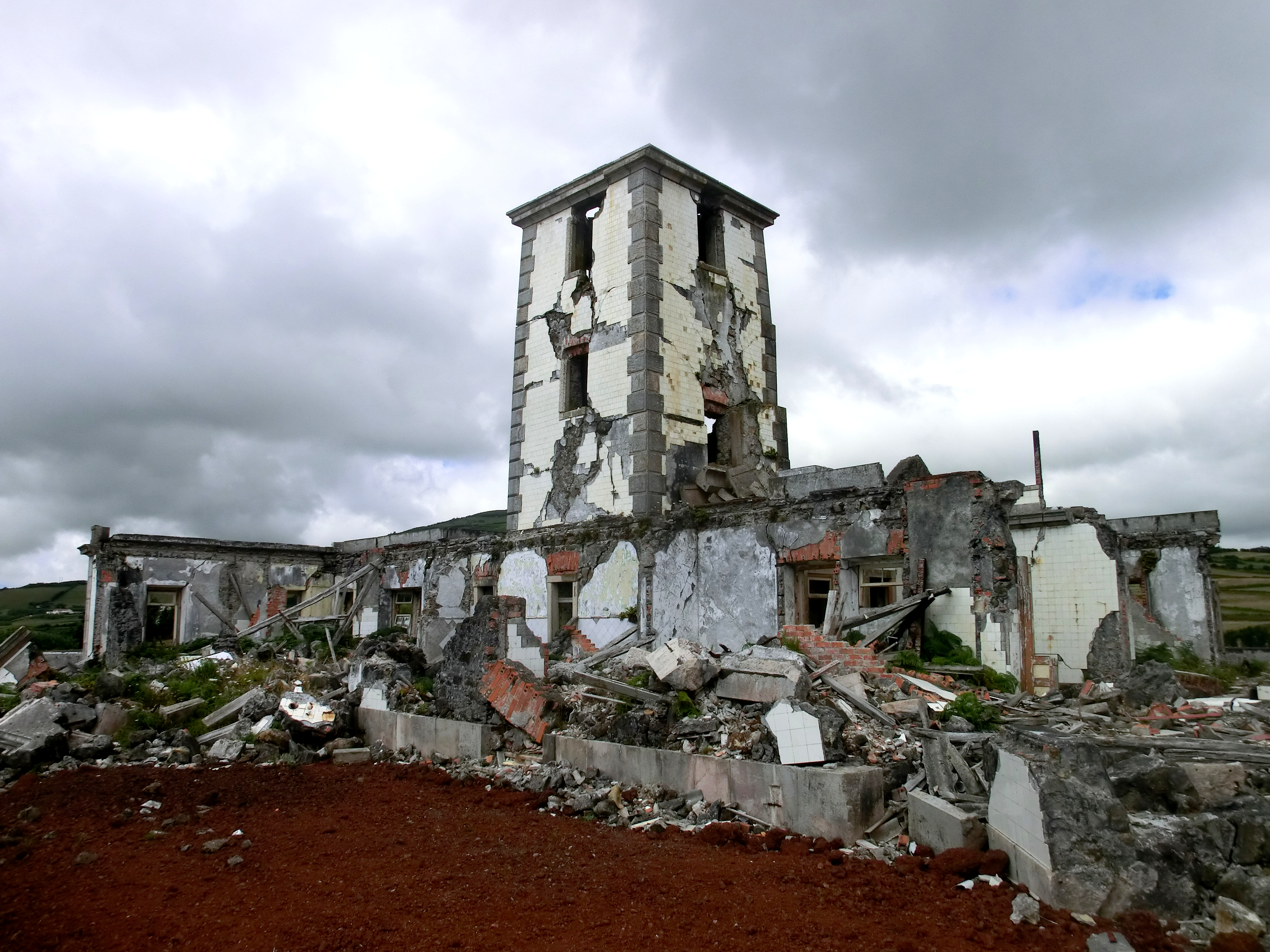
The iconic lighthouse after the events of the 1998 Ribeirinha earthquake.

== History ==
=== 16th century ===
- 1522 Vila Franca earthquake (22 October 1522)
- 1591 Vila Franca earthquake (26 July 1591)

=== 17th century ===
- 1614 "Caída da Praia" earthquake (24 May 1614)

=== 18th century ===
- 1717 Graciosa earthquake
- 1730 Graciosa earthquake (13 June 1730)
- 1757 Mandado de Deus earthquake (9 July 1757)

=== 19th century ===
- 1800 Terceira earthquake (25 June 1800)
- 1801 Terceira earthquake (26 January 1801)
- 1816 North Atlantic earthquake (2 February 1816)
- 1837 Graciosa earthquake (21 January 1837)
- 1841 "Caída da Praia" earthquake (15 June 1841)
- 1852 São Miguel earthquake (16 April 1852)

=== 20th century ===
- 1926 Horta earthquake (31 August 1926)
- 1932 São Miguel earthquake (5 August 1932)
- 1935 São Miguel earthquake (27 April 1935)
- 1937 Azores earthquake (21 November 1937)
- 1939 Azores earthquake (8 May 1939)
- 1950 Praia da Vitória earthquake (29 December 1950)
- 1952 São Miguel earthquake (26 June 1952)
- 1958 Capelinhos earthquake (13 May 1958)
- 1964 Rosais earthquake (21 February 1964)
- 1973 Santa Luzia-Santo António earthquake (23 November 1973)
- 1980 Azores Islands earthquake (1 January 1980)
- 1998 Azores Islands earthquake (9 July 1998)

== See also ==
- List of earthquakes in Portugal
