= Lomba da Maia =

- Civil parish
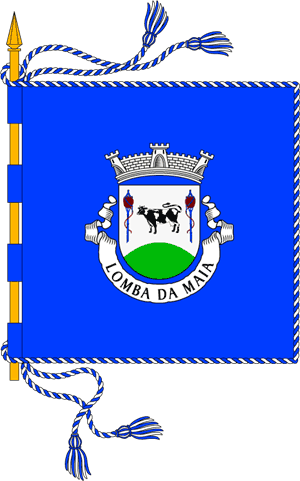
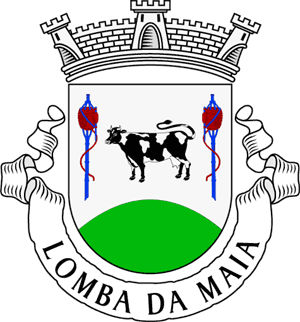
- Flag Coat of arms

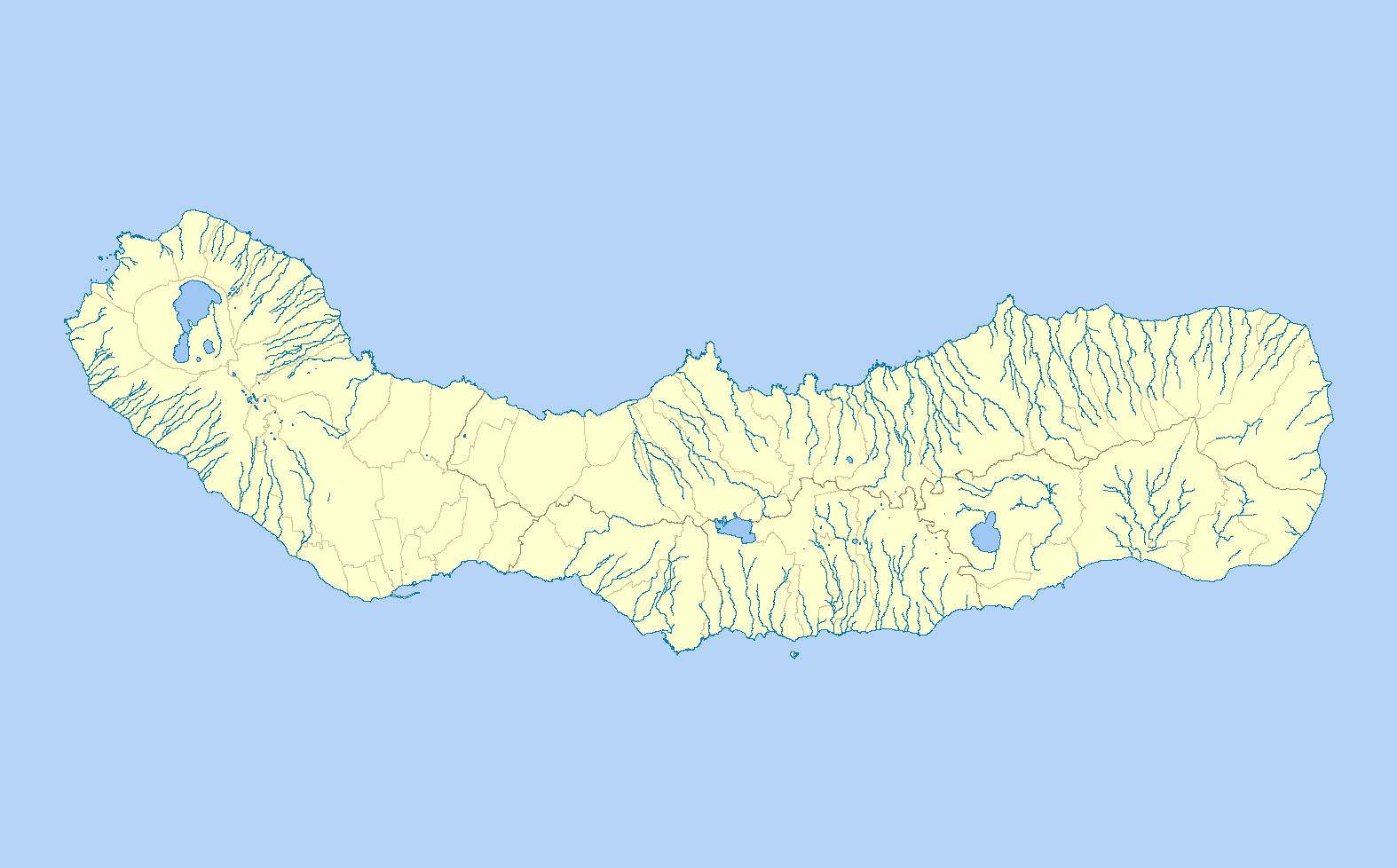
- Location in the Azores Lomba da Maia (São Miguel)
- Coordinates: 37°49′48″N 25°21′09″W
- Country: Portugal
- Auton. region: Azores
- Island: São Miguel
- Municipality: Ribeira Grande
- Established: Settlement: c. 1510; Parish: c. 1867; Civil parish: c. 1908

Area
  - Total: 20.47 km^{2} (7.90 sq mi)
- Elevation: 244 m (801 ft)

Population (2011)
  - Total: 1,152
  - Density: 56/km^{2} (150/sq mi)
- Time zone: UTC−01:00 (AZOT)
  - Summer (DST): UTC+00:00 (AZOST)
- Postal code: 9625-112
- Area code: 292
- Patron: Nossa Senhora do Rosário

Lomba da Maia is a civil parish in the municipality of Ribeira Grande in the Portuguese Azores. The population in 2011 was 1,152, in an area of 20.47 km^{2}. It is situated on a plateau that overlooks the northern coast and the neighboring parish of Maia.

== History ==
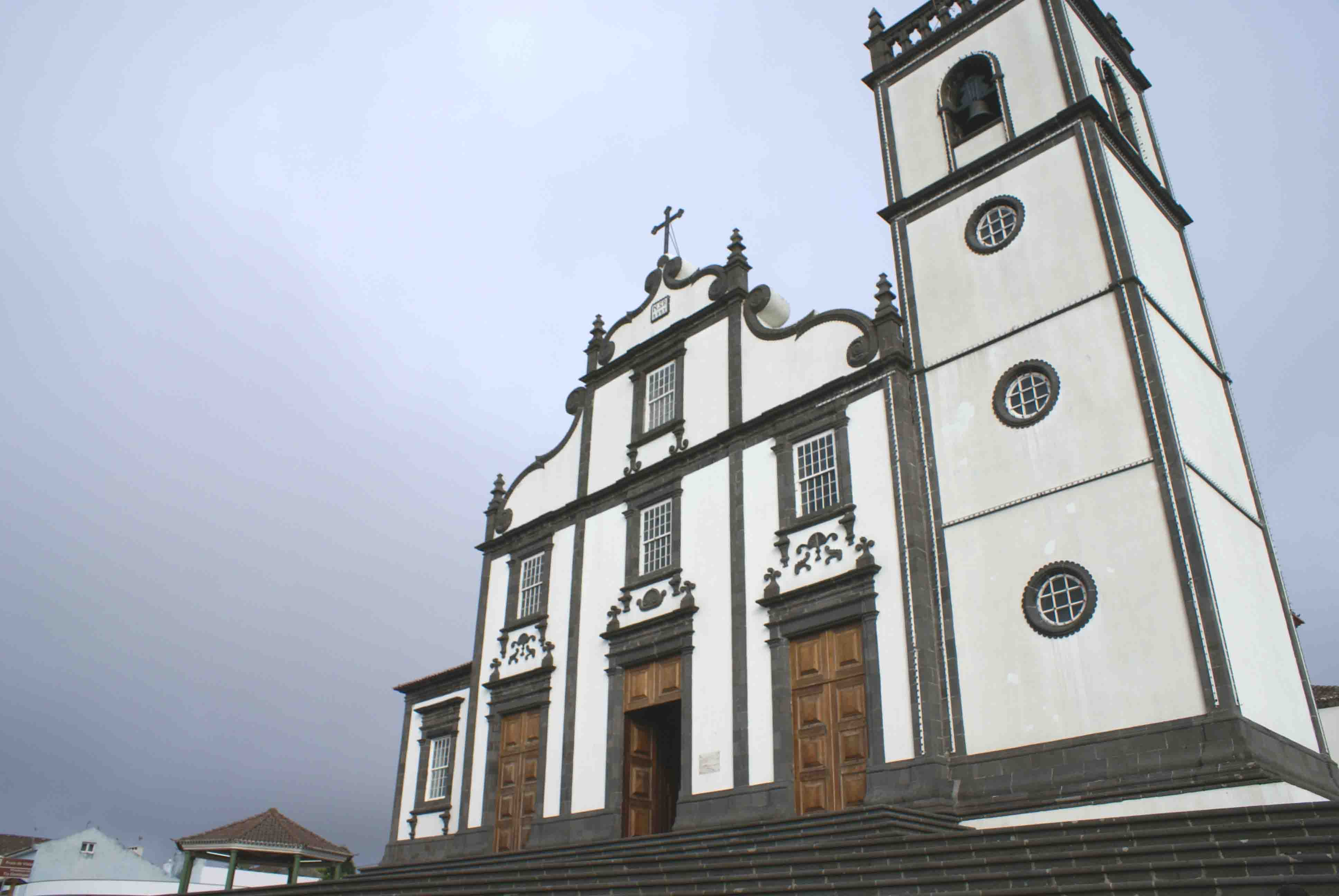
The front facade of the Church of Nossa Senhora do Rosário, in Lomba da Maia, constructed with donations in the 19th century

Little is known of the first settlers, although settlement may have occurred around 1510, and increased after the 1522 Vila Franca earthquake. Friar Montalverne indicated that the peoples of the area, thinking it to be Judgment Day, were admonished by the clergy to seek the blessing of Our Lady of the Rosary. thus beginning the regions devotion to this image of the Virgin.

The first temple constructed in Lomba da Maia to serve the public, was the Church of Nossa Senhora do Rosário (Portuguese: Igreja da Nossa Senhora do Rosário), a small chapel completed by the local clergy in 1867. But, this chapel was insufficient to serve the growing needs: a church was begun in 1868 and its construction was supported by donations from the local communities. Although construction slowed, its completion was made possible by Father Manuel Moniz Medeiros and master José Fidalgo, who invested most of their earnings to its completion. Lomba da Maia, for a long time remained an enclave of the nearby parish of Maia. With the completion of the church, to the invocation of Sant'Ana, there was a move to elevate the village to parish: a fact that occurred several years later.

At the end of the 16th century, Gaspar Frutuoso referred to the settlement briefly as: "Lomba da Maia part of the sunrise escarpment with Grotinha da Fonte and the sunset escarpment with Grota da Cruz". The chronicler, still, referred to the small chapel of Nossa Senhora do Rosário on Lomba Grande. Similarly, Francisco Afonso de Chaves e Melo wrote of the settlers of Lomba da Maia in the following terms: "after Porto Formoso is the locality of Maia, civil parish of Espírito Santo. This location is the best situated on the island and is likely to become a villa. There exists in this parish two clergy, whom are annexed to the Church of Nossa Senhora do Rosário da Lomba and Nossa Senhora da Alegria in Furnas."

Between 1707 and 1760, the parish of Furnas was integrated into Lomba da Maia.

The parish was finally elevated to the status of civil parish in 1908.

== Geography ==
The parish is situated along the centre of the northern coast of the island of São Miguel, 21 kilometres from the town of Ribeira Grande, and 39 kilometres from the district capital, Ponta Delgada. Its territory is planar from sharp coastal clips to the foothills of the Achada Plain, an area 600 meters above sea level. It is delimited in the east by course of the Ribeira Funda, which separates it from Fenais da Ajuda, west by the Ribeira das Faias, which separates it from the parish of Maia, and south by the limits of Ponta Garça.

=== Physical geography ===
Situated on the northern flank of the Furnas Volcanic Complex, the geomorpholy of Lombra da Maia is marked by its drainage basin that runs parallel to its lateral frontiers. As a result of the presence of easily erodable pumice covering the basaltic substratum, the valleys are profoundly carved forcing most settlements along a north–south orientation. Most of these valleys exceed 100 meters altitude, the rivers transporting most of the soils to the coast where they formed the Praia da Viola (a beach zone sited by early settlers for several mills).

=== Human geography ===
Population of Lomba da Maia (1911 - 2001)
Year	Pop.	±%
1911	1,522	—
1920	1,615	+6.1%
1930	1,845	+14.2%
1940	2,040	+10.6%
1950	2,453	+20.2%
1960	2,466	+0.5%
1970	1,950	−20.9%
1981	1,478	−24.2%
1991	1,053	−28.8%
2001	1,174	+11.5%

The parish includes two primary agglomerations:

- Lomba da Maia — the principal urbanized area of the parish, centered on the lomba that gave its name, is concentrated around the Church of Nossa Senhora do Rosário, and oriented north to south, parallel the principal ravines, to the north along the Rua da Igreja and to the south, along the highest point in the village in Trás do Outeiro. The civic center, almost all the public buildings and commerce, are located around the Church.
- Burguete — an area of less than 150 inhabitants, Burguete lies south of the Pico do Burguete, between the valleys of Ribeira da Faia (to the west) and Ribeira do Cavalo (to the east). The settlement has a linear structure (north to south), with the homes aligned along the principal street that parallels the right margin of the Ribeira da Faia.

The population during the 20th century was controlled by internal politics and emigration to the United States (the Johnson-Reed Act, fixed quotas on Portuguese emigration to the U.S.), which persisted until the end of the Second World War. A growing trend continued until the 1960s, when the Kennedy-Pastore Act was enacted, resulting in a 25% decrease in the community. People from Lomba da Maia, during the period between 1960 and 1970, emigrated to North America, primarily to Massachusetts and Rhode Island, but later to Canada. In addition, a small community of expatriates also settled in Bermuda.

== Economy ==
The economy of Lomba da Maia is dominated by agriculture, centered exclusively in dairy production. The effect of dairy production can be seen in the semi-permanent pasturelands throughout the interior, the cultivation of corn and silage, and the even the parish flag, which incorporates a Holstein cow. Further, the cultivation of tobacco, sugar beets and, until recently chicory, have been important crops historically, but have lost their importance to the dairy industry. Flax was also cultivated in this area, for the threshing mills of Riberia Grande.

In parallel, smaller businesses have supported these communities: commercial shops, cafés and more recently, the expansion of rural tourism, centered on the old Herdade de Nossa Senhora das Graças. The production of local ceramic tiles, also an historically important part of the community, has long since been discontinued, but continues on the area of Telhal (which is toponymic variation on the Portuguese word for tile).
