= Toledo (Velas) =

- Locality
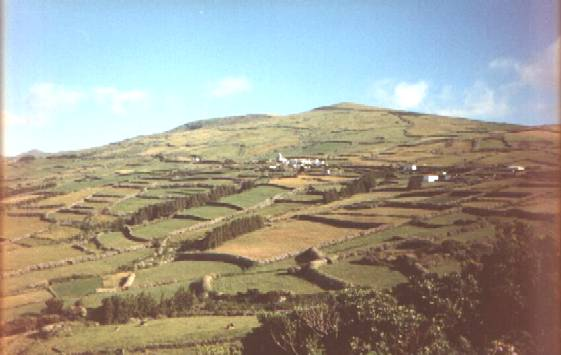
- The locality of Toledo, an unincorporated village in the municipality of Santo Amaro in the northern coast of the island of São Jorge
- Interactive map of Toledo
- Coordinates: 38°41′38″N 28°8′40″W
- Country: Portugal
- Autonomous Region: Azores
- Island: São Jorge
- Municipality: Velas
- Parish: Santo Amaro
- Aldeia: fl. 1450
- Elevation: 552 m (1,811 ft)

Population (2006)
  - Total: 60
- Demonym: Toledense
- Time zone: UTC-1 (Azores)
  - Summer (DST): UTC0 (Azores)
- Postal Zone: 9800-539 Velas
- Area Code & Prefix: (+351) 292 XXX XXX
- ISO 3166 code: PT

Toledo is an unincorporated human settlement in the civil parish of Santo Amaro, in the municipality of Velas in Portuguese island of São Jorge Island in the Azores.

== History ==
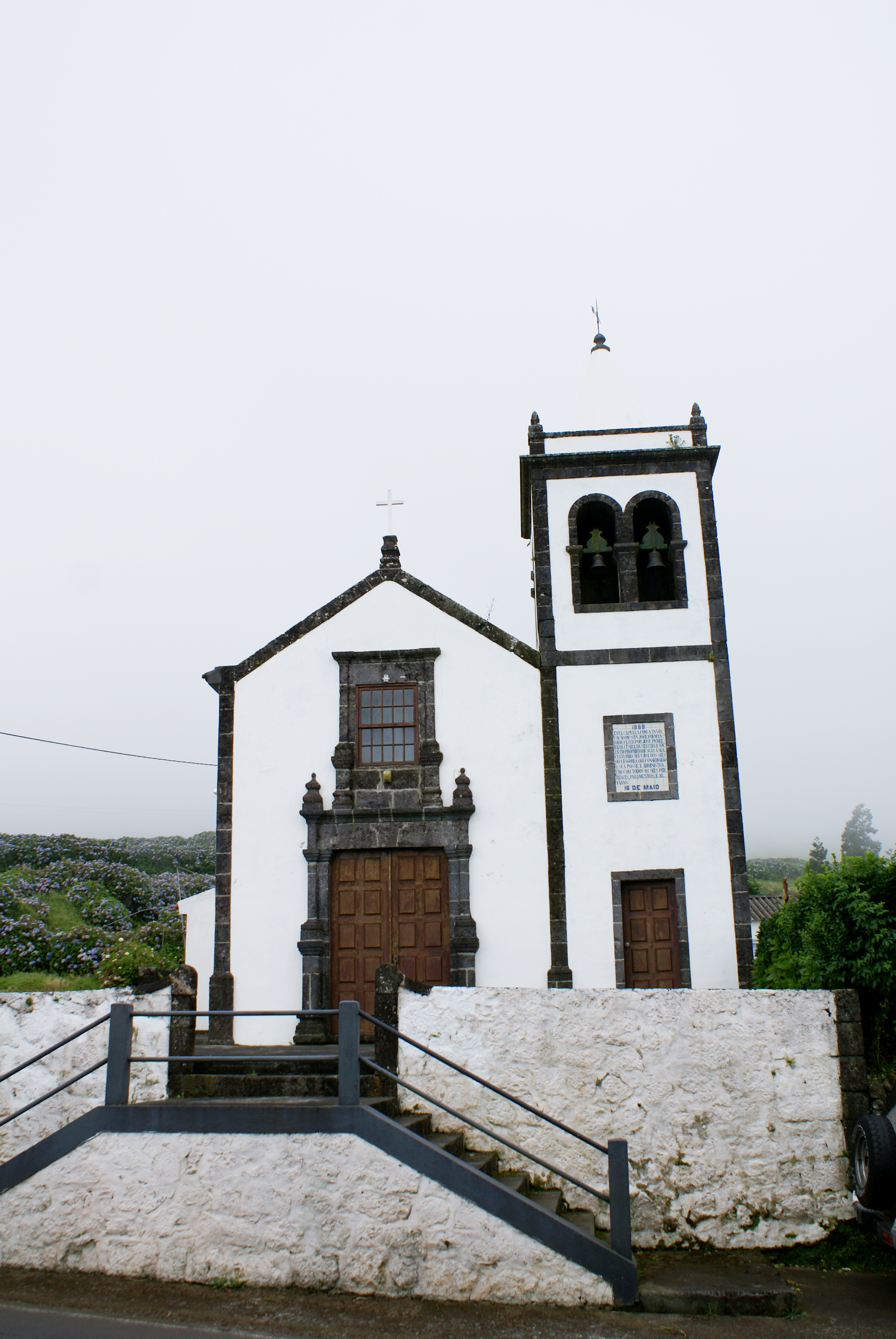
The Chapel of São José completed in 1879, through the initiative of José Pereira da Cunha da Silveira e Sousa

Although located in high altitude mountains of the northern coast, Toledo is situated with good access to potable water and springs, explaining its early settlement by Spanish and Portuguese colonists. Its name was likely given to the area by early settlers from the Toledo region in Spain, who arrived in the mid-15th and the 16th centuries, constructing houses and support structures to guard their animals and cereals, from rock excavated from cavities in the side of the mountain. These quarries were discovered in 2008, in the area of Ribeira Funda and Outeirão. The early settler families included Ávilas from Spain, Bettencourts of France (and the descendants of Jean de Bettencourt, the King of the Canary Islands), and the Silveiras (descendants of the Fleming Willem van der Haegen, the first settler of Topo). Further, immigrants from the Toledo region of Spain also settled in the region, including Teixeiras, Silvas, Matias, Constantinos, Oliveiras and Sousas.

Many of these early families also captured the waters of the region by constructing earthen/volcanic rock tanks for their animals and built cisterns or pools to collect water for local consumption. The original houses have long disappeared, even as the community thrived on the raising of swine for export or local consumption.

In the waters north of Fajã Rasa (near Ponta do Calhau), a Spanish cargo ship, Algorta, heavily laiden with cotton shipwrecked on 22 March 1864. The ship had nine crew members on board who were saved, but the ship was lost, its hulk deteriorating along the coast for years (with only the green-tinged rocks and partial frame lying along the black rocks off-coast as proof of the events).

Since the 18th century and until the 20th century, the lands around Toledo were used to produce wheat and rye, to be exported to continental Portugal. Today, there are few cereal crops cultivated in this region, the exception is corn, used for human and animal consumption. Toledo is primarily a cattle and herding society, with most dairy and beef cattle free-ranging throughout the year. Milk from dairy cattle is sold by the local farmers to produce the renowned São Jorge Cheese, a symbol of the islands protected food culture.

Under the supervision of José Pereira da Cunha da Silveira e Sousa, at that time president of the local government, the citizens of the Toledo constructed their first inter-communitarian house of worship, the Chapel of São José, the Império do Espírito Santo, cemetery and public fountain, in addition to a tunnel across Pico Alto (which they referred to as the Mina, or English: mine). The aim of this subterranean construction, completed in 1876, was to carry water from Fonte da Chã (in the south of the island), across Pico Alto, to the public fountain in the north of the island. The Mina de Água (English: Water Mine) as it was called, supported the population until the end of the 20th century, when water was finally piped in by the municipal government in Velas.

Around 2006, the settlement included between 50-60 residents, that were primarily dedicated to agriculture and cattle-raising. This is in sharp contrast to the 18th century, when 300 inhabitants resided in Toledo. It was the 15–21 February 1964 Rosais earthquake that affected these numbers, resulting in many local residents abandoning their homes, emigrating to Canada, the United States or Brazil (at least 153 people remained following this event). About 50% of the residences in Toledo were lost during the event, and forty years later there still remained temporary structures in the village to house many of the displaced, left by the U.S. Forces stationed at the Lajes Field. This also reduced the land under cultivation, the reduction in young residents and the exodus of large families from the community: Toledo has not recovered from this depopulation.

== Geography ==
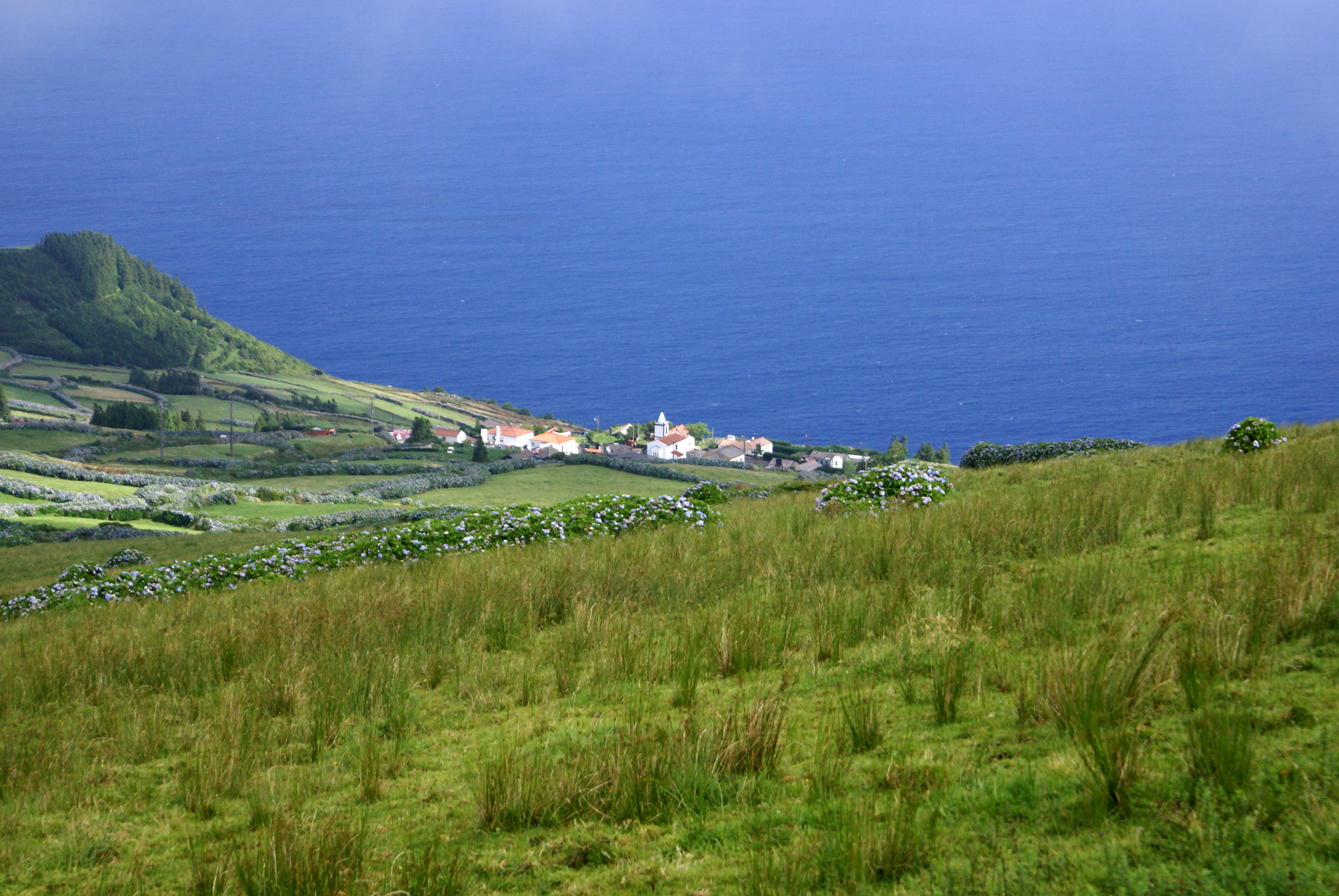
Partial vista of Toledo, as seen from the mountains, showing Pico do Loiçano overlooking the Fajãs

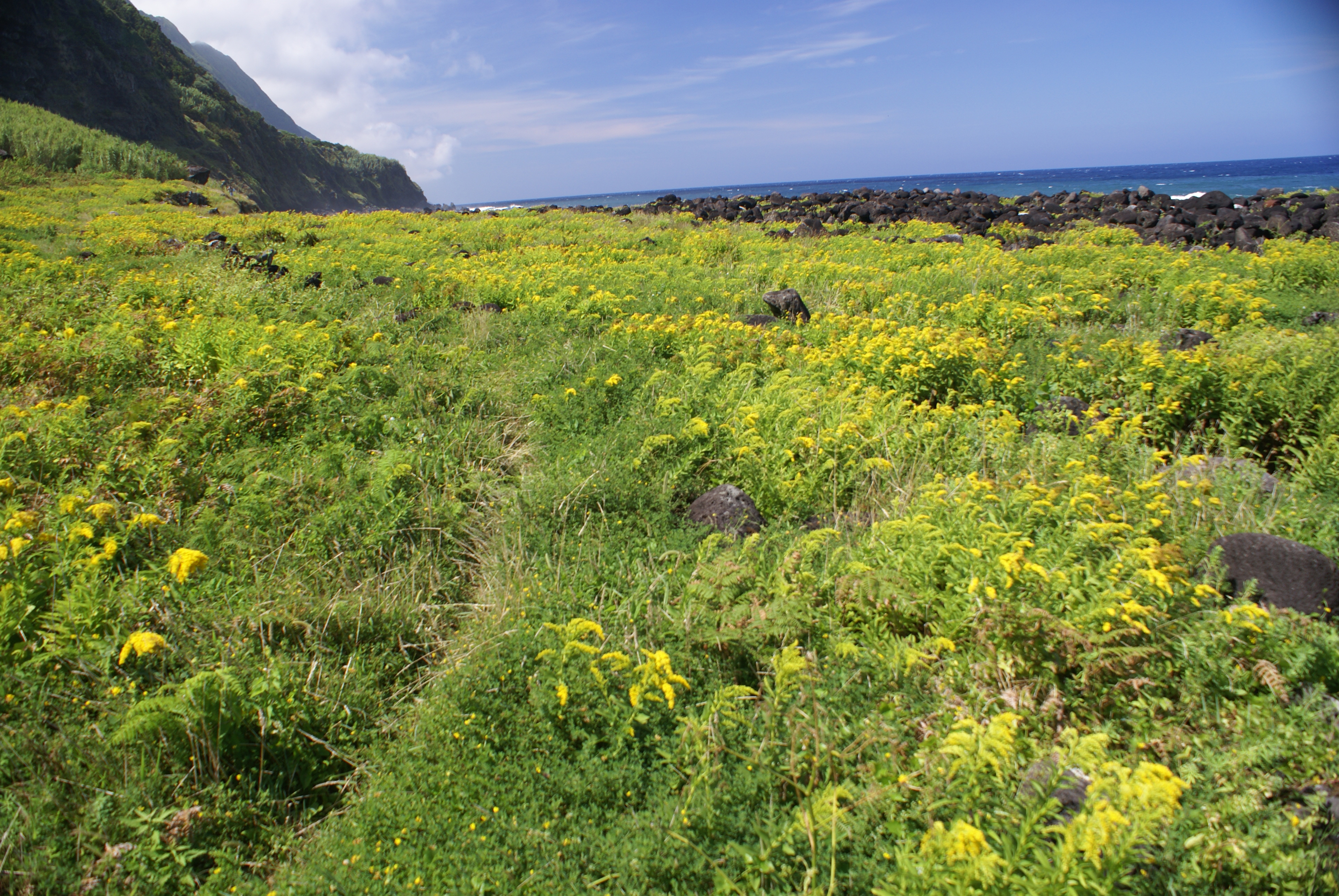
The vacant fields of Fajã Rasa

Toledo is located in the northwestern coast of São Jorge, nestled within high-altitude pasturelands and interspersed by Laurisilva forests.

Much of the lands occupied by its residents are located in three broad bands. The southern mountain range of Pico Alto (766 metres elevation), essentially an area of consolidated volcanic material and rock landscape, includes Nascente, Pico do Loiçano (411 metres) and Pico da Ponta Furada (622 meters). The latter two peaks are geologically created from two volcanic domes, but has been affected by sustained erosion. A second dome that includes Pico da Ponta Furada is divided between Toledo and neighbouring Santo António, was created by volcanism that formed Ponta Furada and which extended into the sea as a basaltic rock escarpment. The dome of Pico do Loiçano is located near one of the accesses to the Toledos' fajãs, namely Fajã de Vasco Martins and Fajã Rasa. From this location, apart from being able to witness the islands of Graciosa and Terceira, its height allows panoramic vistas of the northern community and the mountain of Pico Alto. From Pico Alto it is possible to glance at the southern and northern landscape of the island, the central group of islands, the delineated parcels of agricultural lands, hydrangeas bushes along the roadways and the cattle, swine, goats and sheep of the local farmers. Similarly, the coastal vistas allow overlooks of many of the coastal fajãs: Fajã de Vasco Martins, Fajã Rasa, Fajã da Ponta Furada and Fajã de Manuel Teixeira.

Toledo is known for its abundance of water, its springs and water courses, like the Ribeira do Raste, with its origin in area around Pico Alto, and travels the length of the settlement to merge with Fonte Velha (around Fajã de Vasco Martins) and continue to the sea, not before falling 80 metres to the rocks below. At this point the waters crash to the ground creating a natural pool, that was once used for local bathing but also as a fishing hole for local freshwater eel. Similarly, the Ribeira de Dona Ana (or Donana) and Ribeira do Grotão traverse the Toledo region, merging with the Ribeira da Quebrada and then dividing between Fajã do Caminho do Meio and Fajã Rasa. Ribeira das Hortas is also a water course, which has its origins around Canto da Serra and flows between the smaller springs of Pico Alto and Pico da Esperança.

== Culture ==
Traditionally, Toledo is active during the summer, resulting in celebrations that bring many of the locals into the streets, alleys and narrow passages to celebrate both religious and secular holidays. These events include traditional folk music with musicians from other islands, in addition to Trulu, Francisco Ferreira dos Santos (along with Ferreirinha das Bicas), Ferreirinha Filho, José Eliseu and other local musicians.

== See also ==
- Fajã de João Dias
