= 1964 Rosais earthquake =

- Location within Azores
- UTC time: ??
- ISC event: n/a
- USGS-ANSS: n/a
- Local date: 15 February 1964
- Local time: 7:00 a.m.
- Epicenter: 38.7°N 28.2°W
- Max. intensity: MMI VII (Very strong) – MMI VIII (Severe)
- Foreshocks: August 1962

The 1964 Rosais earthquake (Portuguese: Crise sísmica dos Rosais) was a series of seismic swarms occurring in February 1964, leading to two major earthquakes on 15 and 21 February, resulting in the destruction of most of the habitable dwellings on the western part of the island of São Jorge, in the archipelago of the Azores. The event resulted in the evacuation of approximately 5,000 residents from that island to Terceira, Pico and Faial.

== History ==
=== Geologic ===
The island of São Jorge is divided into two tectonic regions by tectonic fractures oriented north-northwest to south-southeast, located along an axis between Norte Pequeno and Calheta (the Ribeira Seca fault).

The northwest portion of the island is the most modern, consisting of basalt and intermediary rock (andesites) of the Rosais Volcanic Complex. This region was also covered swaths of the Manadas complex and debris from the 1580 and 1808 volcanic eruptions. The first eruption (1580) resulted in lava flows in three areas northwest to southeast: along the Ribeira da Almeida, in Queimada (south of Santo Amaro) and between Ribeira do Nabo and the beach of Cruzes (west of Urzelina). The second eruption (1808) resulted in andesite-basaltic lava flows in the southwest of Pico do Pedro, that extended to Urzelina.

The São Jorge-Pico Channel that separates the islands of Pico and São Jorge is divided by fractures and faults extending north-northwest to south-southwest. The northernmost group of faults on the island of São Jorge extend from Cerrado das Almas to the peak of Loiçano. But, the island is almost bisected by a fault that extends from the promontory of Rosais to just north of Calheta (in the southeast). The Rosais promontory, at a height of 250–400 metres (820–1,310 ft) above sea level, an area dominated by an area of scoria cones, the highest being Monte Trigo at 503 metres (1,650 ft) altitude. A final group of fractures aligned to scoria cones northwest of Velas: to the southeast there are faults towards Pico do Carvão, while to the northeast of Velas are fractures responsible for the submarine eruption in 1964.

São Jorge has had a history of tectonic movements associated with the submarine fractures between the island and Pico. The most violent of these events occurred on the night of 9 July 1757, with its epicenter in Fajã dos Vimes. This event resulted in landslides, opening fractures and resulting in the destruction of dwellings in Manadas (killing one fifth of the population, 1000 people).

=== Event ===
The February 1964 event was a phenomenon related to a submarine volcanic eruption 6.5 kilometres (4.0 mi) west-northwest of the village of Velas, 1,000 metres (3,300 ft) below sea level.

On 21 August 1963, tremors were felt in the central group of the Azorean archipelago, including in the epicenter located in the Pico-São Jorge Channel. This event resulted in damage to an area 100 kilometres (62 mi) around Cais do Pico, while the tremors reached an intensity of V-VI on the Mercalli intensity scale affected the parishes of Rosais, Santo Amaro and town of Velas. After 13 December, seismographs in the observatory in Horta registered earthquake swarms linked to a volcanic eruption that continued until January 1964, related initially with Capelinhos. There was a lull after December. On 29 January and 1 February 1964, two submarine cables with the São Jorge Channel were cut. On 14 February volcanic tremors began to be felt, but just as the populace had assumed that the swarm had ended, on 15 February 1964, around 7:00 a.m., the tremors resumed with a violent earthquake (VII-VIII on the Mercalli intensity scale, recorded in the village of Terreiros), that resulted in destruction of homes. Following this earthquake, within the next 24 hours, more than 179 tremors were felt (some reaching VI-VII on the Mercalli intensity scale) and 125 in the following day, before diminishing.

In the first three days, the epicentre was situated in the middle of São Jorge, in the proximity of historical eruptions in Urzelina and Manadas. In the beginning, the epicenter was located in Pico do Cabeço and Pico de Maria Pires, between Urzelina and Toledo, but later extended to the area of Pico da Esperança. The tremors reached a level VI (Strong) on the Mercalli intensity scale, causing panic and flight of citizenry to the town of Velas: the earthquake affected the areas of Urzelina, Manadas, Santo António and Norte Grande, intensifying until 18 February. On 18 February, the epicenters migrated to the northwest in the direction of the coast of Rosais, with the most intense tremors in the areas of Rosais, Beira, Velas, Santo Amaro, Manadas, Santo António and Norte Grande. A few reached level VIII in Velas and Rosais, where many of the homes were destroyed or became uninhabitable. After 18 February, low intensity earthquake swarms continued in the interior, with the largest hardly felt in Calheta or Topo.

A great number of tremors were noted that anticipated the next earthquake.

On 21 February, between 5:14 p.m. and 5:25 p.m. three strong earthquakes destroyed the homes in Rosais, and caused damage to dwellings in Toledo, Serroa, Beira and the village of Velas. The shocks attained VIII (Severe) on the Mercalli intensity scale in Velas and Rosais, VI (Strong) in Urzelina and Manadas, V (Moderate) in Santo António, Norte Grande, Norte Pequeno and Calheta, and III (Weak) in Topo. The more intense phase terminated on 24 February, at 8:45 p.m. After this event the tremors began to decrease in intensity and frequency, and few were registered in the western part of island. The earthquakes varied: epicenters in the centre of the island were situated approximately 5 kilometres (3.1 mi) in depth; and others, near Velas, were located 10–20 kilometres (6.2–12.4 mi) in depth. Similarly, the more violent tremors were felt in the islands near São Jorge. In total there were more than 500 aftershocks, with the event terminating on 25 February.

About 5,000 people abandoned the area affected by the earthquakes, most heading for Calheta; 1000 escaped over the São Jorge-Pico Channel. Coincidentally, after 15 February 1964, a storm had begun, and weather hampered the rescue operations, contributing to a feeling of panic among the populace. With lack of information, the constant tremors and poor weather conditions contributed to a general feeling of impending disaster among the citizenry. The stormy weather continued along the week. As a result of the first days earthquakes, there was significant destruction in the town of Velas and surrounding hamlets. Approximately 400 homes were destroyed, with many of the buildings requiring repairs (about 250 in total). The number of dwellings that were damaged exceeded 900.

Logically, the earthquakes presupposed a submarine volcanic eruption; the smell of sulphur was observed on 18, 19 and 20 February in the town of Velas, and later in Rosais, Beira, Santo Amaro and Norte Grande, and carried on the wind toward the southwest. Yet, the stormy weather made it impossible to see evidence. Meanwhile, a ship crossing the channel observed the presence of white caps on the surface of the water, indicating, possibly that there was a small eruption.

== Relief efforts ==
Owing to the general panic and lack of help, 5,000 people were evacuated to the islands of Terceira, Pico and Faial, and were lodged in local homes, in an act of solidarity.

The evacuation was extremely troubling, given the persistent storms and waves along the channel between the islands, where waves reached 5 metres (16 ft), and where ships and ports had limited capacity to transport the evacuees. A majority of the evacuees were transported onboard international cargo containers, including specifically the English flag-carrier Remuera, which was travelling within the Azores at the time of the crisis.

Lack of planning and excavation equipment, meant that many of the peoples fleeing their homes, leaving the possessions and abandoning their domestic animals. Even as many returned to their homes immediately following the events, many others remained on the island of Terceira, causing social problems and preoccupying locals. Many of the evacuees returned to the island onboard smaller yachts or ships from Pico (including the historic ships Santo Amaro, Espírito Santo and Terra Alta) and the cargo vessel Girão, which normally transported foodstuffs between the islands.

The Civil Governor, Teotónio Machado Pires (today remembered with a street named in his honour), visited the island and coordinated the relief operations.

American forces stationed on Terceira (at Lajes Airfield) provided tents and relief equipment, including communications equipment and aerial surveillance. By the late 20th century, there were still Quonset huts (metallic semi-circular huts/dwellings), invented for use in the Second World War, that were donated by the Americans to house many of those who had lost their homes.

The national government adopted measures to begin the reconstruction, that culminated in Decree-Law 45/685, on 27 April 1964], which authorized several measures to assist homeless.

=== Emigration ===
The lack of funds/resources during the reconstruction meant that emigration was the only exit strategy for many Jorgenses. With social and economic upheaval, particularly after the Capelinhos volcanic eruption, this was the only solution available: resulting in emigration to the United States, even as the Estado Novo regime tried to direct emigration to the African colonies.

In this context, with the active support of the State, the colony of Cela was established in Angola, essentially populated by homeless Jorgenses. Ironically, the independence drive, these colonists were left homeless and returned to continental Portugal, or ultimately to the United States.

== Aftermath ==
On 17 February, the municipal council of Velas, under the direction of president Duarte Sá, authorized the analysis of relief efforts, and deliberate the creation of a Central Commission, consisting of the president and vice-president, but also aldermen António Cristiano da Silveira and Manuel da Silva Bettencourt.

The Central Commission, later became a dependency of the Civil Governor, resulting in the creation of various sub-commissions, responsible for:

- Transport Commission (Comissão de Transportes), that included the commandants of the police and fiscal guard, whose function was to obtain and coordinate the transport necessary to handle operations;
- Installation Commission (Comissão de Instalação), that consisted of the chief of operations of the Junta Autónoma dos Portos and the president of the Junta de Freguesia das Velas, with the objective of preparing shelters for the populace;
- Social-Medical Assistance Commission (Comissão de Assistência Médico-Social), that included Health delegate and the Provedor of the Santa Casa da Misericórdia, who were responsible for assisting people requiring medial attention;
- Assistance Commission (Comissão de Assistência), guided by the president of administrative council of the União Nacional, to help collect, prepare and distribute foodstuffs to the population;
- Communications Commission (Comissão de Comunicações) formed by the Maritime Delegate and chief of the Postal/Telegraph Station, who were responsible fore maintaining communication services;
- Parish Commission (Comissões de Freguesia), functions in each parish, chief by the clergy, with the objective of supporting directly the people of each parish, establishing contact with the Central Commission.

== See also ==
- List of earthquakes in 1964
- List of earthquakes in Portugal
- List of earthquakes in the Azores
