= 1998 Azores Islands earthquake =

Earthquake in the Azores Islands, Portugal

- Location within Azores
- UTC time: 1998-07-09 05:19:07
- ISC event: 1165443
- USGS-ANSS: ComCat
- Local date: 9 July 1998
- Local time: 05:19:07
- Magnitude: M_{w} 6.1
- Depth: 10 km (6 mi)
- Epicenter: 12 km north of Horta; 38.650°N 28.626°W
- Type: Strike-slip
- Areas affected: Azores, Portugal
- Max. intensity: MMI VIII (Severe)
- Aftershocks: 10,600 recorded
- Casualties: 10 dead, 100 injured, 1,000 homeless

The 1998 Azores Islands earthquake (also known as the Faial earthquake) struck with an epicenter in the Atlantic Ocean, off the Azores Islands of Portugal at 05:19 local time. The 10 km (6.2 mi) deep mainshock, which measured 6.1 on the moment magnitude scale, was preceded by a strong foreshock 18 minutes prior. The mainshock was caused by movement on a strike-slip fault. A highly productive aftershock sequence followed with more than 10,600 recorded within four months. These aftershocks were mainly distributed across two west-southwest and south-southeast striking faults that intersect orthogonally off the coast of Faial while some occurred on faults associated with the Pedro Miguel graben on the island. The regional tectonics and kinematics suggests the shock occurred on the west-southwest trending plane. Elastic dislocation modelling further suggested that interaction between the primary rupture and faults of the Pedro Miguel graben could explain the GPS and geodetic ground deformation. The shock also caused some surface ruptures on the graben faults.

The earthquake caused significant damage on Faial Island with the villages of Ribeirinha and Espalhafatos almost completely destroyed. At least 10 people died, 100 were injured, and 1,000 people were left without homes. More than 3,900 homes, most on Faial and some on Pico Island, were damaged. The severity of damage was due to the dominance of non-seismic resistant construction on the island. After the earthquake, the Azores Islands regional government began reconstruction works at a cost of €255 million.

== Background ==
The Portuguese founded the first settlements on the islands in the 15th century. Since its founding, there has been at least 30 damaging and deadly earthquakes. The first recorded damaging earthquake occurred in 1522—it destroyed Vila Franca do Campo and caused over 5,000 deaths. Deadly earthquakes were also reported in 1787 and 1980. The largest recorded earthquake in the vicinity of the Azores was the 1941 magnitude 8.3 event which was associated with strike-slip faulting on the Eurasian–Nubian plate boundary.

== Earthquake ==
=== Tectonic setting ===
The Azores Islands are at a triple junction between the North American, Eurasian and African (Nubian) plates. The islands are atop a region of thickened crust called the Azores Plateau, where the crust is about 14–17 km (8.7–10.6 mi) thick. The well-defined Mid-Atlantic Ridge represents the North American–Eurasian and North American–Nubian boundaries representing two arms of the junction. Regionally, the third arm, the Eurasian–Nubian boundary, is represented by the Terceira Rift. This rift is a northwest–southeast to west-northwest–east-southeast trending zone of alternating basin and volcanic ridges. The southeastern Terceira Rift joins the Gloria Fault, which represents a significant portion of the Azores–Gibraltar Transform Fault. With the exception of Flores and Corvo, situated on the North American Plate, all of the Azores Islands lie west of the Mid-Atlantic Ridge. There is no agreed plate boundary type for the Azores–Gibraltar Transform Fault, which bounds the Eurasian and African plates. Scholars have suggested it is a transform fault, leaky transform fault, oblique spreading center or rift zone.

The two primary fault styles around the 1998 earthquake epicenter are west-northwest–east-southeast and north-northwest–south-southeast trending systems with steep dip angles. The west-northwest–east-southeast striking faults exhibit oblique-slip faulting with sinistral and normal components. Active faults are also present on Faial Island, concentrated in the Pedro Miguel graben. Within the graben, there are seven east-southeast striking faults with normal and dextral slip components. Similar-trending faults have been reported south of Caldeira Volcano and on the western part of Faial.

=== Geology ===
A strong foreshock was recorded at 05:01, which alerted residents near the epicenter. The mainshock occurred at 05:18 with an epicenter near that of the foreshock. The earthquake, measuring a moment magnitude of 6.1, struck at a depth of 10 km (6.2 mi). It was caused by sinistral strike-slip faulting along a north-northwest–south-southeast trending fault. Most earthquakes on the islands are associated with volcanism, making the 1998 a rare and large one of tectonic origin. The strike-slip faulting mechanism was also unusual as most earthquakes in the area occur because of normal faulting.

Using GPS and geodetic data, two nearly vertical rupture planes were identified as possible sources. One was a west–southwest trending dextral fault with a dimension of 9.5 by 4.6 km (5.9 by 2.9 mi). The other was a south–southeast trending sinistral fault with a dimension of 9.6 by 4.2 km (6.0 by 2.6 mi). These dimensions were consistent with the expected size of a M_{w} 6.1 earthquake derived from the geodetic data. In both slip planes, coseismic slip occurred at 2 to 6 km (1.2 to 3.7 mi) depth within the crust and peaked at about 1 m (3 ft 3 in).

An estimated 10,600 aftershocks recorded were recorded in the first four months. These aftershocks delineated the two orthogonal fault planes; one trending west-southwest and the other south-southeast. Some also occurred on the Ribeirinha and Lomba Grande faults of the Pedro Miguel graben. These aftershocks were located at depths of 3–13 km (1.9–8.1 mi) with the shallow ones occurring on the graben. The regional kinematics and damage distribution of the mainshock suggest the west-southwest plane was the source of the mainshock.

Elastic dislocation modelling showed that a dextral fault with a dimension of 12 by 5.5 km (7.5 by 3.4 mi) slipping up to 1.17 m (3 ft 10 in), and slip on two graben faults (Ribeirinha and Lomba Grande faults) could reproduce the observed geodetic deformation, aftershock distribution, and damage. In the model, the rupture parameters of the graben faults were 2 by 1 km (1.24 by 0.62 mi) with 15 cm (5.9 in) of normal slip and 2.2 by 1 km (1.37 by 0.62 mi) with 34 cm (13 in) and 14 cm (5.5 in) of normal and sinistral displacement, respectively. Coulomb stress changes caused by the mainshock triggered aftershocks on the south-southeast trending fault.

=== Surface ruptures ===
The earthquake caused surface ruptures that were mainly reported in the uplifted fault blocks of the Ribeirinha, Chã da Cruz and Lomba Grande faults. Dextral fractures and south-facing vertical scarps on the order of several centimeters occurred near the Chã da Cruz Fault. There was also a 10–20 cm (3.9–7.9 in) scarp where the Lomba Grande Fault cuts beneath a road. These ruptures were discontinuous with some reaching 10 m (33 ft) long. Some of the deformation were open cracks while others contained strike-slip, normal or oblique-normal offsets. In areas where the fault's geometry inhibited the strike-slip component to produce zones of compression, ridges formed. Pull-apart basins formed in areas where bends in the fault caused localised extension. The location of surface ruptures were consistent with the linearment of previously mapped faults in northeastern Faial and had a slip vector consistent with them.

=== Ground motion ===
Strong ground motion map

The Modified Mercalli intensity on Faial ranged from V to VIII. Damage to the towns of Ribeirinha and Espalhafatos in northeastern Faial were consistent with intensity VIII effects. The earthquake's intensity does not follow a simple seismic attenuation relationship with its distance from the epicenter; although Lombega, a village on southwest Faial, had intensity VII effects, the surrounding area was assigned intensity V. On Pico, areas closest to the epicenter were assigned intensity VI while Piedade at the eastern part experienced intensity III. Some areas of Pico experienced localised intensity VII, including Almagreira, whereas intensity IV was reported in the surrounding area. On São Jorge, areas closest to the epicenter was assigned intensity V while Topo at the eastern end experienced intensity III. The earthquake was also felt in Graciosa (IV), Terceira (III–IV), and São Miguel (III).

=== Impact ===
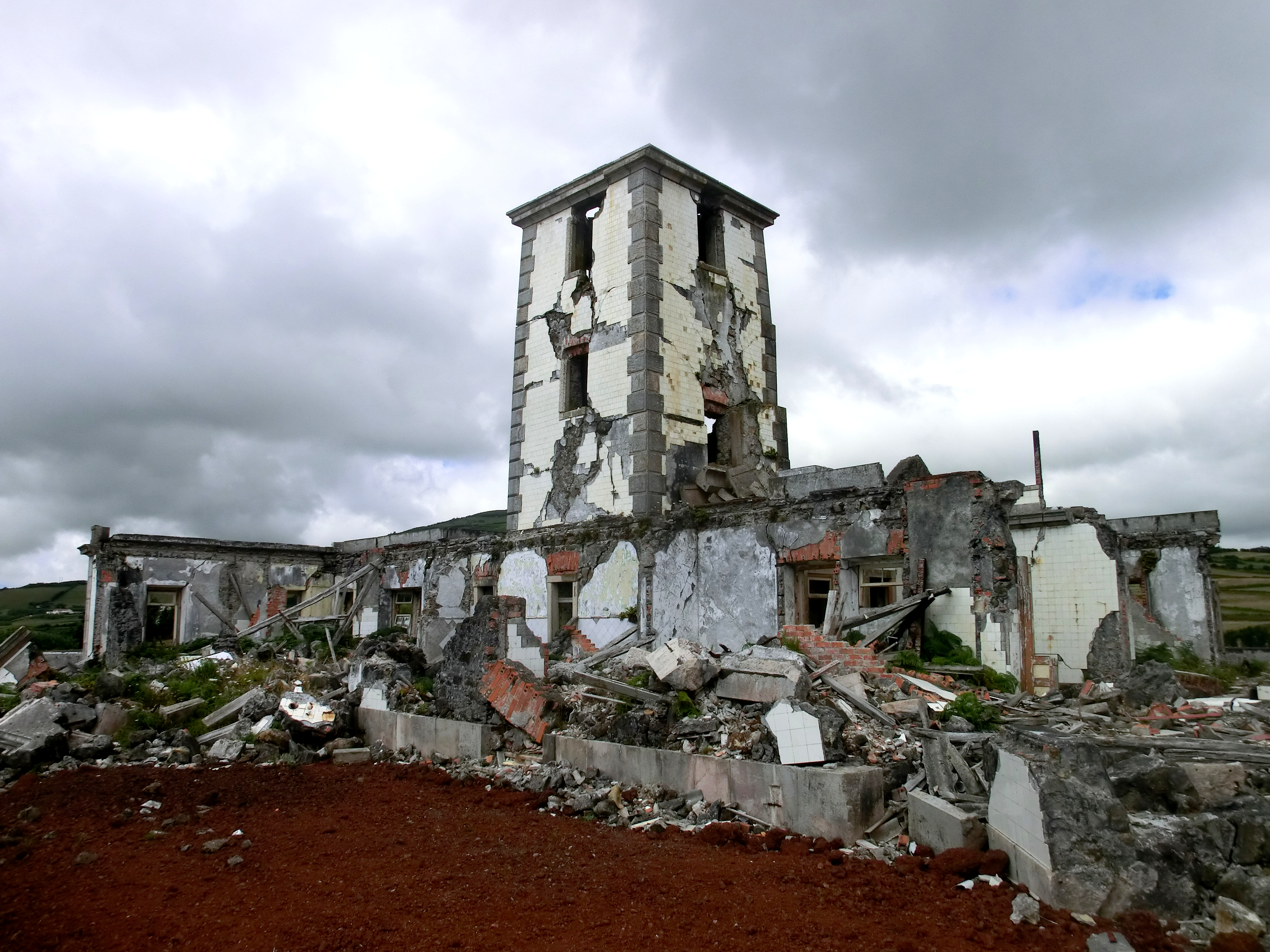
The Ribeirinha lighthouse after the earthquake

The earthquake killed 10 people, injured 100, and left 1,000 others homeless on Faial. More than 3,900 buildings were damaged; many of them were on Faial, while some damage also occurred on Pico. About 70 percent of homes on Faial were destroyed while 20 percent of them were damaged on Pico.

The villages of Espalhafatos and Ribeirinha were almost completely destroyed while significant damage was reported in Pedro Miguel, Salão and Cedros. In these settlements, some 1,500 homes were heavily damaged and half had to be torn down. Some buildings fared better; newer constructions were undamaged even in areas of extreme damage. The traditional construction methods and materials used in many homes were not designed for earthquakes, resulting in the heavy damage. Many homes were made from stone and clay or mortar with wooden partition acting as walls. Furthermore, most of the buildings damaged had two or three floors; in some instances, their masonry walls completely toppled or had large cracks. Closest to the epicenter, the Ribeirinha lighthouse sustained large cracks in its tower to mid-height and rotated 15–20 cm (5.9–7.9 in) clockwise.

As most schools were reinforced-concrete construction, they sustained little to no damage. However, a kindergarten in Salão had to be demolished because its external masonry walls collapsed. At another school in Espalhafatos, the concrete and reinforced masonry components separated. Churches that suffered severe damage were primarily masonry construction. Shear failure of the walls was a common damage pattern observed in churches. In the Ribeirinha Church, the arch between the nave and apse completely collapsed.

== Aftermath ==
The initial rescue effort in northern Faial was hampered by toppled trees and landslides that blocked roads. In response to the road conditions, the national radio station said four aircraft from the air force were planned to support evacuation and aid deliveries. Rescuers spent the night looking for survivors and retrieving bodies among the rubble. Concerned about aftershocks, the residents of Faial and Pico slept inside tents provided by the government. The Portuguese Air Force deployed a Lockheed C-130 Hercules plane carrying tents and several thousand blankets from Lisbon; medical teams and supplies also arrived. Prime minister António Guterres visited Faial Island to survey the devastation. The United States ambassador to Portugal, Gerald S. McGowan, declared the earthquake a disaster on 17 July. The Office of Foreign Disaster Assistance later allocated US$22 thousand to the embassy for the Portuguese government to purchase lavatory essentials. The Portuguese government dispatched medical doctors and nurses to treat the injured while sniffer dogs were mobilised for rescue missions.

The regional government was tasked with reconstruction, resettlement and recovery, estimated at €255 million. (Note: In 1998 monetary value) One of the largest recovery efforts in the island's history, it involved constructing 670 prefabricated homes. About 72 percent of the reconstruction project was funded by the regional government while the remaining was from nationwide public funds. The reconstruction projects drastically changed the architecture of buildings on Faial as traditional stone and mud homes were replaced with ones built with blocks, iron and cement.

== See also ==
- List of earthquakes in 1998
- List of earthquakes in the Azores
- List of earthquakes in Portugal
