= 1967 Portugal floods =

Natural disaster in Portugal

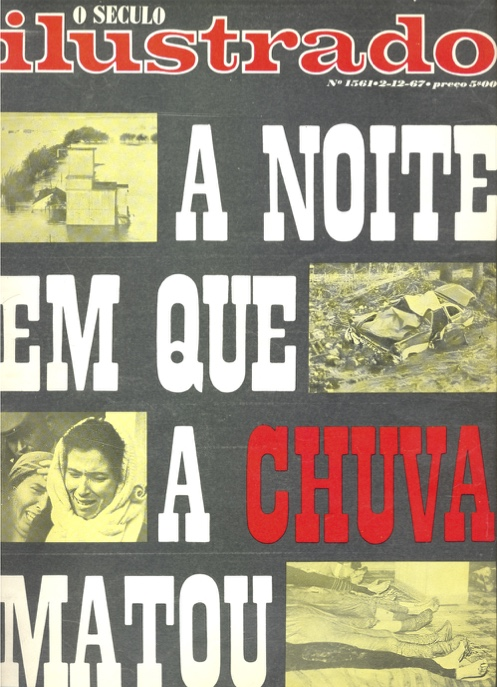
- Newspaper "O Século Ilustrado" cover in 2 December 1967. The title reads: "The night in which rain killed."
- Date: 25 and 26 November 1967
- Location: Lisbon Metropolitan Area
- Deaths: 500-700+

The 1967 Portugal floods were flash floods that took place in 25 and 26 November 1967, Portugal, in the Lisbon metropolitan area, affecting 14 municipalities. It was the deadliest flood recorded in Portugal, with 500-700 deaths, more than half of all the nation's fatalities from flooding in 100 years. It was also the deadliest natural hazard in Portugal since the 1755 Lisbon earthquake.

== Background ==
The network of river basins affected by the flood were small (17 with basin areas smaller than 40 km^{2}) or medium-sized (Trancão River, Alenquer River, and Grande da Pipa River, all with basin areas ranging from 100 to 300 km^{2}). However, their natural characteristics (slope, low permeable formations, etc.) enable them to generate flash floods, a risk that some of the affected areas still had in 2005.

Extreme poverty and high birth rates had led to a rural flight towards the main cities of Portugal, particularly the Lisbon metropolitan area. Some of these newcomers, lacking money, would build their houses illegally, occupying plains prone to flooding and river banks.

== Flood details ==
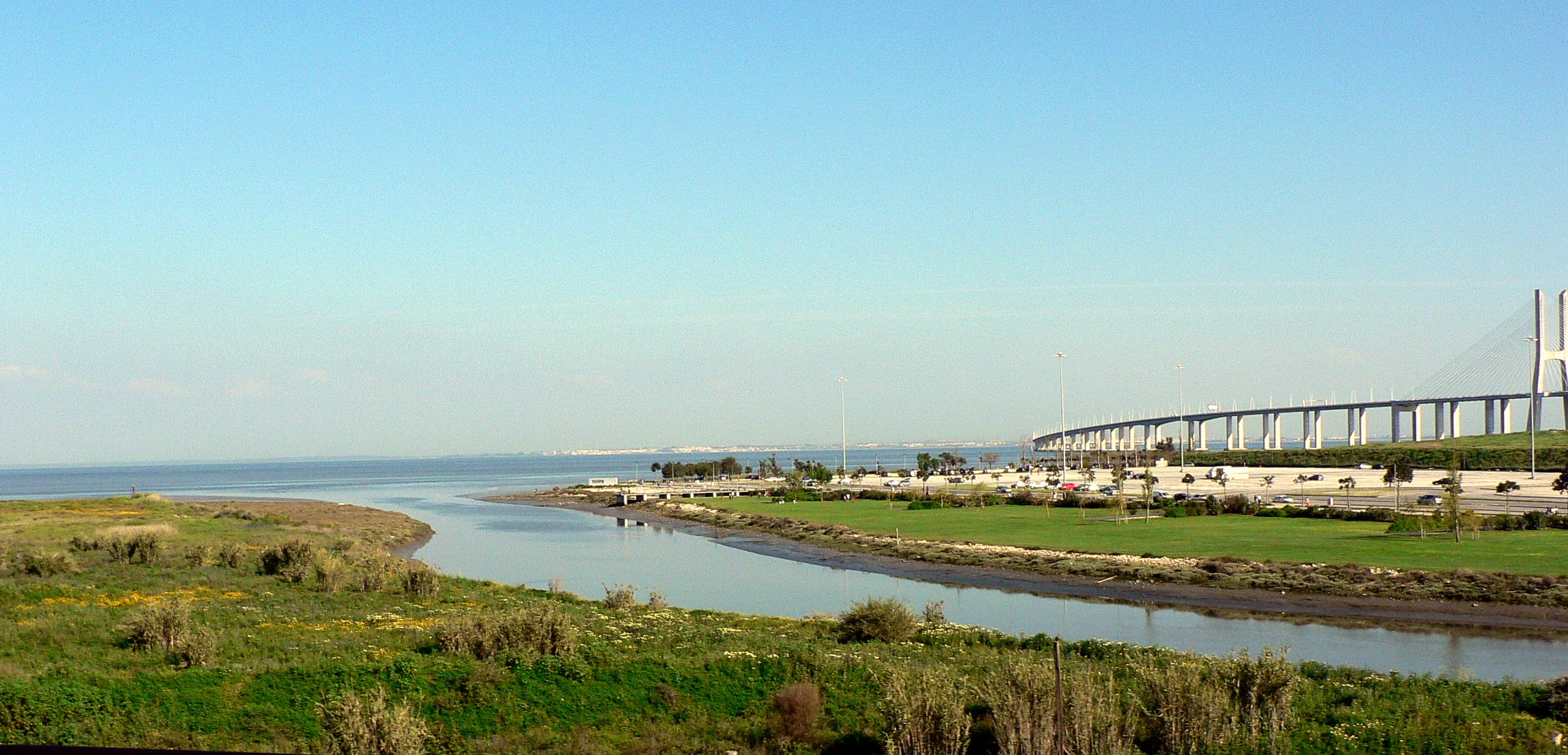
Mouth of the Trancão River, one of the three largest rivers involved in the flood.

Heavy rainfall occurred during the night of 25 November 1967. The rain was most intense (>120 mm) in the metropolitan area of Lisbon, particularly in a 60 km line between Estoril and Alenquer, but intense rain (>75mm) affected a large area in an axis of South West to North East orientation from Lisbon to the border with Spain. Most of the rain fell in a five-hour interval, between 7 p.m. and midnight. Another factor that increased the impact of the flood that followed was the high tide, which was highest between 6 p.m. and 1 am.

The rain led the water levels of the Tagus river near Lisbon and its tributaries to rise 3 to 4 meters, flooding many houses up to their first floor. The flood became laden with debris, consisting of stones and mud, as well as wood, tiles and metal from houses and people's belongings.

The flood took most people by surprise as they were home or already sleeping and no flood alert system existed at the time. Its negative effects were worse in Odivelas riverside and in the Trancão River margins. The mud dragged away many bodies, so it was difficult to estimate casualties. The official death toll was 495 deaths; unofficial estimates are at least 700 deaths. Based on available sources (such as newspapers), there were 2045 people registered as being directly affected by the flood: 522 dead, 330 injured, 885 who lost their home, 307 who were evacuated and one missing person. Most of the dead were originally from rural areas, namely North and Alentejo and almost one fifth of the registered dead lived in a small village called "Aldeia de Quintas" (100 dead). Furthermore, the river destroyed two bridges, one in Odivelas, the other in Trancão.

A leptospirosis outbreak potentially followed the flood, but the number of infected people is not known.

== Aftermath ==
Firefighters, soldiers, student associations and the Red Cross, among others, offered relief to the victims by providing shelter, medicine, food, etc. A firefighter of Odivelas reports that some people were sheltered in the local fire department for more than a month. Almost 6,000 students were involved in disaster relief. The students created a Central Coordinating Commission in Instituto Superior Técnico's student association that was in charge of coordinating the students' relief efforts. The students would write their experiences and reflections through some outlets that were already established, such as the Comércio do Funchal, and some new, such as the Solidariedade Estudantil. Students of the University of Porto (with fundraising) and University of Coimbra (with medical support) also helped. These floods are considered by some as a pivotal moment that would lead to the Academic Crisis of 1969 and the Carnation Revolution. Despite this, the event is not frequently evoked and the academic literature focuses mostly on the meteorological aspects of the event.

The government attempted to censor the extent of the tragedy by not allowing television to display images of the dead and downplaying the casualty numbers newspaper reported. On 26 November 1967, Diário de Lisboa's front page reported more than 200 dead, while Diário de Notícias in 29 November reported 427 dead before the censorship prevented further public tallies from being reported. Some journal editors self-censored information they thought could lead the whole text to be rejected. In 29 November, the local censorship delegations received instructions to remove all references to the students' relief efforts. PIDE interrogated the United Press International correspondent Edouard Khavessian about coverage of student protests against the way the government was dealing with the disaster.

"[...] only the violence of the phenomenon of exceptional character, registered in the dramatic hours of the night of 25 to 26 of November, can fully explain the greatness of the damages caused." – Ministry of the Interior's note on Diário de Lisboa, 1967.

"[...] we wouldn't say: it was the floods, it was the rain. Perhaps it is fairer to say: it was misery, misery that our society did not neutralize, that caused the majority of deaths. Even in death it is sad to be miserable. Especially when you die for being miserable." – Comércio do Funchal, No. 1963, 1967.

Newspapers closer to the regime would frame the catastrophe as unpredictable and would focus on the wave of grief and solidarity that followed. Others, such as the Portuguese Communist Party (then an illegal party) and student publications, focused on social factors as the main cause. For example, the Solidariedade Estudantil bulletin would point out that the peak of the rain had occurred in Estoril, while most deaths would occur in the Lisbon slums. Soon after the floods, Gonçalo Ribeiro Telles appeared on national television (Rádio e Televisão de Portugal) establishing a direct link between the lack of spatial planning and the dimension of the tragedy.

Since 1967, comparable events of intense precipitation have occurred in 1983 and 2008, but neither led to as many deaths or evacuated people as the 1967 floods. While some of the most affected areas were not repopulated after 1969, such as the Santa Cruz da Urmeira neighborhood in Odivelas (20 killed, 30 injured, 100 homeless), other areas were repopulated and have since expanded closer to the river banks. New neighborhoods, such as the Bairro do Vale do Forno, have since been constructed near the river banks. In effect, many areas, at least in the Odivelas area, still had high risk for flash floods as of 2005, but the local population does not consider their personal risk to be high (58%) and do not have insurance that would protect them in case of a flood (82%).

== See also ==
- List of deadliest floods
- Estado Novo
