= 1816 North Atlantic earthquake =

Earthquake near the Azores Islands

- Location within North Atlantic
- Local date: 2 February 1816
- Local time: 00:40
- Magnitude: M_{w} 8.6 ± 0.3 (8.3–8.9)
- Epicenter: 37.8°N 19.8°W
- Type: Unknown
- Areas affected: Atlantic Ocean
- Casualties: 13+ dead

The 1816 North Atlantic earthquake occurred on 2 February somewhere between the Azores Islands and Lisbon, Portugal. The estimated moment magnitude 8.3–8.9 earthquake had an epicenter offshore in the Atlantic Ocean, and was felt in Lisbon at 00:40 local time. Little is known about the quake, but it is believed to be one of the largest to have struck the Atlantic.

== Tectonic setting ==
Between the Strait of Gibraltar and Azores is where the African (Nubian), and Eurasian Plates meet along the Azores–Gibraltar Transform Fault. Near the Azores, the two plates meet the North American plates at the ridge-ridge-fault Azores triple junction on the Mid-Atlantic Ridge, a 16,000-km-long divergent boundary on the seafloor of the Atlantic Ocean which separates the Eurasian plate from the North American plate. East of the Azores is the Azores–Gibraltar Transform Fault, specifically the strike-slip Gloria Fault which serves as the boundary between the Nubian and Eurasian plates.

The plate boundaries are seismically active as they accommodate elastic strain caused by movements of the plates, and release the strain during large earthquakes. Two of the largest recorded earthquakes in the vicinity of the Azores were the M_{w} 8.1 1941 Gloria Fault and M_{w} 7.9 1975 North Atlantic earthquakes, which were associated with strike-slip faulting on the Azores–Gibraltar Transform Fault. The Azores–Gibraltar Transform Fault is also thought to be the source of the 1755 and 1761 Lisbon earthquakes which generated notable tsunamis.

== Earthquake ==
Past estimates of the event have assigned a magnitude of between 6.7 and 7.6, with a macroseismic intensity of IV to VI at Lisbon and Seville. An epicenter location along the Gloria Fault is commonly plotted. Reassessment of the seismic intensity based on historical documentation suggests it was only felt V in Seville. The shock had a maximum intensity of VII evaluated and assigned to Madeira. Based on simulating the documented seismic intensities on a computer, a moment magnitude of 8.6 ± 0.3 was obtained. The reevaluated epicenter location places it just northwest of the 1941 earthquake epicenter, near the Gloria Fault.

== Impact ==
According to reports from the Gazeta de Lisboa, the shock was felt at 00:40 local time for up to a minute or a minute and a half. Many residents were driven out of their homes and some structures suffered minor damage. The shaking was described as moving in a northeast–southwest direction and was felt throughout Portugal. Two Portuguese vessels; the Paquete de Lisboa and Marquez de Angeja located 600 km and 1,400 km from Lisbon respectively reported disturbance of the sea in the Netherlands. The quake was felt in Seville, Spain but no damage was reported. In Ovar, six homes were destroyed, killing 12 people. An elderly lady was among those killed, caused by panic during the quake. One person also died in Lisbon due to panic.

Up to six minutes of strong shaking was reported in Madeira. The quake was felt through the island, and on nearby Porto Santo Island. On the Azores Islands, American historian William Hickley Prescott wrote in a letter that violent shaking continued for 3.5 minutes, seriously damaging homes and other structures.

There are no reports suggesting a tsunami struck the coast. Much information and observations of the event in Lisbon is nonexistent due to the aftermath of the Napoleonic Wars, and the ongoing famine associated with the Year Without a Summer.

== See also ==
- List of earthquakes in Portugal
- List of earthquakes in the Azores
