= Trancão River =

Coordinates: 38°47′46″N 9°5′24″W

Trancão
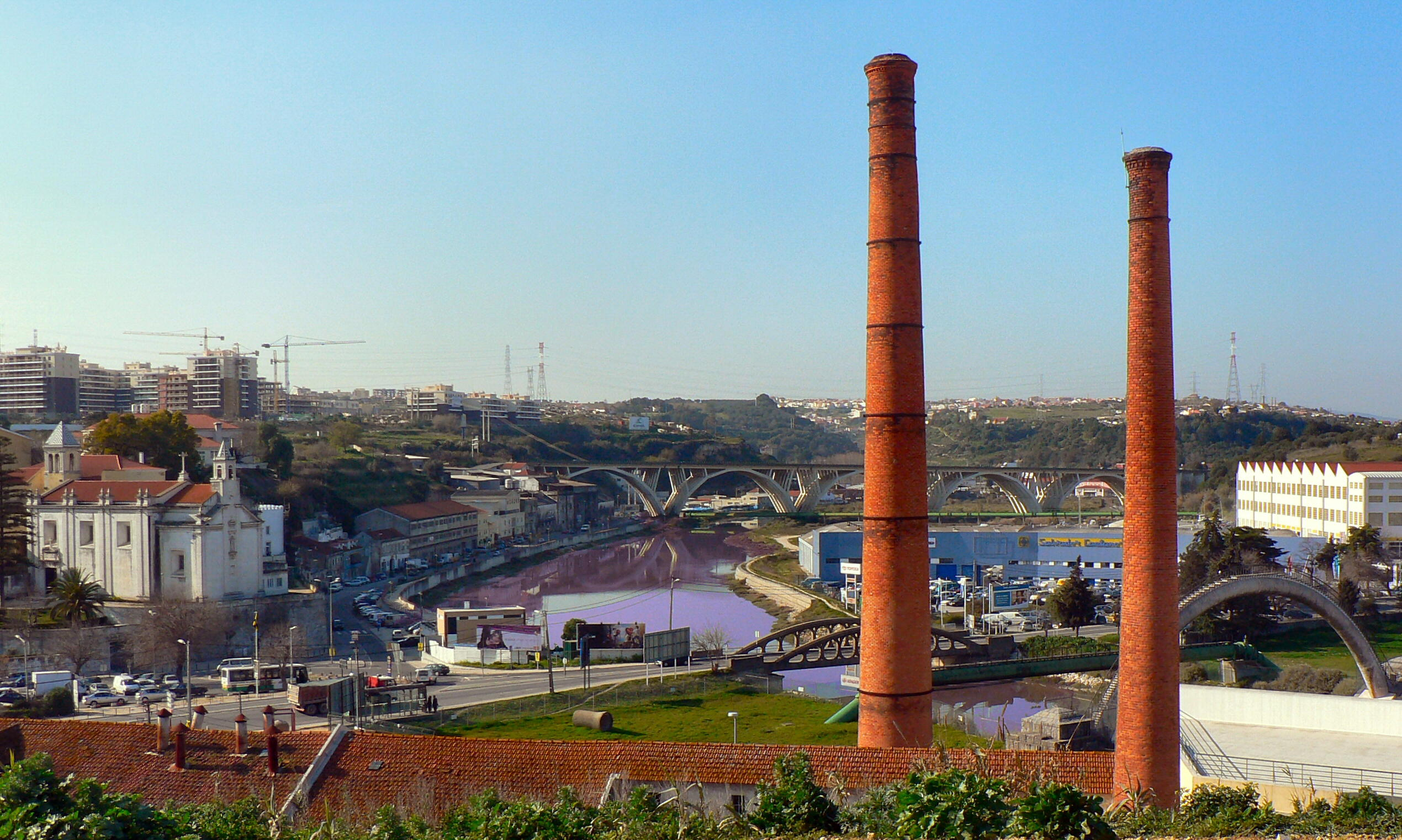

Location
- Country: Portugal

Physical characteristics
- Mouth
  - location: Tagus
- Basin size: 29.319 km^{2} (11.320 sq mi)

The Trancão River (Portuguese pronunciation: [tɾɐ̃ˈkɐ̃w]), formerly called Rio de Sacavém, is a small river in Portugal (about 29 km) from District of Lisbon. Near its mouth, this watercourse can also be called Ribeira de Sacavém ou Vala de Sacavém.
