= Maia (Ribeira Grande) =

- Civil parish
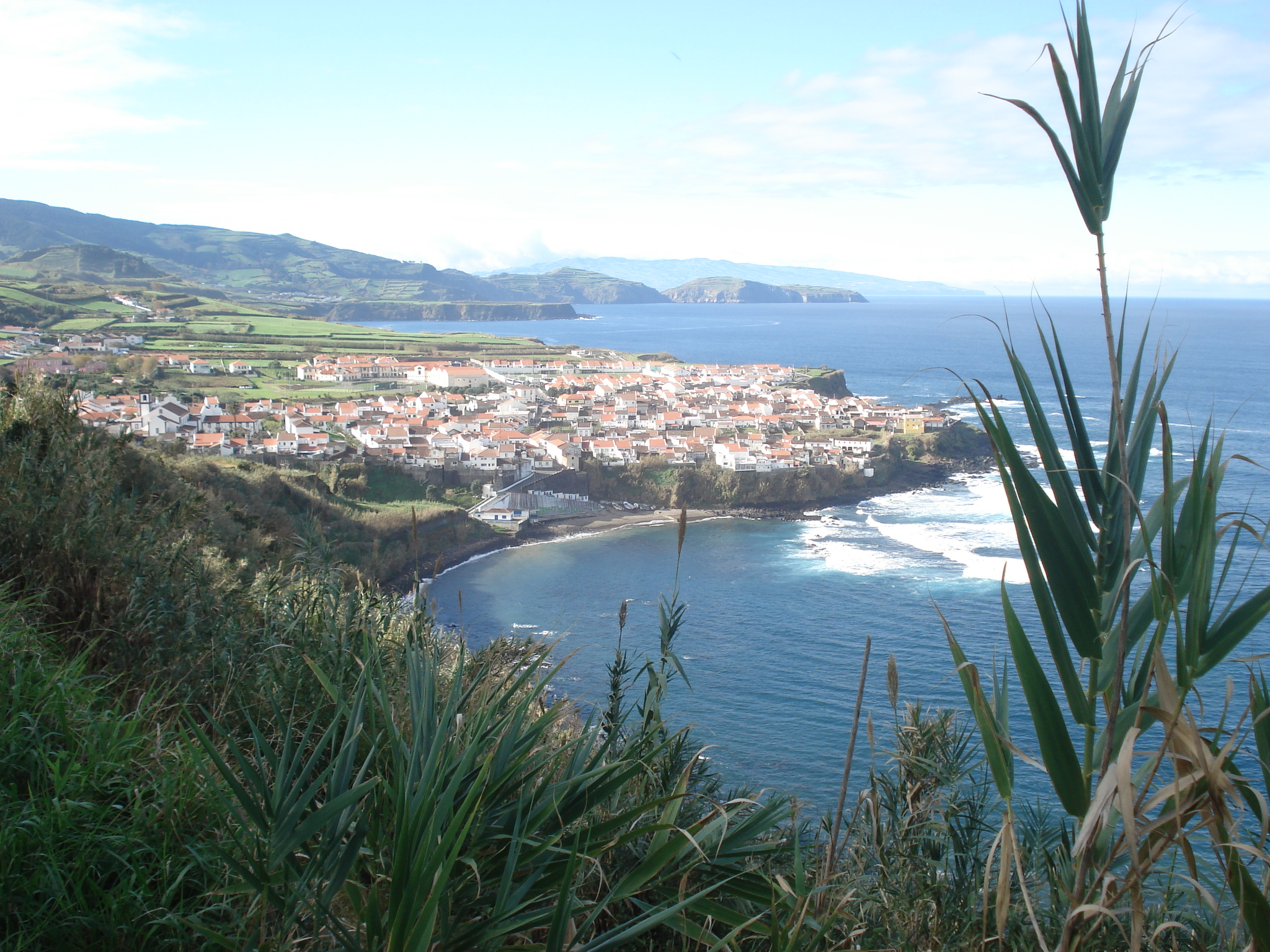
- The coastal village of Maia, as seen from the hilltop belvedere

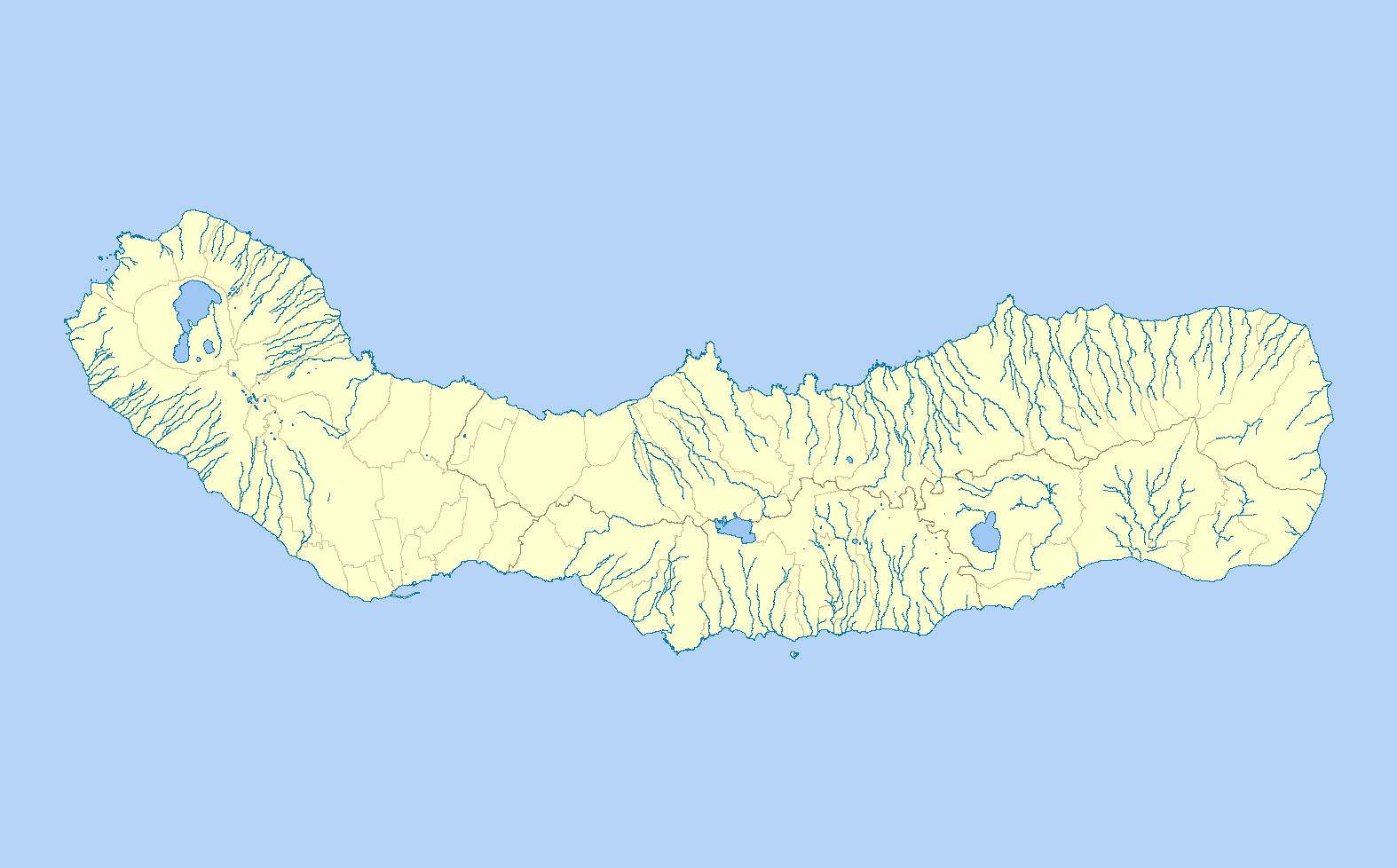
- Location in the Azores Maia (São Miguel)
- Coordinates: 37°49′57″N 25°23′18″W
- Country: Portugal
- Auton. region: Azores
- Island: São Miguel
- Municipality: Ribeira Grande

Area
  - Total: 21.97 km^{2} (8.48 sq mi)
- Elevation: 27 m (89 ft)

Population (2011)
  - Total: 1,900
  - Density: 86/km^{2} (220/sq mi)
- Time zone: UTC−01:00 (AZOT)
  - Summer (DST): UTC+00:00 (AZOST)
- Postal code: 9625-337
- Area code: 292
- Patron: Divino Espírito Santo
- Website: www.jf-maia.com

Maia is a civil parish in the municipality of Ribeira Grande in the Portuguese archipelago of the Azores. The population in 2011 was 1,900, in an area of 21.97 km². Maia is the largest parish by area in Ribeira Grande.

== History ==
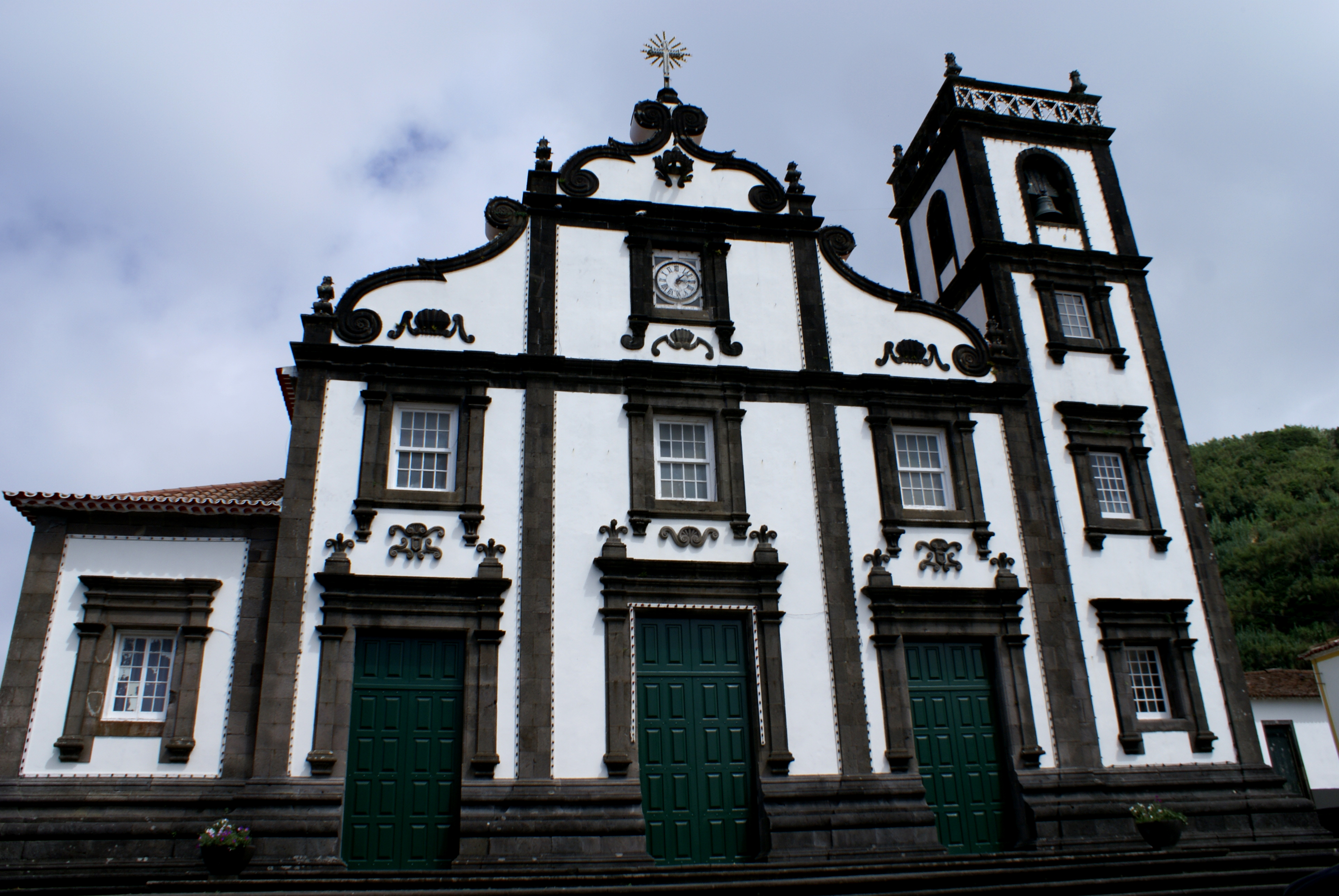
The front facade of the Church of the Divino Espírito Santo

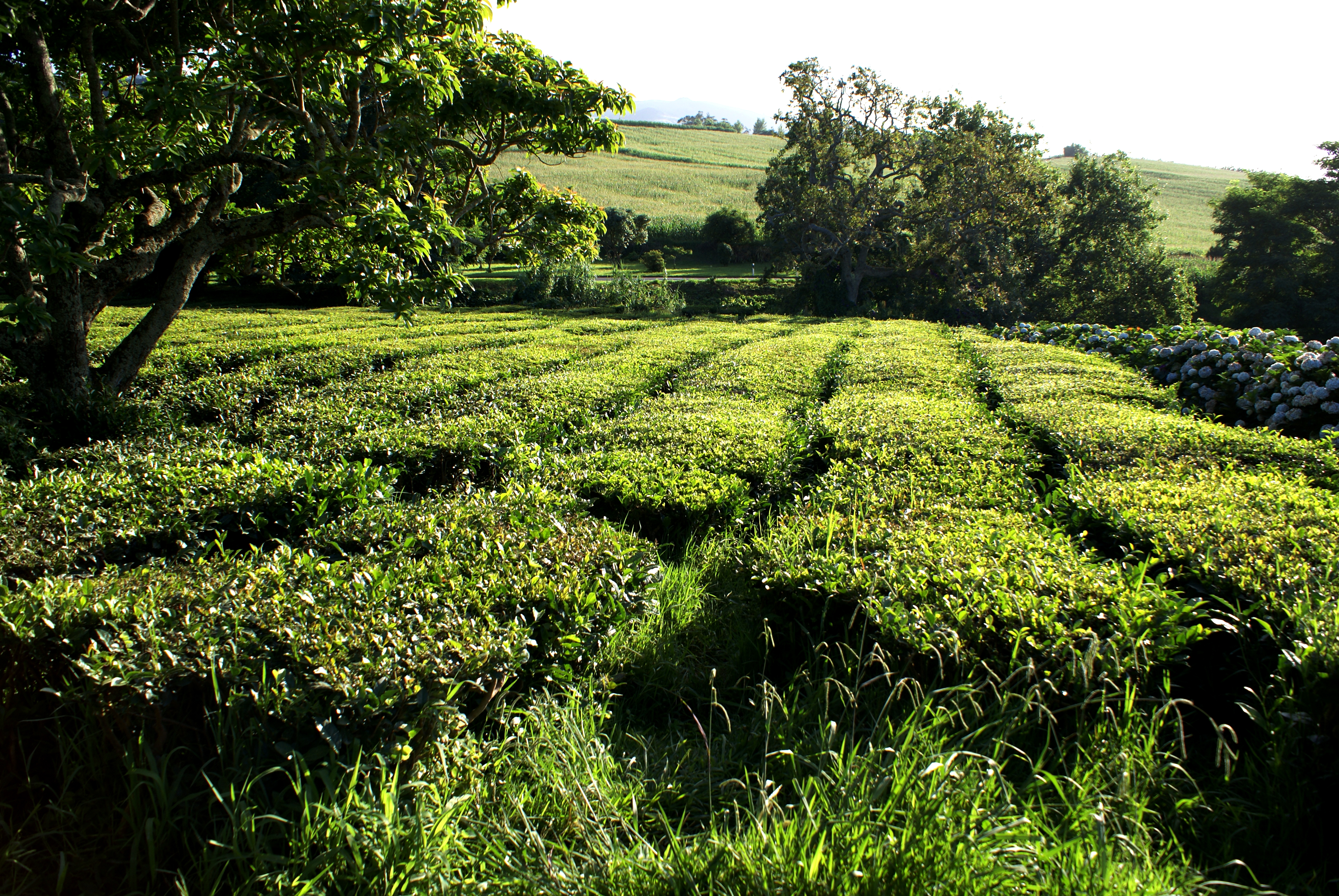
The tea fields in the foothills of Gorreana, established in the 18th century: the only European region to support tea production

The first Azorean historians referred to this parish, owing to the settlement of Inês da Maia, a noblewoman that established a home here in the 15th century.

The settlement of the community dates back to the early settlement of Ribeira Grande; the construction of the main church was begun at the end of the 15th century. By 1522, it had its third vicar. Maia became one of the northern coasts more rapidly growing places: one hundred years after its foundation it had become a civil parish. Its fertile terrains, one of the more productive on the island of São Miguel, and its port access, meant that small industry developed easily in this area. In particular, the tobacco, tea and cement industries developed over the course of the next centuries. Maia was also the location and headquarters for one of the first passenger transport companies on the island.

The parochial church was dedicated to the Holy Spirit in 1812, constructed after a 16th-century chapel, and expanded in 17th and 18th centuries. The Solar do Lalém, constructed at the end of the 19th century, with chapel and 18th-century portal.

In the area of Gorreana, thus named for the fact that the first resident was a man named Gorreana or gorro de Ana, who owned a tea plantation, a rare thing in Europe. This area is also the location of the Chapel of Nossa Senhora do Resgate (Portuguese: Ermida de Nossa Senhora do Resgate), from the 18th century, constructed with a decorative facade by the local farmers. In its interior, azulejos were assembled on the altar with a medallion and the patron saint in the same decoration.

In the area of Lombinha da Maia, named for its location on a small hill/escarpment (Portuguese: lombinha), a small chapel was constructed in 1896, to the invocation of Nossa Senhora das Dores. Later it was adapted, with a baptistery and sacristy to support the parishioners.

On 27 October 1919, a commission was installed to establish a religious Brotherhood, dedicated to the Holy Spirit of Maia (Portuguese: Santa Casa do Divino Espírito Santo da Maia) was convened. In 1943, the group erected a cornerstone for the local hospital, inaugurated on 24 September 1944. With the acquisition of the local pharmacy in 1946, the Santa Casa supported the population from Porto Formoso until Fenais da Ajuda.

The first male school was created in 1860, and later another schoolhouse dedicated to female students was established in 1877, eventually resulting in the development of the first primary school in January 1890. These schools were installed in private residences, which were later substituted by centenary schools, as part of centenary build programs at the turn of the century, opening on 1 December 1951. In 2000, Maia inaugurated a new EB2/3 secondary school to support the regional population.

== Geography ==
Maia is located along the northern coast of São Miguel, situated between the civil parishes of São Brás (in the west) and Lomba da Maia (in the east) in the municipality of Ribeira Grande, with the municipalities of Vila Franca do Campo and Povoação to the south. This southern border makes-up part of the Serra da Tronqueira, a rugged ridge that intersects the middle of the island. The parish is bisected by the Regional E.R. 1-1ª roadway running west to east, and a secondary roadway (E.R.2-1ª) running to the southern municipality.

There are several smaller nuclei within the borders of Maia, these include the main village of Maia (along the coast), Lombinha da Maia (near the border with Lomba da Maia), Calços da Maia (a stretch of road to the main roadway from the village) and Gorreana (near its western border with São Brás). The main village extends along a former debris field, a fajã, that extended from the heights of the

== Economy ==
The parish is supported economically by agriculture, fishing and auxiliary industries/commerce related to the tea plantations, tourism and hospitality services.

== Culture ==
The parish social centre promotes many of the cultural initiatives, conferences, colloquiums and events in the parish.

Religious events include the celebrations marking Senhor dos Passos, on the week Sunday of Lent, the festivals of the Holy Spirit (on the Monday of Holy Spirit), the festival of a "Blessed" (Portuguese: Festa do Santíssimo), on the second-to-last Sunday of July, and the feast of Our Lady of the Rosary (Portuguese: Festa de Nossa Senhora do Rosário), on the first Sunday of October. There are approximately 14 processions per year in the parish.

== Architecture ==
- Church of the Divine Holy Spirit (Portuguese: Igreja Paroquial de Maia/Igreja do Divino Espírito Santo), established from a 1522 chapel, it was elaborated by João Tavares, but only consecrated on 15 October 1812
