= 1980 Azores Islands earthquake =

Earthquake on Azores Islands, Portugal

1980 Azores Islands
- Location within Azores
- UTC time: 1980-01-01 16:42:42
- ISC event: 652123
- USGS-ANSS: ComCat
- Local date: 1 January 1980
- Local time: 15:42:42
- Magnitude: 6.9 M_{w}^{(ISC-GEM)}
- Depth: 10 kilometres (6 mi)
- Epicenter: 50 km west of Angra do Heroísmo; 38.81°N 27.78°W
- Type: Strike-slip
- Areas affected: Portugal; Azores
- Max. intensity: MMI VIII (Severe)–MMI IX (Violent)
- Tsunami: A small tsunami was registered in Angra do Heroismo
- Casualties: 73 dead, 400 injured

Striking the Autonomous Region of the Azores on 1 January, the 1980 Azores Island earthquake killed 73 people and injured over 400, causing severe damage on the islands of Terceira and São Jorge. Resulting from a strike slip fracture, typical of other historical Azorean earthquakes, and measuring 6.9 on the moment magnitude scale, it also shook the islands of Pico and Faial.

In response to the earthquake, Portuguese president António Ramalho Eanes announced three days of national mourning, while relief efforts, initiated by agents of the local Air Force, were soon accompanied by government-supported agencies.

== Geology ==
=== Background ===
In 1950, another strong earthquake had rocked the Azores Islands region, and this was the largest earthquake since.

=== Description ===
Volcanic in origin, the Azores lie in a tectonically complex area on either side of the Mid-Atlantic Ridge, between the European, American and African plate boundaries, forming their own microplate. The 1980 earthquake was the result of movement along a northwest to southeast trending strike-slip fault.

After aftershocks from the quake had concluded, a study took place, identifying focal solutions for these small events. The type of faulting responsible for these shocks was similar to that of previous earthquakes around the Azores. For these earthquakes, scientists had determined that the conjugate nodal plane was responsible, seeing shearing in the right-lateral (dextral) direction. All faulting in this area is strike-slip-oriented, and on a rather large scale. Because of this research, information now points towards Azores volcanism being controlled by earthquake movement.

== Damage and casualties ==
The earthquake that struck the Azorean islands was 6.9 M_{w}. It caused considerable damage on three separate islands (Terceira, São Jorge Island, and Graciosa), destroying several buildings. According to local reports, roughly 70% of the houses on Terceira were completely demolished, including the historic quarter of the island capital, Angra do Heroísmo. In general, public buildings such as churches remained intact, while several buildings caved in on themselves. Public utilities such as electricity and water, were reported cut in several areas.

Initially, the number of fatalities was set at 52. It was later revised to 61 and finally to 72. Additionally, the injuries were set at 300, but this was also revised to more than 400. At least 20,000 people were left homeless. Minor damage was recorded at Pico and Faial islands.

No fatalities were recorded at the Lajes Field air base, nor any major damage.

== Relief efforts and response ==
United States Navy and Air Force personnel stationed at Lajes functioned as disaster relief workers, sheltering as many as 150 families. Portuguese Air Force members brought supplies to earthquake victims, while a Portuguese Navy João Coutinho-class corvette transported medical officials to the island. The Portuguese president, António Ramalho Eanes, flew in on a plane accompanied by medical personnel and supplies (such as bedding). Local officials including policemen and volunteer firemen cleared roads for relief supplies and transports. Responding to the situation, these officials were also involved in looking for survivors in the rubble. Soon after, tents were erected to replace the destroyed or unsafe homes for approximately 200 families of the islands. Portable homes were constructed by the People to People International project fund, resulting in 100 shelters.

Three days of national mourning were declared by Eanes. Following the relief efforts, 19 seismographic stations were installed to monitor seismic activities. Eleven of these were used to monitor earthquake activity, while the other eight also record information on the island's geothermal areas.

The earthquake forced hundreds of people to leave the country for the United States. It occurred during a period of several major natural disasters in which many residents of the island left; in 1975, 8,000 residents left. In 1981, however, just 2,500 people left the island.

== Analysis and current situation ==
Later studies of the events leading up to the tragedy found several factors contributing to the extent of the damage. A. Malheiro (2006) linked five major causes to damage from these earthquakes. The buildings most damaged by the earthquake were near fault lines on top of loosely packed soil. They tended to be of poor construction and did not conform to proper building code, nor had they been adequately examined.

The area around the Azores remains active. Threats from earthquakes and landslides remain.

== See also ==
- List of earthquakes in 1980
- List of earthquakes in Portugal
- List of earthquakes in the Azores
