= 1522 Vila Franca earthquake =

- Location within Azores
- Local time: 22 October 1522 ~02:00
- Epicenter: 37.7°N 25.4°W
- Areas affected: São Miguel, Azores
- Max. intensity: EMS-98 X (Very destructive)
- Casualties: 4,000–5,000

The 1522 Vila Franca earthquake, also known as the 1522 Vila Franca landslide (Portuguese: Subversão de Vila Franca or Terramoto de Vila Franca) refers to the earthquake and landslides that occurred on 22 October 1522, in the municipality of Vila Franca do Campo. Vila Franca do Campo was then the provincial capital and is located on São Miguel Island in the Portuguese archipelago of the Azores.

The epicenter of the earthquake was situated several kilometres north-northwest of Vila Franca. The shaking had a maximum intensity of X (i.e., "Very destructive") on the European macroseismic scale, triggering landslides and lahars that moved 6,750,000 cubic metres (238,000,000 ft^{3}) of material down the surrounding slopes, destroying buildings. The movement of debris into the settlement caused the deaths of 3,000 to 5,000 people. In addition to the destruction of Vila Franca, the earthquake affected the neighboring settlements of Ponta Garça, Maia and Porto Formoso where thousands died as well. A tsunami formed by the lahar destroyed several boats that were located near the islet of Vila Franca and the deaths of almost a hundred people. Gaspar Frutuoso, writing 70 years following the destruction, provided a complete record of these events, called "Romance de Vila Franca."

== History ==
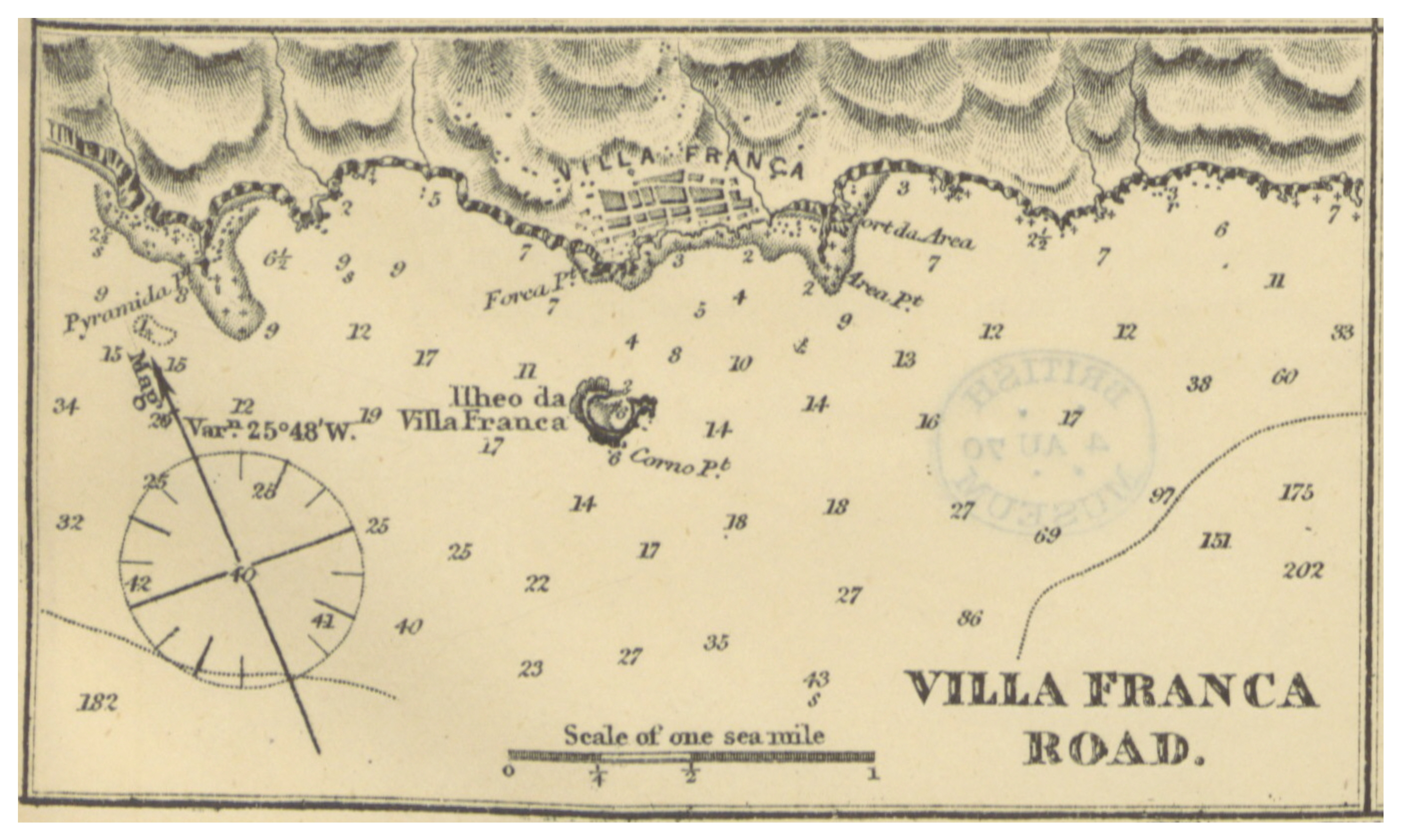
A map of Vila Franca do Campo, the former provincial capital of São Miguel

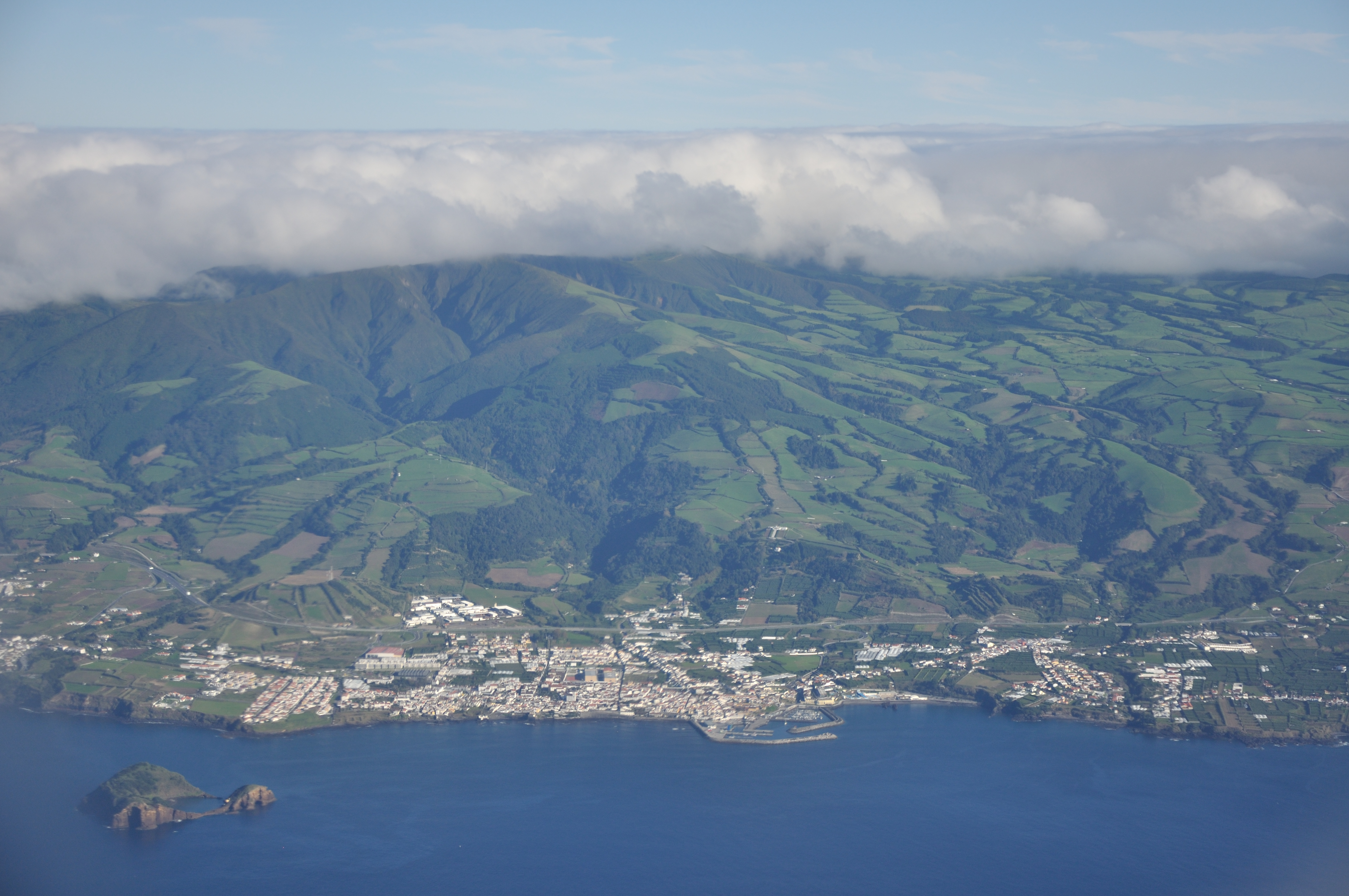
A view of the Água do Pau Massif overlooking the modern town of Vila Franca do Campo

Between the end of the 15th and beginning of the 16th century, the settlement of Vila Franca do Campo was the provincial capital of the island of São Miguel. The town was granted the status of a municipality in 1472. The principal civil and religious institutions and the residence were located there, as well as the residence of the Donatary-Captain, whose family (the Gonçalves da Câmara clan) were the most powerful on the island. They would later receive the title of Counts of Vila Franca. The presence of the main customshouse and relative shelter of the villages' islet made Vila Franca the primary port of entry to the island.

Vila Franca do Campo had never suffered an attack or natural disaster. By 1522, it was a prosperous and developing center with over 5,000 inhabitants, making up approximately 25 percent of the island's population. Most of the population settled along the coast where the mouths of the ravines of Ribeira da Mãe de Água and Ribeira Seca provided drinkable water. The interior, which extended into the Água de Pau Massif, was less populated, especially near the Rabaçal and Louriçal hilltops that were separated by the Ribeira da Mãe de Água valley. About 600 metres (2,000 ft) from the village was the islet of Vila Franca, which was a navigating landmark and provided some shelter from southern squalls.

Due to the lack of contemporary building materials, most of the buildings in the village were constructed from loose masonry stone and filled with gravel or stone. Only the homes of the landed gentry and the principal facades of the better properties were plastered with clay. The low quality of the clay on the island meant that these too were weak and easily crumpled. The difficulty of producing tile locally meant the richer nobles and religious buildings were covered in tile, while poorer homes were framed in culm and covered with hay or straw. The elevated hardness of the basalt stone made working the material difficult, creating rounded surfaces that were fragile to masonry. These factors, combined with the elevated weight of the walls, resulted in constructions that were vulnerable to seismic activity.

According to the Romance de Vila Franca, on the night of 21 October 1522:

...//Quarter of the moon was ///It was a Wednesday //Wednesday sad day //And in a night more serene //The heaven could do did //That that could run lifted //Nothing that he felt //No breadth of wind //Nor tree leaf waved //Starring night was the heaven //Clouds did not darken

The calm did not last; around two in the morning, local time, as related in the Saudades da Terra (authored by Gaspar Frutuoso):

...with a starry night and clear, without a cloud in the sky, there was heard in all the island a grandioso and spontaneous tremor of the earth, that lasted for the space of creed, that appeared that the elements, fire, air and water, fought at the centre, making them great concussions, with snorting and horrendous movements, like raging sea waves, appearing to all inhabitants of the island that turned to center, as if the sky was falling. And finishing in the space of the Creed or Our Father and Ave Maria all or more, it began again to shake softly as much.

Aftershocks continued until midday on 22 October.

The epicenter of the earthquake is estimated to have been some kilometers north-northwest of the town, in the area of Monte Escuro. It culminated in a scale X event. Landslides followed throughout the island. It is likely that they were affected by the saturation of the sub-soil from by torrential rainfall several days earlier. The island's volcanic terrain, consisting of low-density pyroclastic materials (such as the pumice stones that comprised the flanks of the Água do Pau Massif), was susceptible to landslides, and eventually resulted in the creation of lahars. Similar conditions on the northeast coast of Faialense Caldera occurred during the July 1998 earthquake.

Gaspar Frutuoso continued, noting how the great landslides were terrifying:

...there was no grotto, from the south to the northeast, that did not run with ravines of mud.

Multiple landslides all over the island followed, especially in Maia, where a gigantic avalanche of mud descended along the flanks of Monte Rabaçal, followed the course of the Ribeira da Mãe de Água and later spread over the whole town. As Gaspar Frutuoso noted:

...the ravine to the east, where the town was, everything was devastated and the inhabitants all almost dead. Only from the same ravine to the west, escape a few houses, a majority of those fells, where remained alive only 70 people more or less, of those they began to cry greatly, calling to God and others to the Virgin Mary...'

The mud arrived at the port and fell to the sea. Some people were swept along with it. It also caused a tsunami that destroyed ships that were anchored in the bay. As Gaspar Frutuoso indicated:

...there were in the port then four or five boats sheltered in the islet for departure to Portugal, which caused the death of more people there where they gathered there to make the voyage.

A study of the resulting deposits from the 1522 landslides permitted an analysis of the material that spread across Vila Franca from the headlands of the Ribeira da Mãe d’Água in the northwest and south of the Pico da Cruz, from Monte Rabaçal. Breaking from an area along the south-southeast flank, up to 6,750,000 cubic metres (238,000,000 ft^{3}) of debris ran down the ravine, at a speed that was estimated at between 1–3 metres per second (3.3–9.8 ft/s), reaching the centre of the village in a few minutes and covering it completely. The dense current of material razed the remaining buildings and carried many of the Vilafranquenses to the sea. Another torrent of less magnitude, generated in the headlands of the Ribeira Seca, followed the ravine and spread across the eastern coast, in the area of the parish of Ribeira Seca.

== Aftermath ==
The consequences were tragic: between 3000 and 5000 people were killed in the village, many due to the landslides and lahars that followed the watercourses. Much of the central part of the town was covered in mud and landslide material, with the port disappearing under a layer of pumice. As Gaspar Frutuoso concluded:

...and in the light of day, they collected a few people that lived from the mounts and the farms, and those that remained alive in the outskirts, all scared from the great tremors and sounds that they heard; and seeing the town in the state it was found, were astounded. Many people from all the island had their homes, parents, friends and families, sent each to dig where they stood, some to take out their dead bodies, others to find money and implements they had in their homes, others to do the same for the bodies and belongings of their parents and families. And that way they dug in many parts of the town, some found bodies along roads and others in their homes or margins, between which they found some alive.

He concluded:

...In one tragic night, many lives were ended and everything became covered, of which no noble had houses, nor high buildings, nor sumptuous temples, nor nobles or simple people throughout the morning appeared, becoming everything flat and ground, without a sign or sight of where the town had been.

The catastrophe became known as the subversion of Vila Franca or burial of Vila Franca, and marked a profound change in the development of the island of São Miguel. It resulted in the economic, social and political migration of settlers from the municipality of Vila Franca and the growth of the city of Ponta Delgada, then an economic rival in the region.
