= Lisbon earthquake =

Lisbon earthquake may refer to:

- 1321 Lisbon earthquake
- 1356 Lisbon earthquake
- 1531 Lisbon earthquake
- 1755 Lisbon earthquake, also known as the Great Lisbon earthquake
- 1761 Lisbon earthquake

== See also ==
- 1909 Benavente earthquake
