= 1356 Lisbon earthquake =

Earthquake that affected Lisbon, Portugal

- Local date: 24 August 1356
- Magnitude: 8.5 (est.)
- Epicenter: 36°30′N 10°0′W
- Areas affected: Portugal

The 1356 Lisbon earthquake was a very high magnitude earthquake that struck the Lisbon area and beyond late in the day on Wednesday, 24 August 1356, Saint Bartholomew's Day. It lasted a quarter of an hour and destroyed several buildings, including the city's four bread ovens. Aftershocks were felt for a year.

The earthquake probably originated in the Gorringe Ridge, off Cape St. Vincent. It is mentioned, for example, in the Livro da Noa, which belonged to the library of the Monastery of the Holy Cross in Coimbra, in the Livro das Lembranças, in the Crónica de D. Pedro I de Castela, and in the Chancelaria de D. Pedro I. The event was largely forgotten until, in the 21st century, an inscription about the earthquake was found on the wall of the Torre do Paço, in the São Jorge Castle.

== See also ==
- 1356 Basel earthquake
- 1531 Lisbon earthquake
- 1722 Algarve earthquake
- 1755 Lisbon earthquake
- 1761 Portugal earthquake
- Azores–Gibraltar Transform Fault
- List of earthquakes in Portugal
- List of historical earthquakes
