= Briankle Chang =

Briankle G. Chang (born 1954) is an American writer, translator, and academic. He was born and raised in Taiwan and did his postgraduate study in the United States. He works primarily in the areas of philosophy of communication, media theory and criticism, and cultural studies. He is considered the first scholar to bring to bear the ideas of Jacques Derrida on the field of communication studies and media studies. In his book, Deconstructing Communication: Representation, Subject, and Economies of Exchange (1996), he demonstrates the limits of phenomenology by showing how it fails to address the question of intersubjectivity and proposes a la Derrida the idea of “postal principle” as fundamental to any theory of communication and mediation. This idea is elaborated in his subsequent writings and forms the perspective behind much of his works after Deconstructing Communication. For the past 15 years, he has been a faculty member in the Department of Communication, University of Massachusetts, Amherst, where he teaches in the areas of cultural studies and philosophy of communication.

Chang writes in both English and Chinese, and some of his essays in English have been translated into Chinese and other languages. He has published in journals such as International Philosophical Quarterly, British Journal of Aesthetics, History of European Ideas, Cultural Critique, differences, Cultural Studies, and others. He is the Chinese translator of Jacques Derrida’s Monolinguisme de l’autre: ou la prothèse d’origin, and he has translated writings by other French theorists into English. While continuing his engagements with writers such as Derrida, Jean Luc Nancy, Jean-Luc Marion, and others, his recent works are influenced visibly by the writings of Werner Hamacher. He recently co-edited an anthology on the philosophy of communication for the MIT Press (2012), which was named Best Edited Book by the Philosophy of Communication Division of the National Communication Association.

== Publications ==
=== Books ===
- Deconstructing Communication: Representation, Subject, and Economies of Exchange, Minneapolis: University of Minnesota Press, 1996.
- Philosophy of Communication, Cambridge, MA: MIT Press, 2012.
- Thinking Media and Beyond: Perspectives from German Media Theory, New York, NY: Routledge, 2017.

=== Translations ===
- Le monolinguisme de l'autre, ou, La prothese d'origine (Monolingualism of the Other: or, The Prosthesis of Origin), Jacques Derrida, (translation into Chinese), 2000.
