= List of earthquakes in Portugal =

This list documents major earthquakes affecting Portugal.

Date	Location	Mag.	MMI	Notes	Casualties		Ref
Date	Location	Mag.	MMI	Notes	Dead	Injured	Ref
210 BCE	Cape St. Vincent			Possible tsunami.			
60 BCE	coasts of Portugal and Galicia	8.5	IX	Tsunami			
382	Cape St. Vincent	7.5		Tsunami			
1344	Lisbon						
1356-08-24	Lisbon		X	Severe damage in Seville and Lisbon.			
1531-01-26	Lisbon	7.7		At least 1,500 houses destroyed. Violent earthquake felt in Africa. A large tsunami was reported.	30,000		
1551-01-28	Lisbon			About 200 houses destroyed.	2,000		
1587-11	Loulé		X		170		
1597-07-28	Monte Santo		IX				
1722-12-27	Tavira, Algarve	7.8	X	At least 27 homes collapsed in Tavira. Albufeira, Loule, Lagoa, and Faro also reported damage.			
1755-11-01	Atlantic Ocean	8.7–9.0 M_{w}	XI	Lisbon almost completely destroyed by the earthquake and subsequent conflagrations. A large tsunami with a maximum height of 18.3 meters. Deaths were also reported in Morocco due to the tsunami. In the Lesser Antillies, surges were also observed.	50,000–100,000		
1756-03-29	Lisbon						
1761-03-31	Atlantic Ocean	8.5 M_{w}	IX	Lasted five minutes.			
1816-02-02	North Atlantic	8.3–8.9 M_{w}	VII	Damage and deaths in Ovar. One death in Lisbon. Felt in Spain, the Netherlands and Azores Islands.	13+		
1858-11-11	Setubal	7.1 M_{w}	X	605 homes destroyed.	6		
1909-04-23	Santarem District	6.0 M_{w}	X	Salvaterra de Magos and Benavente partially destroyed.	60		
1969-02-28	Gulf of Cádiz	7.8 M_{w}	VII	Deaths in Morocco, Portugal, and Spain. Tsunami observed.	25	80	
Note: The inclusion criteria for adding events are based on WikiProject Earthquakes' notability guideline that was developed for stand alone articles. The principles described also apply to lists. In summary, only damaging, injurious, or deadly events should be recorded.

== See also ==
- List of earthquakes in the Azores
