= 1755 Lisbon earthquake =

Catastrophic earthquake that primarily affected Lisbon, Portugal

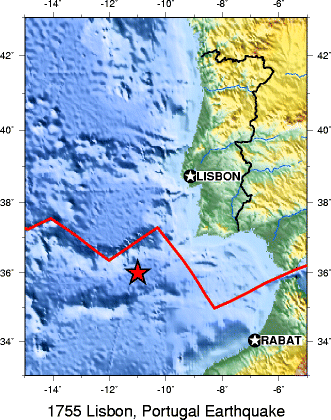

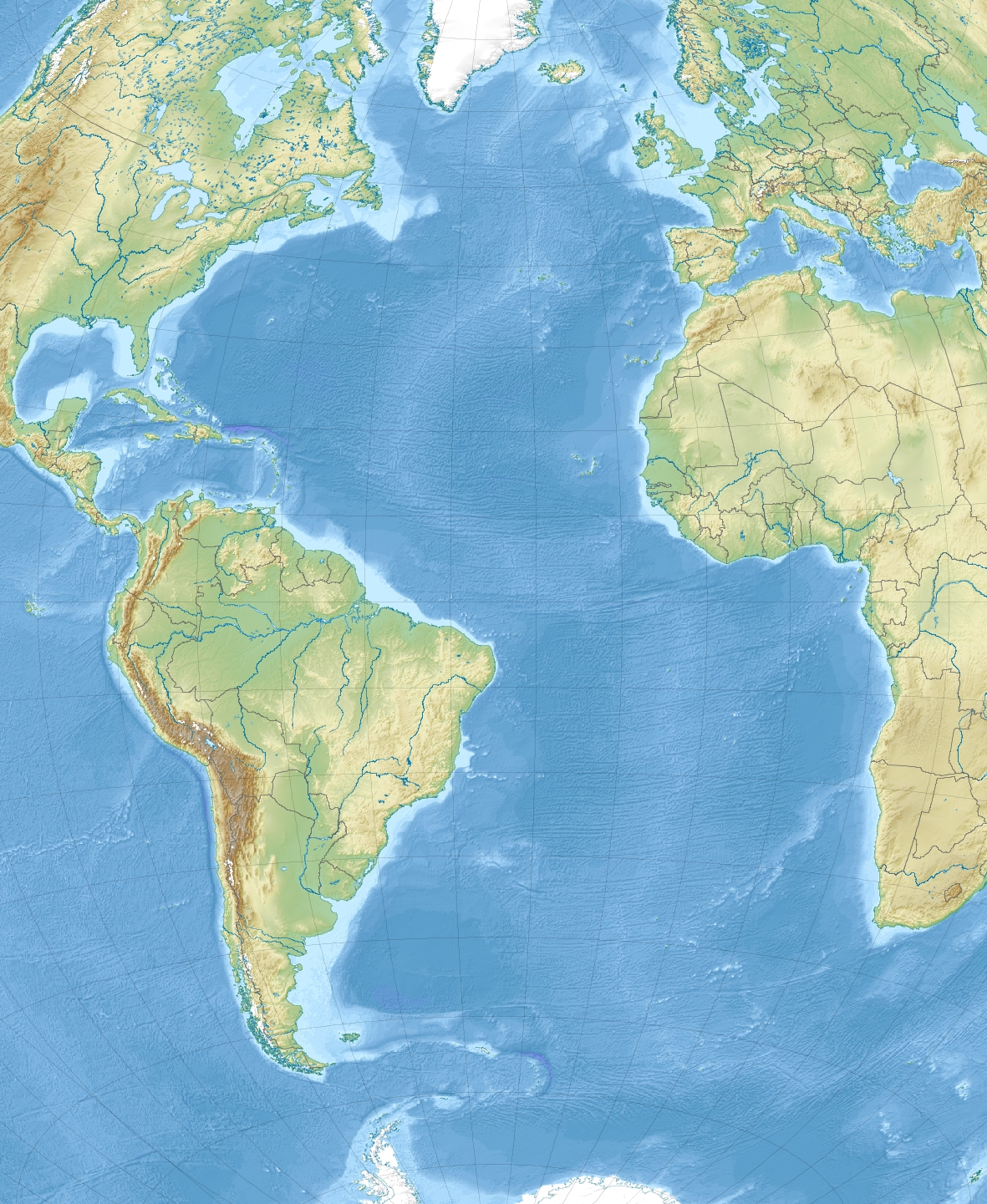
- Location within Atlantic Ocean
- Local date: 1 November 1755
- Local time: 09:40
- Magnitude: 7.7–9.0 M_{w} (est.)
- Epicenter: 36°N 11°W; About 200 km (110 nmi; 120 mi) west-southwest of Cape St. Vincent and about 290 km (160 nmi; 180 mi) southwest of Lisbon
- Fault: Azores–Gibraltar Transform Fault
- Areas affected: Portugal, Spain, and Morocco. The tsunami affected southern Great Britain and Ireland
- Max. intensity: MMI XI (Extreme)
- Casualties: 40,000–50,000 deaths

The 1755 Lisbon earthquake, also known as the Great Lisbon earthquake, occurred in the Iberian Peninsula and Northwest Africa area on the morning of Saturday, 1 November, 1755 (on the Christian Feast of All Saints); it took place at approximately 09:40 local time. In combination with subsequent fires and a tsunami, the earthquake almost completely destroyed Lisbon and adjoining areas. Seismologists estimate the Lisbon earthquake had a magnitude of 7.7 or greater on the moment magnitude scale, with its epicenter in the Atlantic Ocean about 200 km (110 nmi; 120 mi) west-southwest of Cape St. Vincent, a cape in the Algarve region, and about 290 km (160 nmi; 180 mi) southwest of Lisbon.

Chronologically, it was the third known large-scale earthquake to hit the city (following those of 1356 and 1531). Estimates place the death toll in Lisbon around 30,000–40,000. A further 10,000 may have died in Morocco.

The earthquake accentuated political tensions in Portugal and profoundly disrupted the Portuguese Empire. The event was widely discussed and dwelt upon by European Enlightenment philosophers, and inspired major developments in theodicy. As the first earthquake studied scientifically for its effects over a large area, it led to the birth of modern seismology and earthquake engineering.

== Earthquake and tsunami ==
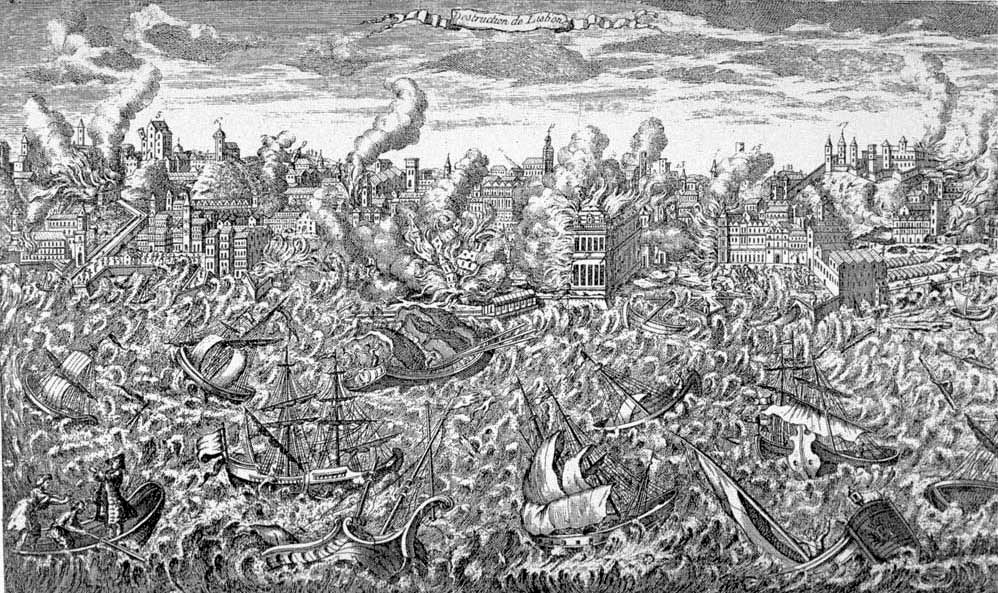
1755 copper engraving showing Lisbon in flames and a tsunami overwhelming the ships in the harbor

The earthquake struck on the morning of 1 November 1755, All Saints' Day. Contemporary reports state that the earthquake lasted from three and a half to six minutes, causing fissures 5 metres (16 ft) wide in the city center. Survivors rushed to the open space of the docks for safety and watched as the sea receded, revealing a plain of mud littered with lost cargo and shipwrecks. Approximately 40 minutes after the earthquake, a tsunami engulfed the harbor and downtown area, rushing up the Tagus river "so fast that several people riding on horseback ... were forced to gallop as fast as possible to the upper grounds for fear of being carried away." It was followed by two more waves. Candles lit in homes and churches all around the city for All Saints' Day were knocked over, starting a fire that developed into a firestorm which burned for hours in the city, asphyxiating people up to 30 metres (98 ft) from the blaze.

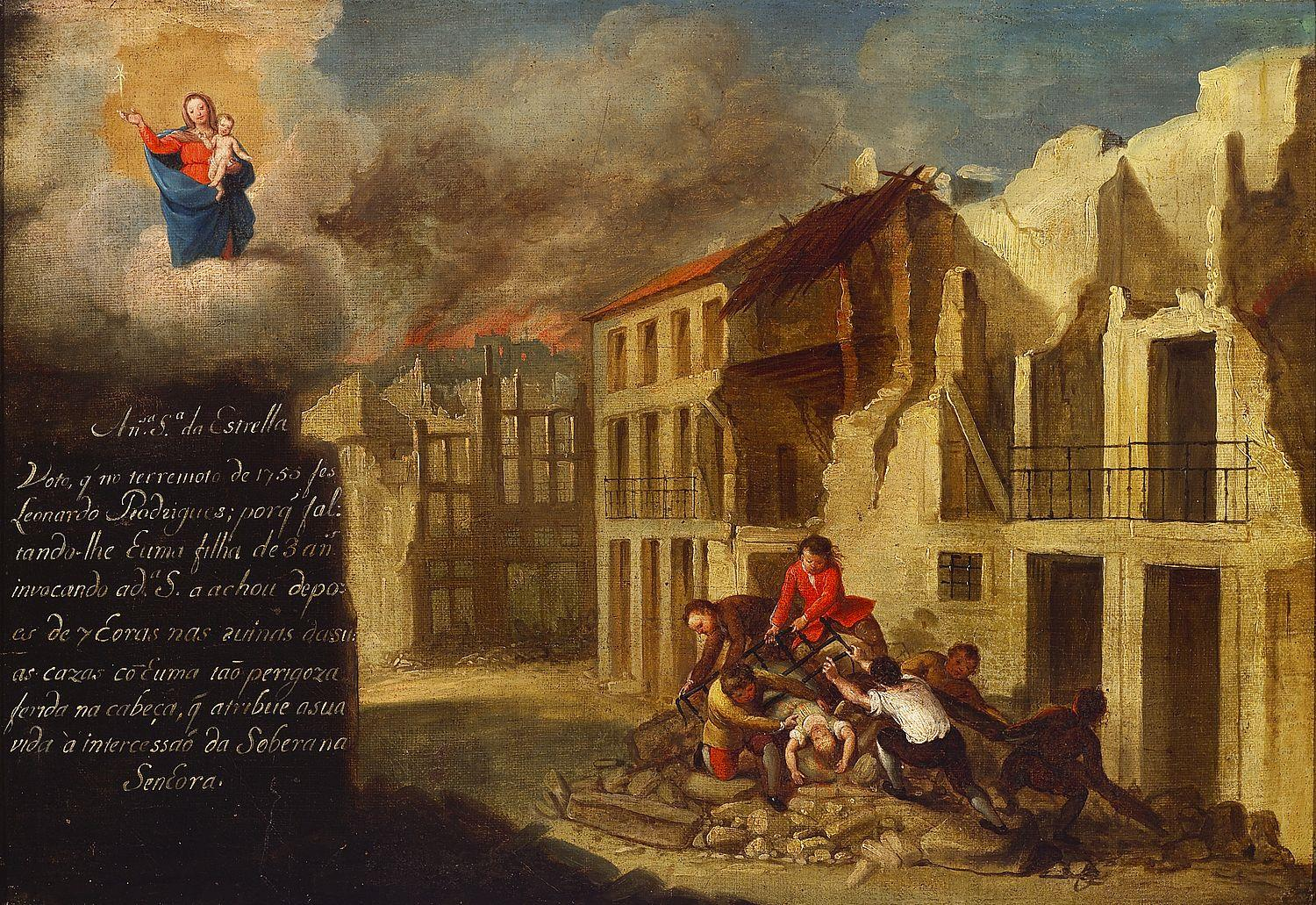
A contemporary ex-voto depicts the rescue of a three-year-old from under fallen masonry, under the watchful gaze of Our Lady of the Star

Lisbon was not the only Portuguese city affected by the catastrophe. Throughout the south of the country, in particular the Algarve, destruction was widespread. The tsunami destroyed some coastal fortresses in the Algarve and, at lower levels, it razed several houses. Almost all the coastal towns and villages of the Algarve were heavily damaged, except Faro, which was protected by the sandy banks of Ria Formosa. In Lagos, the waves reached the top of the city walls. Other towns in different Portuguese regions, such as Peniche, Cascais, Setúbal and even Covilhã (which is located near the Serra da Estrela mountain range in central inland Portugal) were visibly affected by the earthquake, the tsunami, or both. The shock waves of the earthquake destroyed part of Covilhã's castle walls and its large towers and damaged several other buildings in Cova da Beira, as well as in Salamanca, Spain. In Setúbal, parts of the Fort of São Filipe de Setúbal were damaged.

On the island of Madeira, Funchal and many smaller settlements suffered significant damage. Almost all of the ports in the Azores archipelago suffered most of their destruction from the tsunami, with the sea penetrating about 150 metres (490 ft) inland. Current and former Portuguese towns in northern Africa were also affected by the earthquake. Places such as Ceuta (ceded by Portugal to Spain in 1668) and Mazagon, where the tsunami hit the coastal fortifications of both towns hard, in some cases going over them and flooding the harbor area. In Spain, the tsunamis swept the Andalusian Atlantic Coast, damaging the city of Cadiz.

2016 animation from NOAA

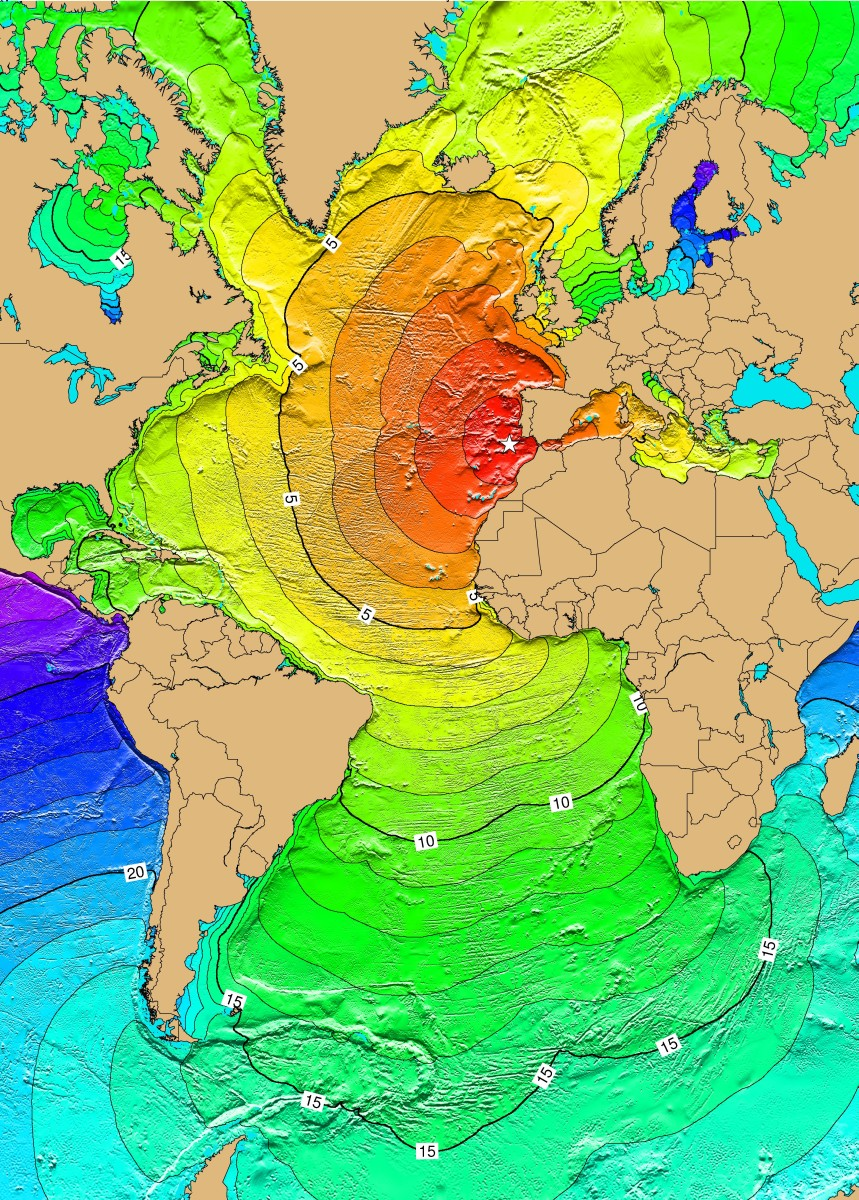
Calculated travel times (in hours) for the tsunami waves of 1 November 1755

Shocks from the earthquake were felt throughout Europe as far as Finland and in North Africa, and according to some sources even in Greenland and the Caribbean. Tsunamis as tall as 20 metres (66 ft) swept along the coast of North Africa, and struck Martinique and Barbados across the Atlantic Ocean. A three-metre (ten-foot) tsunami hit Cornwall on the southern British coast. Galway, on the west coast of Ireland, was also hit, resulting in partial destruction of the "Spanish Arch" section of the city wall. In County Clare, Aughinish Island was created when a low-lying connection to the mainland was washed away. At Kinsale, several vessels were whirled round in the harbor, and water poured into the marketplace.

In 2015, it was determined that the tsunami waves reached the coast of Brazil, then a colony of Portugal. Letters sent by Brazilian authorities at the time of the earthquake describe damage and destruction caused by gigantic waves.

Although seismologists and geologists have always agreed that the epicenter was in the Atlantic to the west of the Iberian Peninsula, its exact location has been a subject of considerable debate. Early hypotheses had proposed the Gorringe Ridge, about 320 km (170 nmi; 200 mi) south-west of Lisbon, until simulations showed that a location closer to the shore of Portugal was required to accord with the observed effects of the tsunami. A 1992 seismic reflection survey of the ocean floor along the Azores–Gibraltar Transform Fault detected a 50-kilometre-long (31 mi) thrust fault southwest of Cape St. Vincent, with a dip-slip throw of more than 1 km (0.62 mi). This structure may have created the primary tectonic event.

== Casualties and damage ==
The ruins of the Carmo Convent, which was destroyed in the Lisbon earthquake

Economic historian Álvaro Pereira estimated that of Lisbon's population at the time of approximately 200,000 people, 30,000–40,000 were killed. Another 10,000 may have died in Morocco. A 2009 study of contemporary reports relating to the 1 November event found them vague and difficult to separate from reports of another local series of earthquakes on 18–19 November. Pereira estimated the total death toll in Portugal, Spain and Morocco from the earthquake and the resulting fires and tsunami at 40,000 to 50,000 people.

85% of Lisbon's buildings were destroyed, including famous palaces and libraries, as well as most examples of Portugal's distinctive 16th-century Manueline architecture. Several buildings that had suffered little earthquake damage were destroyed by the subsequent fire. The new Lisbon opera house (the "Ópera do Tejo"), opened seven months before, burned to the ground. The Royal Ribeira Palace, which stood just beside the Tagus river in the modern square Praça do Comércio, was destroyed by the earthquake and tsunami. Inside, the 70,000-volume royal library as well as hundreds of works of art, including paintings by Titian, Rubens, and Correggio, were lost. The royal archives disappeared together with detailed historical records of explorations by Vasco da Gama and other early navigators. The palace of Henrique de Meneses, 3rd Marquis of Louriçal, which housed 18,000 books, was also destroyed. The earthquake damaged several major churches in Lisbon, namely Lisbon Cathedral, St Paul's Cathedral, Santa Catarina, São Vicente de Fora, and the Church of Nossa Senhora da Conceição Velha. The Royal Hospital of All Saints (the largest public hospital at the time) in the Rossio square was consumed by fire and hundreds of patients burned to death. The tomb of national hero Nuno Álvares Pereira was also lost. Visitors to Lisbon may still walk the ruins of the Carmo Convent, which were preserved to remind Lisboners of the destruction. Most of the documentation of the 1722 Algarve earthquake sent to Lisbon for archiving became lost after the fire that followed the 1755 earthquake.

== Relief and reconstruction efforts ==
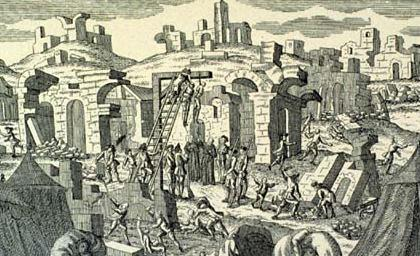
Executions in the aftermath of the Lisbon earthquake. At least 34 looters were hanged in the chaotic aftermath of the disaster. As a warning against looting, King Joseph I ordered gallows to be constructed in several parts of the city.

The royal family escaped unharmed from the catastrophe: King Joseph I and the court had left the city, after attending Mass at sunrise, fulfilling the wish of one of the king's daughters to spend the holiday away from Lisbon. After the catastrophe, Joseph I developed a fear of living within walls, and the court was accommodated in a huge complex of tents and pavilions in the hills of Ajuda, then on the outskirts of Lisbon. The king's claustrophobia never waned, and it was only after Joseph's death that his daughter Queen Maria I began building the royal Palace of Ajuda, which still stands on the site of the old tented camp. Like the king, the prime minister, the 1st Marquis of Pombal, survived the earthquake. When asked what was to be done, Pombal reportedly replied, "Bury the dead and heal the living", and set about organizing relief and rehabilitation efforts. Firefighters were sent to extinguish the raging flames, and teams of workers and ordinary citizens were ordered to remove the thousands of corpses before disease could spread. Contrary to custom and against the wishes of the Church, many corpses were loaded onto barges and buried at sea beyond the mouth of the Tagus. To prevent disorder in the ruined city, the Portuguese Army was deployed and gallows were constructed at high points around the city to deter looters; more than thirty people were publicly executed. The army prevented many able-bodied citizens from fleeing, pressing them into relief and reconstruction work.

A project proposed that a new royal palace be built in Campo de Ourique as the new royal residence in 1760, but was later abandoned due to a lack of priority or interest in a palace being built in the Campo de Ourique neighborhood of Lisbon.

The king and the prime minister immediately launched efforts to rebuild the city. On 4 December 1755, a little more than a month after the earthquake, Manuel da Maia, chief engineer to the realm, presented his plans for the rebuilding of Lisbon. Maia presented four options, from abandoning Lisbon to building a completely new city. The first and cheapest plan was to rebuild the old city using recycled materials. The second and third plans proposed widening certain streets. The fourth option boldly proposed razing the entire Baixa quarter and "laying out new streets without restraint". This last option was chosen by the king and his minister.

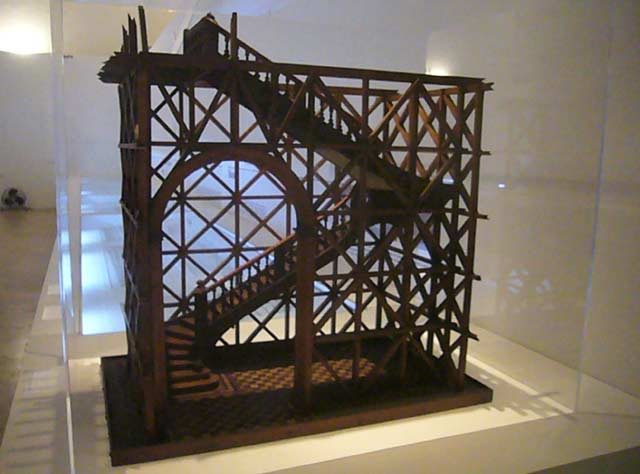
Model of the seismically protective wooden structure called "gaiola pombalina" (pombaline cage), developed for the reconstruction of Pombaline Lower Town

In less than a year, the city was cleared of debris. Keen to have a new and perfectly ordered city, the king commissioned the construction of big squares, rectilinear, large avenues and widened streets – the new mottos of Lisbon.

The Pombaline buildings are among the earliest seismically protected constructions in Europe. Small wooden models were built for testing, and earthquakes were simulated by marching troops around them. Lisbon's "new" Lower Town, known today as the Pombaline Lower Town (Baixa Pombalina), is one of the city's famed attractions. Sections of other Portuguese cities, such as the Vila Real de Santo António in Algarve, were also rebuilt along Pombaline principles.

The Casa Pia, a Portuguese institution founded by Maria I (known as A Pia, "Maria the Pious"), and organized by Police Intendant Pina Manique in 1780, was founded following the social disarray of the 1755 Lisbon earthquake. The purpose of the institution was to provide shelter and schooling to children in need.

== Effect on society, economy, and philosophy ==
The earthquake had wide-ranging effects on the lives of the populace and intelligentsia. The earthquake had struck on an important religious holiday and had destroyed almost every important church in the city, causing anxiety and confusion amongst the citizens of a staunch and devout Roman Catholic country. Theologians and philosophers focused on and speculated about the religious cause and message, seeing the earthquake as a manifestation of divine judgment.

=== Economy ===
A 2009 study estimated that the earthquake cost between 32-48% of Portugal's GDP. Also, "in spite of strict controls, prices and wages remained volatile in the years after the tragedy. The recovery from the earthquake also led to a rise in the wage premium of construction workers. More significantly, the earthquake became an opportunity to reform the economy and to reduce the economic semi-dependency vis-à-vis Britain."

=== Philosophy ===
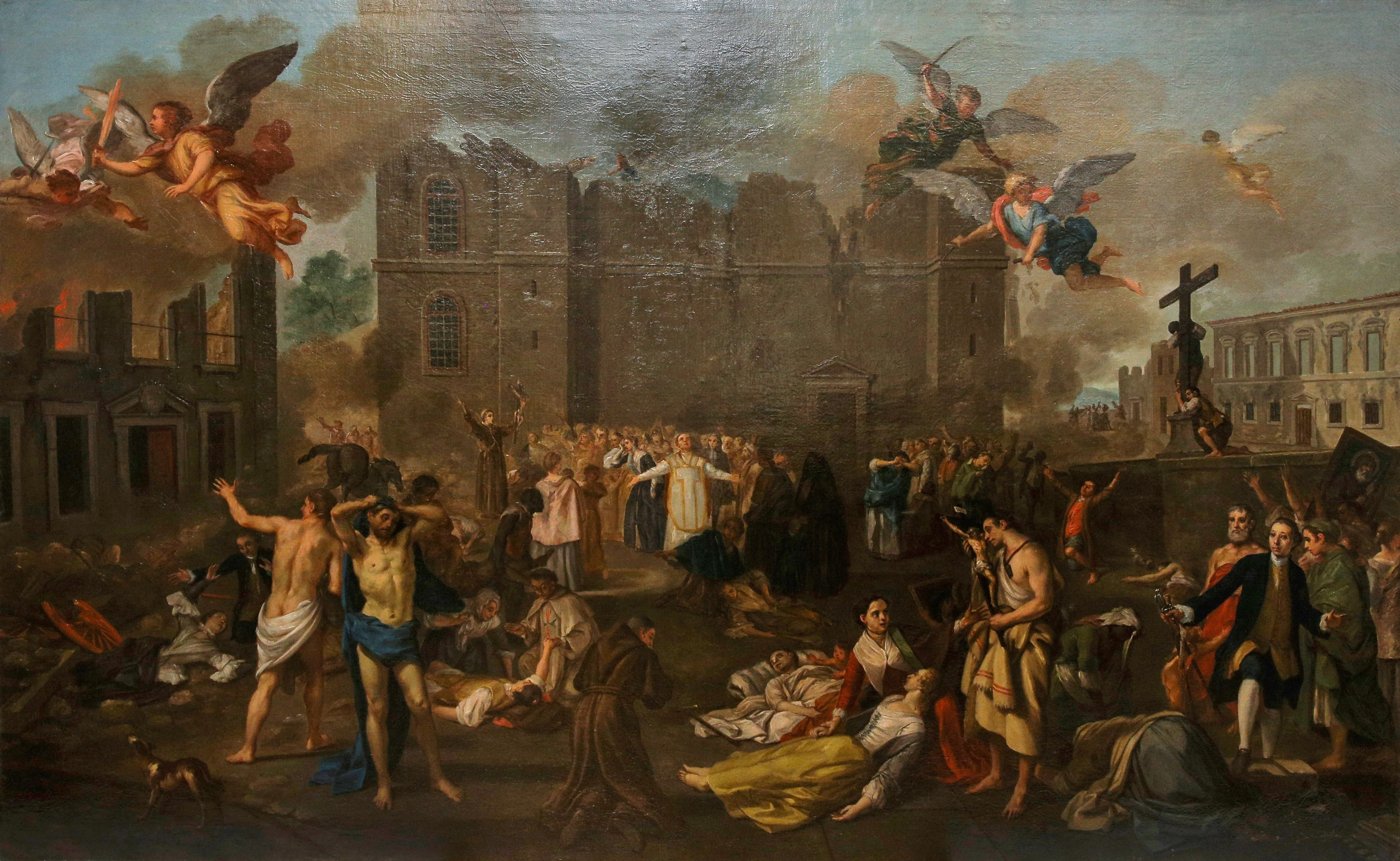
Allegory of the 1755 Earthquake, by João Glama Ströberle (who depicted himself standing on a pile of rubble on the lower-right corner). In the upper-left corner is an angel holding a fiery sword, personifying divine judgement.

The earthquake and its aftermath strongly influenced the intelligentsia of the European Age of Enlightenment. The noted writer-philosopher Voltaire used the earthquake in Candide and in his Poème sur le désastre de Lisbonne ("Poem on the Lisbon disaster"). Voltaire's Candide attacks the notion that all is for the best in this, "the best of all possible worlds", a world closely supervised by a benevolent deity. The Lisbon disaster provided a counterexample for Voltaire. Theodor W. Adorno wrote, "The earthquake of Lisbon sufficed to cure Voltaire of the theodicy of Leibniz" (Negative Dialectics 361). Jean-Jacques Rousseau was also influenced by the devastation following the earthquake, the severity of which he believed was due to too many people living within the close quarters of the city. Rousseau used the earthquake as an argument against cities as part of his desire for a more naturalistic way of life.

Immanuel Kant published three separate texts in 1756 on the Lisbon earthquake. As a younger man, fascinated with the earthquake, he collected all the information available in news pamphlets and formulated a theory of the causes of earthquakes. Kant's theory, which involved shifts in huge caverns filled with hot gases, though inaccurate, was one of the first systematic attempts to explain earthquakes in natural rather than supernatural terms.

Werner Hamacher has claimed that the consequences of the earthquake extended into the vocabulary of philosophy, making the common metaphor of firm "grounding" for philosophers' arguments shaky and uncertain: "Under the impression exerted by the Lisbon earthquake, which touched the European mind in one [of] its more sensitive epochs, the metaphor of ground and tremor completely lost their apparent innocence; they were no longer merely figures of speech" (263). Hamacher claims that the foundational certainty of René Descartes' philosophy began to shake following the Lisbon earthquake.

=== Politics ===
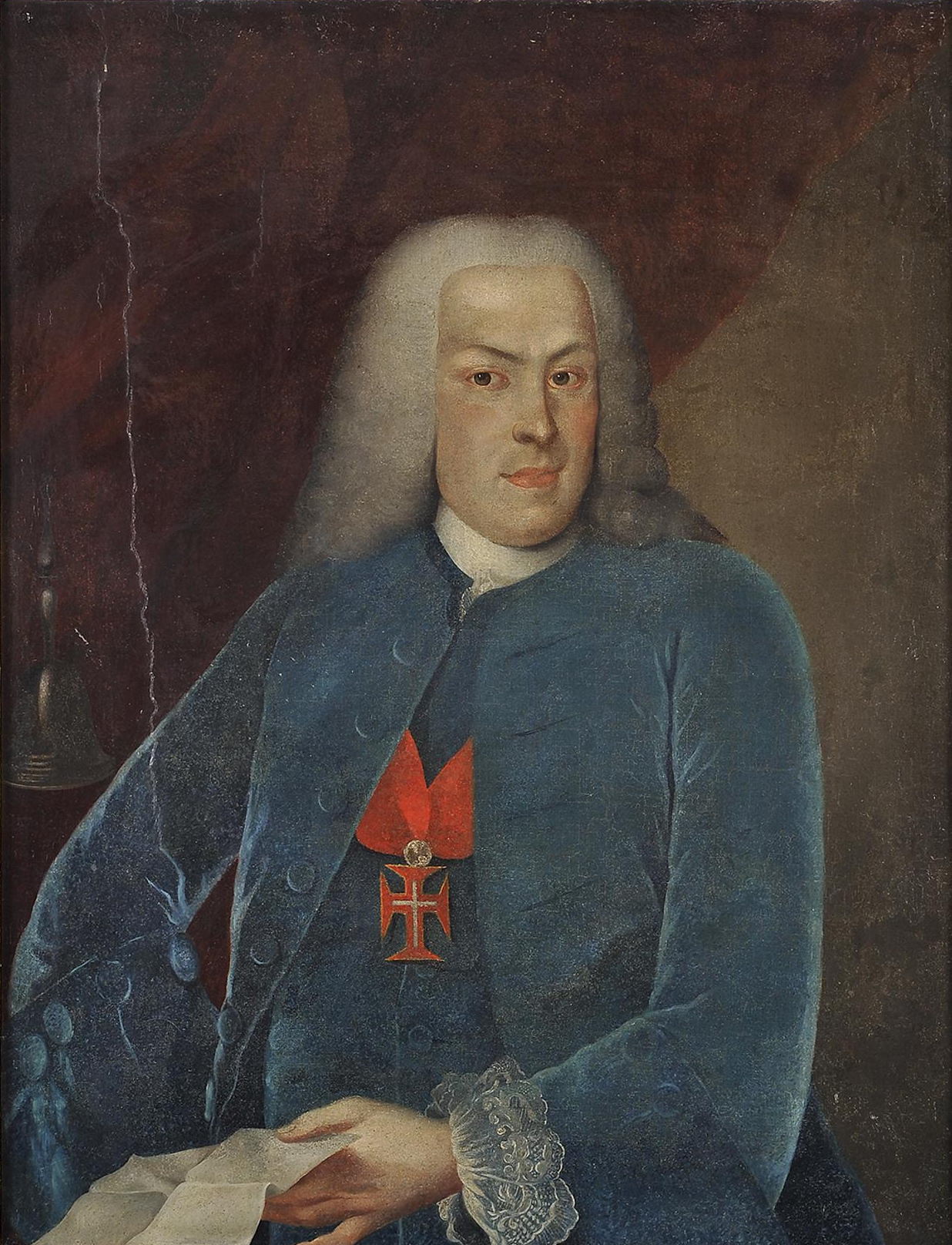
Sebastião José de Carvalho e Melo, 1st Marquis of Pombal

The earthquake had a major effect on politics. The prime minister, Sebastião José de Carvalho e Melo, 1st Marquis of Pombal, was the favourite of the king, but the aristocracy despised him as an upstart son of a country squire. The prime minister, in turn, disliked the old nobles, whom he considered corrupt and incapable of practical action. Before 1 November 1755, there had been a constant struggle for power and royal favour, but the competent response of the Marquis of Pombal effectively severed the power of the old aristocratic factions. However, silent opposition and resentment against King Joseph I began to rise, culminating in his attempted assassination in 1758 and the subsequent reprisals eliminating the powerful Duke of Aveiro and the Távora family.

In 1752, a Sebastianist prophet predicted that a terrible earthquake would destroy Lisbon on All Saints' Day. After the earthquake struck on All Saints' Day 1755, there was a surge of converts to Sebastianism.

== Development of seismology ==
The prime minister also ordered the collection of factual data, sending a query to all parishes of the country regarding the earthquake and its effects. Questions included:

- At what time did the earthquake begin and how long did it last?
- Did you perceive the shock to be greater from one direction than another, say from north to south? Did buildings seem to fall more to one side than the other?
- How many people died, including names of distinguished persons?
- Did the sea rise or fall first, and how many hands did it rise above the normal?
- If fire broke out, how long did it last and what damage did it cause?

The priests' answers are still archived in the Torre do Tombo national archive, enabling modern scientists to reconstruct the event. Because Pombal was the first to attempt a large-scale objective investigation of an earthquake, he is regarded as a forerunner of modern seismology.

== In popular culture ==
- Voltaire's Candide includes a depiction of the main character during the devastation of the earthquake and its aftermath.
- The 18th-century English Baroque composer Richard Carter composed and published an ode on the earthquake.
- A fictionalised version of the earthquake is a main plot element of the 2014 video game Assassin's Creed Rogue by Ubisoft.
- 1755 by the Portuguese Gothic metal band Moonspell is a concept album detailing the story of the Great Lisbon earthquake.
- The earthquake is one of the places and times depicted in Avram Davidson's book Masters of the Maze.

== See also ==
- 1755 Cape Ann earthquake
- 1761 Portugal earthquake
- Earthquake Baroque
- List of earthquakes in Portugal
- List of historical earthquakes
- List of megathrust earthquakes
- List of tsunamis
- Southwest Iberian Margin

== Sources ==
- Fonseca, Joao F. B. D. (2020), "A Reassessment of the Magnitude of the 1755 Lisbon Earthquake", Bulletin of the Seismological Society of America, 110 (1): 1–17, Bibcode:2020BuSSA.110....1F, doi:10.1785/0120190198, S2CID 213399185
- Gunn, A.M. "Encyclopedia of Disasters". Westport, Connecticut: Greenwood Publishing Group, 2008. ISBN 978-0-313-34002-4.
- Hamacher, Werner. "The Quaking of Presentation." In Premises: Essays on Philosophy and Literature from Kant to Celan, pp. 261–293. Stanford University Press, 1999. ISBN 978-0-8047-3620-6.
- Kendrick, T.D. The Lisbon Earthquake. Philadelphia and New York: J. B. Lippincott, 1957.
- Pereira, A.S. "The Opportunity of a Disaster: The Economic Impact of the 1755 Lisbon Earthquake". Discussion Paper 06/03, Centre for Historical Economics and Related Research at York, York University, 2006.
- Shrady, Nicholas. The Last Day: Wrath, Ruin & Reason in The Great Lisbon Earthquake of 1755, Penguin, 2008, ISBN 978-0-14-311460-4
