= 1531 Lisbon earthquake =

Earthquake in Portugal

- Location within Portugal
- Local date: 26 January 1531
- Local time: 04:00 to 05:00
- Magnitude: 6.4–7.1 M_{w} (est.)
- Epicenter: 39°N 8°W
- Areas affected: Kingdom of Portugal
- Max. intensity: MMI X (Extreme)
- Casualties: 30,000 deaths

The 1531 Lisbon earthquake occurred in the Kingdom of Portugal on the morning of 26 January 1531, between 4 and 5 o'clock. The earthquake and subsequent tsunami resulted in approximately 30,000 deaths. Despite its severity, the disaster was not widely documented until the rediscovery of contemporary records in the early 20th century.

== Event ==
The earthquake is believed to have been caused by the Lower Tagus Fault Zone and was preceded by a pair of foreshocks on 2 January and 7 January. Damage to the city, especially the downtown area, was severe: approximately one-third of the structures in the city were destroyed and 1,000 people died in the initial shock.

Contemporary reports tell of flooding near the Tagus River, ships being thrown onto rocks, and others grounded on the river's floor as the water retreated. Miranda et al. conclude that "these observations are coherent with the existence of a large change in the estuary seafloor, either tectonic displacement or a landslide."

== Aftermath ==
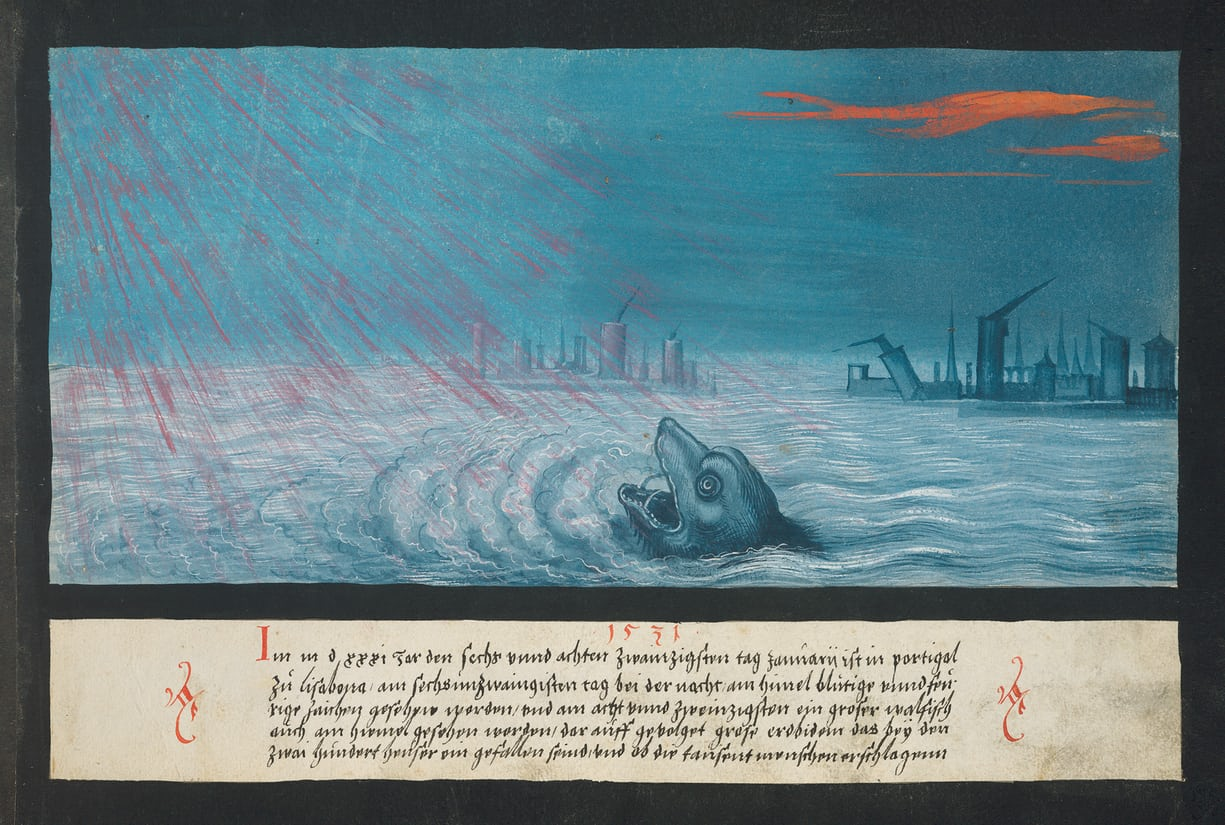
A depiction of the 1531 Lisbon earthquake in the Augsburg Book of Miracles, c. 1550s

The earthquake was followed by several strong aftershocks, and fear of another earthquake was intense. Mass hysteria accompanied by all manner of religious demonstrations (donations, pilgrimages, sermons, etc.) was felt through the kingdom. The events that followed are closely compared to those following the 1755 earthquake, from the king taking refuge in tents, in Palmela, to the religious and civil repercussions and the response of the state.

Rumors spread quickly after the tremor, apparently encouraged by the friars of Santarém, that the disaster was divine punishment (Latin: Ira Dei lit. 'Wrath of God') and that the Jewish community was to blame. Poet and playwright Gil Vicente, who was present in that city during the quake, reportedly personally defused the situation while scolding the friars for their fear-mongering in a powerfully written letter to King John III, and possibly averting a massacre of Jews and recent converts to Christianity.

== Rediscovery ==
The 1531 earthquake, like the 1321 earthquake, was not widely documented until the early 20th century. In 1909, a Portuguese newspaper reported the discovery of an unsigned manuscript of eyewitness accounts of the disaster. In 1919, a four-page letter addressed to the Marquis of Tarifa was found in a Lisbon bookshop, which appeared to describe the earthquake. Sousa's 1919 investigation of the 1755 Lisbon earthquake provided more evidence for the 1531 event, particularly his compilation of answers to the Marquis of Pombal's survey in the wake of the 1755 disaster, which included a question about previous earthquakes.

== See also ==
- List of earthquakes in Portugal
