= Augsburg Book of Miracles =

16th-century book manuscript

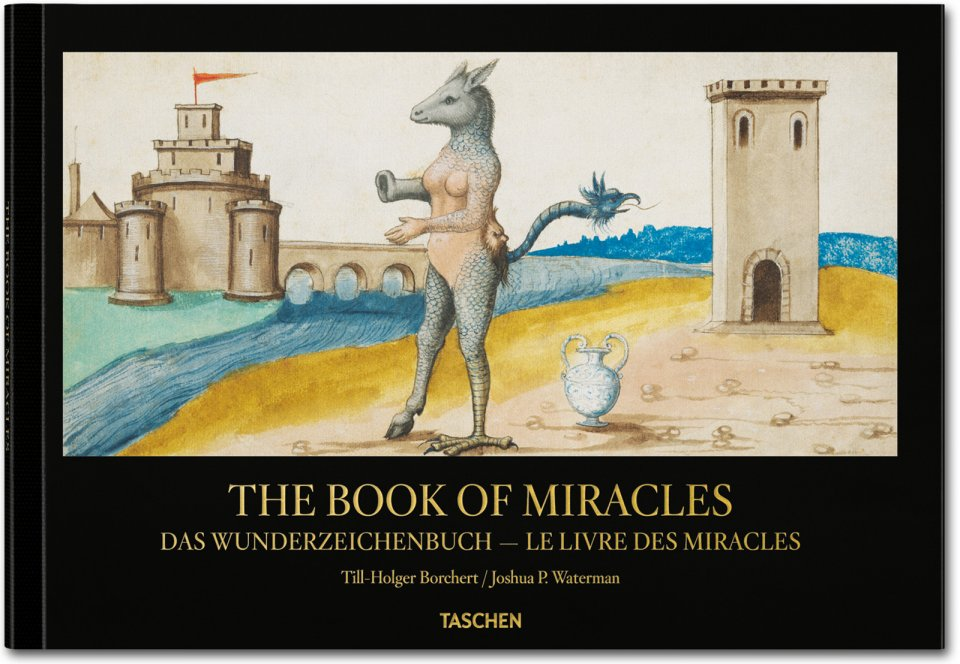
Front cover of the first edition Taschen publication of the Augsburg Book of Miracles (published 2013). The image shows Folio 90, the Tiber River monster, reputedly washed up after a flood of 1496.

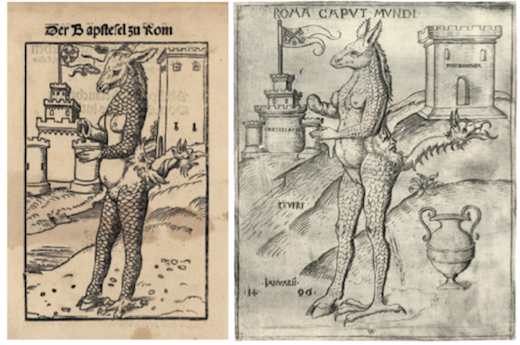
Contemporary sources for Folio 90: left, The Papal Ass of Rome (1523) by Lucas Cranach the Elder; right, Roma caput mundi (c. 1496–1500) by Wenzel von Olmüz.

The Augsburg Book of Miracles (German: Augsburger Wunderzeichenbuch, also known simply as The Book of Miracles) is an illuminated manuscript made in Augsburg in Germany in the 16th century.

== History ==
Based on watermarks on some of the pages, the frequency with which events in Augsburg and its environs appear and the naming of Augsburg artist and printmaker Hans Burgkmair within it, it has been concluded that the manuscript was most likely produced in Augsburg.

The identities of the creators of the manuscript, and the person or persons for whom it was produced, remain something of a mystery. The name of the Augsburg artist and printmaker Hans Burgkmair appears on one page of the manuscript. Till-Holger Borchert, an expert in German Medieval art, suggests that, as Burgkmair the Elder died in the 1530s, the artist in question here must be his son, Hans Burgkmair the Younger, who is much less well attested by known works. In addition, at least two of the images appear to be based on drawings from the workshop of Burgkmair the Younger, leading Borchert to conclude that he was a contributor to the manuscript, possibly in conjunction with Heinrich Vogtherr the Elder and/or Heinrich Vogtherr the Younger.

The manuscript itself was probably produced between 1545 and 1552 (some of the text is lifted from the Luther Bible of 1545; the final image before those from the New Testament Book of Revelation features a hailstorm on the town of Dordrecht in the Netherlands which occurred in 1552).

The leaves were rebound in the nineteenth century. Some are missing, with only one or two recently re-identified.

The manuscript is now in the collection of art collector Mickey Cartin. It is due to be auctioned by Christie’s in London on December 10, 2026.

== Manuscript ==
The manuscript consists of 123 surviving folios with 23 inserts. Each page is illuminated in full colour in gouache and watercolour. Each illumination is captioned in German Gothic script.

In general respects the images follow contemporary manuscripts, in particular Conrad Lycosthenes's Chronicle of Prodigies and Portents (1557) and the Histoires Prodigieuses by Pierre Boaistuau (1560), and designs by contemporary painters and printmakers, including Hans Sebald Beham, Hans Holbein the Younger, Lucas Cranach the Elder and Albrecht Dürer. The captions describe and/or comment on the images and, where appropriate, cite Biblical sources (from the Luther Bible of 1545) or the place and date of the event depicted.

=== Contents ===
The manuscript has no introduction, title page, list of contents or dedication that would be usual for the time. Instead it launches straight into its sequence of illustrations and commentary. It is written in rough chronological order, from the Old Testament through various phenomena and portents from Antiquity up to the time of production and finishing with the Book of Revelation.

==== Old Testament ====
The first section of the book, covering Folios 1 to 15, begins with miracles indicative of God's will before switching to events from the history of the Jews as described in the Old Testament. Subjects covered range from the Flood (Folio 1) to the vision of Ezekiel (Folio 15).

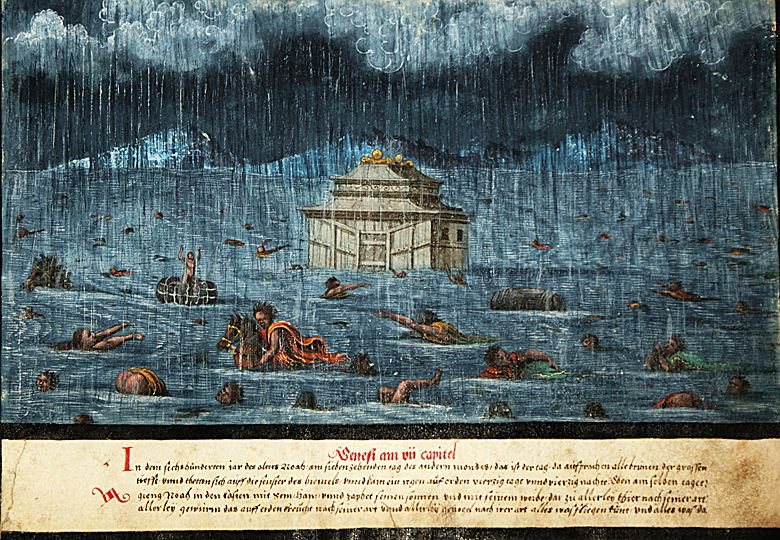
Folio 1. The Deluge

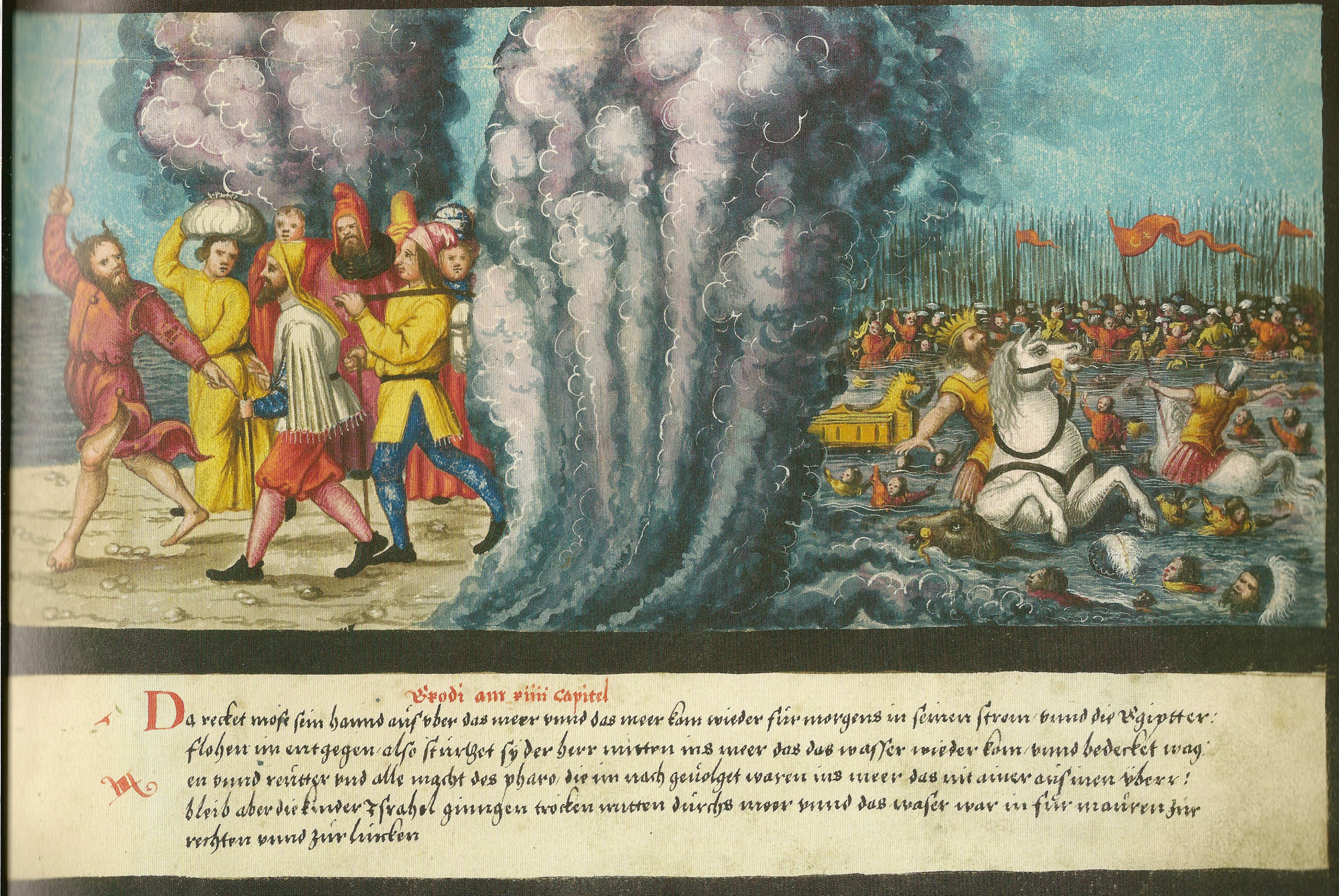
Folio 5. Moses parting the Red Sea

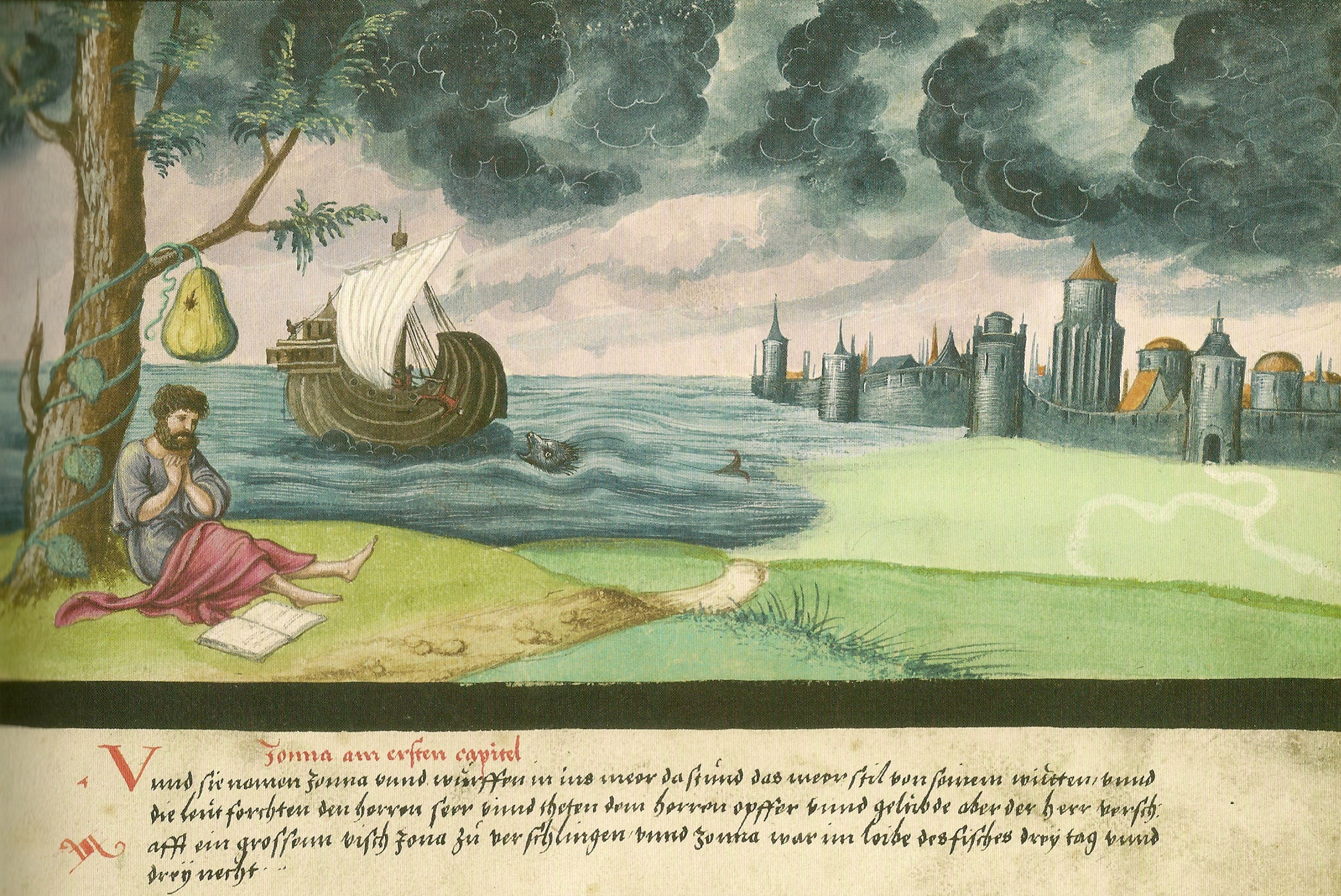
Folio 14. Jonah and the Whale

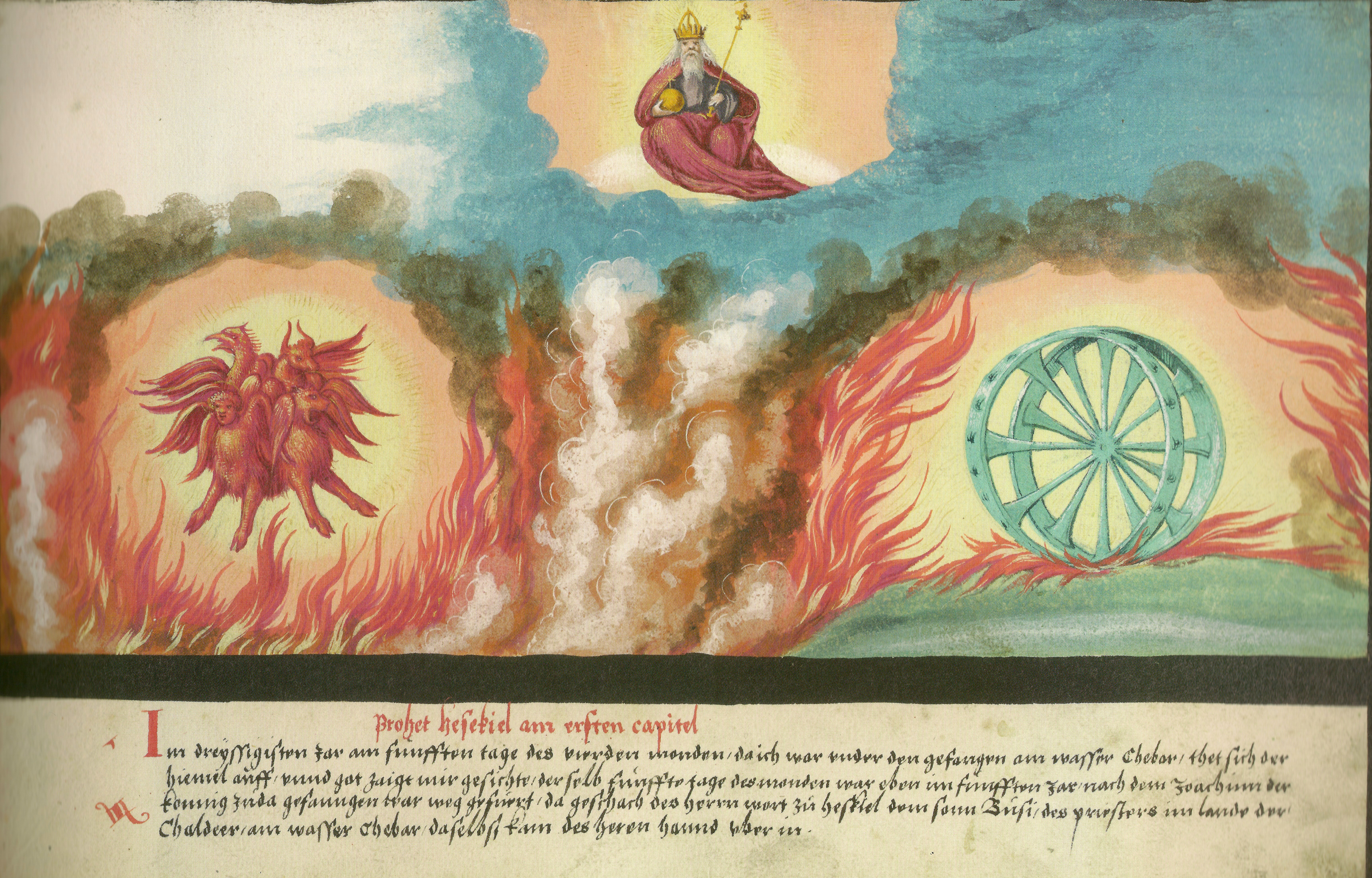
Folio 15. Ezekiel's vision

==== Miraculous signs ====
The second part of the manuscript (Folios 16 to 171) explores non-biblical events from Antiquity up to 1552. This covers numerous subjects, including meteorological and astronomical portents, comets, natural catastrophes, fabulous creatures and freaks of nature.

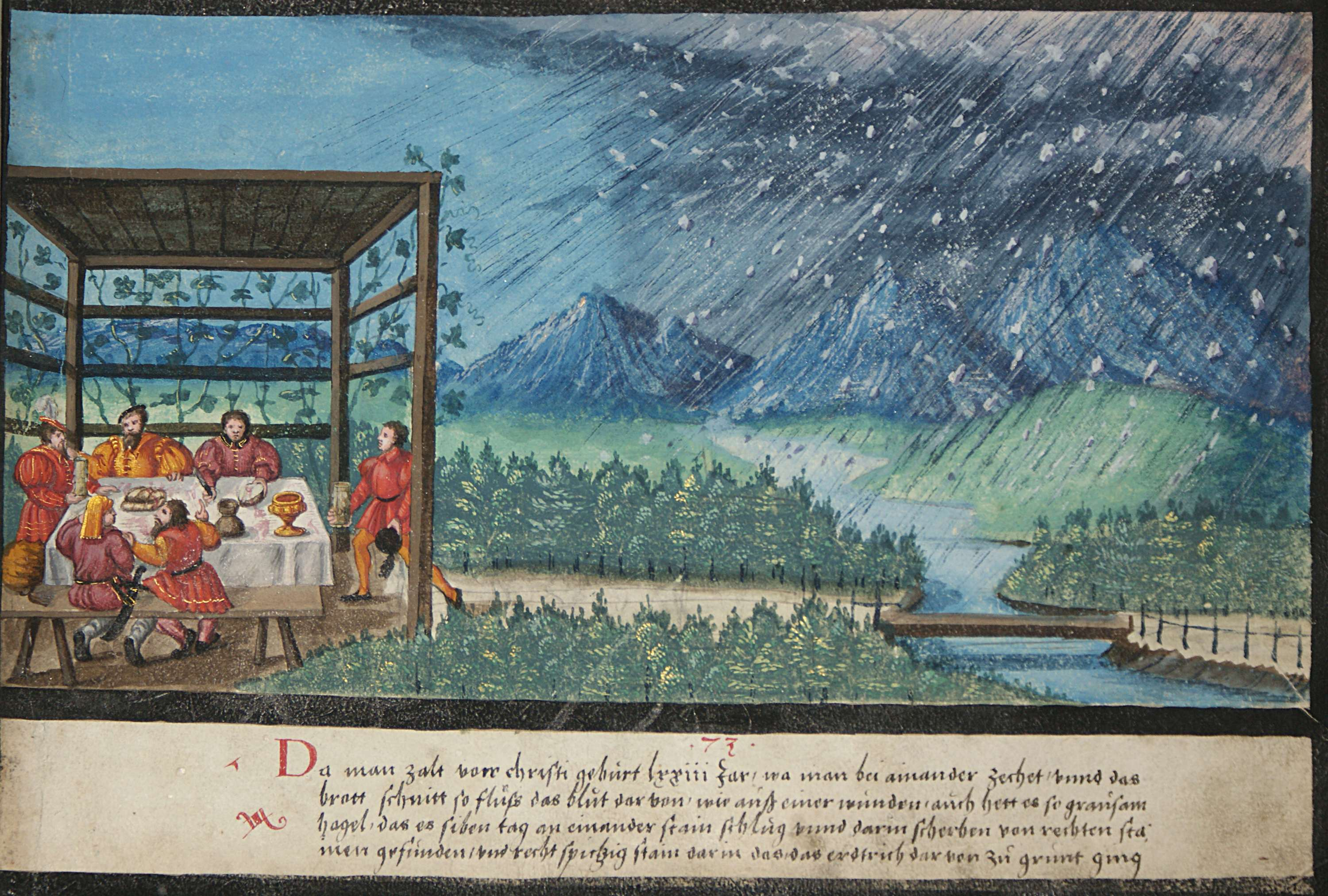
Folio 21. Bleeding bread and hail (73 B.C.)

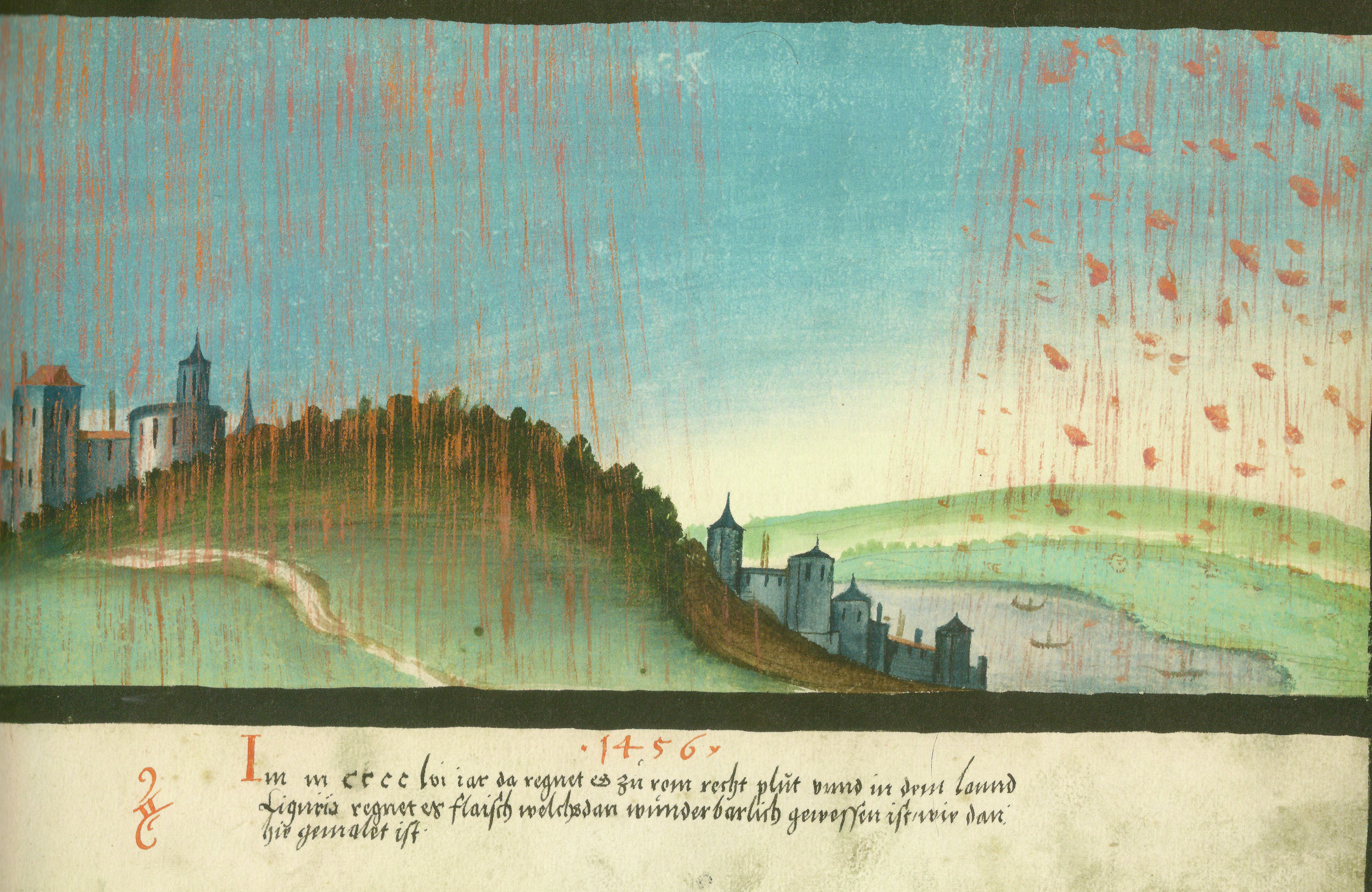
Folio 81. Rain of blood and of flesh (1456)

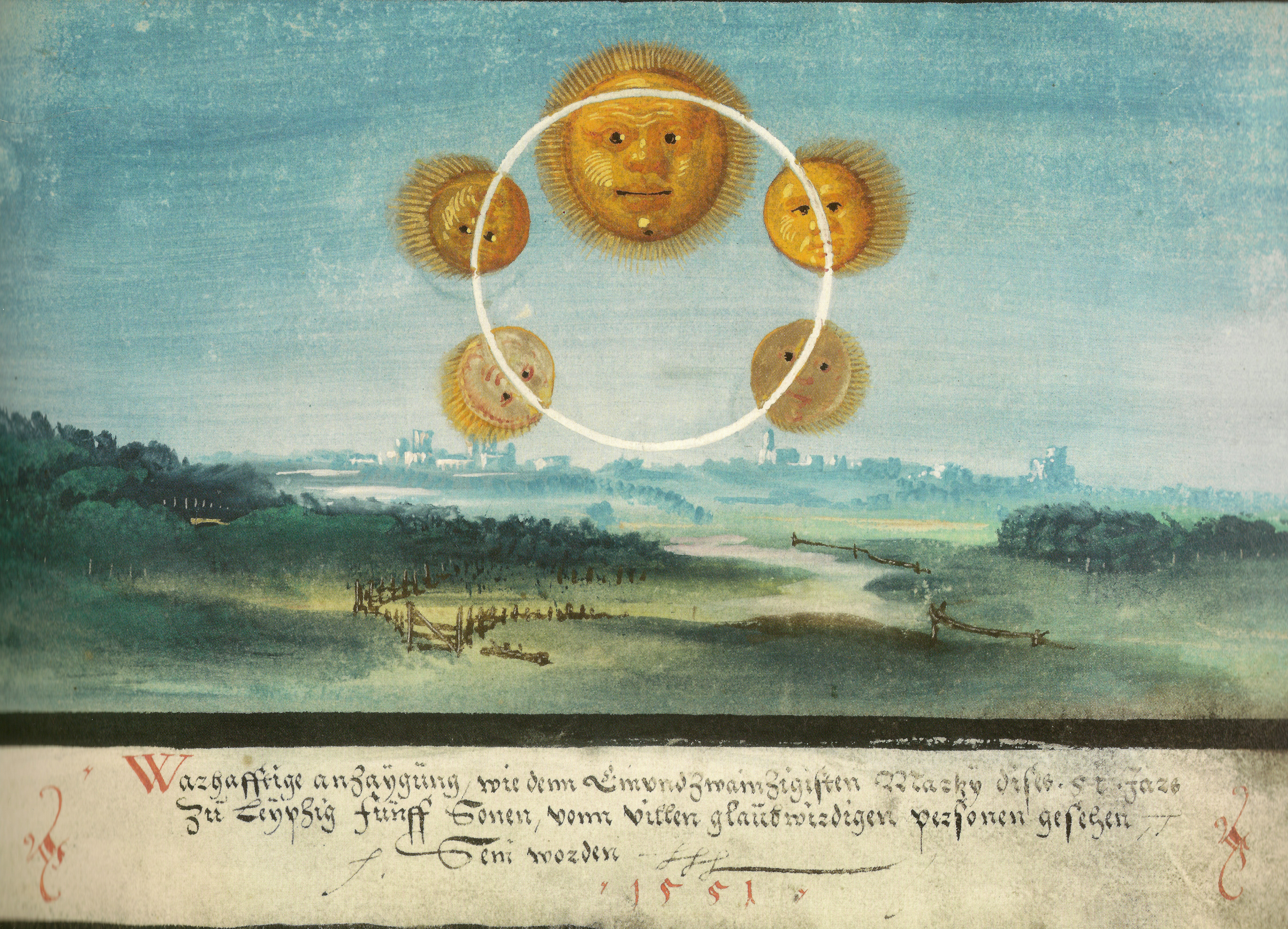
Folio 165. Five suns over Leipzig (1551)

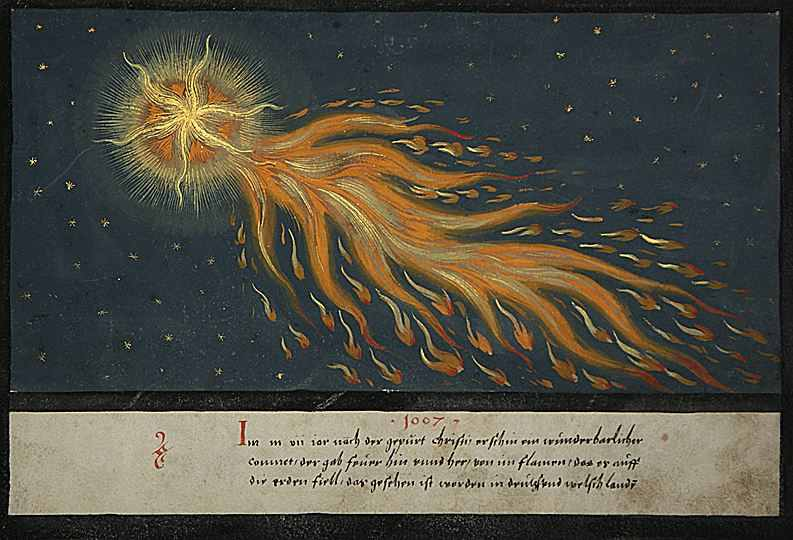
Folio 34. Comet (1007)

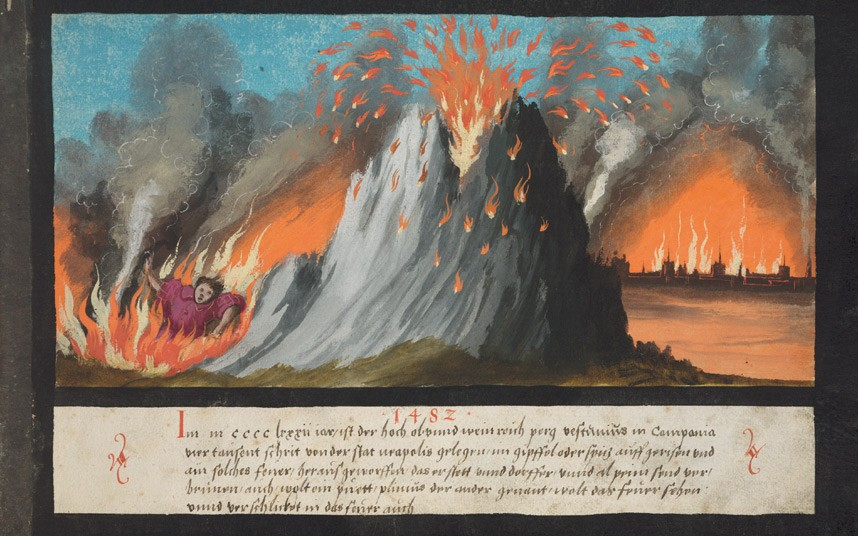
Folio 85. Eruption of Mount Vesuvius (1482) *labelled as such in the manuscript, the eruption actually took place in A.D. 79

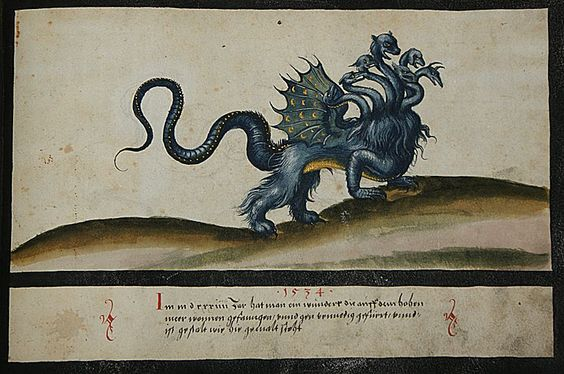
Folio 133. Sea creature (1534)

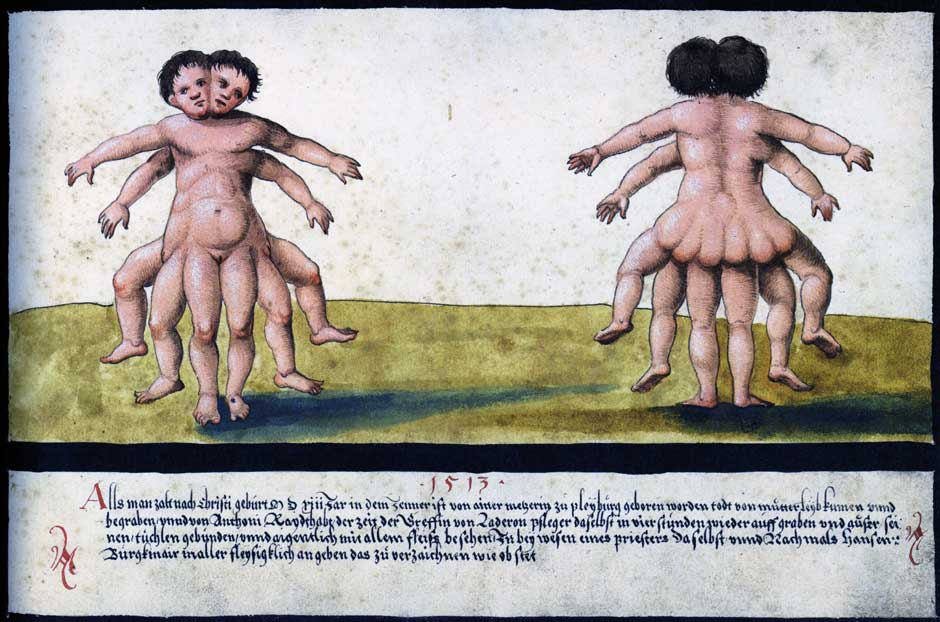
Folio 93. Monstrous birth (1513)

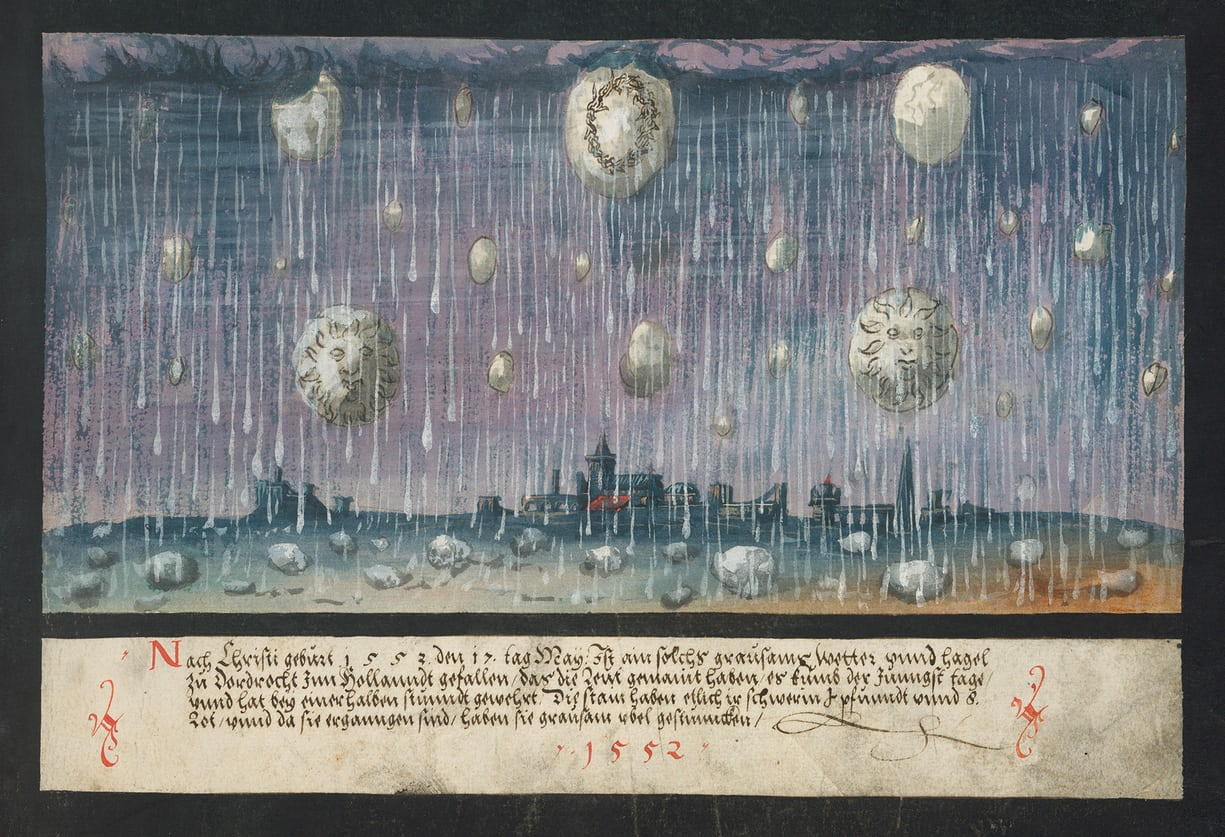
Folio 171. Hail in Dordrecht (1552)

==== The Book of Revelation ====
The final part of the manuscript shows scenes from the final book of the New Testament, The Revelation of St. John the Divine, announcing the end of the world and the Second Coming of Christ. The visions of St. John are presented across nineteen surviving sheets (some are missing) and covers Revelation 1:12–18, St. John's vision of Christ and the seven candlesticks (Folio 172) to Revelation 18:1–3, The Fall of Babylon (Folio 192).

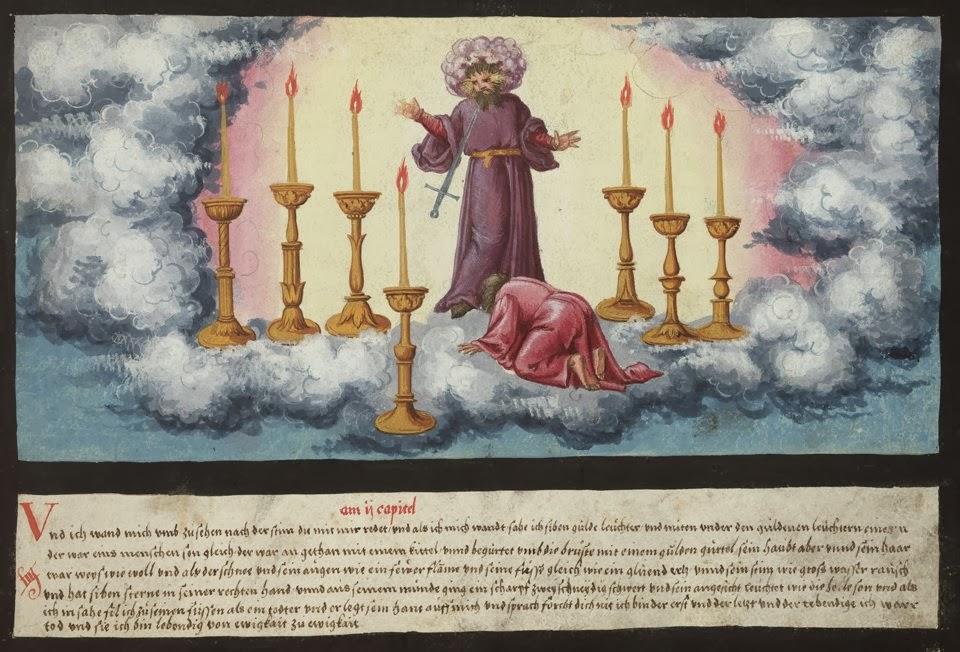
Folio 172. St. John's vision of Christ and the seven candlesticks (Revelation 1:12–18)

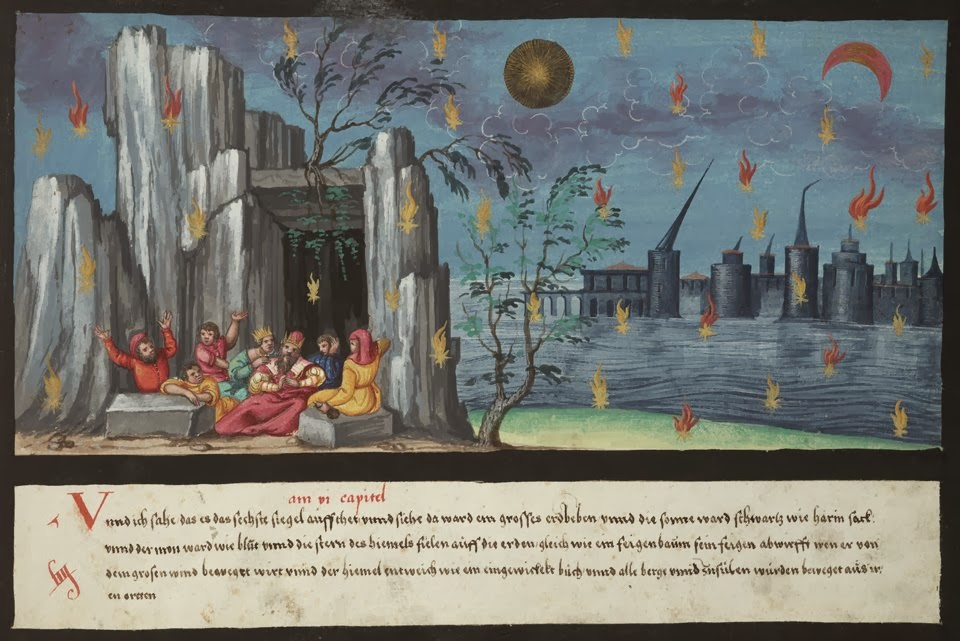
Folio 176. Opening the sixth seal (Revelation 6:12–14)

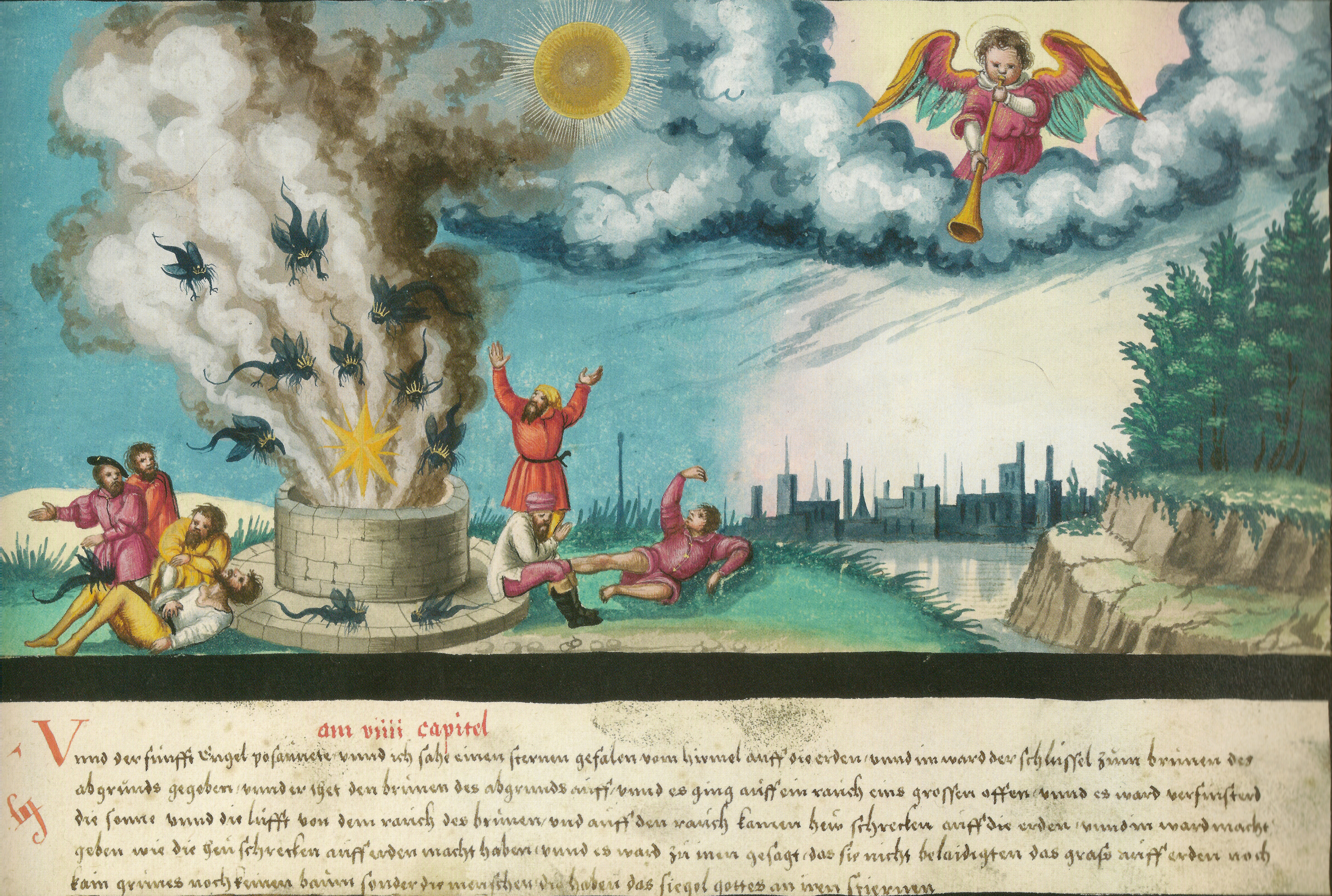
Folio 182. The fifth angel blowing his trumpet (Revelation 9:1–4)

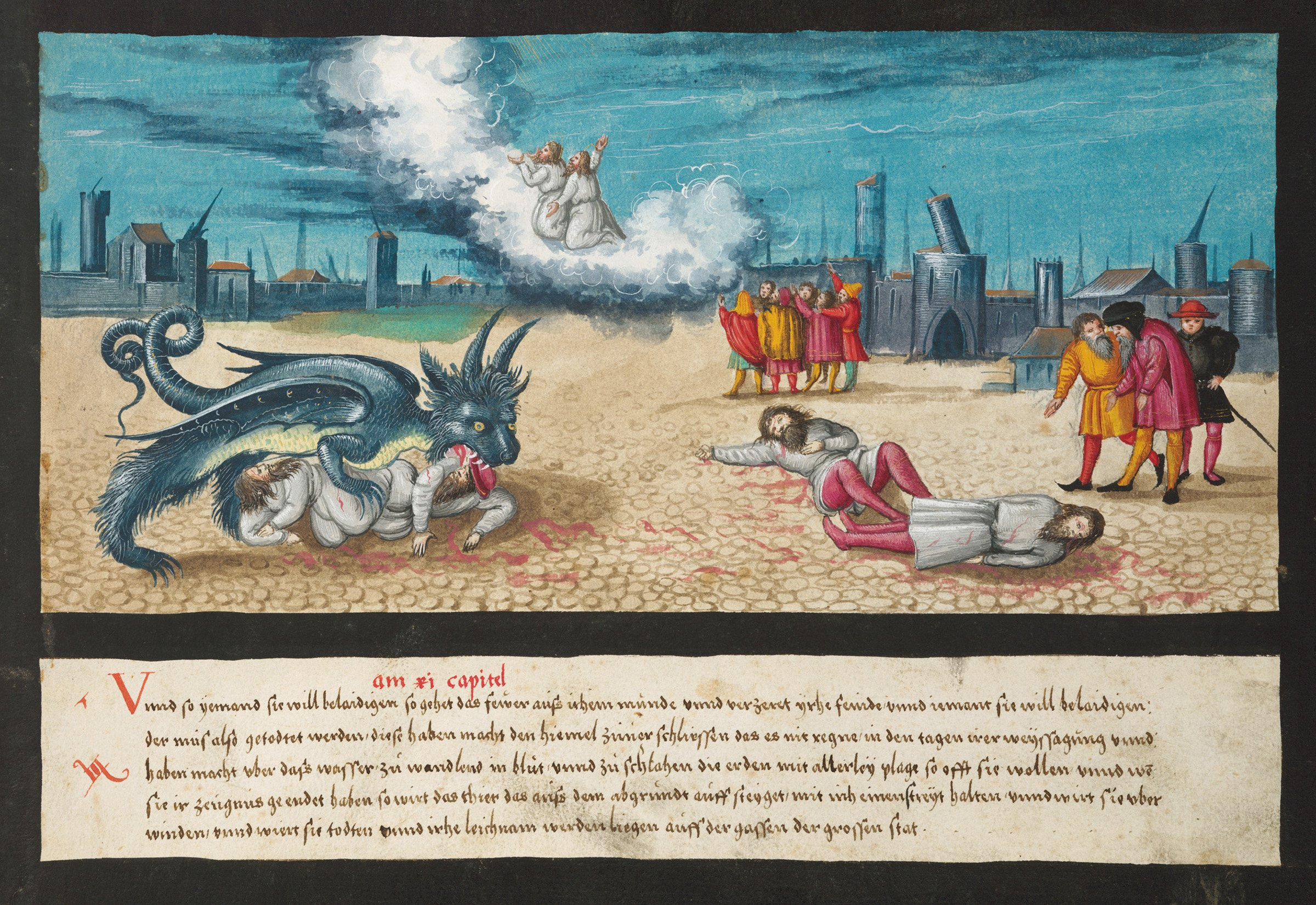
Folio 185. The beast from the bottomless pit (Revelation 11:5–8)

== Modern publication ==
German art book publisher Taschen issued a facsimile edition of the Book of Miracles in 2013. Directed and produced by founder Benedikt Taschen the edition included essays by Northern Renaissance specialist Till-Holger Borchert and expert in German Renaissance art Joshua P. Waterman. The entire text of the original manuscript and the essays are presented in English, German and French. A second edition was produced in 2017.
