= Southwest Iberian Margin =

- Type: Active tectonic zone

The Southwest Iberian Margin (SIM) is an active tectonic zone along and offshore of the coast of Portugal. It is believed to be an incipient subduction zone and the source of the great Lisbon earthquake of 1755.

== See also ==
- Geology of the Iberian Peninsula
