= 1722 Algarve earthquake =

Major Portuguese earthquake and tsunami

- Local date: 27 December 1722
- Local time: between 17:00 and 18:00
- Magnitude: M_{w} 6.5–7.8
- Epicenter: 37.01°N 7.49°W
- Areas affected: Portugal
- Max. intensity: MMI IX (Violent)
- Tsunami: Yes

The 1722 Algarve earthquake occurred on 27 December 1722. It was felt throughout the Portuguese region of Algarve and destroyed a large area in southern Portugal generating a local tsunami that flooded the shallow areas of Tavira. It is unclear whether its source was located onshore or offshore and therefore, what was the tectonic source responsible for the event. Some scientific research work has concluded that the earthquake and tsunami was probably generated offshore, close to 37.01°N 7.49°W. It occurred 33 years before the 1755 Lisbon earthquake which remains a major event in Portuguese history, mainly due to its effects on Lisbon which was wiped out by structural collapse, fire and then the flooding from a tsunami that raced up the Tagus River. Most of the documentation of the 1722 event was sent to Lisbon for archiving and became lost after the fire that followed the 1755 earthquake. But the few surviving written records of the 1722 earthquake describe a destructive series of events affecting several Algarvean localities with earth tremors so strong that they made the bells ring out in Tavira, Faro and Loulé. In Tavira a caravel moored on the river Gilão was left high and dry before the tsunami hit with the dumbfounded crew able to walk to shore. The magnitude is estimated at 6.5 to 7.8 on the moment magnitude scale; due to poor documentation, its magnitude is not well constrained. The earthquake of 1722 was probably caused by a diapirism where dense rock from deeper levels under high pressure pierced shallower materials. As a result, buildings in Albufeira, Faro, Lagoa and Loulé were also severely damaged or, in some cases, destroyed. In the 2010s, studies of seismic risk estimated there would be around 12,000 deaths if an earthquake equal to that of 1722 occurred then during peak season, because population density was significantly higher in the coastal areas of Algarve in the early 21st century, when it had already become a popular international travel destination, than in the 18th century, and construction of high-rise buildings built without proper anti-seismic measures were pervasive in the decades preceding such studies.

== See also ==
- List of earthquakes in Portugal
