= 1761 Lisbon earthquake =

Earthquake and tsunami in the Atlantic Ocean

- Location within North Atlantic
- Local date: 31 March 1761
- Local time: 12:05 WET
- Magnitude: M_{t}8.5
- Epicenter: 34.5°N 13.0°W
- Areas affected: Portugal, Madeira
- Tsunami: Yes
- Casualties: 25 dead

The 1761 Lisbon earthquake struck off the coast of Portugal on 31 March 1761 at 12:05 Western European Time (WET). Estimated to be around 8.5 on the tsunami magnitude scale, the earthquake was the strongest in the region since 1755, and it was felt across many parts of western Europe. Twenty-five people were killed including several people who died from rockfalls in Madeira and collapsed homes at a village near Porto. In Lisbon, the earthquake destroyed several old homes and remaining ruins from the earlier disaster, although no one was killed. The earthquake generated a tsunami that struck the coasts of Portugal, Spain, England, Sicily, the Azores and Barbados, but did not cause damage.

== Tectonic setting ==
The Azores-Gibraltar Fracture Zone (AGFZ) is an east–west trending plate boundary between the Eurasian and Nubian (African) plates between the Azores and Strait of Gibraltar. It accommodates the north-northeast–south-southwest convergence involving both plates. From west to east the plate boundary experiences right-lateral transtension (at Terceira Ridge) to right-lateral strike-slip motion (on the Gloria Fault) to oblique compression around the Gorringe Ridge and Alboran seafloor. About 200 km (120 mi) south of the Gloria Fault, another approximately east–west trending structure also forms part of this plate boundary. This structure has been intepreted to be a reactivated ancient transform fault or an incipient boundary of a microplate.

The exact linearments of the AGFZ, called the Southwest Iberian Margin (SWIM), is uncertain due to multiple complex geologic features. This region is characterised by a broad zone of compression and transpression more than 200 km (120 mi) wide accommodating convergence at a rate of 4–5 mm (0.16–0.20 in) per year. The tectonic convergence is accommodated by northeast–southwest trending thrust faults and west-northwest–east-southeast striking right-lateral strike-slip faults in a region south of the Gorringe Ridge and Gulf of Cádiz.The SWIM is thought to be related to narrow arc subduction beneath the Gibraltar Arc, involving a Jurassic oceanic slab. Whether this subduction is active or not remains debated.

Active faults in the SWIM poses a tsunami and seismic risk to populated regions nearby like Lisbon. The 1755 and 1969 Lisbon earthquakes involved slip on faults in the SWIM. Among these large northeast trending thrust faults are the Coral Patch, Gorringe Bank, Horseshoe and Marques Pombal faults.

== Earthquake ==
The earthquake occurred on 31 March 1761 at 12:05 WET in Lisbon. While the exact epicenter location varies, the general area is in the SWIM, off the southwest coast of Portugal. Researchers from the National Geographic Institute of Spain placed the epicenter west of Cape St. Vincent. In 1986, Portugal's Laboratório Nacional de Engenharia Civil published its catalog and listed the epicenter further southwest. M. A. Baptista, J. M. Miranda, and J. F. Luis suggested an epicenter near the Ampère Seamount, southwest of the SWIM, and further from the gulf. They also estimated the tsunami magnitude (M_{t}) to be around 8.5 based on modelling a tsunami and comparing the simulated heights with the reported heights and wave period. Their conclusion was based on analyzing the seismic intensity distribution on the Iberian Peninsula and tsunami arrival time observations along the coasts of Portugal, Galicia, Ireland, England and the West Indies. Another tsunami data analysis by Martin Wronna, Maria Ana Baptista and Jorge Miguel Miranda further supported an epicenter area around the Ampère and Coral Patch seamounts.

=== Impact ===
Twenty-five deaths were attributed to the earthquake. In Lisbon, the earthquake was felt with a lower seismic intensity than the 1755 earthquake and there was no serious destruction, but many of the leftover building wreckage from the 1755 event was destroyed. Although there were no deaths in the city, several old homes collapsed while cracks appeared in some new homes. During the earthquake, which some witnesses described as lasting between 3 and 5 minutes, about 300 prisoners managed to escape their facility; all but 14 were subsequently captured. It was also felt strongly at Porto without damage, although in a village about 20 mi (32 km) away, the collapse of 3 or 4 homes left several residents dead. Rockfalls were reported across Madeira and one church was destroyed. Four people died on the islands, including two people on a fishing boat who were killed by rockfalls.

The shock was felt across all of mainland Portugal, the Azores and Madeira islands, and as far as Morocco, Madrid, Cork, Amsterdam and the Canary Islands. It was also felt in parts of Europe without damage. In Madrid, the earthquake shook homes, causing residents to evacuate. At Cork, Ireland, shaking was only reported within an area encompassed by the city gates. At Fort Augustus, Scotland, the water level at Loch Ness rose 2 ft (0.61 m) the first time and 30 in (760 mm) the second; some fishing boats were carried by the motion. This rising and falling of the lake surface continued for 45 minutes.

=== Tsunami ===
The tsunami observations were detailed in letters. At Lisbon, the sea fuctuated by up to 2.4 m (7 ft 10 in) with a 6 minute period that lasted until night, but the city was not inundated. On Terceira and Faial in the Azores, the sea level dropped enough that the wharfs were left dry. The tsunami also caused sea level changes along the coast of Ayamonte, El Puerto de Santa María, Cádiz and Barcelona in Spain, but no information about their wave heights were detailed.

According to William Borlase, at around 16:30 AST on 31 August, on Barbados, the sea began to retreat from the shore and returned with a height of 4 ft (1.2 m). A letter by Abraham Mason described the "extraordinary motion" of the sea, where the tide flowed and receded every eight minutes for three hours. According to the NCEI/WDS Global Significant Earthquake Database, a run-up height of 1.2 m (3 ft 11 in) was listed. At around 17:00 UTC on Mount's Bay in Cornwall, England, the tide rose 6 ft (1.8 m), retreating and advancing five times for one hour. On Sicily, tsunami waves were observed for 2 hours with heights of 0.6–1.2 m (2 ft 0 in – 3 ft 11 in).

== See also ==
- List of historical earthquakes
- List of earthquakes in the Azores
- List of earthquakes in Portugal
