= Werner Hamacher =

German philosopher, literary critic and theorist (1948-2017)

Werner Hamacher (German: [ˈhaːmaχɐ], 1948 – 2017) was a German literary critic and theorist influenced by deconstruction. Hamacher studied philosophy, comparative literature and religious studies at the Free University of Berlin and the École Normale Supérieure (Paris), where he met and came to know Jacques Derrida. From 1998 to 2013 he was a Professor in the University of Frankfurt's Institute for General and Comparative Literature (Institut für Allgemeine und Vergleichende Literaturwissenschaft), and since 2003 he was on the faculty of the European Graduate School in Saas-Fee, Switzerland.

He was previously Professor of German and the Humanities at Johns Hopkins University and taught for a number of years at New York University. He was the author of Pleroma—Dialectics and Hermeneutics in Hegel and Premises: Essays on Philosophy from Kant to Celan and the editor of the series Meridian: Crossing Aesthetics, published by Stanford University Press. He translated a selection of essays by Paul de Man into German.

== Translations ==
- Hamacher, Werner. Para-la filología / 95 Tesis sobre la Filología, Buenos Aires, Miño y Dávila editores, 2011.
- Hamacher, Werner. Lingua amissa, Buenos Aires, Miño y Dávila editores, 2012.

== See also ==
- List of thinkers influenced by deconstruction
