= Church of Santa Bárbara (Vila do Porto) =

- Church of Saint Barbara
- Igreja de Santa Bárabara
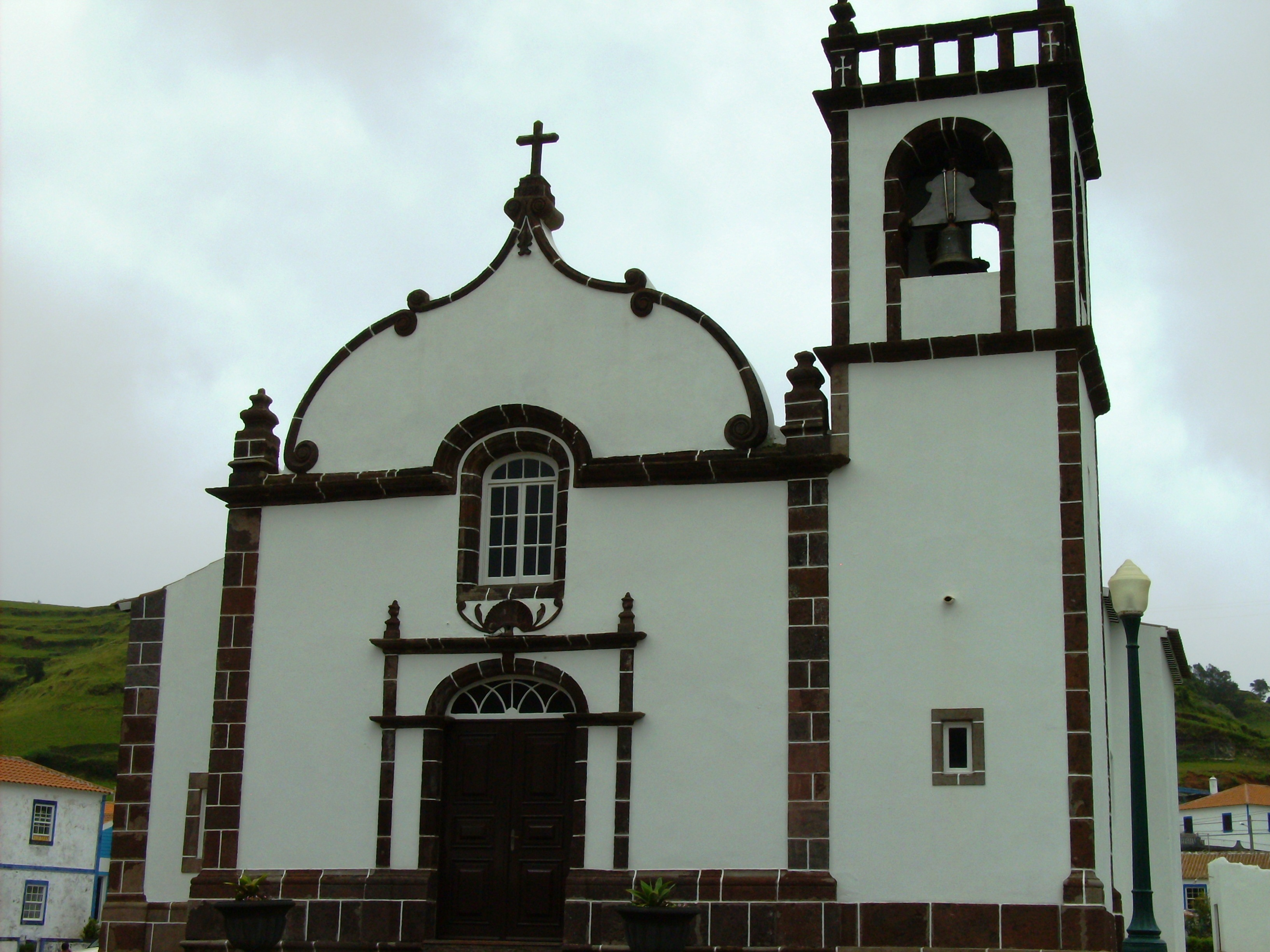
- The front facade of the parochial church of Santa Bárbara

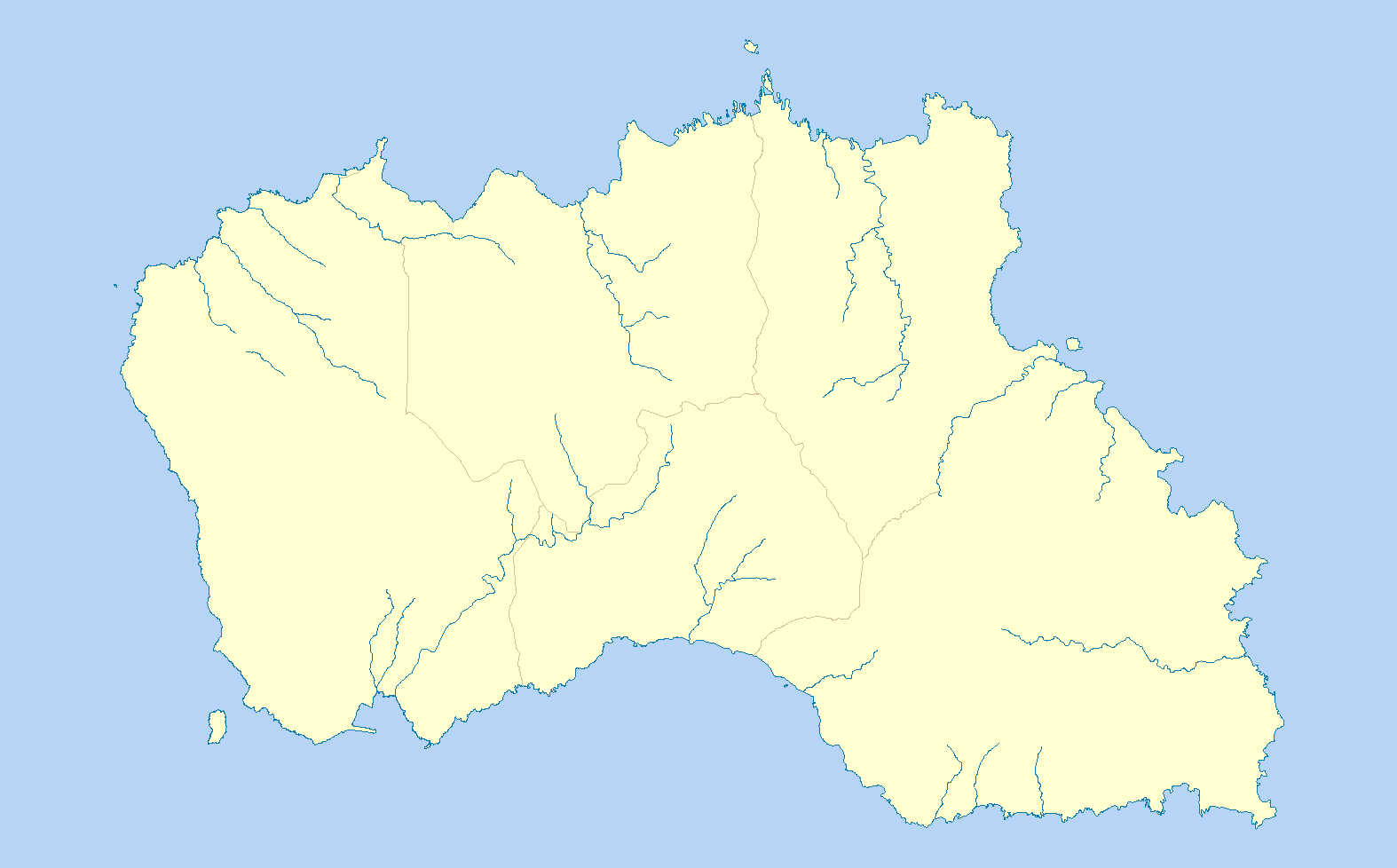
- Location of the church on the island of Santa Maria
- 36°59′4.75″N 25°4′6.46″W
- Location: Santa Maria, Eastern, Azores
- Country: Portugal
- Denomination: Roman Catholic

Specifications
- Length: 27.25 m (89.4 ft)
- Width: 14.75 m (48.4 ft)

Administration
- Diocese: Diocese of Angra

The Church of Santa Bárbara (Portuguese: Igreja de Santa Bárbara) is a Roman Catholic church in the civil parish of Santa Bárbara, municipality of Vila do Porto, in the archipelago of the Azores. Located in the valley of the same name, the parochial church of Santa Bárbara was constructed sometime in the early 15th century and served the impoverished parish throughout its history, supported by personal donations and community assistance.

== History ==
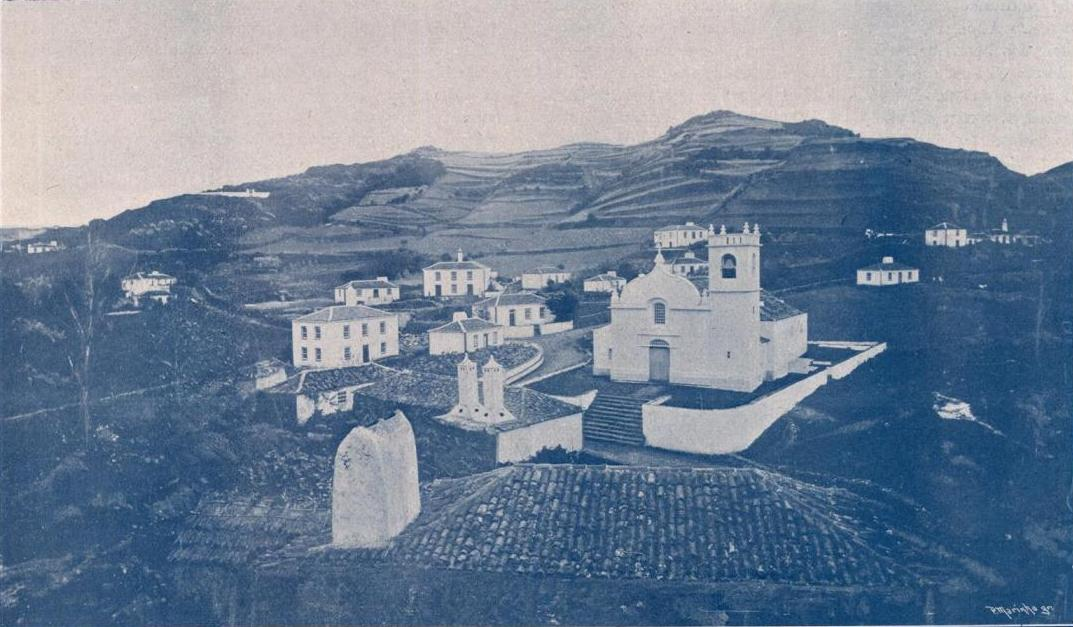
Igreja de Santa Bárbara (Álbum Açoriano, 1903).

The oldest reference to the temple was encountered in the testament of João Tomé, the "Amo", dated 13 March 1537, who indicated that the current church was established on chapel constructed in the same century. From the work of Gaspar Frutuoso, the temples first cura was the Micalense Bartolomeu Luiz. At the time of this chronicler (sometime at the end of the 16th century) the vicary of Santa Bárbara was awarded 24$000 reis, and later (1700), the parish received seven moios and 19 alqueires of wheat, in addition to 10$333 réis.

Between 1571 and 1616 it was its parish priest, Father Manuel Fernandes Velho, who was captured and imprisoned by Barbary coast pirates, when they raided the island. In his testament Tétouan, this clergyman left a moio of wheat to his church, in order to gild the retable at the time of its remodeling.

In 1661 the parishioners were challenged to expand the church, and were directed to the Mesa da Consiência e Ordens (Bureau of Awareness and Orders) in order to obtain an eight bell carillon. Around 1666 it was necessary to decorate the apse, and the cleric ordered a silver monstrance, to replace the simple wooden ostensorium. In 1762, another campaign was begun to expand the church.

A humble community, an examination of the parochial records, the church was dependent on the efforts of its residents to influence the Commanders in order to support and maintain the cult. In May 1674, the bishop (Friar Lourenço de Castro while on a visit to the church, ordered the vicarage priest to begin ordering from the ombudsman the materials to start the expansion of the church.

The church was referenced by Monte Alverne (1986) at the end of the 17th century, identifying a vicarage, curate and treasury

In 1696, there was a prohibition by the bishopric to hold a Christmas Eve feast in the sacristy on the night of Holy Thursday.

A new intervention occurred in 1825, marked by a plaque at the base of the cross of the frontispiece pinnacle.

Father Manuel do Couto Benevides was parish priest here; natural of the parish of Água de Pau (where he was born on 24 November 1849), he was a musician and author of various works, still today sund in the churches of the island. Still in the comarca of Vila do Porto, he was responsible for legal advocacy by the local population, for his eloquent oratory.

The church had a social centre and supported several religious associations during its history.

At the end of the 1950s, it was refurbished and renovated under the initiative of its curate, Cláudio de Medeiros Franco.

The feast of the patron saint occurs annually in December, with mass and procession.

== Architecture ==
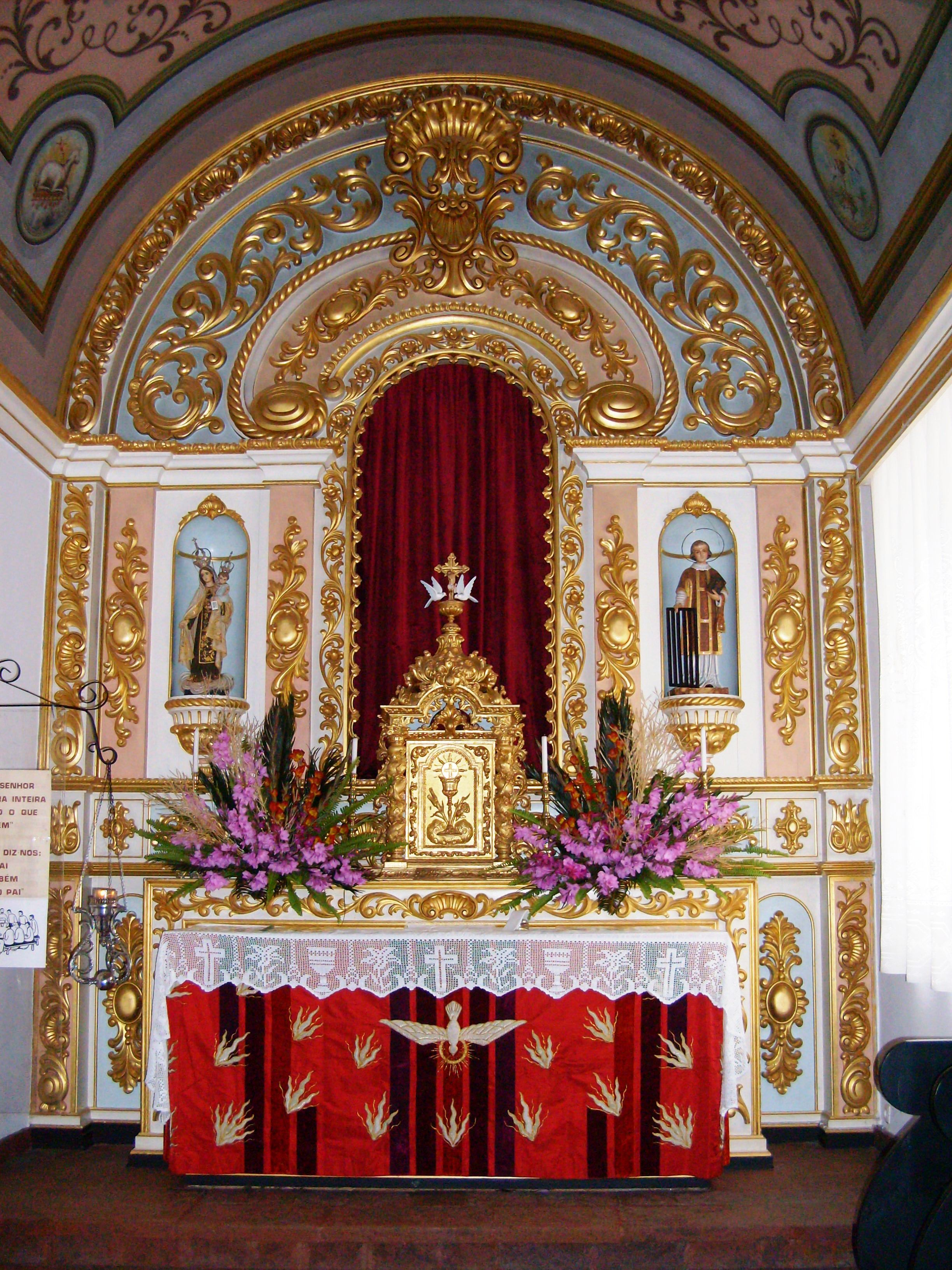
The retable of the church, with wood-gilded altarpiece

In masonry stone plastered and whitewashed, the church consists of a main rectangular nave, chancel, bell-tower and several corps corresponding to the baptistery, the chapels, sacristy and false transept.

The facade faces the Caminho Velho, with the curvilinear frontispiece marked by the main portico and surmounted by window, with gross pinnacles on either corners. A cornice that separates the frontispiece and pinnacles on the facade accompany the curve of the archway to the corners. The doorway is limited by portico of vertical pilasters, salient cornices and embedded pinnacles.

The three-story rectangular bell-tower, whose third-story belfry is limited by cornice and with archways. The tower was decorated by cornices, stonework guard (with crosses in bass relief), surmounted by pinnacles on four corners.

The single-nave interior includes angular presbytery while the high-choir, in wood, overhangs the entrance. There are lateral chapels at the front alongside the main altar, marked by Roman arches that lead into the false transept and the two lateral chapels. The triumphal arch, much like the chapels, are decorated with Roman arches.

In the main altarpiece is an image of Santa Bárbara, on the left, an image of Nossa Senhora do Carmo, while on the right São Lourenço. The lateral altars were dedicated to the Sacred Heart of Jesus, São José and Santo António, on the left, and, on the right, the Sacred Heart of Mary. In the body of the church are smaller spaces with altar dedicated to Senhor Santo Cristo and for the baptistery.
