= LORAN Station (Santa Maria) =

- Estação LORAN
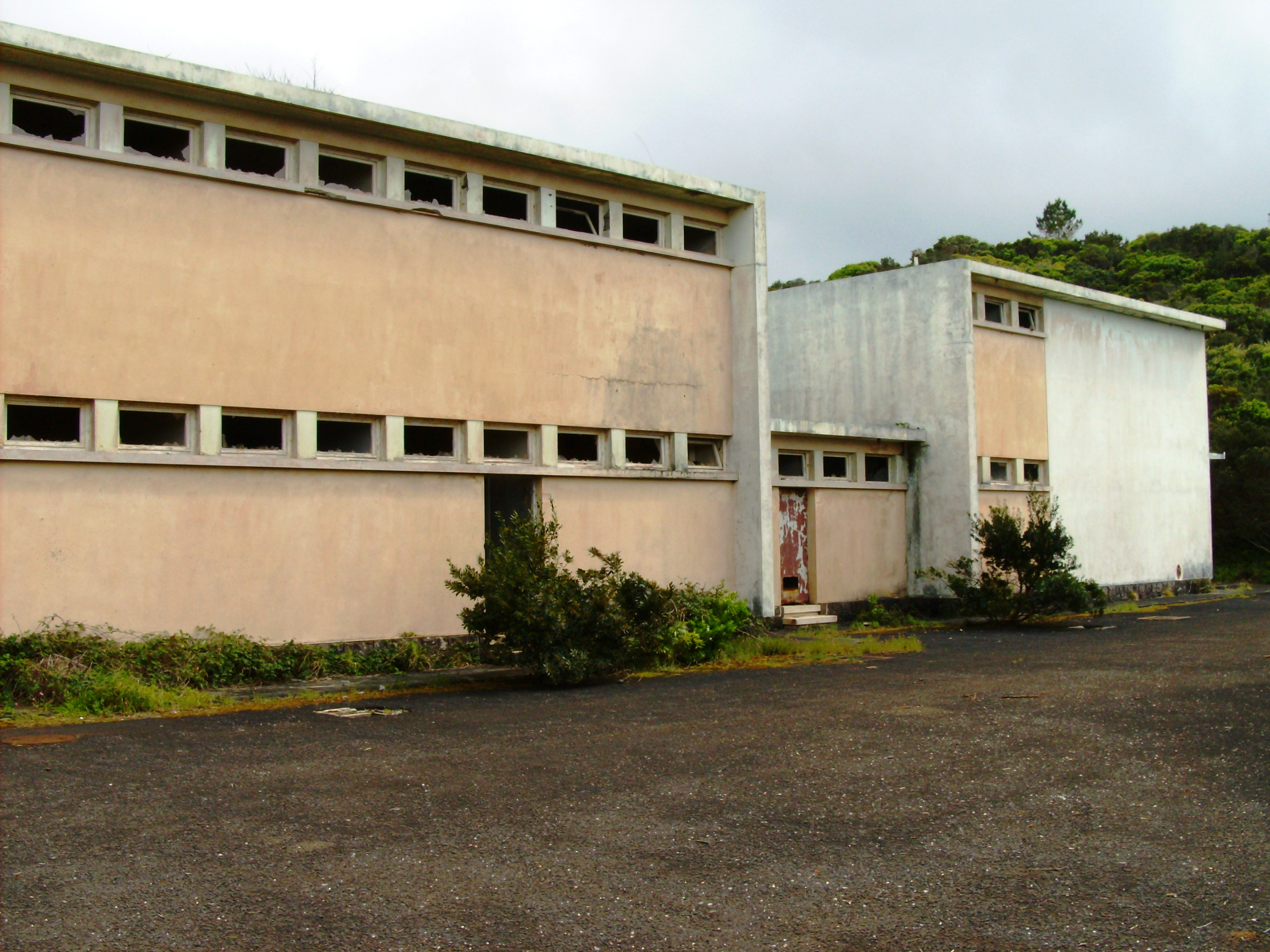
- The main LORAN service building in ruins, as seen in 2008, with vegetation encroaching the spaces

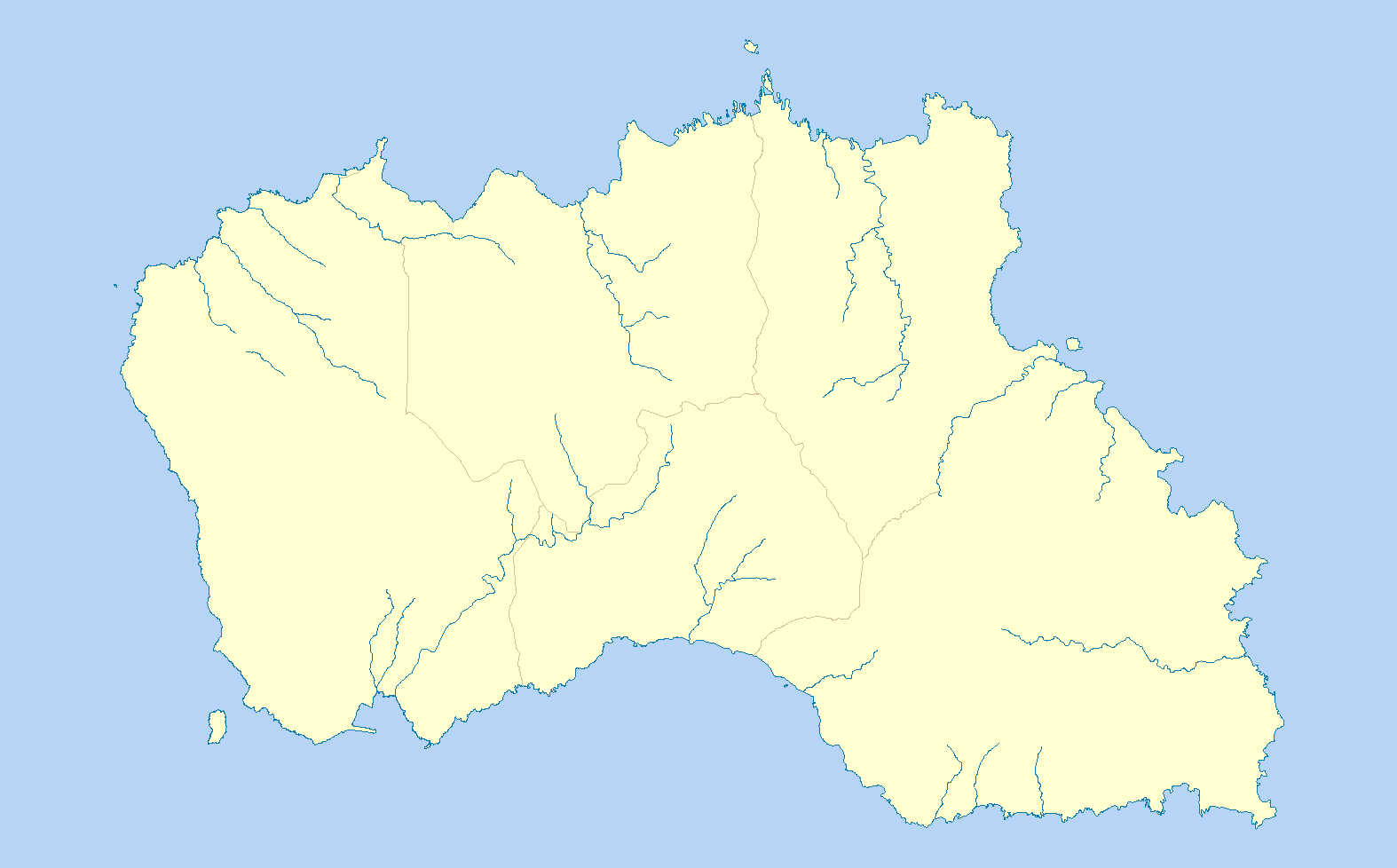
- Location of the LORAN Station on the island of Santa Maria

General information
- Type: Terrestrial Navigation Station
- Architectural style: Modern
- Location: Norte, Vila do Porto, Portugal
- Coordinates: 37°0′40.73″N 25°3′26.8″W
- Owner: Portuguese Republic

The LORAN Station (Santa Maria) (Portuguese: Estação LORAN de Santa Maria) is a long-range navigational station abandoned after the beginning of the 1980s, following cessation of service in the North Atlantic. Located in the locality of Norte, in the civil parish of Santa Bárbara in the municipality of Vila do Porto, the station was closed in the 1980s, and the buildings eventually left to ruins.

== History ==
The station was constructed and, originally, operated by NATO-member France, as part of its obligations to the North Atlantic alliance.

The long-range navigational station was part of the NATO-D system LORAN-A, operated by the Portuguese Marines between 1965 and 31 December 1977. Santa Maria was a relay point of the LORAN Station in Sagres, and extended to Santa Mara (STA "I"), which acted as a master site for the base at Flores (STA "F", branch 1S7) and Porto Santo (STA "P", branch 1S6).

After its closer (on 30 June 1978), the Regional Government of the Azores maintained security at the installation. By the middle of the 1980s, this vigilance was cancelled the complex was sacked by its local population, resulting in its state of ruin, degradation and eventual encroachment by vegetation. The spaces were vandalized, occupied by young adults during the summer, afflicted with graffiti and messages on its walls, while it became a point of interest for summer visitors.

The equipment, furnishings and lands are owned by the Portuguese Republic, through the Portuguese Marines and NATO, by way of COMIBERLANT, and under the stewardship of the Regional Government and the Municipal Council of Vila do Porto.

The Regional Directorate for the Environment and Sea (Portuguese: Secretaria Regional do Ambiente e do Mar) underwent an environmental hazards cleanup at the site in 2008; the intervention permitted the removal of various types of residuals (ferrous, electrical, waste, drums, tires and plastics), in order to improve island ecology. The intervention was assisted by the Serviços Florestal e de Desenvolvimento Agrário de Santa Maria (Forest Service and Agrarian Development), a delegation from the Regional Secretariate for Equipment and Habitation (Portuguese: Secretaria Regional da Habitação e Equipamento), the local municipal and parish councils.

== Architecture ==
The station is located in the extreme northeast of the island, in the locality of Norte, along an isolated roadway towards the clifftops and coast of the island. The area is consistent with the volcanic nature of the island, with volcanic plugs located in the region, while the station is located on a high plateau overlooking the sea consisting.

The site included a group of buildings and exterior structures, integrated by a main service building, garage, twinned and groups of residential buildings, with paved exterior roadways. Owing to its importance initially, the site also included a generator building and garage to support 24-hour operations.

All the buildings were constructed in the language of the Modernist movement, with regional influences, constructed in reinforced concrete, with separator walls erected from stone, in irregular and rustic finish.

The exterior spaces, originally, included public green-spaces and well-manicured private residences, associated with the families that made-up the community at the station.

Near the buildings is a sports field.

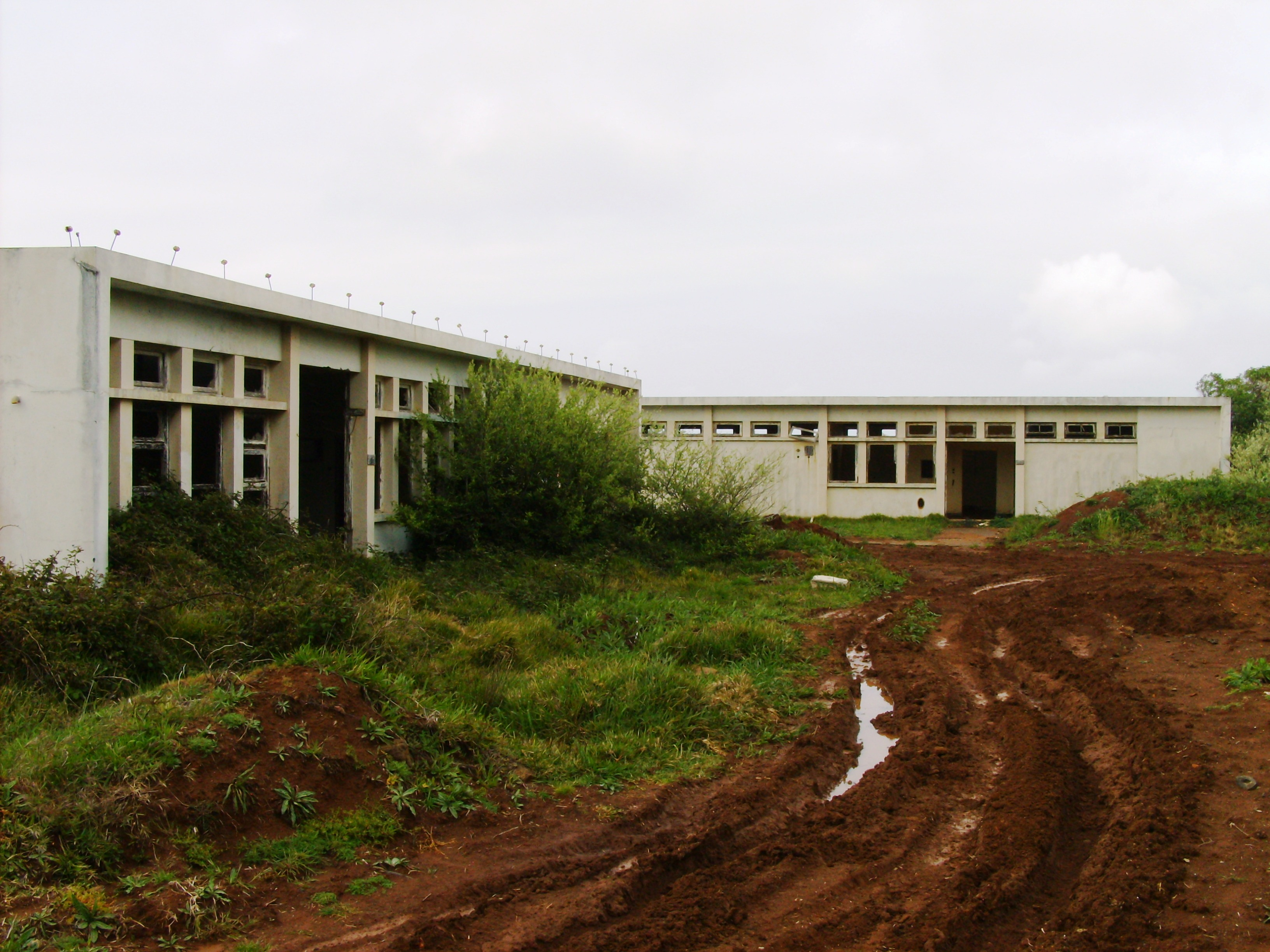
LORAN Station generator and office buildings

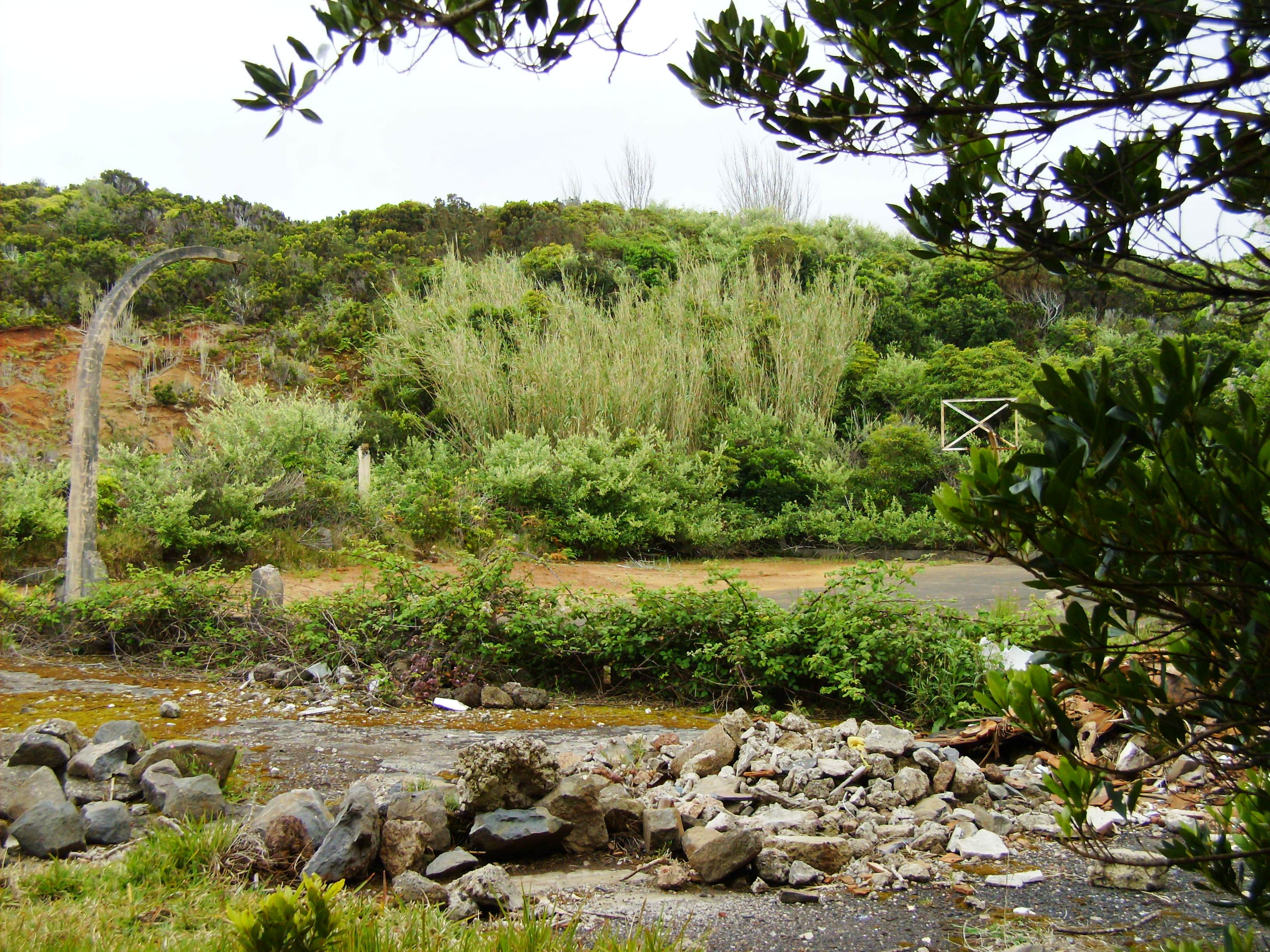
Remnants of the sports field near the station, abandoned and overgrown

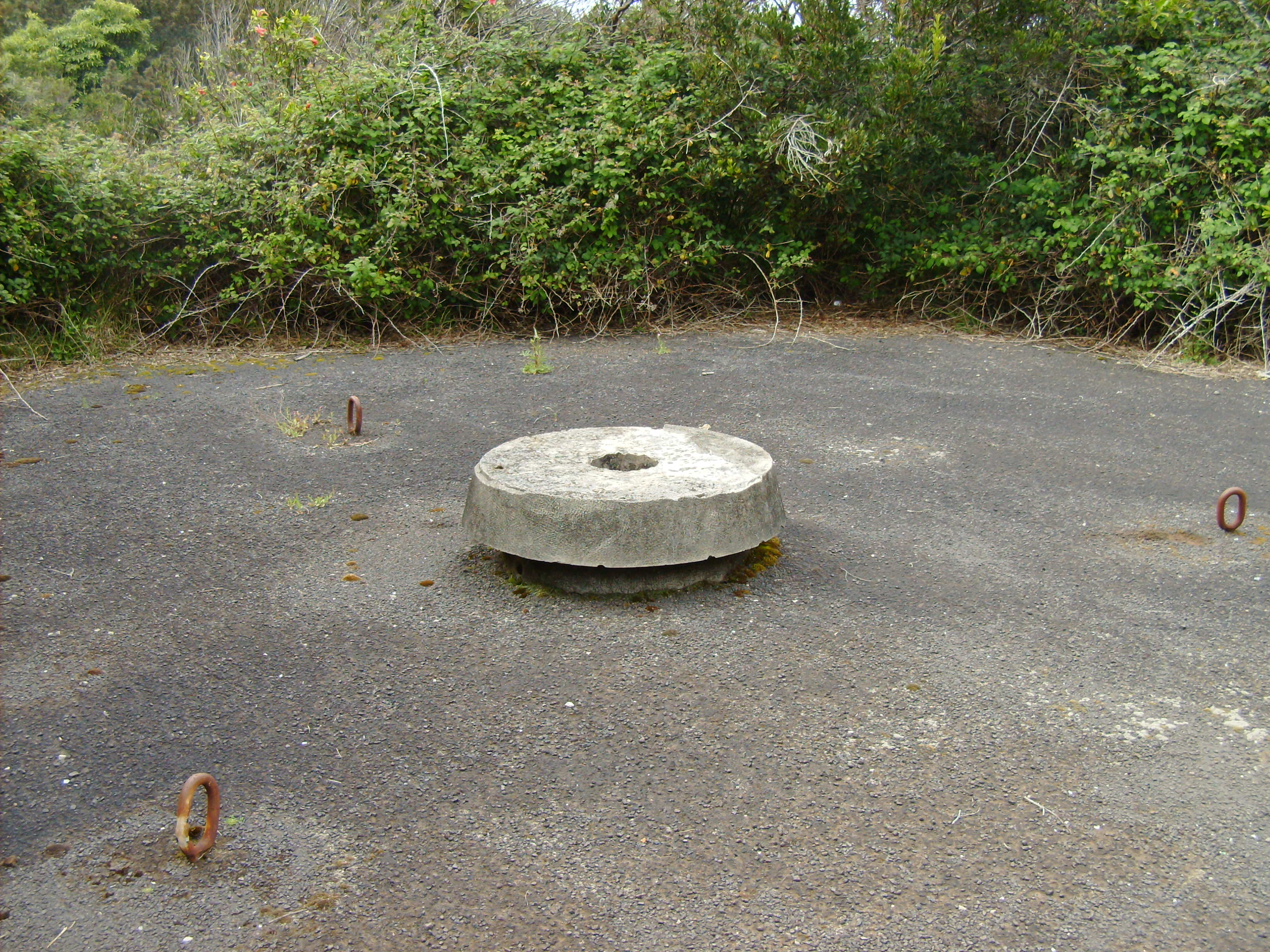
Remnants of the antenna mount, part of the main radio navigation system
