= Hermitage of São Tiago =

- Ermida de São Tiago
- Interactive map of the Hermitage of São Tiago area

General information
- Type: Hermitage
- Architectural style: Medieval
- Location: Água de Pau, Lagoa, Portugal
- Coordinates: 37°43′25.2″N 25°30′42.1″W
- Opened: 18th century
- Owner: Portuguese Republic

Technical details
- Material: Basalt

The Hermitage of São Tiago (Portuguese: Ermida de São Tiago) is a medieval hermitage located in the civil parish of Água de Pau, in the municipality of Lagoa, on Portuguese island of São Miguel, archipelago of the Azores.

== History ==
The hermitage was constructed in the beginning of the 18th century for a private landowner and built alongside his residential home (but concluded before the manor house).

The first pastoral visit to the hermitage occurred in 1707. In the will and testament of vicar João Pacheco Raposo (dated 6 June 1715), the former prelate referred to the hermitage as a producer of two alqueires of land. This vicar had purchased three-quarters of land and some lands with watermills, and left them to the company of St. James, with the obligation to pay eleven alqueires of wheat yearly for the Holy Sacrament of the town.

In 1871, the hermitage was transferred from the property owners, and became a building of the Junta de Paróquia (parish junta).

The hermitage began to operate as the funerary chapel for the parish council of Água de Pau in 1986 and was remodelled sometime in the 20th century. As part of its transformation, a project to reformulate the Largo de Santiago was begun in 1996, and inaugurated on 20 September 2003.

== Architecture ==
The hermitage is situated on the northern edge of the settlement, in an ample square, alongside the parish council building of Água de Pau and the Casa do Povo. It is encircled by steps and pavement stone and linked transversally by the lateral house.

The rectangular plan consists of a single nave and presbytery with an addorsed lateral left rectangular sacristy. The facades are plastered and painted white with the main facade (oriented to the south) flanked by pilasters and cornerstones surmounted by pinnacles. This facade is terminated with cornices and surmounted by a Latin cross over a cylindrical stand. The entrance is marked by a doorway decorated with cornices and rectangular window protected by wood grade, while the rear is blind.

The interior walls are plastered and painted in white, while the floors and ceiling are built in wood. The lateral door is flanked by a hemispherical baptismal pia and wardrobe, while at the top of the nave (behind the pulpit) is the door to the sacristy. A triumphal arch supported by pilasters supports the vaulted structure over wood cornices in the presbytery, dominated by a floor-size wooden crucifix and altar.
