= Convent of Caloura =

- Convento da Caloura
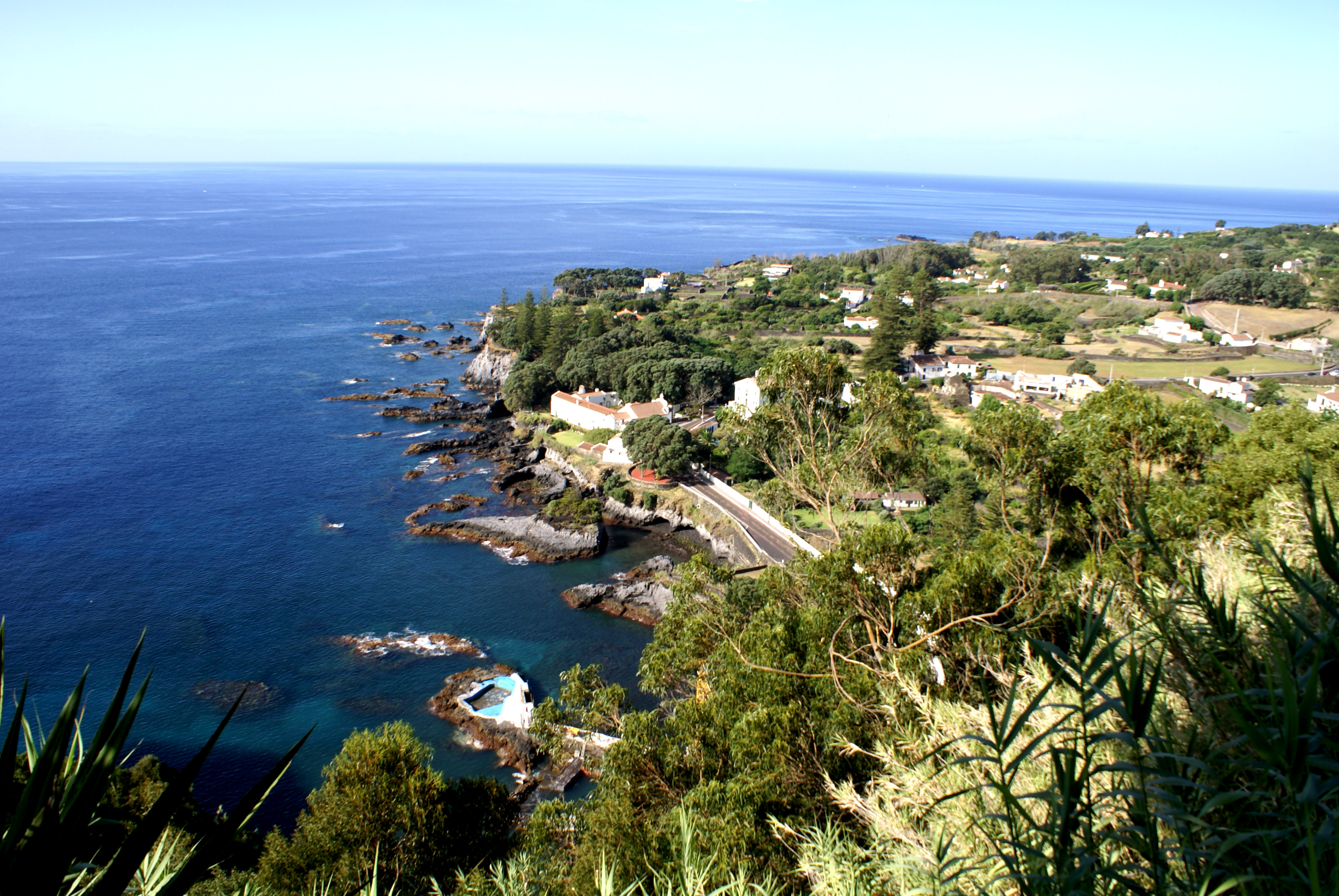
- The coastline community of Caloura, and centrally, the location of the Convent of the same name

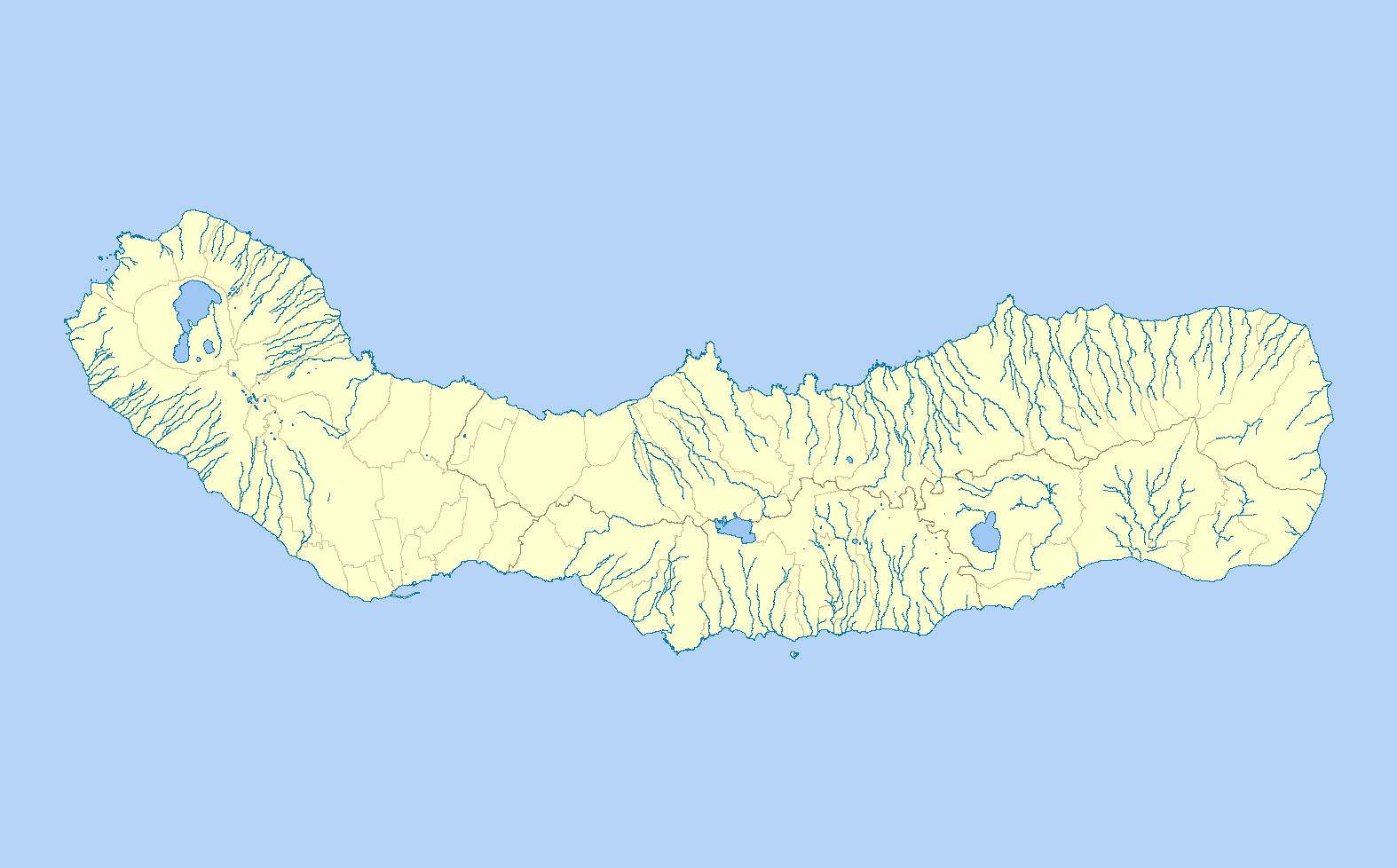
- Location within São Miguel

General information
- Type: Convent
- Location: Água de Pau, Lagoa, Portugal
- Coordinates: 37°42′43″N 25°29′48″W
- Opened: c. 1440
- Owner: Portuguese Republic

Technical details
- Material: Stone masonry

The Convent of Caloura (Portuguese: Convento da Caloura) is a Portuguese 16th-century convent located in the civil parish of Água de Pau, in the municipality of Lagoa, on the island of São Miguel in the archipelago of the Azores.

== History ==
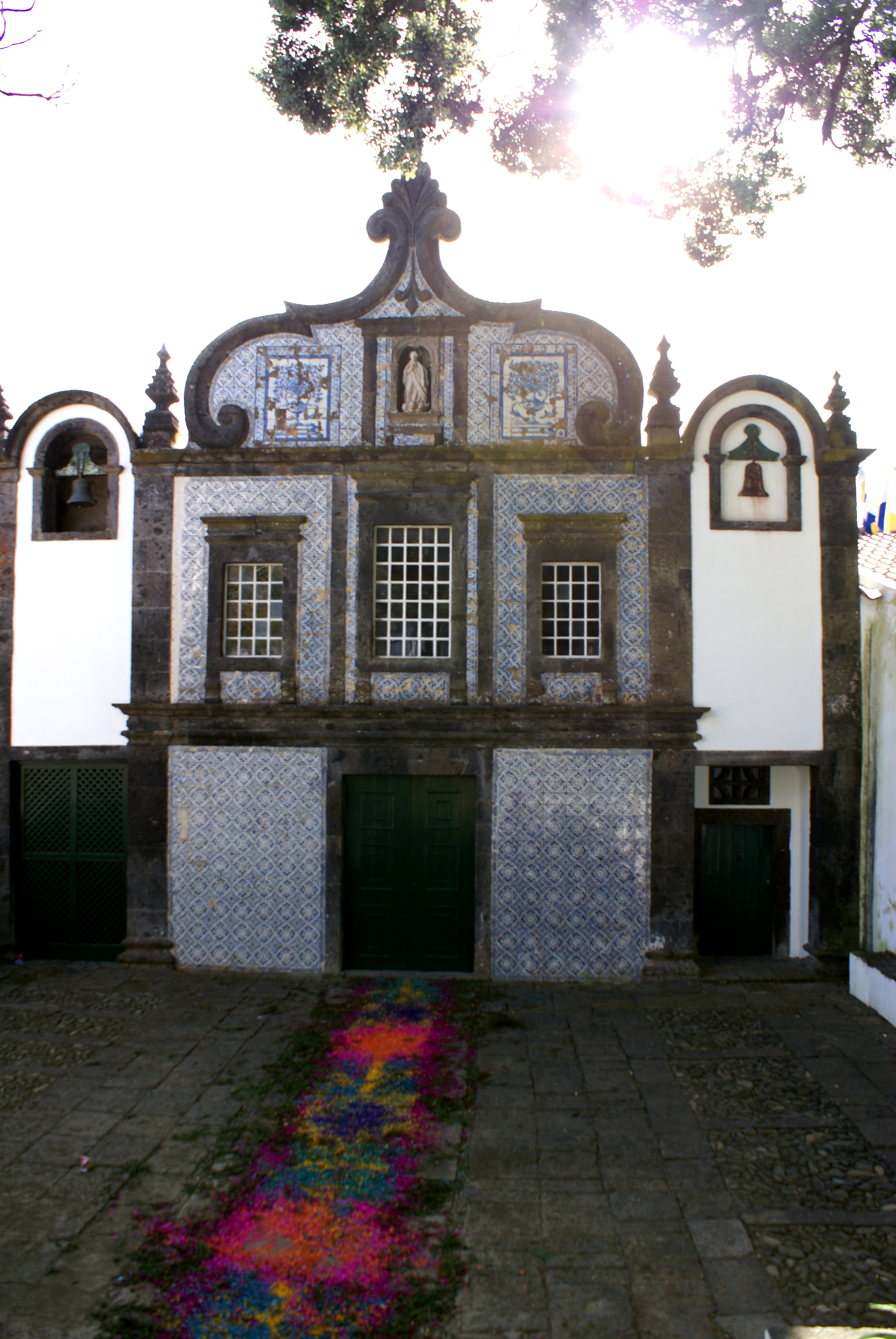
The front facade of the hermitage chapel with its polychromatic azulejo tile decorating its entrance

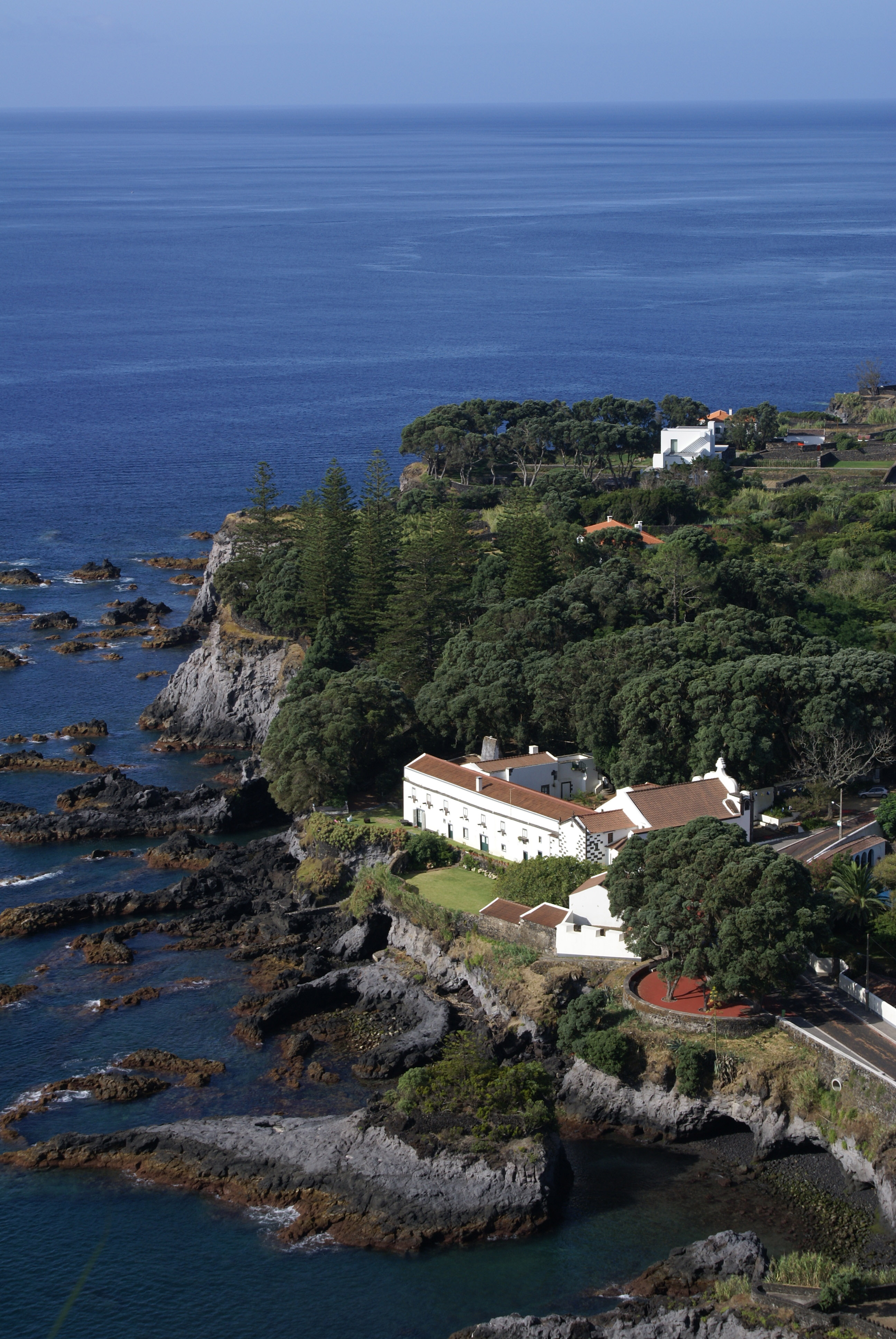
The Convent/Religious Shelter of Caloura located along the coast of the civil parish of Água de Pau

Around 1440, from the writings of friar Agostinho de Santa Maria, the construction of a small chapel to Nossa Senhora da Conceição (Our Lady of the Conception) was built by a hermit named Joanne Anes, on this site.

On 28 July 1515, King Manuel elevated the settlement of Água de Pau to the status of town, that consisted of half a league of land, de-annexing the territory from Vila Franca.

Father Gaspar Frutuoso noted that by 1522, the year of the cataclysmic earthquake and landslide in Vila Franca, there already existed a small chapel in the sheltered area, to the invocation of Nossa Senhora da Conceição: the coastal area escaped the cataclysm in Vila Franca. During these events, Jorge de Mota, a knight in the service of the Aviz, who lived in an estate with houses, orchards and chapel (dedicated to São João Baptista) recounted an episode when his daughter, a devout person, and her travelling companion, Isabel Afonso (a native of Braga or Ponte de Lima) had come to São Miguel with her husband Rodrigo Afonso and niece. They had planned to travel overnight to the hermitage of Santa Clara in Ponta Delgada, with Jorge de Mota's daughter's half-sisters (between four and nine). Along the road, sighting the chapel in the Vale de Cabaços (Caloura), they decided to remain there. Later, discovering where his daughters were, Jorge da Mota did what he could to convince the girls to return to his estate, but they reluctantly remained in the hermitage for the next six months, owing to the events of the earthquake and landslide in Vila Franca. Since the site only offered a small hermitage with sacristy, the town council of Vila Franca and settlers of Água de Pau constructed (with their meagre funds) a small house where the two lady's began to preach, taking up residence before Easter and adopting the names Maria de Jesus and Maria dos Anjos. Maria de Jesus wrote to her father, Jorge de Mota, asking that four of his daughters be allowed to remain, while the town council requested alms to support the women. After a month, two daughters of João de Arruda da Costa, from Vila Franca do Campo, also took up shelter on the site, followed by other devout women.

The island's third Captain-donatário, Rui Gonçalves da Câmara, then began to take care of the house, obtaining a papal bull and permission to erect a monastery, of which he and his wife, D. Filipa Coutinho, became patrons. Rui Gonçalves later moved, along with his family, to the area in order to be close to the religious sanctuary, contracting several public works.

On 16 July 1533, Pope Clement VIII determined the creation of a monastery, to Santo André in Vila Franca do Campo, housing 40 nuns, many of whom came from the same Vale de Cabaços.

It was these same nuns and staff that eventually abandoned the shelter on 23 April 1540 to found the monastery of Nossa Senhora da Esperança in Ponta Delgada, taking with them the image of Senhor Santo Cristo. This image had been offered by Pope Paul III to two of the sisters from Vale de Cabaços who had travelled to Rome to solicit the erection of the Ponta Delgada monastery.

The current chapel was constructed in the 17th century, and linked to the date inscribed on a panel representing Father Diogo da Madre de Deus, on the left side of the nave (1630). Yet, until 1632, the site remained deserted and only briefly occupied by a hermit. It was in August that several hermits appeared from Furnas, moving into the Vale de Cabaços. On the 20 November, under provision of D. João Pimenta de Abreu, then Bishop of Angra and the Azores, the hermits of Nossa Senhora da Consolação from the valley of Furnas, were authorized to construct homes alongside the hermitage of Nossa Senhora da Conceição (where they had already been housed temporarily). The hermits had abandoned their shelters in Furnas following a series of earthquakes and fires that occurred on 2 September 1630, and migrated out of the area.

By 1633, housing to the rear of the sacristy had been constructed, using wood and recycled elements from Furnas; they built a corridor and five cells that accommodated the brothers and two priests. The house of the original hermit and other dependencies were transformed into a pantry and refectory. Meanwhile, towards the coast they built a kitchen and other spaces. When completed, on 17 November 1633, the blessed sacrament from Furnas, which was saved from the fires, was placed on the altar of Nossa Senhora da Conceição; flanking the tabernacle, the clergy placed the images of Nossa Senhora da Conceição (from the hermitage) and Nossa Senhora da Consolação (also brought from the Furnas Valley). Meanwhile, the brothers constructed two niches over the altar, and placed images of Saint Peter and Mary Magadalene, while in smaller niches other saints and crucifixes were placed. The following year the body of Father Diogo da Madre de Deus of Furnas was brought from the Vale de Cabaços, and buried in a tomb within the chancel. But, by the end of December, the chamber was reopened and the bones were deposited in a stone box and placed to the right of the altar's credenza. In 1635, an image of Nossa Senhora das Dores was already located in the presbytery.

In August 1650, Father Manuel da Anunciação ordered the opening of five tombs, including his own, in the presbytery, between the lateral retables. The following year, on 17 February 1651, Father Manuel da Anunciação died, and a year later, his bones were moved to the credenza in the altar.

In 1659, the clergyman João Roiz Vitória provided funding for a few public works, with the acquisition of bunks and gratings, a silver custodio and some ornaments.

D. Manuel Luís Baltazar da Câmara, 1st Count of Riberia Grande, and 8th Donatary-Captain of São Miguel visited in September 1664, along with his wife. He ordered new work on the cell of Father Assunção, providing funding and materials, as well as extending the sacristy, building a high-choir, a new group of dormitories with four cells, and at the end, an oratory with crucifix. It could have been at this time that the work on the azulejos in the sub-choir was completed, while work on the dormitories was finished at the end of Christmas. The Count later improved the housing for the Blessed Sacrament, which was in a bad state. On the feast day of Nossa Senhora da Consolação (Our Lady of Consolation), the image (which was transferred from Furnas) was moved to the left lateral altar on 8 September 1664.

On 14 May 1665, Dr. Manuel Álvares Cabral visited the convent, resulting in the restoration of the older dormitories. The same document indicates that on 16 September, there were ten hermits (six of whom were priests) making a maximum of 13 at the institution; it was prohibited to receive hermits with only the approval of the ouvidor, requiring the intervention and authorization of the bishop. On 11 August 1674, Bishop Lourenço de Castro visited, ordering the remodelling of the building. The bishop also lamented the lack of priests, and the rumour spread that he desired that Franciscans occupy the spaces to allow older priests a place for recreation and retreat, which caused consternation.

In December 1684, a niche in stone was built by Jean Fauger (known as João Faugero), a native of Agen in France, who lived in a small space within the grounds, and who worked as a sculptor.

In 1688, Captain Bartlomeu de Frias Coutinho, expressed his intention to enter the convent, ordering the construction of three rooms in the last dormitory of the western wing, for his spaces. On 23 February, a new image of the Virgin Mary was installed in the front niche, executed by Fauger again, and in white marble which was specially ordered by his son, Father João da Madre de Deus, who ministered in the Recolhimento (religious shelter). The master sculptor also built various columns, pedestals, angels, cherubs and images (including Nossa Senhora da Piedade and São José). The artisan died in 1693, before concluding the altar for the image of Nossa Senhora da Consolação. While a resident at the convent, Father Bartolomeu de Frias Coutinho worked on improving the roads to the chapel in 1695 and decorated the sepulchre tomb, during the Paschal Triduum of Holy Week, and other small works. Upon his death in 1696, Bartolomeu's testament left all his worldly possessions to the shelter, including his books and monies, to be used to create a silver censer and chains (with leftover funds).

In 1704, Fathers Ministro and João de Passos solicited from the Bishop authority for students to live in the shelter, in order for them to continue their studies and practice Latin. Later that year the Bishop issued his approval. Bishop D. António Vieira Leitão then visited the convent on 24 January 1707. At the altar of Nossa Senhora da Consolação he requested an annual mass and three masses at Christmas, leaving four moios of wheat in Água de Pau. In addition, the obedientiary contracted new statutes, similar to those created in Furnas in 1619.

Just after he left, the dormitories and cells of the eastern wing were ruined and secured with props. Domingos Roiz, in exchange for permission to be received as a laymen, donated 200$000 reis for the project. However Domingos Roiz was expelled in 1709 for undignified comportment, and the remainder of his contribution (67$470 reis) was devolved. In the following years there were new projects in the convent, including: azulejos (1725); the doorway in the oblique corridor alongside the chapel (1731); installation of new washroom (1733); new azulejo tile in the nave, construction of a cistern (with a 300$000 réis contribution from the government), reconstruction of the dormitory, kitchen and workshops (1737).

On 22 May 1760, the testament of Adriano da Silva left his possessions to the shelter.

Figurative panels were installed over the central panel of the triumphal arch in 1779, under the orders of Father Pedro Paulo de Vasconcelos, vice-vicar in the Church of Nossa Senhora dos Anjos in Água de Pau, becoming known as Father Saint Paul.

On 17 May 1832, in a decree signed in Ponta Delgada by Regent Peter, Minister and Secretary of State for Ecclesiastical Affairs, and Minister of Justice, José Xavier Mouzinho da Silveira, the shelter of Caloura was closed and Church secularized, with its possessions and properties incorporated into the national treasury. On 11 July Father José Bento Rodovalho, Minister of Shelters, order the immediate inventory of the Church's possessions, decorations and tools; these possessions included silverware, ampoule, two chalices; a pair of cruets with dishes; three panels; ten images of various invocations and heights with silver-leaf; four silver crowns or various sizes; an image of Christ; two cabinets; and a small bell from the belfry. The hermits were expelled from the convent, and the Chapel of Nossa Senhora da Conceição fell under the vigilance of the local authority of the parish of Nossa Senhora dos Anjos of Água de Pau.

The Junta Geral then decided to transform the spaces into a lazaretto, in their minutes dated 27 July 1837, but these plans were never realized. Then on 11 February 1846, the Parish Junta deliberated the transfer of the decorations and possessions of the hermitage into the care of José Maria da Silveira, a resident of Lagoa. The local Junta also continued to deliberate on other artifacts in the intervening years: on 21 October 1849, the board discussed the transfer of two artifacts and the image of Saint Benedict to the parish president; on 30 March 1851, the Junta requested that the Civil Governor impede the transfer of an image of the Lord of Patience (from the hermitage) since it was needed in the cemetery; on 9 March 1853, they requested the Governor Civil allow them to reuse the slabs around the building for the cemetery.

Ultimately, on 6 June 1854, the hermitage, shelter and surrounding property were sold to António Manuel de Medeiros da Costa Canto e Albuquerque, 2nd Baron and 1st Viscount of Laranjeiras. The Junta Geral authorized, on 20 February 1859, the payment of 16$570 réis to guard the southern part of the hermitage. Later, with the death of António Manuel de Medeiros, the group of properties passed on to his son António d'Albuquerque, then his daughter D. Cecília de Medeiros Albuquerque Jácome Corrêa, who married Thomaz Ivens Jácome Corrêa.

The building was semi-abandoned in the 20th century, resulting in the rebuilding of the presbytery and interior, owing to the difficulty in restoring the spaces which had degraded significantly. The work was completed in 1940 by Guilherme Porfírio Cabral (who worked on the chapel) and carpenter António Feliciano de Melo. Some time around 1946 new azulejos were installed in the northern part of the buildings (from signed panels).

Some work continued in the 1970s, especially by carpenter José da Silva. Similarly, in 1979, there were new projects to restore the convent: David Rodrigues Arruda worked as plasterer and painter; António Feliciano de Melo retouched the nave; João Jacinto Teves was responsible for masonry work on the site; the chapel was electrified by electrician Manuel Cabral de Madeiros Sardinha (Ponta Delgada).

On 10 June 2008, the Regional Government of the Azores classified the Convent of Caloura as a Property of Public Interest, due to its importance in being the original focus of the celebrations associated with Senhor Santo Cristo dos Milagres.

== Architecture ==
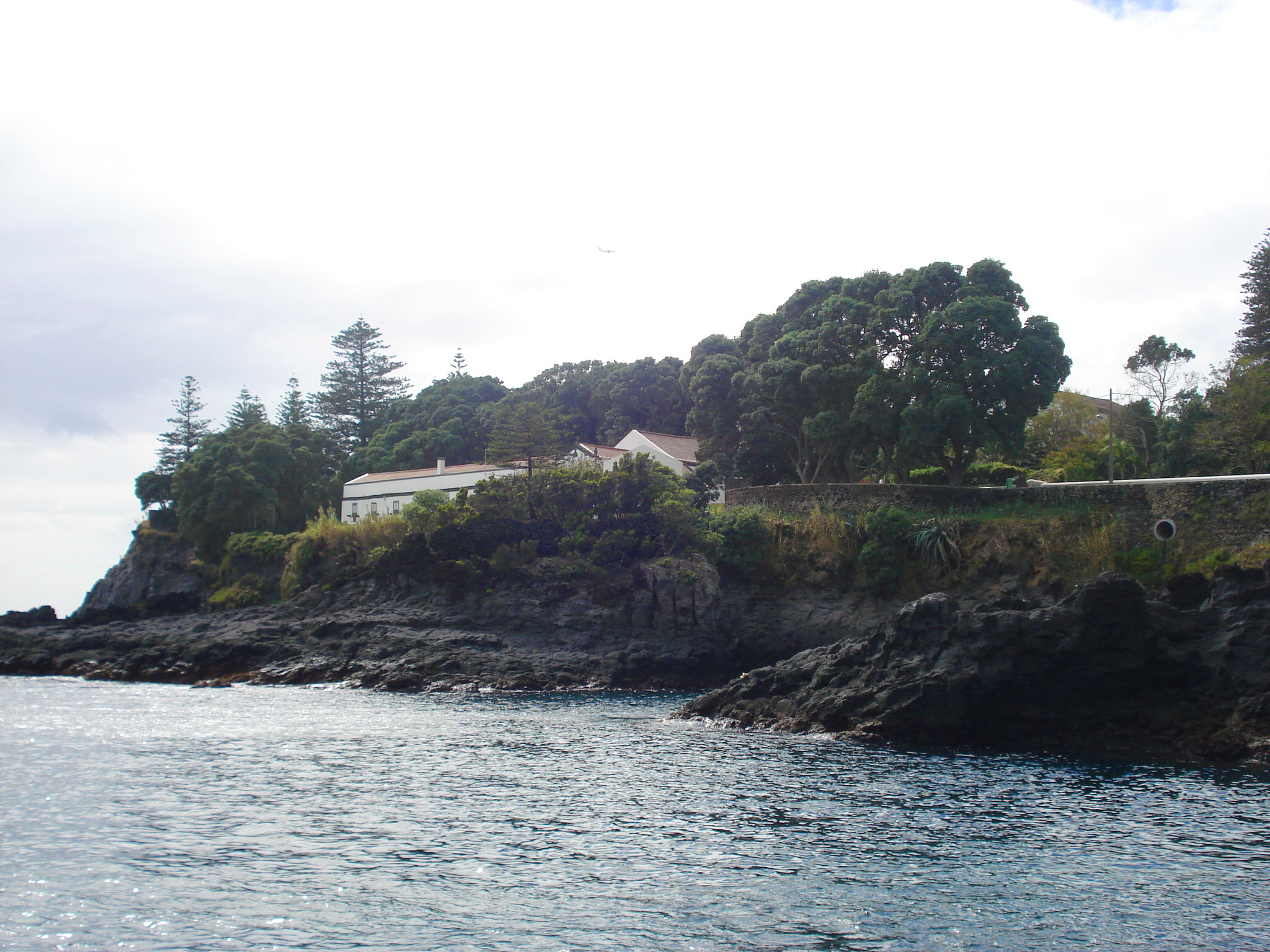
A glimpse of the Convent from the coastline of Caloura

The convent and chapel are located on the urban fringe, along the southern coast of the municipality of Lagoa, in the civil parish of Água de Pau. Specifically, they are situated in the valley of Caloura, also referred to as the Cabaços Valley, near the port, above the cliffs and adapted into the slopes of the land. Alongside the building is the main public avenue and pedestrian walkway. The chapel's rectangular courtyard lies below the level of the roadway and walkway and is accessed by a short staircase flanked by plants, bordered by low walls capped by stonework. The courtyard is covered with three rows of slabs, forming geometric designs. The spaces are fenced in to the west by two gates, accessing the area to the north of the chapel where the garage is constructed over an operating bulwark. The irregularly U-shaped plan consists of an open area to the west and the church to the north. The building has several articulated spaces with a tiled roof, plastered and painted in white, with counter grey accents.

=== Church ===
The rectangular church comprises a nave and presbytery flanked by lateral corridors, with a sacristy to the left of the altar. The main facade faces west, defined by Tuscan pilasters crowned with pyramidal pinnacles over parallel-elliptical plinths. The central wall along the nave is decorated in blue and white azulejo tiles. This two-storey high facade and azulejo wall are broken by a frieze and cornices over finial cut-breaks, forming lateral volutes, which are topped by a vegetal-shaped frontispiece crowned by a rectangular Latin cross. At the centre of the frontispiece is a niche formed from semi-circular conch shell and decorated lateral frame. The niche is framed by a rectangular border and surmounted by an inverted fleur-de-lis motif. The first basalt image installed in the niche was later sold to the priests of the Society of Jesus, and later installed in the niche of a house of Fajã de Cima. On the first floor is a simple framed door and on the second-floor three rectangular windows framed by false corbels and terminated in a frieze and cornice. The central window is larger and flanked by two vertical friezes. The lateral panels are plastered and painted in white, corresponding to the northern bell-tower, and a false bell-tower to the south, marked by a belfry in mortar, painted to imitate stonework. Three doorways access the building: the larger central door occupies the main facade, with two lateral doorways underneath the real and false belfrys. The rectangular false belfry door is inset from the facade, and surmounted by a rectangular oculus, while the lattice-door under the real belfry (with similar rectangular frame) sits flush on the facade.

==== Interior ====
The interior of the chapel is decorated in a pattern of azulejo tile, while the stone spans are painted in faux-marble. On either side of the lateral walls are two built-in confessionals, with doors painted in red and decorative elements in gold, as well as faux marble interiors, framed in shells. The high-choir with balustrade is painted in blue and red, with the area of the sub-choir marked by lattice in dark wood, painted orange, with acanthus in gold-leaf and cartouche with a flaming heart pierced by arrows.

To the right of the altar, is the large circular-base baptismal font. To the left of the altar is the rectangular pulpit on two cantilevers, decorated with a diamond anthemion surrounded by lanceolate, with access to the straight door lintel. The pulpit is surmounted by carved canopy to the level of the roof cornice, decorated with the dove of the Holy Spirit inserted in a circular cartouche.

The presbytery is delineated by a lattice balustrade. The triumphal arch is decorated in red painted leaf, surmounted by a crown and flanked by two lateral retables in gold-leaf at angles. Near the retables are doors to the lateral corridors. Over the cornice is the roof-line of the nave supported by rounded wooden beams, painted with phytomorphic friezes and cartouches, the centre large and cut, with marine symbols and inscriptions.

The presbytery and altarpiece have polychromatic red and gold tile, in a rectangular alignment defined by six columns, decorated with birds and small fish over high plinths decorated with acanthus and shells. Corinthian capitals extend toward the attic in archivolts, united by radii with a pelican cartouche. The altarpiece is surmounted by crockets at angles. Through a rounded archway the centre opens to a gallery, decorated in acanthus, while to the interior there are several panels painted in red, sheltering a three-tier throne, decorated in acanthus up to the top where angels can be seen.

The rostrum is enclosed with tile, representing the Descida da Cruz (Descent from the Cross). The faceted sacristy is decorated with hybrid figures in beards and the door decorated with a figure of Christ the Redeemer.

The parallelepiped altar, in marble with diamond cross, consists of covered wood, plastered and painted in red, forming panels of acanthus in gold, interspersed with flowers and gold relief.

From the presbytery two lateral painted doors provide access to the sacristy and the archive room (to the right and left of the altar, respectively). The sacristy is small and its walls painted white, with a painted chest, topped with painted backrest (laterally and frontally decorated with floral motifs and drapery). In the archive room, to the left, is a wardrobe (interiorly divided in two) with painted motifs, while between pillars is a rectangular lavabo with an arch of ashlar and double frieze below. The lavabo has a convex base and faucett, and is decorated with florians and surmounted by pinnacles.

=== Recolhimento ===
The recolhimento (or shelter house) is an irregular U-shaped building, with a wing parallel to the church. The two-storey edifice is built of friezes, corners and frames in grey stone; the eastern facade is surmounted by cornice and marked by rectilinear veins, corresponding to the doors and windows on the ground floor, the larger door and windows.

==== Interior ====
The interior walls are plastered and painted in white. The wings have various dependencies with a corridor on the northern wing and another southern corridor of the chapel, as well as corridors in the other wings that front the gardens. In the eastern corridor are two niches, one between the archive door and staircase, and the other following the last room on the other side of the corridor. In the extreme south is the largest of the spaces, which was likely the referred grand visitors house. At the end of the eastern corridor, towards the west, is a doorway with windows that open onto the exterior and the property's annexes. Over this corridor is a balcony and spaces (orlop), accessible from the garden staircase.

These concierge spaces provide access through the front and arches and doorways to the kitchen and other dependencies, such as the cellar and dining room. The pantry, accessed from an arched doorway, has a monolithic stone table and a spring from the old cistern. The kitchen, with sink and stone table, is surmounted by a long wooden shelf with chimney, while a long wine cellar is created from a space consisting of six arches.

To western part of the courtyard is an iron gate flanked by azulejo tiles (with a heart), to the left, and a small water fountain surmounted by azulejo tile, to the right. To the northeast of the hermitage is another gate, that follows the roadway, surmounted by a cross (dated 1731). A large portion of the courtyard is gardened and includes two pools populated with fish.

Alongside the kitchen is the washing-room, a small washroom and two showers for use during summer months.

==== Chapel ====
The chapel is to the invocation of Our Lady of the Conception (Portuguese: Nossa Senhora da Conceição), although it is commonly referred to as Our Lady of Sorrows (Portuguese: Nossa Senhora das Dores). Initially, the chapel was the location of two festivals, one on 8 September and the other 8 December, in honour of Nossa Senhora da Consolação (Our Lady of the Consolation) and Nossa Senhora da Conceição, respectively. With time, the festival to Our Lady of the Conception began to occur in the parish of Água de Pau (where it was the patron of the community, resulting in processions and festivals in her honour). Due to instability during that era, it was difficult to organize the procession, and it was moved to the 15 August, in honour of Our Lady of Angels (Portuguese: Nossa Senhora dos Anjos). The hermitage, therefore, began to celebrate festivities in honour of Our Lady of Sorrows on the third Sunday in September.
