= Santa Bárbara (Vila do Porto) =

- Civil parish
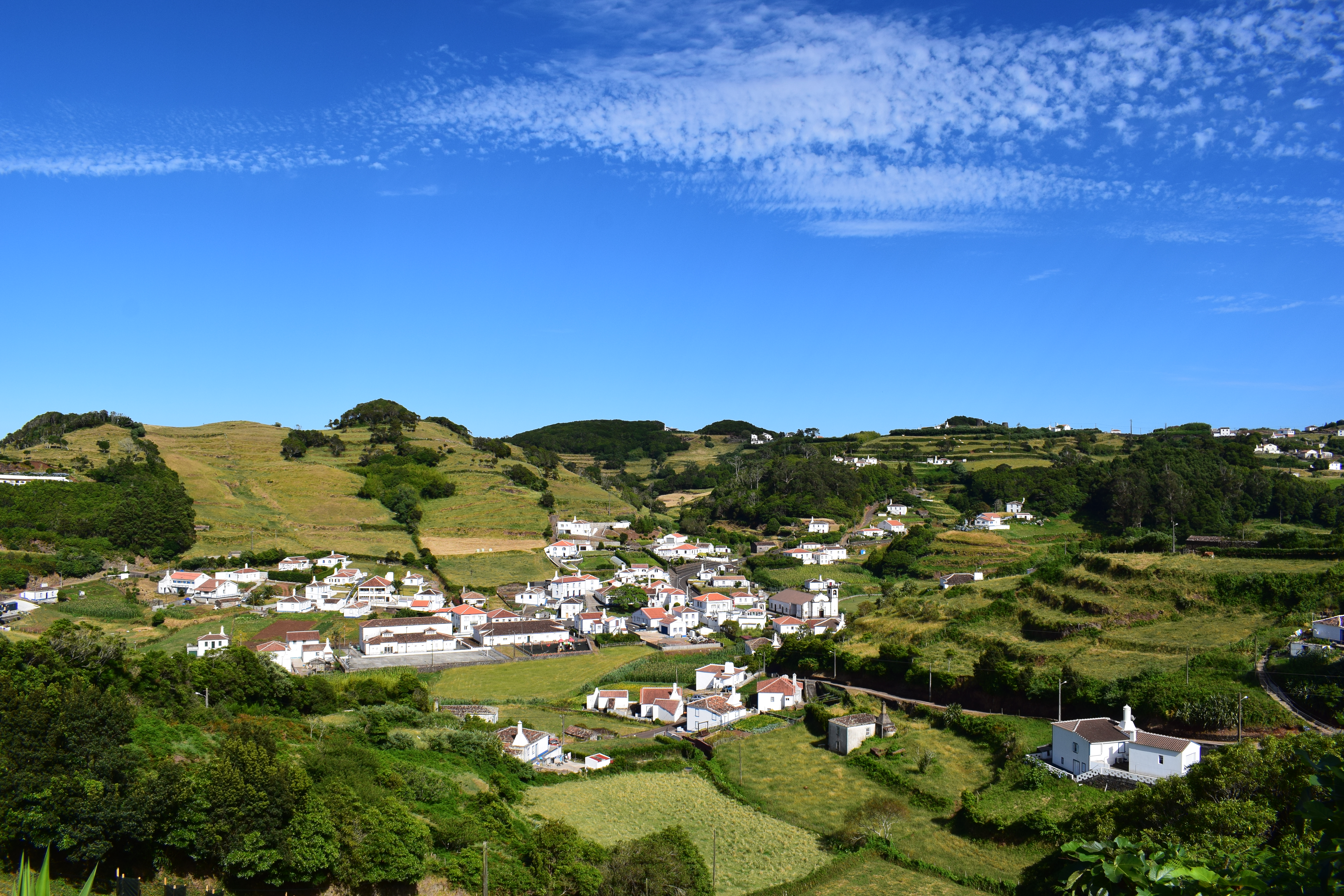
- The main village of Santa Bárbara located in the valley of the same name, in the interior of the island of Santa Maria

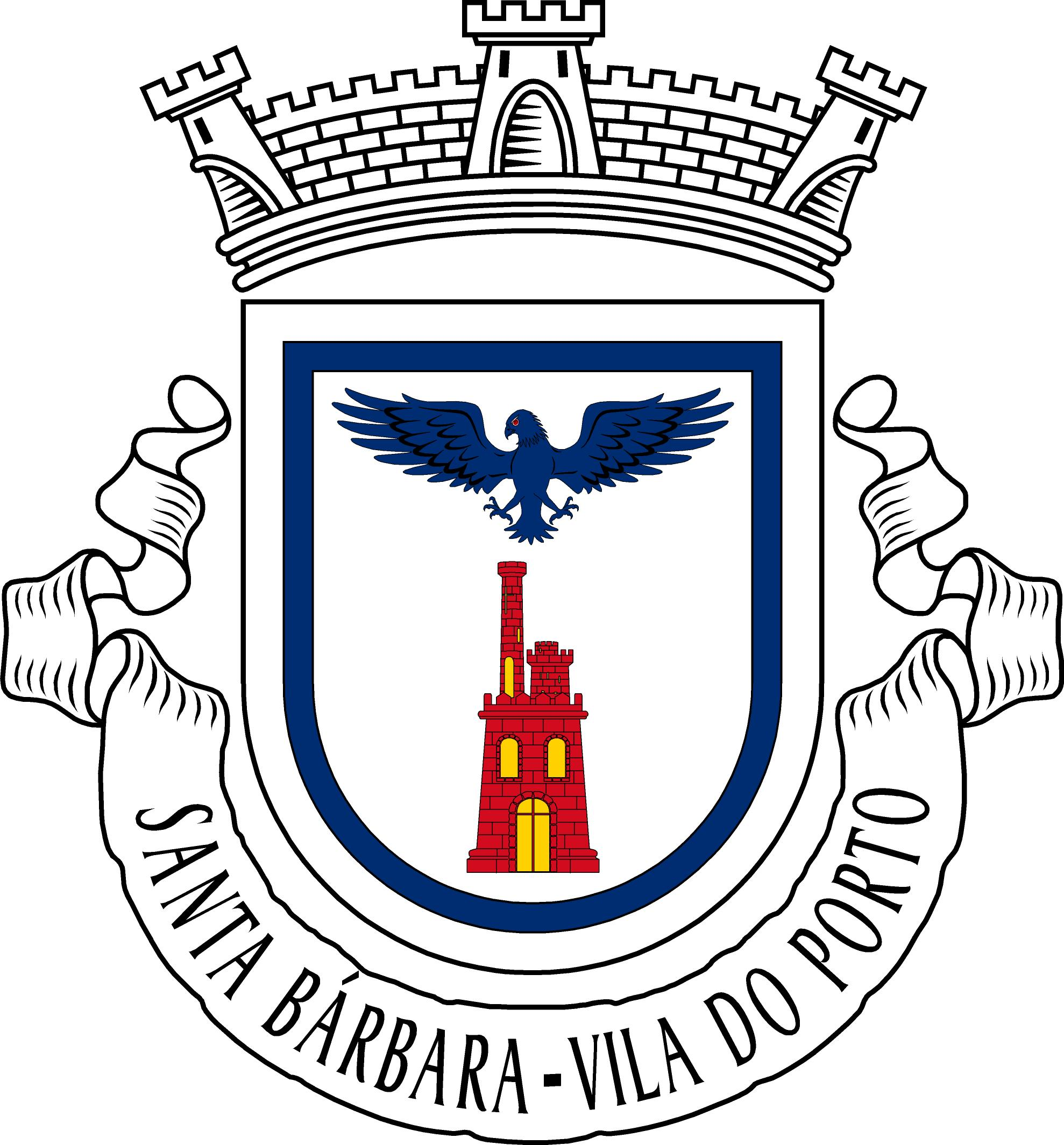
- Flag

- Location of the civil parish of Santa Bárbara within the municipality of Vila do Porto
- Coordinates: 36°59′5″N 25°4′6″W
- Country: Portugal
- Auton. region: Azores
- Island: Santa Maria
- Municipality: Vila do Porto
- Established: Settlement: 16th century

Area
  - Total: 15.27 km^{2} (5.90 sq mi)
- Elevation: 220 m (720 ft)

Population (2021)
  - Total: 370
  - Density: 24/km^{2} (63/sq mi)
- Time zone: UTC−01:00 (AZOT)
  - Summer (DST): UTC+00:00 (AZOST)
- Postal code: 9580-115
- Area code: 292
- Patron: Santa Bárbara
- Website: www.jfsantabarbara.com

Santa Bárbara (Portuguese pronunciation: [ˈsɐ̃tɐ ˈβaɾβɐɾɐ]) is a civil parish in the municipality of Vila do Porto in the Portuguese autonomous region of Azores. The population in 2011 was 405, in an area of 15.27 km^{2}.

== History ==
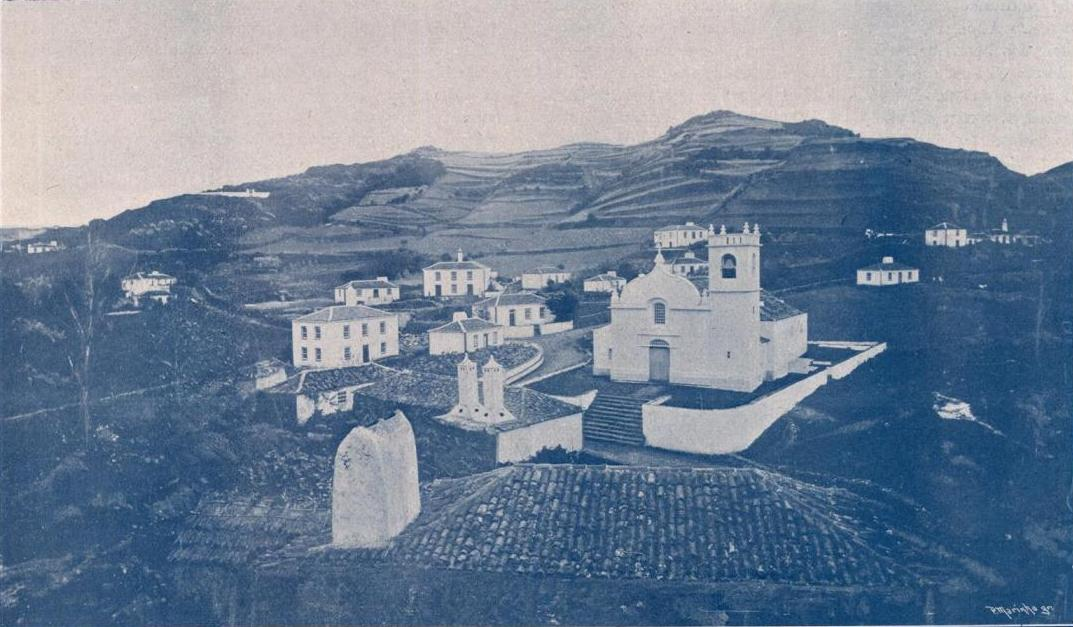
A vintage photograph of the valley of Santa Bárbara circa 1903, when there were less homes in the valley

The settlement of this place originated sometime in the 16th century, since around 1584, the Bay of São Lourenço was identified as La Prainha, later referred to as the Villa da prainha. The settlers of Santo Espírito and Santa Bárbara originated from the rural areas of the Algarve and Baixo Alentejo, and can be verified from the topological influences in the rural homes and villages of the region.

As Gaspar Frutuoso noted: "The other [parish], of Santa Bárbara, is within the sierra, of the same band from Norte, a league and a half from Vila [do Porto]." Frutuoso went on to explain:

"...it is a parish of 40 homes and 110 confessional souls, more or less; where the first curate Bartolomeu Luís, native of the island of São Miguel, of who I did not confirm the church, because he wanted a benefit in the Vila. And Amador Fernandes, native of this same island, was the first confirm vicar; the second was, José Gonçalves, who renounced the possession; and the present is vicar Manuel Fernandes, native of the same island of Santa Maria; in which parish live very honourable people."

The inhabitant settlements of the region formed from the distribution of its settlers, who occupied various places, some separated by large distances. Many of these points were connected by dirt roads, that were not easy to travel throughout the year, and the area obtained the non-ephemeral Terras do Nordeste (Lands of the Northeast).

The description of the parish in the Álbum Açoriano (1903) refers to the parish as the poorest on the island, whose inhabitants are involved in the cultivation of wheat, potato and raising of cattle.

Gaspar Frutuoso noted that the history of these lands were influenced by its settlers and parishioners, including Father Ângelo Ângelo Soares da Câmara, who was responsible for the supporting the nascent communities, sacrificing his religious benefits to the impoverished in the region. He was active in the construction of a potable water supply, including the fountain near the church, a new cemetery and other various improvements throughout his curate.

Owing to the hardships associated with a difficult physical relief and climate, many of the early poor suffered from a lack of foodstuffs. The region was dependent on the water mills to mill flour, and during the summer a lack of water meant that no milling occurred. Some innovative farmers constructed local mills, powered by oxen, horse or donkey that allowed them to mill grain or corn for their respective families or friends. The construction of windmills, particularly at Arrebentão permitted continuous milling, but dependent on wind.

The parish ceded, between 1965 and 31 December 1977, lands in Norte for a LORAN station (the LORAN Station of Santa Maria), that functioned as a pole for the Atlantic and coordinated long-range navigation with the stations in Flores and Porto Santo. At its time, the complex was built and operated by French military, who built a community that included not only the operational facilities, but residences and homes for its functionaries, that included streets, sports field and green-spaces. Following its closer, security was maintained until the middle of the 1980s, when it was abandoned, scavenged by locals and left in ruins.

The potable water distribution was inaugurated in the parish on 11 December 1966, while access to potable water only filtered to the rest of the communities by 1983.

== Geography ==
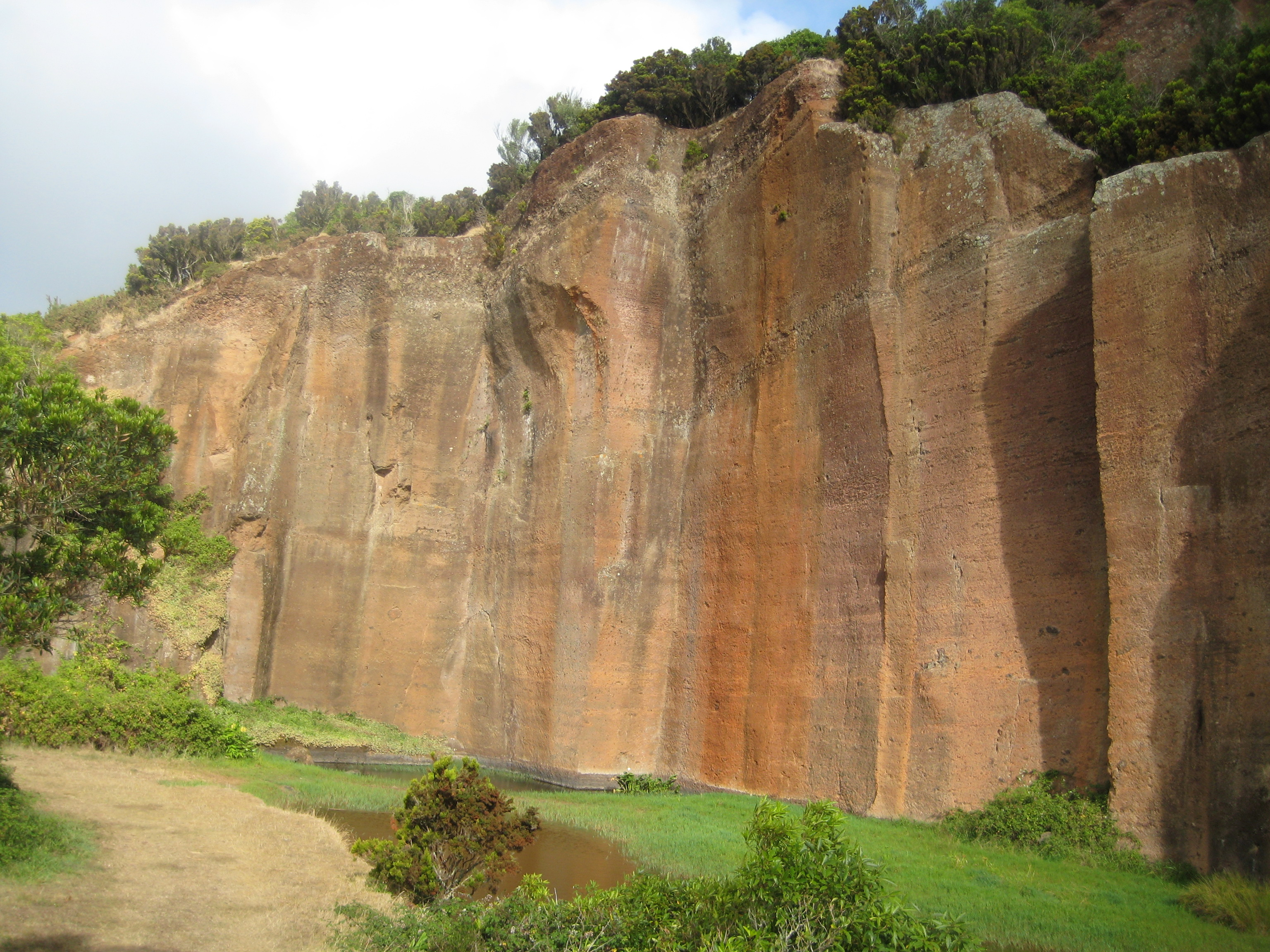
The red basaltic geological formation of Poço da Pedreira mined for the red stone

The parish is located between the Ribeira do Salto and Ponta do Norte, with its main nucleus along a valley, in an area of southeastern Santa Maria, about 12 kilometres (7.5 mi) from the seat of Vila do Porto. Its geographic location on the island has resulted in it being referred to as the Sol Nascente parish (roughly, the sun dawn), owing to it being the first of the archipelagos of the Azores to glimpse the dawn (approximately 24 minutes earlier than the most distant community, on the island of Flores). With an area of approximately 15.34 square kilometres (5.92 mi^{2}), Santa Bárbara is bounded in the north and east by the sea, south by the neighboring parish of Santo Espírito and west by São Pedro and Almagreira.

=== Physical geography ===
Santa Maria is one of the more important geomorphological islands of the archipelago, owing to its varied geological sedimentary, calcium and marine fossil deposits, along with basaltic formations.

The area of Santa Bárbara consists of geological basaltic stone and escoria, transformed by pressures and weathering. In the region of Arrebentão is a former quarry pit, where these deposits were excavated and sold, explaining the vertical slopes of the quarry. From its geological record and level of alteration, the pyroclasts are consolidated and took on the red-tinged colour, giving the name of the site: Pico Vermelho.

The highest points in the parish include the peak of Pico Alto 587 metres (1,926 ft), shared between the central parishes of the island, and Pico do Penedo, the heightest point totally within the parish of Santa Bárbara at an elevation of 423 metres (1,388 ft).

=== Human geography ===
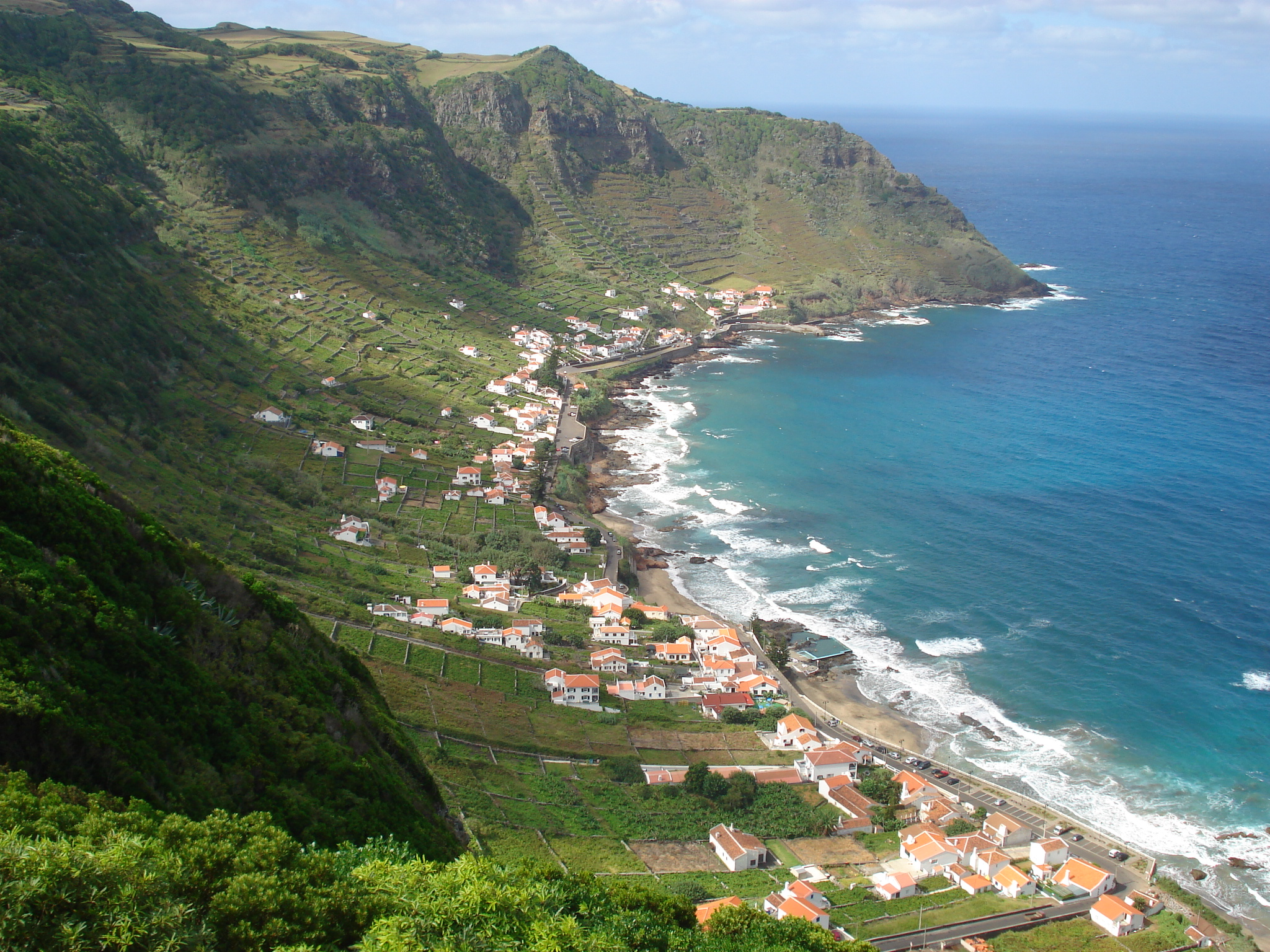
The scenic landscape of the former caldera, village and bay of São Lourenço

Its accented relief of hills and valleys resulted in isolated communities of less than 100 inhabitants, with the largest being the seat of the parish (Santa Bárbara). Other communities in this parish included the localities of Termo da Igreja, Lagos, Lagoinhas, Feteiras de Santa Bárbara, Pocilgas, Pico do Penedo, Poço Grande, Boavista, Forno, Fajã de São Lourenço, Barreiro, Norte, Arrebentão and Tagarete, all located along the regional E.R. 1-1ª roadway that circles the island.

Apart from the socio-administrative centre of Santa Bárbara, the civil parish is identifiable by the Bay of São Lourenço, and locality of São Lourenço along the eastern coast. This landscape was formed from a partially destroyed caldera, resulting in its concave form oriented towards the sea, with terraces constructed along its exterior walls to support agriculture. The coastal area was built by successive generations, originally establishing residences at the water's edge, but successively branching into the interior. The concave coastal area includes several tourist-oriented villas, wine cellars and summer cottages used by locals throughout the year, in addition to the native community.

== Economy ==
Agriculture is the primary resource in the parish, supplemented by some people involved in fishery, commerce and tourism.

São Lourenço is the tourist centre of activities in the civil parish, owing to its ocean frontage, scenic vista and microclimate. The neighbouring community of Maia, is sometimes confused by tourists, owing to their similar access and coastal position. The local microclimate of this region was also responsible for the growth of an early wine-making industry, highlighted by the terraced parcels located along the clifftops overlooking the residential and tourist cottages.

== Architecture ==
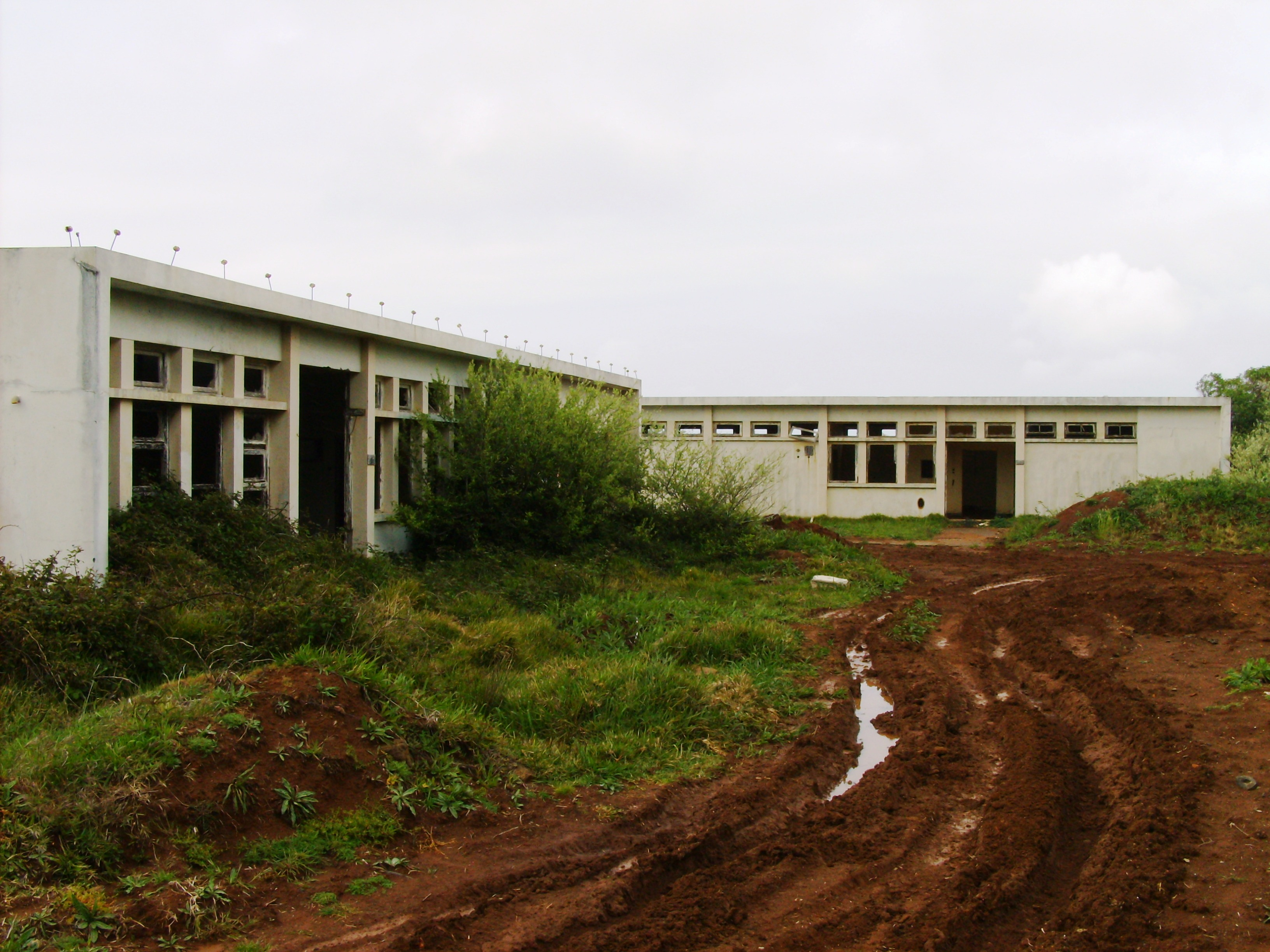
The generator and mechanical buildings of the abandoned LORAN Station in Norte

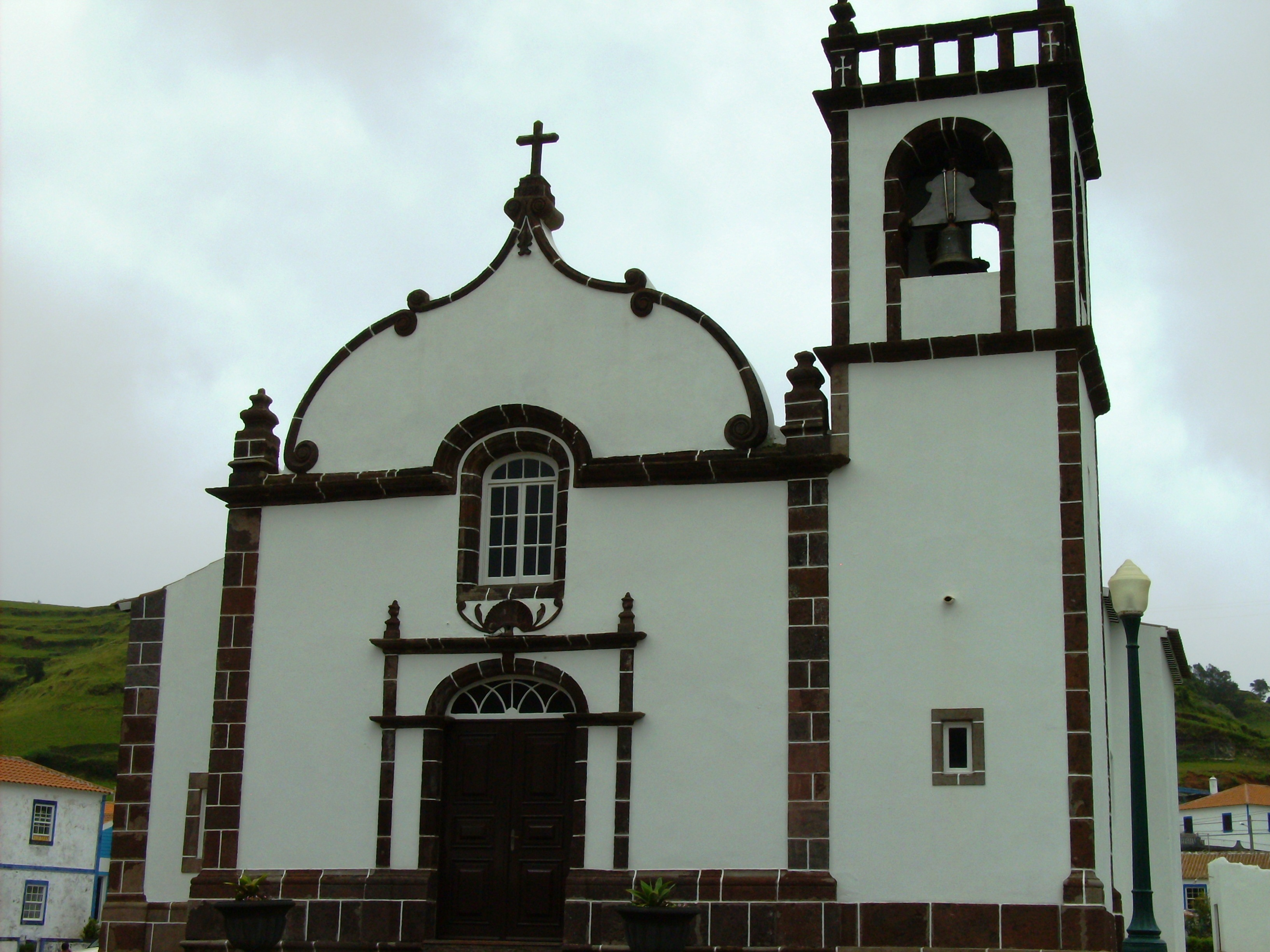
The parochial Church of Santa Bárbara constructed in the 17th century, and centre of parish activity

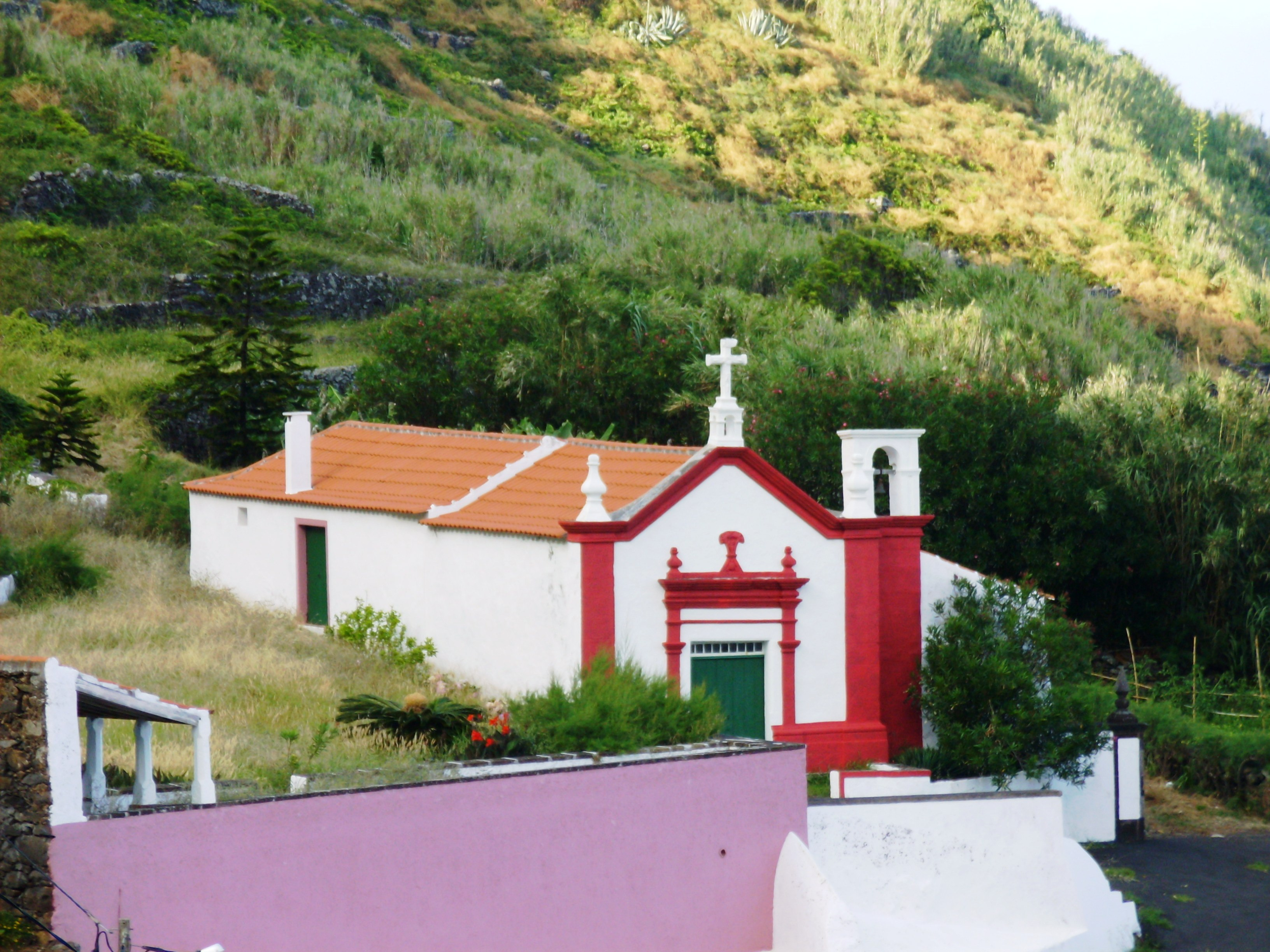
The 17th or 18th century hermitage dedicated to Jesus, Mary and Joseph in São Lourenço

- Bridge of Boavista (Portuguese: Ponte de Boavista), a simple single-arch bridge dating to the 19th century, in the area of Boavista;
- Church Bridge of Santa Bárbara (Portuguese: Ponte-Igreja), the simple single-arch bridge was constructed in 1881, and links the area of Pocilgas to Termo da Igreja;
- Windmills of Arrebentão (Portuguese: Moinhos de vento de Arrebentão), the remains of the bases of two windmills utilized during the 19th century for millings of flower, classified as regional Property of Public Interest;

=== Military ===
- Casemates of Pico Alto (Portuguese: Casamatas do Pico Alto), a military complex consisting of three casemates built after the Second World War, of reinforced concrete, embedded into the slope, along the roadway that borders Pico Alto. The visible feature of these military bunkers consist of facades and entrance-ways into the casemates.
- Fort of São Lourenço (Portuguese: Forte da Baia de São Lourenço)
- LORAN Station of Santa Maria (Portuguese: Estação LORAN de Santa Maria), the long-range navigation station was constructed by the French after the Second World War, but abandoned in the 1980s, following its deactivation. The site, which not only includes the operations buildings, but residences and game fields are in ruins, scavenged by locals following the removal of security personnel in the mid-1980s;

=== Religious ===
- Church of Santa Bárbara (Portuguese: Igreja Paroquial de Santa Bárbara/Igreja de Santa Bárbara), the parochial church of Santa Bárbara dates to the middle of the 17th century, consisting of single-nave and bell-tower structure, marked by main presbytery and lateral angular chapels;
- Hermitage of Jesus, Maria e José (Portuguese: Ermida de Jesus, Maria e José), located on the northern edge of São Lourenço, the hermitage dates to the 17th or early 18th century, and was one of the first retreats on the island, and part of a former estate;
- Hermitage of Nossa Senhora do Desterro (Portuguese: Ermida de Nossa Senhora do Desterro)
- Hermitage of Nossa Senhora de Lurdes (Portuguese: Ermida de Nossa Senhora de Lurdes), the isolated single-nave hermitage in the region of Norte, is known for its main altar, constructed using volcanic stone, resembling the grotto where the Marian apparition occurred in Lourdes, France;
- Hermitage of São Lourenço (Portuguese: Ermida de São Lourenço)
- Império of the Holy Spirit of Santa Bárbara (Portuguese: Império do Espírito Santo de Santa Bárbara/Treatro do Espírito Santo de Santa Bárbara), the small, unimposing treatro or chapel dedicated to the annual celebrations of the Cult of the Holy Spirit, was dedicated in 1900, to replace existent temporary structures. The simple one-room space includes altar and space for the artifacts of the religious and ceremonial processions held throughout the period following Pentecost Sunday;
