= Água de Pau =

- Civil parish
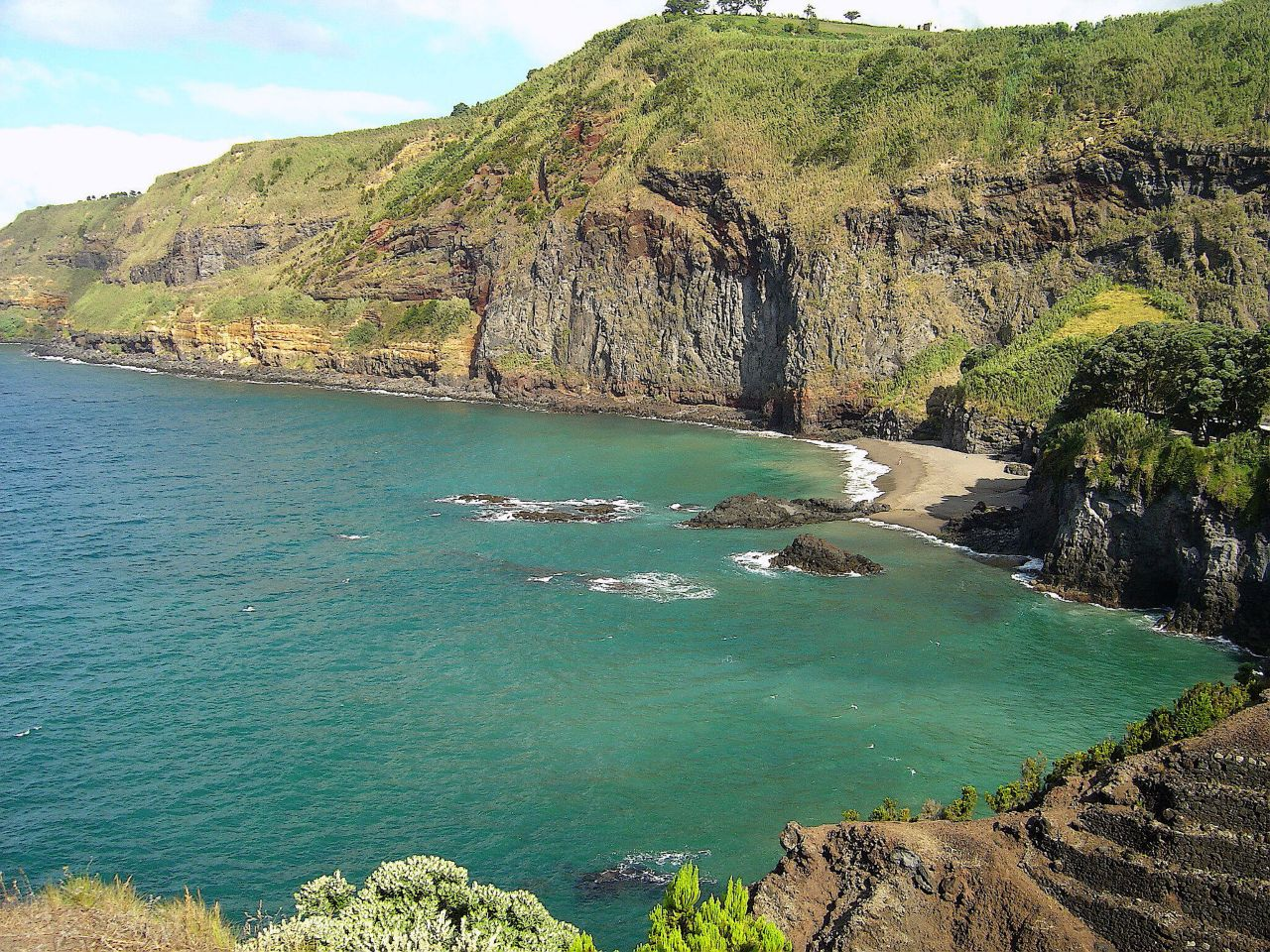
- A view of Baixo da Areia beach along the southern coastal area, separated from the village of Caloura

- The location of the civil parish of Água de Pau within the municipality of Lagoa
- Coordinates: 37°43′16″N 25°30′38″W
- Country: Portugal
- Auton. region: Azores
- Island: São Miguel
- Municipality: Lagoa
- Established: Settlement: c. 1414; Parish: 28 July 1500; Civil parish: c. 1515

Area
  - Total: 17.46 km^{2} (6.74 sq mi)
- Elevation: 103 m (338 ft)

Population (2011)
  - Total: 3,058
  - Density: 175.1/km^{2} (453.6/sq mi)
- Time zone: UTC−01:00 (AZOT)
  - Summer (DST): UTC+00:00 (AZOST)
- Postal code: 9560-217
- Area code: 292
- Patron: Nossa Senhora dos Anjos

Água de Pau is a civil parish in the municipality of Lagoa in the Portuguese archipelago of the Azores. The population in 2011 was 3,058, in an area of 17.46 km^{2}. It contains the localities Água de Pau, Caloura, Cerco, Cinzeiro, Galera and Jubileu.

== History ==
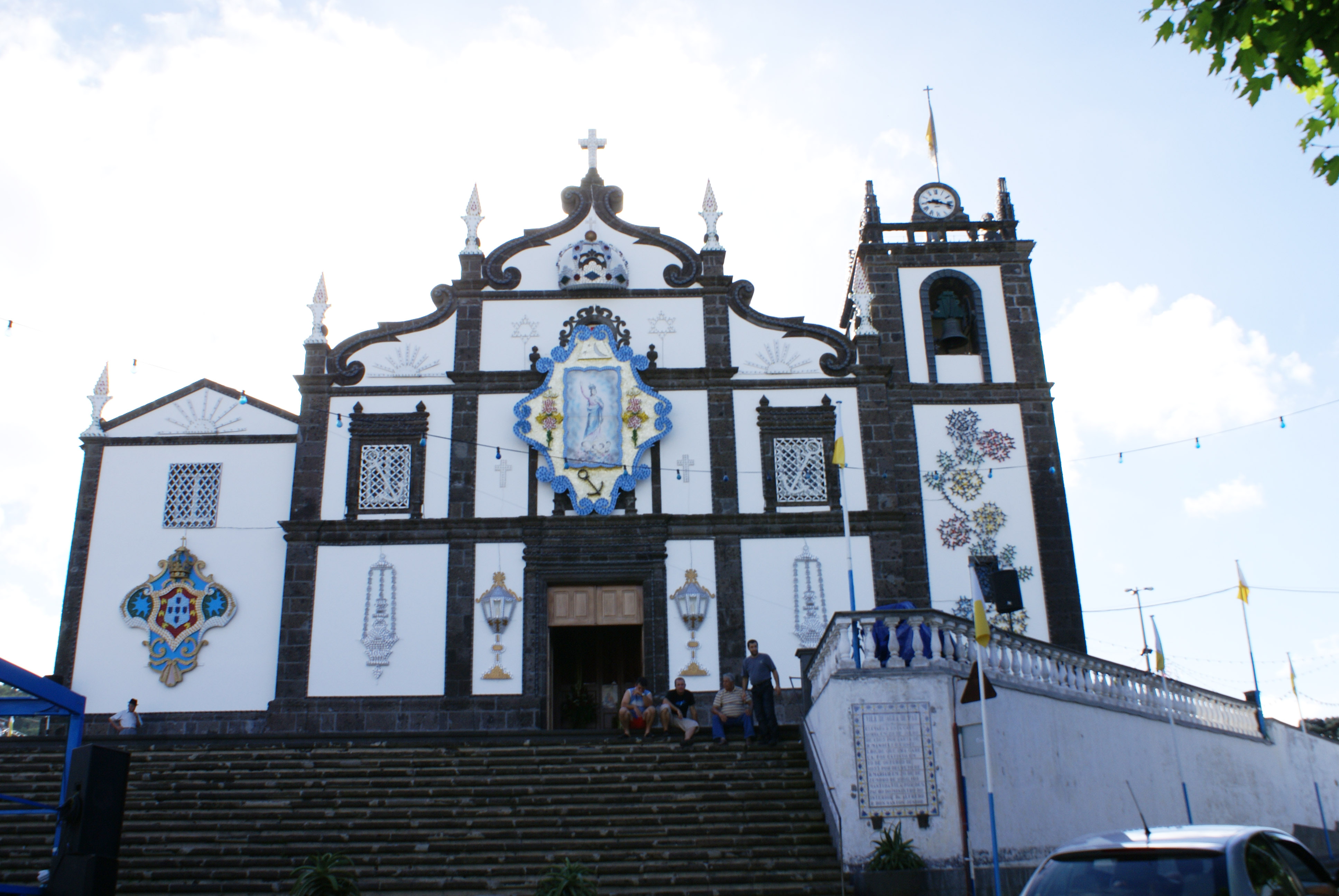
The front facade of Nossa Senhora dos Anjos, along the Regional Road in the center of Água de Pau, Lagoa

There are various theories as to the origin of the villa's name, Água de Pau, which literally means water of wood (which can be interpreted as waters where wood exist). The most recognized story pertains to early settlers whom, upon arriving in the vicinity of the coast, noticed a large ravine emptying into the ocean from a swamp. Another story defended locally is that the name derived from the corruption of the phrase "Água do Paul" (paul possibly being a term for swamp or bog), which itself referred to the "Ribeira do Paul", an old ravine that existed in the area behind the older parochial church of Nossa Senhora dos Anjos. The Paul has long since disappeared, and the area behind the church has been cultivated over the decades. Nossa Senhora dos Anjos dos Céus was founded, as was the custom, in the center of the faith community and it is likely that this area was an initial settlement for the community.

What is known, is that the settlement is concentrated around this church (dating back to about 1444) owing to the abundance of potable water and fertile lands. On 28 July 1515, the parish was incorporated, and the administration elevated, to the status of vila (town) by King D. Manuel I; this municipal seat, its territory comprising about a half a league of land, was de-annexed from the neighboring territory of Vila Franca do Campo.

Its urban nucleus, with its narrow streets, are typical of the colored houses, flowered avenues and traditional homes of the older buildings of Portugal, but following the 1522 Vila Franca earthquake many of these homes were destroyed: reconstruction was completed on 10 November 1525.

Its administrative role lasted for 330 years, until 24 June 1853, when the parish was incorporated into the municipality of Lagoa, while still retaining the honorific vila title (under Regional Legislative Decree 29/2003/A), to function as a civil parish.

== Geography ==
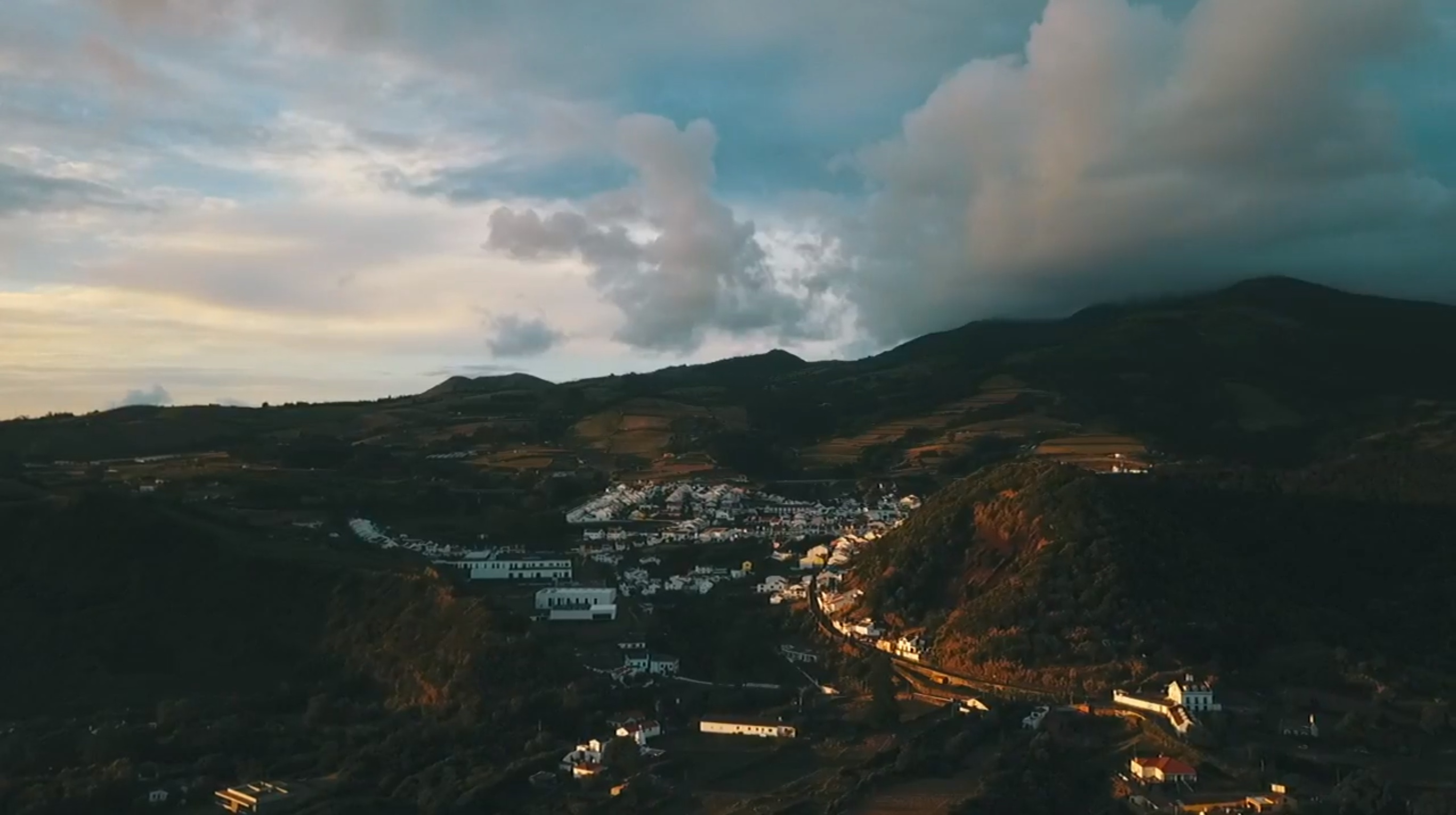
A view of the parish of Água de Pau, as seen from the coast, along the slopes of the Água de Pau massif

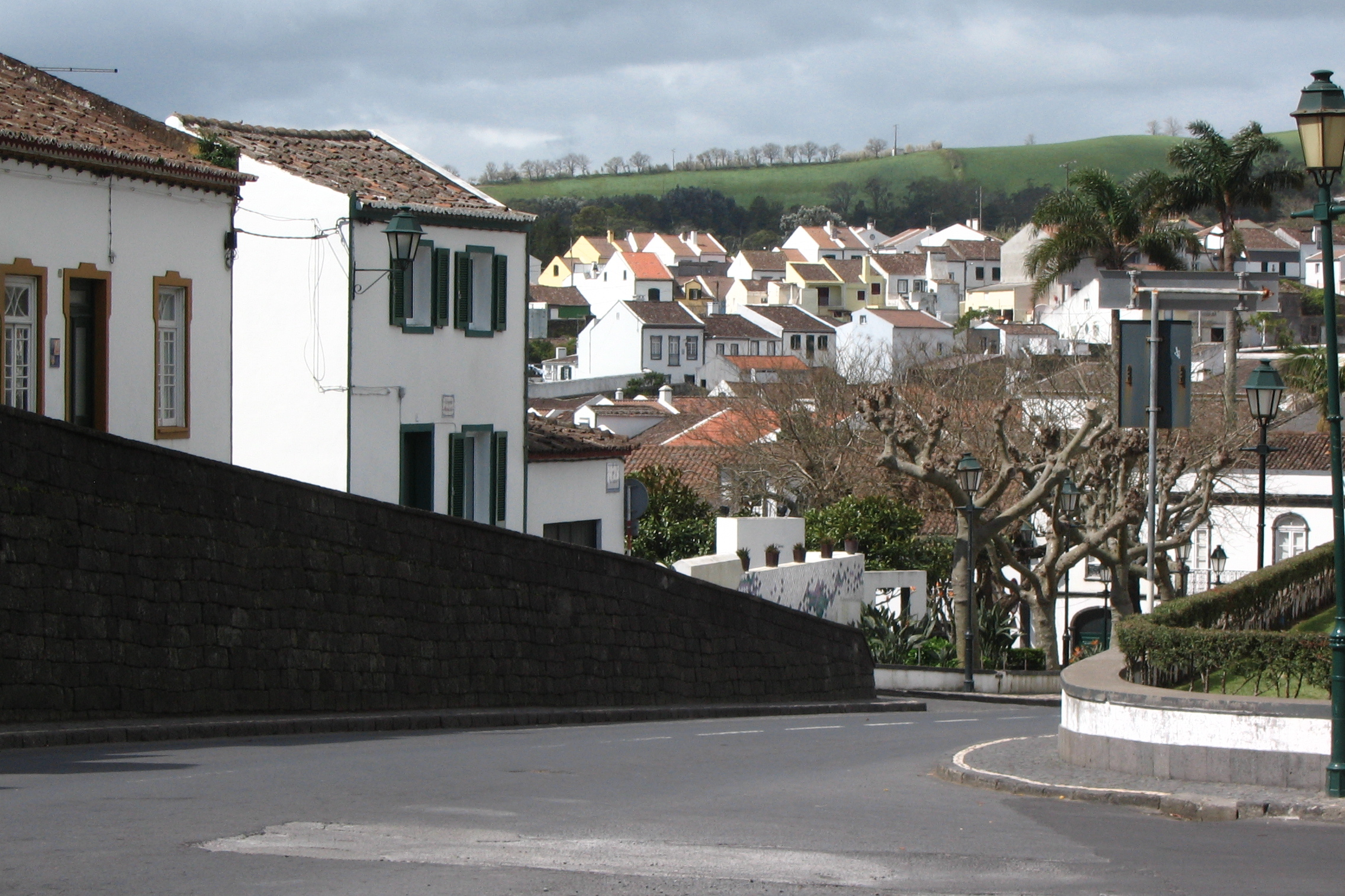
The compact streets that wind around the main center of Água de Pau

The town of Água de Pau is located along the southern coast of the island of São Miguel, approximately 7 kilometres (4.3 mi) from the municipal center of Lagoa. It is bordered on either frontier by the Lagoan parishes of Santa Cruz (to the west) and Ribeira Chã (to the east), and fronts the Atlantic Ocean to the south. The interior headlands form part of the Água de Pau Massif, the central volcanic complex that formed the municipality and central portion of the island. This area is a shared frontier with the parishes of Santa Bárbara and Ribeira Seca in the municipality of Ribeira Grande (to the north) and Água de Alto (to the east) in the municipality of Vila Franca do Campo.

The territory is bisected by the Via-Rapida that transits the territory from Ponta Delgada to Vila Franca do Campo, but also by an older municipal roadway that connects the villages of the municipality, while rural roads intersperse these areas.

== Architecture ==
The village has a rich architectural history, and can be seen in many of the civil and religious buildings erected over the centuries. The water fountains are particularly important vestiges of the historical community. To many of the local residents, these fountains were the sources of water, and centers of community meetings and fraternization. The main Chafariz de Água de Pau, located in the Largo de São Pedro, the fountain Praça da Republica and the water fountain of Nossa Senhora dos Anjos were important markers of community life within the villa.

=== Civic ===
- Civil Parish Offices (Portuguese: Junta de Freguesia de Água de Pau), the civil parish office building, constructed in the 18th century, by the father of the old Captain-major of the villa of Água de Pau. It is a rectangular building, with a front facade of basalt rock, a private park, and an older chapel, utilized as offices by the local mayor. This building is also referred to as the Casa da Estrela ("House of the Star") because its owner, Floriano Vítor Borges (who was responsible for many of the large public works on the island of São Miguel), placed a copper star on the main door (in the first half of the 20th century).
- Residence of the Captain-Major (Portuguese: Casa do Capitão-Mor), located along the Rua da Natividade, the house of the Captain-major was the residence of João Policarpo Botelho de Arruda and is an example of the 18th-19th-century nobleman's residence;

=== Religious ===
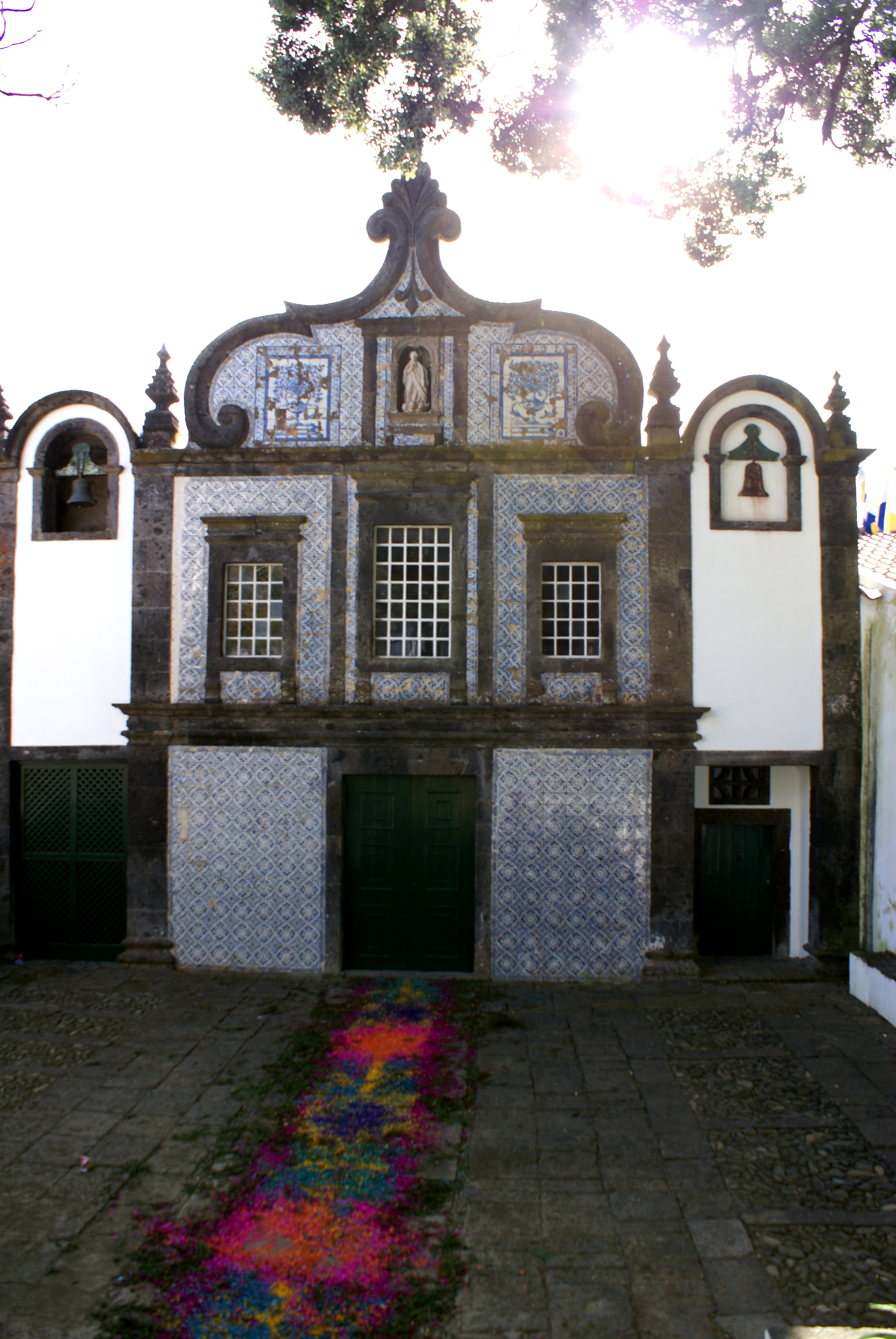
Front facade of the chapel annex of the Convent of Caloura, dedicated to Nossa Senhora das Dores, Caloura, Lagoa

- Chapel of São Pedro (Portuguese: Capela de São Pedro), dedicated in 1907 to the apostle Peter, this chapel is located in the cemetery and was extended in 2000 to include a small museum.
- Church of Nossa Senhora dos Anjos (Portuguese: Igreja Paroquial de Água de Pau/Igreja de Nossa Senhora dos Anjos), in the parochial church of the village of Água de Pau, it is located on a small hill along the main regional road. This church was "decorated" by King D. Manuel I, for the services of several local men, but the church was destroyed during the 1522 earthquake. The new temple was begun in 1525, and completed in the Baroque-style in 1744, expanding the interior to three naves (a royal coat-of-arms and rich panels of azulejos are part of the interior).
- Convent of Caloura (Portuguese: Convento da Caloura/Recolhimento da Caloura), the convent and annex chapel of Our Lady of Pain is located in the resort of the same name. The main nave of the church is covered in poly-chromatic azulejos, with the main altar covered in gold leaf, in addition to strange images of bearded angels. Until 1541, the convent was a residence for many nuns, and later replaced by monks owing to constant attacks by pirates in the area. An image of Senhor Santo Cristo dos Milagres, gifted by the Pope, resided with the nuns and traveled with them to the Convent da Esperança, in Ponta Delgada. The convent is currently private property.
- Hermitage of Nossa Senhora do Monte (Portuguese: Ermida de Nossa Senhora do Monte), located on a hill in Água de Pau, this chapel was created after a Marian apparition by a local child, Maria Joana Tavares do Canto and her friend (but later approximately 12,000 people witnessed the apparition of the Virgin Mary on July 5, 1918). The chapel was constructed by the parents of Maria Joana, in a hexagonal design with an image of Nossa Senhora do Monte alongside the altar. In 1998, with the authorization of the Bishop of the Azores, an illuminated-cross was constructed behind the chapel by the Associação Católica Cristo Jovem.
- Hermitage of São Tiago (Portuguese: Ermida de São Tiago), located in the Largo do Santiago in Água do Pau, it was constructed in 1700 and dedicated to the Apostle James; since 1986, it has been used as a mortuary chapel.

== Culture ==
=== Festivities ===
Água de Pau's principal festival occurs on the assumption day of Nossa Senhora dos Anjos aos Céus, on August 15: the second oldest religious festival on the island of São Miguel. Locals and tourists participate in the event, that includes promessas, petitions to the Virgin Mary and prayers of thanksgiving. A traditional procession runs through the streets of the villa, showing the devotion and faith of the local community. In the following weekend, the traditional Festa do Pescador (Fisherman's Festival) in the seaside resort of Caloura is celebrated. In addition to music and traditional choruses, the popular local cuisine is celebrated with fried Largehead hairtail and mackerel, washed-down with local red wine and accompanied with corn bread. The feast day of Nossa Senhora das Dores is also widely celebrated, on the second or third Sunday in September.

The town also participates in the annual Festivals of the Divine Holy Spirit, celebrated in its six principal impérios or religious niche/chapels: the Império da Festa, the Império da Trindade, the Império de São João, the Império do Coração de Jesus, the Império de São Pedro and the Império de São Tiago.

Celebrations to honor the elevation of Água de Pau to the status of villa, on July 28, are also popular in the community and celebrated in the Largo de São Tiago and Casa da Junta (the parish house).
