= Recreational Forest Reserve of Valverde =

Recreational forest

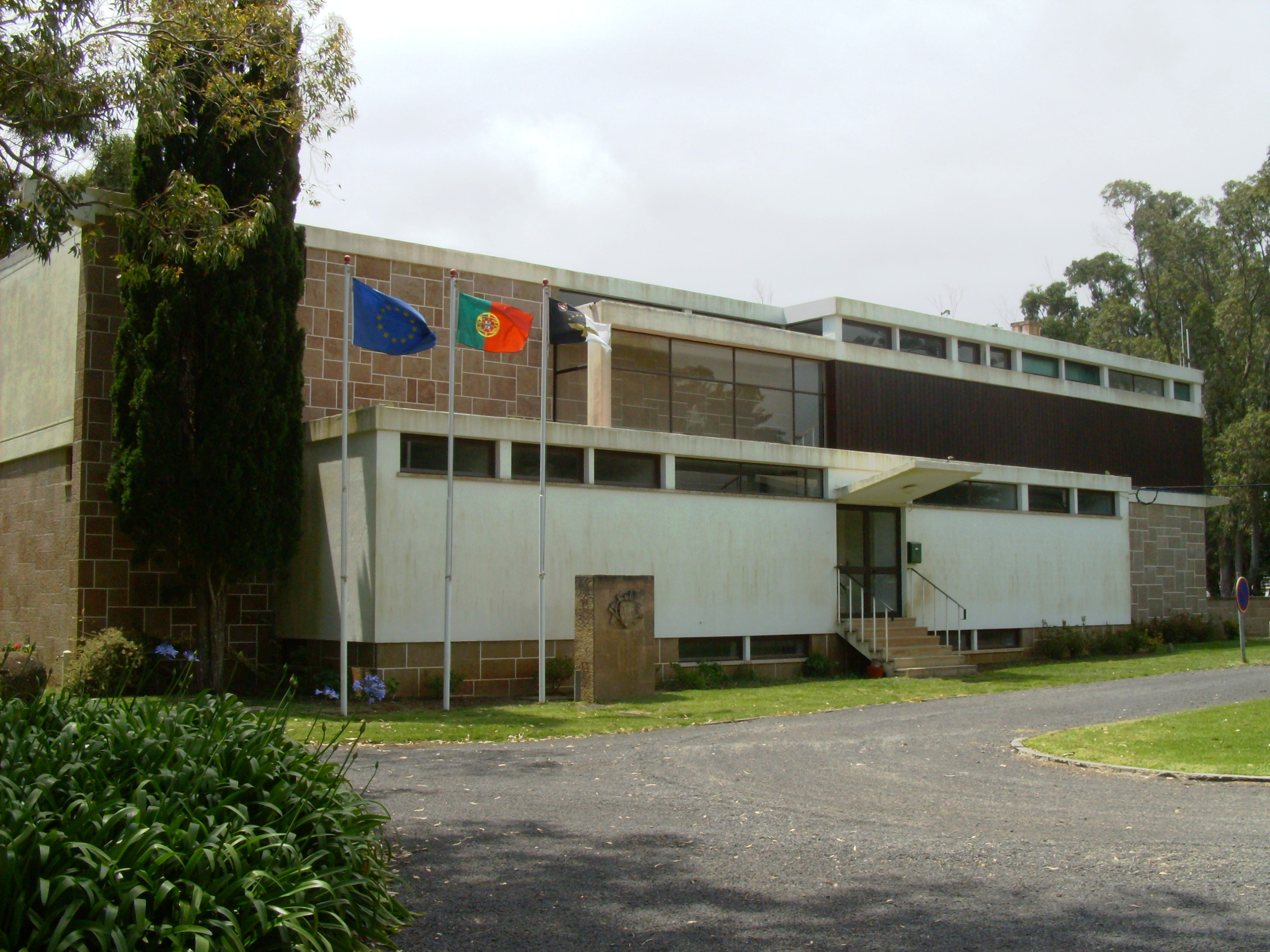
- Inaugurated in 1963, the administrative building of the Direcção dos Recursos Florestais for Santa Maria

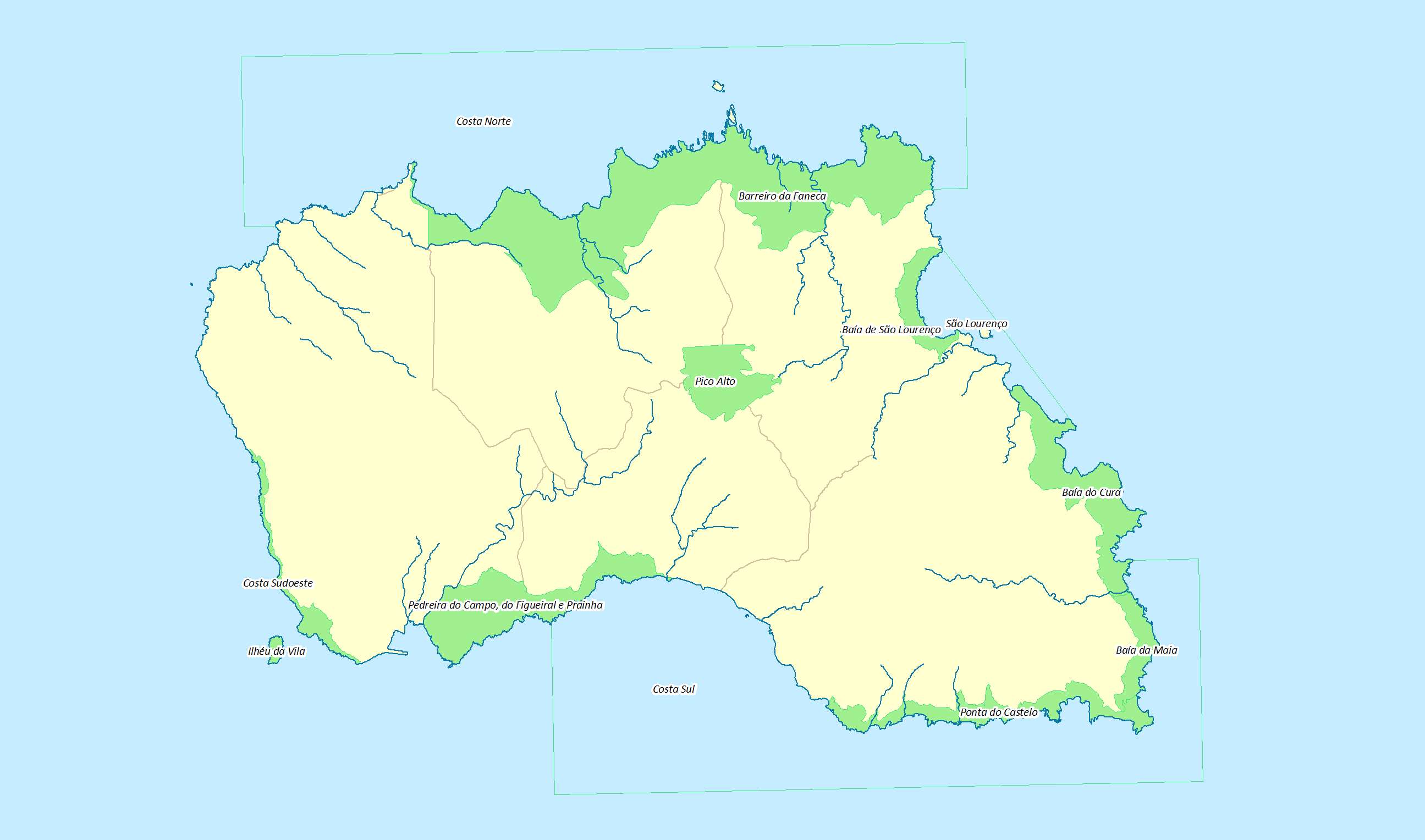
- Location within Nature Park of Santa Maria
- Location: Vila do Porto, Santa Maria, Eastern, Azores, Portugal
- Coordinates: 36°57′31.27″N 25°8′6.63″W
- Elevation: 135 m (443 ft)
- Established: Decreto Legislativo Regional 16/1989/A
- Named for: Valverde
- Visitors: Closed (in Sundays)
- Operator: Secretário Regional do Ambiente e do Mar
- Geographic detail from CAOP (2010) produced by Instituto Geográfico Português (IGP)

The Recreational Forest Reserve of Valverde (Portuguese: Reserva Florestal de Recreio do Valverde) is a recreational forest located centrally on the island of Santa Maria, in the civil parish of Vila do Porto, municipality of Vila do Porto in the Portuguese archipelago of the Azores.

== History ==
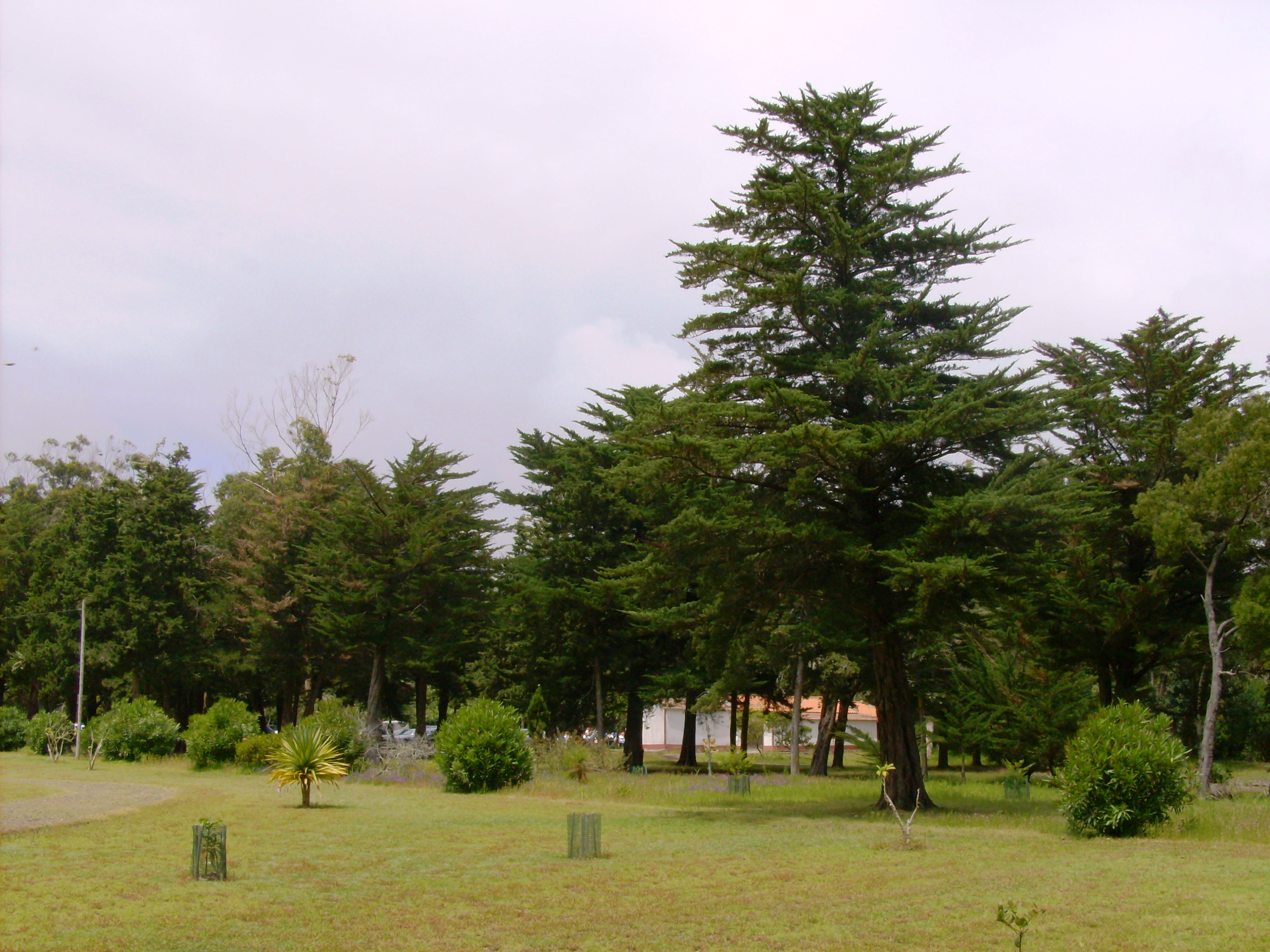
The open spaces near the deer and animal pens, looking towards the children's park and washrooms

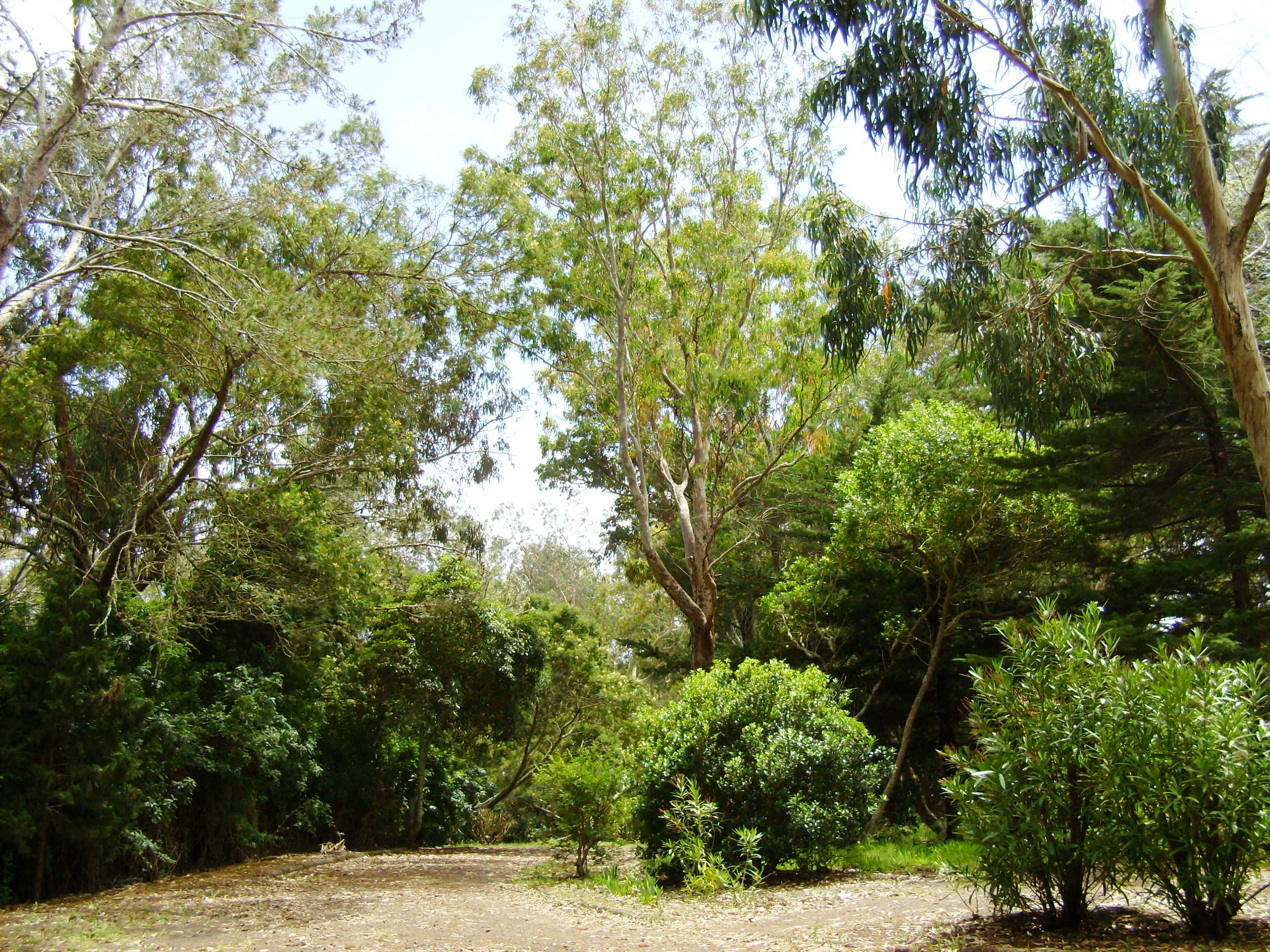
Pedestrian trail within the Nature Reserve

The Reserva Florestal de Recreio de Valverde was created by decree on August 30, 1989 (16/89/A) by the legislature of the Regional Government of the Azores, but dates back to the creation of the Forest Services in 1949.

It is administered by the Secretaria Regional de Agricultura e Pescas (Regional Secretariat for Agriculture and Fishing), and run day-to-day by the Direcção Regional de Recursos Florestais (Regional Directorate of Forest Resources), as the seat of the Forest Services on the island of Santa Maria.

== Geography ==
Located in Salvaterra, in the parish of Vila do Porto, the park's 4 hectares are situated at approximately 130 metres (430 ft) above sea level. The park is composed of picnic and play areas with picturesque views, where animals are also exhibited. The nature reserve is a multi-use unit in the Azores archipelago combining several activities; it is oriented towards human-nature interactivity, providing spaces for human leisure (picnicking, barbecues, minor recreational activities, sightseeing, pedestrian trails) with aspects of nature (public education and proximity to flora and fauna associated with the area).

There are short pedestrian trails, with access to various infrastructures; in the past there have been public tours/walks and activities associated with identifying native species of flora and educating residents on conservation.

The highlight of the park is the headquarters building, inaugurated in 1962, based on a pilot project, of French origin.

The Valverde Reserve is an area with many Eucalyptus and Cypress trees, as well as endemic plants such as Picconia azorica and the local AzoreanHeather.
