= Vila do Porto (parish) =

- Civil parish
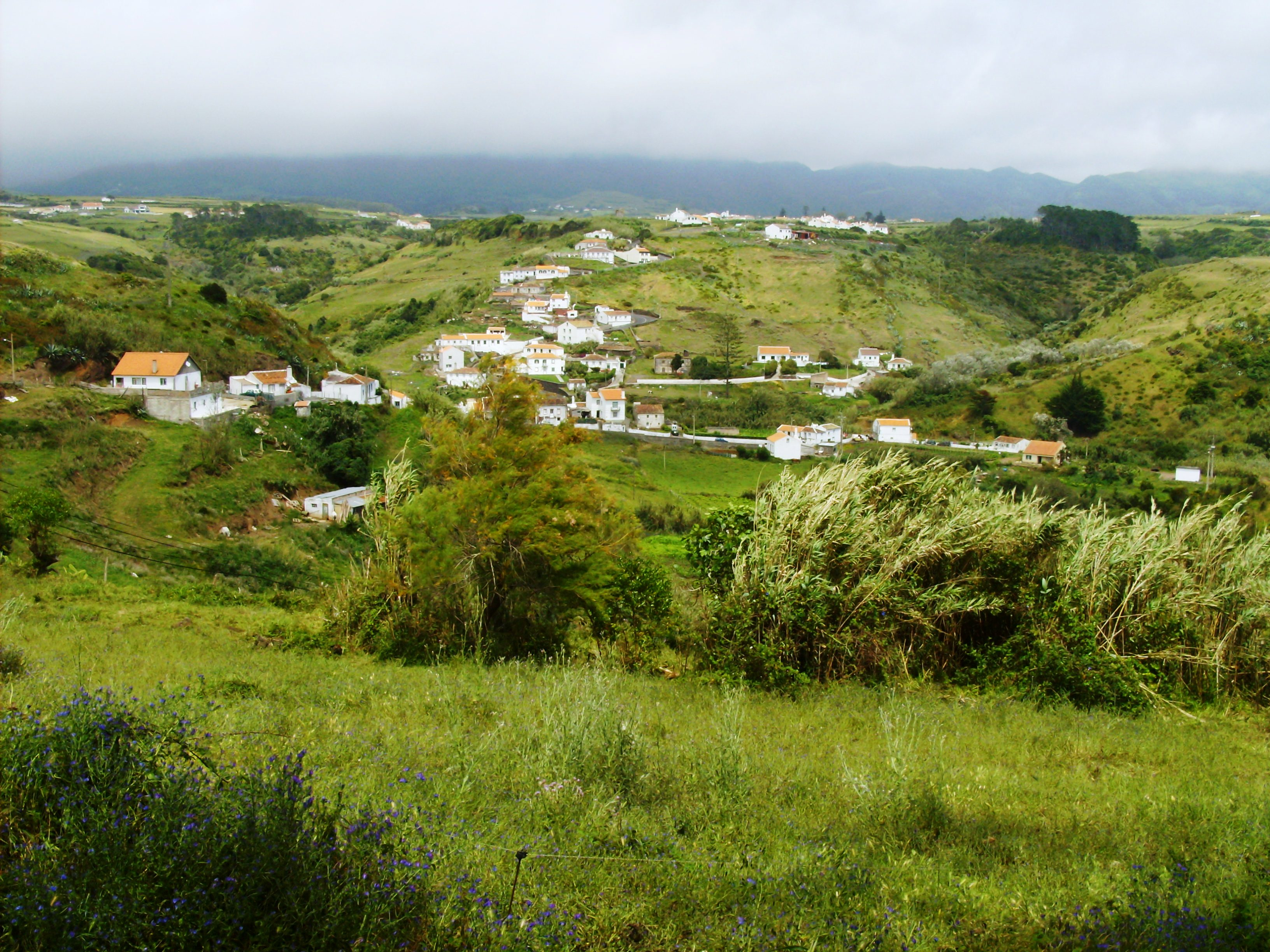
- The secluded village of Valverde, literally green-valley, near the eastern border of the parish of Vila do Porto

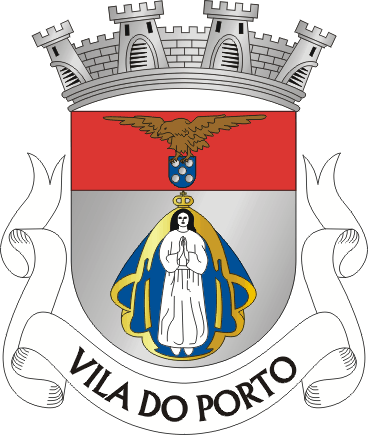
- Coat of arms

- Location of the civil parish of Vila do Porto, within the municipality of the same name
- Coordinates: 36°58′23″N 25°9′38″W
- Country: Portugal
- Auton. region: Azores
- Island: Santa Maria
- Municipality: Vila do Porto

Area
  - Total: 25.55 km^{2} (9.86 sq mi)
- Elevation: 107 m (351 ft)

Population (2011)
  - Total: 3,119
  - Density: 122.1/km^{2} (316.2/sq mi)
- Time zone: UTC−01:00 (AZOT)
  - Summer (DST): UTC+00:00 (AZOST)
- Postal code: 9580-525
- Area code: 292
- Patron: Nossa Senhora da Assunção

Vila do Porto (Portuguese pronunciation: [ˈvilɐ ðu ˈpoɾtu]) is a civil parish in the municipality of Vila do Porto, located on the island of Santa Maria, in the Portuguese autonomous region of Azores. The population in 2011 was 3,119, in an area of 25.55 km².

== History ==
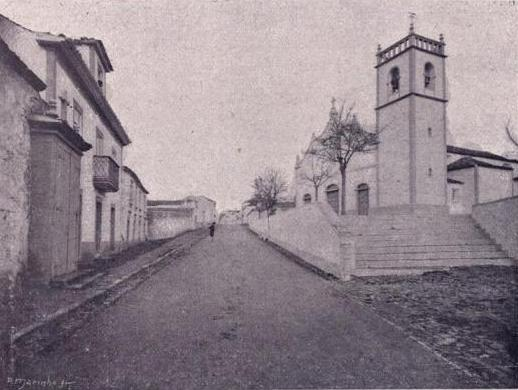
The Church of Nossa Senhora da Assunção, as seen in 1902

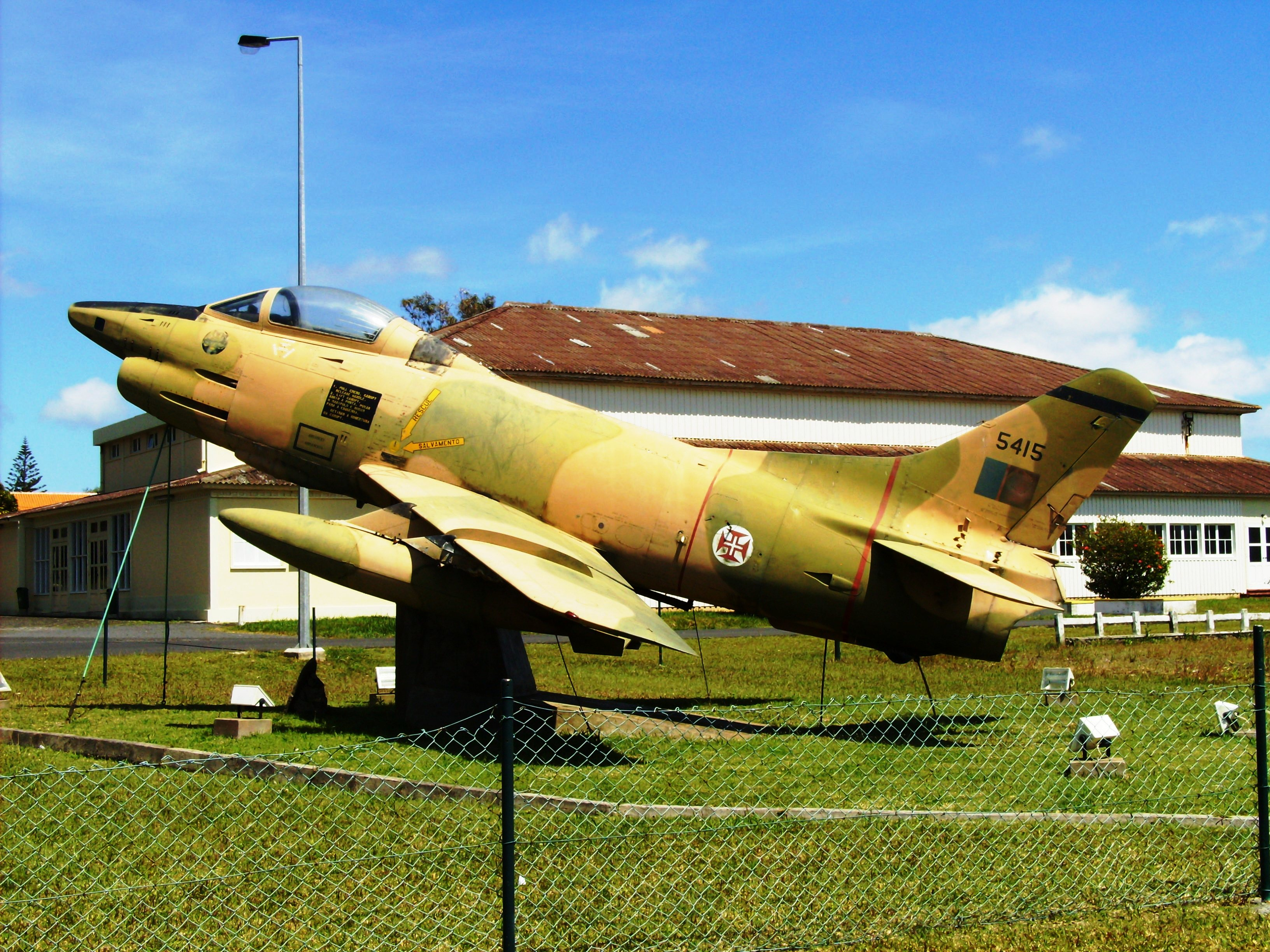
A Fiat G.91 from the Força Aérea Portuguesa in the region of Aeroporto, former military airbase

Following its discovery by Diogo Silves, Friar Gonçalo Velho Cabral noble in the House of Henry the Navigator, commander in the Order of Christ, arrived at Santa Maria in 1432, then referred to as the Ilha dos Lobos (island of wolves), referring to the wolf seals found in the region at the time. It was the seat of the first captaincy of the islands of the Azores (that included Santa Maria and São Miguel. Its settlement began in 1439, after the original beachhead in Praia dos Lobos (in the north of the island). A regal charter from Infante Peter (regent of King Afonso V), dated 2 July 1439, indicated that Henry had ordered that sheep should be deposited on the seven islands of the Azores. São Miguel and Santa Maria were the first islands to be settled by families from Estremadura, Alto Alentejo and Algarve, through the initiative of Gonçalo Velho, then the designated first Captain-donatário of the Azores.

The settlement of the southerly villa of Porto occurred in 1450, by Fernão de Quental, on a hilltop overlooking the southern coast over a wide cove. The parish was founded with a foral (charter) issued in 1470.

Life in this community was isolated, inaccessible and poorly defensible. Many of the early documents associated with its founding were lost in a pirate attack occurring in 1616. Consequently, at the beginning of the 17th century, the Fort of São Brás, on the site of Cimo da Rocha was likely constructed, alongside the hermitage dedicated to Nossa Senhora da Conceição.

Referring to the population, Gaspar Frutuoso (the humanist and chronicler) indicated:

"This town is populated and the whole island, of honorable people, and many of their progeny have been knighted, and others through wedding alliances with the Captains and their sons, who were born noble. All the honorable men, natives of this land, are generally high in stature, well disposed and proportioned, of good and serious faces and happy faces, presumptuosos [sic] and honorable friends, as is expected of honorable men."

In the 20th century (1901), Vila do Porto received a regal visit from King Carlos I and Queen Amélia. In 1908, still during the monarchy, the Republican Party elected their first member to the municipal council.

Following the construction of the international airport in 1944, primarily to serve as an emergency US airbase, in 1946 civil air traffic was inaugurated resulting in the development of a dynamic urban, economic and social culture in the archipelago. The institutionalization of air service resulted in the Portuguese establishment of a permanent presence, with the construction of the barrio of Aeroporto by architect Keil do Amaral becoming a result of this activity.

On 21 October 1992, the urbanized area of Vila do Porto, that included the historic town, was classified under Regional Legislative Decree 22/92/A, as an area of public interest. This was supported by a similar decree on 24 August 2004 (29/2004/2), to establish a jurisdictional regime to protect and recover some of the cultural patrimony (under article 58, line 3) that included the historic town.

== Geography ==
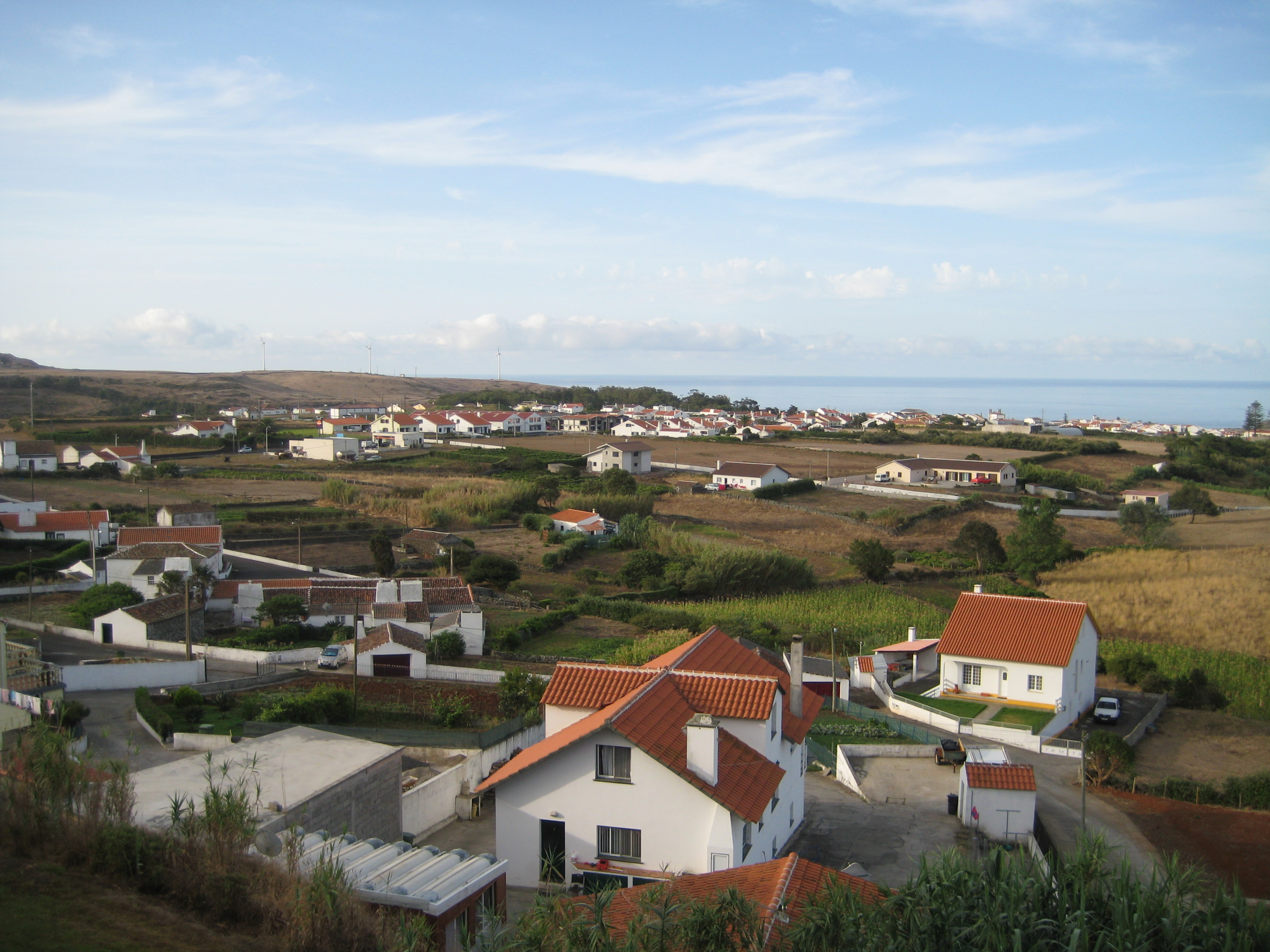
The view of the parish, as seen from the Hotel Colombo

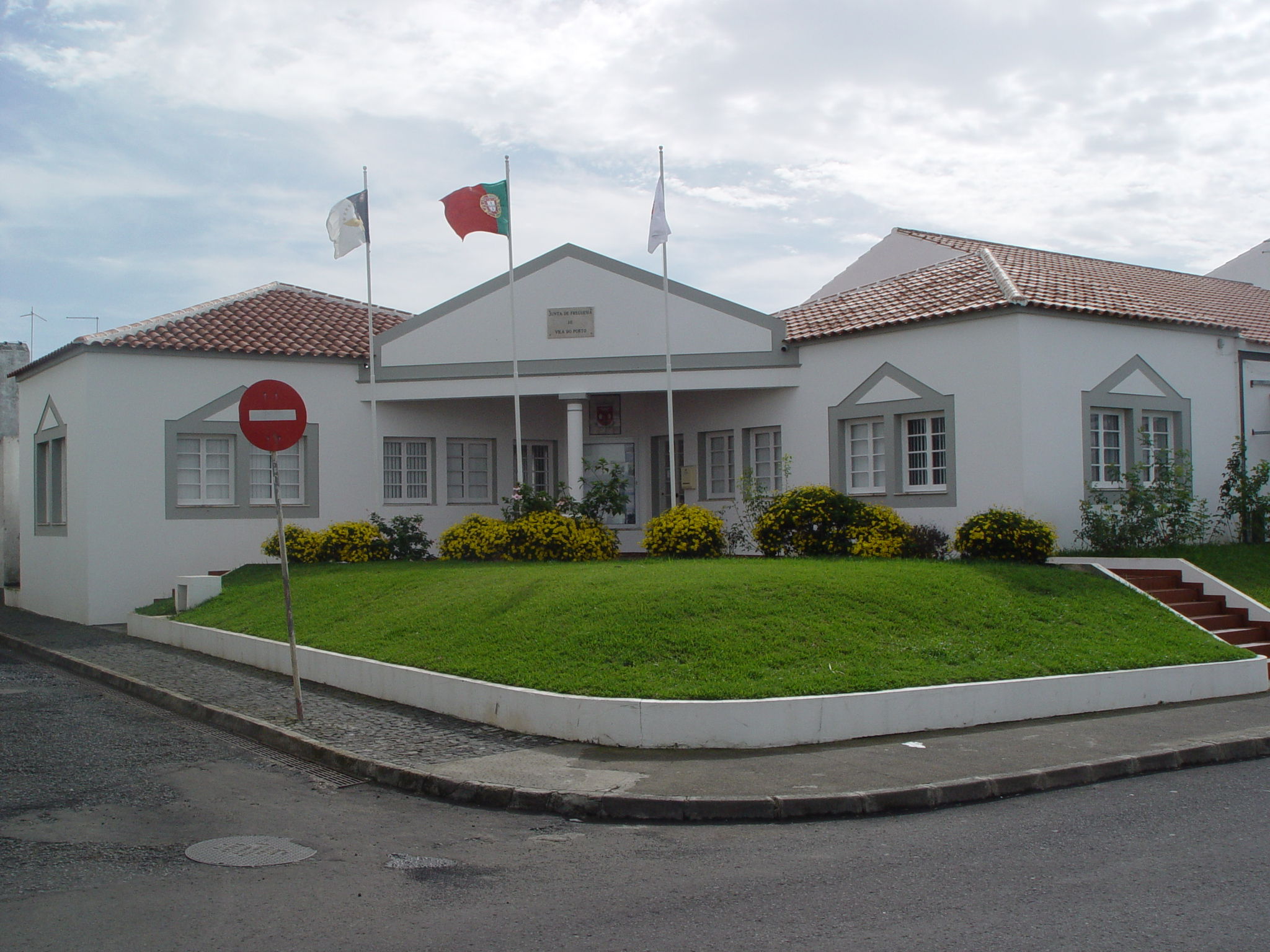
The seat of the parish of Vila do Porto, the Junta Freguesia

It is located along the western coast of the island, limited by the Atlantic Ocean to the north, west and south and the parishes of Almagreira and São Pedro in the east.

Not to be confused with the municipality of Vila do Porto, the oldest settlement in the Azores, is a semi-urban parish that includes two principal areas: a zone south of the parochial Church, that conforms to the medieval roads and village, and a modern area developed along new roadways to the north and eastern plain (that incorporates the barrio of Aeroporto and Vila) divided by two river-valleys (the São Francisco and Sancho). In addition there are various localities in the region, including Salvaterra, Valverde, Pedras de São Pedro, Flor da Rosa, Santana, and Anjos.

== Economy ==
While the parish's past was marked by agriculture, its modern economy concentrated on the secondary and tertiary markets, resulting from its importance as a hub of trans-Atlantic air traffic and commerce.

== Architecture ==
=== Civic ===
- Airport Barrio (Portuguese: Aeroporto de Santa Maria)
- Ceramic Factory of Santa Maria (Portuguese: Fábrica de Cerâmica de Santa Maria)
- Formigas Lighthouse (Portuguese: Farol das Formigas)
- Monument to Christopher Columbus (Portuguese: Monumento a Cristóvão Colombo)
- Primary School and Cantina of Vila do Porto (Portuguese: Escolas Primárias e Cantina de Vila do Porto)
- Residence of Father Manuel (Portuguese: Casa de Pe. Manuel)
- Residence of the 3rd Captain-Donatário (Portuguese: Casa do 3º Donatário da Ilha de Santa Maria)
- Residence Rua Teófilo Braga, 124 (Portuguese: Prédio na Rua Teófilo Braga, nº 124)
- Section Barracks and Fiscal Guard Post (Portuguese: Quartel da Secção e Posto da Guarda Fiscal de Vila do Porto)
- Shingle Kiln in Santo Antão (Portuguese: Forno de Telha de Santo Antão)
- Social Security Building (Portuguese: Edifício da Segurança Social)

=== Military ===
- Fort of São Brás (Portuguese: Forte de São Brás), situated at the southern edge of the town, the fort was part of a defensive line that dates back to the 15th century;

=== Religious ===
- Church of Nossa Senhora da Assunção (Portuguese: Igreja Matriz de Vila do Porto/Igreja de Nossa Senhora da Assunção)
- Church of Santo Antão (Portuguese: Igreja de Santo Antão)
- Church of the Misericórdia (Portuguese: Igreja da Misericórdia de Vila do Porto/Igreja do Senhor dos Passos)
- Convent of São Francisco (Portuguese: Convento de São Francisco/Igreja de Nossa Senhora da Vitória)
- Hermitage of Nossa Senhora dos Anjos (Portuguese: Capela de Nossa Senhora dos Anjos/Ermida dos Anjos e Treatro)
- Hermitage of Nossa Senhora da Boa Viagem (Portuguese: Ermida de Nossa Senhora da Boa Viagem)
- Hermitage of Nossa Senhora da Conceição da Rocha (Portuguese: Ermida de Nossa Senhora da Conceição/Nossa Senhora da Conceição da Rocha)
- Hermitage of São Pedro Gonçalves Telmo (Portuguese: Ermida do Corpo Santo/Ermida de São Pedro Gonçalves Telmo)
