= Convent of São Francisco (Vila do Porto) =

- Convento de São Francisco
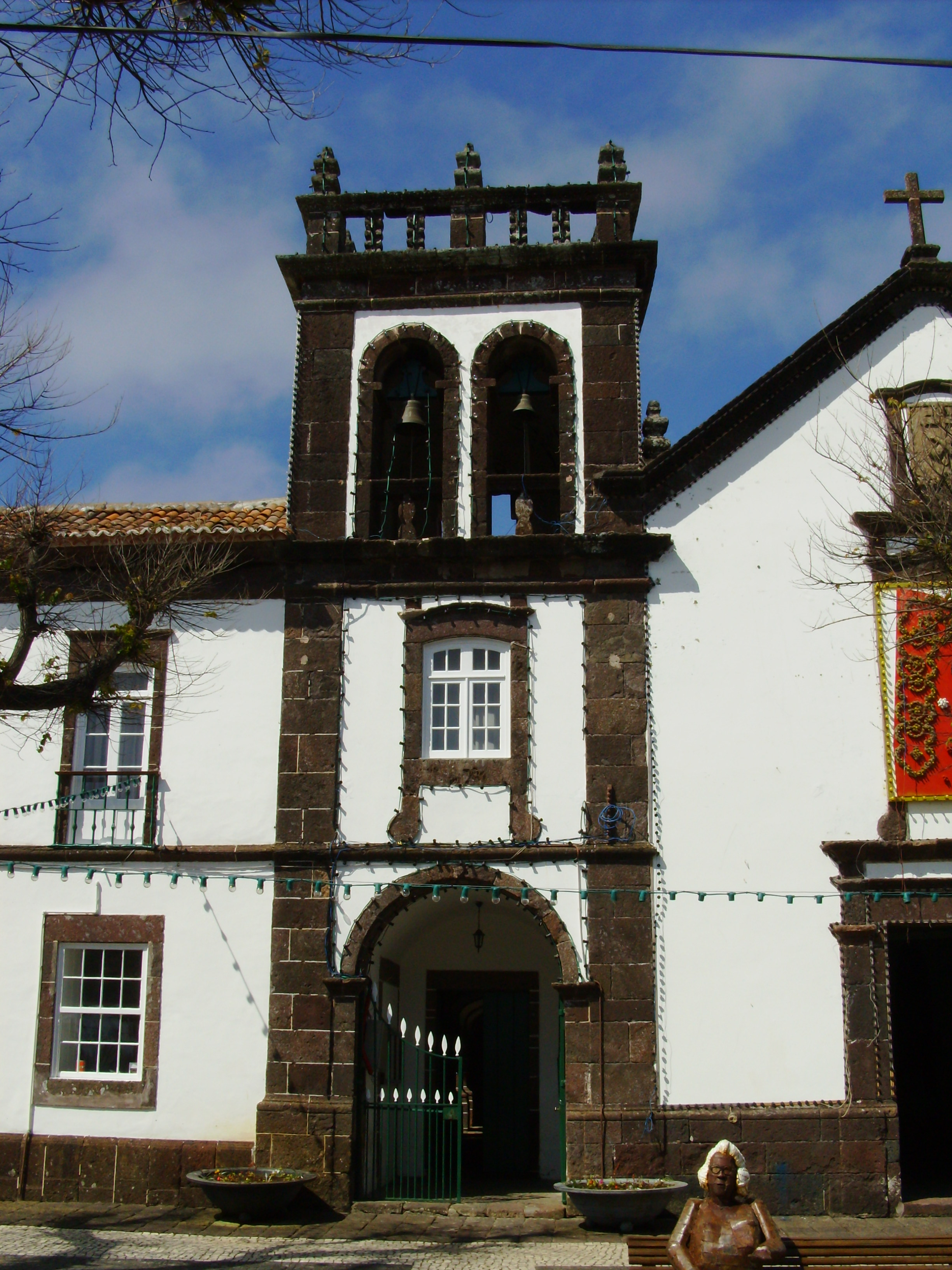
- The bell-tower and entrance to the Convent, and municipal chamber

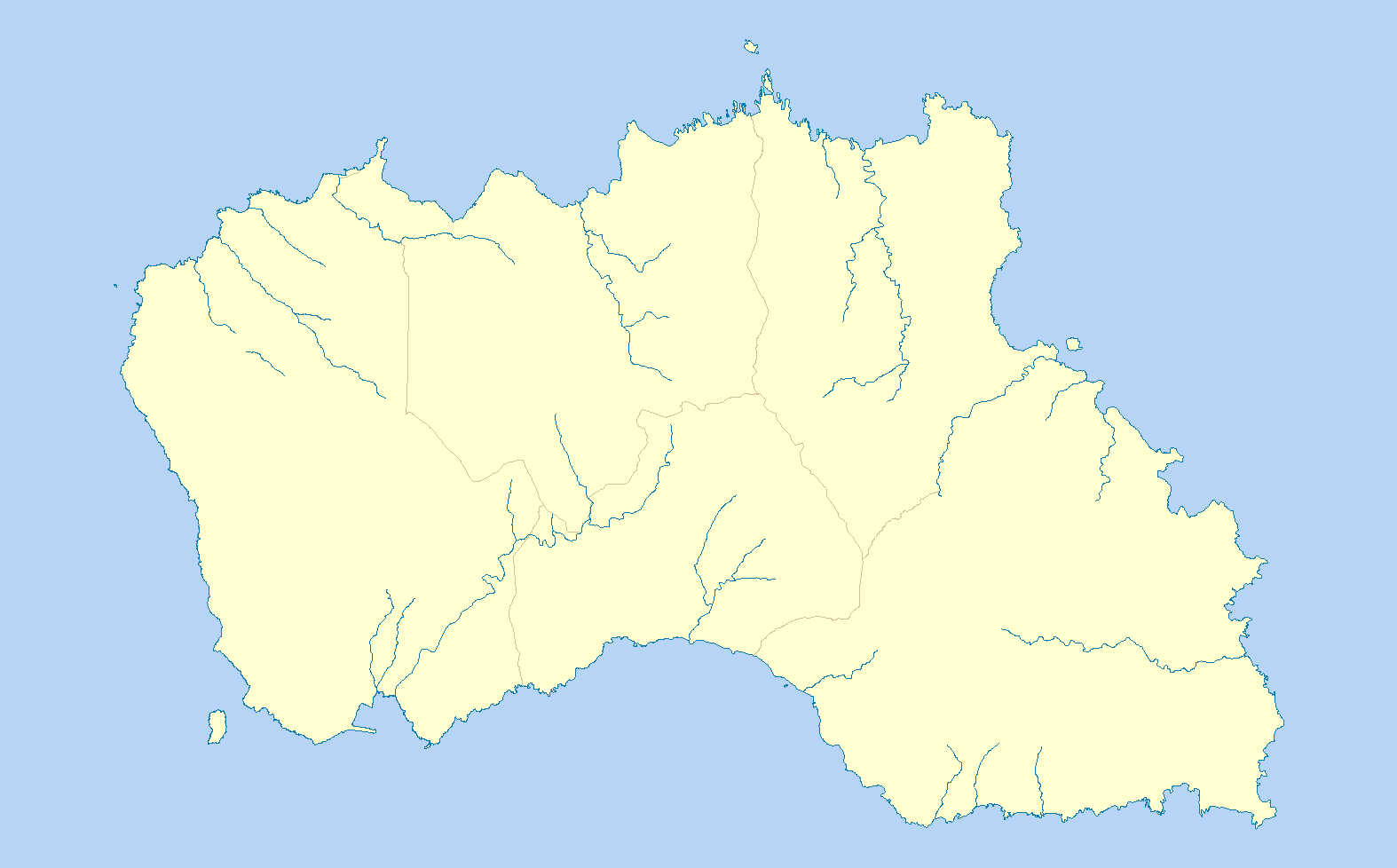
- Location of the convent on the island of Santa Maria

General information
- Type: Convent
- Architectural style: Medieval
- Location: Vila do Porto, Vila do Porto, Portugal
- Coordinates: 36°57′11.22″N 25°8′36.00″W
- Opened: c. 1607
- Owner: Câmara Municipal de Vila do Porto

Technical details
- Material: Basalt

The Convent of São Francisco, originally designated the Convent of Nossa Senhora da Vitória (which pertained to the Order of Saint Francis), located in the Largo of Nossa Senhora da Conceição, in the civil parish of Vila do Porto, municipality of the same name on the island of Santa Maria, in the Portuguese in the Azores.

== History ==
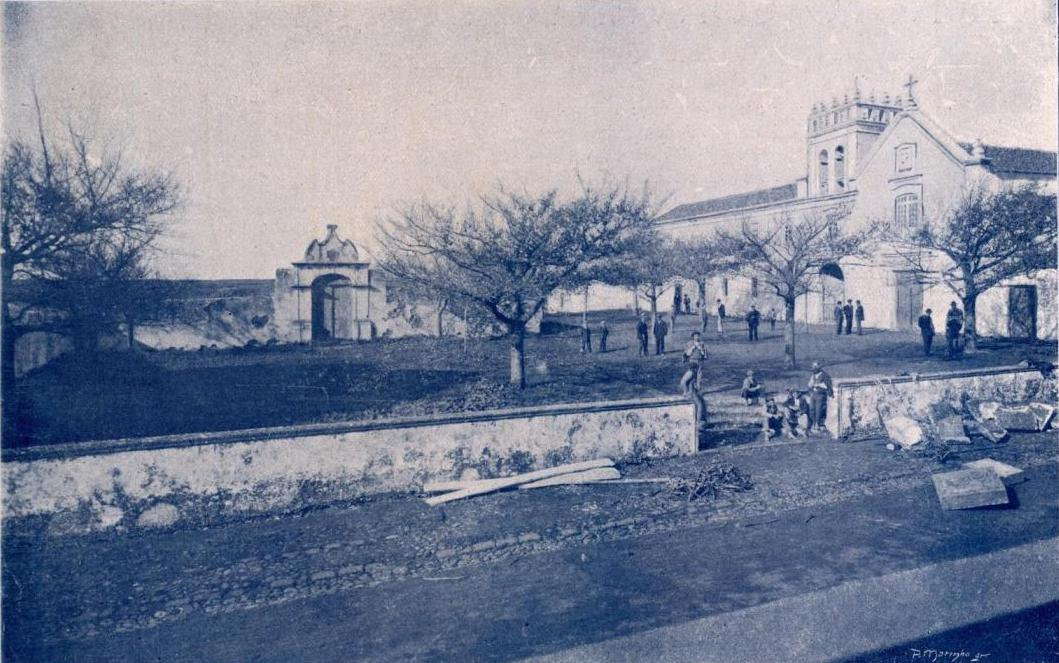
A 1903 view of the church and convent with open square

In friar Agostinho de Monte Alverne's Crónicas da Província de São João Evangelista, the clergyman suggested that Father Manuel da Esperança had indicated that there were three explanations leading to the establishment of the first convent on the island of Santa Maria. In the only one identified, he recounted how Esperança had recounted that immediately after its discovery, clergy were sent to populate the island. These first clergy were joined by others, forming a prelate community. But since they did not have "religious leave" to practice the faith by the Holy See, they approached Pope Nicholas V, who issued a papal writ on 28 April 1450. Yet, the community, being very small and the residents poor, they could not support a formal diocese and the congregation quickly evaporated.

The location of the convent was also identified by Gaspar Frutuoso, who believed that the first clergy on the island, remained along the northern coast, around Santa Ana, near Nossa Senhora dos Anjos (since the islets in the north were referred to as the ilhéus do Frade, or islets of the monk).

Monte Alverne determined that in the churchyard of the current convent, that an older hermitage dedicated to Nossa Senhora de Nazaré (Our Lady of Nazareth) was constructed of hay and used for religious celebrations, and that the convent was used to lodge the monks. As the population of the island grew, the more the small hermitage became too small to support the growing community. The founders of the Convent, friar Manuel do Corpo Santo and Father António da Piedade, arrived on the island on 17 September 1607.

Part of the land used to erect the primitive convent was donated at the end of the 16th century by nobleman António Coelho (a squire in the house of King Duarte), and his wife Catarina Vaz Velho, whom he married in Vila do Porto. The construction of the convent was approved in 1607, and building began on 27 October. As Monte Alverne noted:

"It is this convent, dedicated to the Holy Virgin of Victory, whose image came from our convent in the city of Ponta Delgada..."

The convent and church were sacked by Barbary coast pirates in 1616, and once again, in 1675. Reconstruction of the convent only occurred 1725, under the initiative of friar Agostinho de São Francisco, who was responsible for conserving the original azulejo tiles. Since 1689, the cloister and interior garden became the place where classes in rhetoric and Latin were held (these classes were famous in the archipelago for being open to all interested, regardless of their social condition). The curriculum included: a first and second class in Latin; rhetoric (then referred to as aula prima (first class); and moral theology. In 1791, Queen Maria I of Portugal, indicated her interest in establishing a chair in grammar at the convent, and on 23 March 1792, she established the appropriate stipend to support these classes. The 1799 execution of an organ, by Joaquim António Peres Fontanes, was undertaken, but it was eventually transferred to the Church of São José.

By the beginning of the 19th century (in 1808 and 1822) the convent was expanded and remodelled.

Following the expulsion of the religious orders, on 18 October 1833, the Fazenda Nacional took over the property. In 1842 and, again in 1979, restoration projects were completed in the convent.

By 31 July 1970 it had already been classified as a Property of Public Interest in decree 251/70 by the Direcção-Geral dos Edifícios e Monumentos Nacionais (DGEMN) (General-Directorate for Buildings and National Monuments). Since this time, the building has been used by the local municipal authority (Câmara Municipal de Vila do Porto), including the Tribunal da Comarca de Vila do Porto (municipal courts) and the Secção de Finanças e Tesouraria (finances and treasury).

== Architecture ==
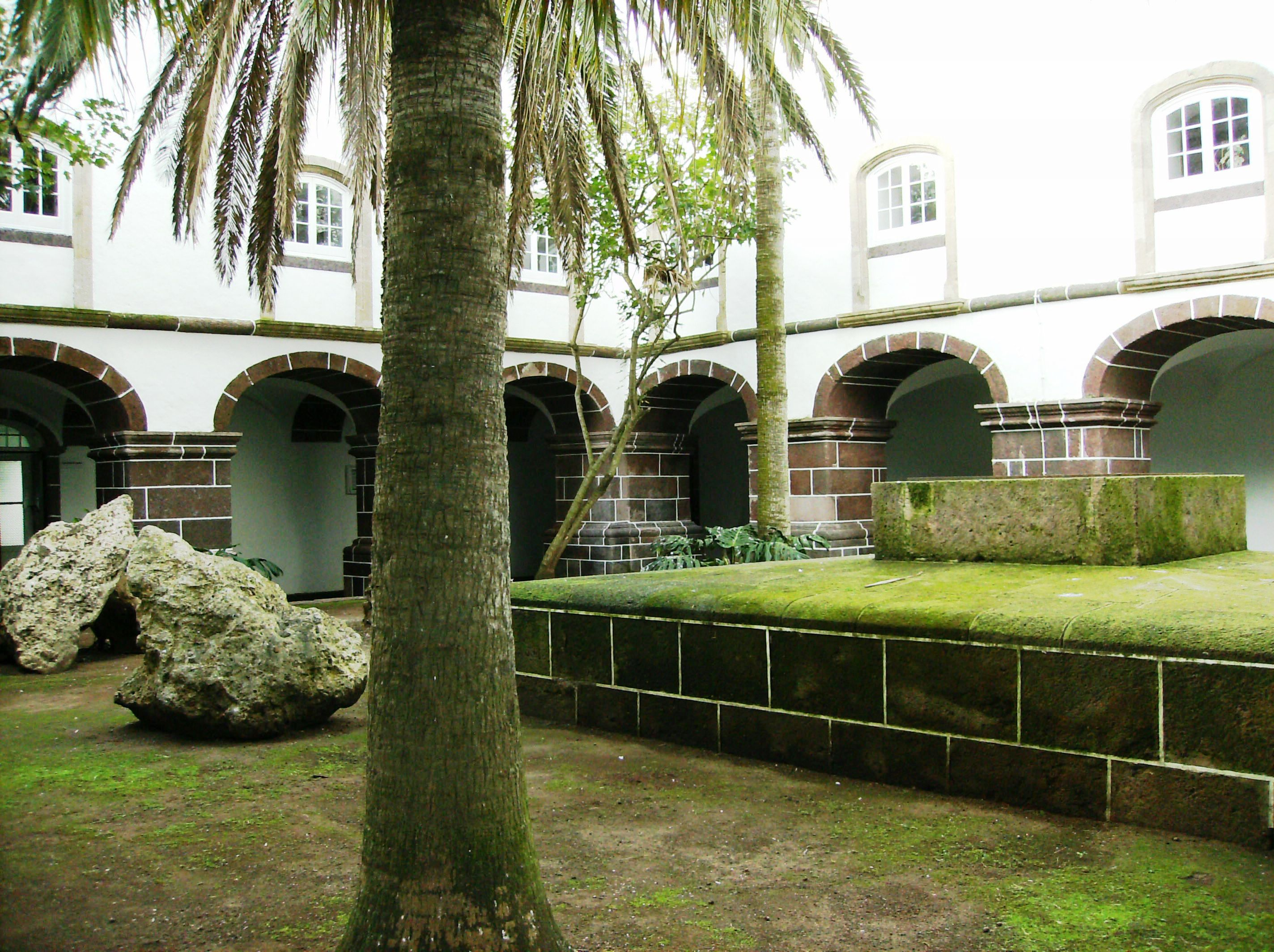
The cloister of the Convent of São Francisco, with internal cistern (right)

The group of buildings is actually oriented around the principal entranceway-tower, and includes a rectangular two-story building and courtyard (cloister) grafted to the portico/clock-tower of the Church of Nossa Senhora da Vitória and the Chapel of the Terceiros.

=== Church ===
The Church of Nossa Senhora da Vitória (Our Lady of Victory)is a long rectangular temple grafted along one wall of the cloister (to the right of the main entranceway) and is also three storeys tall. The main chapel, similarly rectangular, but much narrower, is covered in a vaulted ceiling with a niche located opposite the main entrance. On the nave wall on the side of the epistle, is the Chapel of Santo António, covered in 16th century azulejos (in blue, yellow and white) with two panels depicting the life of Saint Anthony.

The square-shaped bell-tower, which is the main entrance the municipal offices and cloister, extends to three-floors, and topped by a railing of balusters, with ornate cornices and parapet with pinnacles. Access to the building is made through a gated archway, while successive floors continue the Roman archway theme in windows and narrow, double bell-tower openings.

=== Cloister ===
The former residence of the clergy of the convent occupies the largest portion of the building (to the left of the entranceway), constructed of basalt and masonry stone. The simple two-storey building, whose façades are interspersed with double-pane guillotine-style windows (on the first floor) and narrow two-door window-doors (on the second floor), is covered with interlocking bricks. Within the interior structure, the first floor rooms are open to a vaulted gallery that itself is open to the courtyard, supported by short, wide pillars, while the interior walls are laced with chest-high windows. The second-floor plan extends from outside façade and over the open vaulted gallery, and includes several arched windows that overlook the cloister. The courtyard is dominated by a large, square cistern made of volcanic blocks, dating to 1680, as stated on the inscription on one of its sides

Besides the century plants there are three elegant palm trees (Archantophoenix elegans); originally four, the area in the southwest corner was replaced by a species of Livistona chinensa to maintain the symmetry.
