= Hermitage of Nossa Senhora dos Anjos (Vila do Porto) =

- Ermida de Nossa Senhora dos Anjos
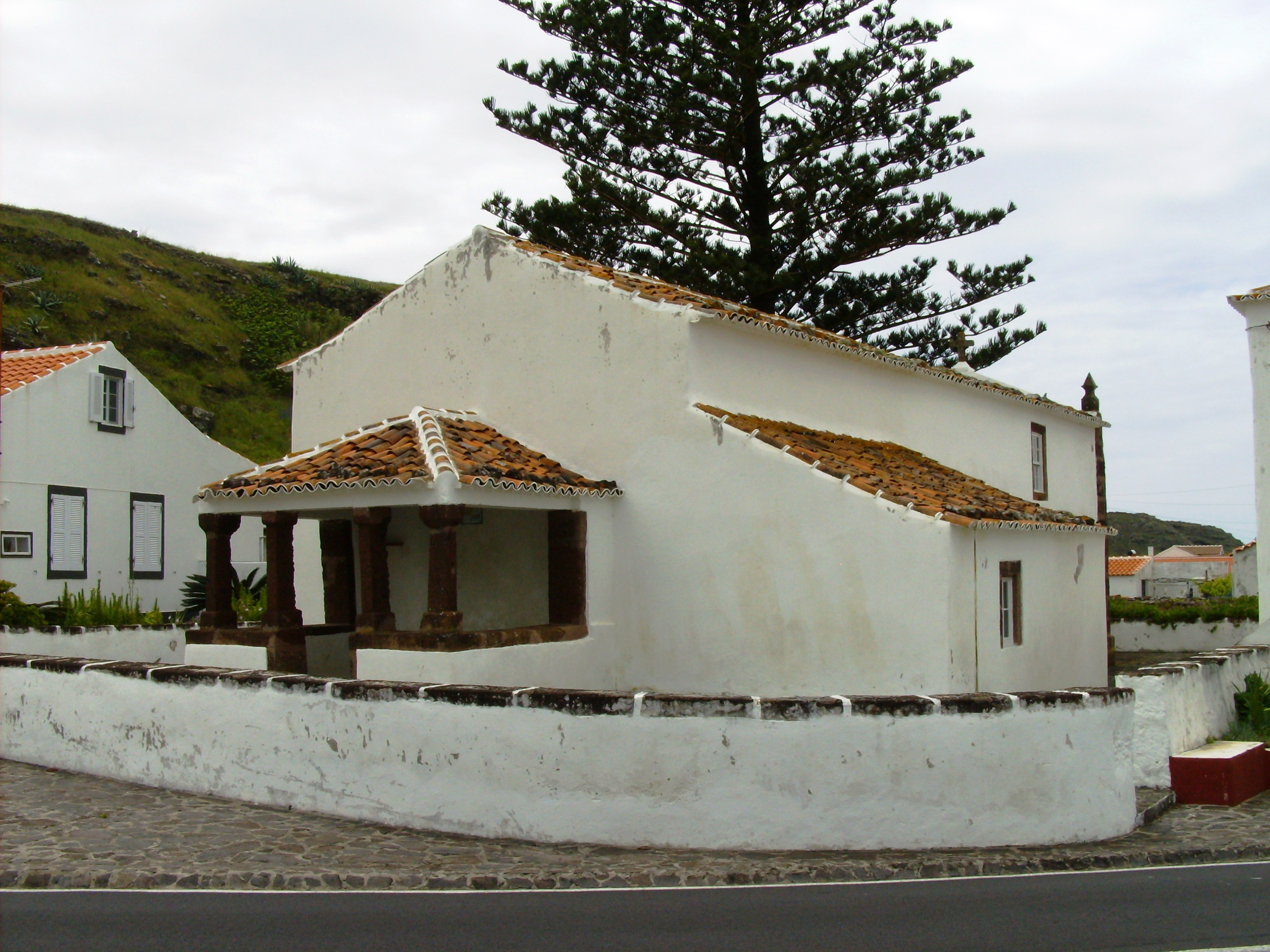
- The hermitage of Nossa Senhora, located on the main roadway into the village of Anjos, as seen from across the Regional E.R.1-1ª

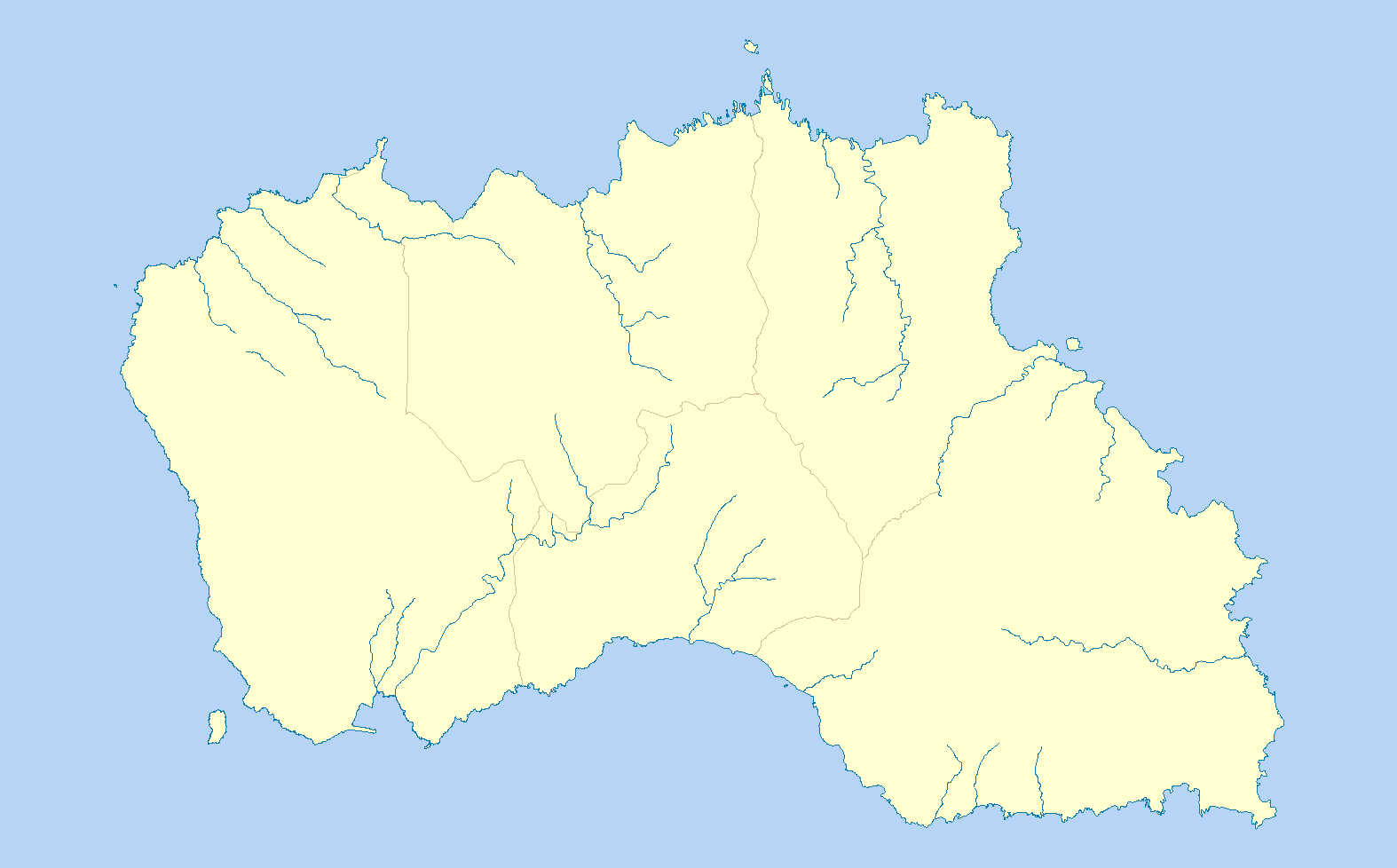
- Location of the chapel on the island of Santa Maria

General information
- Type: Hermitage
- Architectural style: Medieval
- Location: Anjos (Vila do Porto), Vila do Porto, Portugal
- Coordinates: 37°0′21.37″N 25°9′13.46″W
- Opened: c. 1439
- Owner: Câmara Municipal de Vila do Porto

Technical details
- Material: Basalt

The Hermitage of Nossa Senhora dos Anjos, is a hermitage/chapel located in the village of Anjos, on the northcoast of the civil parish of Vila do Porto (municipality of the same name), on the island of Santa Maria in the Portuguese Azores.

== History ==
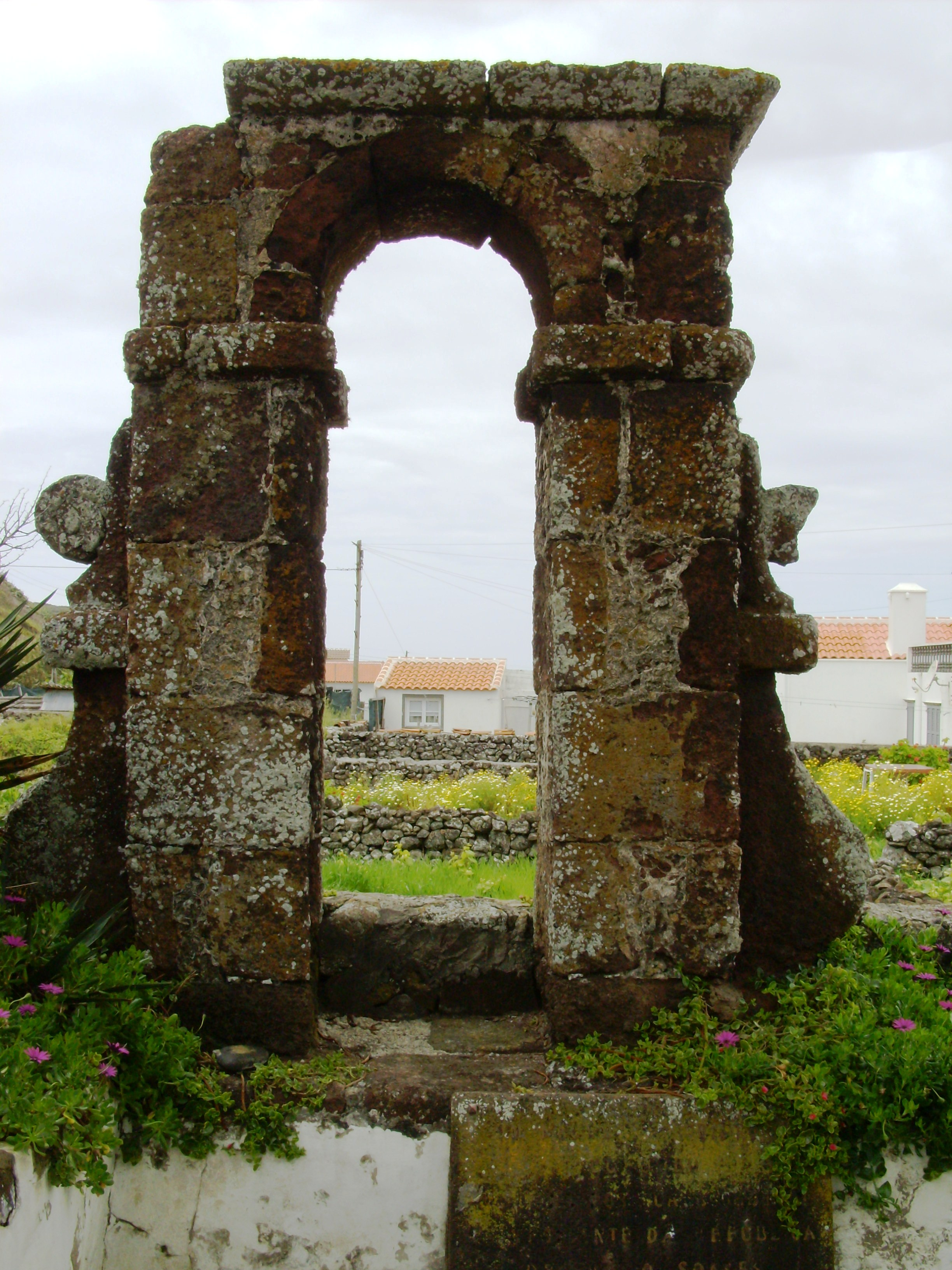
The only remnant of the original hermitage in Anjos a rock window-frame, on the site of the more recent chapel

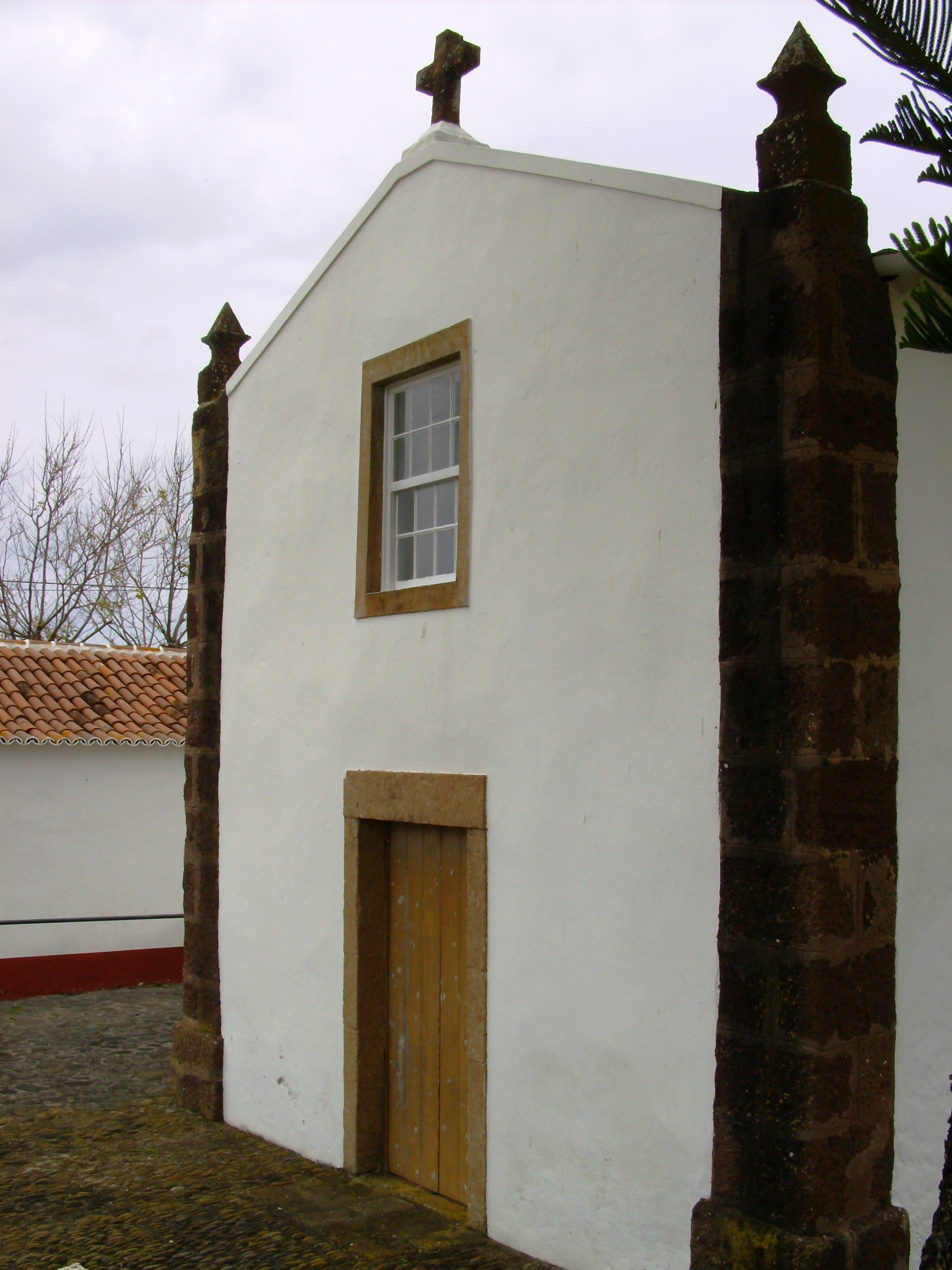
The simple front façade of the Chapel of Nossa Senhora dos Anjos, showing the corner pinnacles and cantilever roof

Although there are no clear indications to confirm that the chapel of Anjos was the first temple erected on the island of Santa Maria, a comparison of the first narratives about the early island's colonization allows most to assume that the hermitage in this village was the first constructed on the island. Consequently, owing to the island being the first location of an established settlement, it can be inferred that it was also the first religious building constructed in the Azores.

Erected in 1439, the first chapel was erected of wood, and covered in hay, but shortly replaced by a building constructed of dry set masonry between 1460 and 1474.

The principal resources about its history came from Father Francisco da Cunha Prestes, a university theologian (who attended the University of Evora from 1650–1653) and vicar of the Church of Nossa Senhora da Assunção (Vila do Porto). The manuscript, "Livro da Irmandade de Nossa Senhora dos Anjos e Escravos da Cadeinha", dated to 1676 and today part of the collection in the Archive of Vila do Porto, refers to the chapel. The chapel was founded by Isabel Gonçalves, wife of Tomé Afonso (from the Algarve), who purchased the land from Beatriz Godin (her cousin and wife of the second Captain-donotário João Soares de Albergaria) who provided three alqueires of land.

The attack and sacking of the island, in 1616, by Barbary coast pirates, taking with them captives, delayed any construction that may have occurred. Velho Arruda elaborated an event that lasted eight days, and resulted in 222 captives. Similarly, friar Agostinho de Monte Alverne credited the miraculous intervention of the Virgin, who did not want them "to see her church". Yet, the chapel must have escaped the Moors interests, because similarly, on 1 September 1675, another assault by pirates resulted in more captives (including women and children) but the building was not touched (if it existed in any recognizable form by this time). Yet, there are conflicting accounts stating that the chapel already had a defined boundary, although internally (by at least 1674) there was no retable with doors. Beatriz Godin died around 1492–1493, at that time living with her husband on the continent.

The explorer Cristopher Columbus ordered his sailors to land to celebrate a Mass of Thanksgiving, during their return voyage from the New World in February 1493. It is likely that Columbus' service was one of the first Masses held in the chapel.

The researcher Miguel Corte-Real (1995) suspects that Tomé Afonso and his wife Isabel Gonçalves were not the original founders, but likely more recent patrons of this chapel. He referred to a document listed in the Archives of Ponta Delgada (by Velho Arruda) that indicate that, at the time of their deaths, Tomé Afonso and Isabel Gonçalves left their property towards the conservation of the chapel.

It was remodelled between 1673 and 1676. In May 1675, the villagers opened a new trail that led from the escarpment to the chapel, followed in September by a religious procession to the chapel from a cross along the Caminho Velho. It was friar Gonçalo de São José who motivated the construction of the chapel, arriving from the Convent of São Francisco between 1668–1669, guiding the establishment of the Confraria dos Escravos da Cadeinha, confirmed in 1675 by the Bishop of Angra, Friar Lourenço de Castro. The establishment of this benevolent group directly succeeded the 1675 attack of the pirates.

By the end of the 19th century, the chapel underwent restoration (1893) resulting in the actual façade.

It was classified as a Property of Public Interest (Portuguese: Imóvel de Interesse Público) in a resolution No.58, adopted on 17 May 2001 by the Direcção-Geral dos Edifícios e Monumentos Nacionais (DGEMN) (General-Directorate for Buildings and National Monuments).

An annual festival in honour of the patron occurs on 21 August.

=== Legend of the Cruzeiro ===
A traditional legend explains the construction of hermitage and the cross that was located in the escarpment overlooking the temple. It was during the 16th century, when the residents of the local village wanted to construct a religious building in Anjos, the place where the navigator Gonçalo Velho Cabral had, along with his crew, disembarked and had a Mass in honour of their Atlantic discovery. The residents of the village believed that the best place would be in the lowlands, but the authorities responsible for the project did not understand the popular desire. In fact, the builders began constructing the church on the escarpment overlooking the popular location.

But, mysteriously, during the construction, the rocks deposited by the workers during the day were discovered in the lowlands rather than on the work site. Perturbed by the unexplainable phenomenon, the master planner accused the local population of moving the rocks during the night to the preferred location. But they continued to try to build the church on the escarpment, and every morning the rocks would appear around the present site, resulting in new accusations.

One night, as a fisherman was passing through the area, he heard some strange movement. Upon further investigation the old man discovered that the rocks were moving by themselves, and afraid, he ran to explain what he had seen to the master-builder, who ridiculed the fishermen. He also proposed investigating the following night. The next night the master-builder and his workmen were all in attendance when the rocks began to roll to the preferred building site of the local residents. Without any doubts, the project was moved to the area preferred by the Virgin, while a cross (Portuguese: cruzeiro) was erected in the original site proposed by the builders.

== Architecture ==
=== Exterior ===
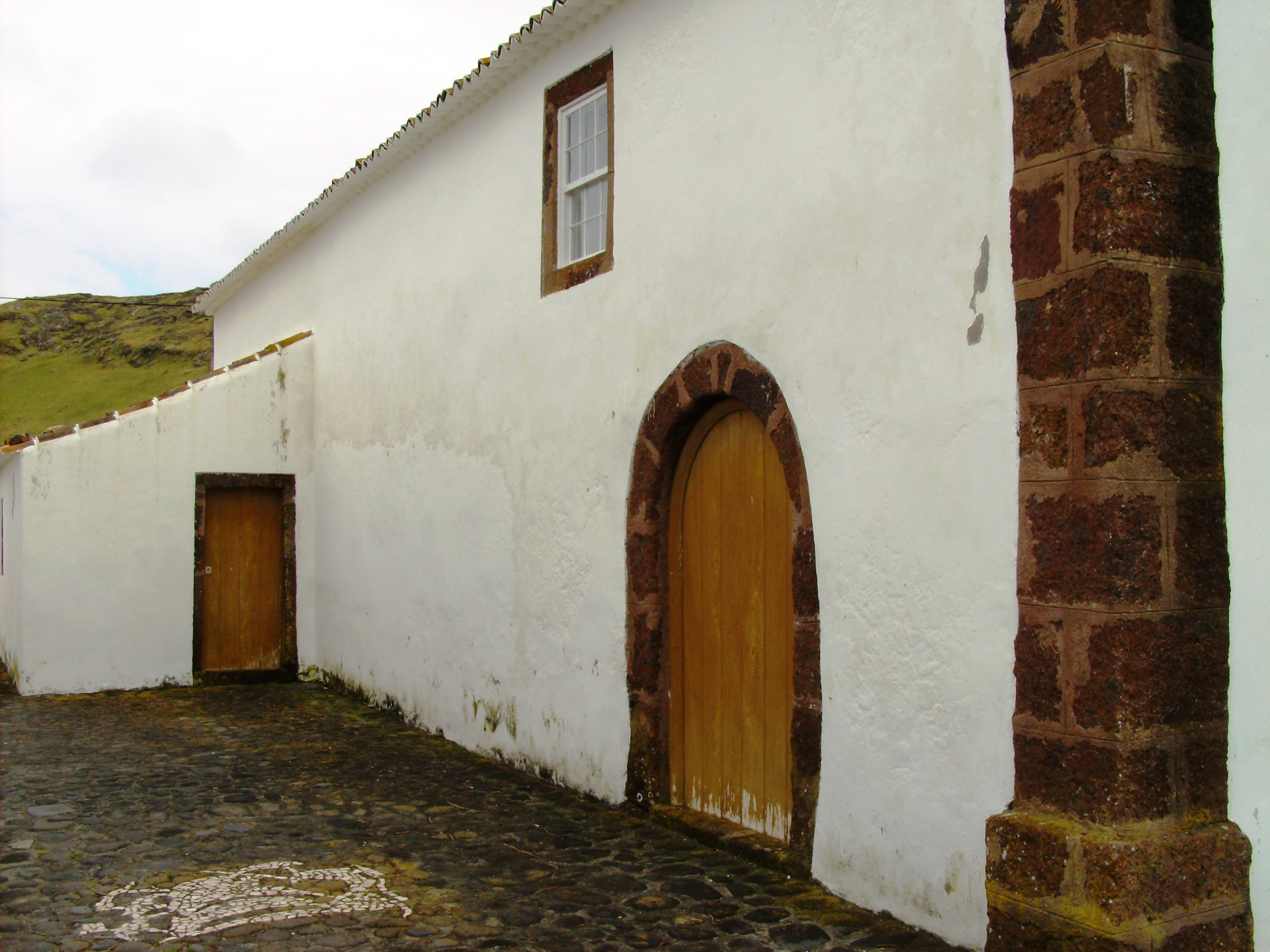
The lateral left wall of the chapel

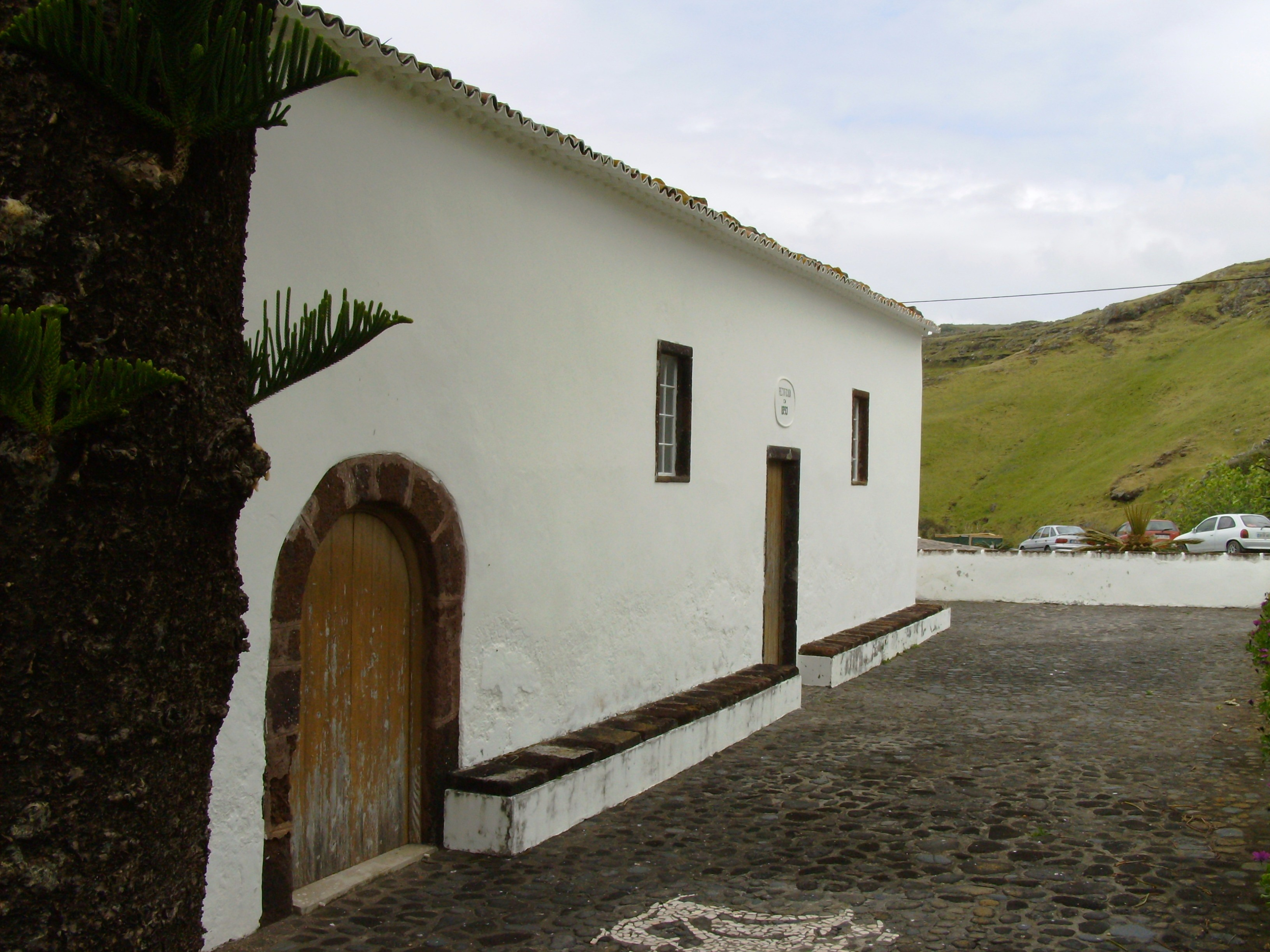
The lateral right wall of the chapel

The chapel is implanted in a walled churchyard and oriented west to east, with the main entranceway located on the western façade (to the rear of the property). This courtyard fronts the main roadway into Anjos, on the left-hand side of the main thoroughfare, across from a statue dedicated to Christopher Columbus (who stopped-off on his return from the New World).

The structure was constructed from recycled masonry stone, and constructed along a rectangular plan with the sacristy located on the left lateral wall. The main façade (western façade) is designed with a cantilever roof, its corners demarcated by pinnacles and a main small square door, surmounted by a double-paneguillotine-style window. Along the left lateral wall there is an arched doorway, while over the right lateral wall there is an inscription denoting the year of this reconstruction ("RECTIFICADA / EM / 1893"). The roof tiles are the double-tiled interlocking variety with a double edge protection.

On the western edge of the property there remains a vestige of the older hermitage: isolated on the left-hand side of the property within the churchyard is a window-like arch built into the wall built from masonry rock (remnants of a structure that held the church bell).

To the rear of the chapel (in the front of the property), the building includes a small, rectangular, open-air treatro delimited by a small wall with balusters (three on the façade and one on either lateral wall), with an open doorway.

=== Interior ===
Within its unique nave, the altar is decorated with polychromatic azulejo tile and pulpit completed in turned woodbalusters. Over the main entrance (in the western façade) is a high-choir, while the main altar (on the opposite wall) is highlighted by an image of the Virgin and a triptych from the 16th century. In detail:

- the triptych, painted on cedrus, dating back to the 16th century, by unknown painter, showing a representation of the Holy Family (Portuguese: Sagrada Família) in the central panel, while on the lateral panels the martyrs Saints Cosmas and Damian. A legend once existed that the triptych was used by Gonçalo Velho Cabral as a portable altar on board his caravel. The retable on where it is located was executed in the Convent of São Francisco in Vila do Porto around 1675.
- the image of Nossa Senhora dos Anjos (English: Our Lady of Angels), dating to the 17th century, and sculpted in cedrus by friar Manuel de São Domingos, commissioned by the Brotherhood of Prostrated Slaves (Portuguese: Irmandade dos Escravos da Cadeinha).
- a panel of polychromatic azulejos around the altar, which pertains to the 17th century, and presented in 1679 by the Mariense Brás de Andrade Velho, prior of the Colegiada de São Cristóvão de Coimbra. With a theme of birds and branches, the design also includes a figure of Saint Blaise (Portuguese: São Brás).

Also, in the sacristy is an inscription that refers back to the pirate attacks by the Moors in 1616 and 1675:

On the night of the first to second day of September 1675, the Moors assaulted the site of this Hermitage through fault of the guards, whom entered through the door, captured eleven, between them women and children and with this whip they man-handled them, who placed it here to remember their success, those who so that your preaching to God will soon lift the punishment and may not involve more innocents; yet, left behind on land the whip that punished. They did not touch this chapel, passing around her; and as in 1616, they plundered the whole island by tradition, they did not see everyone who was [hidden] within.
