= Lagar of Diogo Fernandes Faleiro =

- Lagar de Diogo Fernandes Faleiro
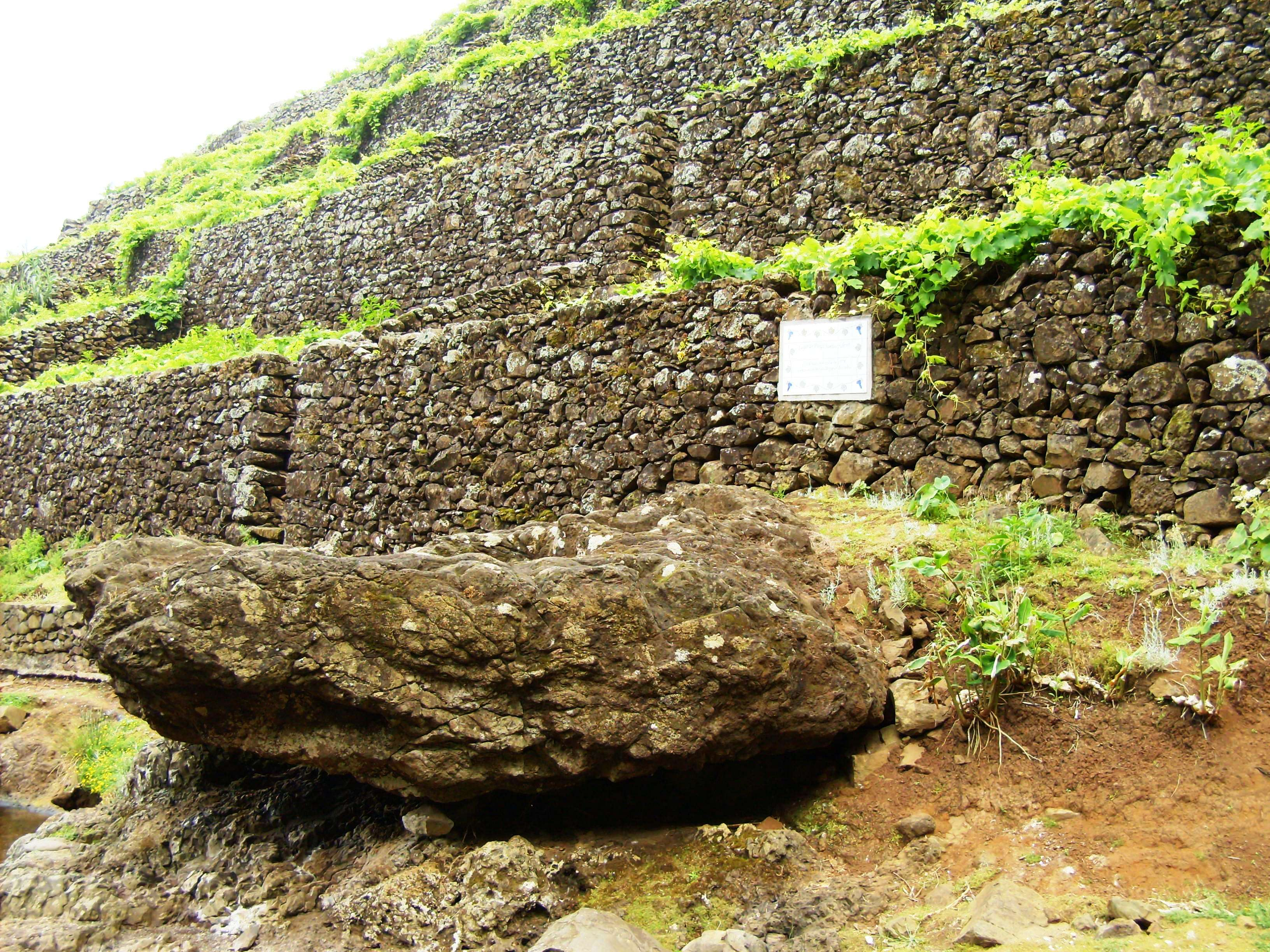
- The large pressing-stone used in crushing grapes

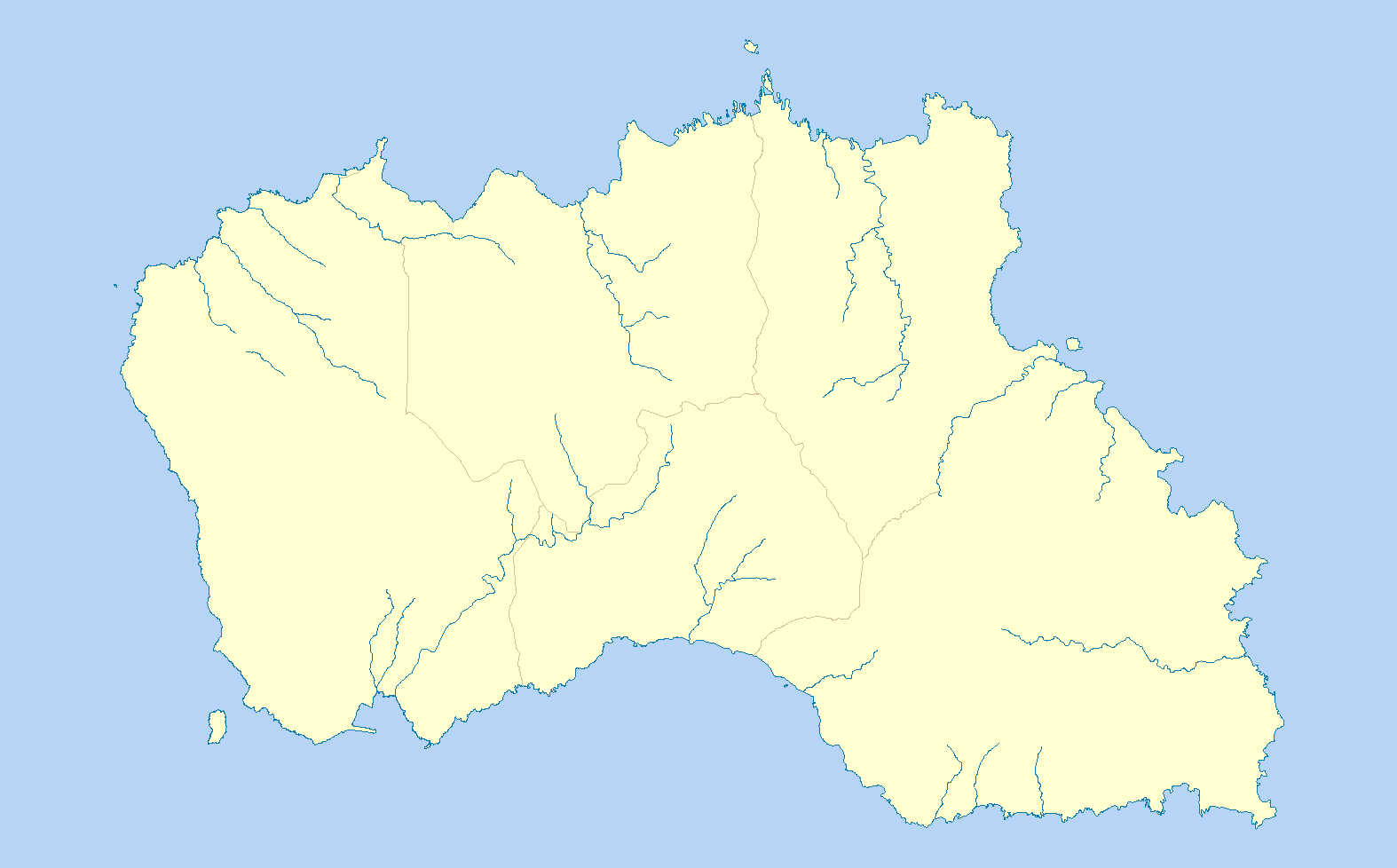
- Location of the lagar on the island of Santa Maria

General information
- Type: Winepress
- Architectural style: Modern
- Location: Maia, Portugal
- Coordinates: 36°56′52.7″N 25°1′10.3″W
- Owner: Portuguese Republic

Design and construction
- Architect: Diogo Fernandes Faleiro

The Lagar of Diogo Fernandes Faleiro (Portuguese: Lagar de Diogo Fernandes Faleiro) is an ancient winepress, hewn from riverbank rocks, situated in the civil parish of Santo Espírito in the municipality of Vila do Porto, in the Portuguese archipelago of the Azores.

== History ==
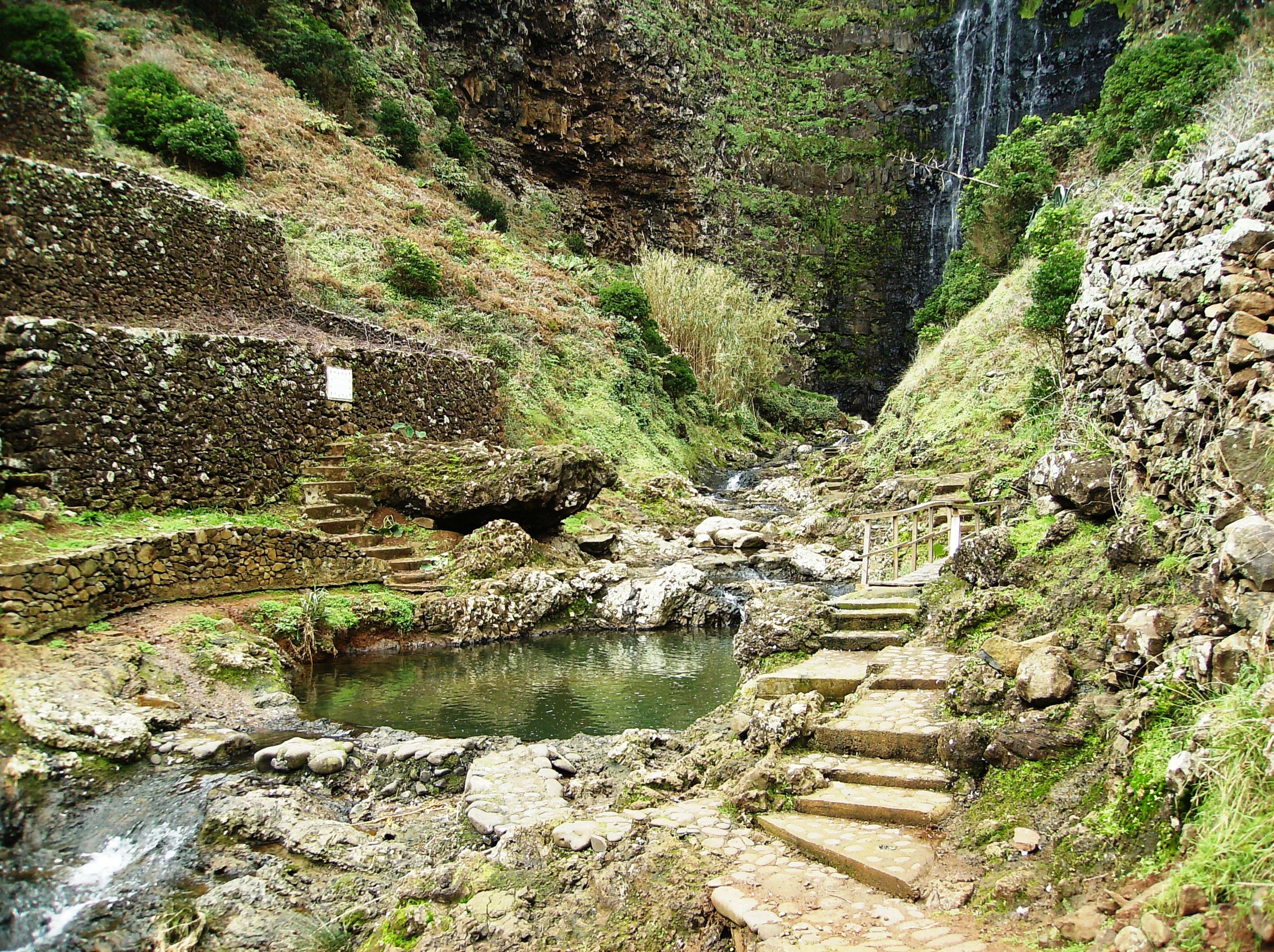
A view of either bank of the Ribeira de Aveiro (with the lagar centred), showing the waterfall of Aveiro in the right background

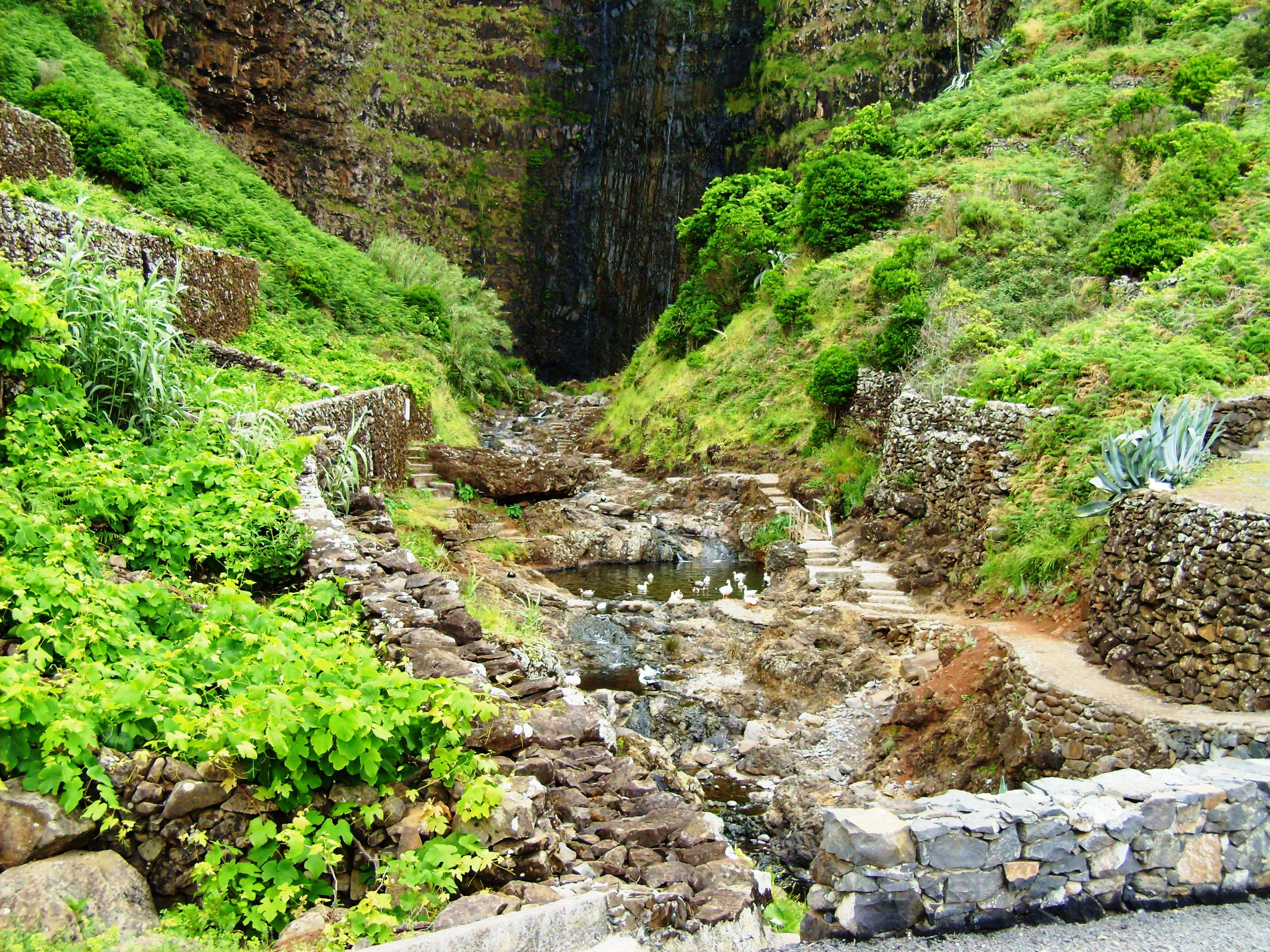
The delineated watercourse, with vineyards on either side

Constructed after 1579 by Diogo Fernandes Faleiro, the press was known for producing 11,000 litres (2,900 US gal) of wine annually.

As the chronicler Gaspar Frutuoso described him:

The same Diogo Fernandes Faleiro has made in his vineyard, in the middle of cliffs, a lagar of just rock, very well made, where he produces all his wine, and the same, in the year 1579 (which can not be passed without silence, a work so praised), is very sterile, as others were...

This property-owner was integral in the Azorean colonization of Brazil, supporting the immigration of family members and impoverished local residents to Brazil during the 16th century. Frutuoso also expanded its owner, stating his philanthropic works associated with early migration:

...that the islanders were so afflicted and poor, that they could not stay [on the island], he saw some of his relatives in similar distress, persuaded them that if, they wanted to get out of their misery, and if, they wanted to move to Brazil,...he would provide them with all necessities for their boat, 200,000 reis, [this] even as he was not rich, he was able to do this great charity, without notable work or expense from his estate, helping them and, in addition to the said expenditure, with his diligences and his preoccupation, on boarding animating them with great fervour and charity.

== Architecture ==
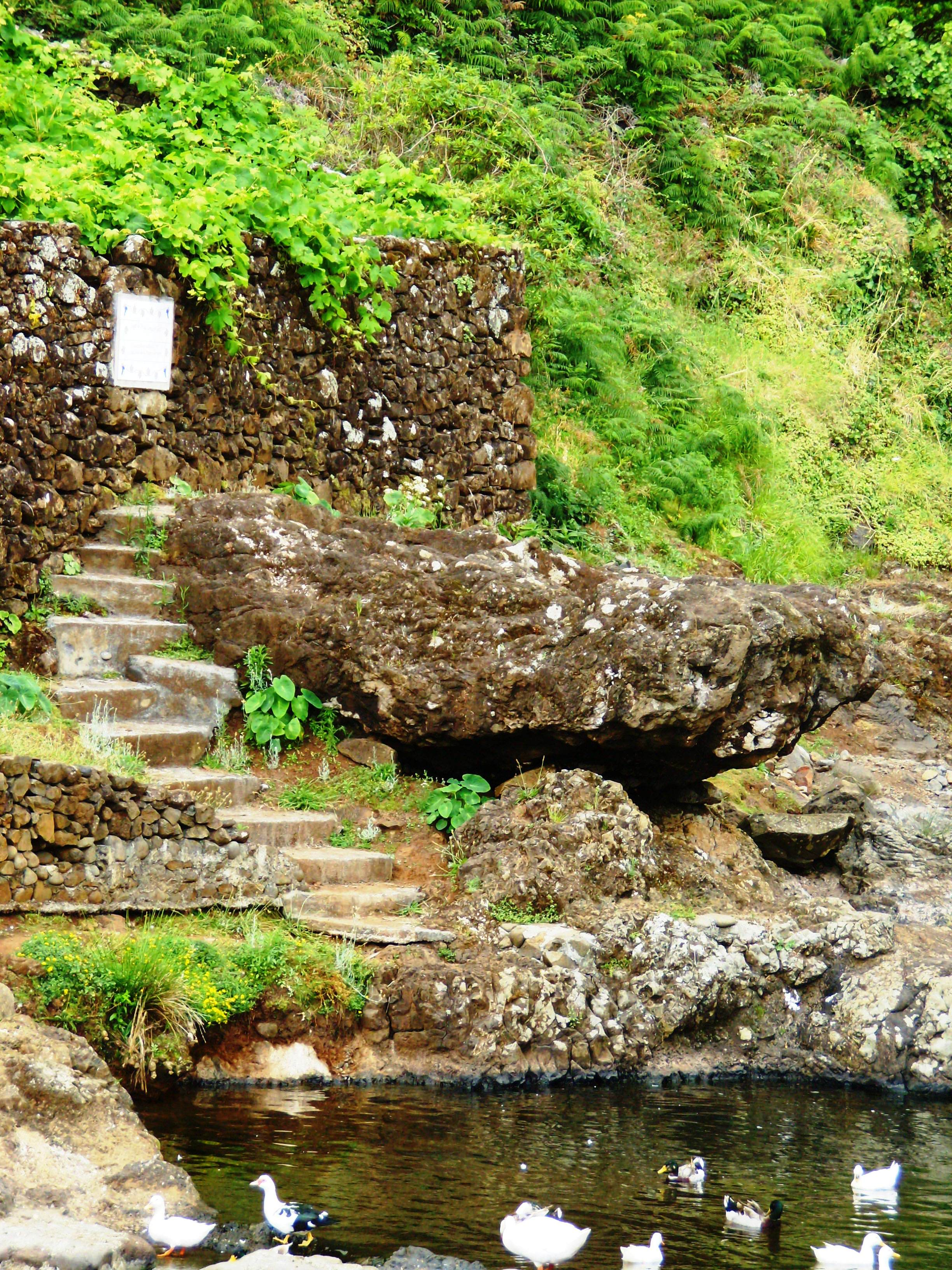
The lagar and the terraces along the ravine bank (including gate)

The lagar is located at the mouth of the Ribeira de Aveiro, in the village of Maia, on the southwestern coast of the island. It is situated at the base of a high cliff, where the waterfall of Aveiro cascades to the ravine floor, then on to the sea.

The wine-press is an archaic form hewn from a large boulder and rocks along the ravine's left bank. It is identifiable for the roughly square basin that was used to collect and press grapes, with an opening from where the juice was extracted.
