= São Pedro (Vila do Porto) =

- Civil parish
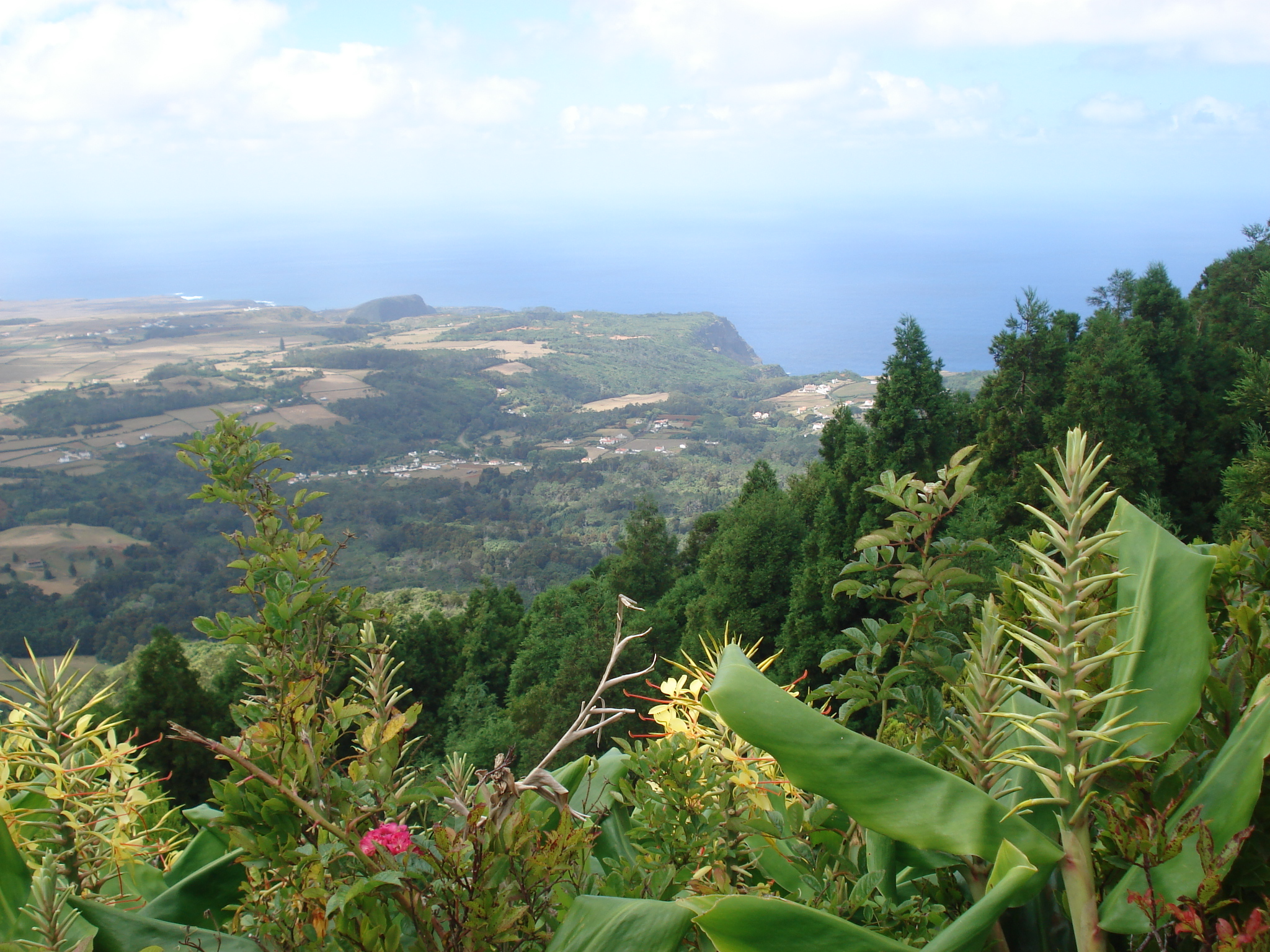
- The northern coastal frontier of São Pedro, as seen from Pico Alto, island of Santa Maria

- Location of the civil parish of São Pedro within the municipality of Vila do Porto
- Coordinates: 36°59′1″N 25°7′12″W
- Country: Portugal
- Auton. region: Azores
- Island: Santa Maria
- Municipality: Vila do Porto

Area
  - Total: 18.17 km^{2} (7.02 sq mi)
- Elevation: 210 m (690 ft)

Population (2011)
  - Total: 841
  - Density: 46.3/km^{2} (120/sq mi)
- Time zone: UTC−01:00 (AZOT)
  - Summer (DST): UTC+00:00 (AZOST)
- Postal code: 9580-332
- Area code: 292
- Patron: São Pedro

São Pedro (Portuguese pronunciation: [sɐ̃w ˈpeðɾu]) is a Portuguese civil parish, located in the municipality of Vila do Porto, in the Portuguese autonomous region of Azores. The population in 2011 was 841, in an area of 18.17 km^{2}. It consists of the localities Atafona, Alto do Nascente, Bananeiras, Canavais, Chão do João Tomé, Covões, Faneca, Feteiras de Baixo, Feteiras de Cima, Jogo, Outeiro, Paul de Baixo, Paul de Cima, Ribeira do Engenho, Roças, São Pedro, Trevina and Pilar.

== History ==
The first recorded birth in this region, Margarida Afonso, occurred in the locality of Paul.

São Pedro was chronologically the fourth ecclesiastical parish to be created (in 1603), following the pastoral visit of the D. Jerónimo Teixeira Cabral, the Bishop of Angra. Its creation was confirmed by Philip II on 5 March 1611. The first seat of the parish was the Church of São Pedro, in the area of Pedras de São Pedro, which Gaspar Frutuoso referred to as one of four hermitages that existed, near the village, situated ahead of the Church of Santo Antão.

Philip III, by regal decree, on 4 April 1623, accepted the petition of the vicar and inhabitants in São Pedro, authorized a donation for the public works on the hermitage in Pedras de São Pedro, which were declared necessary, after the visit of then-Bishop Pedro da Costa.

This hermitage had served as the parish seat until 1698, the year that by virtue of its population increase, a new church was opened in the locality of Rosa Alta to serve the local population.

Due to the rich, fertile soils, São Pedro was always an agricultural centre, and basis for their economy. This allowed the continued prosperity of its signeurial holdings, and characterized by large manorhouses (Portuguese: solares) with their own chapels.

== Architecture ==
=== Civic ===
- Fountain of São José (Portuguese: Fonte de São José)

=== Religious ===
- Church of São Pedro (Portuguese: Igreja Paroquial de São Pedro/Igreja de São Pedro e Treatro)
- Hermitage of Nossa Senhora da Fátima (Portuguese: Ermida de Nossa Senhora de Fátima)
- Hermitage of Nossa Senhora da Saúde (Portuguese: Ermida de Nossa Senhora da Saúde)
- Hermitage of Nossa Senhora da Monserrate (Portuguese: Ermida de Nossa Senhora da Monserrate)
- Hermitage of Nossa Senhora do Pilar (Portuguese: Ermida de Nossa Senhora do Pilar)
- Império of the Holy Spirit of the Miracles (Portuguese: Império do Espírito Santo dos Milagres/Treatro do Espírito Santo dos Milagres)
