= Vila do Porto =

- Municipality
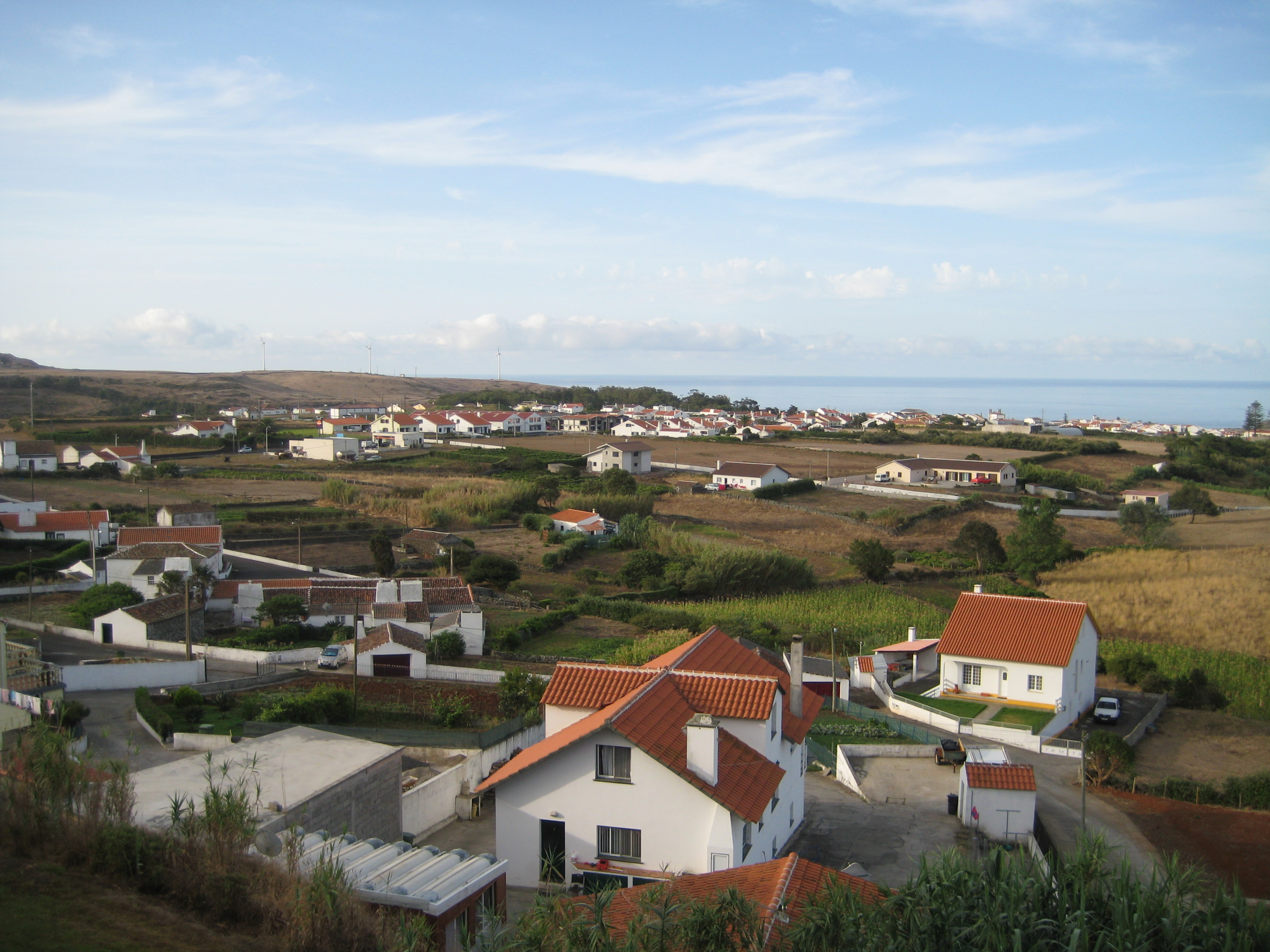
- View of Vila do Porto from outside of the Hotel Colombo

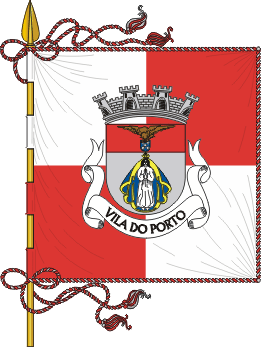
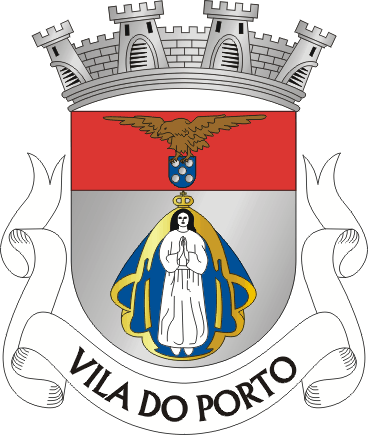
- Flag Coat of arms
- Interactive map of Vila do Porto
- Coordinates: 36.948°N 25.145°W
- Country: Portugal
- Auton. region: Azores
- Island: Santa Maria
- Settled: c. 1460
- Parishes: 5 civil parishes: Almagreira; Santa Bárbara; Santo Espírito; São Pedro; Vila do Porto

Government
  - Type: Municipal Chamber
  - Chamber Pres.: Bárbara Pereira Torres de Medeiros Chaves
  - Assembly Pres.: João Manuel Andrade Fontes
  - Council Pres.: Maria Dulce de Oliveira Resendes

Area
  - Total: 96.89 km^{2} (37.41 sq mi)
- Elevation: 242 m (794 ft)

Population (2021)
  - Total: 5,408
  - Density: 55.82/km^{2} (144.6/sq mi)
- Time zone: UTC-01:00 (AZOT)
  - Summer (DST): UTC±00:00 (AZOST)
- Postal code: 9580-539
- Area code: 292
- Patron: Our Lady of the Assumption
- Local holiday: August 15
- Website: cm-viladoporto.pt

Vila do Porto (Portuguese pronunciation: [ˈvilɐ ðu ˈpoɾtu]; "Port Town") is the single municipality, the name of the main town and one of the civil parishes on the island of Santa Maria, in the Portuguese archipelago of Azores. Its nearest neighbor, administratively, is the municipality of Povoação on the southern coast of São Miguel (to the northwest), and it is physically southwest of the islets of the Formigas. The population in 2021 was 5,408, in an area of 96.89 km^{2} (37.41 sq mi).

== History ==
Santa Maria was the first island in the archipelago to be discovered by Diogo Silves in 1427. By 2 July 1439, a royal charter from Infante D. Pedro, regent of D. Afonso V, referred to the fact that Prince Henry the Navigator had ordered that sheep be set ashore along the seven islands of the Azores (since Corvo and Flores had, at the time, not been discovered). São Miguel and Santa Maria were the first islands to be settled by families from Estremadura, Alto Alentejo and Algarve, facilitated by Gonçalo Velho, then first donatary-captain of the Azores. Gonçalo Velho Cabral, nobleman in the House of the Infante D. Henrique (Henry the Navigator) and commander in the Order of Christ, arrived on the island of Santa Maria in 1432. In the cartography of the 14th Century, the island was referred to as Ilha dos Lobos (Island of Wolves, referring to the wolf seals that lived in the region at the time). It became the seat of the first Captaincy of the Azores, which initially included both Santa Maria and São Miguel.

Its first settlement originated in 1439, with the occupation of Praia dos Lobos (and eventually became the northern coastal village of Anjos). Around 1450, was the probably foundation of the settlement of Porto, by Fernão de Quental. Quental's colony was established along the south coast along an escarpment overlooking a small bay that afforded protection for ships: what would become known as the Vila do Porto (town of the port). This town would become incorporated in 1470, when the town of Porto received the obligatory and first foral (charter), in addition to the establishment of the first lighthouse in the Azores. Although never experiencing earthquakes since its initial settlement (in comparison to the other islands in the Azores), the community was always marked by isolation, inaccessibility and weak defensive position.

It was, by the beginning of the 17th century, the fortification of São Brás along the cliff-tops of Cimo da Rocha, was constructed, near the hermitage dedicated to Our Lady of the Conception.

In 1901, it received an official visit from King Carlos I of Portugal and Queen Amélie, and later that year elected the first Republican municipal government.

Between 1942 and 1944, in the context of the Second World War, the airport was constructed to provide support and emergency facilities for the island. This airport was transferred to the Portuguese Air Force in 1946, and the barrio (Bairro do Aeroporto) was begun by architect Keil do Amaral.

On 21 October 1992, the historical centre was protected, a zone delimited by Vila do Porto, under Regional Legislative Decree 22/92/A. By 24 August 2004, a new document was published by the regional legislature (Decree 29/2004/A), that set out the jurisdictional regime to protect, conserve and promote the cultural heritage; classified under article 58, the "historic centre" of Vila do Porto, was reclassified as a Group of Public Interest, and the older protections revoked.

== Geography ==
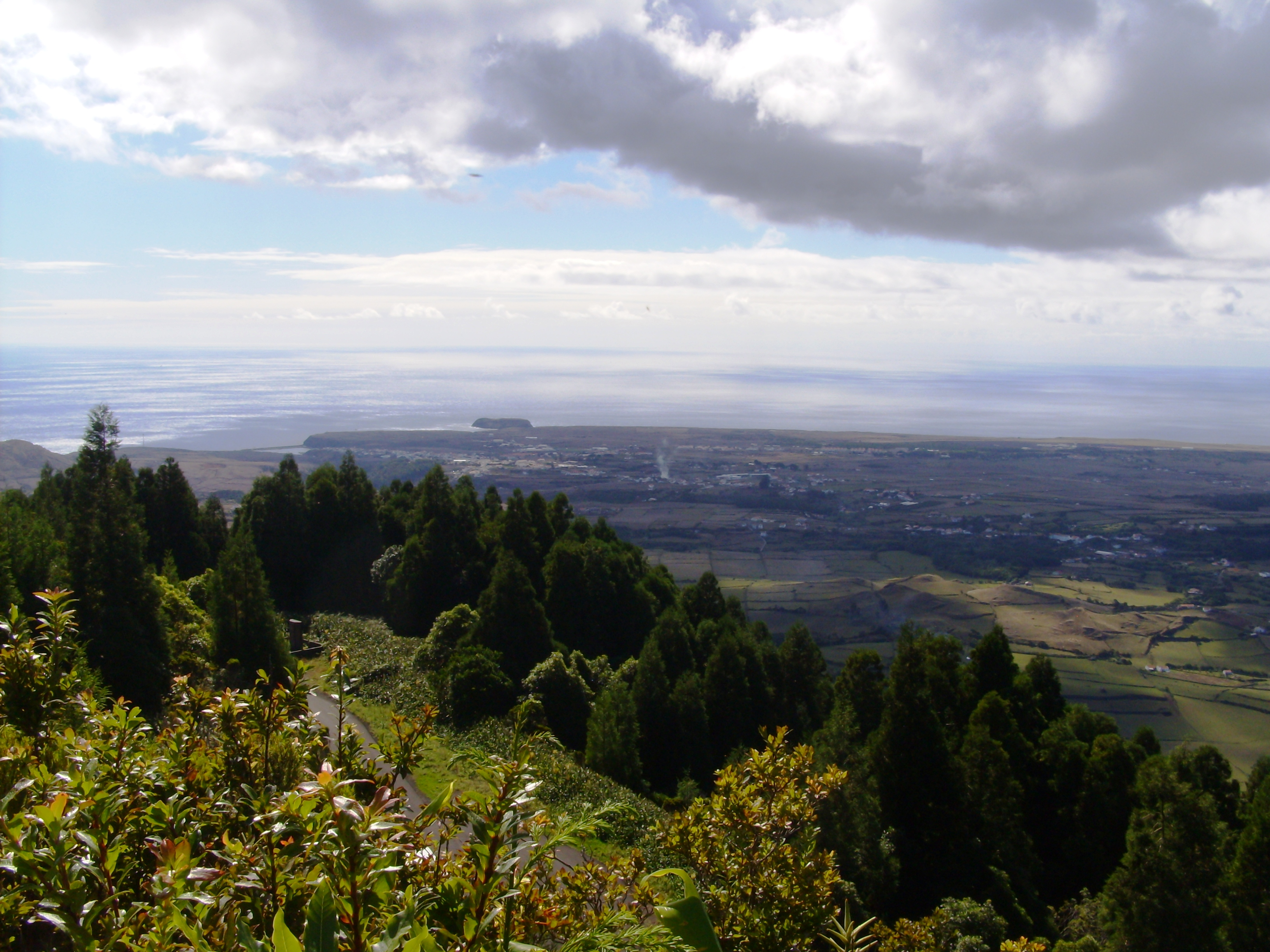
From Pico Alto, the view of the main settlement of the island of Santa Maria, the community of Vila do Porto

The municipality covers the entirety of the island of Santa Maria, in the eastern edge of the archipelago of the Azores. Nascently a coastal municipality, the settlements are nonetheless located over a cliff-top platform, dominated in the west by a semi-arid plain and in the east by the hugged flanks of the Pico Alto mountainous ridge. Although its principal urban area is located along linear tracts in the southwestern coast (oriented north to south), there exist various urban settlements and agglomerations throughout the island.

The municipality incorporates the island of Santa Maria in its entirety, and is divided into five parishes (population in 2021):

- Almagreira – 617 residents / 11.22 km^{2} (4.33 sq mi)
- Santa Bárbara – 370 residents / 15.27 km^{2} (5.90 sq mi)
- Santo Espírito – 597 residents / 26.68 km^{2} (10.30 sq mi)
- São Pedro – 812 residents / 18.17 km^{2} (7.02 sq mi)
- Vila do Porto – 3,012 residents / 25.55 km^{2} (9.86 sq mi)

=== Sister city ===
Vila do Porto's sister city is:

- (United States) Hudson, Massachusetts, USA

== Architecture ==
=== Civic ===
- Administrative Building of the Forest Service of Vila do Porto (Portuguese: Edifício da Administração Florestal de Vila do Porto)
- Barracks of the Fiscal Guard (Portuguese: Quartel de Posto da Guarda Fiscal, GF, de Vila do Porto)
- Fountain of Largo Coronel Costa Santos (Portuguese: Chafariz do Largo Coronel Costa Santos)
- Fountain of Largo Luís Figueiredo (Portuguese: Chafariz do Largo Luís Figueiredo)
- Fountain of Largo Jaime Figueiredo (Portuguese: Chafariz no Largo Jaime Figueiredo)
- Fountain of São José (Portuguese: Fonte de São José)
- Lagar of Diogo Fernandes Faleiro (Portuguese: Lagar de Diogo Fernandes Faleiro), located in São Lourenço (Santa Bárbara); carved volcanic rocks used for squeezing grapes into wine.
- Lighthouse of Gonçalo Velho (Portuguese: Farol de Gonçalo Velho/Farol da Maia), also referred to as lighthouse of Maia, is located in Maia (Santo Espírito);
- LORAN Station of Santa Maria (Portuguese: Estação LORAN de Santa Maria), located in the locality of Norte, Santa Bárbara; the long-range navigation station was operated by NATO, deactivated and in ruins since 1980.
- Manorhouse of João Falcão de Sousa (Portuguese: Solar João Falcão de Sousa/Biblioteca Municipal de Vila do Porto)
- Manorhouse/Chapel of Santa Rita (Portuguese: Solar e Ermida de Santa Rita), a private residence situated near Carreira (Almagreira)
- Museum of Santa Maria (Portuguese: Casas na Rua dos Esquecidos/Museu de Santa Maria)
- Primary School and Cantina of Vila do Porto (Portuguese: Escolas Primárias e Cantina de Vila do Porto)
- Public Washhouse of Santo António (Portuguese: Lavadouro Municipal de Santo António)
- Residence of Captain João Soares de Sousa, 3rd Captain-Donatário (Portuguese: Casa do 3º Donatário da Ilha de Santa Maria), located in Vila do Porto; a villa of one of the island's Captains-major, who governed in the name of the crown;
- Residence of Father Manuel (Portuguese: Casa de Pe. Manuel)
- Whale-Processing Station/Factory of Santo Espírito, located in Maia (Santo Espírito); in ruins since whale-hunting was prohibited
- Windmill of Ginjal (Portuguese: Moinho de vento do Ginjal)

=== Military ===
- Fort of Baía de São Lourenço (Portuguese: Forte da Baía de São Lourença), located in São Lourenço (Santa Bárbara); ruins (mostly rock) of fort situated beside port of São Lourenço.
- Fort of Baixa do Vigário (Portuguese: Forte da Baixa do Vigário), located in Praia Formosa (Almagreira); ruins of fort east of the Bay of Praia.
- Fort of Figueiral (Portuguese: Forte do Figueiral), located in Figuerial (Vila do Porto); ruins overlooking the Ponte do Figueiral
- Fort of Forca (Portuguese: Forte da Forca)
- Fort of Laje de Vila do Porto (Portuguese: Forte de Laje de Vila do Porto), located in Vila do Porto
- Fort of Maia (Portuguese: Forte da Maia), located in Maia (Santo Espírito)
- Fort of Prainha (Portuguese: Forte da Prainha)
- Fort of Nossa Senhora da Praia dos Anjos (Portuguese: Forte de Nossa Senhora da Praia dos Anjos)
- Fort of São Brás (Portuguese: Forte de São Brás), built in the 16th century, during Spanish occupation, location of the Chapel of Nossa Senhora da Conceição and obelisk to the memory of the crew of the warship NRP Carvalho Araújo.
- Fort of São João Baptista of Praia Formosa (Portuguese: Forte de São João Baptista da Praia Formosa)
- Fort of São João Evangelista (Portuguese: Forte de São João Evangelista)
- Fort of Cabrestante (Portuguese: Forte de Cabrestantes)
- Fort of Marvão (Portuguese: Forte de Marvão)

=== Religious ===
- Church of Nossa Senhora do Ar (Portuguese: Igreja de Nossa Senhora do Ar), located near Santa Maria airport (Ginjal), Vila do Porto
- Church of Nossa Senhora da Assunção (Portuguese: Igreja Paroquial de Vila do Porto/Igreja de Nossa Senhora da Assunção), located centrally in Vila do Porto; built in the 15th century and remodeled in the 16th century.
- Church of Nossa Senhora do Bom Despacho (Portuguese: Igreja Paroquial de Almagreira/Igreja de Nossa Senhora do Bom Despacho), constructed under the orders of Manuel de Moura and his wife, Inês Pereira, in the early 18th century, and evolved into the parochial church of Almagreira;
- Church of Nossa Senhora da Purificação (Portuguese: Igreja Paroquial do Santo Espírito/Igreja de Nossa Senhora da Purificação), located in Santo Espírito
- Church of Santa Bárbara (Portuguese: Igreja Paroquial de Santa Bárbara/Igreja de Santa Bárbara), dating to the middle of the 17th century, the parochial church of Santa Bárbara is marked by presbytery and lateral angular chapels;
- Church of Santo Antão (Portuguese: Igreja de Santo Antão), located in the Largo de Santo Antão, Vila do Porto
- Church of São Pedro (Portuguese: Igreja Paroquial de São Pedro/Igreja de São Pedro e Treatro), located in Largo da Igreja, São Pedro
- Church of the Misericórdia (Portuguese: Igreja da Misericórdia de Vila do Porto/Igreja do Senhor dos Passos)
- Convent of São Francisco/Municipal Palace/Hall of Vila do Porto (Portuguese: Convento de São Francisco/Igreja de Nossa Senhora da Vitória) - located in Vila do Porto; constructed in the 17th century, containing ornate azulejo tiles of the period, today housing the seat of the municipality of Vila do Porto, addorsed to this, is the Chapel of Nossa Senhora da Vitória.
- Hermitage of Corpo Santo/São Pedro Gonçalves Telmo (Portuguese: Ermida do Corpo Santo/Ermida de São Pedro Gonçalves Telmo), located beside the Largo Sousa e Silva (Vila do Porto)
- Hermitage of Jesus, Maria and Joseph (Portuguese: Ermida de Jesus, Maria, José) - located in São Lourenço (Santa Bárbara)
- Hermitage of Mãe de Deus (Portuguese: Ermida da Mãe de Deus), located in Vila do Porto
- Hermitage of Nossa Senhora dos Anjos (Portuguese: Ermida de Nossa Senhora dos Anjos/Ermida dos Anjos e Treatro) - located in Anjos (Vila do Porto); considered the oldest religious structure on the island, where Christopher Columbus celebrated a mass in honor of his discovery in the New World.
- Hermitage of Nossa Senhora da Boa Morte (Portuguese: Ermida de Nossa Senhora da Boa Morte), located in Santo Espírito
- Hermitage of Nossa Senhora da Boa Nova (Portuguese: Ermida de Nossa Senhora da Boa Nova), located in Vila do Porto
- Hermitage of Nossa Senhora da Boa Viagem (Portuguese: Ermida de Nossa Senhora da Boa Viagem/Ermida de Santa Ana), located near Santana (Vila do Porto)
- Hermitage of Nossa Senhora da Conceição (Portuguese: Ermida de Nossa Senhora da Conceição/Ermida de Nossa Senhora da Conceição da Rocha), located in Largo Sousa e Silva, attached to the Fort of São Brás (Vila do Porto)
- Hermitage of Nossa Senhora do Desterro (Portuguese: Ermida de Nossa Senhora do Desterro), located in Desterro, São Lourenço (Santa Bárbara)
- Hermitage of Nossa Senhora de Fátima (Portuguese: Ermida de Nossa Senhora de Fátima), located in Fátima (São Pedro); in 1925, the first chapel to be constructed following the visions at Cova de Iria (Fátima)
- Hermitage of Nossa Senhora da Glória (Portuguese: Ermida de Nossa Senhora da Glória), located in Glória (Santo Espírito)
- Hermitage of Nossa Senhora da Graça (Portuguese: Ermida de Nossa Senhora da Graça), located in Almagreira
- Hermitage of Nossa Senhora do Livramento (Portuguese: Ermida de Nossa Senhora do Livramento), located along Rua do Livramento, Vila do Porto
- Hermitage of Nossa Senhora de Lourdes (Portuguese: Ermida de Nossa Senhora de Lourdes), located in Norte (Santa Bárbara), the isolated single-nave hermitage in the region of Norte, is known for its main altar, constructed using volcanic stone, resembling the grotto where the Marian apparition occurred in Lourdes, France;
- Hermitage of Nossa Senhora de Monserrate (Portuguese: Ermida de Nossa Senhora de Monserrate), located in Paul (São Pedro)
- Hermitage of Nossa Senhora do Monte (Portuguese: Ermida de Nossa Senhora do Monte), located in the (private) Quinta do Monte (Almagreira)
- Hermitage of Nossa Senhora da Piedade (Portuguese: Ermida de Nossa Senhora da Piedade), located in Malbusca (Santo Espírito)
- Hermitage of Nossa Senhora do Pilar (Portuguese: Ermida de Nossa Senhora do Pilar), located in Pilar (São Pedro)
- Hermitage of Nossa Senhora dos Prazeres (Portuguese: Ermida de Nossa Senhora dos Prazeres), located in Maia (Santo Espírito)
- Hermitage of Nossa Senhora dos Remédios (Portuguese: Ermida de Nossa Senhora dos Remédios/Ermida de Santo Amaro), located in Praia Formosa (Almagreira)
- Hermitage of Nossa Senhora da Saúde (Portuguese: Ermida de Nossa Senhora da Saúde), located in São Pedro
- Hermitage of Santo Amaro (Portuguese: Ermida de Nossa Senhora dos Remédios/Ermida de Santo Amaro), dedicated to Saint Maurus (but, later to Our Lady of Medicine), this simple, coastal chapel is located alongside Ribeira da Praia, of plastered masonry brickwork. The single-nave chapel includes well-preserved wood pulpit, designed in the Baroque-style and ancillary sacristy.
- Hermitage of Santo António (Portuguese: Ermida de Santo António), located in Santo António (Santo Espírito)
- Hermitage of São Lourenço (Portuguese: Ermida de São Lourenço), located in São Lourenço (Santa Bárbara)
- Império of the Holy Spirit of Boa Viagem (Portuguese: Império do Espírito Santo da Boa Viagem/Treatro do Espírito Santo da Boa Viagem)
- Império of the Holy Spirit of Milagres (Portuguese: Império do Espírito Santo dos Milagres/Treatro do Espírito Santo dos Milagres)
- Império of the Holy Spirit of Nossa Senhora da Glória (Portuguese: Império do Espírito Santo de Nossa Senhora da Glória/Treatro do Espírito Santo de Nossa Senhora da Glória)* Império of the Holy Spirit of Piedade (Portuguese: Império do Espírito Santo da Piedade/Treatro do Espírito Santo da Piedade e Copeira)
- Império of the Holy Spirit of Salvaterra (Portuguese: Império do Espírito Santo no Lugar de Salvaterra/Treatro do Espírito Santo no Lugar de Salvaterra)
- Império of the Holy Spirit of Santa Bárbara (Portuguese: Império do Espírito Santo de Santa Bárbara/Treatro do Espírito Santo de Santa Bárbara), the small, unimposing treatro or chapel dedicated to the annual celebrations of the Cult of the Holy Spirit, was dedicated in 1900, to replace existent temporary structures. The simple one-room space includes altar and space for the artifacts of the religious and ceremonial processions held throughout the period following Pentecost Sunday;
- Império of the Holy Spirit of Santo Antão (Portuguese: Império do Espírito Santo de Santo Antão/Treatro do Espírito Santo de Santo Antão)
- Império of the Holy Spirit of Santo António (Portuguese: Império do Espírito Santo de Santo António/Treatro do Espírito Santo de Santo António e Copeira)
- Recolhimento de Santa Maria Madalena, located in Vila do Porto; constructed in 1594 by Father Corvelo Resende who, along with his brothers decided to establish a monastery to the Order of Santa Clara. The first mass was celebrated in 1600.
- Recolhimento de Santo António, located in Vila do Porto
- Way of the Cross of Vila do Porto (Portuguese: Passos da Via Sacra de Vila do Porto)
