= João Pedro =

João Pedro may refer to:

== Footballers ==
- China (footballer, born 1982), João Pedro dos Santos Gonçalves, Portuguese footballer
- Jeitoso (born 1991), João Pedro Mussica, Mozambican footballer
- João Amaral (footballer, born 1991), João Pedro Reis Amaral, Portuguese footballer
- João Belo (footballer) (1910–1960), João Pedro Bellard Belo, Portuguese former footballer
- João Cardoso (footballer, born 1997), João Pedro Pinto Cardoso, Portuguese footballer
- João Camacho (born 1994), João Pedro Gomes Camacho, Portuguese footballer
- João Carneiro (born 1987), João Pedro Barreira Carneiro, Portuguese footballer
- João Correia (footballer, born 1996), João Pedro Araújo Correia, Portuguese footballer
- João Gonçalves (footballer) (born 1988), João Pedro do Espírito Santo Gonçalves, Portuguese former footballer
- João Graça (born 1995), João Pedro Salazar da Graça, Portuguese footballer
- João Martins (footballer, born 1982), João Pedro Pinto Martins, Angolan footballer
- João Nogueira (footballer) (born 1986), João Pedro Salgado Nogueira, Portuguese footballer
- João Paiva (born 1983), João Pedro de Lemos Paiva, Portuguese footballer
- João Pedro (footballer, born 1975), João Pedro Fernades, French-born Portuguese former footballer
- João Pedro (footballer, born 1980), João Pedro Lima Santos, Portuguese former footballer
- João Pedro (footballer, born 1984), João Pedro Henriques Neto, Portuguese former footballer
- João Pedro (footballer, born 1986), João Pedro Guerra Cunha, Portuguese footballer
- João Pedro (footballer, born May 1987), João Pedro Oliveira Araújo, Portuguese footballer
- João Pedro (footballer, born December 1987), João Pedro Azevedo Silva, Portuguese footballer
- João Pedro (footballer, born 1989), João Pedro Mendes Silva, Portuguese footballer
- João Pedro (footballer, born 1992), João Pedro Geraldino dos Santos Galvão, Italian footballer
- João Pedro (footballer, born 3 April 1993), João Pedro Almeida Machado, Portuguese footballer
- João Pedro (footballer, born 22 April 1993), João Pedro Pereira dos Santos, Brazilian footballer
- João Pedro (footballer, born April 1996), João Pedro Maciel Silva, Brazilian footballer
- João Pedro (footballer, born 13 November 1996), João Pedro Sousa Silva, Portuguese footballer
- João Pedro (footballer, born 15 November 1996), João Pedro Maturano dos Santos, Brazilian footballer
- João Pedro (footballer, born 1997) (João Pedro Heinen Silva), Brazilian footballer
- João Pedro (footballer, born June 1998), João Pedro da Silva Freitas, East Timorese footballer
- João Pedro (footballer, born 1999), João Pedro Mendes Santos, Brazilian footballer
- João Pedro (footballer, born April 2000), João Pedro Costa Contreiras Martins, Brazilian footballer
- João Pedro (footballer, born May 2000), João Pedro Boeira Duarte, Brazilian footballer
- João Pedro (footballer, born 2001), João Pedro Junqueira de Jesus, Brazilian footballer for Chelsea
- João Pedro (footballer, born 2002), João Pedro de Moura Siembarski, Brazilian footballer
- João Pedro (footballer, born February 2003), João Pedro da Cruz Oliveira, Brazilian footballer
- João Pedro (footballer, born December 2003), João Pedro de Sousa Rodrigues, Brazilian footballer
- João Pedro (footballer, born 2004), João Pedro de Sá Mendonça, Brazilian footballer
- João Pedro (footballer, born 2005), João Pedro Murilo de Paula Morais, Brazilian footballer
- João Pedro (footballer, born 2008), João Pedro Lúcio da Silva, Brazilian footballer
- João Pedro Sousa (born 1971), Portuguese former footballer and current manager of Portuguese club Famalicão
- João Silva (footballer, born 1990), João Pedro Pereira Silva, Portuguese footballer
- João Ventura (born 1994), João Pedro Ventura Medeiros, Portuguese footballer
- Jota (footballer, born March 1999), João Pedro Neves Filipe, Portuguese footballer
- Pedrinho (footballer, born 1993), João Pedro Oliveira Santos, Brazilian footballer
- Pedro Mingote (born 1980), João Pedro Mingote Ribeiro, Portuguese former footballer
- Pepê (footballer, born 1998), João Pedro Vilardi Pinto, Brazilian footballer

== Other people ==
- João Pedro de Almeida Mota (1744–1817), Portuguese composer
- João Ferreira (hurdler), João Pedro Ferreira, Portuguese former athlete
- João Pedro, Portuguese bass player with Moonspell
- João Pedro de Magalhães, Portuguese microbiologist
- João Pedro Mouzinho de Albuquerque (1736–1802), Portuguese nobleman
- João Pedro Pais (born 1971), Portuguese singer
- João Pedro Pio (born 1996), Brazilian futsal player
- João Pedro Rodrigues (born 1966), Portuguese film director
- João Pedro Silva (triathlete) (born 1989), Portuguese triathlete
- João Pedro Silva (handballer) (born 1994), Brazilian handball player
- João Pedro Sorgi (born 1993), Brazilian tennis player
- João Pedro Torlades O'Neill, Portuguese former vice-consul of Belgium from Portugal

== See also ==
- John Peter (disambiguation)
- John Petre (disambiguation)
