= Church of Santa Cruz (Lagoa) =

- Church of the Holy Cross
- Igreja de Santa Cruz
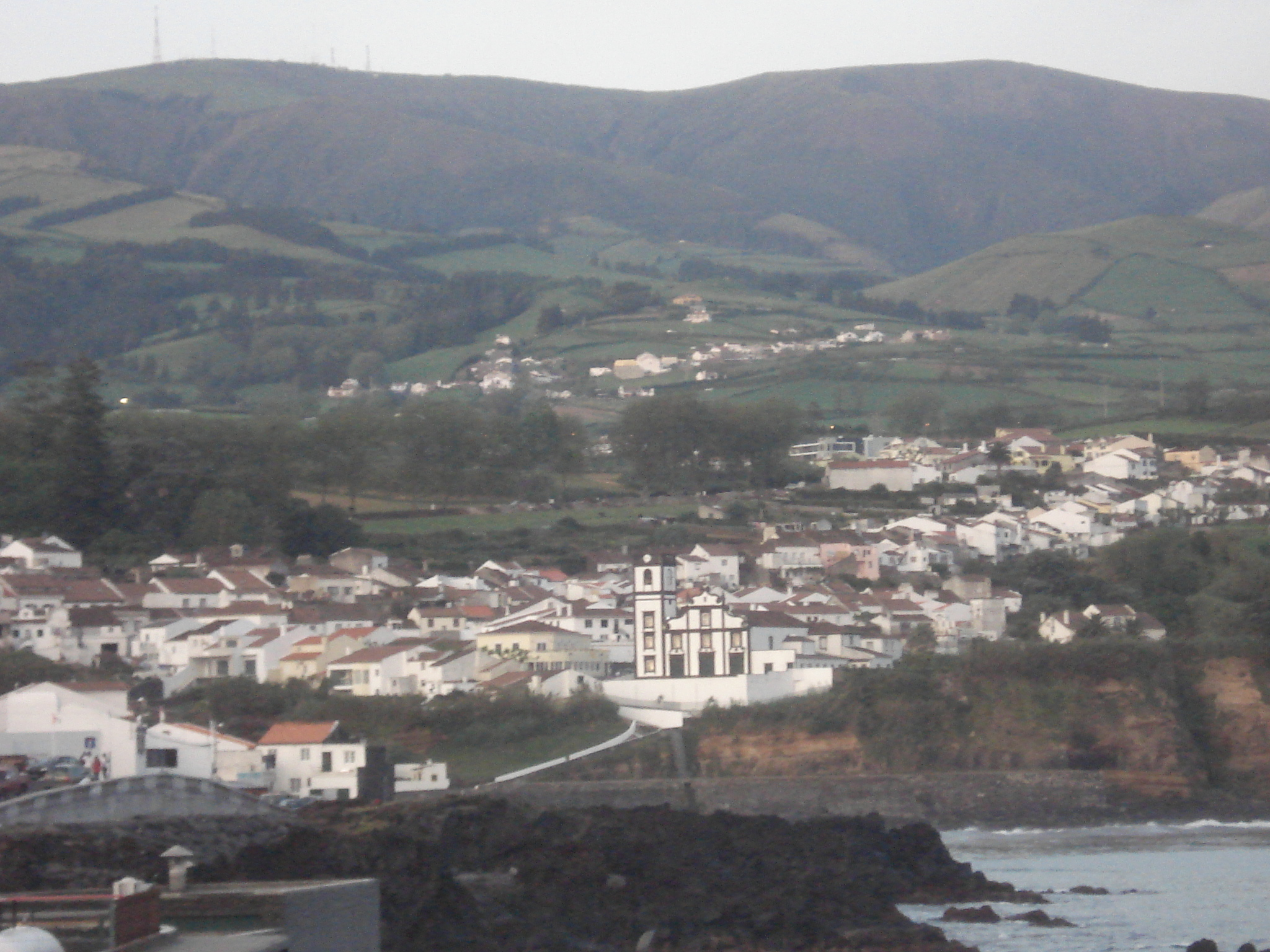
- A view of the parochial church of Santa Cruz, as seen from the coast of Lagoa

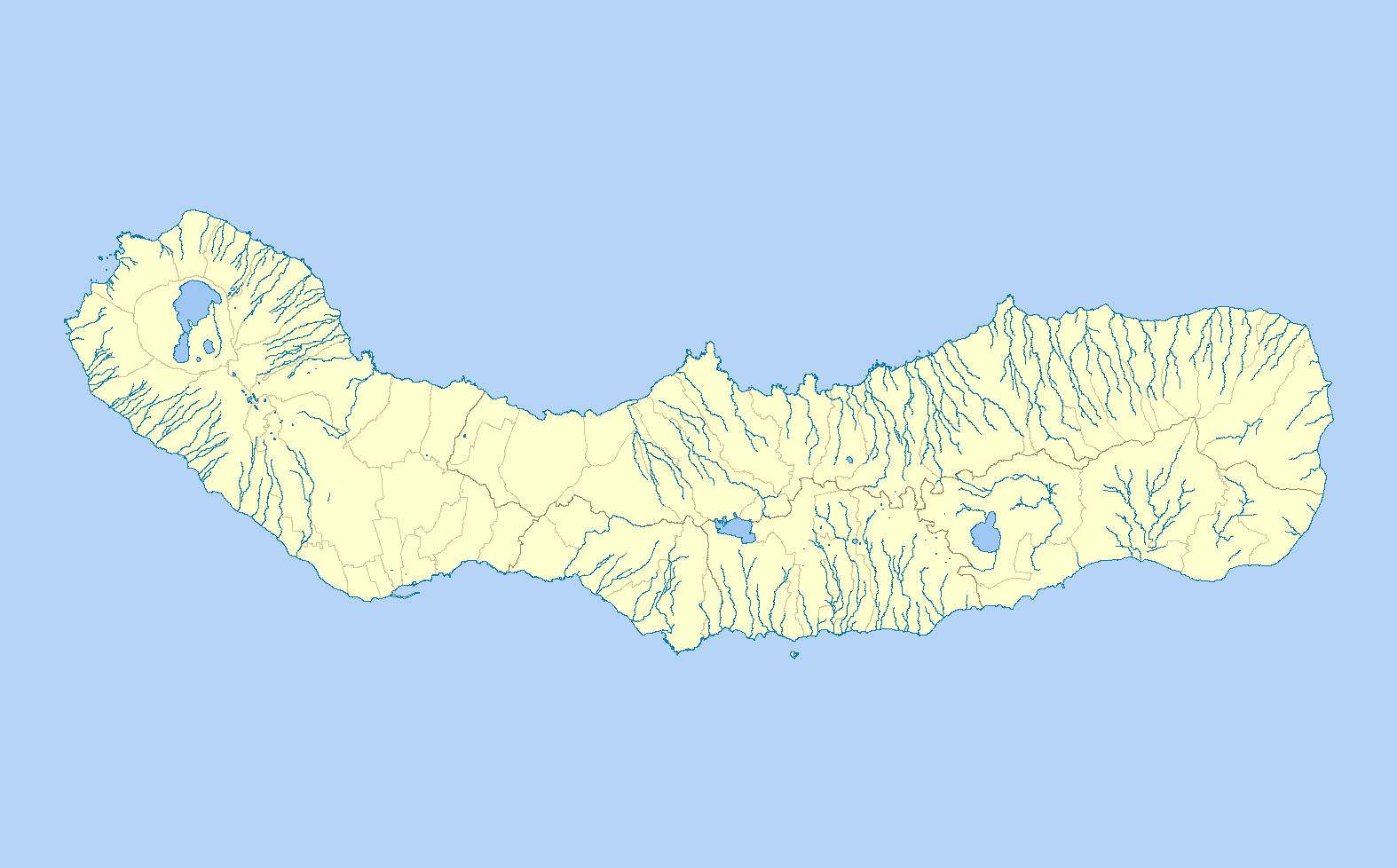
- Location of the church in the municipality of Lagoa
- 37°44′35.38″N 25°33′54.54″W
- Location: São Miguel, Eastern, Azores
- Country: Portugal
- Denomination: Roman Catholic

Architecture
- Style: Baroque

Administration
- Diocese: Diocese of Angra

The Church of Santa Cruz (Portuguese: Igreja de Santa Cruz) is a Catholic church situated in the civil parish of Santa Cruz, in the municipality of Lagoa, in the Portuguese archipelago of the Azores.

== History ==
Sometime in the 15th century, Rodrigo Afonso, who arrived in São Miguel at the beginning of the colonization, accompanying Gonçalo Vaz, instituted the a factory connected to 6.25 acres of land in Pico da Pedra, today known as the lands of Santa Cruz.

Gaspar Frutuoso, who served as interim parish priest, between 1558 and 1560, noted that the faith community had started in this territory around 1450. On 25 August 1507, the Bishop of Tangier, D. João Lobo arrived in the Azores by order of D. Diogo Pinheiro (vicar of Tomar), in order to provide religious orders and ordinate several clergy. The first parish priest, Father João de Évora arrived in 1555.

During the first years of the 16th century, the church was patronized and under the special protection of Álvaro Lopes do Vulcão and his wife D. Mecia Afonso (who were later buried near the altar of São Pedro). From these references and his testament, there were just five curia in 1543. After Mecia Afonso's death (22 October 1523) her 1518 will order the creation of a silver chalice for Our Lady of the Rosary. Frutuoso went on to mention that the church was expanded between 1583 and 1586; at about mid-century it was supported by five brotherhoods at the church: the Brotherhood of Santa Cruz, the Brotherhood of the Fiéis de Deus, the Brotherhood of Santa Maria do Rosário, the Brotherhood of Nossa Senhora da Conceição and Brotherhood of São Sebastião, each with their own initiatives (by the 19th century only two brotherhoods existed, Nossa Senhora do Rosário and Fiéis de Deus). Yet, it was the nearby hermitage of Nossa Senhora do Rosário that functioned as the parochial church of Lagoa, suggesting that Santa Cruz was under construction or remodelling. On 3 January 1692, vicar Salvador de Sousa suggested constructing a clock for the church, and during the 1844 remodelling, the frontispiece and tower were extended to make way for such a project.

The Fazenda Real (Royal Treasury) paid 112$000 in 1731 for paintings and gilding of interior woodwork. This saw the beginning of expenses on the church, and included a similar payment of 1785 for 42$000 reis, worth of improvements. Bishop D. Frei Valério do Sacramento referred to the interior chapel of Bom Jesus as the chapel of Santo Cristo, and ordered that it be redressed and decorated. Yet, on a visit by licentiate Pedro Ferreira de Medeiros, on 15 December 1746, he found a churchyard that was badly in need of repair, full of rubble, and that hindered access to the chapel. The treasury delayed investment until 1758 (42$000). On 29 October 1764, Bispo D. Frei Lourenço de Castro visited the church, and created a polemic when he indicated the administrators of the chapel of Bom Jesus did not respect their functions. He ordered the creation of a brotherhood and through donations he had the chapel repaired and redecorated.

A pulpit from the conventual church of São Francisco was transferred to Santa Cruz on 9 October 1782, but by 1794 it was already replaced by a black cedar pulpit, painted and gilded. At the end of the 17th century, the altar of the archangel Michael was crafted, which was followed in 1812 by the purchase of the image of Santo António, with splendour, crown and baby Jesus for 132$270.

In 1829, captain José Afonso de Medeiros donated the image of Senhor dos Passos in 1829 (from an inscription on the image), which was made in Porto.

Religious services at Santa Cruz became the prerogative of the vicar as of 17 May 1832, and on 21 December 1836, there was a decree to transfer the possessions of the Church to the Junta de Paróquia (ecclesiastical parish authority). A year later (on 18 September) the Junta gave the municipal administration the bill for repairs to the church and construction of the baptistery. Construction and remodelling of the frontispiece and tower was undertaken in 1844, while the altar of Bom Jesus was redone, and substituted by that of São José. A decade later, the wife of majorat Ildefonso Clímaco Raposo Bicudo Correia donated 200$000 to construct a stand for Senhor dos Passos, but a majority was actually deposited in the coffers of the Junta de Paróquia (20 August 1854), and the moneys were only dispensed on 17 June 1855.

In 1873, an image of image of Nossa Senhora do Rosário (worth 280$478) arrived from Paris: António Jacinto Botelho Âmbar offered a red tunic for the image on 12 March 1876.

In 1885 the Irmandade do Sagrado Coração de Jesus (Brotherhood of the Sacred Heart of Jesus) was established. This eventually resulted in the procurement of an image of the Sacred Heart of Jesus, by sculptor Celestino José de Queirós, which arrive in 1892. The church also acquired a new organ, executed in Ponta Delgada by Manuel de Sousa in 1894, under the direction of Father Serrão (for 850$000). The constant improvements over the years resulted in the 27 November 1895, elevation of the church to the status of Royal Chapel, even as no monarchs or high nobility buried within its walls. But, still, sometime during the 19th century, the altar of Nossa Senhora da Conceição was substituted for that of Nossa Senhora de Lurdes, donated by Father João José Tavares.

Before the installation of the Republic, in 1901, the Junta de Paróquia continued to purchase and adorn the interior, buying a silver processional cross, owing to the theft of the original, and a silver kettle that cost 230$440. Finally, on 24 October 1909, a clock arrived for the tower, made in France (at a cost of 487$180), thus fulfilling one of the longstanding requests. In 1910, with the establishment of the first Portuguese Republic, the church lost the title Royal Chapel. Former emigres to America offered a red tunic in valuer in 1917 for the image of Senhor dos Passos.

In 2007, the church commemorated 500 years of Christianism in Santa Cruz, which was marked by Portuguese pavement on the churchyard landing.
