= João Leite =

João Leite may refer to:

- João Leite River, river in Goiás, Brazil
- João Leite de Bettencourt (1916-1873), Brazilian chemist and politician
- João Leite (footballer) (born 1955), Brazilian politician and former footballer
