= Lagoa Municipality =

Lagoa Municipality may refer to:

- Lagoa Municipality (Algarve)
- Lagoa Municipality (Azores)
