= Santa Cruz Church =

Santa Cruz Church or Church of Santa Cruz may refer to:

- Church of Santa Cruz (Lagoa), a municipality of Lagoa, the Azores
- Church of Santa Cruz (Santa Cruz, Chile), a church in Santa Cruz, Chile
- Santa Cruz Church (Laguna) or Immaculate Conception Parish Church, a Catholic church in Santa Cruz, Laguna, Philippines
- Santa Cruz Church (Manila), a Catholic church in Santa Cruz, Manila, Philippines
- Monastery of Santa Cruz (Coimbra), a monastery church in Coimbra, Portugal
- Santa Cruz Church (Bangkok), a Catholic church in Bangkok, Thailand
- Church of Santa Cruz de Cangas de Onís, a church in northern Spain
