= João Leite de Bettencourt =

- Born: João Leite de Bettencourt; August 21, 1916; Nossa Senhora do Rosário
- Died: March 12, 1973 (aged 56); Nossa Senhora do Rosário
- Occupations: Chemist, Politician
- Known for: Economic and social development of Lagoa and industrialist

João Leite de Bettencourt (21 August 1916, Nossa Senhora do Rosário - 12 March 1973, Nossa Senhora do Rosário) was a chemist, industrialist and politician from the island of São Miguel in the Portuguese archipelago of the Azores, important for his role in local government and modernization/expansion of the Fábrica de Cerâmica Lima.

== Biography ==
João Leite was born to João Moniz Pacheco de Bettencourt and his wife Maria dos Anjos Adão Leite in 1916, in the civil parish of Nossa Senhora do Rosário, municipality of Lagoa.

In 1942 he received his diploma in chemical analysis from the Instituto Industrial de Lisboa (which later became the Institute Superior de Engenharia de Lisboa.

=== Career ===
Following his time on the continent he returned to São Miguel to begin his professional career, working from the Fabrica de Lactincínios Loreto.

He married on 10 December 1945, in the Church of Nossa Senhora do Rosário, to Berta da Luz Botelho e Silva, daughter of José Silva and Maria Botelho. He had four children: João Manuel, José Eduardo, Maria Palmira and Rui Jorge. José Silva, his father-in-law, was an important public figure in Lagoa at the time, and was likely an important influence on João Leite's interest in local politics and administration. In fact, for a good part of his life, José Silva was president of the local municipal council.

In 1951, he joined the União das Fábricas Açorianos de Álcool, as part of the Fábrica do Álcool de Lagoa, when he began to work as their chief scientist and chemist. Around the same time, he began to become involved in local politics, joining the municipal council of Lagoa as their vice-president, during the mandate of Eng. Jaime Sousa Lima. Sometime during this period he had time to travel to Barcelona, to begin a short internship in the area of fermentation, in order to improve his chemical background. He continued his European experience in 1958, with a trip to Belgium, in order to participate in the Brussels Exposition (the first exposition following the Second World War).

Following his return, in 1959 he nominated to preside as president of the municipal council of Lagoa, initiating projects to develop the economy and social development of the municipality. But, his tenure was short-lived, and within a year, he abdicated his position to his cousin, Eng. João da Mota Amaral. He continued to participate as vice-president for the next three terms, before leaving politics in 1972.

=== Later life ===
Meanwhile, in January 1964, he became the main property-owner the Fabrica de Cerâmica Lima (Lima Ceramics Factory), in order to perpetuate the memory and heritage of his maternal-grandfather, Manuel Leite Pereira, who was responsible founding the operation, renaming the venerable industry Cerâmica Lima. His administration saw the expansion of the business, with 400 types of ceramics in various colours (in addition to the traditional white-and-blue), which they sold in their shops in Alminhas (Lagoa) and Rua dos Mercadores.

Owing to illness, Bettencourt would sell his stake on 9 March 1973, on the eve of his death: he died on 12 March 1973.
