= Gaspar Frutuoso =

Portuguese priest, historian and humanist

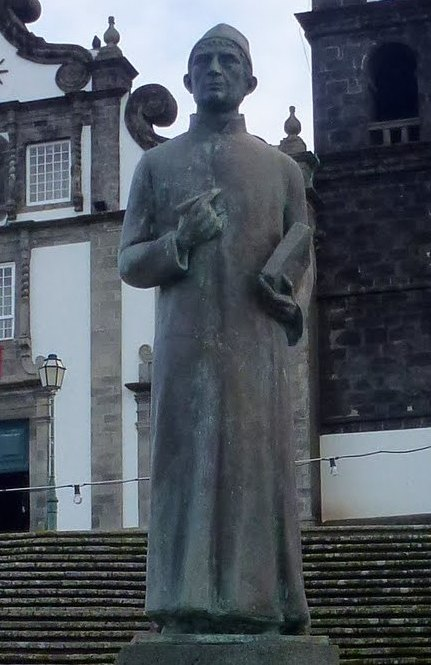
- Born: c. 1522; Ponta Delgada (Azores), Kingdom of Portugal
- Died: 24 August 1591 (aged 68–69); Ribeira Grande (Azores), Kingdom of Portugal
- Education: University of Coimbra
- Occupation: Priest
- Relatives: Frutuoso Dias (father); Isabel Fernandes (mother)
- Writing career
- Language: Portuguese
- Period: 1696–1717
- Genres: History, Geography, Ethnography
- Subjects: Azores, Theology, Philosophy
- Notable works: Saudades da Terra ''Saudades do Céu

Gaspar Frutuoso (c. 1522 – 1591) was a Portuguese priest, historian and humanist from the island of São Miguel, in the Portuguese archipelago of the Azores. His major contribution to Portuguese history was his detailed descriptions of the history and geography of the Azores, Madeira, Canary Islands and references to Cape Verde, which he published in his six-part tome Saudades da Terra, as well as Saudades do Céu.

== Biography ==
Gaspar Frutuoso was born in 1522, on the island of São Miguel, son of Frutuoso Dias, a merchant and rural property-owner, and his wife Isabel Fernandes. Little is known of his childhood, apart from references to him working his father's lands during this period.

The first trustworthy record about Frutuoso was his admission to the University of Salamanca (in 1548) where he later obtained an Arts certification. At the age of 31 (in 1554), he was ordained during a visit to São Miguel; his records from 1554 to 1555 show him registered as presbitero bachiller. He continued his studies in Salamanca under the noted theologian Domingo de Soto, the royal confessor of King Charles V, Holy Roman Emperor (and Charles I of Spain) and envoy to the Council of Trent, where he obtained a theology baccalaureate. During his time in Salamanca he became friends with Father Miguel Torres, a member of the Society of Jesus, which would later serve him as he was promoting charitable activities in the Azores.

He briefly returned to the Azores between 1558 and 1560, where he became parish priest in Santa Cruz, in the municipality of Lagoa (records written by him during this period date his time in the parish).

In 1560, he decided to return to Salamanca in order to complete a Doctorate in Theology, but began working with Bishop Julião de Alva in Bragança, where he remained until 1563. It is unclear when, and from where, he attained his Doctorate, but he began to use this title from 1565, also when his name began appearing on the University of Évora's registry (an institution of the Society of Jesus), after 1569.

By decree on 20 May 1565, he was nominated to be the vicar and orator at the parochial Church of Nossa Senhora da Estrela (Our Lady of the Star), in the municipality of Ribeira Grande, a position he held for the next 26 years (until his death). During this time, he was dedicated to the parish, as well as charitable works he contributed towards on and off-island, but still had time writing his 16 manuscripts that included Saudades da Terra, and Saudades do Ceu.

Ever mindful of the politics of the time, during the period of the Philippine Dynasty, he was:

"...generally benevolent, and at the same time cautious and prudent...always respecting the established order, he always spoke of Philip II with reverence owed to his royal majesty and mindful of his right to the throne, never letting himself fall into diatribes or acerbic references nor acrimony against contrary factions."

In 1566, during the French assault on Funchal, he collected funds and wheat for the people of Madeira.

He died on 24 August 1591 and was buried in the Church of Nossa Senhora da Estrela, in Ribeira Grande.

== Saudades da Terra ==
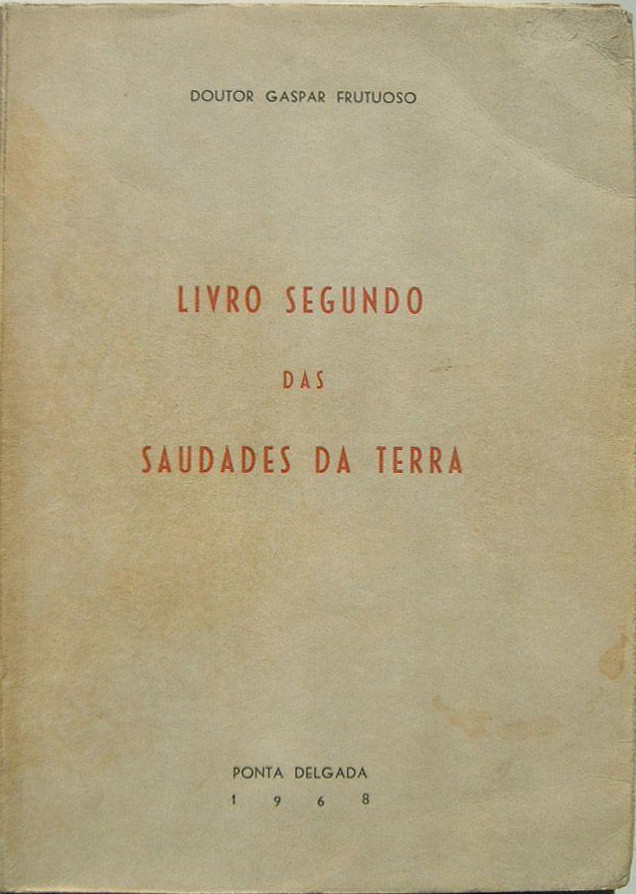
Second volume of Frutuoso's Saudades da Terra, dedicated to Madeira

Saudades da Terra, literally Nostalgic-longing for the Land, is a six-volume tome that contains observations by the author, of the history and geography of the Atlantic territories of the Kingdom of Portugal, as well as the Canary Islands (lands at one time attributed to Portugal). It is a referential work for the understanding of the islands of Macaronesia at the end of the 16th Century. The work is not limited to geography and history, but also covers daily life, customs and traditions, genealogy, the origins of place names, flora and fauna, and affirms Frutuoso's humanist nature, typical of the Renaissance.

His detailed descriptions are so detailed that they were published into separate volumes which cover:

- Book I – Cape Verde and Canary Islands;
- Book II – Madeira;
- Book III – Santa Maria (Azores);
- Book IV – São Miguel (Azores);
- Book V – Poem
- Book VI – Terceira, Faial, Pico, Flores, Graciosa, São Jorge (Azores).

The fifth volume is an elaborate poem, from the perspective of a fictional character, writing in a pastoral style, about the history of two friends that are separated and forced to live far from home. Some biographers have cited this as a deliberate autobiography of Frutuoso and his university friend, the Micalense medic, Gaspar Gonçalves.

Gaspar Frutuoso apparently attempted to publish his work, going so far as to rework and edit his manuscript (the original has many edits in his hand). For reasons that are never clear, although the Spanish occupation of the island (during the Iberian Union) may have influenced his decision, he never published the work. The manuscript, along with documents from his library, were sent to the Jesuit College in Ponta Delgada and preserved until 1760 (when the Society of Jesus was expelled from Portugal). The manuscript fell into the hands of people who restricted access to the document, until it was donated to the General Committee of Ponta Delgada, and incorporated into the holdings of the Public Library and Archive (where it now resides). The work was finally published in 1873, with thirty notes by Álvaro Rodrigues de Azevedo, and a prologue by the Dicionário Universal de Português Ilustrado (Illustrated Universal Dictionary of Portugal), written by Fernandes Costa. Many partial editions of Saudades da Terra have been re-published by the Instituto Cultural de Ponta Delgada since 1966.
