= Nossa Senhora do Rosário =

- Civil parish
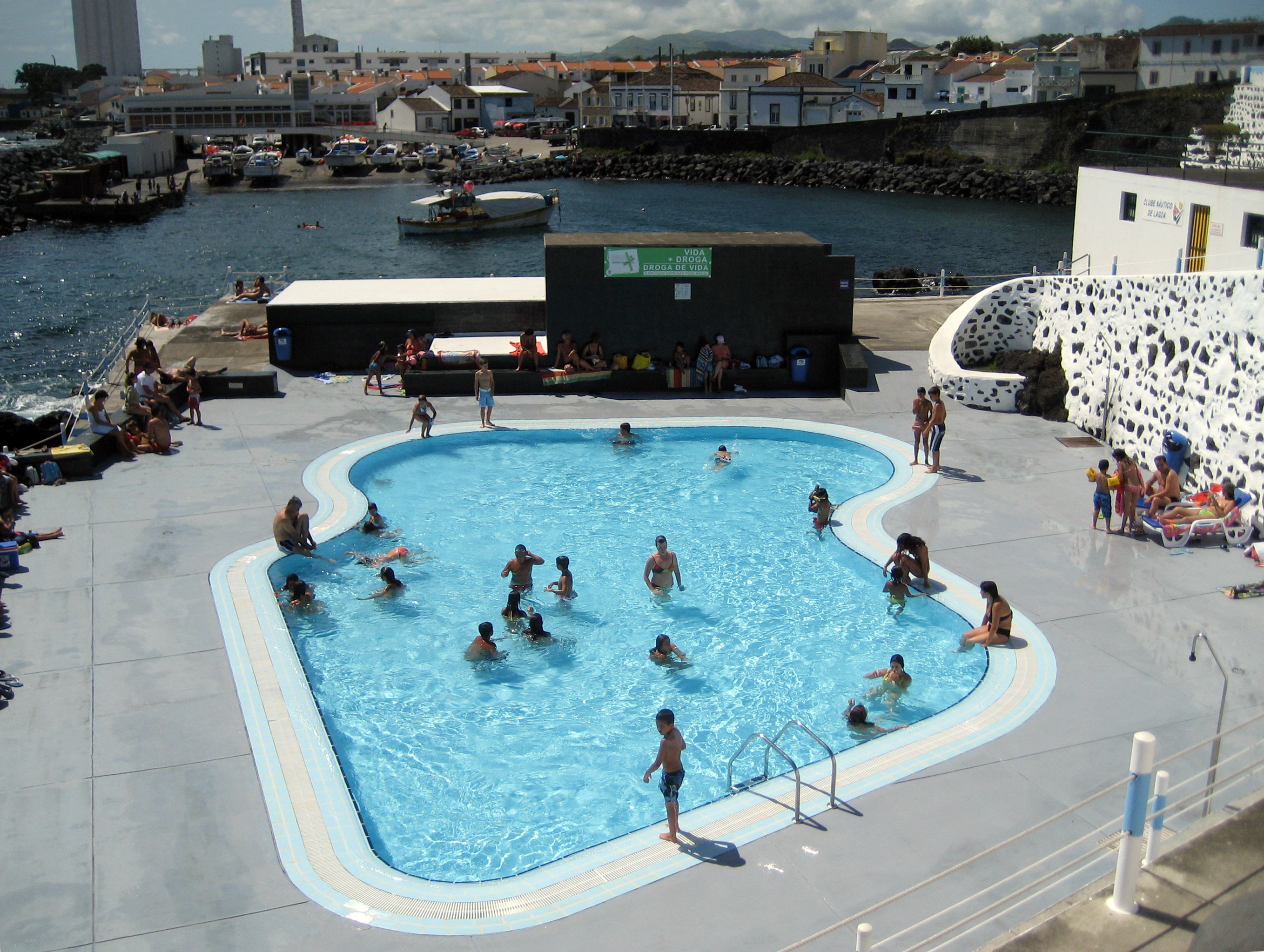
- Municipal swimming pools, showing the Porto dos Carneiros and urbanized core of the civil parish of Nossa Senhora dos Rosário

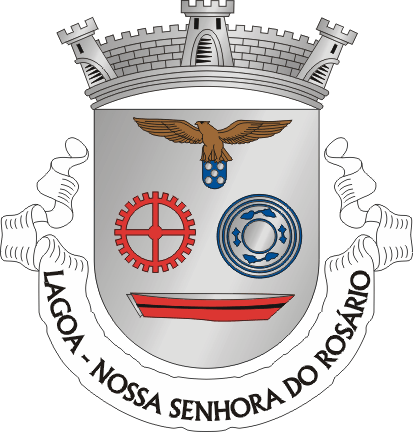
- Coat of arms

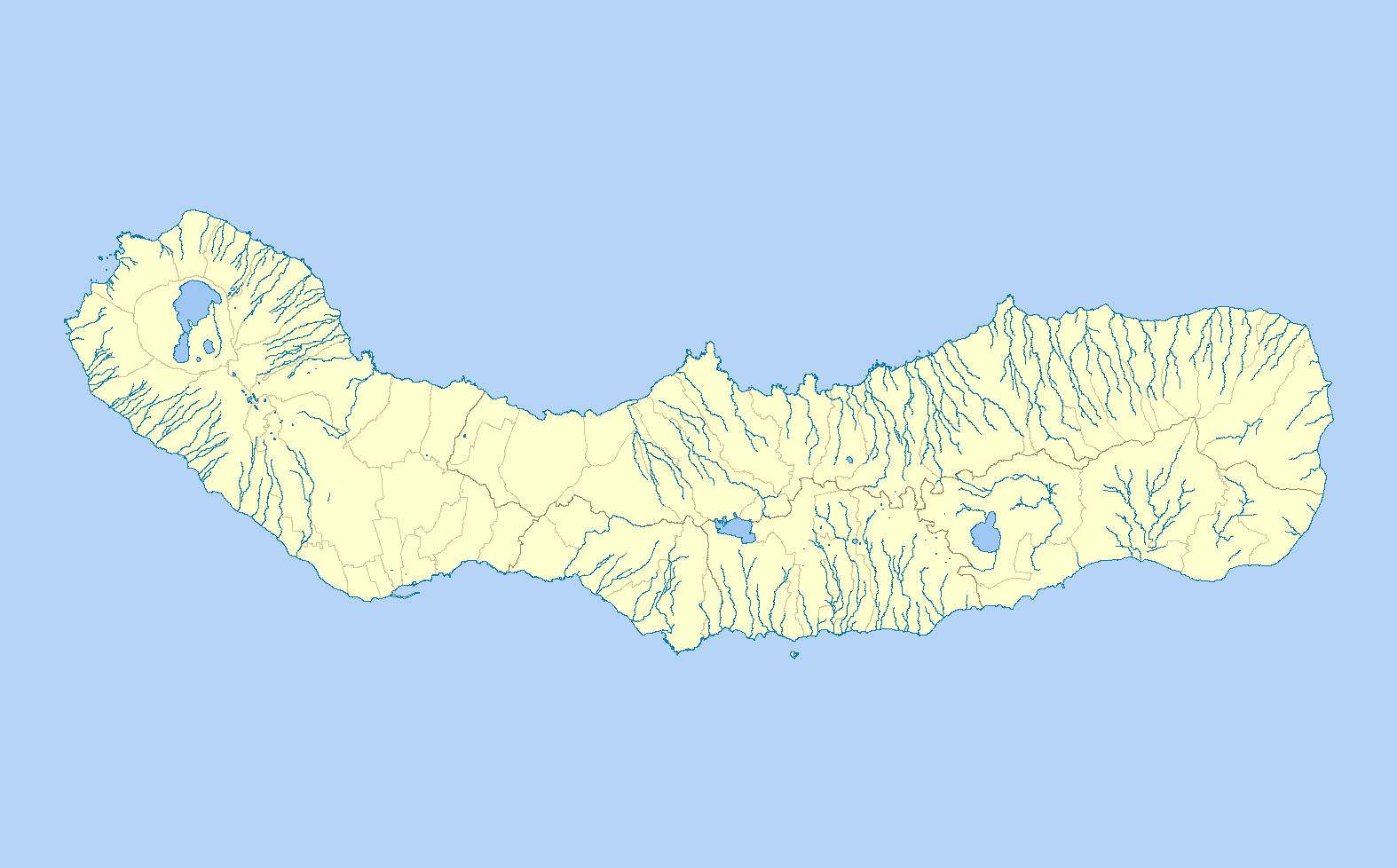
- Location in the Azores Nossa Senhora do Rosário (São Miguel)
- Coordinates: 37°45′0″N 25°34′35″W
- Country: Portugal
- Auton. region: Azores
- Island: São Miguel
- Municipality: Lagoa
- Established: Settlement: c. 1444; Parish: 22 April 1522

Area
  - Total: 6.52 km^{2} (2.52 sq mi)
- Elevation: 49 m (161 ft)

Population (2011)
  - Total: 5,396
  - Density: 828/km^{2} (2,140/sq mi)
- Time zone: UTC−01:00 (AZOT)
  - Summer (DST): UTC+00:00 (AZOST)
- Postal code: 9560-097
- Area code: 292
- Patron: Nossa Senhora do Rosário
- Website: http://www.juntarosario.org/

Nossa Senhora do Rosário is a civil parish and most populated area in the municipality of Lagoa, on the island of São Miguel, in the Portuguese archipelago of the Azores. With a population of 5396 inhabitants in 2011, the parish covers an area of approximately 6.52 square kilometres (2.52 mi^{2}) that extends from the southern coast of the island. It contains the localities Atalhada, Bairro das Socas, Nossa Senhora do Rosário, Porto dos Carneiros and Vila Mar.

== History ==
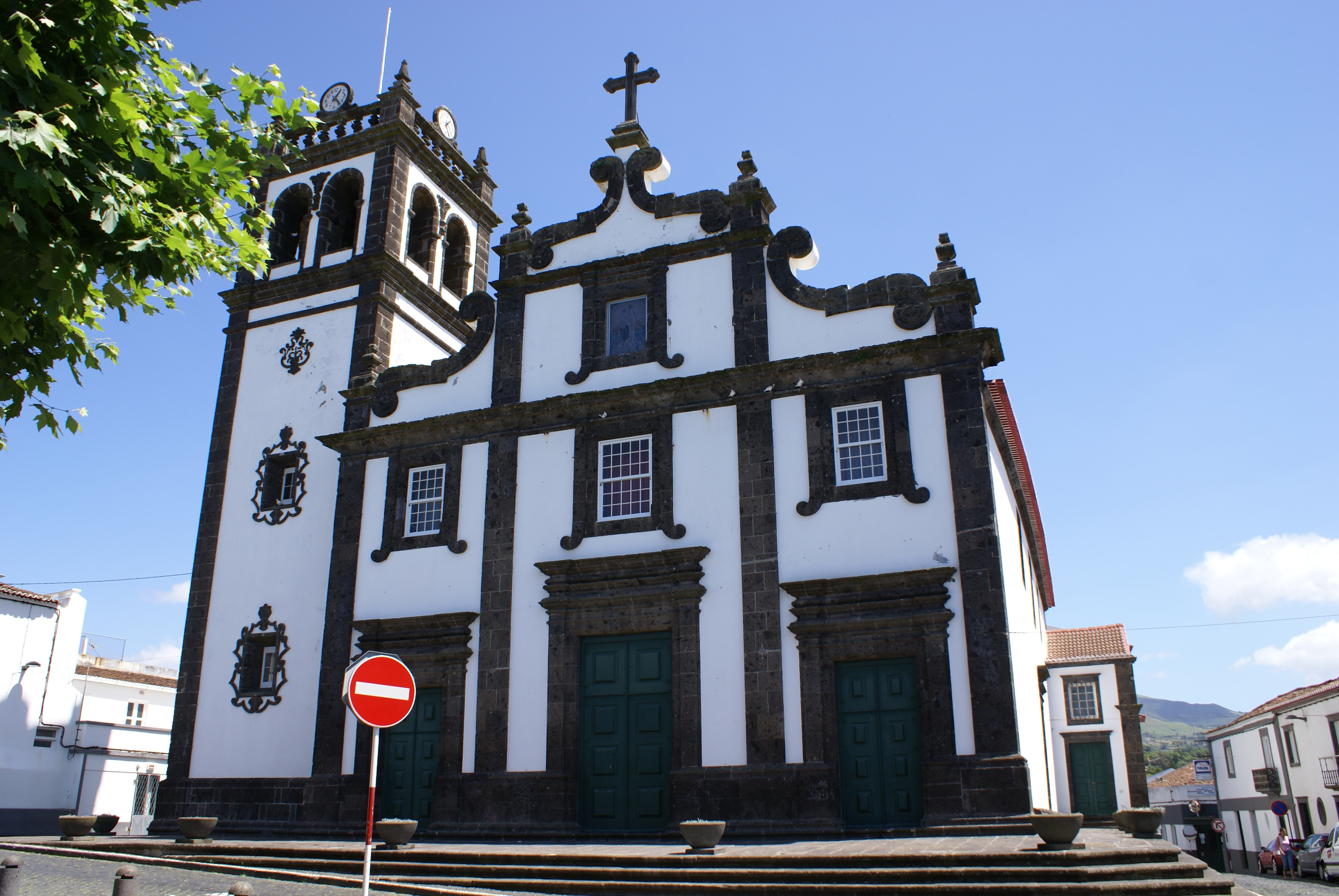
Front facade of the parochial church of Nossa Senhora do Rosário in the centre of the city of Lagoa

Rosário was originally part of the neighboring parish of Santa Cruz, but quickly its population and socio-political importance grew, requiring an administrative solution. Local historians suggest that may have been one of the first villas to be settled on the island of São Miguel, although there is little record to support this assertion. The settlement was elevated to the status of vila on 22 April 1522, under the religious parish of Santa Cruz; half a decade later, the continued growth of the settlement necessitated the establishment of a secondary faith community concentrated on the parochial church of Nossa Senhora do Rosário, thus justifying its creation on 5 April 1595.

In his public work Memorial da Lagoa e do seu Concelho ("Memory of Lagoa and its Municipality"), Carreiro da Costa wrote:

"There is a decree that is known by the studious, and it is a valuable document about the beginning of settlement in our islands. It is a decree during the age of minority of that monarch (Afonso V), dated 2 od July 1439, where the Infante D. Henrique is authorized to send to the first seven islands of the Azores, at the time discovered, the first families, when years before there were scattered some head of cattle." It was this note, that the coastal areas of São Miguel that justified the assertion that the area in which the present villa is located pertained to the first settlers in the Azores. These first settlers encountered prodigious herds of sheep and goats, and in particular rams when they arrived in the bay of Lagoa. Consequently, the cove was named Porto dos Carneiros ("carneiros" meaning "rams" in Portuguese).

In the middle of the 15th Century, there existed in this settlement four religious temples, one of which was the Church of Nossa Senhora do Rosário. This church was expanded progressively, as the community grew, and between 1583-1586, it began to serve as the villas central church, while the Church of Santa Cruz was being remodeled. Nossa Senhora do Rosário was constructed over an older chapel of the same name that had existed since the 16th Century. The 17th Century church, in larger dimensions, has three naves and notable group of sculptures by the artist Machado de Castro.

The municipal council of Lagoa promoted a ceremony to honour the diverse personalities from the parish to mark the 417 anniversary of the elevation of the community to civil parish status.

== Geography ==
The parish is situated along the southern maritime coast, between Santa Cruz and Ponta Delgada, and extends along coast and into the interior. Two main vias intersect the parish and divide the parish into quarters, along north-south and west-east segments of the regional E.R.1-1ª roadway. To the south is the older arm of the coastal road that connects the city to Ponta Delgada and Vila Franca do Campo.

The border follows the Grota do Porto ravine, north to the border with Cabouco (along Rua das Arrudas), then west to the beginning of Caminho do Malaca, following this road to Malacca de Cima. Crossing the Via-Rápida (North-South), the frontier follows the Estrada dos Portões Vermelhos until the E.R.7 roadway, when it descends along Canada das Socas, then Canada Santa to the Barrio of Socas and the west-east segment of the Via-Rápida. From this freeway the border follows the Canada Nova do Pópulo, then Rua Padre Domingos da Silva Costa, before bisecting towards the coast through the property of Prolacto-Nestlé factory.

To the west, alongside the Via-Rapida, is the industrial zone of the city of Lagoa, to the north the main modern residential community, while to the interior are landscapes of walled agricultural lands and forest woodlots.

== Economy ==
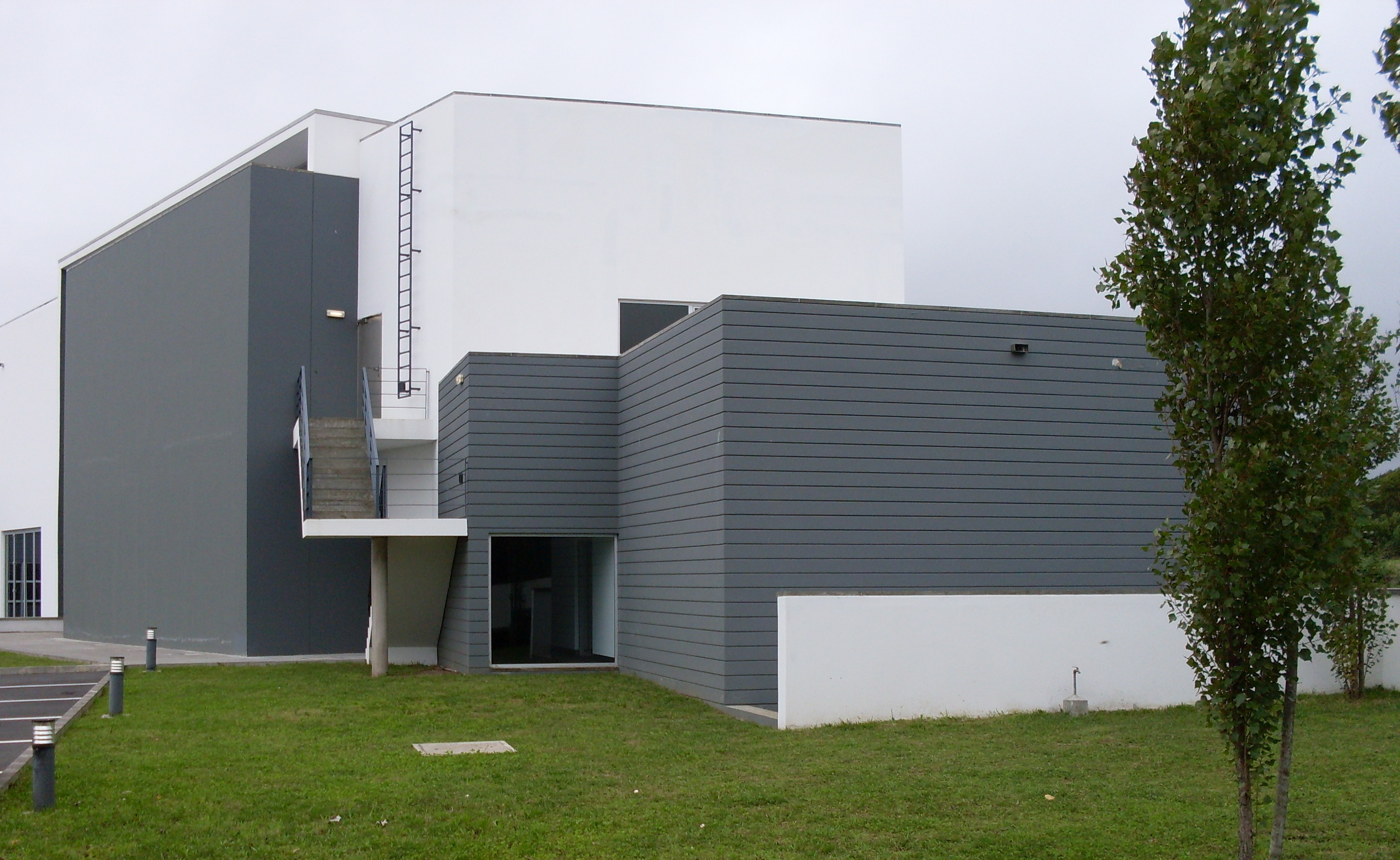
Expolab, one the main businesses in the Parque Tecnologico da Lagoa

Rosário is an industrial center in the region, the location of several large and artisanal businesses that produce oils, animal feed, soap, services that include carpentry, metallurgy, saw mills, as well as the sale of alcohol, ceramics, paints.

Further, the agricultural production of milk and milk products (specifically cheese and butter), commercial fishery and hotel service sectors are also important in the area.

There are two industrial zones: at the intersection of Via-Rapida off-ramps it the Technological Park of Lagoa (Portuguese: Parque Tecnologico da Lagoa) and to the north, the Industrial Park of Portões Vermelhos (Parque Industrial dos Portões Vermelhos).

== Architecture ==
=== Civic ===
- Fishermens' Barrio Residences (Portuguese: Bairro de Casas para Pescadores de Lagoa)
- Manorhouse of Atalhada (Portuguese: Solar da Atalhada)
- Manorhouse of Rocha Quebrada (Portuguese: Solar da Rocha Quebrada/Palácio da Rocha Quebrada
- Palace of Fischer (Portuguese: Palácio do Fischer)
- Residence/Chapel of Nossa Senhora do Pópulo (Portuguese: Casa e Ermida de Nossa Senhora do Pópulo)

=== Religious ===
- Church of Nossa Senhora do Rosário (Portuguese: Igreja Paroquial do Rosário/Igreja de Nossa Senhora do Rosário)
- Hermitage of Nossa Senhora da Estrela (Portuguese: Ermida de Nossa Senhora da Estrela)
- Hermitage of Nossa Senhora das Necessidades (Portuguese: Ermida de Nossa Senhora das Necessidades/Igreja Paroquial de Atalhada)
- Lagoa's Way of the Cross (Portuguese: Passos da Via Sacra da Lagoa)
