= Cabouco =

- Civil parish
- The location of the civil parish of Cabouco in the municipality of Lagoa
- Coordinates: 37°45′52″N 25°33′56″W
- Country: Portugal
- Auton. region: Azores
- Island: São Miguel
- Municipality: Lagoa
- Established: Civil parish: 20 September 1980

Area
  - Total: 4.85 km^{2} (1.87 sq mi)
- Elevation: 169 m (554 ft)

Population (2011)
  - Total: 1,921
  - Density: 400/km^{2} (1,000/sq mi)
- Time zone: UTC−01:00 (AZOT)
  - Summer (DST): UTC+00:00 (AZOST)
- Postal code: 9560-311
- Area code: 292
- Patron: Nossa Senhora da Misericórdia
- Website: lagoa-acores.pt

Cabouco is a civil parish in the municipality of Lagoa on the island of São Miguel in the Portuguese Azores. The population in 2011 was 1,921, in an area of 4.85 km².

== History ==
One of the first references to this area of São Miguel occurred in the 16th century when Captain Manuel Rodrigues Canejo and his wife, Maria de Paiva, constructed a local hermitage to support religious services.

On 22 June 1670, a concession to build a church was granted by Bishop friar Clemente Vieira, during a period when the Cabouco included less than 30 homes.

The construction of the new temple would only begin in 1846, under the direction of Father Cosme de Sousa.

At the time of its elevation to the status of civil parish Cabouco had approximately 1250 inhabitants (with some estimates of about 2900 annually). The growth of this centre was due to its connection and accessibility to the municipality of Lagoa, cheap parcels and creation of the industrial zone, that funnelled most commercial and manufacturing activities to the centre of the island.
