= John Petre =

John Petre may refer to:

- John Petre (died 1571), MP for Dartmouth (UK Parliament constituency)
- John Petre (died 1581), MP for Exeter (UK Parliament constituency)
- John Petre, 1st Baron Petre (1549–1613)
- John Petre, 5th Baron Petre (1629–1684)
- John Petre, 18th Baron Petre (born 1942)

== See also ==
- John Peter (disambiguation)
