= João Ventura =

Portuguese footballer

Personal information
- Full name: João Pedro Ventura Medeiros
- Date of birth: 14 January 1994 (age 32)
- Place of birth: Lagoa, Portugal
- Height: 1.72 m (5 ft 8 in)
- Position: Forward

Team information
- Current team: Real
- Number: 17

Youth career
- 2003–2012: Operário
- 2012–2013: Santa Clara

Senior career*
Years	Team	Apps	(Gls)
2011–2012	Operário	21	(1)
2012–2017	Santa Clara	52	(5)
2015–2016	→ Operário (loan)	31	(9)
2016–2017	→ Benfica e Castelo Branco (loan)	27	(7)
2018–2019	Ideal	46	(15)
2019–	Real	8	(0)
- * Club domestic league appearances and goals as of 00:45, 29 October 2019 (UTC)

João Pedro Ventura Medeiros (born 14 January 1994), known as João Ventura, is a Portuguese footballer who plays for Real S.C. as a forward.

== Football career ==
Born in Rosário, Lagoa (Azores), Ventura started playing with local Operário, joining the club's youth system at the age of nine and making his senior debuts in 2011 in the third division. In the following year he signed for neighbouring Santa Clara, appearing in only three second level games in his debut season (38 minutes of action).
