= João Carneiro =

Portuguese footballer

Personal information
- Full name: João Pedro Barreira Carneiro
- Date of birth: 21 February 1987 (age 39)
- Place of birth: Guimarães, Portugal
- Height: 1.73 m (5 ft 8 in)
- Position: Defender

Team information
- Current team: São Martinho

Youth career
- 1996–2006: Vitória de Guimarães

Senior career*
Years	Team	Apps	(Gls)
2006–2007	Famalicão	16	(1)
2007–2010	Joane		
2010–2014	Fafe	74	(9)
2014	Académico de Viseu	8	(1)
2015	Fafe	14	(0)
2015–2016	Varzim	36	(2)
2016	Fafe	14	(1)
2017	Amarante	13	(0)
2017–2018	Vilaverdense	15	(0)
2018–	São Martinho	77	(6)
- * Club domestic league appearances and goals as of 3 September 2021

João Pedro Barreira Carneiro (born 21 February 1987) is a Portuguese football player who plays for São Martinho.

== Club career ==
He made his professional debut in the Segunda Liga for Académico de Viseu on 9 August 2014 in a game against Chaves.
