= John Peter =

John Peter may refer to:

- John Peter (critic) (1938–2020), theatre critic for the Sunday Times
- John Peter (novelist) (1921–1983), Canadian English literature scholar, essayist, and novelist
- John Peter (field hockey) (1937–1998), Indian field hockey player
- John Peter (music director), Indian film score and soundtrack composer
- John Peter, former name of Kenyan leader Jomo Kenyatta

== See also ==
- John Petre (disambiguation)
