= João Pedro de Almeida Mota =

Portuguese composer

João Pedro de Almeida Mota (24 June 1744, Lisbon, Portugal – c. 1817, Madrid, Spain) was a Portuguese composer. The musical studies of João Pedro de Almeida Mota were probably as a choirboy, either in the Sé of Lisbon or in the São Vicente de Fora church, both churches being the center of musical activity in Lisbon at the time.

In 1771 he emigrated to Galicia for unknown reasons. All of Almeida Mota’s lifetime was devoted to the service of Church and he left more than 200 works behind the archives and cathedrals in Spain and Portugal. Among his most outstanding compositions is an Oratorio entitled "Passion for soloists, choir and orchestra" which was discovered in Vila Viçosa, Portugal.
