= Lagoa, Azores =

Lagoa
- Municipality
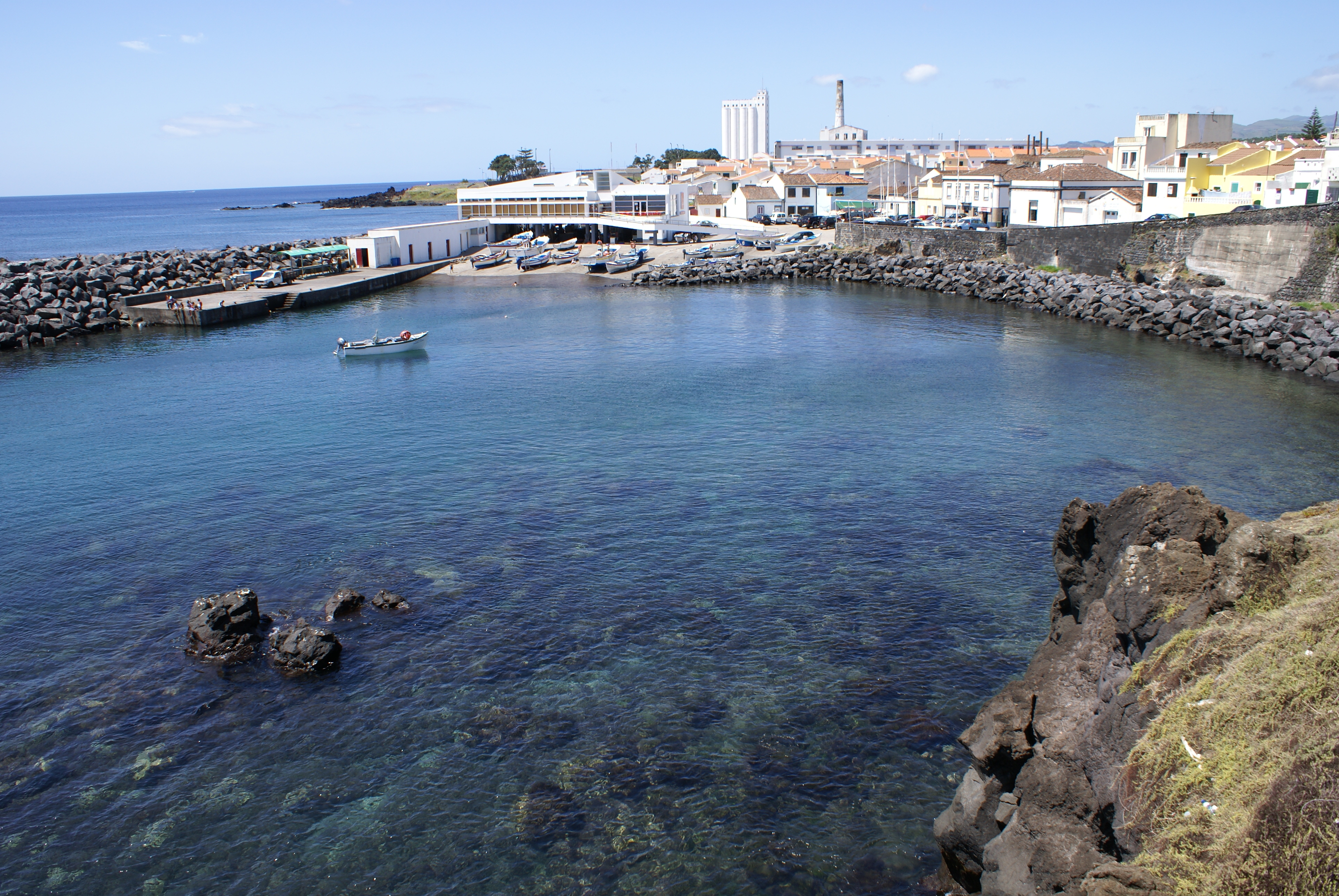
- The sheltered cove of Porto dos Carneiros

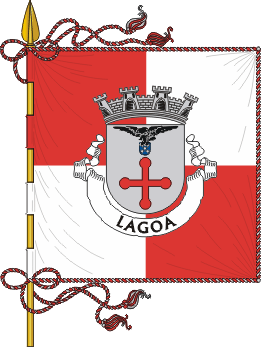
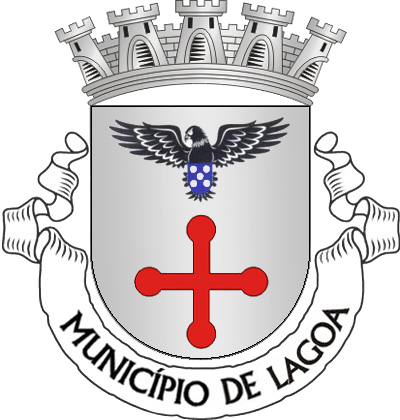
- Flag Coat of arms
- Interactive map of Lagoa
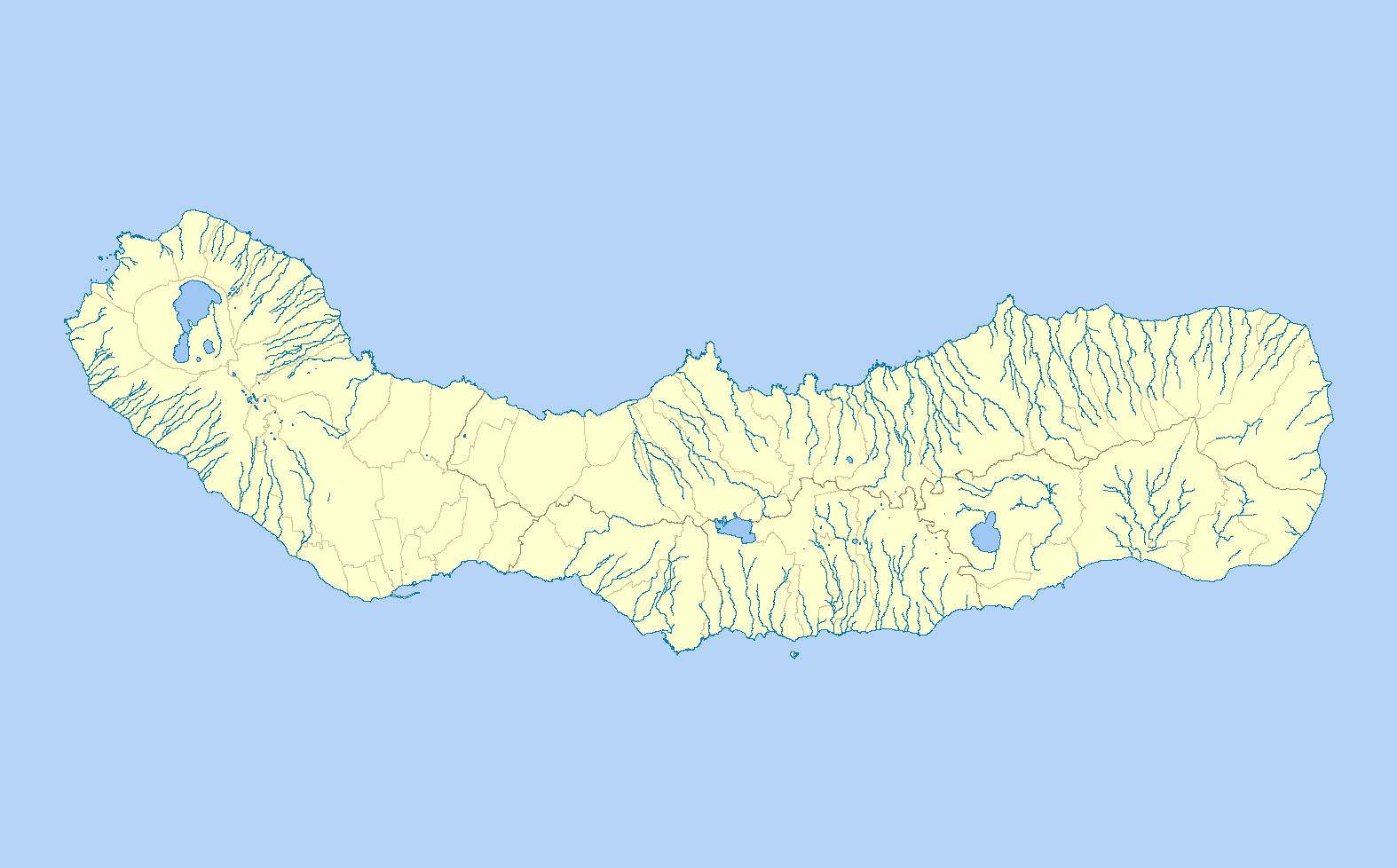
- Location in the Azores Lagoa (São Miguel)
- Coordinates: 37°44′55″N 25°32′25″W
- Country: Portugal
- Auton. region: Azores
- Island: São Miguel
- Established: Settlement: c. 1515; Municipality: 11 April 1522
- Parishes: 5

Government
  - President: Frederico Furtado de Sousa

Area
  - Total: 45.59 km^{2} (17.60 sq mi)
- Elevation: 203 m (666 ft)

Population (2011)
  - Total: 14,442
  - Density: 316.8/km^{2} (820.5/sq mi)
- Time zone: UTC−01:00 (AZOT)
  - Summer (DST): UTC+00:00 (AZOST)
- Postal code: 9560-045
- Area code: 296
- Patron: Nossa Senhora do Rosário
- Local holiday: 11 April

Lagoa (Portuguese pronunciation: [lɐˈɣoɐ]; Portuguese for lagoon) is a municipality in the southwestern part of São Miguel Island in the Azores. The population in 2011 was 14,442, in an area of 45.59 km^{2}. Lagoa is located east of Ponta Delgada, the island capital.

== History ==
The area of Lagoa was settled just after the first colonists came to the island of São Miguel, and its first inhabitants established their homes in the areas that would eventually form the villages of Lagoa and Água de Pau. It is believed that early settlers chose the area for its sheltered bay, which was necessary for their loading and unloading of cargo, livestock and provisions. The Porto dos Carneiros was one of these areas, so named for the fact that sheep, as well as other animals, were offloaded within its cove. The celebrated Portuguese historian, Father Gaspar Frutuoso referred to Lagoa, in the way that the first settlers named it, a name that was dependent on where they made their homes:

“The village of Lagoa, called this owing to the existence of a "lake in front" of the doors to the Church (a reef) and its port where [it was large enough for ships] to battle, where in the past there were large catches of fish, since the ocean would enter it, and the livestock would drink from its waters and others would pass time swimming in its waters..."

It was in the area of the Church of Santa Cruz that most of these original founders established their homes, near an ancient lake (long since dried up). In the 15th century, the island of São Miguel continued to receive settlers and in Lagoa those colonists steadily settled farther to the west, around the bay that became known as Porto dos Carneiros, where fishing began to take on an important aspect of the local economy. To the east of the village of Lagoa, several families established agrarian settlements in the vicinity of Água de Pau.

Around 1515, due to its social and economic growth the village of Água de Pau was elevated to Villa and made temporary municipal seat of the newly incorporated municipality of Lagoa. By this time, the historian Father Gaspar Frutuoso noted in his tome Saudades da Terra the 100 homes existed in the community; a comparable size to the other centers on the island, but only half the size of Ponta Delgada (250), Vila Franca do Campo (200) or Ribeira Grande (200). In 1522 (April 11) Lagoa, the village, became the municipal seat of the municipality, at a time when the population hovered around 1000 people and 300 homes. At the time, it was considered one of the more productive agricultural areas of the island, responsible for wheat, wine and woad production. Its port was the important regional point of entry and exit for many of its products, in addition to fishing center.

The communities prosperity extended into the 19th century, when the village was the center of a flourishing ceramic industry and distillation of alcohol and spirits. By the 20th century these industries were supplemented by factories for the production of vegetable oil, soap and animal feeds, at a time when agricultural production and the fishery was also dominant. At the end of the 20th century, the tertiary sector had taken on a significant part of the areas economy (58.2% of the population was active in these activities), while the number of new companies involved in the sector grew (17.2%, between 2001 and 2004).

== Geography ==
=== Physical geography ===
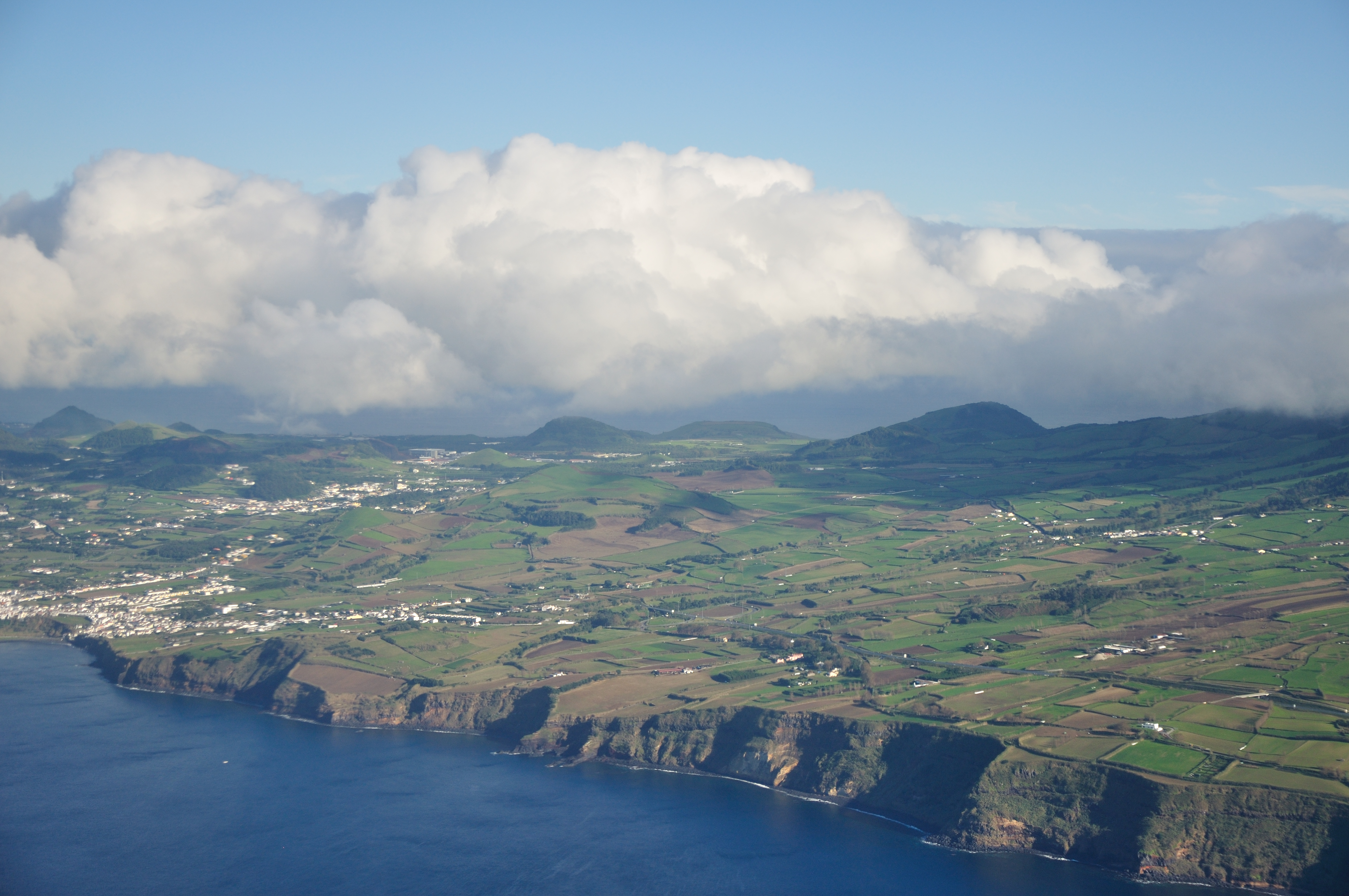
A view of the varied landscapes, including urban centre, rural pasturelands and mountainous interior

The municipality is located on the southern coast of São Miguel, and nestled between the three larger municipalities of Ponta Delgada (to the west), Ribeira Grande (in the north) and Vila Franca do Campo (on the eastern frontier); its municipal seat is approximately nine kilometers from the principal city on the island (Ponta Delgada). It was created on April 11, 1522 by royal decree from King D. João III, and although the municipal seat was temporarily assigned to Água de Pau, it is currently occupied by the urbanized core of Nossa Senhora do Rosário and Santa Cruz.

Its small territory is relatively rich in biodiversity, influenced by its differentiated environmental characteristics between the Fogo volcano (the Serra de Água de Pau) and the volcanic complex of Picos. Most of this space is occupied by pasturelands, cultivated tracts and, along the coast, an urbanized core. The cryptomeria, acacia and eucalyptus are just some of the variety of trees that populate the forests in the interior, while along the southern flank of Fogo, there are many endemic species of Erica azorica, Calluna vulgaris, the cedro-do-mato (Juniperus oxicedrus) the pau branco (Picconia azorica).

==== Ecoregions & protected areas ====
- Ponta da Galera – with an area of 220 ha (195 ha coast), the 7180 meter long coastal habitat has been designated under the Rede Natura 2000 designation (Code PTMIG0020) as a protected habitat, due to its number of shallow bays and coves, endemic vegetation, marine environments and species of flora and fauna. In addition to the Azorean heather (Erica azorica) and carnations (Spergularia azorica), the area is known as a home for pods of Harbour porpoise (Phocoena phocoena), Common bottlenose dolphin (Tursiops truncatus), the Loggerhead sea turtle (Caretta caretta), as well as avian species of shearwaters (Calonectris diomedea boreallis) and Sterna.

=== Climate ===
The climate is, like much of the archipelago, temperate and maritime; the mean annual temperature is about 17 °C (63 °F), February being the coldest month 13.4 °C (56.1 °F)) and August the warmest (21.6 °C (70.9 °F)). The mean annual humidity is approximately 83%.

=== Human geography ===
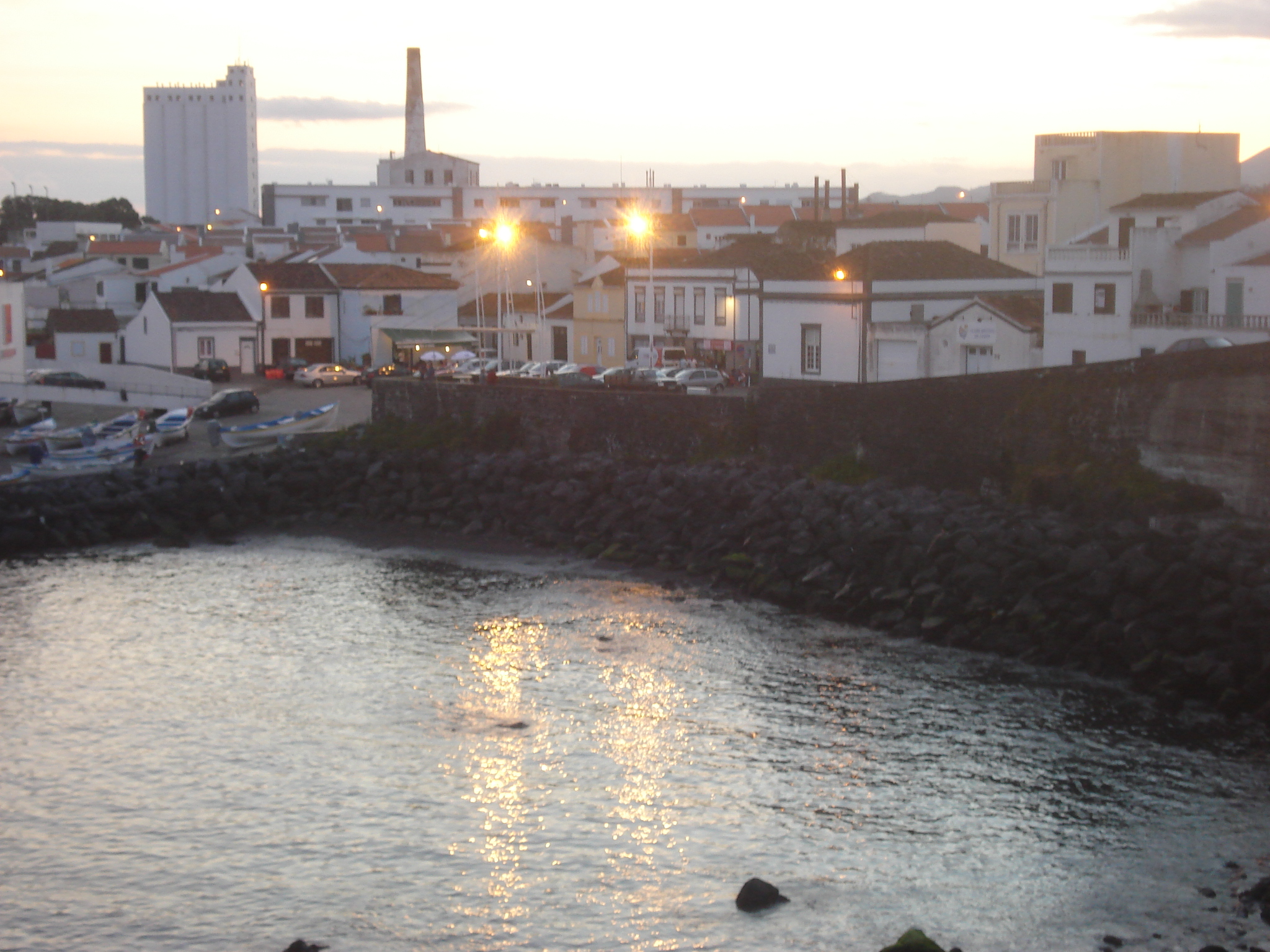
Sunset over the skyline in Nossa Senhora do Rosário, from Porto dos Carneiros

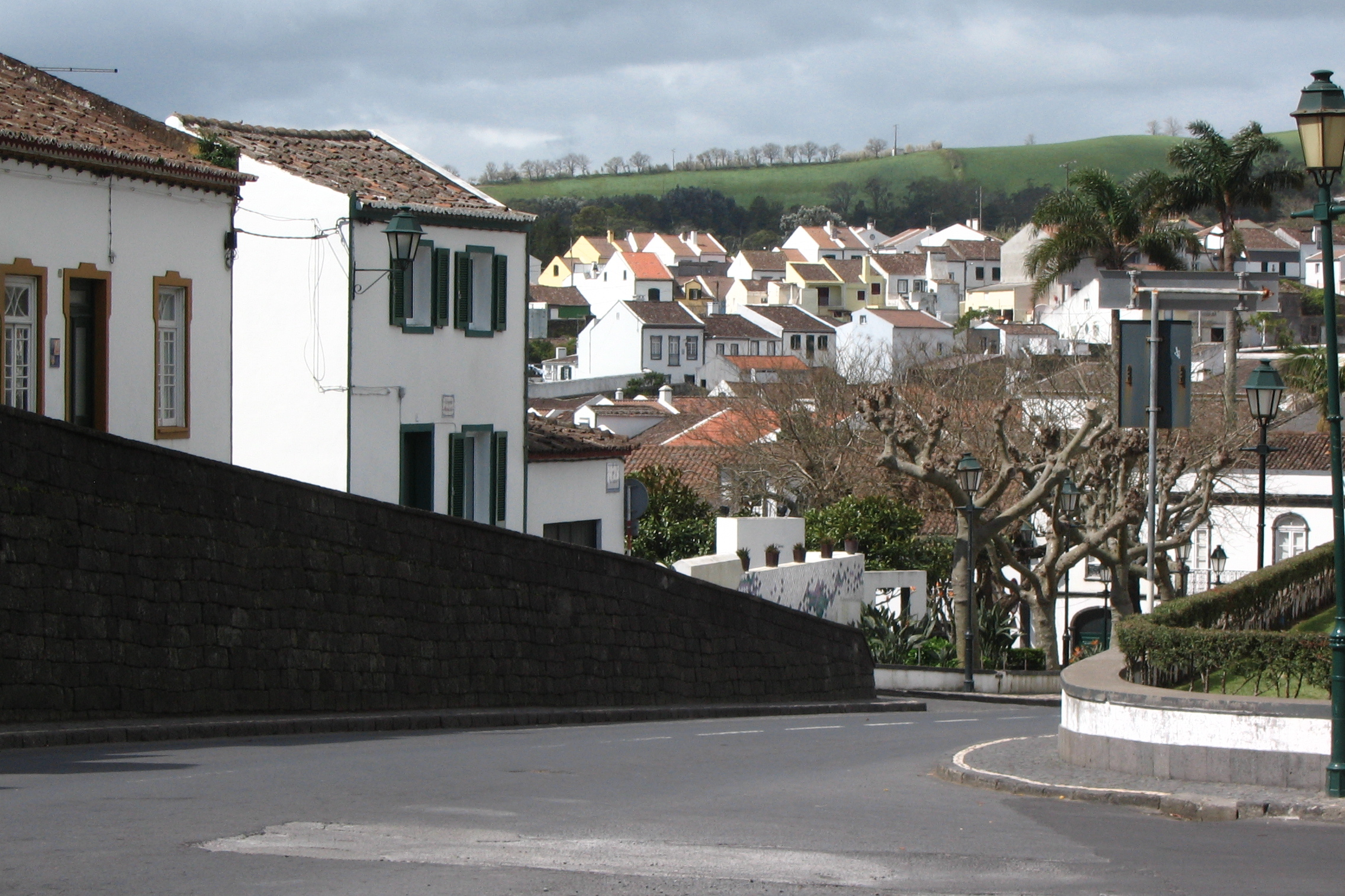
A view from street level of Água do Pau

The population consists of 7010 men and 7010 women, of whom 43.9% are between 0–25 years of age (the local average is about 38.4%), while 1288 (or 9.1%) are 65 years or greater. This population has seen a constant increase, beginning at the end of the 1920s, until today. This was briefly interrupted at the end of the 1960s, with a wave of emigration (5% decrease in population) to the United States and Canada. Before this period, the 10.2% decrease in the population was attributed to the participation of many youth in the Portuguese contingent in World War I, and the post-war epidemic that developed. In the 1980s, the population has slowly rebounded (0.4%), while growth has marked in the 1990s, with 9.5% increase in population (1226 new residents).

Since 1950, Lagoa has been constantly evolving, and in 2001 the residential area encompassed 4385 homes, that included many of the older heritage dwellings that have survived since colonization. Between 1991 and 2001, there was a 36% growth in the number of occupied dwellings in the urbanized core, while the communities of Água de Pau and Santa Cruz have also grown markedly (25.3% and 24.3%, respectively). Administratively, five parishes comprise the municipality of Lagoa, with two specifically part of the urbanized core of the village (Nossa Senhora do Rosário and Santa Cruz); they are:

- Água de Pau – until 1853, the municipal seat of Lagoa, its 3,122 residents, are scattered in the foothills of the Fogo volcano crater and is primarily an agricultural community that also includes the coastal "resort" of Caloura;
- Cabouco – named after the existence of many rock quarries in the area, the settlement of Cabouco is a landlocked parish that includes 1,736 inhabitants, and considered the most actively growing residential community in the municipality;
- Nossa Senhora do Rosário – along with Santa Cruz, this parish constitutes the urbanized core of Lagoa, with a population of 5,501 inhabitants in 2001, encompassing the areas known as Athalhada, São Pedro and Porto dos Carneiros along the southerly part of the Atlantic coast;
- Ribeira Chã – the community, with 366 residents, straddles the river-valleys at the foot of the Serra de Água de Pau and was once part of the neighboring parish of Água de Alto (in the municipality of Vila Franca do Campo)
- Santa Cruz – with 3,501 residents, the parish comprises the areas of Remédios and Santa Cruz, representing the place where the first settlers disembarked and established the community that would be known as Lagoa.

== International Relations ==
Lagoa is twinned with:

- Bristol County, Massachusetts, United States of America

== Economy ==
The 2001 Portuguese census identified a population of 5575 residents active in the workforce; 42.7% are employed: 85.5% as workers and 5% owners/proprietors, while the remainder pertain to unclassified classes, homemakers or active members of the local cooperative. The census further concludes that 848 companies (private or public) have headquarters in the municipality, equivalent to 4.8% of the Azores, and showing a 26.4% increase between 2001 and 2004. These companies are primarily construction firms, but also include gross and domestic retail, repair (automobile, motorcycle or domestic goods), although agriculture is the primary economic beneficiary. Between 2001 and 2004, activities in agricultural production, livestock, hunting and forestry have seen a 48.4% growth.

The tertiary sector is the primary employer in the municipality; 58.5% of the population identify themselves as public servants, accounting for a 17.8% growth (2001–2004), while hotelier and restaurants show a 44.2% growth during the same period. Recently, Lagoa has developed a tourist infrastructure associated in character with its historic past, but primarily its resort centers (for example, Caloura, in Água de Pau), bays, coves and beaches (such as Baixa d´Areia), traditional farms and older buildings (like the old monastery of Vale de Cabaços, commonly known as the Convento da Caloura) have attracted new visitors. Hotels and associated bed & breakfast-type residencias are common, with the 4-star Caloura Hotel Resort the primary tourist destination.

== Tourism ==
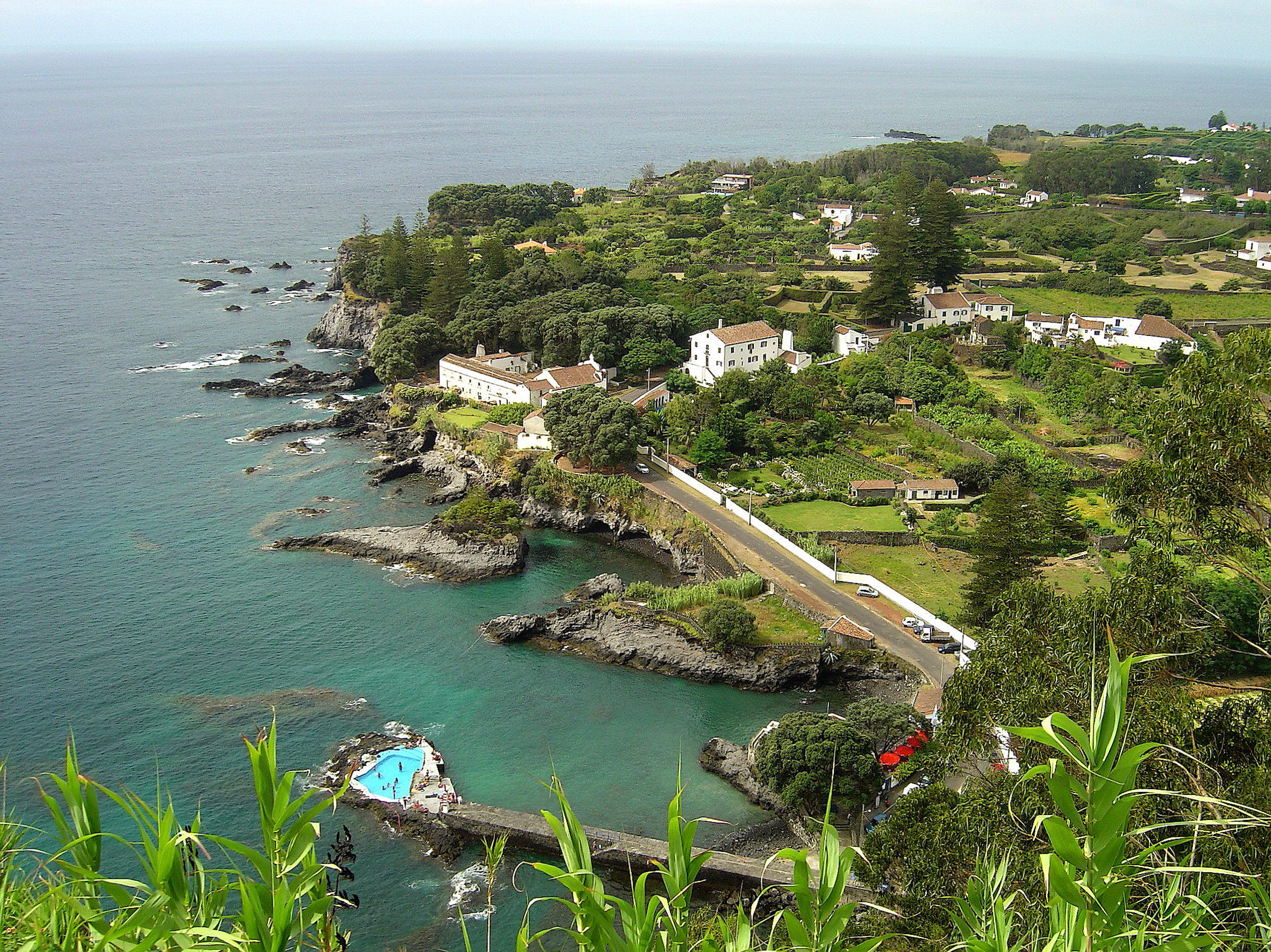
The hamlet of Caloura, as seen from the Pisão Outlook

The municipality of Lagoa has many recognized natural environments and areas popular with tourists to the island of São Miguel. Its tourist ex-libris is the small resort hamlet of Caloura, nestled along the southern coast and separated from the neighboring community of Água de Alto. Although it does not include a beach, the sheltered coves and volcanic rock bays are popular with locals and tourists for the clear blue-green waters, a natural pool and fisherman's port, as well as a bar and esplanade. The area benefits from a favourable microclimate, that offers visitors the opportunity to swim in the transparent waters of its port which has earned the area a Blue Flag designation. Throughout the year there are diverse cultural events, the most relevant is the Festa do Pescador ("Festival of the Fisherman"), in addition to folklore festivals and nautical themed events, that attract local residents to the village. Access to Caloura is made by an ancillary connection to the regional road in Água de Pau.

In Água de Pau, from Pico da Figueira, the Monte Santo Outlook is popular with tourists for the panoramas of the municipality, and further above, along the Regional Road between Água de Pau and Ribeira Chã, the outlook of Pisão provides vistas of Caloura, Ribeira Chã and parts of the neighboring municipality of Vila Franca do Campo. Within the village, the Jardim dos Anjos, was begun during the 1970s and remodeled in 1991, and is a situated in front of the parochial church of Nossa Senhora dos Anjos.

In the civil parish of Santa Cruz, the Forest Park of Chã da Macela, located in the eastern foothills of Serra de Água de Pau, is a large park with endemic (laurel, heather, fir) and introduced species (cryptomeria, acacias, and pine). The Park of Convento dos Franciscanos is also an important tourist attraction in the parish.

The Praça de Nossa Senhora da Graça, a square in Lagoa is also another place of leisure that includes an open-air amphitheater, used in local cultural and recreational events. Similarly, the Largo de Ville Sainte Thérèse, in Rosário, was realized by contributions and partnerships signed in 1996 between the municipality and the Ville de Sainte Thérèse, in Canada: it symbolizes the friendship between the two communities.

The civil parish of Nossa Senhora do Rosário, is recognized for the Porto dos Carneiros, a small bay where the first settlers and fisherman disembarked; it is the original port where those colonists landed cattle and provisions for the original settlers. Its location has been expanded and remodeled in the 20th century to both support the local community and to attract tourists to the Mercado de Peixe and restaurants along the port. The main attraction along the southern coast of Roário is the open-air Complexo Municipal de Piscinas (pool complex); situated along Rua Cidade de New Bedford, the complex combines natural, semi-olympic and children's artificial pools with infrastructures (an esplanade, changing rooms, bathrooms and parking facilities. It is large rocky outcropping that extends for 150 meters was reconstructed on December 26, 1996 after the original municipal pools were damaged during a winter tempest.

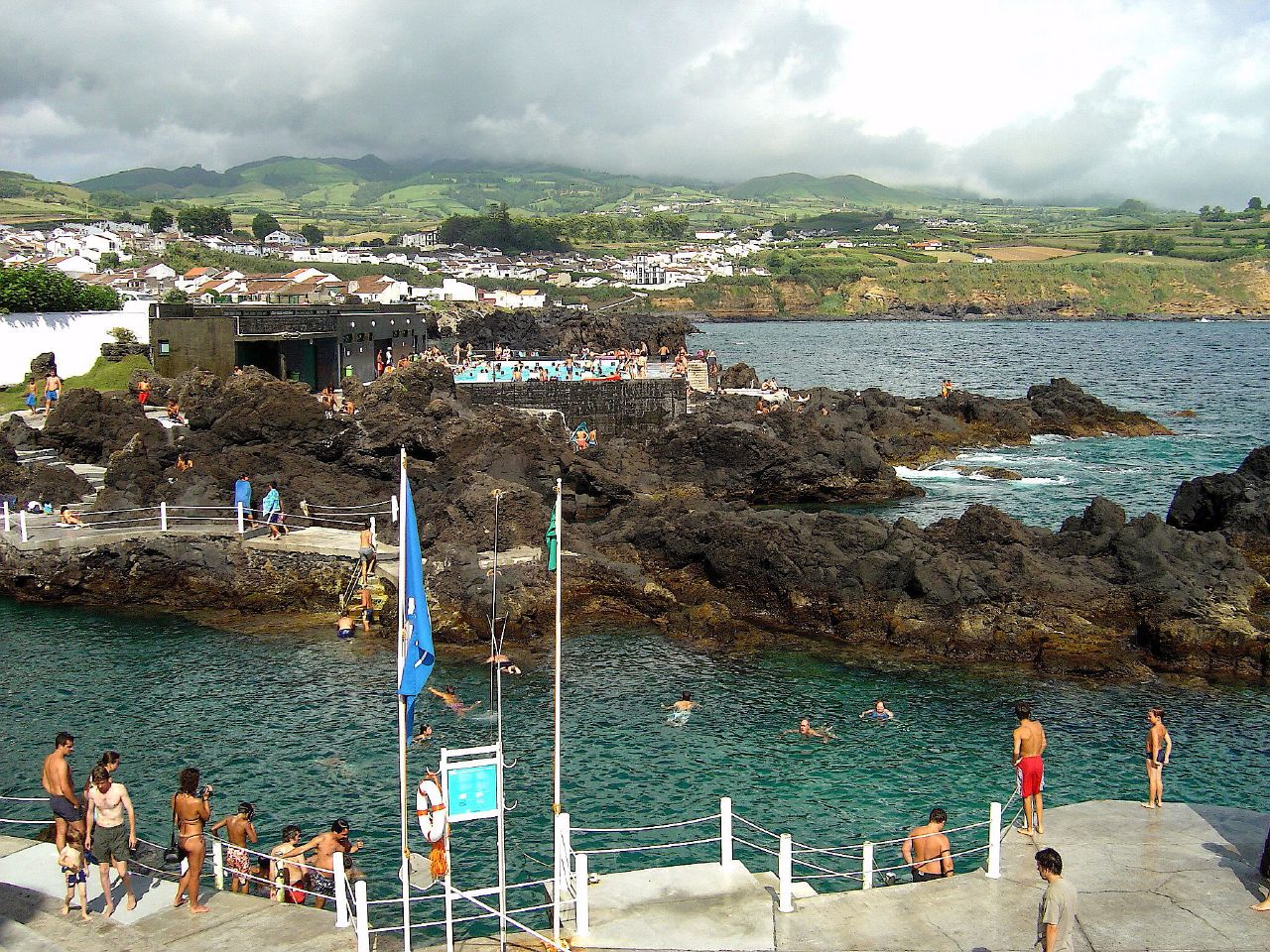
The pool complex integrates natural pools...

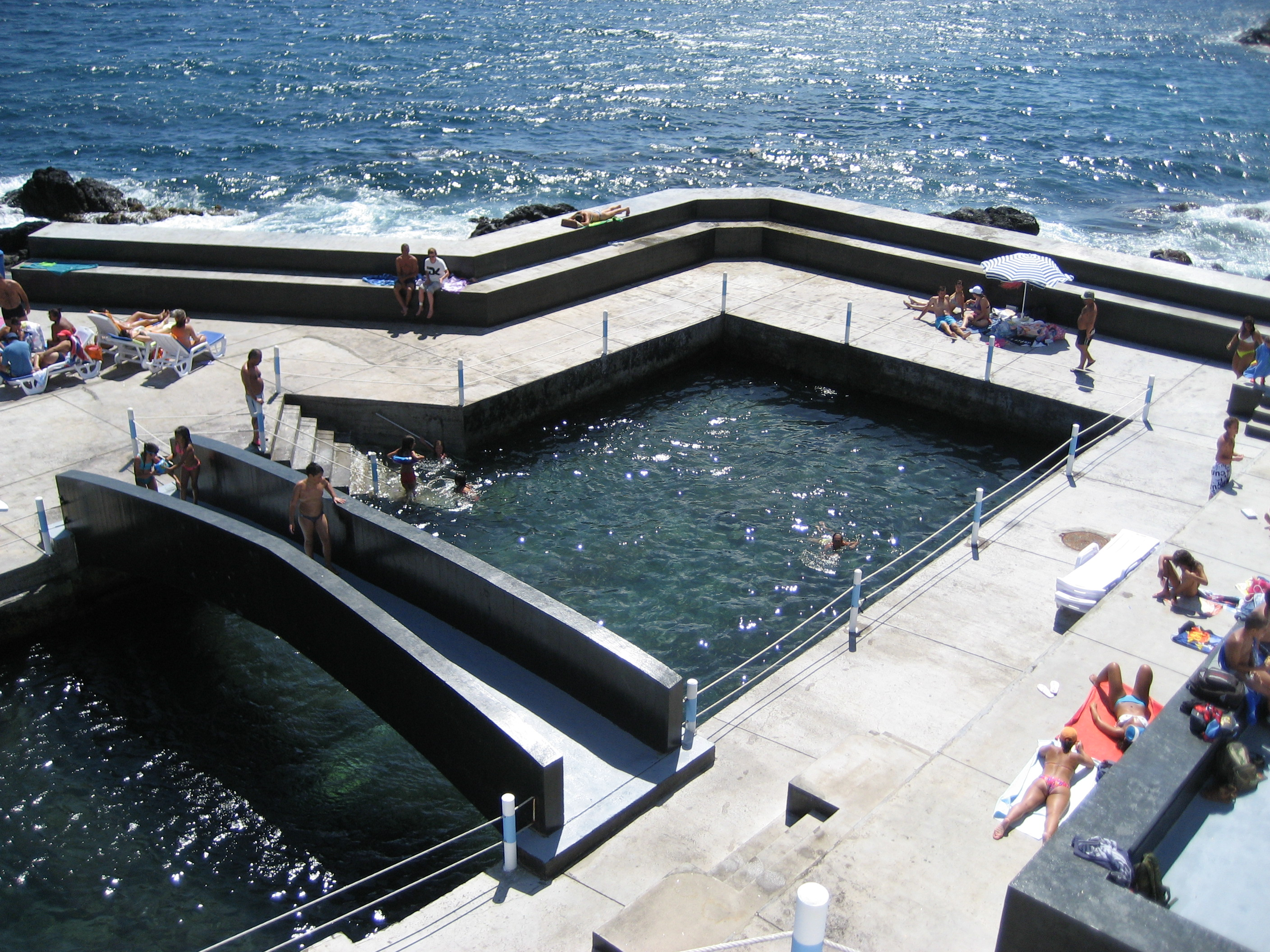
...becalmed natural pools...

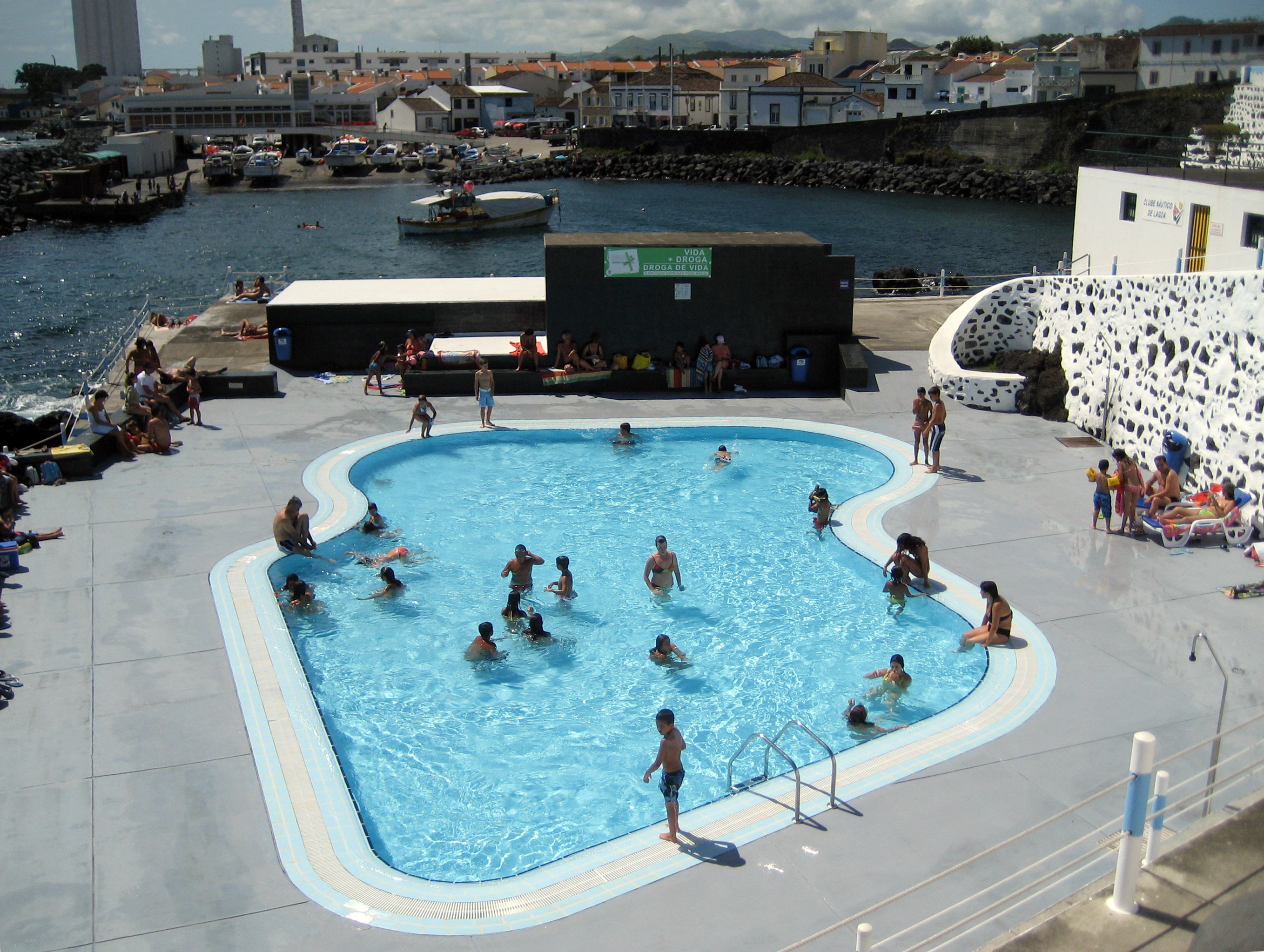
...and pools suitable for children.

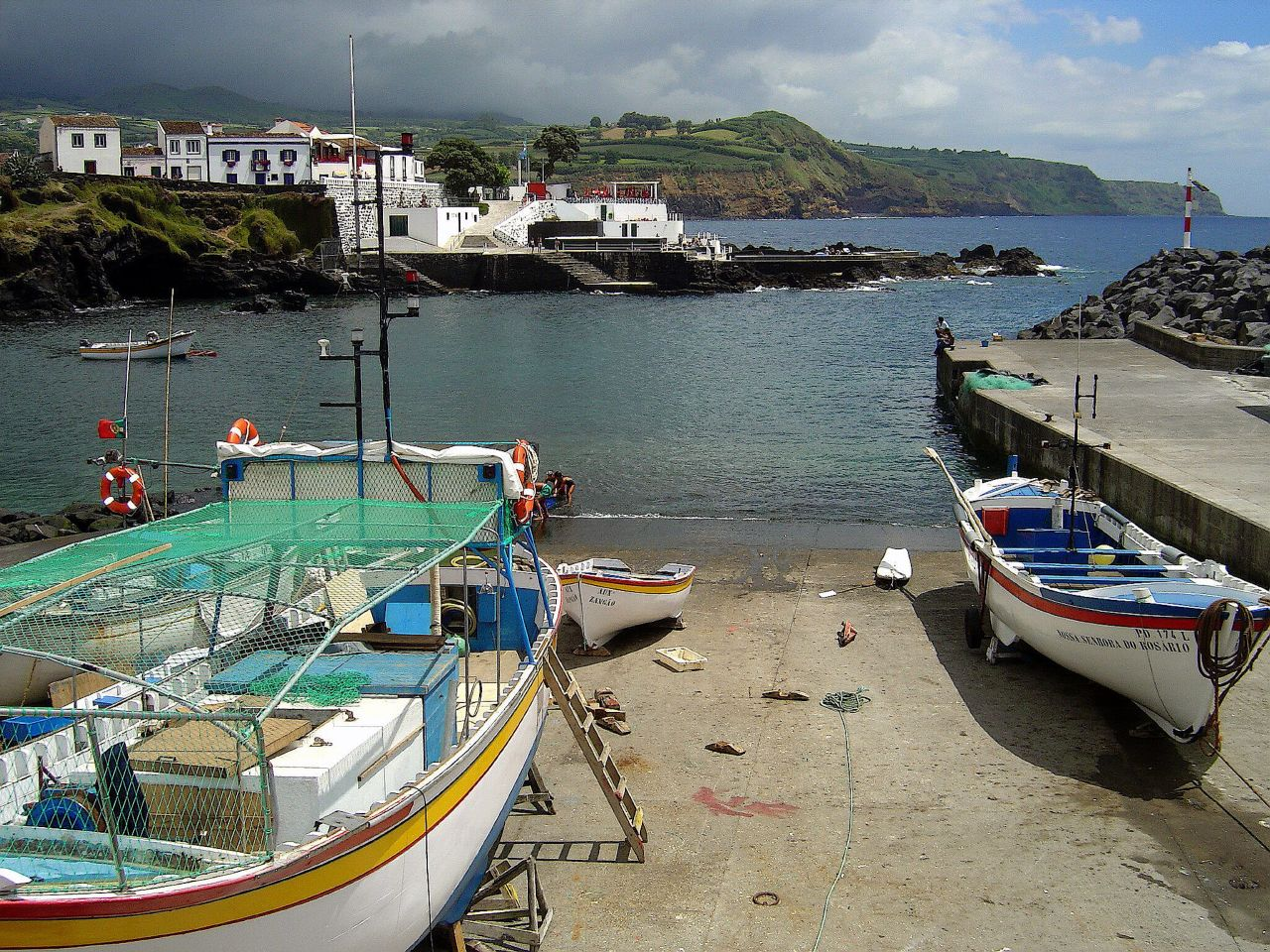
Opposite to this bath complex: Porto dos Carneiros, fishing harbour

== Architecture ==
=== Civic ===
- Praça Velha – situated near the Matriz Church of Santa Cruz, this square is at the heart of the earliest settlements, with many older buildings and the original municipal offices.
- Rua Almeida Garrett – associated with early settlement, it has many architectural examples of the period.
- Largo D. João III – in Santa Cruz, the site of the Paços do Concelho (municipal offices) demonstrating an harmony between contemporary and 19th-century architecture, it was recently expanded by José Lamas/Carlos Duarte (between 1993 and 96).
- Solar do Fisher and Casa da Atalhada – two examples of homes of the high nobility of the 18th century, with grande porticos, ancillary patios and constructed by local volcanic rocks.
- Chafariz de Água de Pau – one of twenty four stone fountains created to support the water needs of the local community in the 18th and 19th centuries; the main fountain is located in the Largo de São Pedro, and constructed in 1836.
- Casa do Capitão-Mor – located in the Rua da Natividade, the house of the Captain-major was the residence of João Policarpo Botelho de Arruda, an example of the 18th- and 19th-century architecture.
- Junta de Freguesia de Água de Pau – the civil parish office building, constructed in the 18th century, by the father of the old Captain-major of the villa of Água de Pau. It is a rectangular building, with a front facade of basalt rock, a private park and an older chapel, utilized as offices by the local mayor. This building is also referred to as the Casa da Estrela ("House of the Star") because its owner, in the first half of the 20th century, Floriano Vítor Borges (who was responsible for many of the large public works on the island of São Miguel), who placed a copper star on the main door of the building.

=== Religious ===
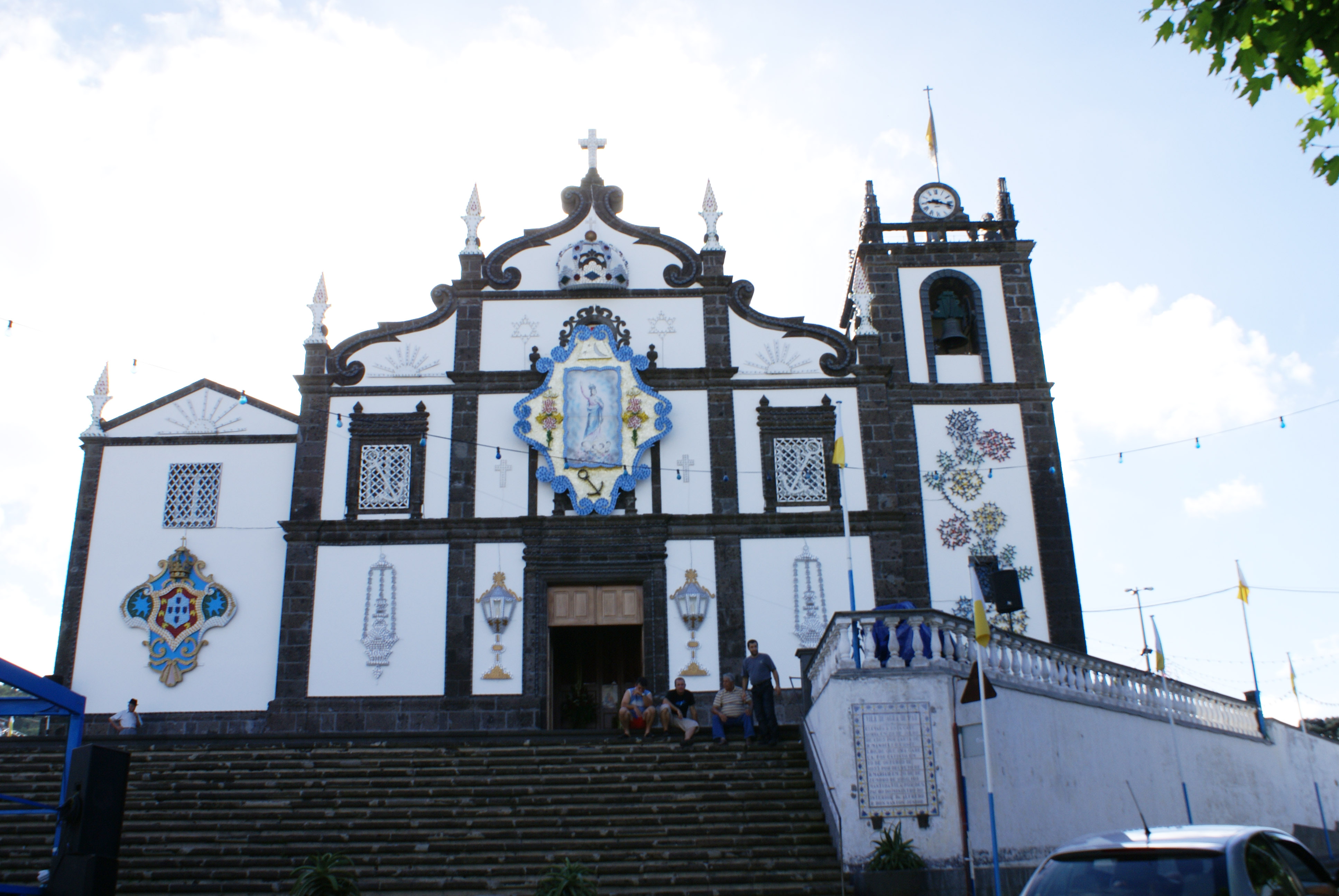
Parochial Church of Nossa Senhora dos Anjos is the primary church in Água de Pau

- Convent of Caloura (Portuguese: Convento da Caloura/Recolhimento da Caloura), the convent and annex chapel of Nossa Senhora das Dores is located in the resort of the same name. The main nave of the church is covered in polychromatic azulejo tile, with the main altar covered in gold leaf, in addition to strange images of bearded angels. Until 1541, the convent was a residence for many nuns, and later replaced by monks owing to constant attacks by pirates in the area. An image of Senhor Santo Cristo dos Milagres, gifted by the Pope, resided with the nuns for many years before migrating to the Convent of Esperança, in Ponta Delgada. The convent is currently private property.
- Church of Santa Cruz (Portuguese: Igreja Paroquial de Santa Cruz/Igreja de Santa Cruz), originally constructed in the 16th, the front facade and bell tower of this church located in the parish of Santa Cruz was constructed in 1844, and its interior is highlighted by Manueline-style chapel and ornamented pulpit extracted from the older convent of São Francisco in Ponta Delgada (dating back to 9 October 1782);
- Franciscan Convent – dating back to the 18th century, the convent is one of the richest architectural objects in the municipality; its church, to the invocation of Saint Anthony, was designed in the baroque-style, and its interior is highlighted by worked altar and image of Nossa Senhora da Conceição.
- Parochial Church of Nossa Senhor do Rosário – located in the parish of the same name, it was built on an older chapel from the 16th century; the current building dates back to the 18th century that expanded the space to include three naves, and populated by sculptures designed by Machado do Castro (18th century).
- Parochial Church of Nossa Senhora da Misericórdia – located in Cabouco, and built in 1847 to substitute an older chapel, this is a small temple with three naves built with local stone.
- Parochial Church of Nossa Senhora dos Anjos – In the village of Água de Pau, it is located on a small hill along the main regional road passing through the village. This church received was "decorated" by King D. Manuel I, for the services of several local men, but the church was destroyed during the 1522 Vila Franca earthquake. The new temple was begun in 1525, and completed in the baroque-style in 1744, expanding the interior to three naves, a royal coat-of-arms and rich panels of azulejos.
- Parochial Church of Ribeira Chã – in the parish of the same name, this church is dedicated to Saint Joseph, a contemporary design that was built to replace the 1853 temple, with modern images created by Álvaro França and mosaics by Tomás Borba Vieira.
- Chapel of Nossa Senhora do Cabo – a 17th-century chapel whose front facade is covered in azulejo.
- Chapel of Nossa Senhora dos Remédios – a 16th-century chapel in the local community of Remédios, with azulejo painted in a Hispanic-Arab-style and curious image of their patron saint.
- Chapel of Nossa Senhora do Monte Santo – located on a hill in Água de Pau, this chapel was created after a Marian apparition by a local child, Maria Joana Tavares do Canto, a friend and along with approximately 12,000 people witnessed an apparition of the Virgin Mary on July 5, 1918. The chapel was constructed by the parents of Maria Joana, in a hexagonal design with an image of Nossa Senhora do Monte alongside the altar. In 1998, with the authorization of the Bishop of the Azores, an illuminated-cross was constructed behind the chapel by the Associação Católica Cristo Jovem.
- Chapel of São Pedro – located in the cemetery of Água do Pau in 1907, and extended in 2000 to include a museum.
- Chapel of São Tiago – located in the Largo do Santiago in Água do Pau, it was constructed in 1700 and dedicated to the Apostle James; since 1986, it has been used as a mortuary chapel.

== Notable citizens ==
- João Leite de Bettencourt (1916 in Nossa Senhora do Rosário – 1973) chemist, industrialist and politician.
- João Ventura (born 1994 in Rosário) a Portuguese footballer with over 170 club caps
