= João Nogueira (footballer) =

Portuguese footballer

Personal information
- Full name: João Pedro Salgado Nogueira
- Date of birth: 27 March 1986 (age 40)
- Place of birth: Fafe, Portugal
- Height: 1.72 m (5 ft 7 1/2 in)
- Position: Midfielder

Team information
- Current team: Fafe
- Number: 10

Youth career
- 1998–2005: Fafe

Senior career*
Years	Team	Apps	(Gls)
2005–	Fafe	161	(10)
2005–2006	→ Arões (loan)		
- * Club domestic league appearances and goals as of 15 March 2017

João Pedro Salgado Nogueira (born 27 March 1986) is a Portuguese football player who plays for Fafe.

== Club career ==
He made his professional debut in the Segunda Liga for Fafe on 6 August 2016 in a game against Braga B.
