= João Pedro (footballer, born 2004) =

Brazilian footballer

Personal information
- Full name: João Pedro de Sá Mendonça
- Date of birth: 20 January 2004 (age 22)
- Position: Midfielder

Team information
- Current team: Żabbar St. Patrick
- Number: 31

Youth career
- –2021: Botafogo-SP
- 2022–2023: Atlético Goianiense

Senior career*
| Years | Team | Apps | (Gls) |
| 2021–2022 | Botafogo-SP | 1 | (0) |
| 2024– | Żabbar St. Patrick | 24 | (1) |
- * Club domestic league appearances and goals as of 26 June 2025

João Pedro de Sá Mendonça (born 20 January 2004), simply known as João Pedro, is a Brazilian professional footballer who plays as a midfielder for Żabbar St. Patrick in the Maltese Premier League.

== Career statistics ==
=== Club ===
As of 28 April 2021.

| Club | Season | League | | | State League | | Cup | | Continental | | Other | | Total | |
| Club | Season | Division | Apps | Goals | Apps | Goals | Apps | Goals | Apps | Goals | Apps | Goals | Apps | Goals |
|---|---|---|---|---|---|---|---|---|---|---|---|---|---|---|
| Botafogo-SP | 2021 | Série C | 0 | 0 | 1 (Note: Appearances in the Campeonato Paulista) | 0 | 0 | 0 | — | | 0 | 0 | 1 | 0 |
| Career total | | | 0 | 0 | 1 | 0 | 0 | 0 | 0 | 0 | 0 | 0 | 1 | 0 |
