= Santa Cruz (Lagoa) =

- Civil parish
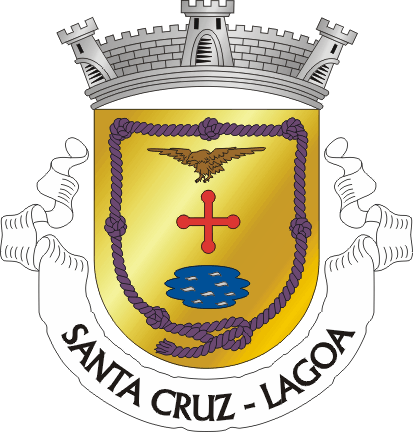
- Coat of arms

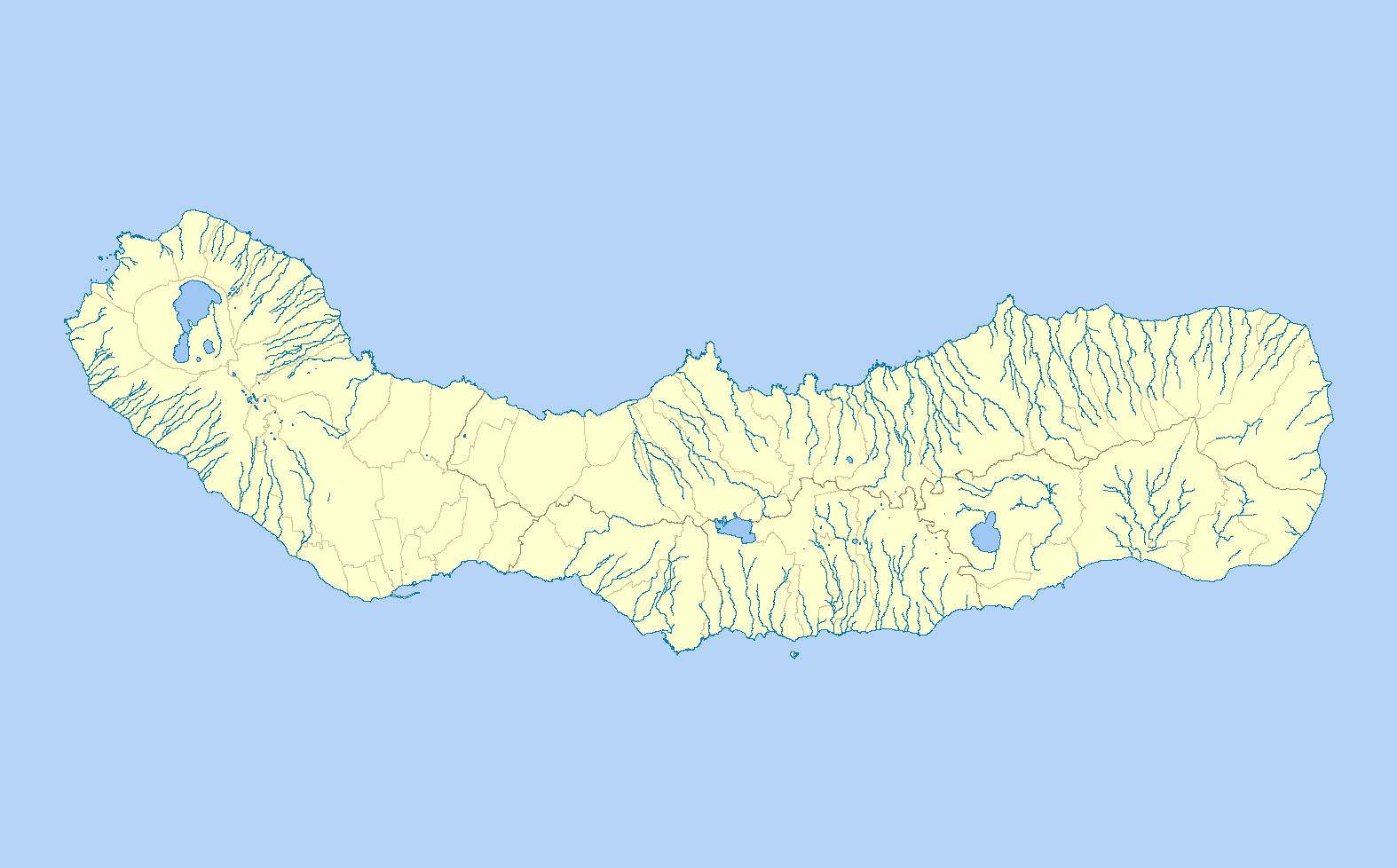
- Location in the Azores Santa Cruz (São Miguel)
- Coordinates: 37°45′1″N 25°32′27″W
- Country: Portugal
- Auton. region: Azores
- Island: São Miguel
- Municipality: Lagoa

Area
  - Total: 14.27 km^{2} (5.51 sq mi)
- Elevation: 193 m (633 ft)

Population (2011)
  - Total: 3,671
  - Density: 260/km^{2} (670/sq mi)
- Time zone: UTC−01:00 (AZOT)
  - Summer (DST): UTC+00:00 (AZOST)
- Postal code: 9560-140
- Area code: 292
- Website: cm-lagoa.azoresdigital.pt

Santa Cruz (Portuguese for Holy Cross) is a parish in the municipality of Lagoa in the Azores. The population in 2011 was 3,671, in an area of 14.27 km^{2}. It contains the localities Cabo da Vila and Remédios.
