= Fort of São João Baptista of Praia Formosa =

Maritime fort in Santa Maria, Portugal

Fort of São João Baptista
- Forte de São João Baptista
- Santa Maria, Eastern Azores in Portugal
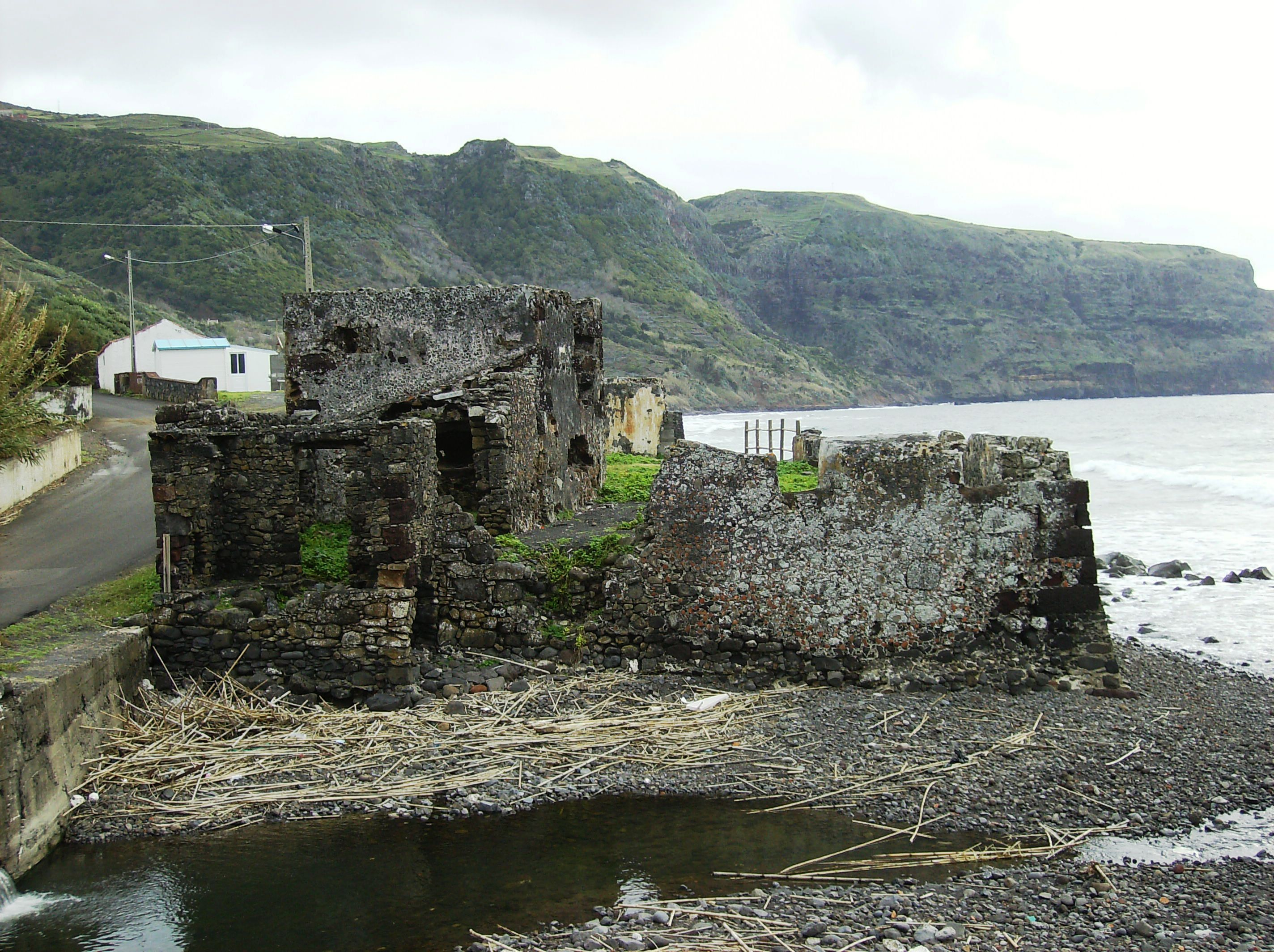
- A view of the ruins of the fort of São João Baptista at the mouth of the Ribeira da Praia

Site information
- Type: Fort
- Owner: Portuguese Republic
- Operator: Câmara Municipal da Vila do Porto
- Open to the public: Public

Location
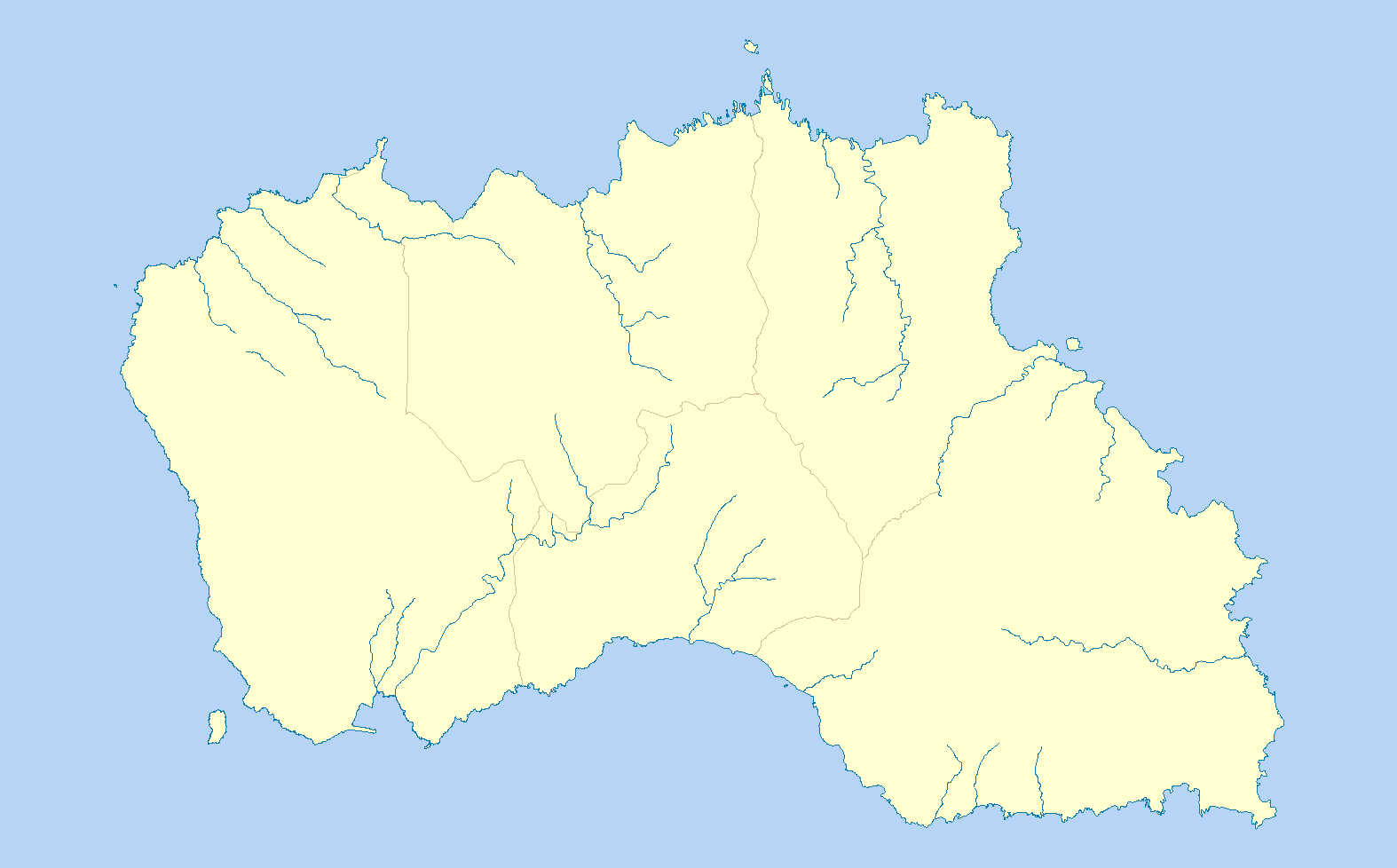
- Location of the fort within the municipality of Vila do Porto
- Coordinates: 36°57′5.85″N 25°6′4.79″W

Site history
- Built: 16th century
- Materials: Basalt

The Fort of São João Baptista (Portuguese: Forte de São João Baptista/Castelo da Praia) is the ruins of a 16th-century maritime fort situated on the western edge of Praia Formoso, in the civil parish of Almagreira, municipality of Vila do Porto, on the Portuguese island of Santa Maria (in the archipelago of the Azores).

Located in a strategic point along the southern coast, the fort was constructed to defend the anchorage from attacks by pirates and corsairs, that frequented this region of the Atlantic during the Age of Discovery. Contemporary archaeological campaigns during the 20th century attempted to ascertain if this forte constituted one of the oldest in the archipelago, yet this never conclusively validated by documented sources. In fact, the oldest forts in the Azores have been validated in Terceira and São Miguel: Castle of São Cristóvão (1460), in the Alto dos Moinhos, Angra do Heroísmo; the Fort of São Brás (1551) in Ponta Delgada; and the Fort of São Sebastião (1572) over the Porto das Pipas, also in Angra dor Heroísmo.

== History ==
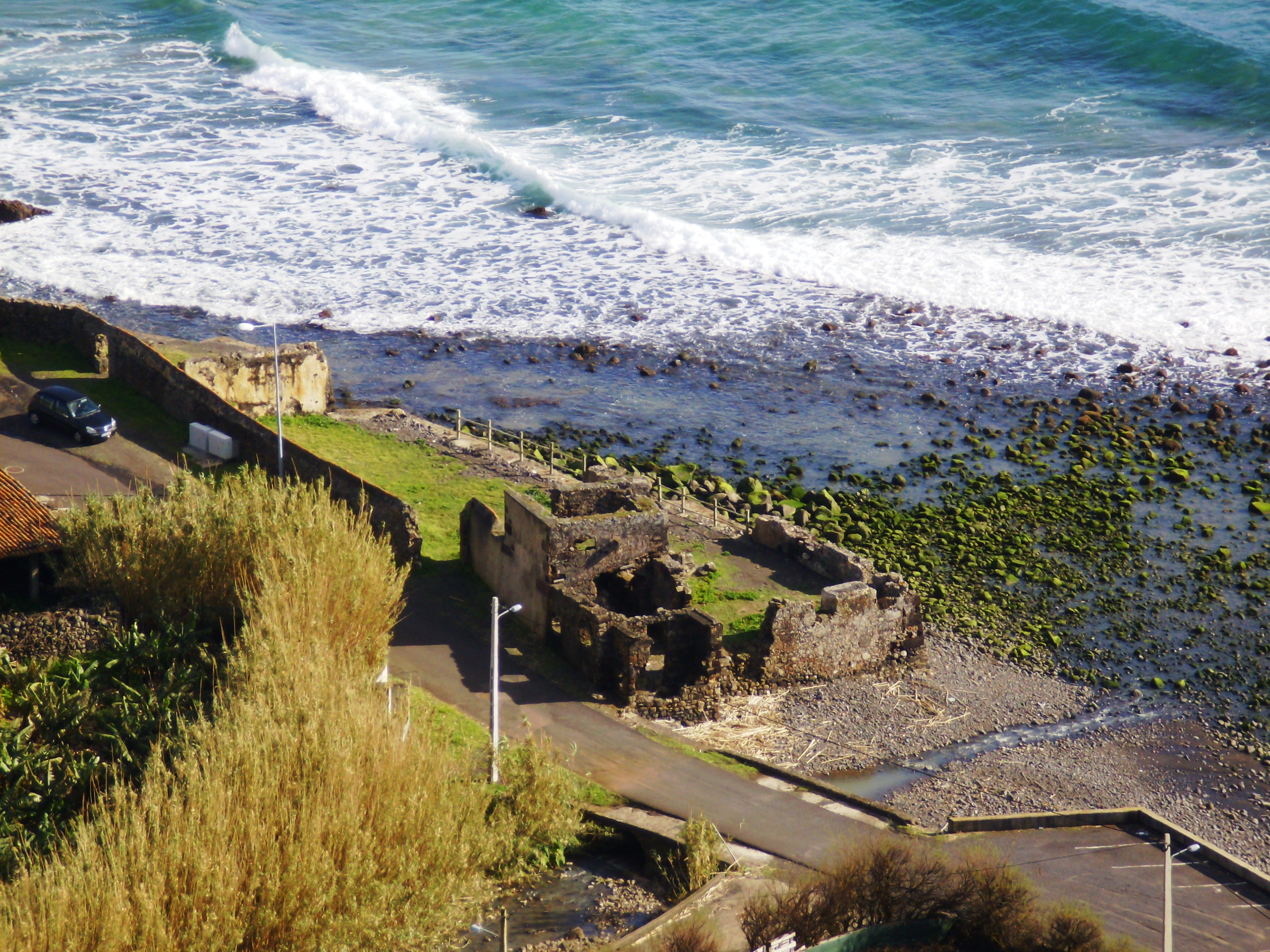
A view from the scenic overlook at the remains of the fort

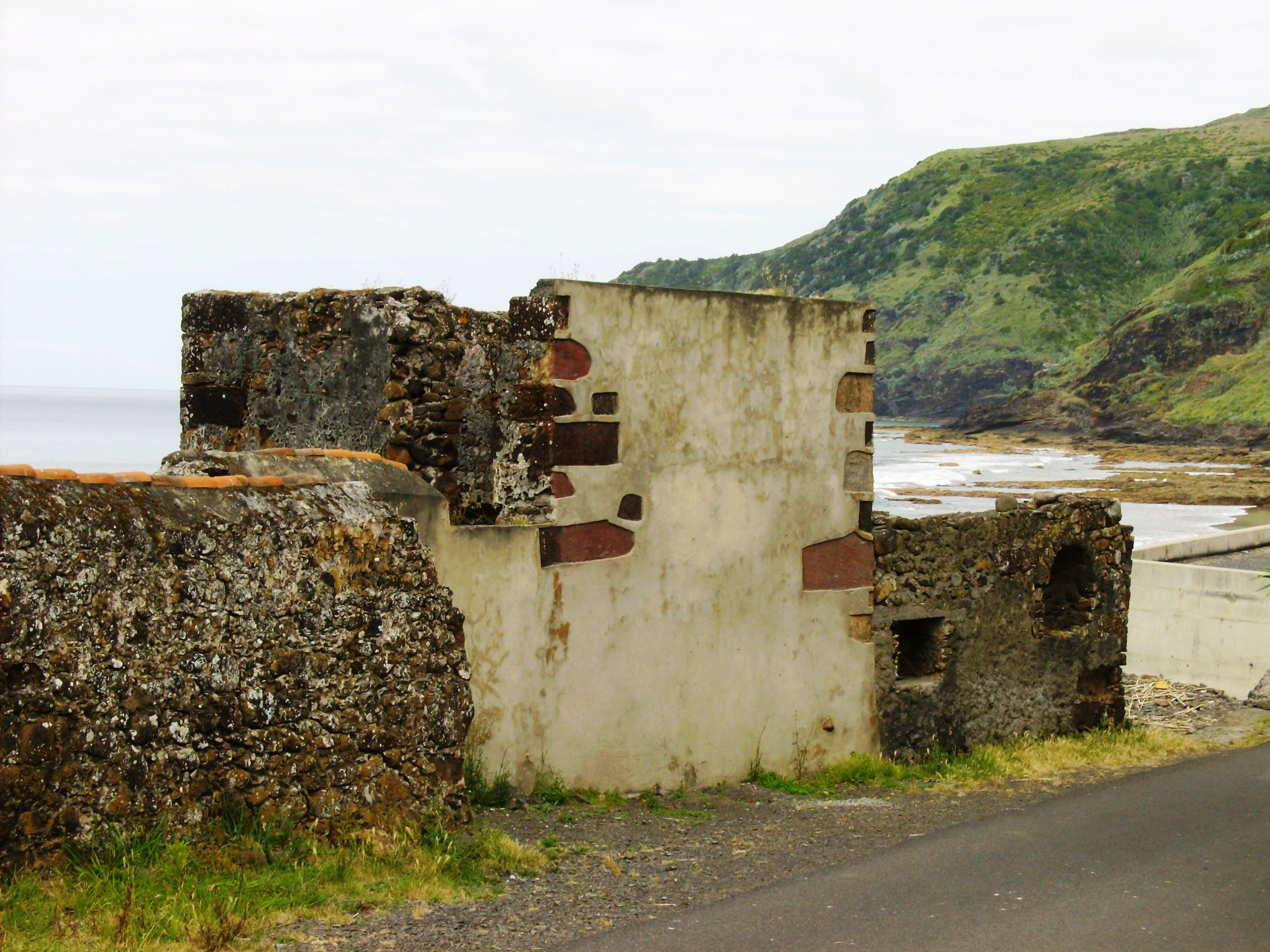
A portion of the remaining two-storey structure used for kitchen and barracks

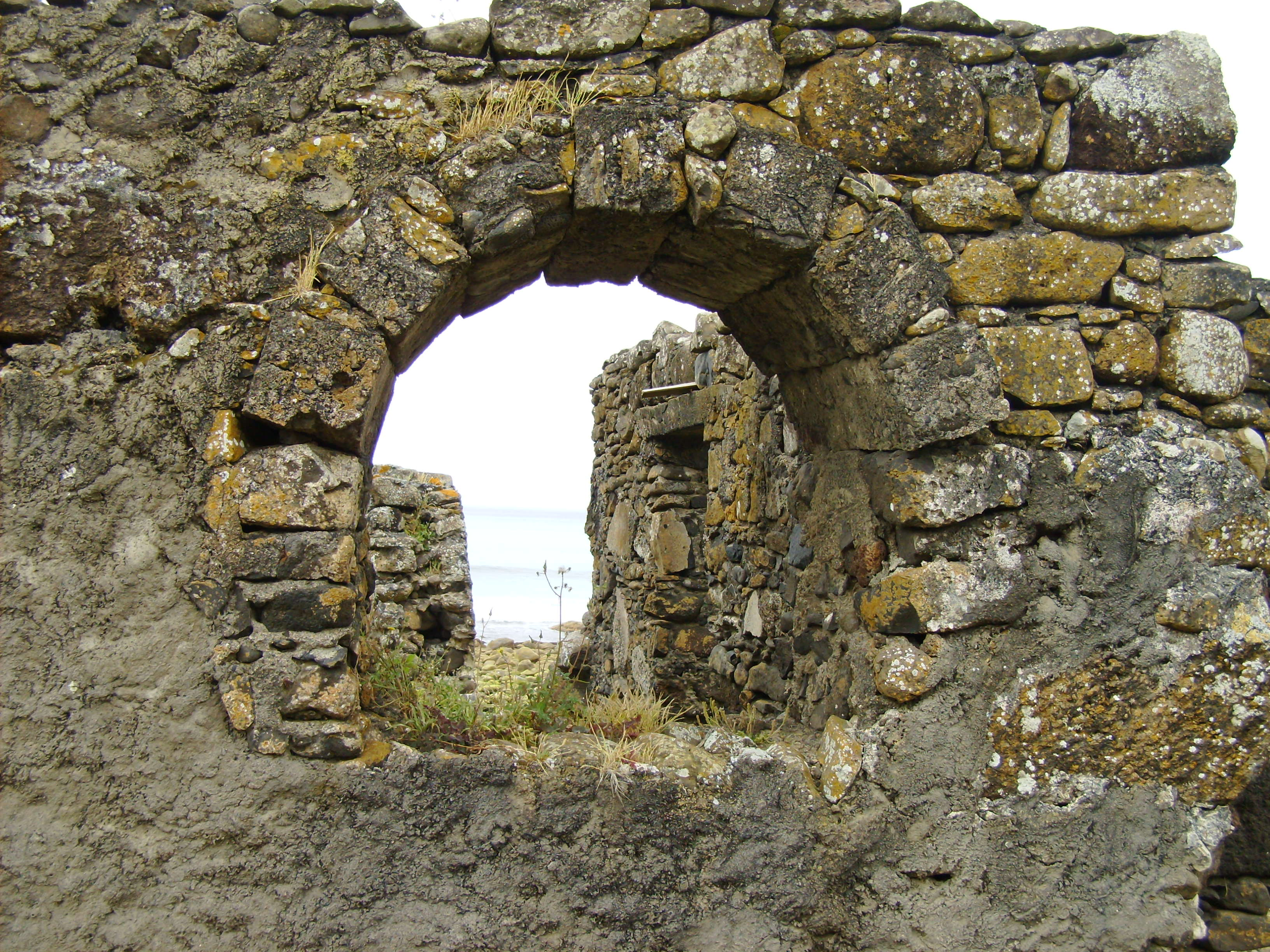
One of the openings used as windows or emplacements

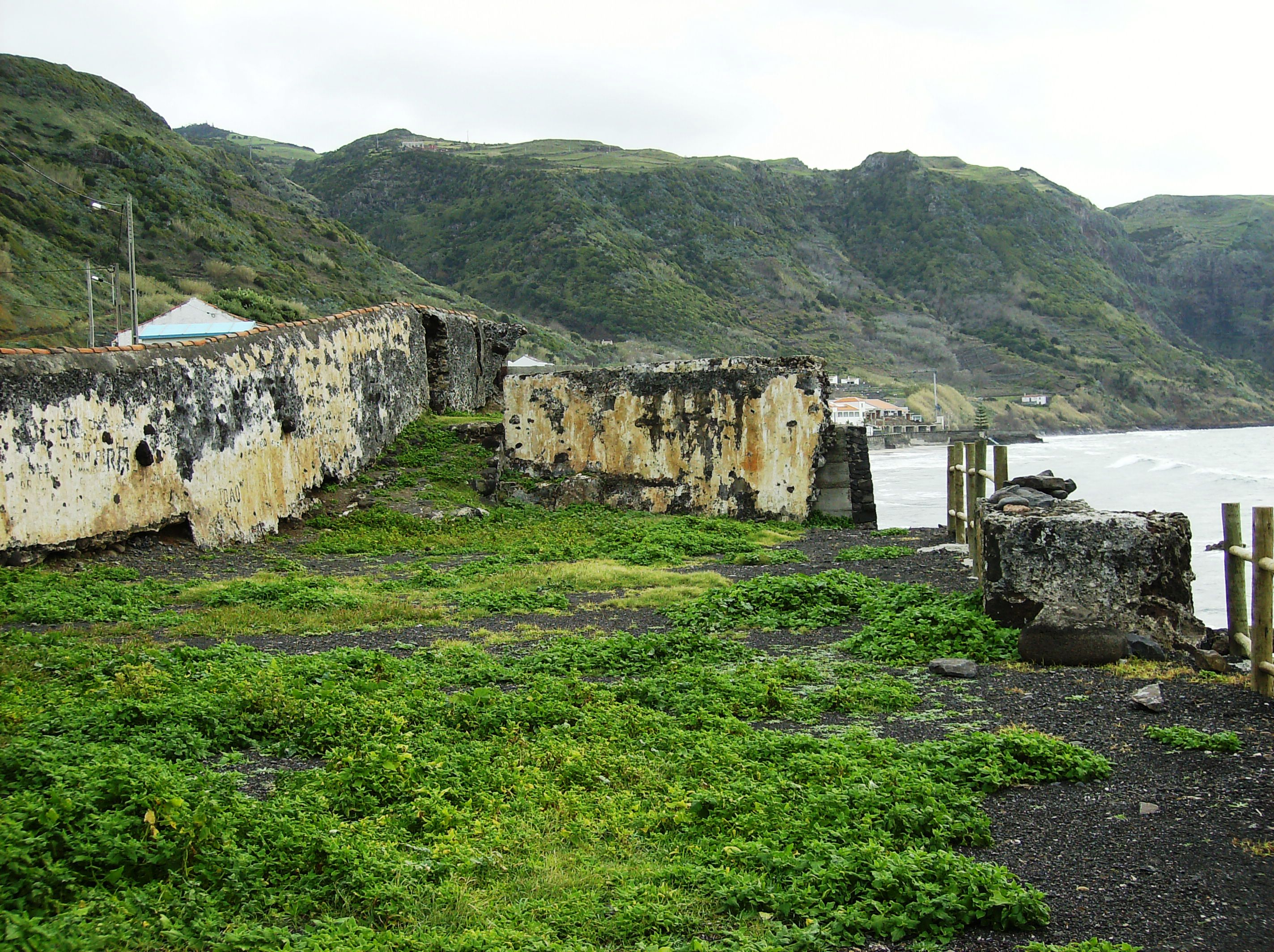
The main courtyard, used during the Maré de Agosto Festival as a secondary stage

The beach on which the fort was raised was, in 1584, referred to as Plaia Hermosa, based on the Castilian language, owing to Spanish dominion of the region at the time. The same author (Luís Teixeira), later (1587) indicated that this region served within the religious parish of Figueira (Portuguese: Paróquia da Figueira) which, before its construction, included little more than 40 people, in an area called Praia Fremosa.

English privateers (1599) and, later, Algerian Barbary coast pirates (June 1616) used this beachhead in their assaults on the island, the latter resulting in major damage to Vila do Porto. Since 1599, the towns folk had requested that some defence be constructed to protect them from further assaults:

...and it was that the (general of the militia, Manuel de Sousa), who advised the town officials, that he felt it was necessary to guard the landing, so that when there were enemies, who wished to land, that fifty adventurous men, thirty arquebus and twenty pikes were always available and diligent to whatever enemy encounter, and that he requested of the same officials, that it was necessary that over the fajã of São Lourenço, a watch over that part [of the island], and that they should look daily into a watch position, so that they could determine where it was more accommodating to place a permanent watch in the summer, over the Beach where the enemies had entered, and another at Prainha and Touril when it was necessary to defend the land...

Apparently, the initial requests were not taken seriously, and the 1616 incursion resulted in the cataclysmic destruction of Vila do Porto. In 1617, a new request was made directly to Philip III of Spain, by the third Donatary-Captain, Pedro Soares de Sousa. The memory of the 1616 catastrophe and these recommendations to the monarch, resulted in initial steps in 1618 to defend "the women and children and herds". The author of the building's construction is unknown, although it is speculated that Sergeant-major Marco de Teive, who visited the archipelago in 1630, may have had a hand in its construction, during his visit to Santa Maria. It is known that following the 1616 tragedy, in 1617 (by royal order) Captain Marcos Fernandes de Teive was sent to the islands to design and initiate construction of new battlements, in addition to reorganizing the militia.

Yet, the work on the fortifications did not progress. In 1624, in order to speed up construction, Philip IV of Spain granted Brás Soares de Sousa (in compensation for his services in North Africa), the Command of the island of Santa Maria (through the Order of Jesus Christ), with the right to his privileges as of 24 June 1623. But, many of the resources were used in Royal Service, and the monarch imposed on Brás Soares de Sousa the obligation to donate, for five years, the land rents of the command towards the fortifications necessary for the island. These lands rents would be safeguarded in a separate coffer and only spent on the construction, by order of the Finance Council. Only after the completion of the public works, would those monies would be once again used for the repairs of churches as needed, as stipulated by Council for Religious Conscience and Orders.

Two decades later (1638) the town hall registered: "A fortification on this island, that was started, but not finished." By the Restoration Wars (1640–1668), due to the difficult circumstances of the civil authorities in Vila do Porto, the Crown provided monetary funds for the defence of Praia Formosa. But, even by 1664, the issue of artillery at the site had not been resolved, even as the King had ordered their installation in 1655. By Royal decree, on 6 August 1683, Vicente Pires Ferreira was placed in the position of constable for castles and redoubts, following the death of his father, overseeing the beach of São João and its fortifications.

A few years later, Father António Cordeiro wrote of the defence of Santa Maria, referring to the castle located in Praia Formosa:

"The defence of the town, and all the island, was little before, which has a league of postos, where there could enter, and had entered three times Moors, English and French, but then they made the on the beach of the castle, two forts with 14 pieces and before it another, with a few; in the town, two forts with artillery;...but immediately, an artillery captain with 30 artillerymen, in addition to the Captain-major, officials and ordinance people...".

Figueiredo (1960) referred to the bay of Praia and its fortifications in 1815:

"The Bay of Praia with a large areal of white sand, drains the Ravine of Gatos and of Praia, that has its four watermills, and three castles that were mentioned". "The Castle of São João Baptista in the site of Praia, with seven pieces, of which two are 12-calibre bronze and one lead 24-calibre canon and three of 7-calibre, but all in ruined condition".

The "Relação" by Field Marshal Baron of Bastos, in 1862, informed the Crown, that the castle : "has a high barracks and a kitchen" and that it was in a state of ruin.

By the end of the 20th century, there still existed two artillery pieces on the abandoned battlements, alongside the ruin structure (which since disappeared). A later periodical indicated: "The Câmara Municipal de Vila do Porto will proceed with the removal of the two, old pieces that exist in the abandoned small castle of Praia. Once they are recuperated, this pieces will be ceded to the Museum of Santo Espírito to be publicly exhibited." Yet, there are no proofs that the pieces finally made it to the museum. In fact, there is speculation that any of those artillery-pieces may have joined the group in the Fort of São Brás in Vila do Porto.

Ferreira (1997) registered the state of ruin of the fort, of what he defined as a 16th-century fort. Technical studies were made at the site, in order to recuperate the structure, by then in an advance stage of degradation and which was not registered for protection or classification.

The grounds of the fort were used as a secondary stage (Palco Oportunidades – DRJ), during the 23rd Annual Festival Maré de Agosto in 2007.

Between 27 and 28 September 2011, a storm with winds exceeding 85 kilometres per hour (53 mph), heavy rainfall and waves affected the southern coast of the island), resulting in landslides that influenced the ruined structure, alongside the ravine. Consequently, the remaining portions of the structure continued to deteriorate.
