= Almagreira (Vila do Porto) =

- Civil parish
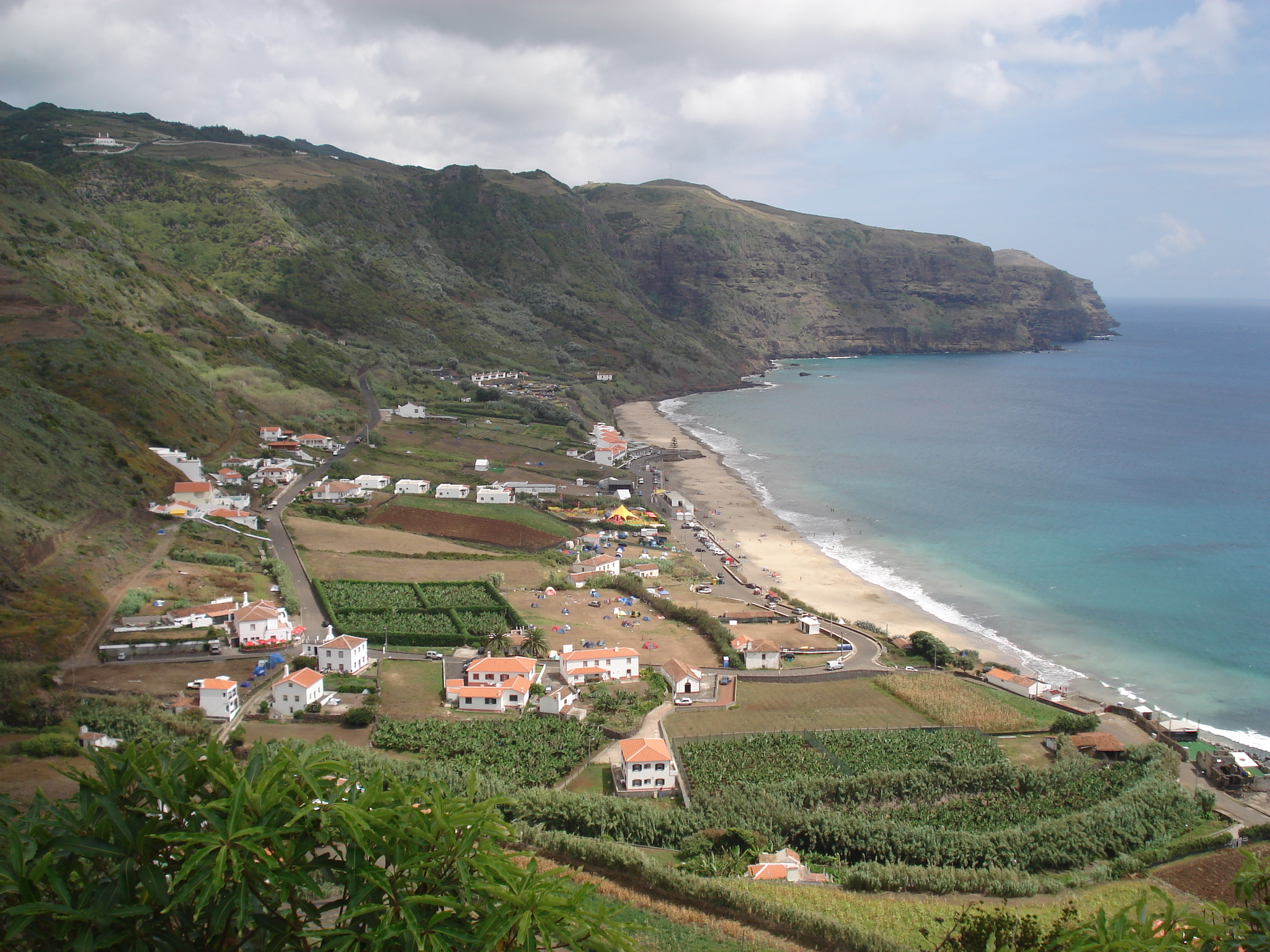
- The village of Praia Formoso, on the southern coast of Almagreira; a resort and tourist center during the summer, attractive for its long white sand beach

- Location of the parish of Almagreira within the municipality of Vila do Porto
- Coordinates: 36°57′57″N 25°6′24″W
- Country: Portugal
- Auton. region: Azores
- Island: Santa Maria
- Municipality: Vila do Porto

Area
  - Total: 11.22 km^{2} (4.33 sq mi)
- Elevation: 189 m (620 ft)

Population (2011)
  - Total: 599
  - Density: 53.4/km^{2} (138/sq mi)
- Time zone: UTC−01:00 (AZOT)
  - Summer (DST): UTC+00:00 (AZOST)
- Postal code: 9580-014
- Area code: 292
- Patron: Nossa Senhora do Bom Despacho

Almagreira (Portuguese pronunciation: [almɐˈɣɾɐjɾɐ]) is a civil parish in the municipality of Vila do Porto on the island of Santa Maria, in the Portuguese autonomous region of Azores. The population in 2011 was 599, in an area of 11.22 km^{2}. Bordering all other parishes of the island, it is located northwest of Vila do Porto.

== History ==
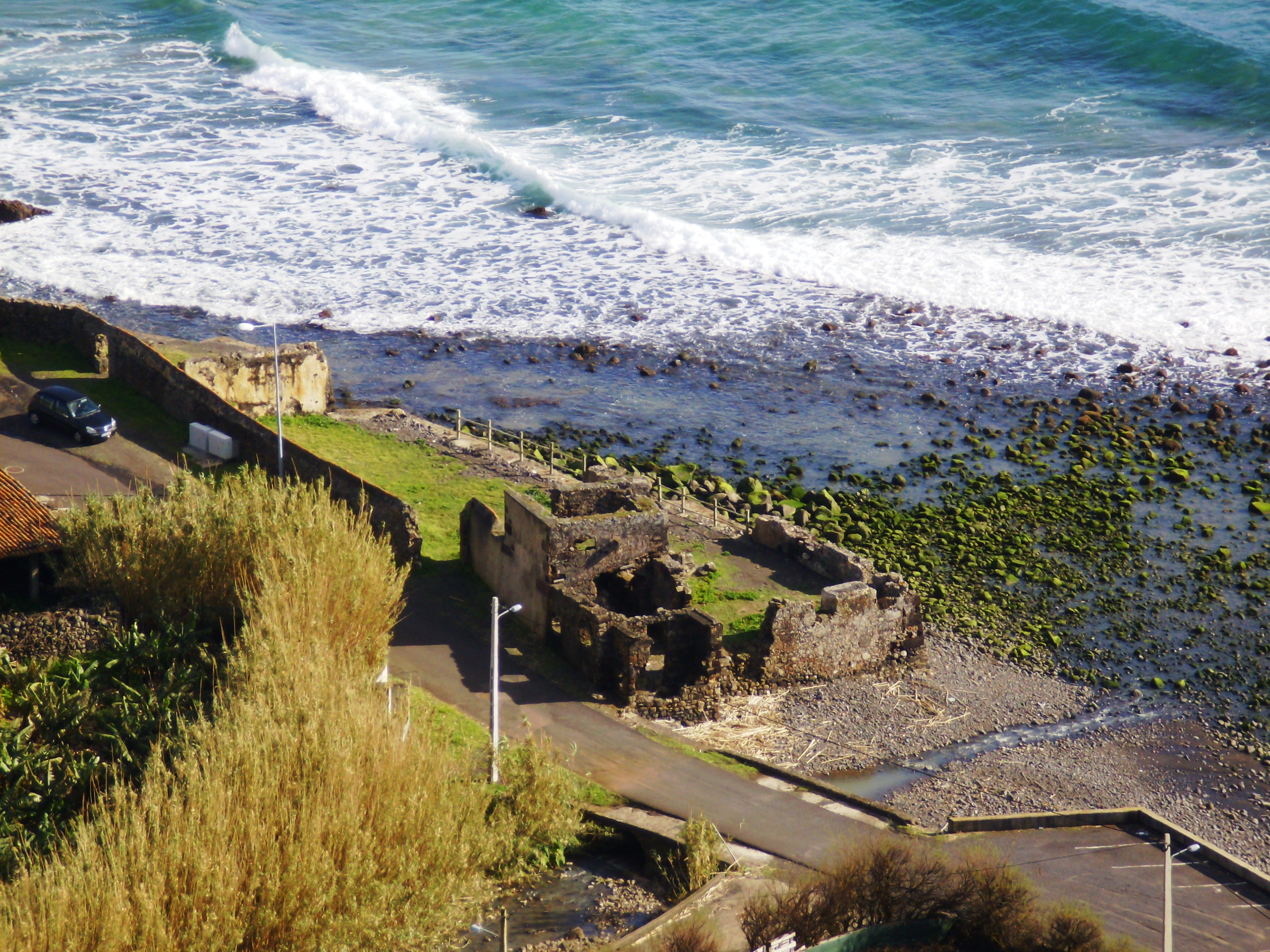
The partial ruins of the Fort of São João Baptista, at the mouth of the main ravine, as seen from the Macela Belvedre

It is unclear when this area was first referred to as Almagreira, but it stemmed from the exploration of a type of clay common in the area; from the name almagre, for a lead-rich red clay, used for pigment. The importance of this clay was later mentioned in a local poem:

"It was the clay of Almagreira/that moulded our luck/this sailor's luck/Between the ocean and the north wind"

The beachhead, today Praia Formosa, was first referred to in the Castilian Açores Insulae map, authored by Luís Teixeira and dated to 1584, as the Plaia Hermosa. The same author, in his map Descripçam da Ilha de Santa Maria, in 1587 (today located in the Biblioteca Nazionale Centrale de Florença), referred to the area of Almagreira as the Parish of Figueira (Portuguese: Paróquia da Figueira)”, noting the ancient hermitage dedicated to Nossa Senhora dos Remédios, and a small population of 40 neighbours, in addition to the aforementioned Praia Fremosa.

In addition to the Chapel of Nossa Senhora dos Remédios (Our Lady of Medicine), the parish is also the location of several other temples: Church of Nossa Senhora do Bom Despacho (Our Lady of Good Tidings), which evolved from a small chapel constructed in the 18th century, as well as the Church of Nossa Senhora do Monte (Our Lady of the Mount) and Nossa Senhora da Graça (Our Lady of Grace), both constructed in the 19th century.

It was in Porto Formosa that English (1599) and later Barbary coast pirates (June 1616) first attacked the island. The second assault, which was the most calamitous and damaging, resulted in islanders soliciting (formally, since about 1599) provisions for the islands defence.

There are also vestiges of a 16th–17th century Fort of São João Baptista that was used to protect the location from pirate attacks.

The bishop of the Diocese of Angra, António Caetano da Rocha, on 2 December 1766 created a new parish, "...the third of the main Church to benefit that people and most populous parish that reside in that par of the mountains". It was during the 19th century, that thee twelfth Commander in the Order of Christ on Santa Maria, Diogo José Ferreira de Eça e Menezes, third Count of Lousã, who organized the collection of funds to support the creation of a specific Curato Sufragâneo da Matriz na Almagreira (clergy) to reside at the Church of Bom Despacho.

The lands of the northern plateau of the parish were recorded as the most productive on the island, with extensive fields that produced wheat; Lieutenant-Colonel José Carlos Figueiredo, writing in 1815, while in service on the island noted: "...site of the best lands, in squared fields and a good plain of orchards...". The first primary school began offering classes in 1864. The ex-Constitution, Canarias, known locally as the sunken boat, was a Spanish-registered ship, which, on 13 November 1871, sunk in Praia Bay.

The civil parish, owing to the dramatic growth, separated from the parish of Nossa Senhora de Assunção (Vila do Porto) by decree on 25 October 1906, an area that included the communities of Bom Despacho Velho, Brasil, Brejo de Baixo, Brejo de Cima, Brejo do Meio, Carreira, congro, Courelas, Covas, Farropo, Fonte do Mourato, Fonte Nova, Graça and Praia. Much later, a Casa do Povo (community centre) was founded on 6 October 1966, but electricity only reached the parish in August 1971. At the time, its population has sustained itself on agriculture, woven handicrafts, woollen sweaters and bedspreads.

== Geography ==
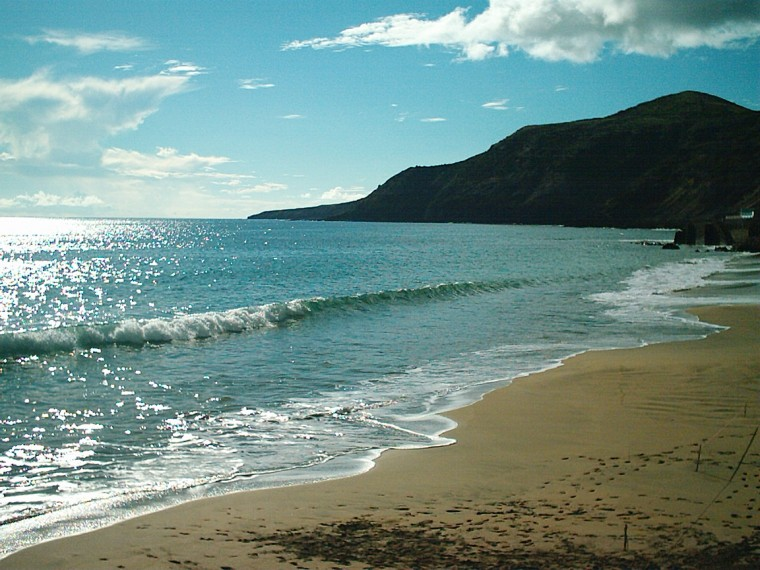
The unique white sand beaches of Praia Formosa, created from alluvial runoff, and extending along the southern coast

Almagreira is situated in the central southern coast of the island of Santa Maria, limited on the east by the Ribeira do Gato, north-east the regional road dissecting the watersheds of the Ribeira da Praia/Farropo and Ribeira do Salto, north and north-west by the Ribeira de João, Ribeira das Covas and on the west by an escarpment between valley of Valverde and Figueiral. This parish is found within a transitional band from the higher altitude, rugged relief on the eastern coast, and the planar landscape of the western half of the island. The eastern half of the parish is a mountainous zone covered in forests extending to Pico Alto (in the north) and towards Malbusca (in the southeast), passing through Pico das Cavacas (492 metres); it is an area cut by several ravines and substantial watershed on the island. The western portion of the parish extends to its border with Vila do Porto and São Pedro, along a semi-flat plateau broken by a few volcanic cones, such as Pico do Bom Despacho (294 metres) and Pico do Facho (254 metres). This flat plateau area is the broken by walled parcels of agricultural land from Fonte Nova until Touril and Figuerial, and includes large pasturelands in Brejo de Baixo, in an area known as Tremoçal. Tremoçal has been considered for the location of a new Golf Complex, that includes club house, housing and support structures, covering an area of 99.5 hectares of land. Meanwhile, the southern coast fronts a large bay, surrounded by basaltic and sedimentary cliffs (such as Touril or Macela) cut by ravines that disgorge into the ocean. The alluvial drainage from these ravines have, over the centuries, formed white-sand beaches (Praia Grande and Praia Pequeno) in Praia Formosa, which are atypical in the Azores.

Access to communities in Almagreira follow the Estrada Regional E.R. 1-2ª roadway that connects São Pedro and Vila do Porto in the northeast corner, through the built-up area of Almagreira proper, to the foothills around Bom Despacho Velho. This accessway, then intersects in the mountains of Pico Alto, around Cruz dos Picos, before continuing to the border of Espírito Santo (in the eastern border), around Fontinhas. This main road only traverses the northern part of the parish: ancillary roads in Brejo do Baixo and Barreiros connect the isolated coastal village of Praia Formosa, winding down the coastal cliffs of Macela, intersecting Ribeira da Praia and Ribeira do Farropo, before reaching the sea level and then climbing to Barreiros.

The parish includes the following localities: Almagreira, Bom Despacho Velho, Brejo de Baixo, Brejo de Cima, Carreira, Falcão, Fonte Nova, Praia Formoso, Outeiro and Rua do Congro. Since 1911, the population had progressively grown, until 1960, when it began a steady decline. By 1991, the population of Almagreira was equivalent to 38% of the resident population in 1960. As with many of the islands of the archipelago, emigration was the principal cause of this depopulation.

== Economy ==
Over the years, the local population has occupied itself traditionally with activities associated with agriculture and cattle-raising (primarily dairy), in addition to artesian handicrafts (works of wicker, wool or produced from loom), as well as regional sweets (such as biscoitos de orelha, cavacas or búzios). As tourism began to permeate the economy of the islands of the Azores, Almagreira was located in a convenient location: the white sand beaches along its southern margins are unique in the archipelago. Consequently, due to its warm summers, and normally placid oceanfront bay, the community attracts tourists from within and outside the Azores.

== Architecture ==
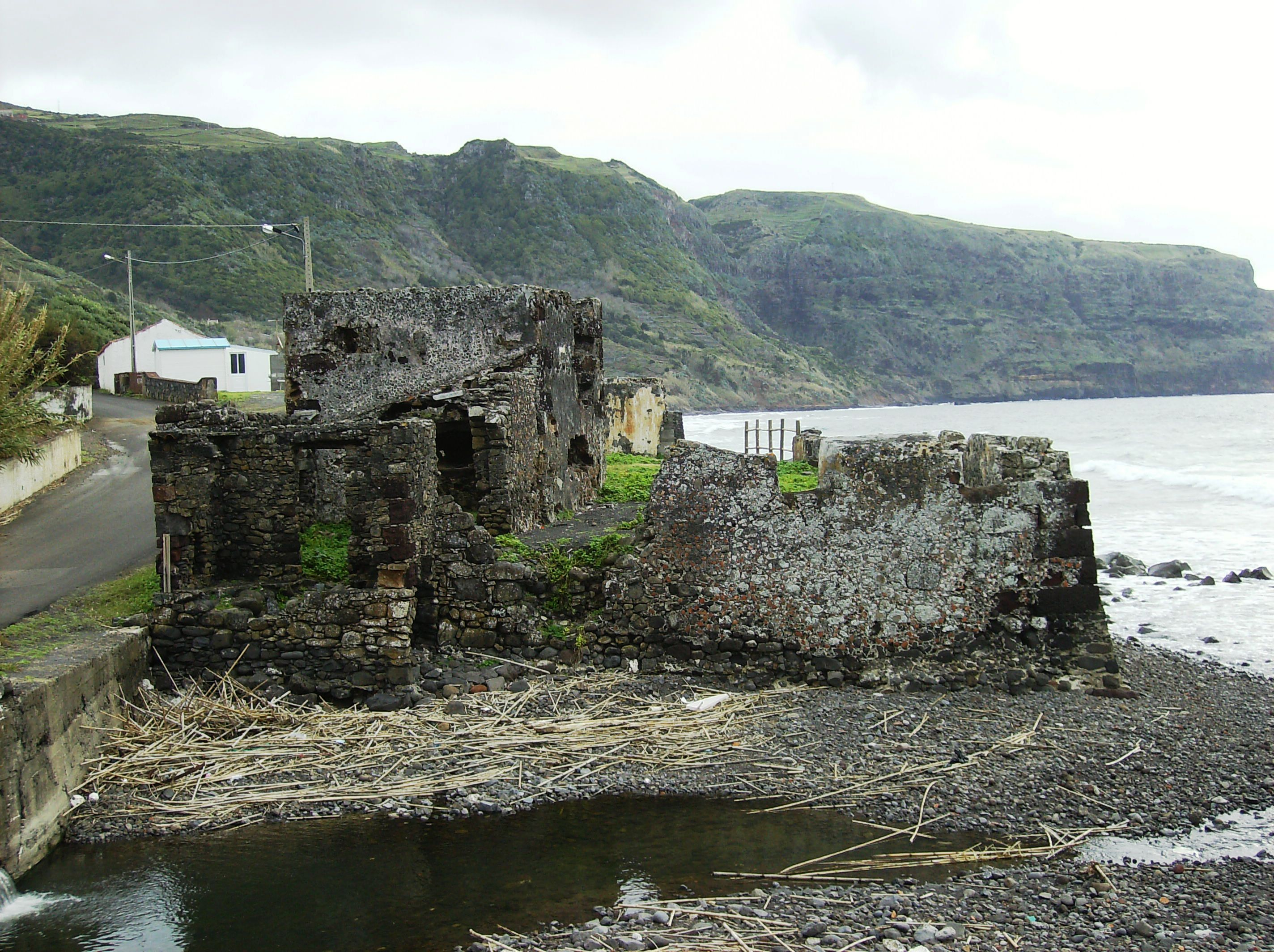
The remains of the Fort of São João Baptista

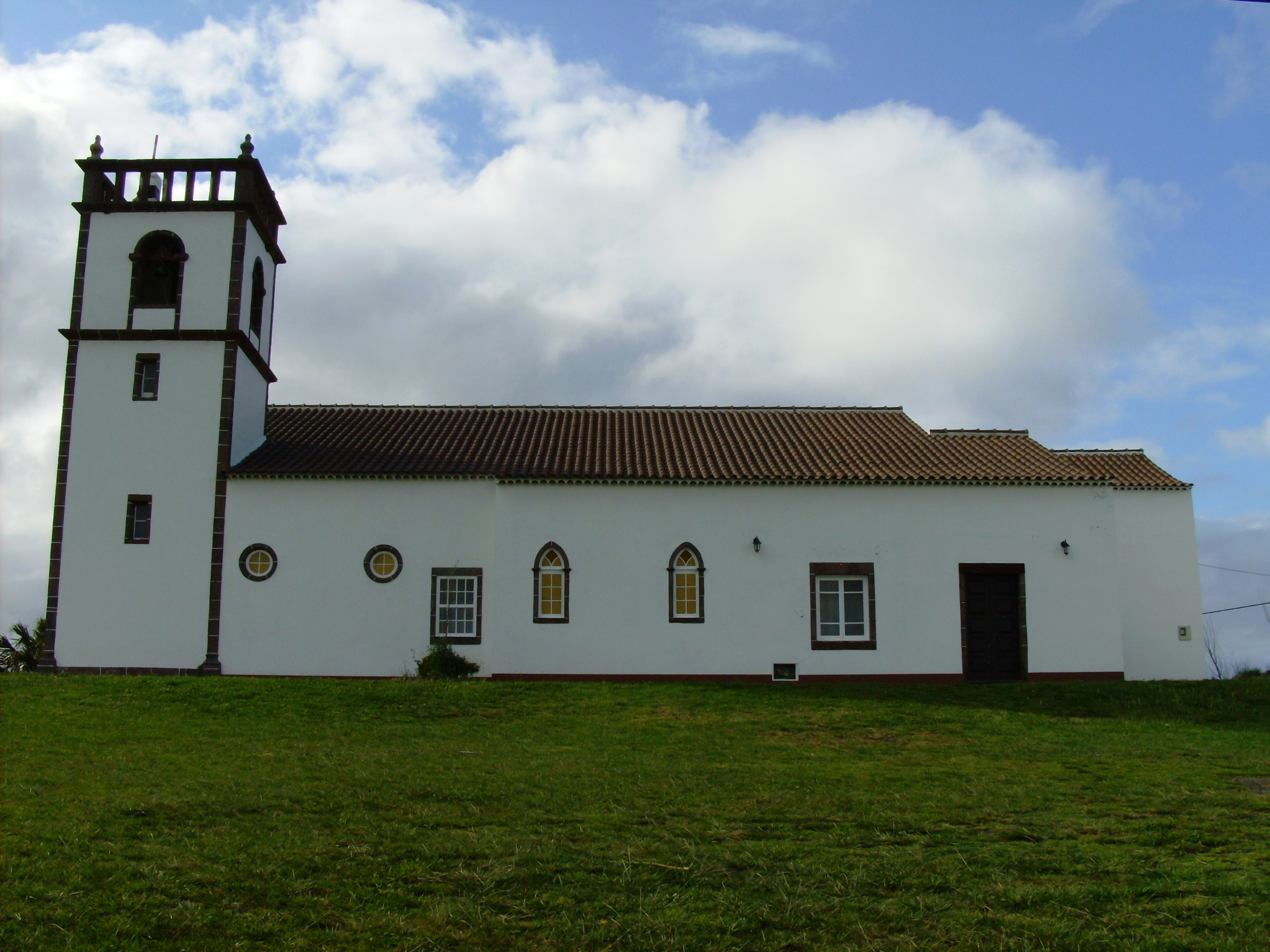
The profile of the Church of Nossa Senhora de Bom Despacho

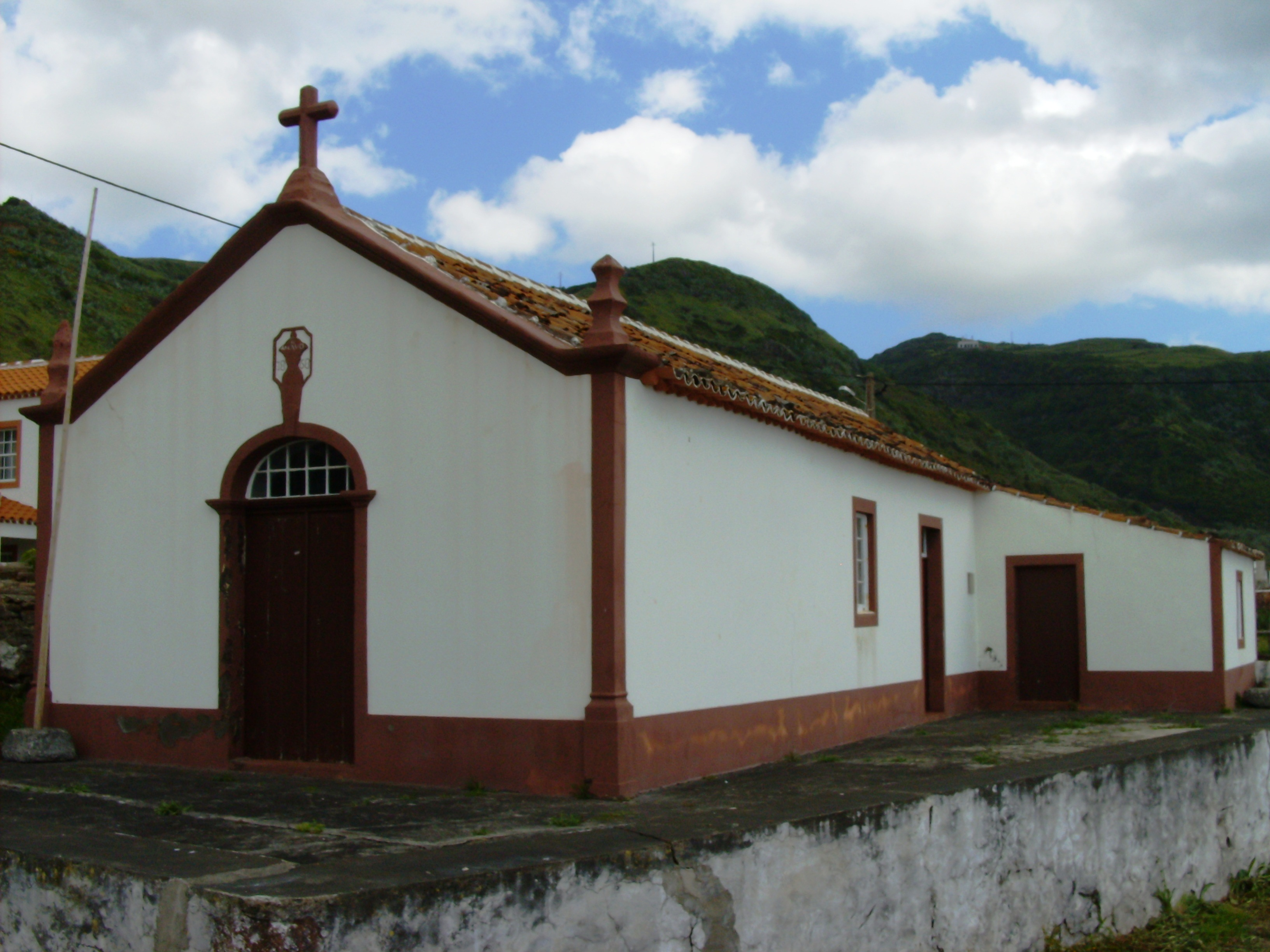
The small Hermitage of Nossa Senhora dos Remédios

=== Civic ===
- Quicklime Oven (Portuguese: Forno do Cal), one of the older remnants of early settlers, the ruins of this cylindrical barrel-vault blast-oven are found in the area around Touril, in the south-west corner of Almagreira, on the plateau near Pico do Facho. Constructed of masonry bricks, the exposed oven was used in the production of lime until the late 19th century, along with other ruins used in its support.
- Estate of Falcão (Portuguese: Quinta do Falcão), a large tract of land near the edge of Almagreira's western border, which was once the residence of magistrate/judge Falcão, who was one of the politico-administrative leaders of the early settlement of Vila do Porto. The estate is made of the red-brick masonry typical of the region; the complex consists of a residence, stables, agricultural annexes, cistern and overlook, accessible from the main road by a grand portico in a neoclassical design that includes a long entrance corridor to the main house.
- Estate of the Arrudas (Portuguese: Quinta dos Arruda), consisting of main residence, two agricultural buildings (with stables and cistern), pig corrals, wall and formal garden, as well as fields constructed in 1871 for the Arruda family, but all currently in a state of ruin.
- Estate/Hermitage of Santa Rita (Portuguese: Solar e Ermida de Santa Rita), located off the junction between the Estrada Regional and access road to Valverde, the chapel is a rectangular construction appended to the former residence of a nobleman, designed with a decorative archway and entrance, but simply constructed from masonry brick.

=== Military ===
- Fort of São João Baptista of Praia Formosa (Portuguese: São João Baptista da Praia Formosa), also referred to one time as the Castle of São João Baptista, its ruins are located in the southwest corner of the beach in Praia Formosa; a small fort, it is constituted by platform of bastions, partially walled and garrisoned, but now limited along the beach by the access roadway, its walls are the only remnants that have survived weathering from ocean storms.

=== Religious ===
- Chapel of Nossa Senhora do Monte (Portuguese: Capela de Nossa Senhora do Monte), dedicated to Our Lady of the Mount, part of a rural residencia (consisting of house, chapel, secretary, still, cistern, outhouse and pig pen) in the locality of Meia Laranja, and constructed in the 19th century; the chapel was built in 1819, to the rear of the residence, divided by a knee-high wall, and appended to the building, completed with sculpted cornices, that are likewise repeated in the entrance portico at the roadside.
- Hermitage of Nossa Senhora da Graça (Portuguese: Capela de Nossa Snehora da Graça), located in the locality of Graça, the small hermitage is dedicated to Our Lady of Grace;
- Church of Nossa Senhora do Bom Despacho (Portuguese: Igreja Paroquial de Almagreira/Igreja de Nossa Senhora do Bom Despacho), the parochial church of Almagreira, dedicated to Our Lady of Good Tidings is located on the plateau overlooking the coast of the parish, constructed by Manuel de Moura and his wife, Inês Pereira, in the early 18th century
- Hermitage of Nossa Senhora dos Remédios (Portuguese: Ermida de Nossa Senhora dos Remédios/Ermida de Santo Amaro), dedicated to Our Lady of Medicine, the chapel is located in southern coastal place of Praia Formosa, alongside the Ribeira da Praia, it is a simple rectangular temple with small sacristy, a decorative archway door (inscribed with the words "1868/S AMARO", when it was then known as the Chapel of São Amaro) and constructed masrony brickwork later painted white. Along with the sacristy, the single nave chapel has a well-preserved pulpit of wood, with elements designed in the Baroque style (principally spiral rosettas).
