= Church of Nossa Senhora do Bom Despacho =

- Church of Our Lady of Good Tidings
- Igreja de Nossa Senhora do Bom Despacho
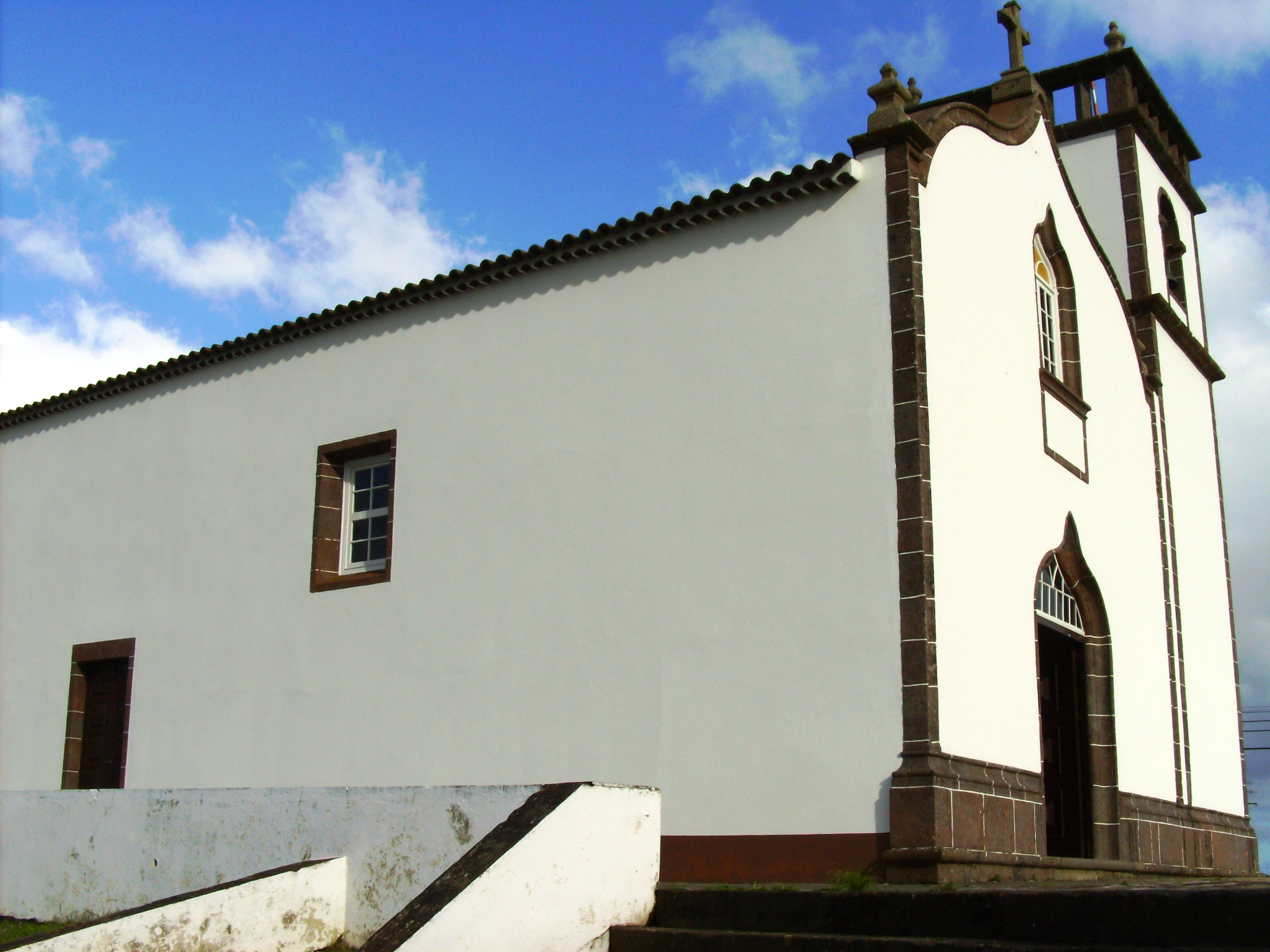
- The lateral facade of the parochial church as seen from the Estrada Regional roadway in Brejo

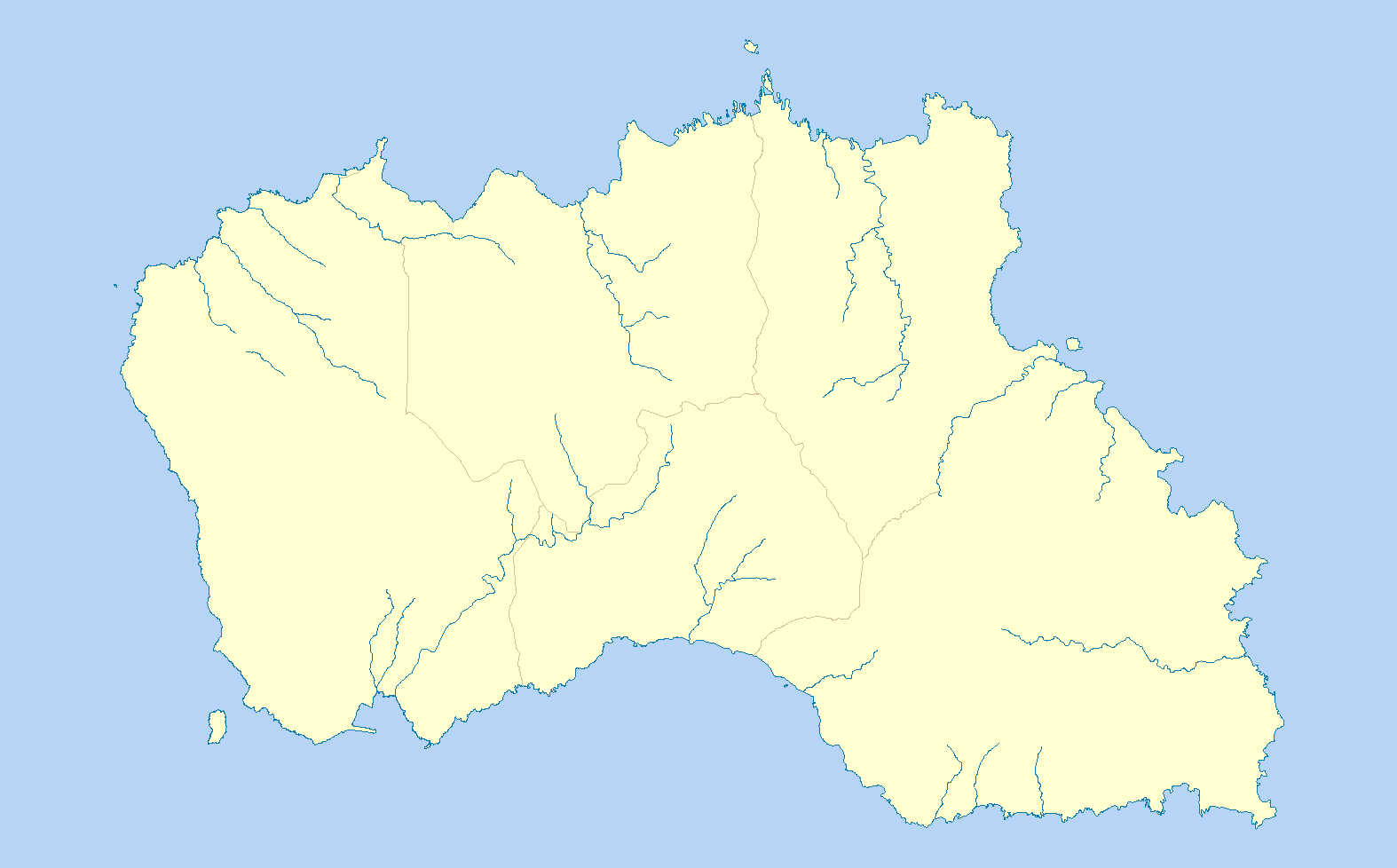
- Location of the church within the municipality of Vila do Porto
- 36°57′57.86″N 25°6′29.02″W
- Location: Santa Maria, Eastern, Azores
- Country: Portugal

History
- Founded: 11 June 1702

Architecture
- Style: Medieval

Specifications
- Length: 26.25 m (86.1 ft)
- Width: 10 m (33 ft)

The Church of Nossa Senhora do Bom Despacho (Portuguese: Igreja Paroquial de Almagreira/Igreja de Nossa Senhora do Bom Despacho) is the parochial church of the civil parish of Almagreira, located in the municipality of Vila do Porto, Portuguese archipelago of the Azores. It is a church of masonry, plastered and painted, constructed with decorative pilasters, friezes and cornices, molds and corner pinnacles, with a carved retable and tile covering.

== History ==
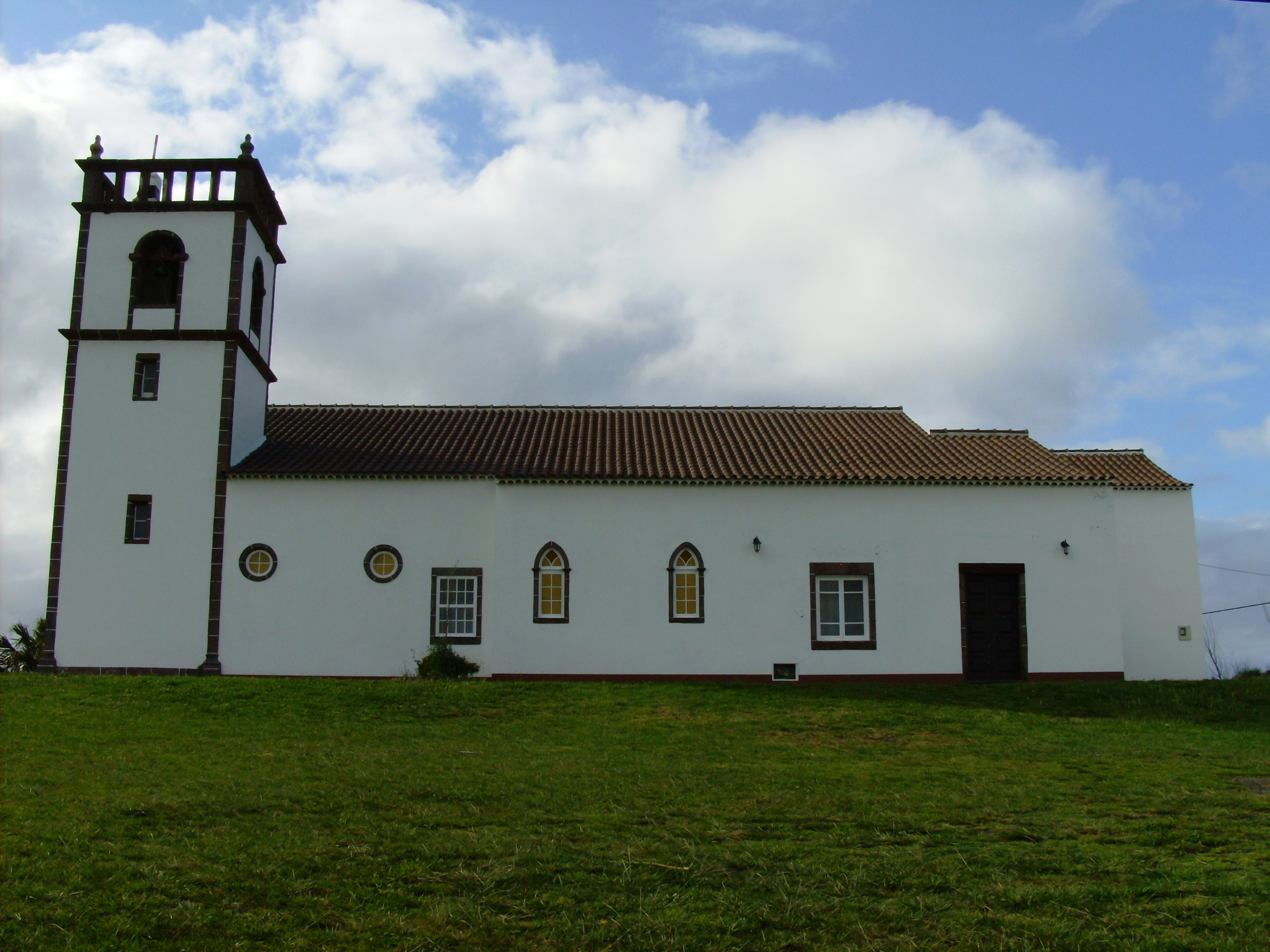
The lateral right facade as seen from the pastures of Brejo de Cima

On 11 June 1702, a deed was signed for the construction of the chapel that would become this church, by Manuel de Moura and his wife Inês Pereira, under the invocation of Nossa Senhora do Bom Despacho.

It would be several years before the Bishop of Angra, D. António Caetano Rocha, would authorize the establishment of a curate for the religious community. This curate, founded on 2 December 1766, would become the third for the parochial church, which would have an important benefit for the peoples and parishioners that lived in the plateau of central Santa Maria.

Sometime during the 19th century, the chapel was adapted and expanded, transforming itself into a major church. Around the same time, specifically 12 May 1859, work began on lands donated by João Severino Gago da Câmara. The first mass at the re-consecrated church occurred on 27 November 1859.

On 25 October 1906, a formal decree separated the curate of Almagreira from those of the neighboring parish of Nossa Senhora de Assunção (in Vila do Porto), resulting in the independence of the ecclesiastical parish.

In 2005, public works to restore the church were undertaken, with European community funds estimated at 70,000 Euros. Two years later the image of the patron saint also benefited from work intended to clean and conserve the statue.

== Architecture ==
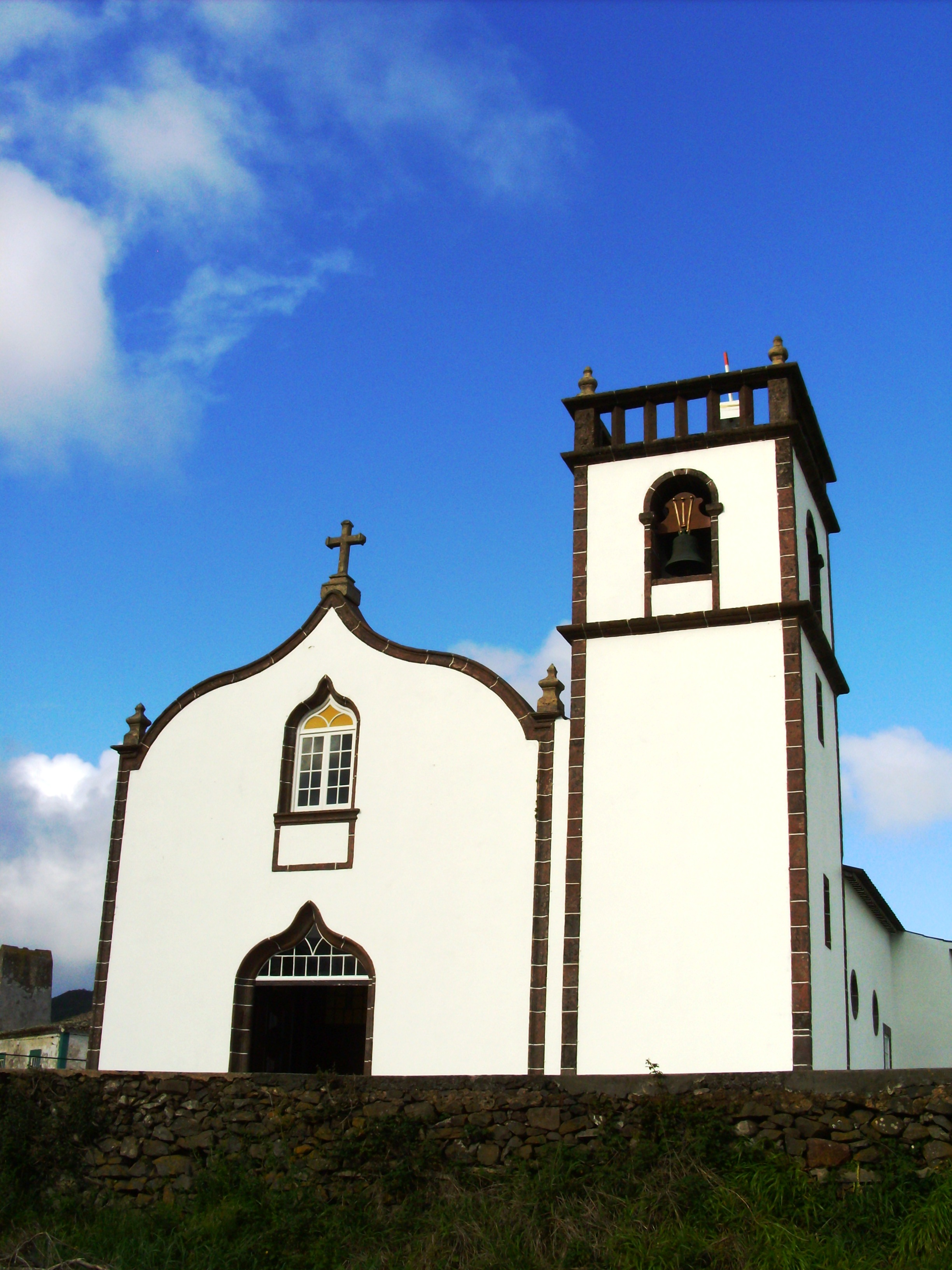
The imposing two-story church, as seen from the staircase leading from the roadway in Brejo

A single longitudinal nave church with presbytery, with a rectangular bell-tower situated on its right lateral wall, along with baptistery, lateral chapel and sacristy. The nave is divided into various volumes, and covered in tiled-roof.

The faces of the building are plastered and painted in white, with pilaster corners, crowned by pinnacles and circled by balustrades. The principal facade is terminated by a contoured frontispiece and crowned by cross. The front portico continues the contoured motif: not just on the doorway, but also on the overhead window, decorated with a contoured sill.

The left lateral facade is marked by a doorway and several windows, including two oculi, two gothic-style and two-squared windows.

The interior walls are plastered and painted, with triumphal archway dividing the two chancel and nave. At the front entrance is the second-floor high-choir guarded by balustrades, with a lateral baptistery and chapel. The main altar is constructed in varnished wood.
