= Recreational Forest Reserve of Fontinhas =

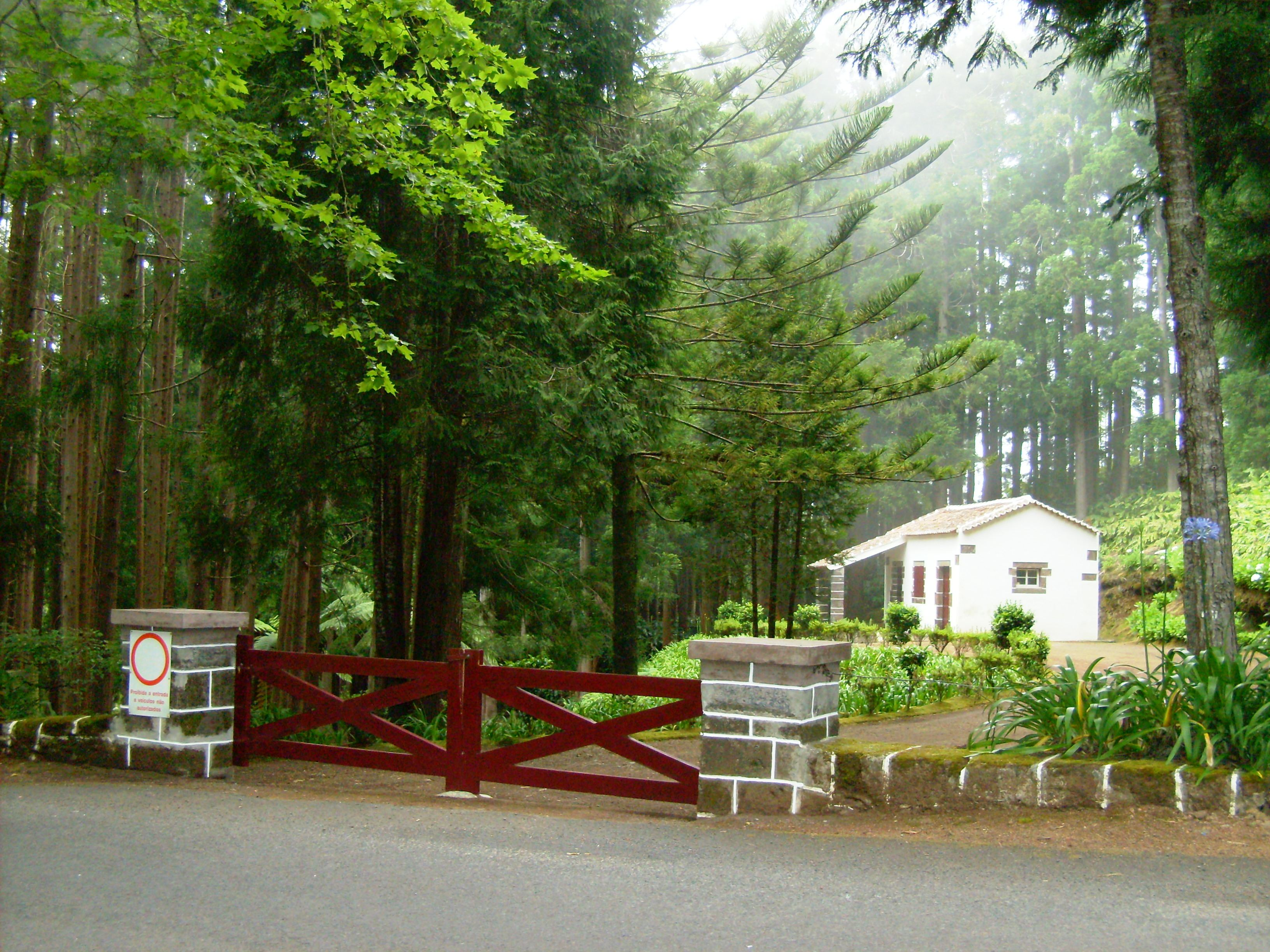
- Utility buildings in the Nature Reserve

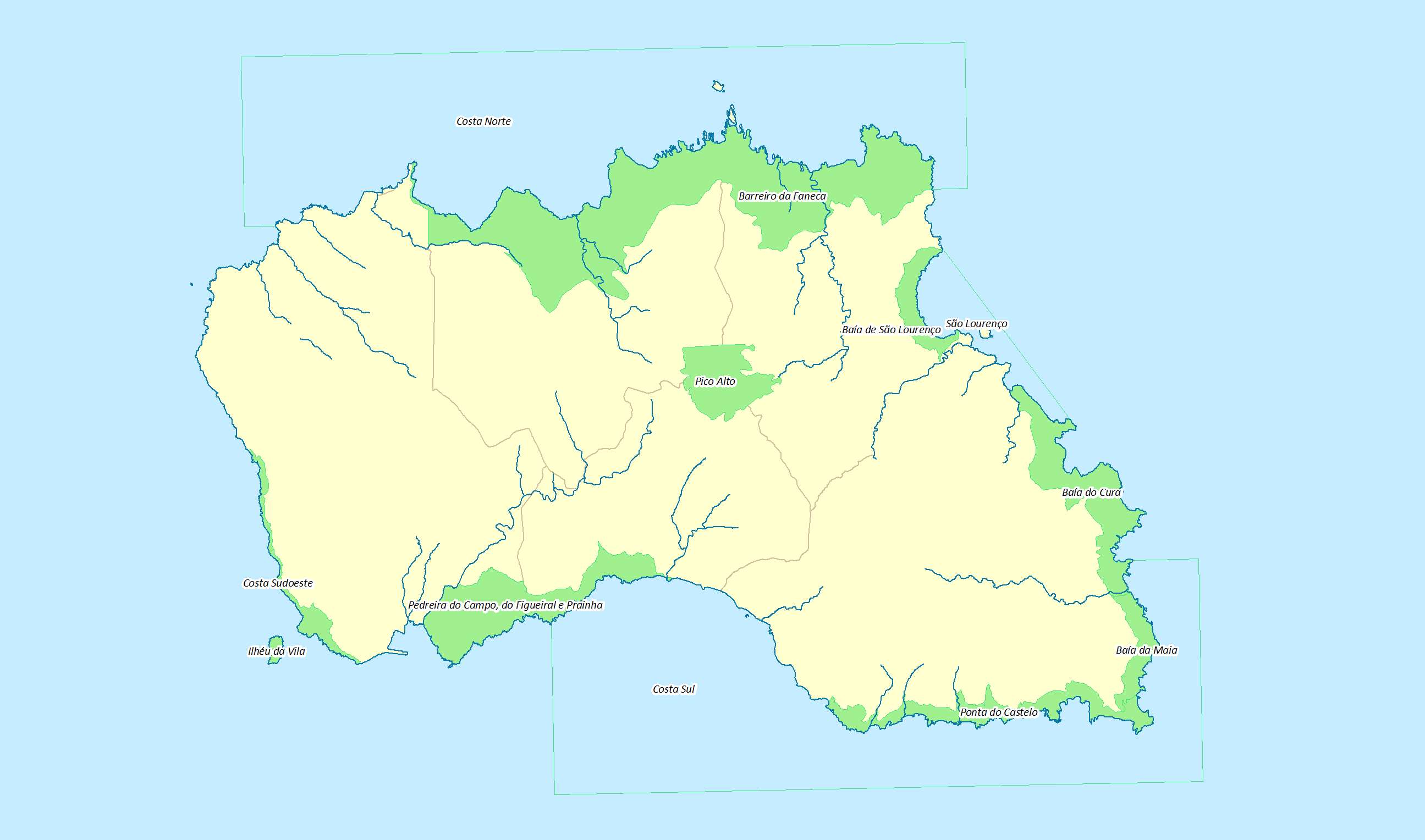
- Location within Nature Park of Santa Maria
- Location: Santa Maria, Eastern Group, Azores, Portugal
- Coordinates: 36°57′40″N 25°4′27″W
- Area: 3 ha (7.4 acres)
- Elevation: 420 m (1,380 ft)
- Established: 1989
- Visitors: Open from 1 June to 30 September, 9 AM to 7 PM
- Operator: Secretário Regional do Ambiente e do Mar
- Geographic detail from CAOP (2010) produced by Instituto Geográfico Português (IGP)

The Recreational Forest Reserve of Fontinhas (Portuguese: Reserva Florestal de Recreio de Fontinhas) is a recreational forest located centrally on the island of Santa Maria, in the civil parish of Santo Espírito, municipality of Vila do Porto in the Portuguese archipelago of the Azores.

== History ==
The Reserva Florestal de Recreio de Fontinhas was created by decree on August 30, 1989 (16/89/A) by the legislature of the Regional Government of the Azores. It is administered by the Secretaria Regional de Agricultura e Pescas (Regional Secretariat for Agriculture and Fishing), and run day-to-day by the Direcção Regional de Recursos Florestais (Regional Directorate of Forest Resources).

== Geography ==
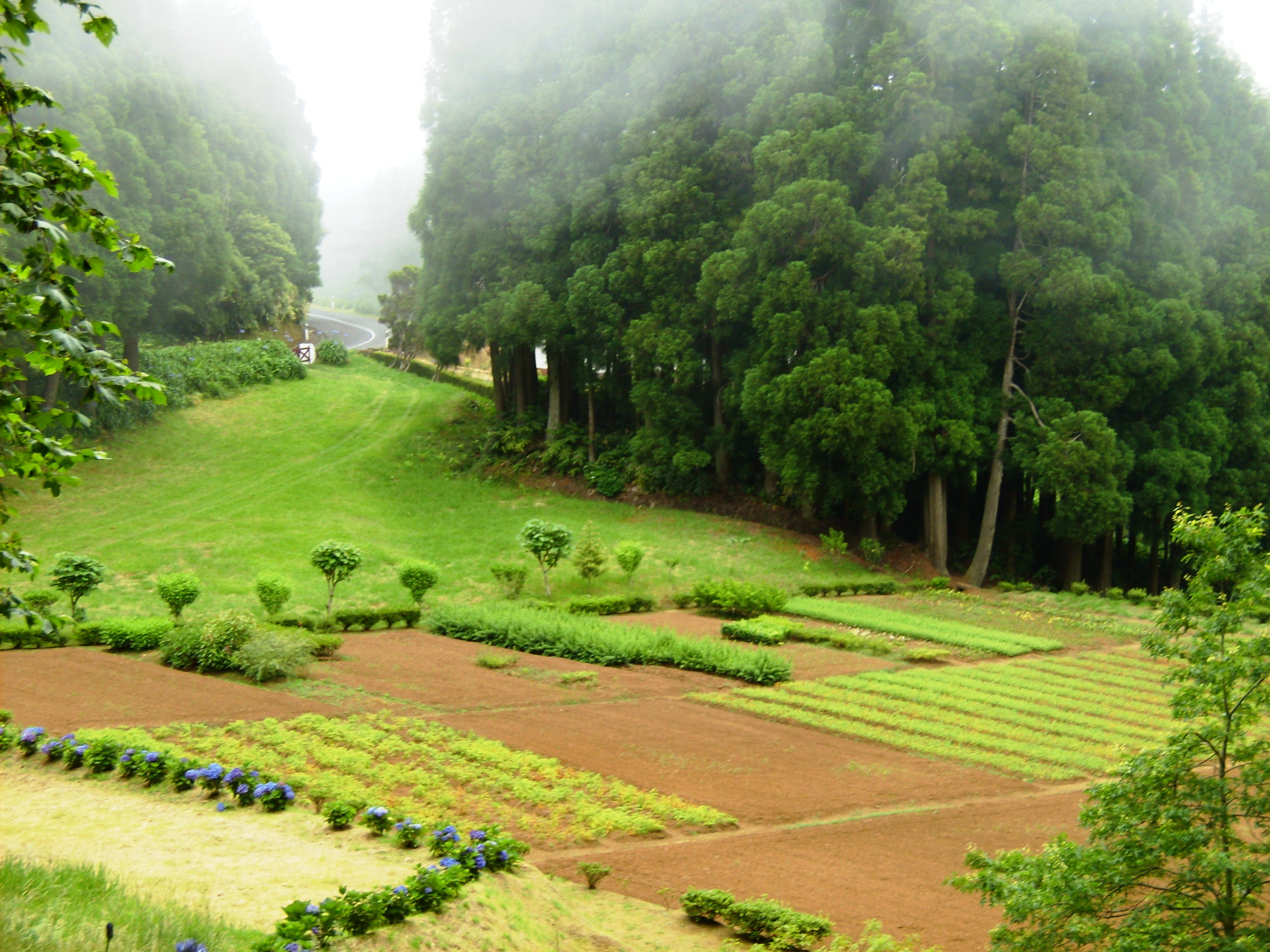
Manicured forest and grounds

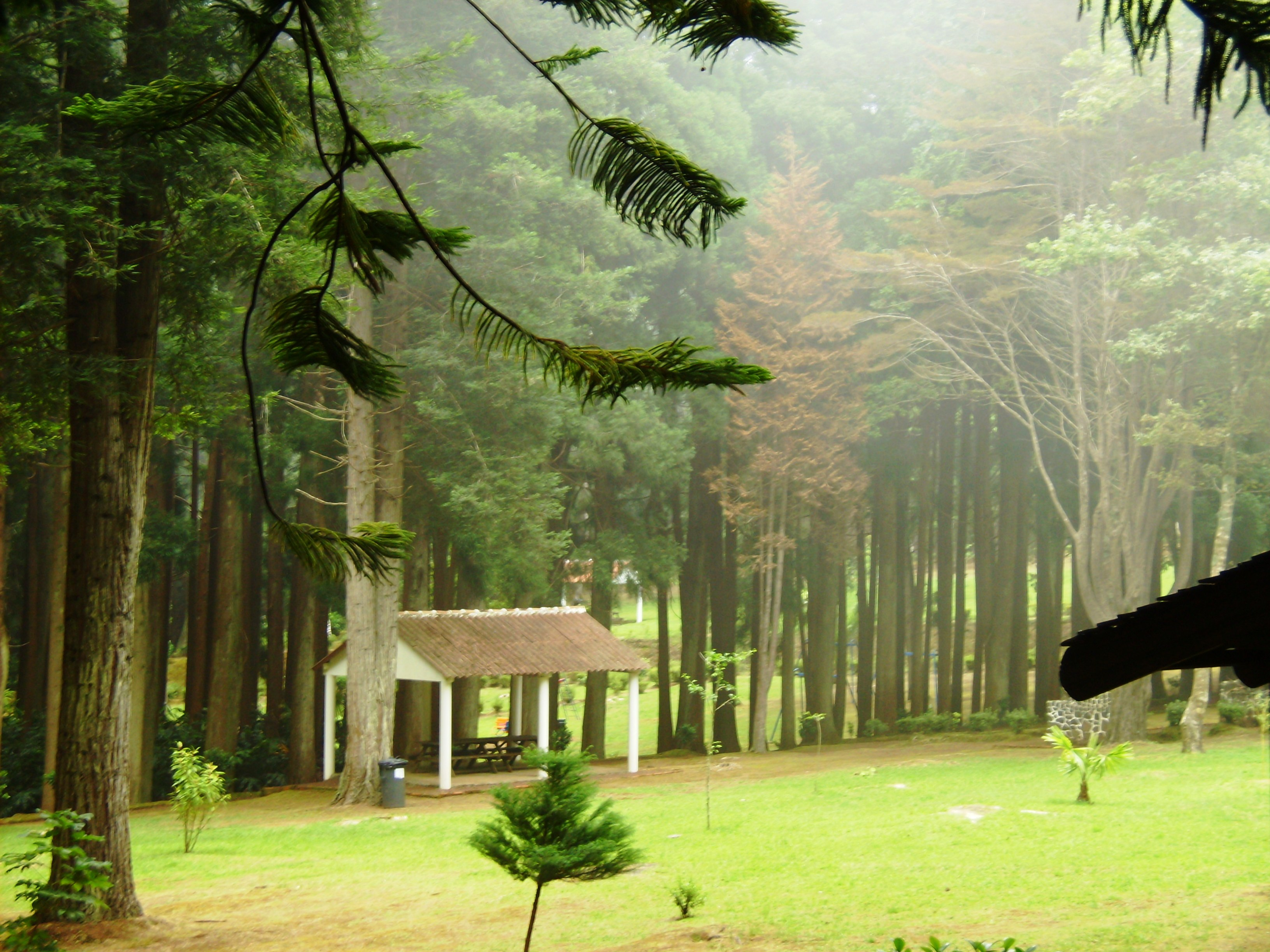
Barbecue and picnic areas

It is an area of about 3 hectares, at about 250 metres (820 ft) above sea level, and includes a section of forest and human spaces, operated by the Regional Government of the Azores. The area is situated on the western slope of the Pico Alto mountain in the middle of the island, which benefits from specific soils and climatic conditions, irrigated by natural springs and high humidity.

It is located adjacent to the island's main transversal motor route, the Estrada Regional E.R. 1-1º, that connects the town of Vila do Porto to the parishes of the eastern part of the island, and specifically Santo Espirito. It is limited to the north by the lands administered by the Directorate, to the east by the road of Água dos Mouros; to the south by the regional roadway and west by the forest nursery.

The nature reserve is a unit of multi-use in the Azores archipelago combining several activities; it is oriented towards human-nature interactivity, providing spaces for human leisure (barbecues, minor recreational activities, sightseeing and pedestrian trails) near to natural flora and fauna in the area. Central to this park is a large area of nurseries, in rectangular beds within a large glade bordered by a curtain of cryptomerias. There are several red clay pedestrian walking trails throughout the park with access to several infrastructures including barbecues, playgrounds, public washrooms, animal pens and lookouts.

The main feature of the park is its rich forest of tall species; a dense forest, its atmosphere populated by Japanese cedar, California redwood, Picconia azorica, local Azorean heather, its paths lined with Rhododendrons, tree ferns (Sphaeropteris cooperi), Agapanthus africanus and Japanese camellias. Trees are the primary coverage, especially the Cryptomeria, but also cedars, oaks and maple species are common.

=== Climate ===
Fontinhas has an oceanic climate with warm summers and mild, wet winters. Unlike the western area of the island, this region has significantly more precipitation and humidity due to orographic lift.

Climate data for Fontinhas, 1970-1990, altitude: 430 m (1,410 ft)
Month	Jan	Feb	Mar	Apr	May	Jun	Jul	Aug	Sep	Oct	Nov	Dec	Year
Record high °C (°F)	21.0 (69.8)	22.0 (71.6)	19.2 (66.6)	23.5 (74.3)	24.0 (75.2)	26.5 (79.7)	26.5 (79.7)	28.0 (82.4)	29.9 (85.8)	25.5 (77.9)	25.0 (77.0)	21.6 (70.9)	29.9 (85.8)
Mean daily maximum °C (°F)	13.9 (57.0)	13.6 (56.5)	14.0 (57.2)	14.9 (58.8)	16.3 (61.3)	18.5 (65.3)	20.8 (69.4)	21.8 (71.2)	21.0 (69.8)	18.8 (65.8)	16.3 (61.3)	14.8 (58.6)	17.1 (62.7)
Daily mean °C (°F)	11.7 (53.1)	11.2 (52.2)	11.6 (52.9)	12.2 (54.0)	13.6 (56.5)	15.6 (60.1)	17.8 (64.0)	19.0 (66.2)	18.3 (64.9)	16.3 (61.3)	13.9 (57.0)	12.6 (54.7)	14.5 (58.1)
Mean daily minimum °C (°F)	9.5 (49.1)	8.9 (48.0)	9.1 (48.4)	9.5 (49.1)	10.9 (51.6)	12.8 (55.0)	14.9 (58.8)	16.1 (61.0)	15.6 (60.1)	13.8 (56.8)	11.5 (52.7)	10.3 (50.5)	11.9 (53.4)
Record low °C (°F)	3.5 (38.3)	3.9 (39.0)	3.2 (37.8)	3.4 (38.1)	5.0 (41.0)	6.0 (42.8)	9.0 (48.2)	10.0 (50.0)	10.0 (50.0)	6.5 (43.7)	5.0 (41.0)	4.5 (40.1)	3.2 (37.8)
Average rainfall mm (inches)	165.3 (6.51)	134.3 (5.29)	114.1 (4.49)	100.3 (3.95)	63.0 (2.48)	51.1 (2.01)	52.6 (2.07)	74.4 (2.93)	100.3 (3.95)	141.7 (5.58)	177.0 (6.97)	177.4 (6.98)	1,351.5 (53.21)
Average relative humidity (%)	91	91	90	89	87	88	87	87	88	89	91	89	89
Source: Instituto de Meteorologia
