= Santa Maria Island =

Island of the Azores, Portugal

Native name: Ilha de Santa Maria Nickname: The Sun Island
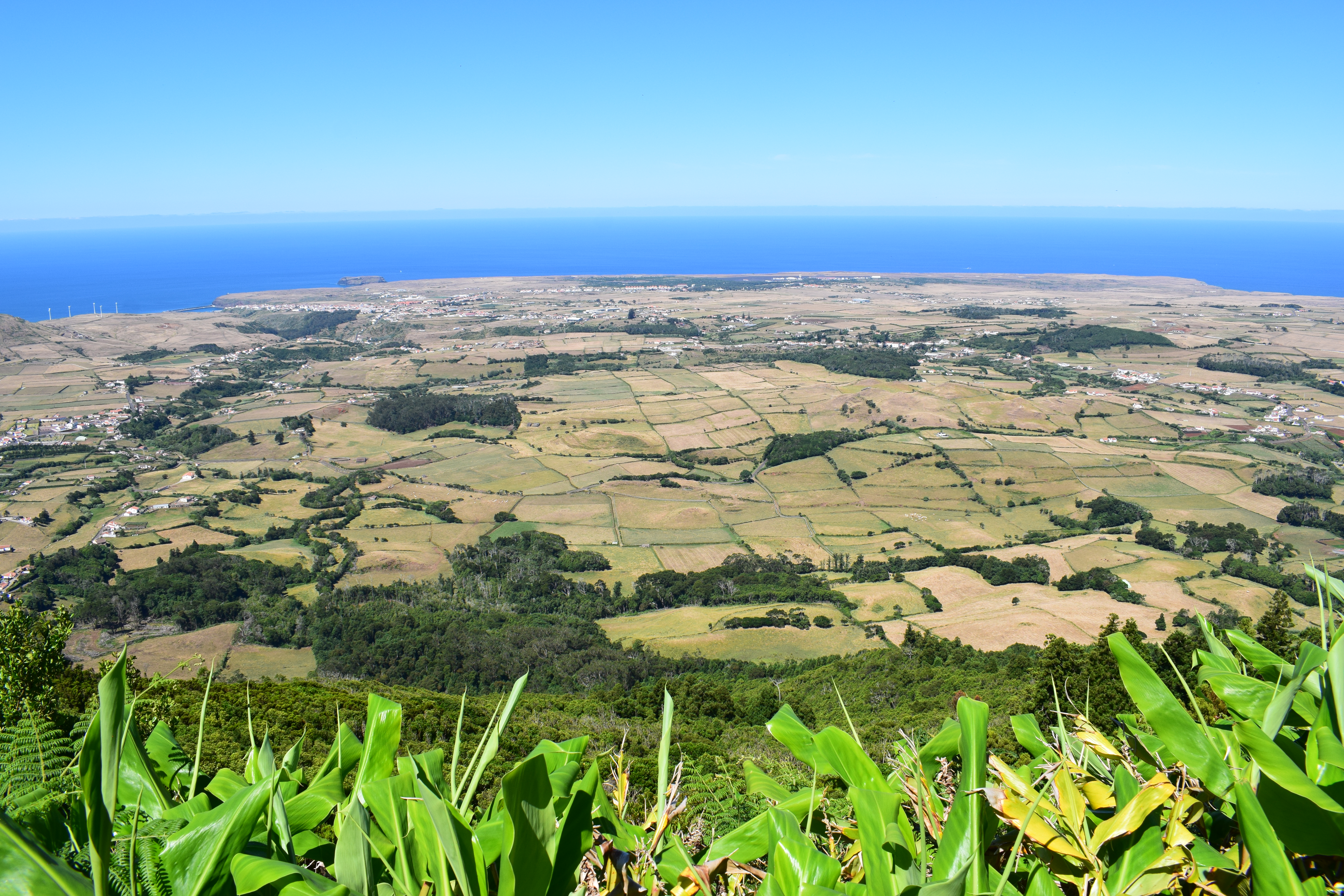
- The agricultural fields of the western portion of the island of Santa Maria, location of the main settlement, Vila do Porto (as seen from Pico Alto)

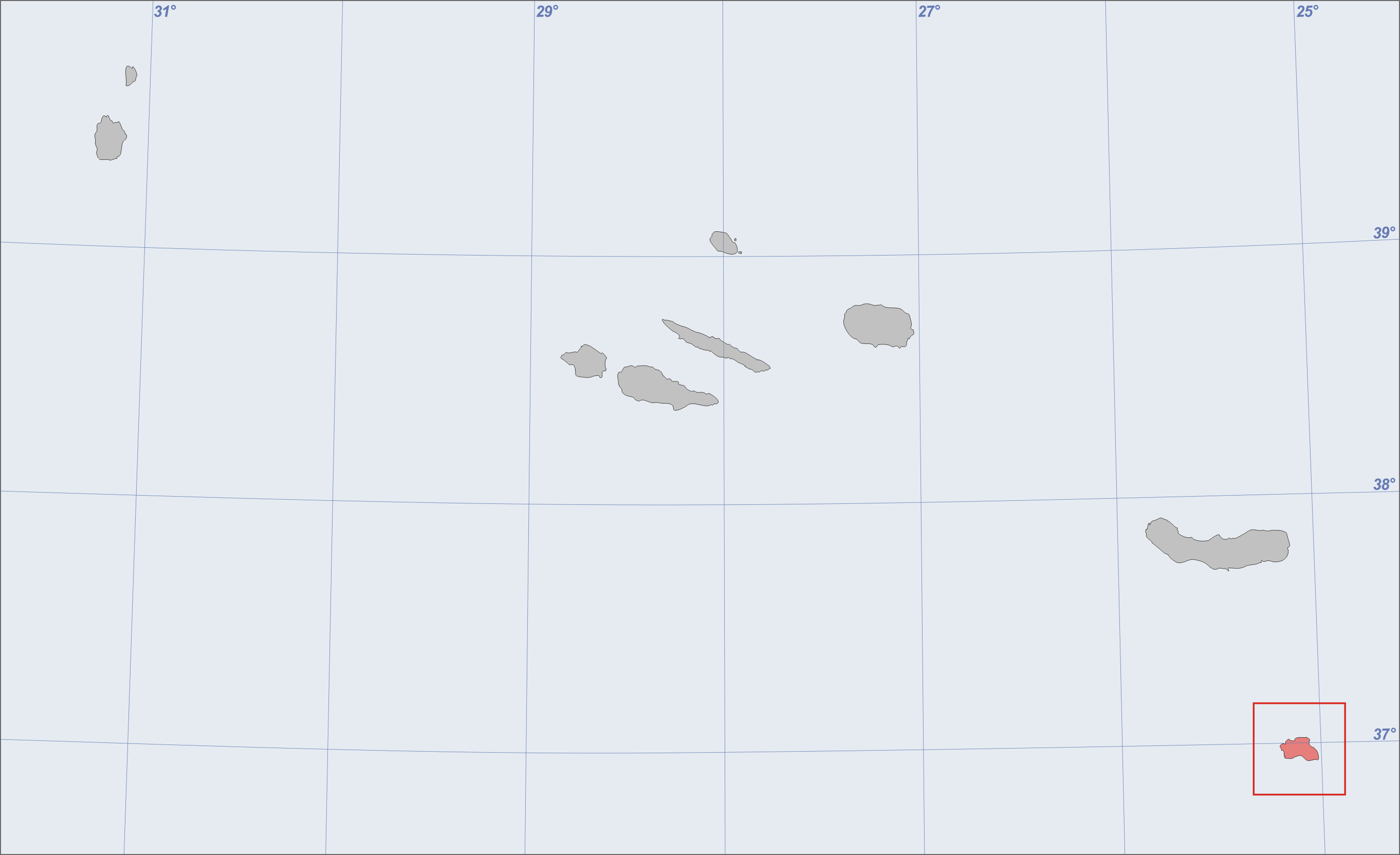
- Location of the island of Santa Maria in the archipelago of the Azores

Geography
- Location: Atlantic Ocean
- Coordinates: 36°58′29″N 25°05′41″W
- Archipelago: Azores
- Area: 96.87 km^{2} (37.40 sq mi)
- Coastline: 77.55 km (48.187 mi)
- Highest elevation: 586.8 m (1925.2 ft)
- Highest point: Pico Alto

Administration
- Portugal
- Autonomous Region: Azores
- Municipalities: Vila do Porto

Demographics
- Demonym: Mariense
- Population: ▼5,408 (2021)
- Pop. density: 56/km^{2} (145/sq mi)
- Languages: Portuguese
- Ethnic groups: Portuguese

Additional information
- Time zone: UTC−01:00

Santa Maria (Portuguese pronunciation: [ˈsɐ̃tɐ mɐˈɾi.ɐ]; Portuguese for 'Saint Mary') is an island in the eastern group of the Azores archipelago (south of the island of São Miguel) and the southernmost island in the Azores. The island is known for its white sand beaches, distinctive chimneys, and dry warm weather.

== History ==
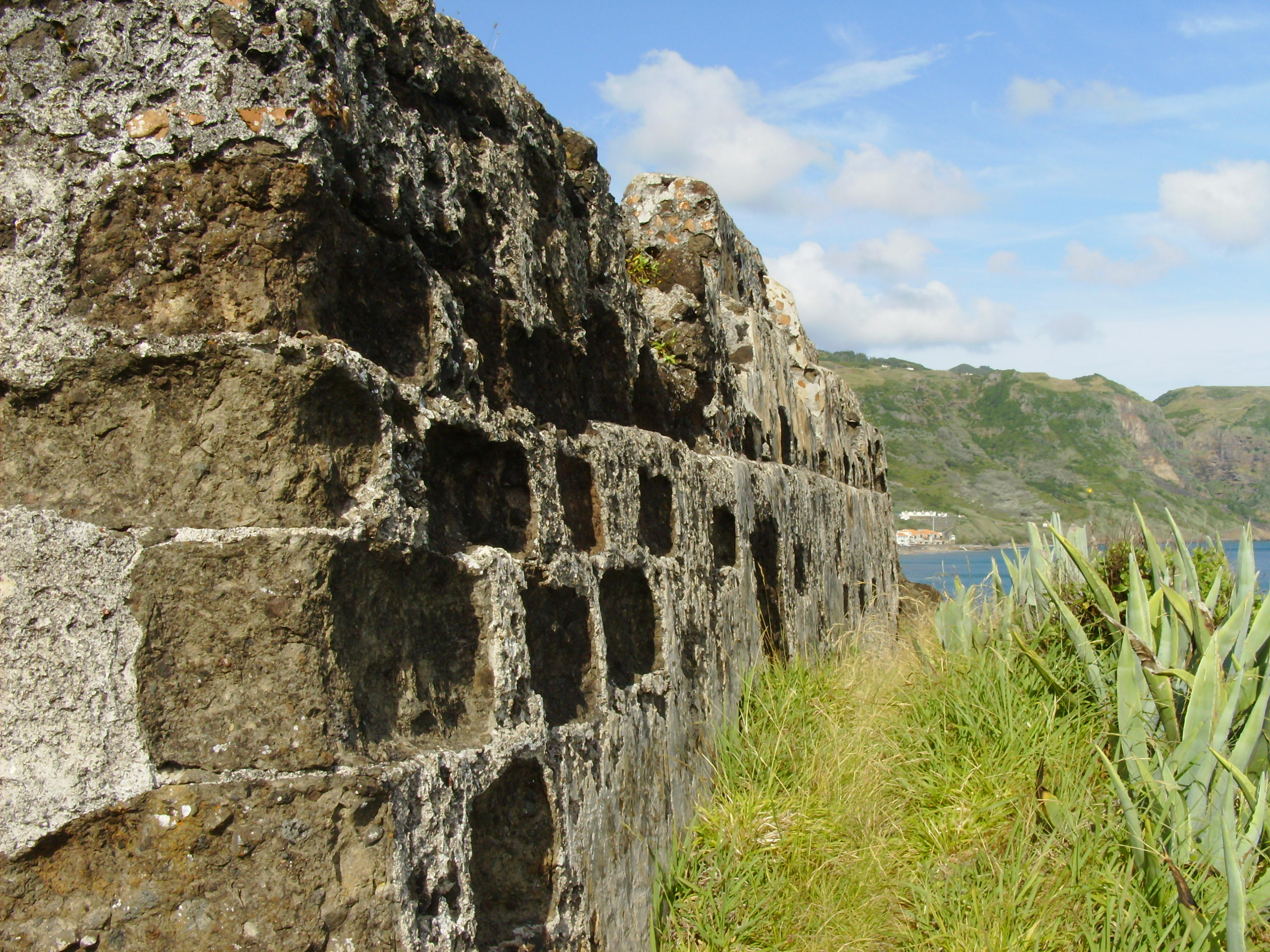
Prainha Fort, an early 18th century fort in Almagreira

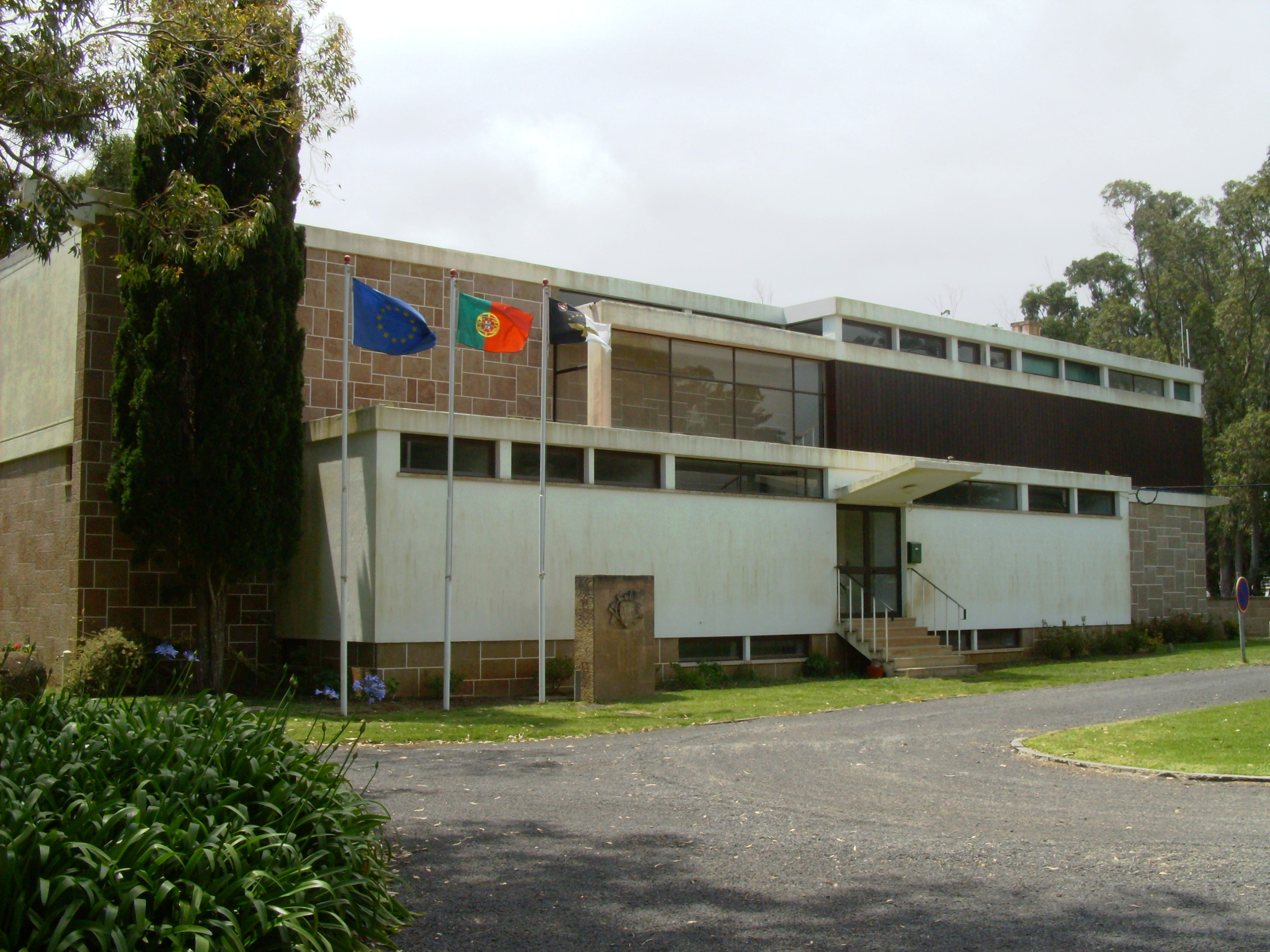
The headquarters building for the Direcção Regional de Recursos Florestais in the Recreational Forest Reserve of Valverde

The first records of a group of islands in the Atlantic (aside from the legends of Atlantis) came from the voyages of Portuguese sailors during the reigns of King Denis (1279–1325) and his successor King Afonso IV (1325–1357). These were unsubstantiated accounts and unofficial, until 1427 when navigator Diogo de Silves found the island of Santa Maria (at that time referred to on nautical charts as Ilha dos Lobos or Ilha do Ovo) during his journey to Madeira. Myth tells that on the day of the island's discovery, Gonçalo Velho Cabral and his crew were celebrating mass (on the feast day of the Virgin Mary), when one of the lookouts spotted the distant island, declaring "Santa Maria": this name would become linked permanently to the island. Santa Maria's discovery was attributed to Gonçalo Velho Cabral in 1432 (rather than the pilot Silves), since discoveries were not "recognized officially" until they declared so by the Portuguese Crown, who registered them in Cabral's name, as commander of the voyage (he had already commanded two voyages of exploration in 1431–1432).

According to legend Cabral's crew disembarked on a small beach in the northwestern Ponte dos Canestrantes, where he encountered a population of Eared seals, proclaiming the beach Praia dos Lobos (from the generic Portuguese lobos-marinhos, or monk seals). The Captain and his crew explored the island, collecting various examples of the native and unfamiliar plants, as well as canisters of earth and water to give to the Infante as proofs to their discovery. The Infante received these "gifts" in 1432, and immediately ordered that herds be sent to the island, while he organized a plan for its colonization. In settling the Azores, the crown applied a system that was successful on the island of Madeira in 1425: the new lands would be administered by title grants (donatário) to a noblemen and men of confidence (donatary-captains) that would oversee security and colonization, while enforcing the King's law. The master or Donatário for the Azores was the Infante Henry the Navigator (in his role as governor of the Order of Christ and Duke of Viseu), who was granted carte blanche to enforce the King's dominion (except to coin money and some judicial authority). The donatário also had the responsibility of selecting or sub-contracting local administrators to represent him, as some historians referred to as captains of the donatary; for his part, Gonçalo Velho, with the support of D. Isabella, was nominated the first captain of the island of Santa Maria and (later) São Miguel, where he arrived in 1439 with colonists, bringing their families and some cattle. By 1460, the chronicler Diogo Gomes de Sintra identified the island as Ilha de Gonçalo Velho, with the choicest lands in the hands of their commander.

Colonization progressed between 1443 and 1447, principally from settlers from the Portuguese Alentejo and Algarve, who populated the northern coast along the Baía dos Anjos (English: Bay of the Angels) and later in the area of Vila do Porto (in the southwest coast). This area would attain the title of Vila do Porto for the nestled anchorage that developed there, and the municipality would also adopt the name, by 1470 (as indicated on their floral). By the end of the 16th century, Santa Maria was divided into three parishes: Nossa Senhora da Assunção (Vila do Porto), Santa Bárbara and Santo Espírito. The governing classes, the families which controlled the politico-administrative organs of the municipality and parishes were all intermingled by marriage and class, and after the Iberian Union this concentration increased.

Similar to other islands of the archipelago, Santa Maria was a victim of repeated attacks by privateers and pirates. In one of the principal engagements, a Castilian carrack with 40 men disembarked in the port of Vila do Porto (in 1480), where they were confronted by residents under the command of the Captain-Major João Soares (nephew of Gonçalo Velho and heir to the Captaincy of Santa Maria and São Miguel), who took to hurl rocks from the cliffs above Calhau da Roupa at the invaders. João Soares was eventually captured by the Spaniards, who took him in irons as a prisoner to Castile. After successive pirate attacks, the population was very hostile to travellers: in February 1493, the travelling Christopher Columbus was greeted harshly by its residents, when he and his crew were forced by a storm to land on the island in the Baía dos Anjos on their return from their famous discovery of the New World. Several of his crew were captured, and complex negotiations were undertaken to liberate them. Thankful for their liberation, a mass was celebrated by him and his party in the old chapel before he returned to Spain. Although relatively far from the routes used by ships traveling to India, the island was repeatedly attacked by French pirates (1553), the island assaulted by French troops (1576), the English (Azores Voyage of 1589 and Moors (1616 and 1675). By the 17th century, a series of fortifications were constructed along the coast to defend the populace from these attacks, including the Fort of São Brás (Vila do Porto) and the (ruined) Fort of São João Baptista in Praia Formosa.

When the 1580 crisis of succession ushered in the Iberian Union in Portugal, the island initially supported António of Crato, but with pressure from Philip II of Spain in the Azores, António declined even to disembark in Santa Maria. During this period, the island came to depend on the Governor General of the Azores. After the Portuguese Restoration War (1640), the news was greeted with celebrations and excesses by the Captain-Major Brás de Sousa.

During the Portuguese Civil War (1828–1834) the citizens supported the rights of Maria II to the throne of Portugal, which differed immensely from the Governor General of the Azores (on the island of São Miguel) who supported Miguel. The Captain-major even attempted to raise arms from Terceira, insofar as sending a carrack to collect the weapons. In the interim, the São Miguel administration changed sides in the conflict. By the following year, several Marienses joined the expeditionary force disembarking on the continent along Arnosa de Pampelido beach (near Mindelo, Vila do Conde) during one of the crucial battles of the Civil War.

During World War II the United States used Santa Maria Airport (Azores) as a base.

On 8 February 1989, an American chartered Boeing 707 of Independent Air Flight 1851 crashed at Pico Alto, killing all 137 passengers and 7 members of the crew. There was confusion between tower and pilots as to the appropriate altitude during their approach.

== Geography ==
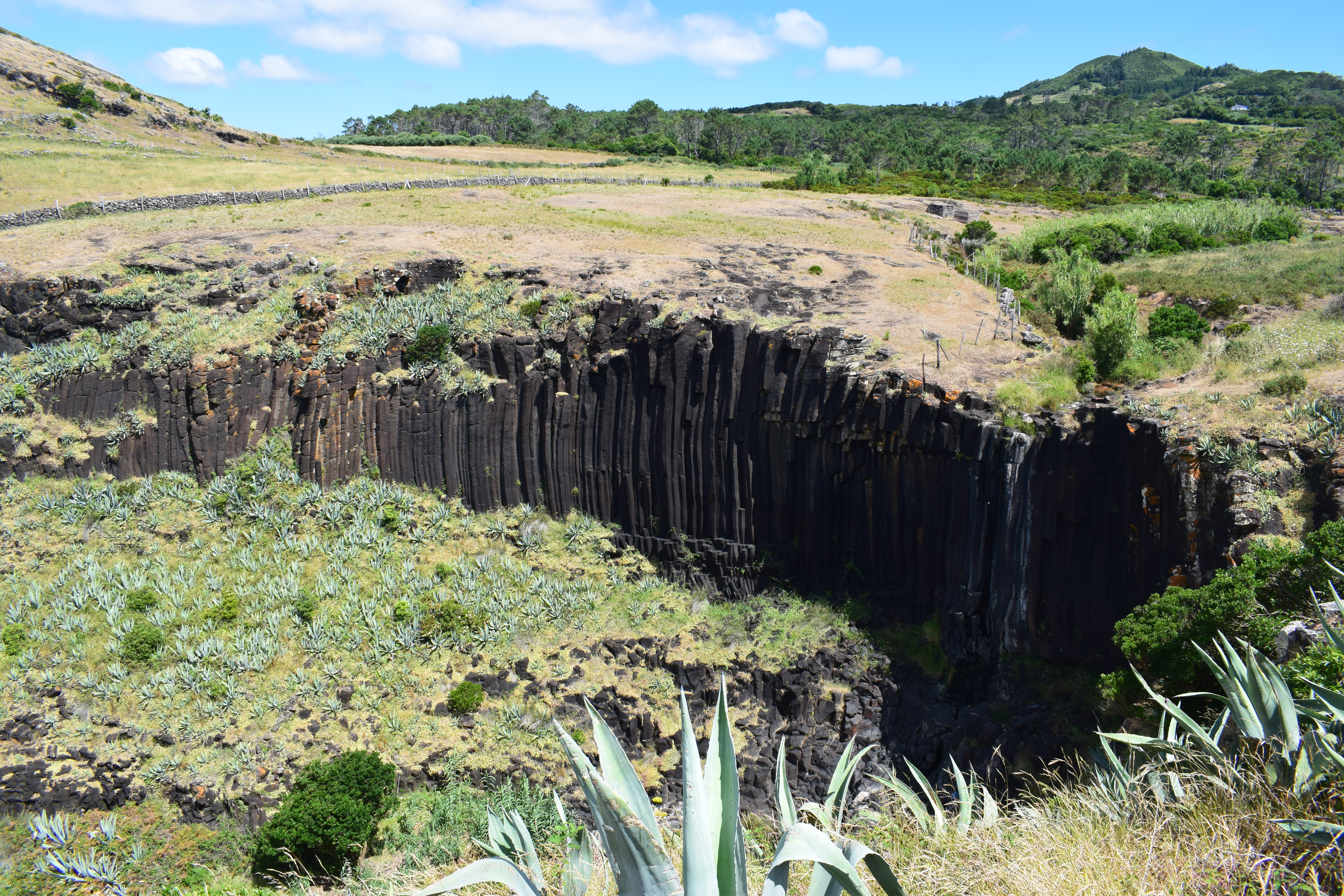
Ribeira do Maloás, 15 to 20 m (49 to 66 ft) tall basalt columns forming a waterfall

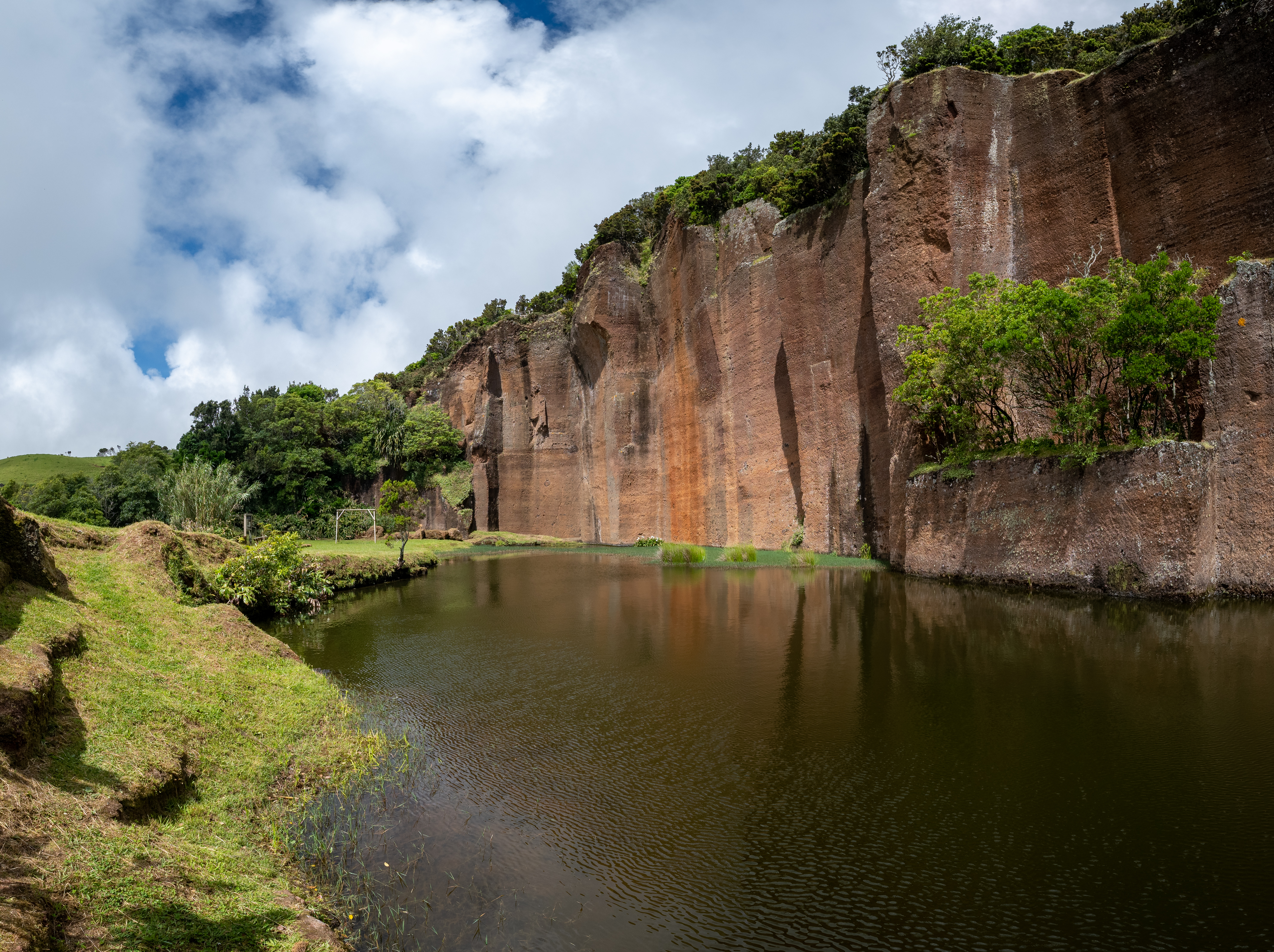
Poço da Pedreira

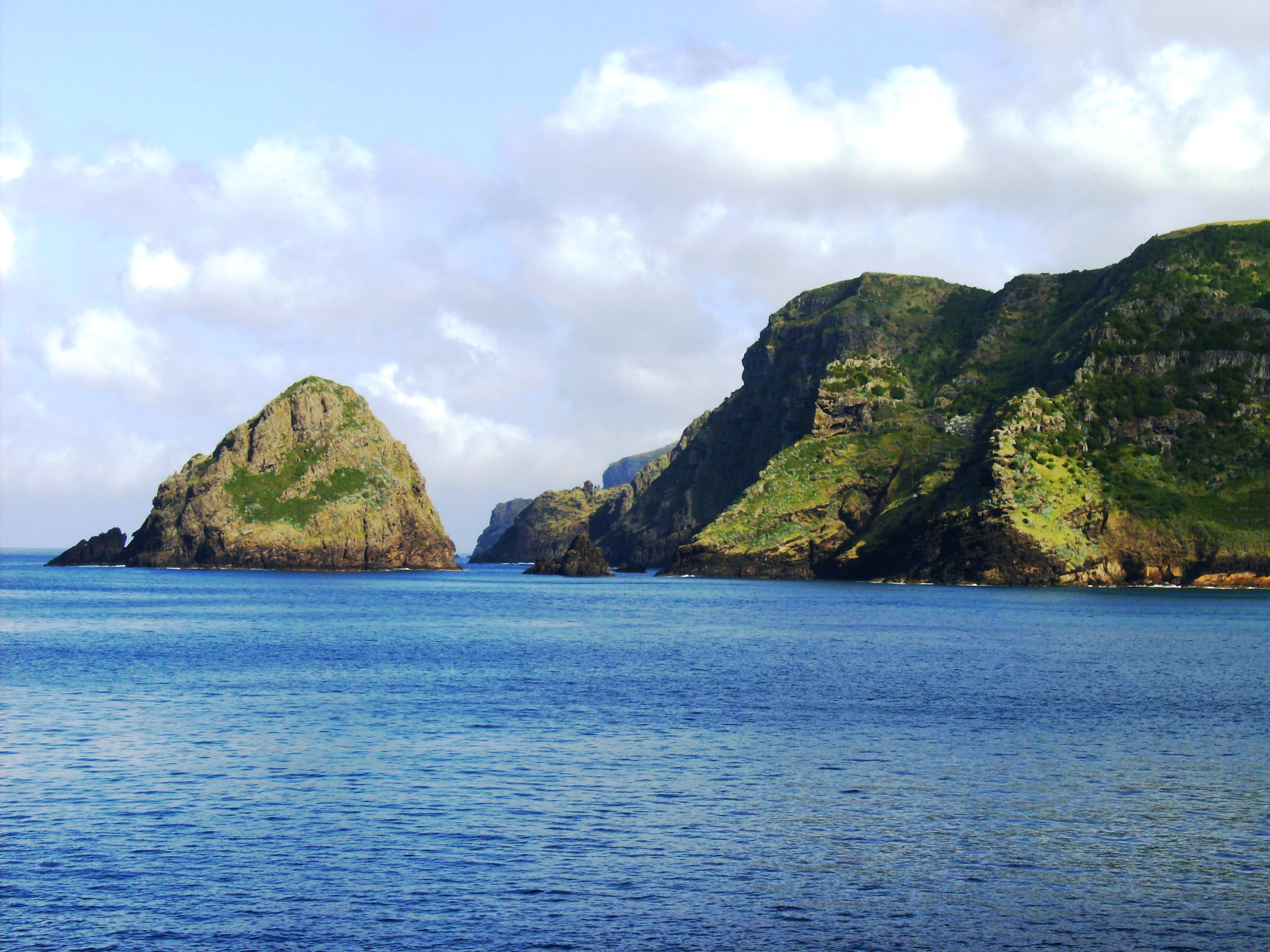
São Lourenço Islet.

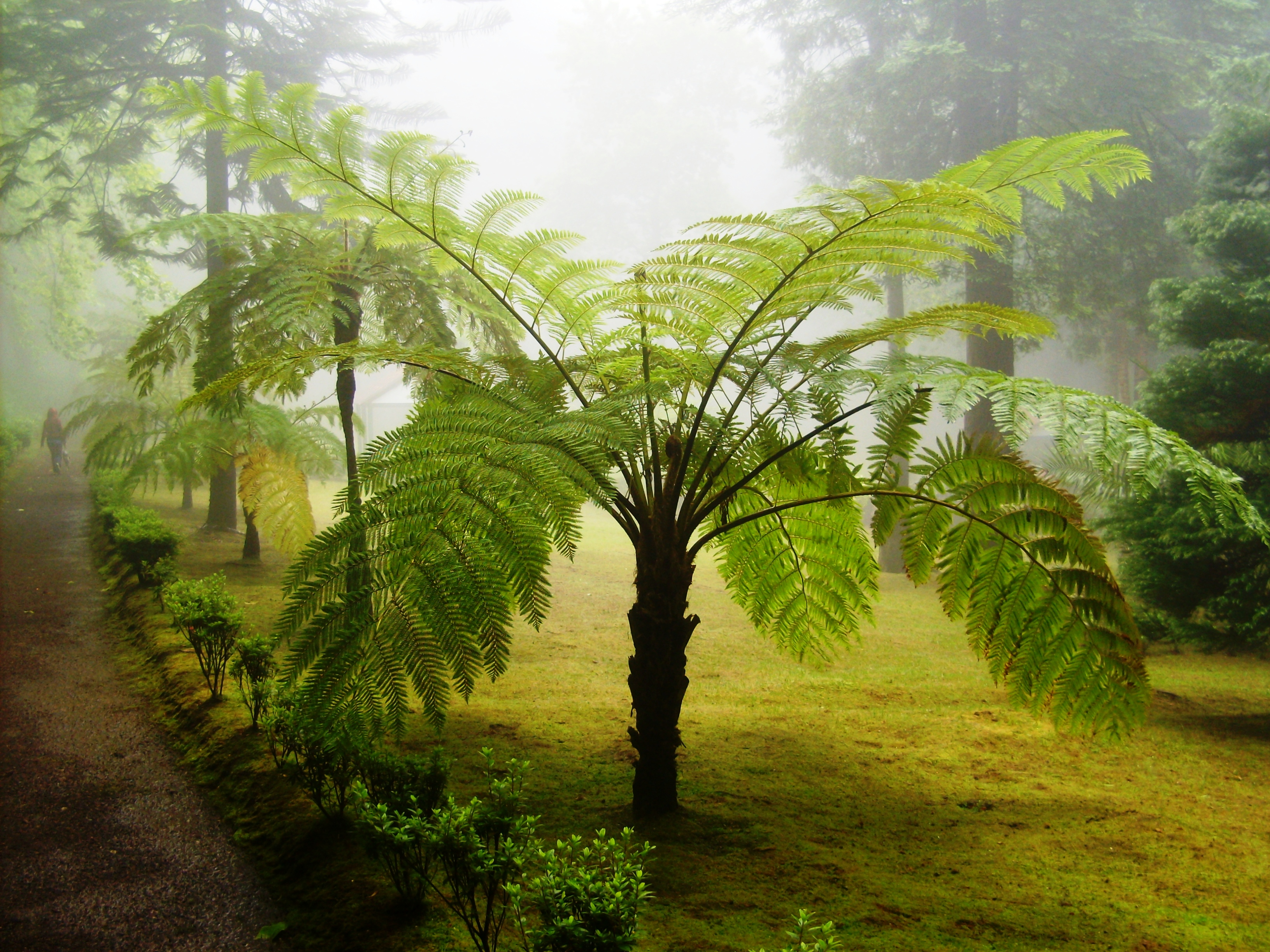
Recreational Forest Reserve of Fontinhas

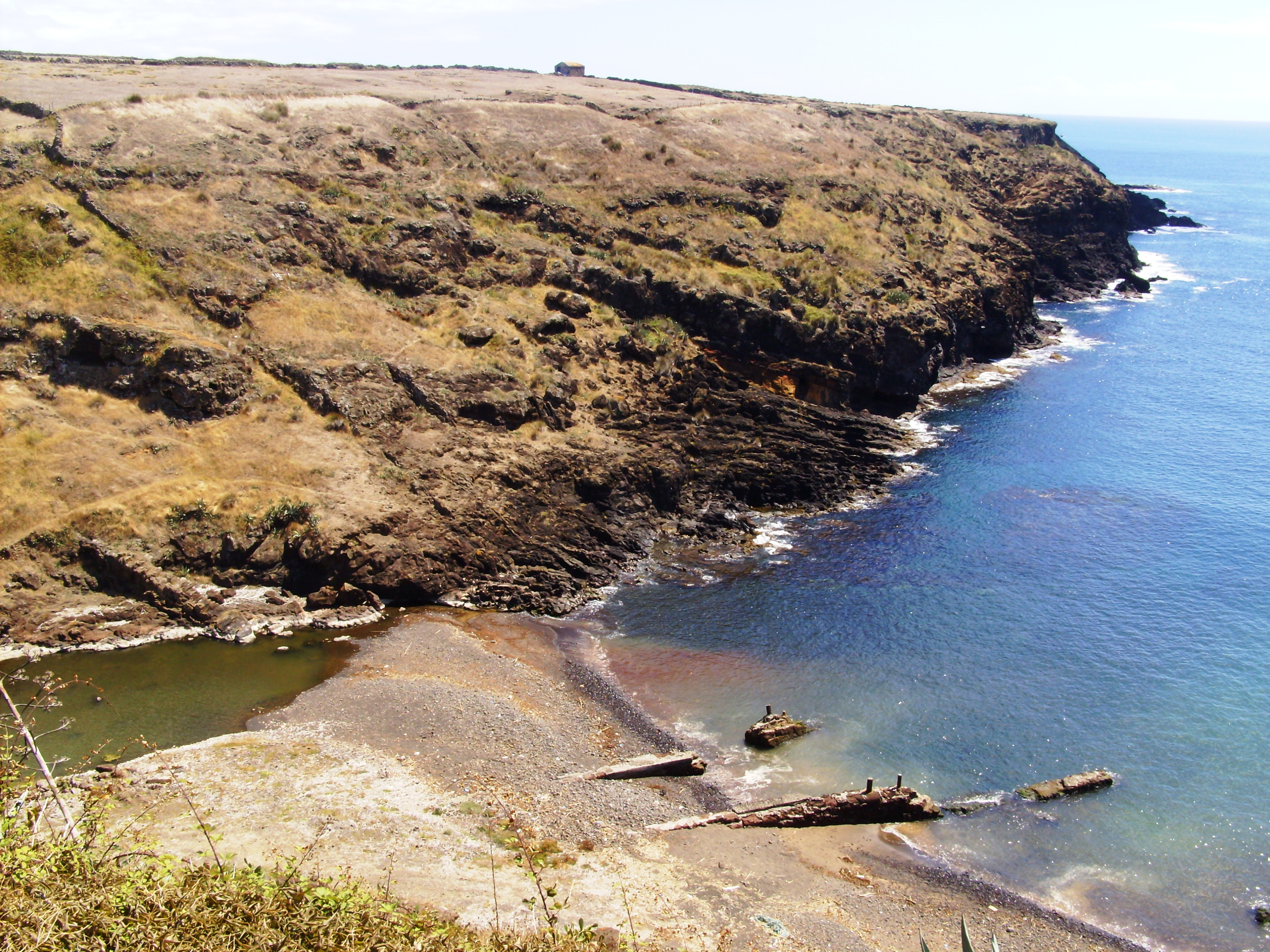
Calhau da Roupa, the old port of Vila do Porto, and the natural terminus of the Regional Natural Monument of Pedreira do Campo, Figueiral and Prainha

=== Physical geography ===
The island is located in the southeast corner of the Azores archipelago, 100 kilometres (62 mi) south of São Miguel, and 600 kilometres (370 mi) from the island of Flores (the westernmost island in the archipelago). The island of Santa Maria is oblong and measures 97.4 square kilometres (37.6 sq mi), extending 12 km (7 mi) from the northwest to southeast. Geologically, it is the oldest island in the archipelago, with formations that are 8.12 million years old. The island emerged during the Miocene (approximately 10-8 million years ago), with volcanic activity extending until the Pliocene (2 millions year ago), alternating between phases of effusive and explosive, sub-aerial and submarine eruptions. Between these were periods of sedimentary sequences between the volcanic series, that dated from the final Miocene (5.5 million years ago) until the Quaternary (130,000 years ago). Due to its age, and no historical evidence of volcanism, the geography of the island tends to be more mature and includes larger deposits of sediments than can be found on the other islands of the archipelago. Generally, Santa Maria is known for the lack of volcanism during period of human intervention, although seismic events are common due to its proximity to the Glória Fault (an offshoot of the Azores–Gibraltar Transform Fault).

Its volcanic origin is characterized by a substratum of basalt deformed by a series of fractures that run along a northwest to southeast orientation (interlaced with lode and deposits of mafic silicate material), resulting in the following volcano-stratigraphic layers:

- The Cabrestantes Formation, at the island's base, corresponding to the probable emergence of the island during multiple submarine eruptions;
- The Anjos Complex, a sub-aerial and effusive formation created from eruptions between 8–5.5 million years;
- The Touril Complex, a formation created during an intermittent period of eruptions, when fossil deposits and sediments accumulated on the island, around 5 million years ago;
- The Facho-Pico Alto Complex, an intense volcanic period of both submarine and sub-aerial eruptions between 5-3 million years ago concentrating the aforementioned Facho and Pico Alto mountains;
- A period of coastal erosion during the Pliocene period resulting from a sea rise;
- The Feteiras Formation, resulting in the formation of three sub-aerial escoria cones along the coastal erosion platform (between 2–1.8 million years ago); and
- A secondary coastal erosion period during the Quaternary.

Successive periods of sea rise have given rise to sediments of marine fossils discovered on the island (in Prainha and Lagoinhas), mollusks that date back approximately 2.7 to less than one million years (the Pleistocene epoch), and others (in Ponta do Castelo) dating back 5 millions of years (to the end of Miocene and beginning of the Pliocene). These deposits are evidence of an older island environment associated with both volcanic and sedimentary development. The presence of these deposits, unique in the Azores, gave rise to the lime (calcium oxide) industry during the 19th century. The fossil deposits, usually located approximately 40 metres (130 ft) above sea level, have been the subject of several palaeontological studies including Georg Hartung (1860), Reiss (1862), Bronn (1860), Mayer (1864), Friedlander (1929) and José Agostinho (1937). The Regional Nature Reserve of Figueiral and Prainha, which includes the Regional Natural Monument of Pedreira do Campo, were created by decree of the Regional Assembly in order to preserve and protect this area of natural geological interest.

The island is marked by two geomorphological regions:

- A dry clay plain lies in the west, occupying two-thirds of the island, with its highest point 277 meters (909 ft) above sea level (near Piquinhos). Due to the impermeability of the soils, this regions is arid with fewer leafy plants or grasses. To the north and south the principal points of colonization occurred (Anjos and Vila do Porto, respectively), and 65% of the current population resides in this region, which includes the parishes of Vila do Porto, São Pedro and Almagreira. Airport lands represent the largest use of the space, as the Santa Maria airport is located along the western coast taking advantage of the plain and lack of natural obstacles. River valleys along the north and south divide many of the communities.
- The eastern one-third of the island is composed of eroded hills and mountains, covered by areas of thick vegetation, pasture lands and river valleys. The tallest points on the island, Pico Alto (590 m), Cavacas (491 m) and Caldeira (481 m) are located in this region, which includes the parishes of Santa Bárbara and Santo Espírito, the more rural and agricultural lands on the island. This is a region of higher levels of humidity, with greater instances of wind, fog and precipitation, resulting in rich vegetation and endemic plant species.

In addition, there are several calcium encrusted fossil deposits associated with marine deposits, during a period of island formation associated with Surtseyan activity.

Soils in the drier western region are predominantly red clay, a consequence of natural alterations associated with pyroclastic deposits during the Palaeocene period, when the island's climate was warmer and more humid, and the median sea level was 100 metres (330 ft) below current sea levels. These conditions allowed the formation of a fine clay, used later to support the pottery industry and export market (primarily to Vila Franca do Campo and Lagoa on São Miguel to be used as raw commodity for their traditional potteries. In Barreiro da Faneca, the Regional Assembly decreed a protected plain of this arid soil in order to protect and preserve its characteristics.

Generally, the island coast is ringed by steep cliffs, finding their prominence in the area of Rocha Alta (340 m). In addition, several protected bays along the coast shelter white sand beaches or are guarded by many rocky islets. These include the villages of São Lourenço (and its islet), Praia Formosa (and its long sandy beaches) or the craggy islet of Lagoínhas in the north coast. Forestry, covering about 19 hectares (47 acres), is confined to high-density Cryptomeria trees planted along the slopes of Pico Alto, and unkept parcels of wild plants dominated by mock orange (Pittosporum undulatum), common juniper (Juniperus communis), and laurel (Laurus azorica).

==== Ecoregions and protected areas ====
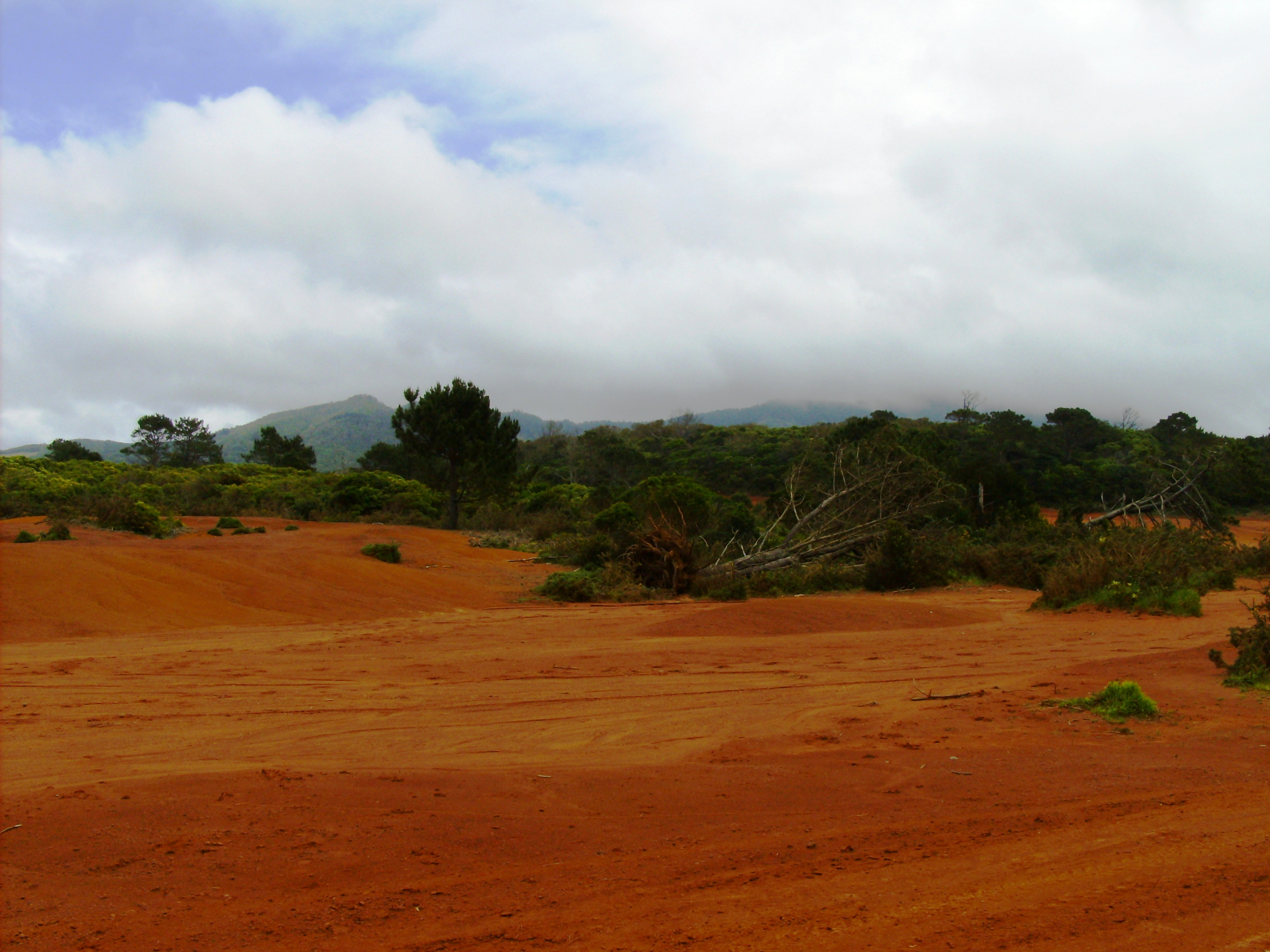
Barreiro da Faneca.

Several natural landscapes have been preserved or designated points of natural interest by the Regional Government in order to foster conservation and support endemic flora and fauna species, as well as provide communal forms of recreation and nature interpretation. On 7 November 2008, the Regional Government legislated the creation (under Regional Legislative Decree 47/2008/A) of the Parque Natural da Ilha de Santa Maria (Nature Park of the Island of Santa Maria) in order to encapsulate and administer the various territorial units into one scheme, that includes thirteen protected areas. In addition, the Direcção Regional dos Recursos Florestais (Regional Directorate for Forest Resources), which is responsible for the administration of forest resources and parks on the island, maintains and promotes the island's forest reserves. Much like other islands of the Azores, there are many pedestrian walking trails and hiking circuits throughout the island. The hiking circuits allow the user to experience a range of diverse ecosystems and protected areas of the island that are not easily accessible to most tourists.

=== Climate ===
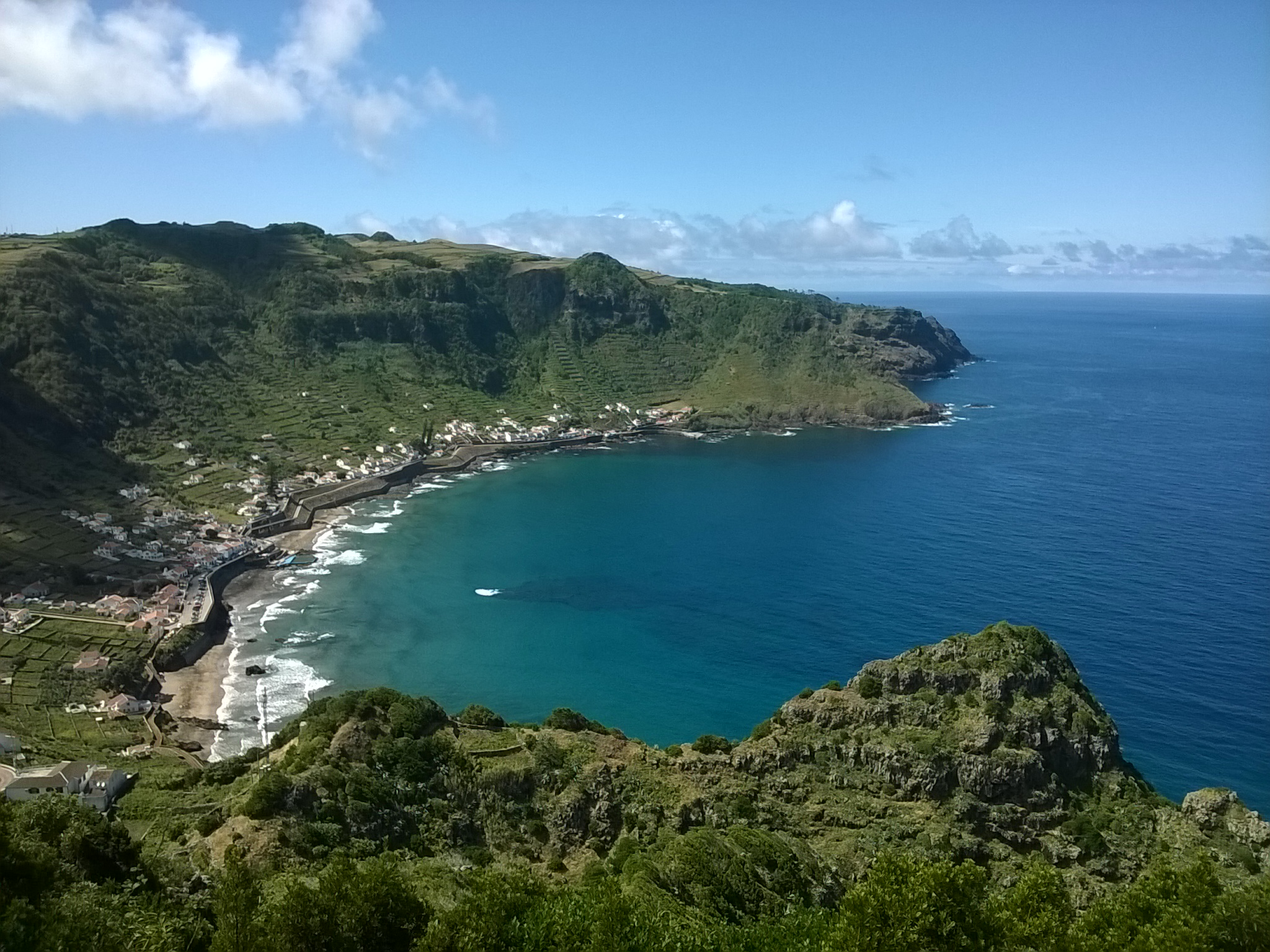
Bay of São Lourenço

Santa Maria has a mild Mediterranean climate (Köppen: Csa). The island as well as the whole archipelago has an extremely moderate subtropical climate due to its location in the Atlantic Ocean influenced by the Gulf Stream. In the summer it is generally dry and warm. In winter, temperatures remain very mild, the bulk of the year's precipitation falls in this season, though Santa Maria is much drier than the rest of the islands, having less than half the precipitation of the more westerly Flores Island. Temperatures average 18.5 °C (65.3 °F) in the coast and around 14.5 °C (58.1 °F) in the easterly mountains. The "sunny island of the Azores", as its nickname suggests, receives on average around 2000-2200 hours of sunshine which is a considerable amount for the relatively dull archipelago it is in, though not a lot when compared to other places at the same latitude (like the Algarve in mainland Portugal). The mountain range east of the island and the northeast coast are much more humid, reaching in some locations values as high as 1,800 mm (71 in) of precipitation per year.

The island received a direct hit from Hurricane Gordon in the early hours of August 20, 2012, with winds of 120 km/h (75 mph) gusting to 170 km/h (110 mph). Gordon was a category 2 hurricane shortly before landfall. As a result, extensive preparations were made and there were no deaths and damage was limited to vegetation. A tropical cyclone with the same name also passed previously in 2006, crossing the Azores on Sept. 19-20 as a Category 1 hurricane, producing a wind gust of 82 km/h (51 mph) on Santa Maria island.

Measurements have been taken at the Santa Maria Airport since 1943/1944, initially managed by British or US air forces serving there. Later, another meteorological station was placed in the Recreational Forest Reserve of Fontinhas.

Climate data for Santa Maria Island (Santa Maria Airport), elevation: 100 m or 330 ft, 1971-1994 normals, 1961-1990 extremes
Month	Jan	Feb	Mar	Apr	May	Jun	Jul	Aug	Sep	Oct	Nov	Dec	Year
Record high °C (°F)	20.2 (68.4)	20.4 (68.7)	22.0 (71.6)	21.6 (70.9)	23.6 (74.5)	25.7 (78.3)	28.2 (82.8)	28.5 (83.3)	28.2 (82.8)	26.5 (79.7)	23.4 (74.1)	23.5 (74.3)	28.5 (83.3)
Mean daily maximum °C (°F)	16.8 (62.2)	16.6 (61.9)	17.2 (63.0)	18.0 (64.4)	19.5 (67.1)	21.6 (70.9)	24.1 (75.4)	25.3 (77.5)	24.5 (76.1)	22.0 (71.6)	19.6 (67.3)	18.0 (64.4)	20.3 (68.5)
Daily mean °C (°F)	14.4 (57.9)	14.1 (57.4)	14.7 (58.5)	15.3 (59.5)	16.7 (62.1)	18.8 (65.8)	21.2 (70.2)	22.3 (72.1)	21.6 (70.9)	19.4 (66.9)	17.2 (63.0)	15.6 (60.1)	17.6 (63.7)
Mean daily minimum °C (°F)	12.0 (53.6)	11.5 (52.7)	12.2 (54.0)	12.6 (54.7)	13.9 (57.0)	16.1 (61.0)	18.2 (64.8)	19.4 (66.9)	18.7 (65.7)	16.8 (62.2)	14.8 (58.6)	13.2 (55.8)	15.0 (58.9)
Record low °C (°F)	6.2 (43.2)	4.8 (40.6)	5.5 (41.9)	7.0 (44.6)	9.4 (48.9)	10.0 (50.0)	12.4 (54.3)	14.6 (58.3)	13.2 (55.8)	10.6 (51.1)	8.2 (46.8)	6.5 (43.7)	4.8 (40.6)
Average precipitation mm (inches)	86.4 (3.40)	71.8 (2.83)	64.7 (2.55)	56.3 (2.22)	38.8 (1.53)	21.7 (0.85)	25.9 (1.02)	36.8 (1.45)	59.7 (2.35)	77.0 (3.03)	112.7 (4.44)	77.7 (3.06)	729.5 (28.73)
Average precipitation days (≥ 1.0 mm)	12	11	10	7	5	4	4	6	8	10	11	12	100
Average relative humidity (%)	79	78	78	75	75	76	75	75	76	77	78	79	77
Mean monthly sunshine hours	94	101	133	157	218	197	247	243	187	149	109	98	1,933
Source 1: IPMA (normals and precipitation)
Source 2: NOAA (extremes, humidity & sunshine hours)

An alternative source with more recent averages gives different values.

Climate data for Santa Maria Airport weather station (LPAZ) 1991−2020 normals
Month	Jan	Feb	Mar	Apr	May	Jun	Jul	Aug	Sep	Oct	Nov	Dec	Year
Record high °C (°F)	22.0 (71.6)	24.0 (75.2)	23.6 (74.5)	24.5 (76.1)	28.0 (82.4)	28.0 (82.4)	29.4 (84.9)	30.6 (87.1)	28.5 (83.3)	31.1 (88.0)	26.0 (78.8)	24.5 (76.1)	31.1 (88.0)
Mean daily maximum °C (°F)	17.5 (63.5)	17.3 (63.1)	17.9 (64.2)	18.8 (65.8)	20.2 (68.4)	22.4 (72.3)	24.8 (76.6)	26.1 (79.0)	25.2 (77.4)	22.8 (73.0)	20.1 (68.2)	18.4 (65.1)	21.0 (69.7)
Daily mean °C (°F)	15.5 (59.9)	15.0 (59.0)	15.3 (59.5)	16.1 (61.0)	17.6 (63.7)	19.7 (67.5)	22.0 (71.6)	23.3 (73.9)	22.4 (72.3)	20.2 (68.4)	17.8 (64.0)	16.2 (61.2)	18.4 (65.2)
Mean daily minimum °C (°F)	13.3 (55.9)	12.7 (54.9)	12.8 (55.0)	13.5 (56.3)	14.8 (58.6)	17.0 (62.6)	19.1 (66.4)	20.4 (68.7)	19.5 (67.1)	17.7 (63.9)	15.4 (59.7)	14.0 (57.2)	15.9 (60.5)
Record low °C (°F)	1.9 (35.4)	0.9 (33.6)	5.0 (41.0)	6.8 (44.2)	9.0 (48.2)	10.0 (50.0)	12.0 (53.6)	13.0 (55.4)	10.2 (50.4)	8.2 (46.8)	7.0 (44.6)	6.2 (43.2)	0.9 (33.6)
Average precipitation mm (inches)	99.1 (3.90)	77.4 (3.05)	93.3 (3.67)	79.9 (3.15)	65.1 (2.56)	38.7 (1.52)	29.0 (1.14)	43.1 (1.70)	63.2 (2.49)	137.7 (5.42)	94.4 (3.72)	155.0 (6.10)	975.9 (38.42)
Average precipitation days (≥ 1.0 mm)	12.8	10.4	11.8	10.3	9.3	5.2	4.6	6.0	8.8	13.3	11.5	15.6	119.6
Mean monthly sunshine hours	124.6	145.4	194.0	205.6	247.4	245.3	262.6	248.6	181.9	163.0	138.8	107.2	2,264.4
Source 1: Meteo Climat normals, 1991−2021
Source 2: Meteo Climat extremes, 1953−present

=== Human geography ===
Due to the varying geomorphology, the population built homes dispersed throughout the island, forming small nuclei along zones with access to potable water (in the west) and in the valleys (in the east). Traditional homes were constructed from the ubiquitous black volcanic rock, painted white, with doors and windows accented in the available colors of the day. The chimneys of these homes are unique since, heavily influenced by styles from the Alentejo and Algarve, these were ornate or simple, but generally different from house to house.

Politically, the island is one municipality, Vila do Porto, with a population of 5,578 inhabitants (2001), divided into five parishes:

- Vila do Porto: includes one-third of the island, covering the western plain, the airport and local communities such as Anjos and Santana, encompassing 2,997 of the island's citizens.
- São Pedro: the northern parish, it includes the communities of Fátima, Paul and Pilar: 841 inhabitants (2001)
- Almagreira: the southern dry zone and transitional space that includes Praia Formosa and parts of the mountainous areas of Monteiro and Bom Despacho: 537 inhabitants (2001)
- Santo Espírito: the eastern corner covering Maia, Glória and Fontinhas: 723 inhabitants (2001)
- Santa Bárbara: the northern and eastern parish that includes Lagoínhas, Norte and the São Lourenço: 480 inhabitants (2001).

== Economy ==
The island's economy passed through much of the cyclical evolution associated with the Azores. Initially, the economy was based on the production of wheat and woad, until the 16th century, evolving slowly to a subsistence economy based on cereal crops. This was also a period of pottery production, and export of the fine red clay to artisans on São Miguel (for the production of the same).

Generally isolated from the traffic between the New World and Europe, the island depended heavily on agriculture until the 20th century, when the U.S. military established the airport in Ginjal. It became an international link after 1944, taking on a central position in trans-Atlantic air traffic during the mid-20th century. The island became dependent, almost absolutely, on the airport: first, during the phase of construction (when Marienses were involved in the construction or support), and later when air traffic control in the North Atlantic corridor was based in Santa Maria (FIR Oceânica de Santa Maria). For many decades, the airport at Santa Maria was the gateway to and from the Azores until the construction or renovation of smaller fields on other islands. Changing developments in the aviation industry (primarily of long-range airliners) reduced the importance of Santa Maria as a trans-Atlantic stop, and other airports (such as those in Lajes, Horta and Ponta Delgada), better equipped and logistically advanced, diminished the importance of activities on Santa Maria.

The European Space Agency (ESA) established a satellite tracking station at the end of the 20th century, rekindling the debate on the island's dependency on the aviation sector. Similarly, in 2012, a proposal by EDISOFT to install a Galileo Sensor Station (GSS) station in Santa Maria was successful: the Mariense station won out over other sites in Madeira and the Canary Islands. This continued the island's importance as a technological and communications hub in the Atlantic, following the installation of the Rede Atlântica de Estações Geodinâmicas e Espaciais (Atlantic Network of Geodynamic and Spatial Stations) VLBI antenna, on the heels of the protocol signed on 29 April 2010, between the Secretário Regional da Ciência, Tecnologia e Equipamentos (Regional Secretary for Science, Technology and Equipment) and the Diretor Geral do Instituto Geográfico Nacional de Espanha (Director-General of the National Geographic Institute of Spain).

In comparison with the other islands, the raising of cattle and milk production never attained the same level of development. Agriculture is still the predominant activity in the municipality, occupying 47.6% of the land. This activity is usually confined to small ventures, involving forging plants, small pastures and permanent holdings. There are several commercial species of fish in the waters around Santa Maria, such as sheepshead, vejas, red snapper, grouper, wrasse, mackerel, anchovies, needlefish and frigate tuna. Secondary industries are dominated by civil construction, sawmills, tile and block factories, and artisan/handicraft manufacture.

As with the rest of the Azores, tourism makes up an important tertiary sector, associated with nautical activities such as sailing, windsurfing, water-skiing, sport fishing (tuna, swordfish, and grouper) and scuba-diving, beach activities, pedestrian hiking, and rabbit hunting. The villages of São Lourenço, Praia Formosa, Maia and Anjos are known as summer tourist centers, attracting visitors to their beaches, natural pools, summer homes, and festivals.

== Transportation ==
Direct flights to the continent (Lisbon) are provided primarily by TAP Air Portugal out of Santa Maria Airport located close to Vila do Porto. The airport also provides some direct connections to the rest of the archipelago through SATA Air Açores.

An inter-island ferry, owned by Azorean maritime transport operator AtlânticoLine, serves Santa Maria weekly during the summer. Similarly, inaugurated in 2007, the marina in Vila do Porto allows access to the island throughout the year.

Bus and taxi service is provided throughout the island.

=== Power supply ===
The Santa Maria Island power station is close to the airport, and uses diesel generators: 3 X 1.5 MW MAN and 2 x Caterpillar 3516 1.5 MW, 1 x Caterpillar D398 0.8 MW. The MAN generators run on heavy fuel, while the Caterpillars use petroleum distillate. There is a Caterpillar 3408 300 kW diesel for black start.

The island also has access to 5 x 1.5 MW wind turbines, which are limited to 50% peak demand due to frequency control concerns. Wind provides 17% of power sent out over the year. The Power Authority is installing a 70 kW flywheel storage system taken from another island to increase wind proportion to deal with frequency excursions.

== Architecture ==
There are many examples (public buildings, churches and auxiliary structures, military constructions) of Santa Maria's cultural heritage that have been remodelled, conserved and preserved for their important histo-cultural value. Since Santa Maria was the first island to be colonized, there are older examples of these buildings and structures that have lasted longer, due to no historical volcanism and fewer earthquakes.

== Culture ==
=== Festivities ===
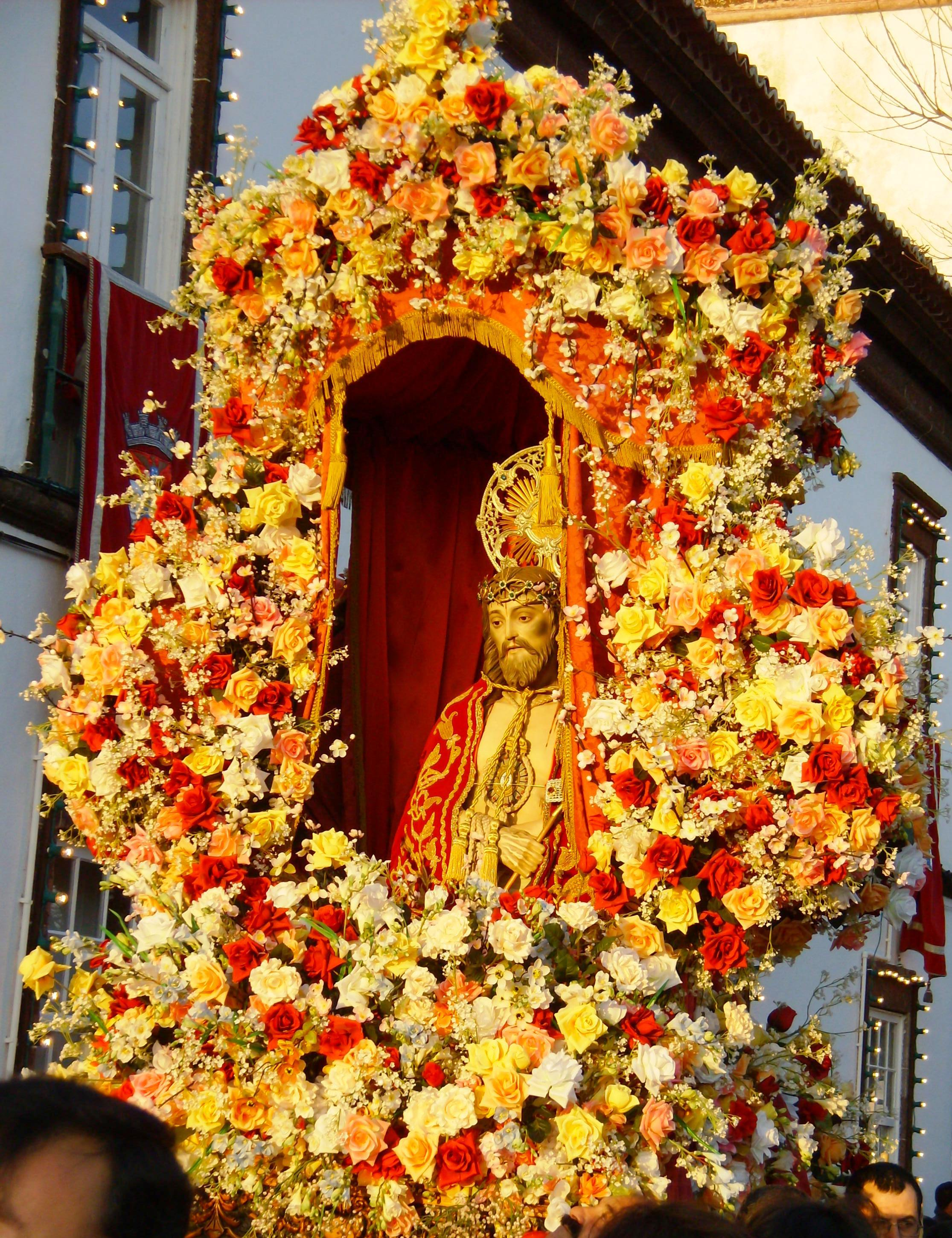
The image of the Lord Holy Christ of the Miracles: although smaller than celebrations on neighbouring São Miguel island, the festival is still the largest event of religious year in Azores.

Mariense culture, much like the rest of the Azores, is heavily influenced by traditional religious festivals and feasts. In particular, the festival of the Divine Holy Spirit, closely tied to the 14th-century Queen Elizabeth of Portugal, was implanted during the island's colonization by the Order of Christ and Franciscan friars and continues to mark the island's calendars. These festivals include a religious ceremony and the crowning of one or more children with a silver-plated crown adorned with the symbols of the Holy Spirit, and culminates with a grand feast on seventh Sunday following Pentecost. On the occasion of these feasts, a traditional soup of bread soaked in a meat broth is distributed freely at the "Irmandades" and "Impérios" across the island.

In addition to parochial celebrations associated with local saints, the island celebrates a festival in honour of the Lord Holy Christ of the Miracles. On 15 August each year, the municipality also celebrates a festival in honour of Nossa Senhora da Assunção (Our Lady of the Assumption), the patron saint of Vila do Porto.

During the last week of August, Praia Formosa is home to a world music festival: Maré de Agosto (August Tide Festival). The beach community is regularly overrun with tourists and local visitors, who travel to the island to listen to world music acts, which in the past have included John Lee Hooker Jr., Kíla, Skatalites, Angélique Kidjo, Rui Veloso and Gentleman.

Annual festivities come to a private close with the festival of the Confraria dos Escravos da Cadeinha, in Anjos, at the beginning of September. A secular celebration, it is a private fraternal social and cultural event that celebrates the defence of Santa Maria (and in particular Anjos) from pirate attacks, organized by the Centro Cultural Cristóvão Colombo.

=== Tradition ===
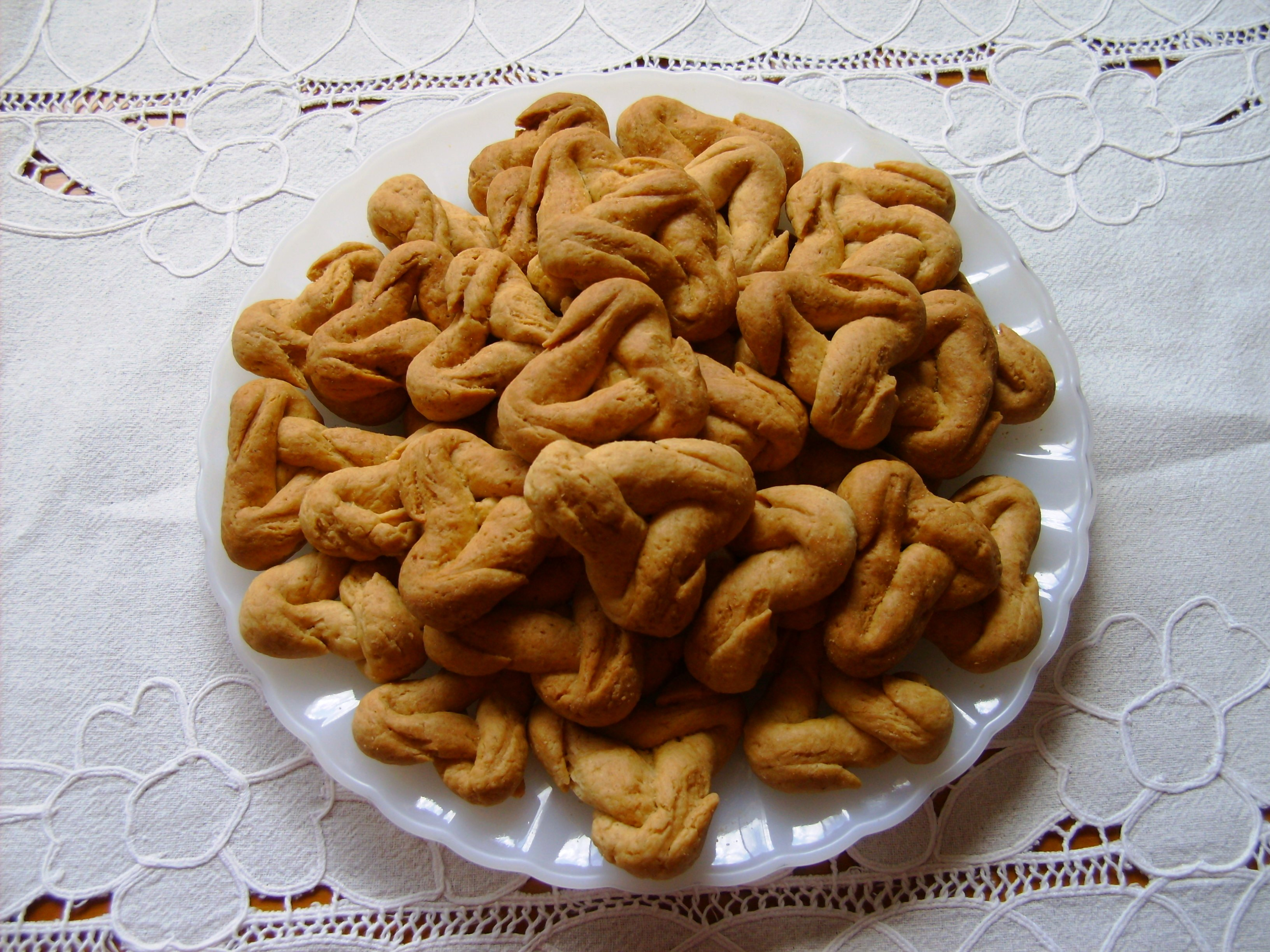
Biscoitos de Orelha (literally Ear Cookies) a regional specialty of the island of Santa Maria

The handicraft industry in Santa Maria is centred on pottery, ceramics and wool sweaters, ornate sheets, blankets, towels and other embroidery. Homespun garments include coarse woollen jerseys, embroidered linen shirts, embroidered women's jackets and estamin suits. Similarly, straw hats, baskets and various other objects traditionally made from wood, fish scales, corn flask and metal are sold as souvenirs. These activities have been organized by the Santa Maria Handicrafts Cooperative, which also promotes other unique Mariense products: bread, sweets, pastry-making and weaving.

Traditional music and folk dancing are heavily influenced by the styles of the Beiras and Alentejo regions. Several folk groups have developed on the island that reproduce the clothing styles, the music and traditional dance. Due to factors such as the climate and insular environment the style of music, songs, dance and instruments used (such as the viola de arame). Many of the dances have curious names, such as Pézinho da Garça (the Herons' Foot dance), Moda do Moinho de Mão (the Style of Hand Mill), Alfinete (the Pin), Balão (the Balloon), and Mouros (Moors). The Museu Etnográfico de Santo Espírito (Ethnographic Museum of Santo Espírito) relates aspects of the history and culture of the island.

Apart from the sopas do impéro (soups traditionally served during Pentecost), Santa Maria has a rich gastronomic history that includes sopa de nabos (a turnip soup), bolo de panela (a pan cake), Ccçoila (a thick meat stew in a traditional ceramic pot), molho de figado (a liver stew/sauce), sopa de peixe (fish soup), and caldeirada de peixe (a mixture of fish or seafood in broth or bread). Sweet desserts, such as suspiros (meringues), melindres (honey cakes), biscoitos encanelados, tigeladas (a pudding), biscoitos de orelha, biscoitos brancos, biscoitos de aguardente and cavacas (sugar-coated biscuits), are also popular.

Similarly, the wines of the São Lourenço foothills, as well as other wines and sweet liqueurs, have been commercialized. These include vinho abafadinho and vinho abafado (both fortified wine liqueurs), licor de amora (mulberry liqueur), licor de leite (milk liqueur) and aguardente, which are made using traditional techniques and favoured following a dinner.

== Tourism ==
Tourists generally favour the white sand beaches and rock pools in the communities of Anjos (Vila do Porto), Praia Formosa (Almagreira), Maia (Santo Espírito) and São Lourenço (Santa Bárbara). Praia Formosa, in particular, is known on the island for its white sand beach that stretches across the bay. In the remaining locales, the original natural rock pools have been replaced by concrete pools with seawater access.

== Notable people ==
- João Soares de Sousa (1493 in Vila do Porto – 1571) the third Donatary-Captain of Santa Maria
- Estêvão Pires de Alpoim (1520-1570s) a nobleman and Notary of government in the Azores Islands
- Amador Vaz de Alpoim (1568–1617) a nobleman, conquistador, colonizer and explorer of South America
- Margarida Cabral de Melo (1570–1631) a noble lady, wife of Amador Vaz de Alpoim
- Youssef Chermiti (born 2004), footballer
