= Regional Natural Monument of Pedreira do Campo =

- IUCN category III (natural monument or feature)
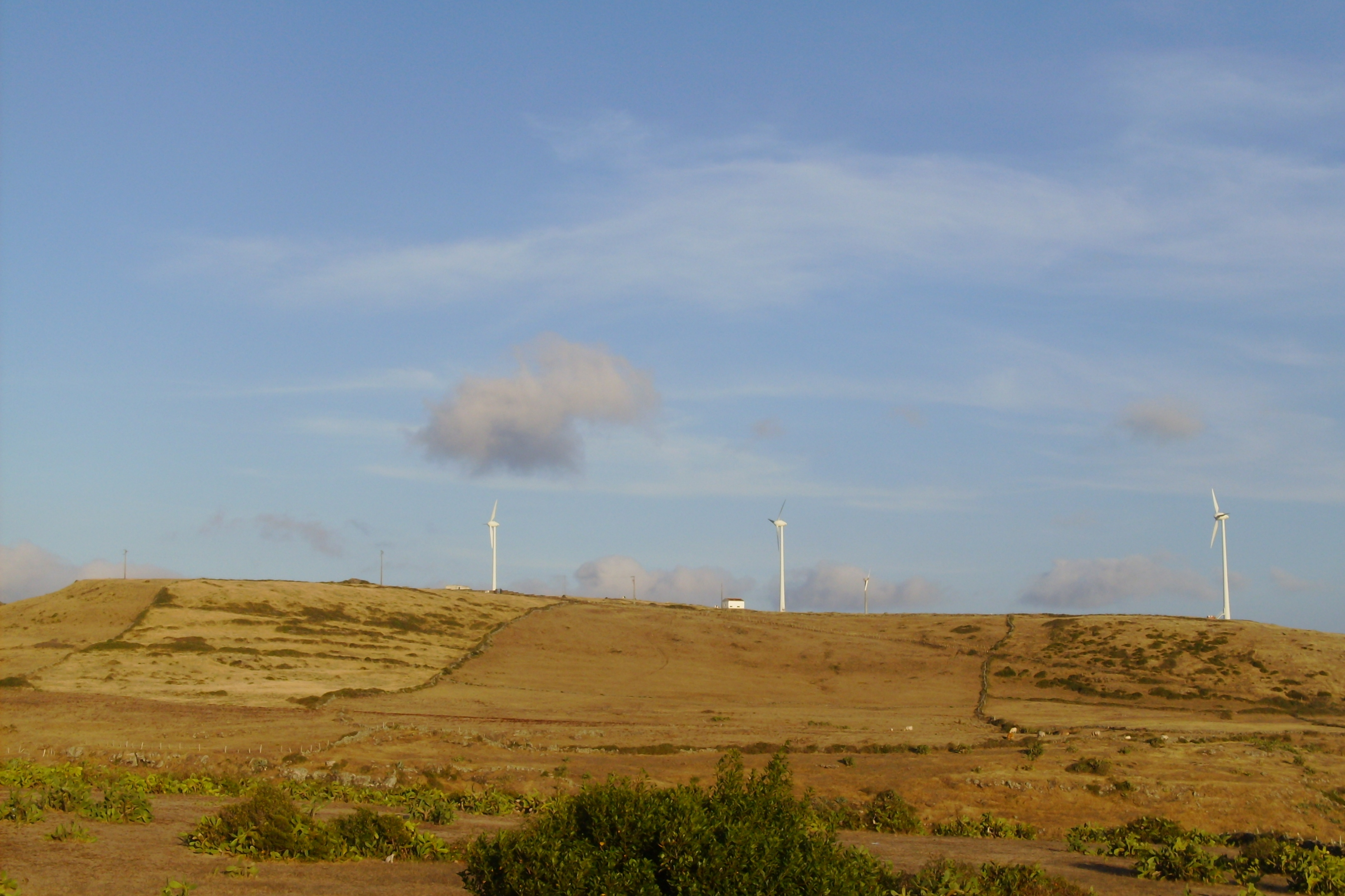
- The Wind-Generating Station in Vila do Porto, alongside the Natural Monument

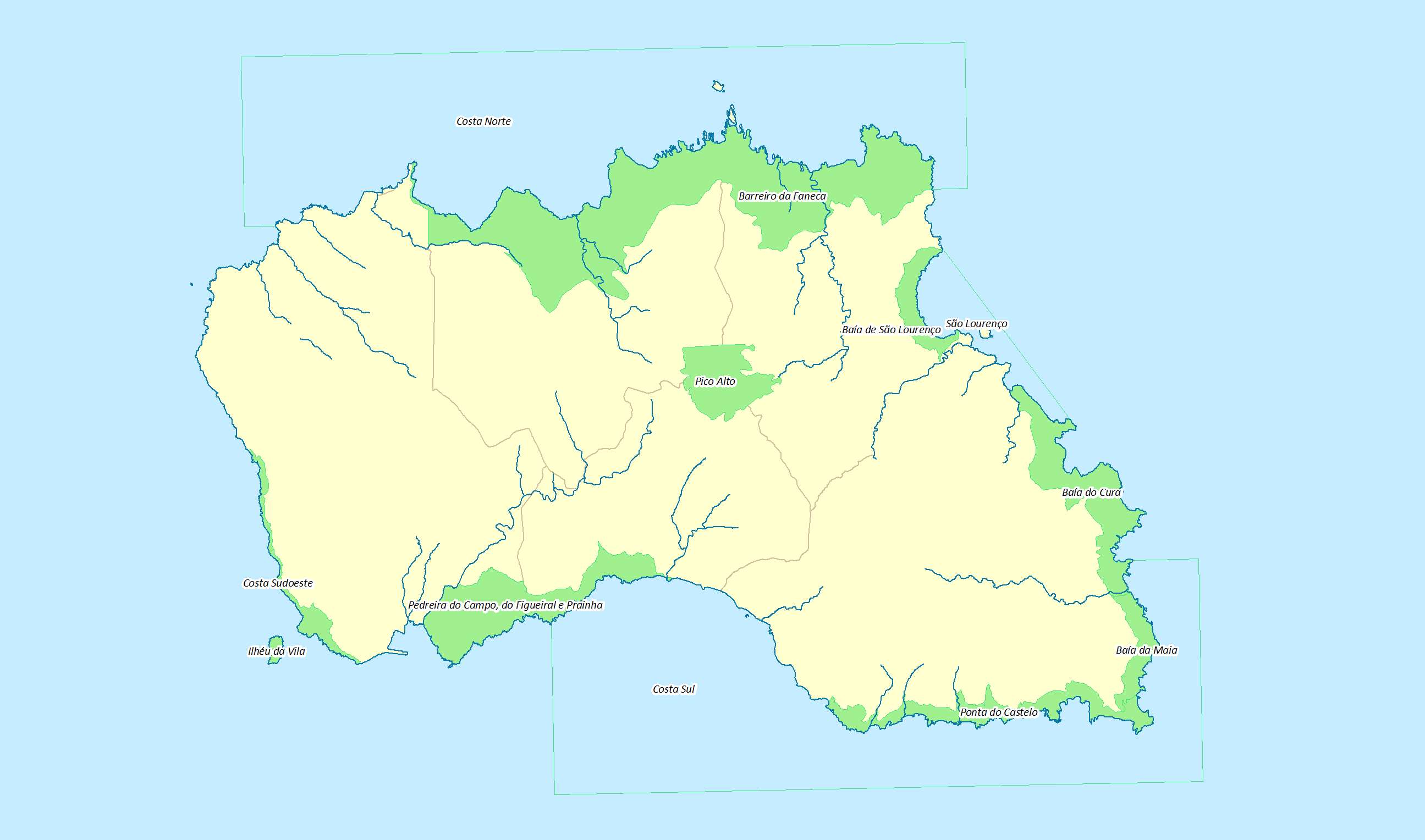
- Location within Nature Park of Santa Maria
- Location: Santa Maria, Eastern, Azores, Portugal
- Coordinates: 36°56′57.48″N 25°8′18.82″W
- Elevation: 100 m (330 ft)
- Established: Decreto Legislativo Regional 11/2004/A
- Named for: Pedreira do Campo, Portuguese for field rock quarry
- Operator: Secretário Regional do Ambiente e do Mar

The Regional Natural Monument of Pedreira do Campo (Portuguese: Monumento Natural Regional da Pedreira do Campo), which singularly translated means field quarry, is an area located west of Pico do Facho and Ponta do Figueiral, in the civil parish and municipality of Vila do Porto, on the island of Santa Maria in the Eastern Group of the Portuguese archipelago of the Azores. Along with other sites in Santa Maria, Pedreira do Campo is an area known for the discovery of oceanic fossils, which has allowed a specific assessment of the age of the island.

== History ==
The first references to this area came from the religious scholar and historian Gaspar Frutuoso who, writing in the 16th century, referred to calcareous sandstone deposits in a quarry near Figuerial, describing the sandstone as "...[having] seafood shells glued on [to] it".

Even after its modern re-discovery, by García-Talavera (in 1997), it attracted little attention, until the first international expedition Paleontology in Atlantic Islands (2002).

A workshop followed, entitled Marine Fossils of the Azores: Perspectives on the Future (presented by the Marine Biology section of the University of the Azores and the Portuguese Ordem dos Biólogos), which first suggested "a proposal for protection and classification of Pedreira do Campo as a Natural Regional Monument.

A technical report was published (M. Cahão, et al., 2003) that eventually laid the foundation for the Natural Monument designation. On 25 December 2002, a resolution-in-council by the Regional Government designated Pedreira do Campo as a Regional Natural Monument (Resolution 203/2002), which was approved as Decree 11/2004/A on 23 March 2004.

== Geography ==
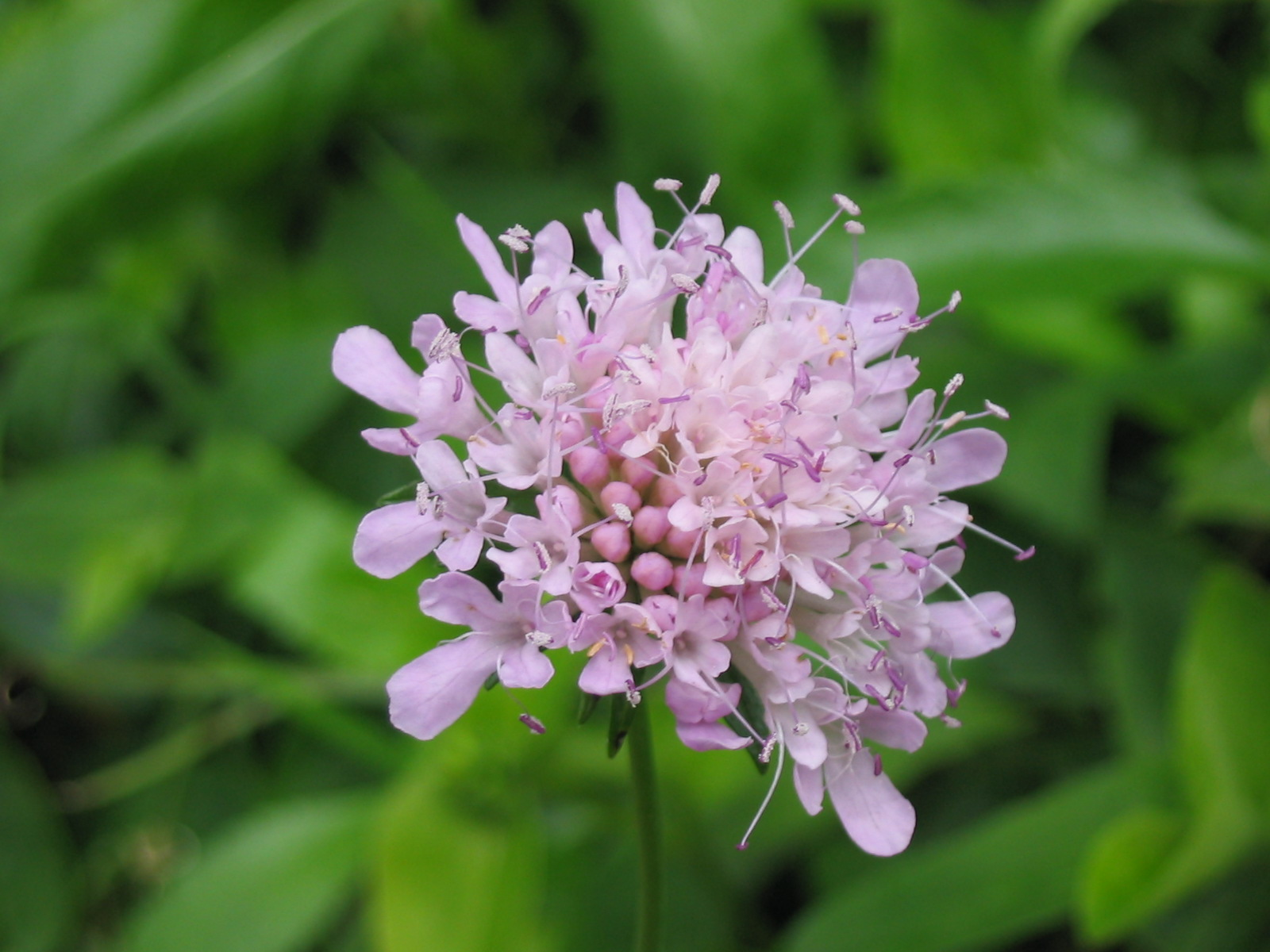
The flowering Scabiosa nitens found in the spaces of Figueiral

Pedreira do Campo is a 200 metres (660 ft) area, once associated with a rock quarrying, but since 2004 integrated into a protected area, that includes exposed sediments, extrusive magmatic and fossil deposits 20 metres (66 ft) deep and 120 to 130 metres (390–430 ft) above sea level.

The rock formation is delimited by a composite of sedimentary rock from the Touril Volcanic Complex and magmatic rocks of the Facho-Pico Alto Volcanic Complex. These units are estimated at five million years in age, from the Miocene to Pliocene epochs. The sedimentary deposits consist of horizontal layers intercalated into volcanic material of limestones, breccias, sandstones and conglomerates, as well as sub-aerial deposits.

It is one of the areas where abundant fossilized bicarbonate rocks have been discovered, including micro- and macro-fossils of algae, coral, bi-valve mollusks, gastropods, echinoderms, as well as bio-eroded sponges and bi-valve skeletons.

In terms of natural biological species, the area is known for Myrica faya (evergreen shrub), Myrtus communis (myrtle) and the endemic Scabiosa nitens. Migratory and marine bird species common to the area include the common buzzard (Buteo buteo rothschildi), the Columbian rock pigeon (Columbia livia atlantis), European greenfinch (Carduelis chloris aurantiiventris) and Atlantic canary (Serinus canaria).
