= Santo Espírito =

- Civil parish
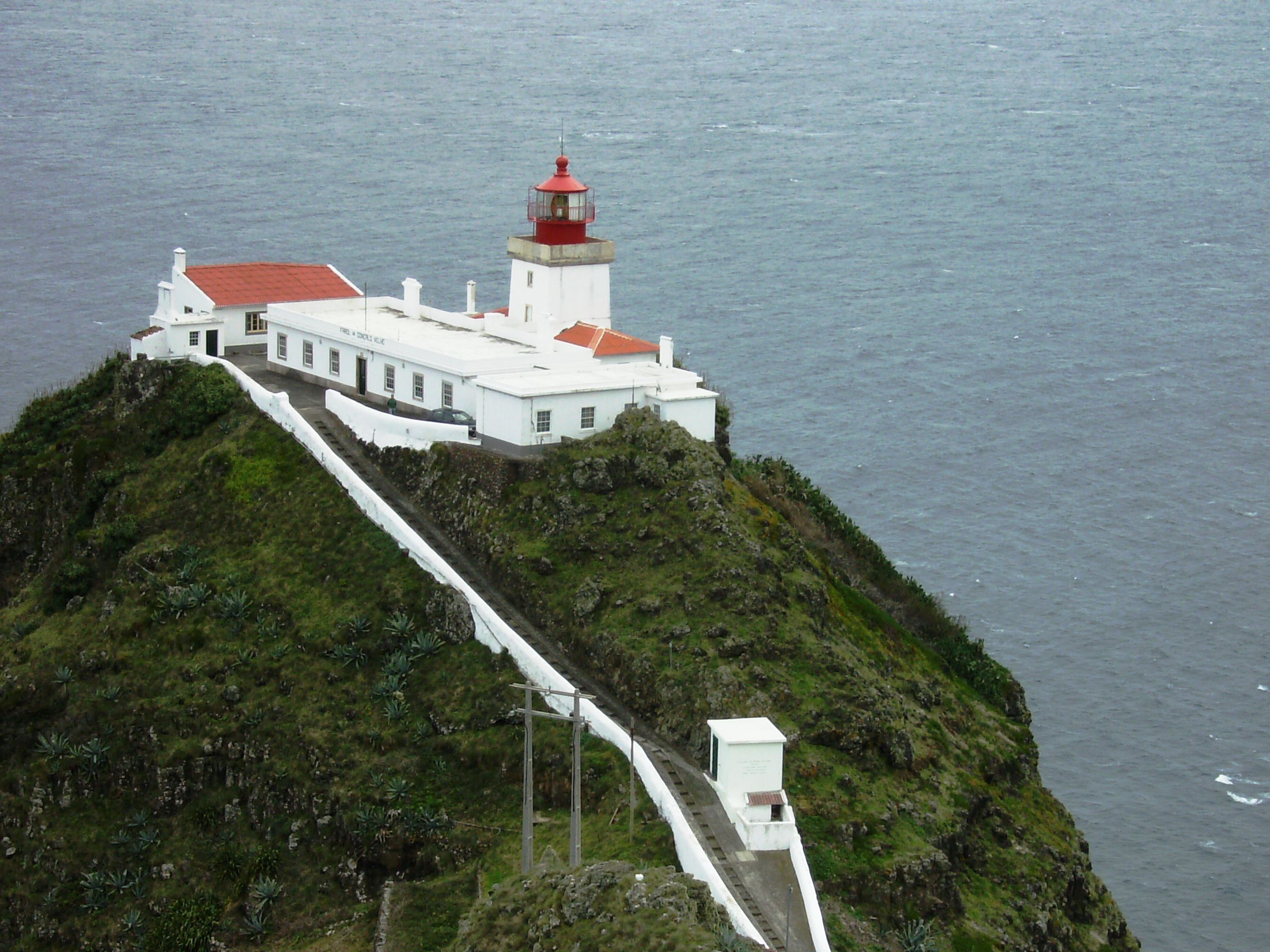
- The Gonçalo Velho Lighthouse, the landmark of the village of Maia, and the parish of Santo Espírito

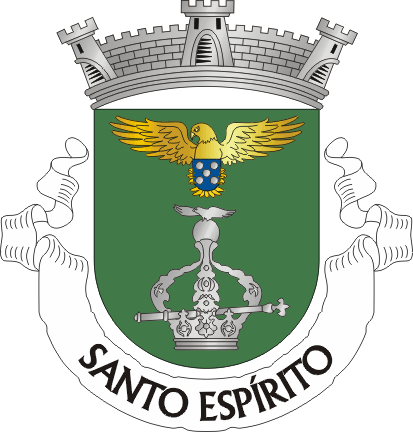
- Coat of arms

- Location of the civil parish of Santo Espírito within the municipality of Vila do Porto
- Coordinates: 36°57′21″N 25°2′29″W
- Country: Portugal
- Auton. region: Azores
- Island: Santa Maria
- Municipality: Vila do Porto

Area
  - Total: 26.68 km^{2} (10.30 sq mi)
- Elevation: 311 m (1,020 ft)

Population (2011)
  - Total: 588
  - Density: 22.0/km^{2} (57.1/sq mi)
- Time zone: UTC−01:00 (AZOT)
  - Summer (DST): UTC+00:00 (AZOST)
- Postal code: 9580-238
- Area code: 292
- Patron: Nossa Senhora da Purificação

Santo Espírito (Portuguese pronunciation: [ˈsɐ̃tu ɨʃˈpiɾitu]) is a Portuguese civil parish, located in the municipality of Vila do Porto, in the autonomous region of Azores. The population in 2011 was 588, in an area of 26.68 km².

== History ==
The parish was first referred in the chronicles of Gaspar Frutuoso:

"Leaving this fajã towards Norte, in the lands created by fields of marcela, because there were many there, they call it Santo Espírito, where they say the older [inhabitants] made their first mass to the Holy Spirit, when they entered there, and from there it became until this day the parish of Santo Espírito, becoming it later built, like today it is, in the invocation of the Purification of Our Lady, with losing its older name. And, because they did not find the field a convenient place for a settlement and town, they went to Santa Ana, like it was, where it stayed later in this place."

Monte Alverne later identified that this area was associated with Nossa Senhora da Purificação, in the place of Espírito Santo.

In the area of Malbusca, during the early settlement of the region, the colonists collected the fungus Roccella tinctoria which was exported to Flanders to produce woad, in an artisanal and risky process:

"Scattered along the cliffs of Malbusca, along the sea, very high and fearful, is collected urzela, which caused men, to risk their lives, inserted into baskets hanging by ropes tied to stakes tucked in the ground, over the rocks with one end to the basket and the other tied to a basket...there they were dropped by rope by hand until they arrive where they wanted to, and, when they had their bag full"

== Geography ==
The parish borders the Atlantic Ocean to the south and east, and it is the largest parish by area covering an expanse of hills, mounts and vegetation-rich escarpments. It is the third most populated in the municipality of Vila do Porto, but its rural communities are very dispersed. Until recently most communities were limited to dirt-road paths and trails to connect them. It is now served by the regional road network, circling the island, and most rural communities have paved roadways.

=== Ecoregions/Protected areas ===
Recreational Forest Reserve of Fontinhas

=== Human geography ===
The parish is made up of several scattered communities, that include: Almas, Azenha de Baixo, Azenha de Cima, Boavista, Cardal, Calheta, Cruz, Feteirinha, Fonte do Jordão, Glória, Lapa de Baixo, Lapa de Cima, Loural, Maia, Malbusca, Meio Moio, Panasco, Piedade, Santo António, Santo Espírito and Terra do Raposo.

== Architecture ==
=== Civic ===
- Lighthouse of Gonçalo Velho (Portuguese: Farol de Gonçalo Velho/Farol da Maia), located on Ponta do Castelo near the coastal town of Maia, the lighthouse began operation in 1927, but plans for this structure had been in the works since 1881;
- Lagar of Diogo Fernandes Faleiro (Portuguese: Lagar de Diogo Santos Faleiro), a medieval wine-press hewn from the rocks along the Ribeira do Aveiro in Maia;
- Municipal Washhouse of Santo António (Portuguese: Lavadouro municipal de Santo António)
- Museum of Santa Maria - originally an ethnographic and parochial intuition, it houses exhibits on history, culture and tradition; Santo Espírito.
- Whale Factory of Ponta do Castelo (Portuguese: Fábrica da Beleia da Ponta do Castelo), located at the point of Castelo, the abandoned/ruins was once the center of whaling in the southeast corner of Santa Maria;
- Windmill of Lapa (Portuguese: Moinho da Lapa), one of the few windmills that have survived, the stone base and wooden octagonal cupola are distinct features, although the sails are no longer available;
- Windmill of Terra do Raposo (Portuguese: Moinho da Lapa), the ruins of this windmill includes simply the stone base, since much of its structure was abandoned and fell into ruins;

=== Military ===
- Fort of Maia (Portuguese: Forte de Maia)

=== Religious ===
- Chapel of Nossa Senhora da Piedade - located in Malbusca, and constructed by the local community.
- Church of Nossa Senhora da Purificação (Portuguese: Igreja Paroquial do Santo Espírito/Igreja de Nossa Senhora da Purificação), also referred to as the Church of Candlemas, the principal temple of the parish dates from 1537, when it was dedicated and moved from the small hamlet of Santo António;
- Hermitage of Nossa Senhora da Boa Morte (Portuguese: Ermida de Nossa Senhora da Boa Morte), located in Panasco, in an enclosed/walled patio, this 19th century temple was reconstructed in 1886, following the storm effects (dated by an inscription);
- Hermitage of Nossa Senhora da Glória (Portuguese: Ermida de Nossa Senhora da Glória), situated in the hilltop community of Glória, the small chapel is marked by a sculpted stone retable which is a transposition of the Baroque tile in the "Nationalist"-style;
- Hermitage of Nossa Senhora da Piedade (Portuguese: Ermida de Nossa Senhora da Piedade)
- Hermitage of Nossa Senhora dos Prazeres (Portuguese: Ermida de Nossa Senhora dos Prazeres), this single-nave hermitage is the principal church of Maia and was established in 1685, by Manuel de Sousa Falcão and his wife, Cristina, but remodelled in 1997, through the contributions of a grupo of Luso-American and -Canadian emigrantes;
- Hermitage of Santo António (Portuguese: Ermida de Santo António), located in the hamlet of the same, the small 16th century church is encircled by other religious buildings (parochial hall and treatro), dedicated to Nossa Senhora da Purificação (Our Lady of the Purification)
- Império of the Holy Spirit of Nossa Senhora da Glória (Portuguese: Império do Espírito Santo de Nossa Senhora da Glória/Treatro do Espírito Santo de Nossa Senhora da Glória)
- Império of the Holy Spirit of Piedade (Portuguese: Império do Espírito Santo da Piedade/Treatro do Espírito Santo da Piedade e Copeira)
- Império of the Holy Spirit of Santo António (Portuguese: Império do Espírito Santo de Santo António/Treatro do Espírito Santo de Santo António e Copeira), in addition to this religious treatro, this includes a group of religious buildings constructed in the late 19th century, and used in religious celebrations throughout the decades;
