= Fort of São Brás (Vila do Porto) =

17th-century maritime fort on the Portuguese island of Santa Maria, Azores

- Forte de São Brás
- Santa Maria, Eastern, Azores in Portugal
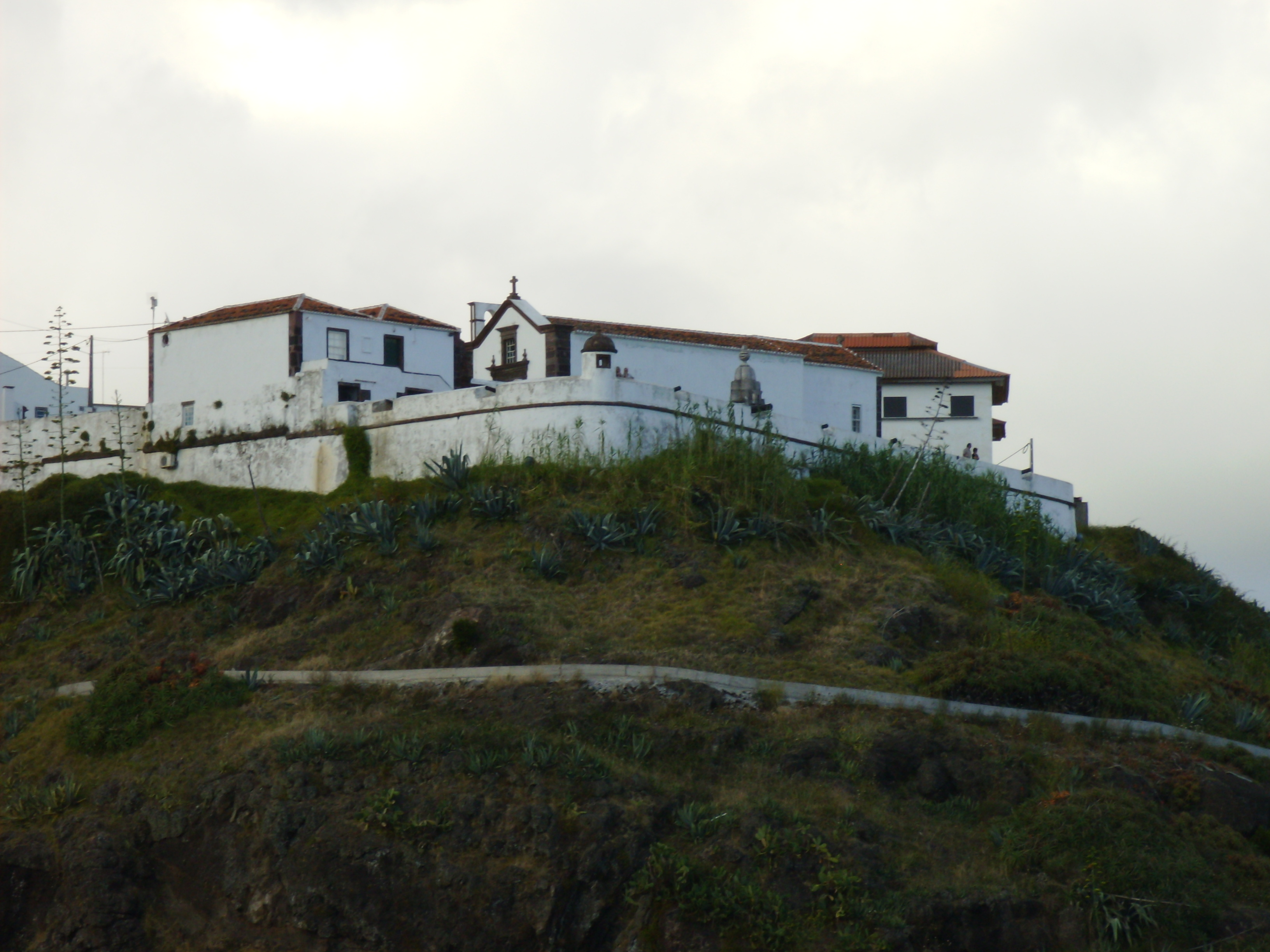
- A view of the fort as it is situated on the edge of the escarpment

Site information
- Type: Fort
- Owner: Portuguese Republic
- Operator: Câmara Municipal de Vila do Porto
- Open to the public: Public

Location
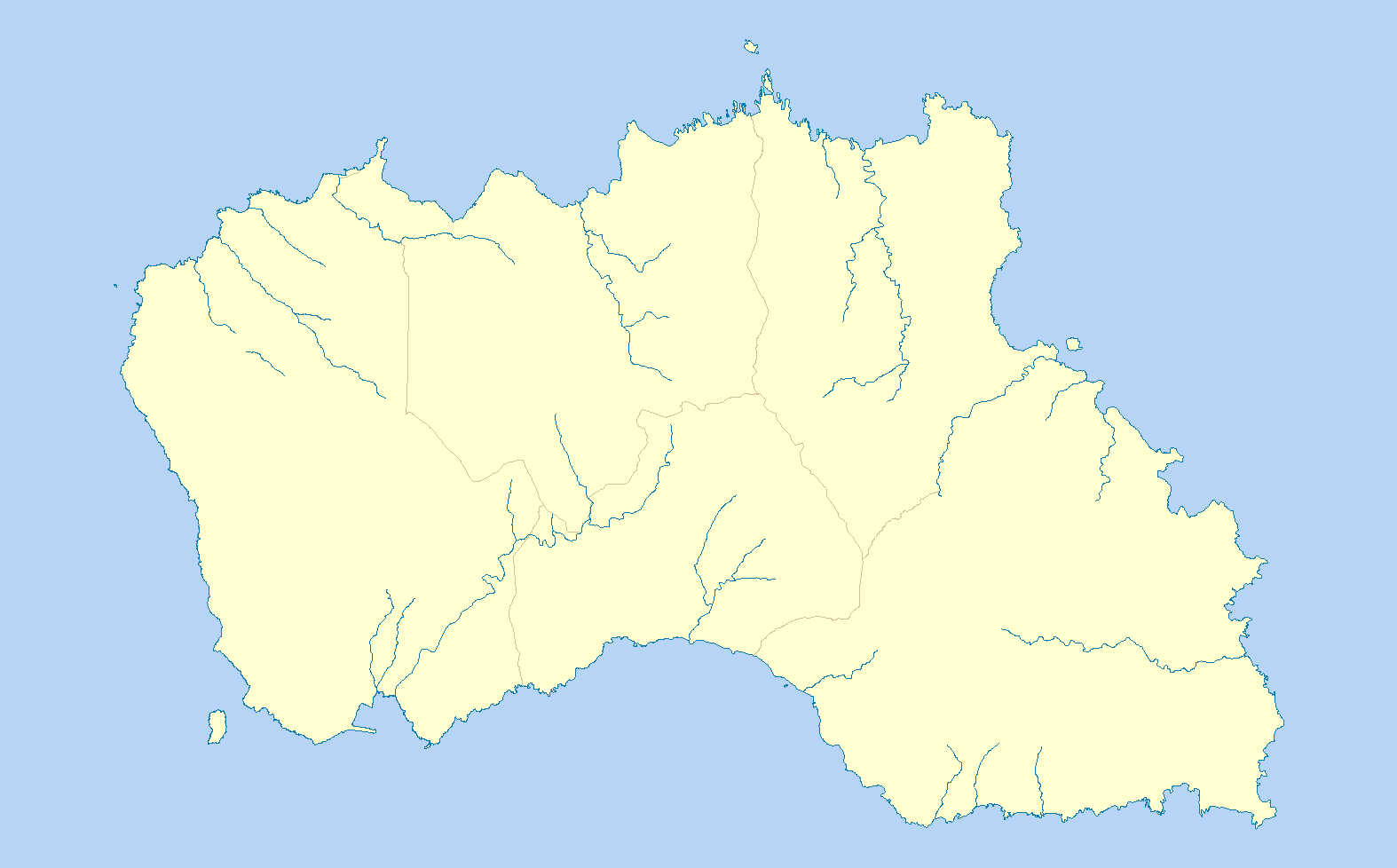
- Location of the fort on the island of Santa Maria
- Coordinates: 36°56′46.1″N 25°8′48.8″W

Site history
- Built: 17th century
- Materials: Stone masonry, Cornerstones, Wood, Iron, Tile

The Fort of São Brás (Portuguese: Forte de São Brás) is a 17th-century maritime fort situated on the southern cliffs of the civil parish of Vila do Porto, municipality of the same name, on the Portuguese island of Santa Maria, in the archipelago of the Azores.

== History ==
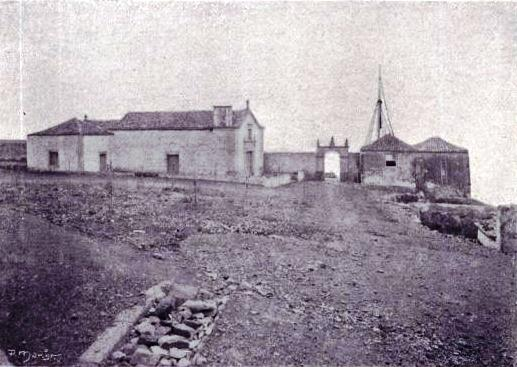
A 1903 view of the fort from the Largo Sousa e Silva

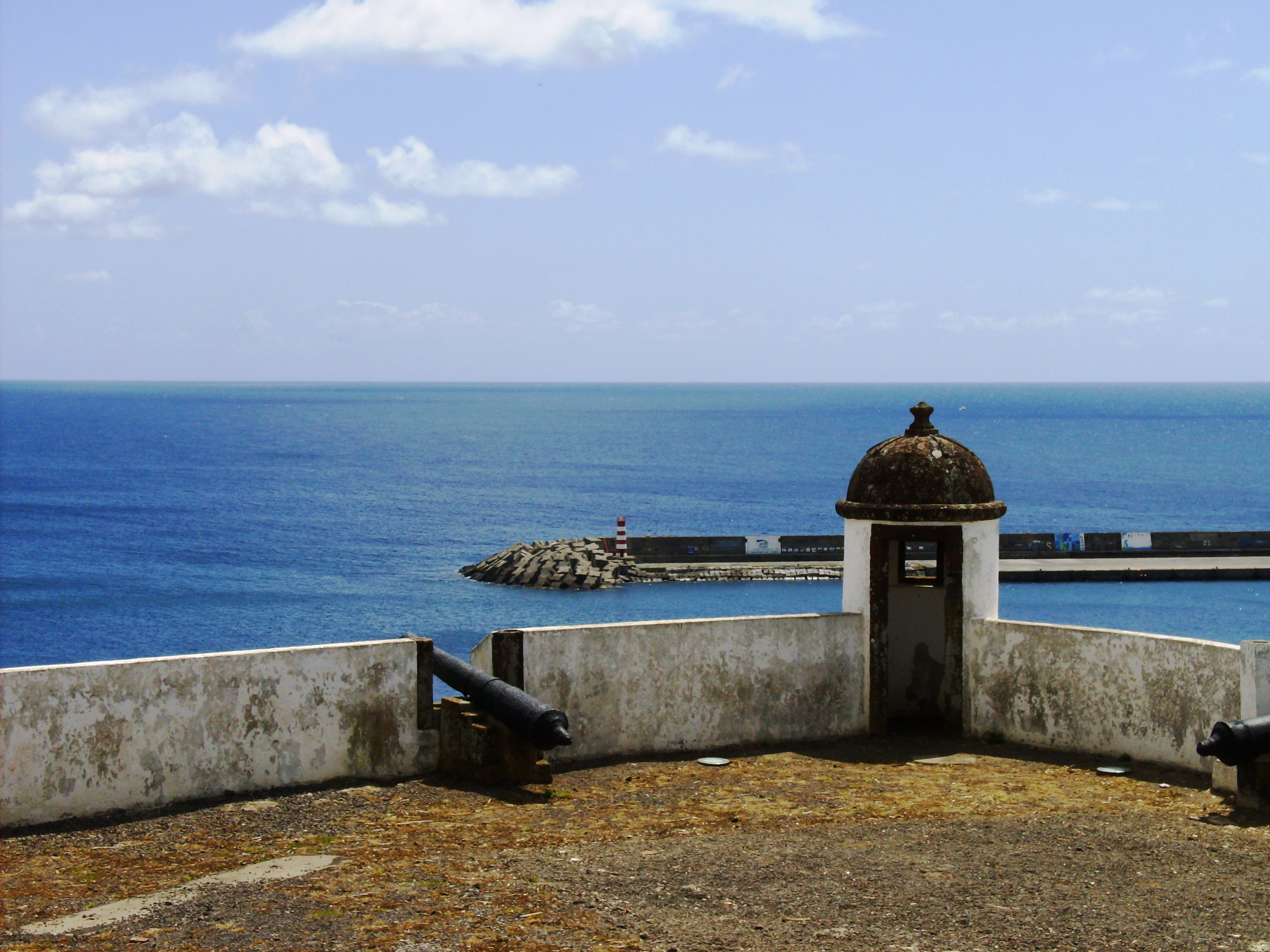
The bartizan looking out towards the harbour and marina

Between 1581 and 1582, there were different descriptions of incursions by pirates and privateers to the island of Santa Maria by Gaspar Frutuoso.

Sometime during the 17th century, it was likely that the fort was constructed, at a time when the Captain-major, João Falcão de Sousa, exercised his position as superintendent for the island's defense. A 1717 report described these defenses as:

The defense of the town, and all the island, it was little before, there was a league of ports that could be entered, and it was three times that the Mouros, English and French; but later they made in the Castle square, a fort with 14 pieces, and in front a fort with some; in front was another fort with a few pieces; in the town, two forts with its artillery; all this was not only under the direction of the Governor and the Donatary-Captain...but immediately an artillery captain with 30 artillerymen, in addition to Captain-major, officers and ordinance men..

In 1815, there is a reference to the fortification by José Carlos de Figueiredo:

Castle of São Brás at the town in the middle of the port had 14 pieces, being the best of the house of the Captain-major Francisco Barbosa de Sousa Coutinho, and those of the Castle are corrupt and little use.

On 28 February 1906, the fort was ceded to the municipal authority by the Secretaria de Guerra (War Secretariate). The walls of the fort were partially destroyed during the night, and its place a balustrade replaced the curtains.

The interior monument was inaugurated on 4 October 1929.

During the 1960s, the fort was reconstructed by municipal council. Completed four years later, the fort was re-inaugurated on 11 December 1966. It was at about this time that the movement to take control of the fort began in 1969; the council was interested in obtaining the right to the building of the old barracks, which was under the control of the Ministério das Finanças (Ministry of Finances), in order to demolish the structure for imperativos de urbanização ("urban imperatives"). The ruined structure was constituted by a two-story building, with an area of 87 square metres (940 ft^{2}), a small terrace house that was 58 square metres (620 ft^{2}) and a vaulted magazine in ruins, with 28 square metres (300 ft^{2}).

The fort was finally ceded to the municipal council in 1970, obliging it to maintain the buildings and the other constructions that existed onsite. on the 30 March 1970, the city solicited the DGEMN to repair the building, since the municipal council did not have the conditions to complete the task. In order to revitalize the space, in 1978, the barracks building was adapted to act as a teahouse, by the Direção dos Serviços dos Monumentos Nacionais. The project envisioned the maintenance of the structure, and resulted in the renovation of the interior, including the fenestrations in order to adapt to the new uses. But, the municipal council eventually ceded the site to the Clube Motard de Santa Maria (Santa Maria Motorcycle Club), following a lease agreement that established a term of 10 years.

== Architecture ==
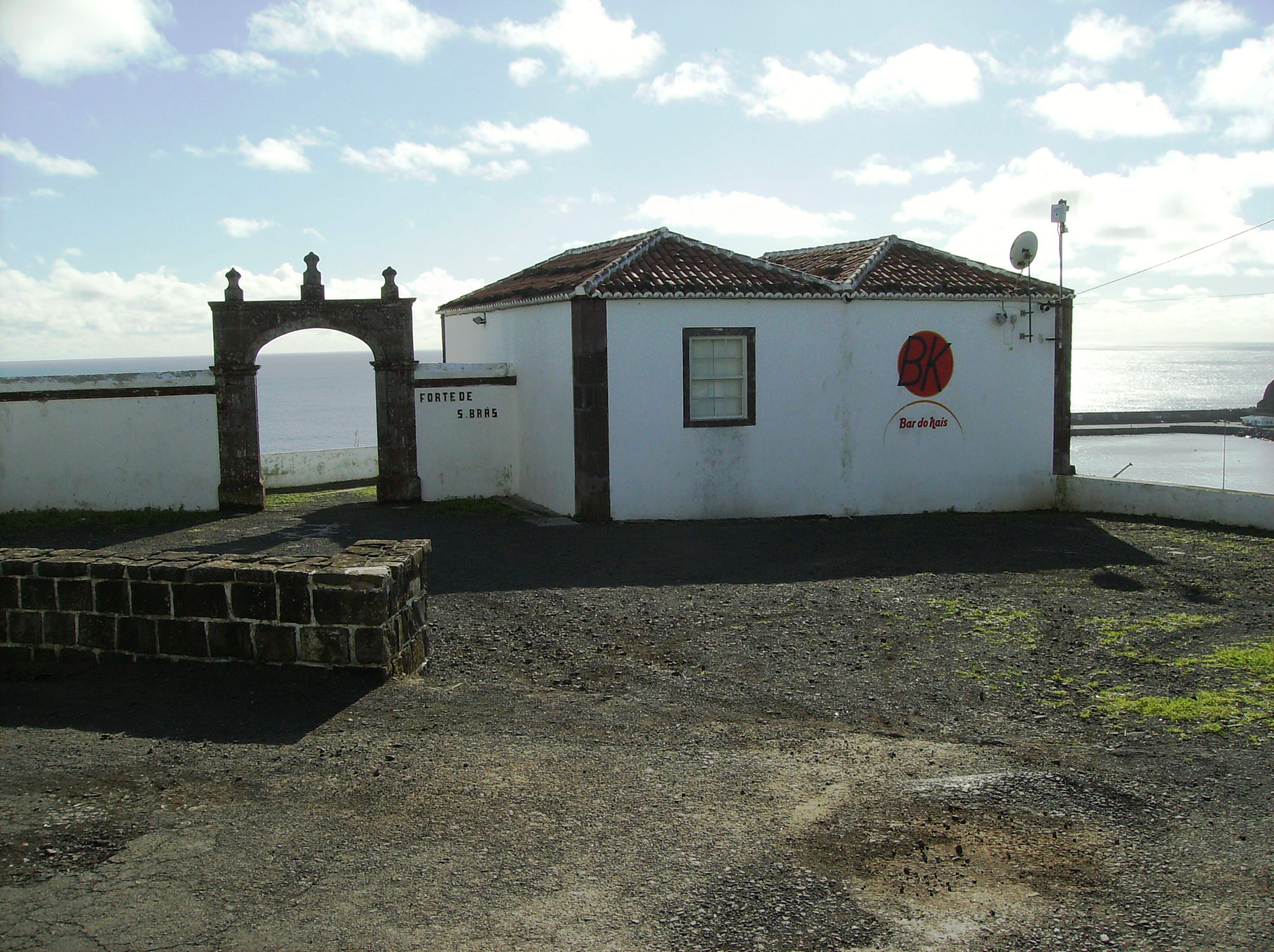
The main entrance portico with barracks and command building

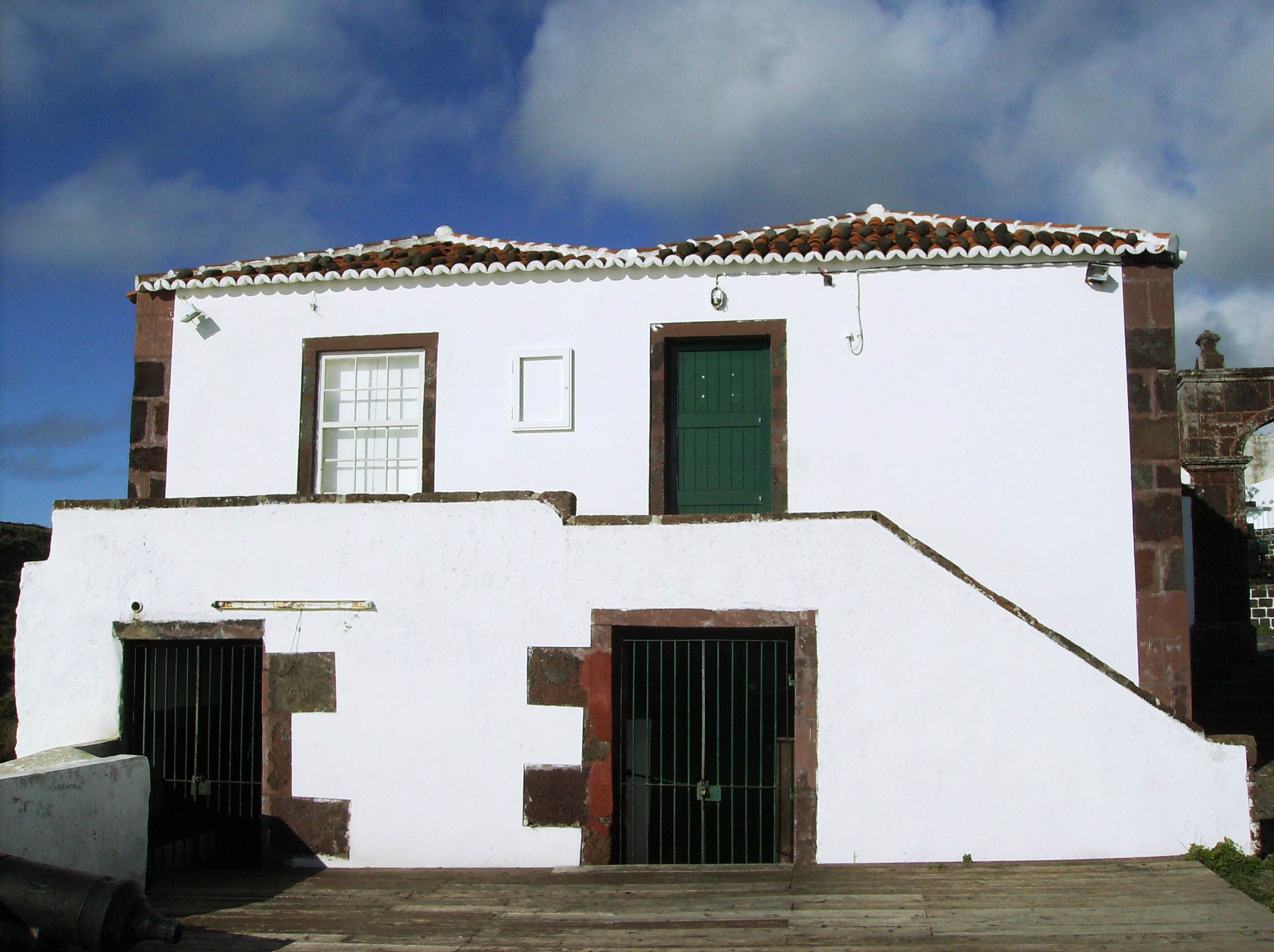
The barracks/command structure with gallows

The fort is situated at the extreme southern edge of the urban escarpment, perpendicular to the coast, from which extends the town, from a dominant position above the valley of São Francisco, creating a lookout. It is located on an escarpment that descends slightly from the northeast, forming a small square on various terraces lined with Portuguese pavement. The western edge is delimited by a small wall with bunks covered in pergola. At the centre of the fort is a monument in granite that pays homage to the crew of the minesweeper Augusto de Castilho. Below the main structure, and complementing this structure, were two, smaller redoubts, known as the Fortins das Areias. Surrounding the main walls are other buildings of architectural importance.

The maritime fort was constructed in the 17th century, and altered according to historical changes, forming a bastion adopted to the morphology and orientation of its base.

It is an irregular trapezoid oriented to the views of the sea, but only conserves a cylindrical bartizan from its period of defense. The structure is decorated with a cordon of merlon parapets and canon emplacements, except on the side oriented to land, where an arched portico is decorated with cornice. To the right of the fort's portico is a stone inscription in relief: FORTE DE / S. BRÁS. The walls oriented to the sea is the most conserved.

Addorsed to the northern wall is the Hermitage of Nossa Senhora da Conceição, which is taller than the main structure, while to the right of the entrance is the building for the former-command and barracks. This two-story building is integrated into the structure with a second-story balcony accessible from staircase.

The interior of the fort is lower than the exterior, paved and presenting a portico with various steps to complement the distance. The building used for the command and barracks is square, covered in double tile, with simple edge. The facades are singular or double-story, with the principal facade oriented towards the south. The two-story building, is plastered and painted in white with granite cornerstones, and a staircase that provides access to the second floor by way of balcony. The second floor includes framed door and window, with the doorway off of centre. On the main floor are two rectangular, framed doors under the balcony that are aligned with the same window-door combination on the second story. The left lateral facade, oriented towards the port is marked by a window, just over the parapet, while the lateral right is barren. To the rear is a guillotine-style window. The canon emplacements of the fort have nine artillery pieces, over wood bases. The bartizan can be accessed by square opening.
