= Eastern Group, Azores =

Eastern Group
- Island Group
- Interactive map of Eastern Group
- Coordinates: 36.9700°N 25.0697°W
- Country: Portugal
- Autonomous Region: Azores
- Region: Atlantic Ocean
- Subregion: Mid-Atlantic Ridge
- Position: Azores Plateau
- Time zone: UTC−1 (AZOT)
  - Summer (DST): AZOST (UTC)

The Eastern Group is one of the island groups of the Azores, Portugal. It comprises the islands of São Miguel and Santa Maria and the Formigas Islets.
