= Independent Air =

US charter carrier 1981–1990

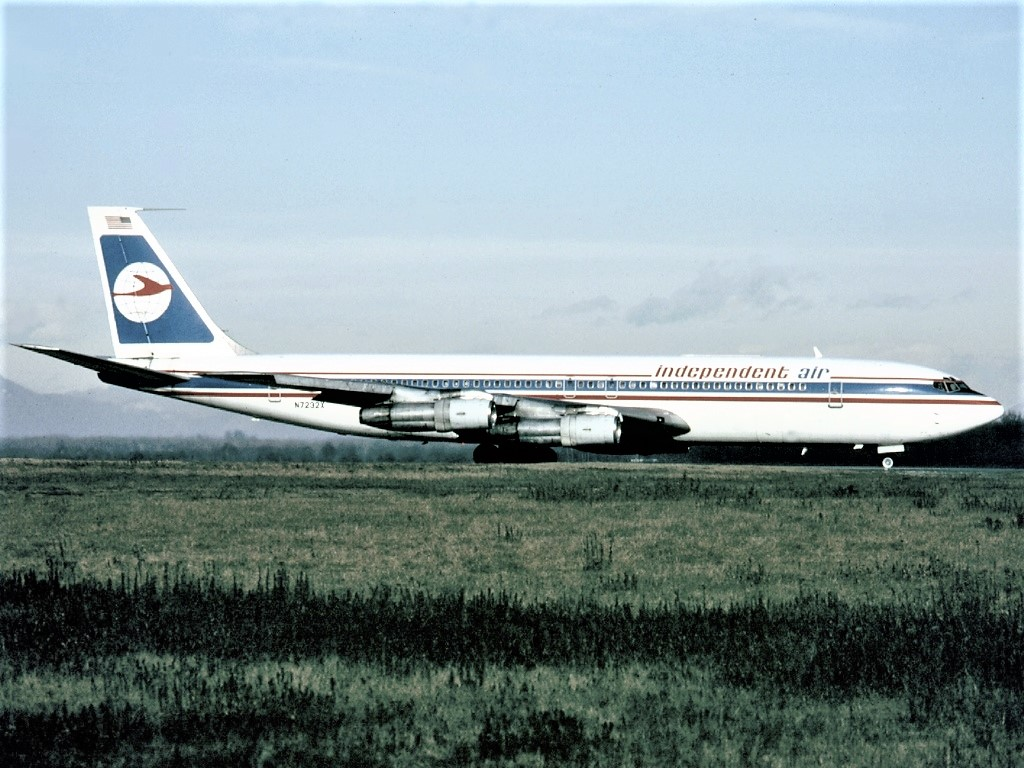
- 707 at Milan 1989
IATA	ICAO	Call sign
ID	IDN	SKYLARK
- Founded: April 3, 1970
- Commenced operations: 1981
- Ceased operations: November 1990
- Operating bases: Smyrna, Tennessee; Atlanta
- Fleet size: See Fleet
- Headquarters: Smyrna, Tennessee (1986–1990); Hapeville, Georgia (1970–1986)
- Key people: Alvin L. Pittman (CEO); Orien L. Dickerson (CFO)
- Founders: Harry R. Maugans; James "Hamp" H. Vason
- Employees: 60 (1989)

Atlanta Skylarks
- Founded: June 14, 1966
- Commenced operations: July 1966
- Ceased operations: 1981
- Operating bases: Atlanta
- Headquarters: Hapeville, Georgia
- Key people: Harry R. Maugans; James "Hamp" H. Vason
- Founders: Ed Blair; W. Lee Miller

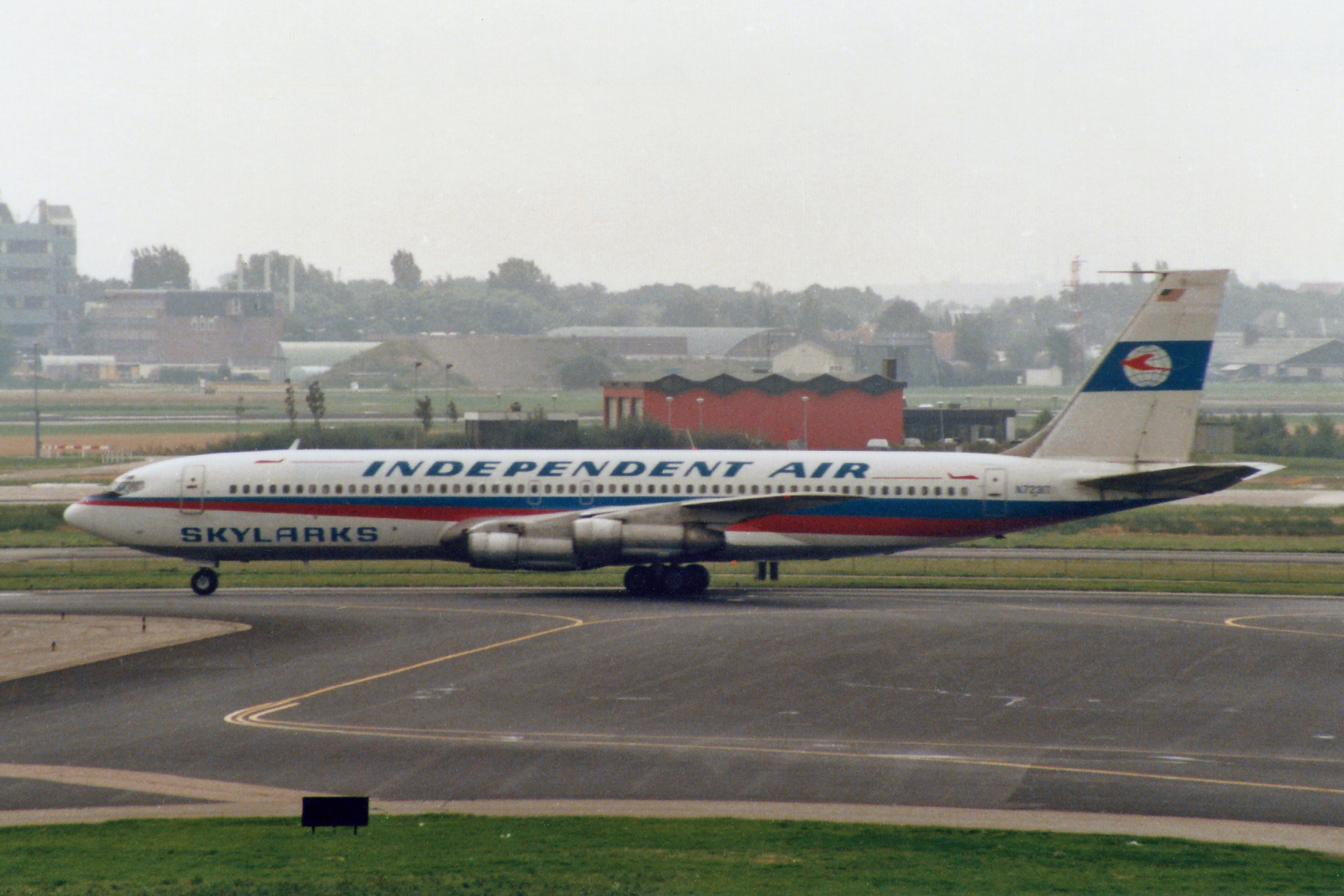
707 Amsterdam 1985. This was the aircraft that crashed in the Azores in 1989

Independent Air was a US airline that evolved from a company established in 1966 to operate the Atlanta Skylarks, an air travel club. Air travel clubs were a form of low-cost air transport that avoided regulation by the Civil Aeronautics Board (CAB), a now-defunct Federal agency that, at the time, provided tight economic regulation of almost all US air transport. Until 1981, the club itself held Federal Aviation Administration (FAA) authority to operate commercial aircraft, but Independent exercised club functions and owned the aircraft. In 1981, Independent Air gained its own FAA authority to operate large commercial aircraft, and from 1983 it was certificated as a charter airline.

Executives of defunct former supplemental air carrier Capitol Air acquired the airline in 1985 and raised money with an initial public offering through a penny stock broker later shut by the Securities Exchange Commission (SEC) for fraud. In 1986, the airline moved to Capitol's former headquarters in Smyrna, Tennessee. Independent was already losing substantial sums when, in early 1989, it suffered a high profile crash that killed 137 Italian tourists. The airline ceased operation the next year.

The airline's assets and certificate were bought by a new group and resuscitated as charter operator Airline of the Americas (AoA) in 1992. AoA played a role in the travel office controversy (aka "Travelgate") of the Clinton administration. In January 1993, the airline became UltrAir, which for six months unsuccessfully attempted high-end business-oriented scheduled service from Houston. The airline then tried conventional scheduled airline service before shutting down in July 1994.

Ultrair's assets and certificated in turn were bought and resuscitated in 1995 as Virginia-based Paradise Airways, renamed to Prestige Airways, which operated both charters and limited scheduled service from Flint, Michigan, and also to the United States Virgin Islands. Prestige ended service in April 1997.

== History ==
=== Atlanta Skylarks ===
The Atlanta Skylarks were an air travel club formed (and operating its first trip) in 1966, using a Douglas DC-7. While the club was non-profit, club functions were contracted to (and aircraft provided by) by profit-making Skylark Enterprises. In 1970, Skylark Enterprises became a wholly-owned subsidiary of a new company, controlled by Harry R. Maugans and James "Hamp" H. Vason—Independent Air. Despite the name, Independent at that time did not hold certification necessary to operate club aircraft. Instead the Skylarks held FAA certification directly (Federal Aviation Regulation Part 123, or FAR Part 123) created specifically for air travel clubs. In 1973, the club entered the jet age with a Boeing 720. In the mid-1970s, Skylarks flew about 40 trips a year, most of them a few days long, to the Caribbean, Mexico, Canada and northern South America. Once a quarter it flew a longer trip to Europe or South America. Skylarks was also briefly one of the few US operators of the Sud Aviation Caravelle, with two in the fleet in summer 1976, both exiting by 1978 (see External links for a photo). In 1981, following 1978 US airline deregulation, operational responsibility for flying Skylarks aircraft transferred to Independent Air after it acquired FAR Part 125 authority (allowing it operate large commercial aircraft not in common carriage).

=== Atlanta airline ===
After acquiring Part 125 authority, Independent Air broadened its scope beyond Skylarks to fly a limited number of charter flights and acquired a second Boeing 720. In 1983, Independent Air received charter authority from the Civil Aeronautics Board (CAB), completing its transition to an airline. It gained scheduled airline authority the next year. In 1985 the airline successfully avoided being shut by the FAA over noise standards that would otherwise have grounded the airline January 1 due to a shortage of hush kits for its Boeing 707s (it had already agreed to ground its Boeing 720s, for which no hush kits were available). It successfully argued to a Federal appeals court that the FAA had arbitrarily given waivers to some airlines that it had not, in similar circumstances, given to Independent.

Independent Air Financial Results^{(1)}
USD 000	1985	1986	1987	1988	1989	1990
Operating revenue	3,337	6,403	10,325	14,849	16,168	7,687
Op profit (loss)	(269)	1,134	(1,146)	(2,086)	(1,240)	(2,101)
Net profit (loss)	(48)	1,043	(2,942)	(2,182)	(1,199)	(2,050)
Op margin (%)	-8.1	17.7	-11.1	-14.0	-7.7	-27.3
(1) As filed with the Department of Transportation.

=== Pittman era ===
707 Paris August 1989. This aircraft, leased in from May 1989 to May 1990, replaced the Azores crash aircraft.

Alvin L. Pittman was a former president and long-time officer of Capitol Air, a former supplemental air carrier that ceased operation in 1984. He and another former Capitol executive, Orien L. Dickerson, along with silent partners, bought the carrier in April 1985 for $213,590, Pittman becoming CEO, Dickerson CFO. In October, Independent Air Holdings (which included a travel agency and the Skylarks management) executed an initial public offering through broker Stuart-James, selling 46% of Independent Air Holdings for proceeds of $2.8 million dollars (over $8.5 million in 2026 terms). The airline bought a Boeing 727-100 with the proceeds (sold in 1988—see External links for photo). Stuart-James was a highly aggressive penny stock promoter that shut down in 1990; an SEC attorney later said Stuart-James was a "factory for fraud." The company changed its headquarters from Hapeville, Georgia to Smyrna, Tennessee in 1986, occupying Capitol's old offices at Smyrna Airport.

On February 8, 1989, Independent Air suffered the crash of flight 1851, a Boeing 707 on approach to Santa Maria in the Azores, on a flight from Italy to the Dominican Republic, killing all 137 Italian tourists and the crew of seven on board (see Accidents). The Italian minister of transport, Giorgio Santuz, banned the airline from Italy, pending the accident report. Tour operators cancelled contracts. As the nearby table shows, the airline had already made significant losses in 1987 and 1988. The crash further increased pressure on the airline and by November 1990 it had ceased flying. During 1990, the airline, at the direction of CFO Orien Dickerson, improperly withdrew cash held in escrow accounts for future charter flights, for which Dickerson was later fined $5,000 by the US Department of Transportation, and banned from the airline industry for a year.

UltrAir Airline of the Americas
- 727-200 March 1993
IATA	ICAO	Call sign
RL	ULT; AOA	ULTRAIR; ALL AMERICAS
- Founded: June 21, 1991
- Commenced operations: June 1992 as Airline of the Americas; January 16, 1993 as UltrAir
- Ceased operations: July 13, 1994
- Operating bases: Smyrna, Tennessee
- Fleet size: See Fleet
- Destinations: See Destinations
- Headquarters: Houston, Texas; Smyrna, Tennessee
- Key people: Barney Kogen
- Founders: Charles P. Caudle; Gordon A. Cain
- Employees: 200 (July 1994)

=== Airline of the Americas/UltrAir ===
727-200 Miami December 1992

Charles P. Caudle was the former leader of pilots Pan Am inherited when it merged with National Airlines. Gordon A. Cain was a Houston executive who had engineered successful buyouts of petrochemical businesses. The two created Airline of the Americas (AoA) to acquire the assets of Independent Air, primarily a lease on a facility at Smyrna Airport, spare parts and its FAA certificate. AoA launched as a charter airline in June 1992, operating from the same Smyrna Airport office space previously occupied by Independent and Capitol. Certification came too late to get tour company business that summer, so it flew press charters for the administration of George H.W. Bush. In November 1992, Cain partnered with Barney Kogen, who had sold his travel agency business to American Express, to create UltrAir out of AoA, appealing to business travelers, with a large first class section and more legroom throughout the aircraft. Headquarters moved to Houston. Service launched on 16 January 1993 with service from Houston to New York and Los Angeles. Passengers earned miles on American Airlines' AAdvantage program.

Caudle left in February, his replacement in April, reportedly due to conflict with Kogen; by then UltrAir had dropped Los Angeles due to low fares. Starting in May, IRS investigators controversially investigated UltrAir as part of the White House travel office controversy; no wrongdoing was uncovered and Caudle was found to be due a $4,900 refund. The airline stopped scheduled service on July 25; the airline's June load factor was only 17%. Kogen gave up his investment days earlier. UltrAir's operating loss for the first six months of 1993 was $15.8 million on revenue of $9.8 million of which scheduled revenue was only $4.3 million.

The airline resumed scheduled service November 11, 1993, this time with an Wal-Mart-inspired everyday low price-strategy from New York Kennedy Airport to Florida. In May 1994 this expanded to include Birmingham and Mobile, Alabama. The airline discontinued operations again as of July 13, 1994.

Prestige Airways Paradise Airways
- 727-200 Miami March 1995
IATA	ICAO	Call sign
OI	PAI	SEA RAY
- Commenced operations: March 1995 as Paradise Airways; November 1995 as Prestige Airways
- Ceased operations: April 24, 1997
- Operating bases: Smyrna, Tennessee
- Fleet size: 3 Boeing 727-200s
- Destinations: See Destinations
- Parent company: NavCom Aviation
- Headquarters: Manassas, Virginia
- Founders: Elijah "Zeke" Jackson

=== Paradise Airways/Prestige Airways ===
Prestige 727-200 flying for Sunair, Fort Lauderdale January 1996

In October 1994, UltrAir assets were sold to NavCom Aviation, which owned a fixed base operator at Manassas, Virginia. NavCom launched the airline as Paradise Airways in March 1995. Paradise became Prestige in November. The airline flew both charters (including for tour operators and virtual airlines) and some limited scheduled service. For instance, Prestige flew for the extremely short-lived Sunair, a virtual airline flying from Cincinnati to Florida in December 1995/January 1996. It also flew for Jet Express, a virtual airline serving Myrtle Beach and Savannah from 1996. Scheduled service by Prestige included service to the Virgin Islands (December 1995 to January 1997) and from Flint, Michigan (September 1996 to February 1997). Operations ended 24 April 1997. NavCom was controlled by Elijah "Zeke" Jackson. His companies, including Prestige, on occasion did not pay employees and vendors. He was later sued by the United States Department of Labor for collecting but not depositing funds for employee 401(k) retirement accounts.

== Accidents ==
- 8 February 1989: Independent Air Flight 1851 inbound from Milan Bergamo Airport, crashed on approach to Santa Maria Airport in the Azores, Portugal, killing all 137 passengers and 7 crew on board in Portugal’s deadliest aviation accident. The passengers were all Italian tourists en-route to the Dominican Republic. Probable cause was failure of the crew to stay above the minimum altitude clearly marked on their charts. Contributing factors included poor/inaccurate radio communication on the part of air traffic control and the crew, failure to maintain a sterile cockpit, inaccurate flight plan, including an unauthorized route, apathetic attitude to altitude issues, including ignoring ground proximity warning system alarms, and an adequately trained and inexperienced crew.

== Destinations ==
=== UltrAir ===
January 1993:

- Houston
- Los Angeles
- New York

July 1994:

- Birmingham, Alabama
- Fort Lauderdale
- Miami
- Mobile, Alabama
- New York
- Orlando
- West Palm Beach

=== Prestige Airways ===
Virgin Islands service:

- Miami
- St Croix, US Virgin Islands
- St Thomas, US Virgin Islands
- Washington, DC

Flint, Michigan service:

- Chicago
- Flint, Michigan
- Orlando
- St Louis

== Fleet ==
=== Atlanta Skylarks ===
July 1966:

- 1 Douglas DC-7

December 1977:

- 1 Boeing 720
- 1 Sud Aviation Caravelle

=== Independent Air ===
March 1984:

- 2 Boeing 720
- 2 Boeing 707-300

March 1988:

- 2 Boeing 707-300
- 1 Boeing 727-100 leased out

=== Airline of the Americas/UltrAir ===
December 1992:

- 4 Boeing 727-200

December 1993:

- 5 Boeing 727-200

== See also ==
- List of defunct airlines of the United States
- Capitol Air
- Air travel club
