= Pico Alto (Santa Maria) =

Highest point of Santa Maria Island in the Azores

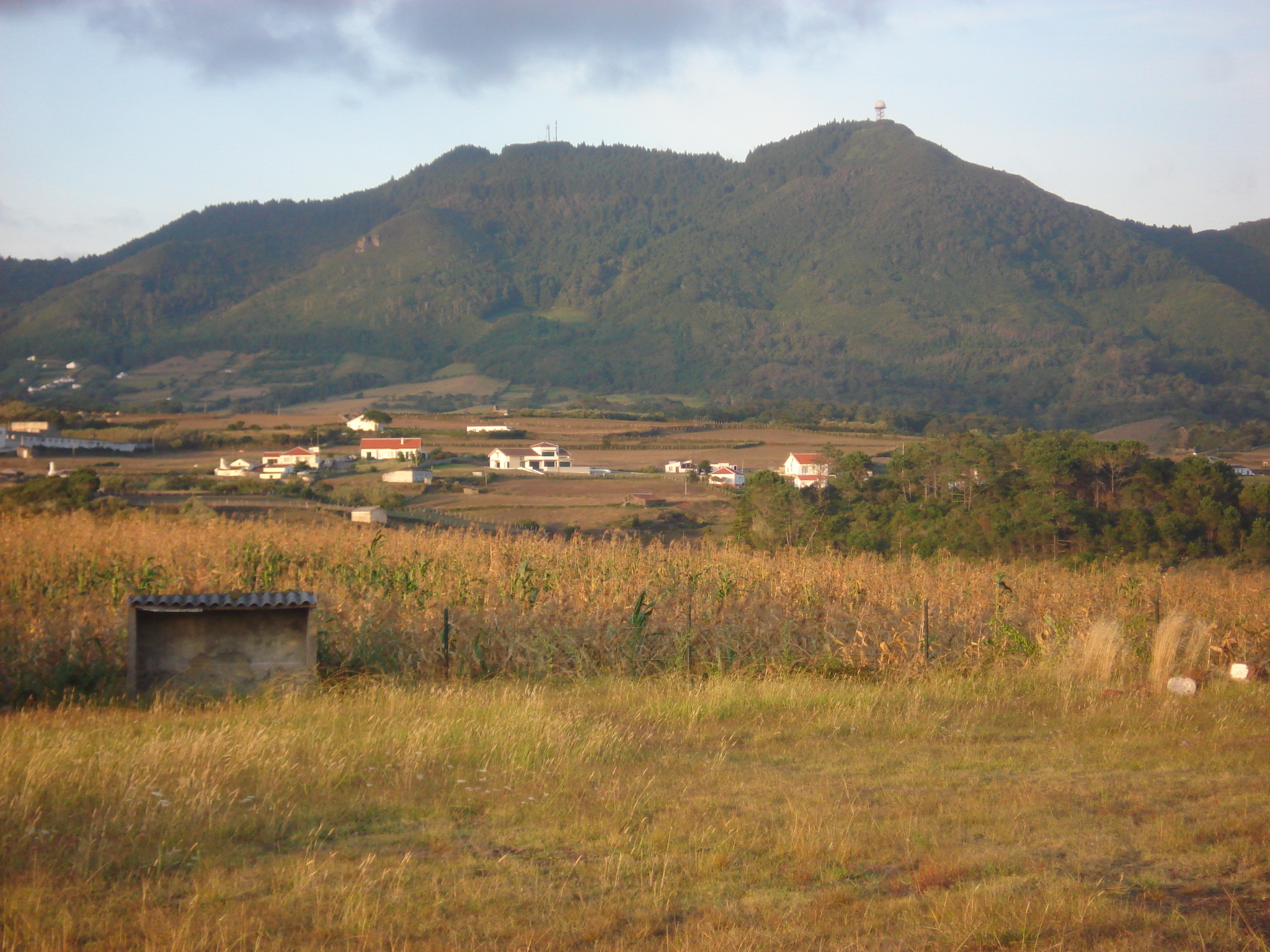
- A vista of the Pico Alto sierra that divides the parishes of São Pedro, Santo Espírito and Santa Bárbara

Highest point
- Elevation: 586.84 m (1,925.3 ft)
- Prominence: 586.84 m (1,925.3 ft)
- Parent peak: None - HP Santa Maria
- Coordinates: 36°58′59.74″N 25°5′26.17″W

Geography
- Location within Azores
- Location: Portugal Azores
- Parent range: Mid-Atlantic Ridge

Geology
- Rock age: 2-5 Million Years
- Mountain type: Pyroclastic cone

Climbing
- Easiest route: Scramble, Class 2; YDS Grade II

Pico Alto (literally high/tall peak) is a mountain which is the highest point, 586.84 metres (1,925.3 ft), on the island of Santa Maria, in the Portuguese archipelago of the Azores.

== History ==
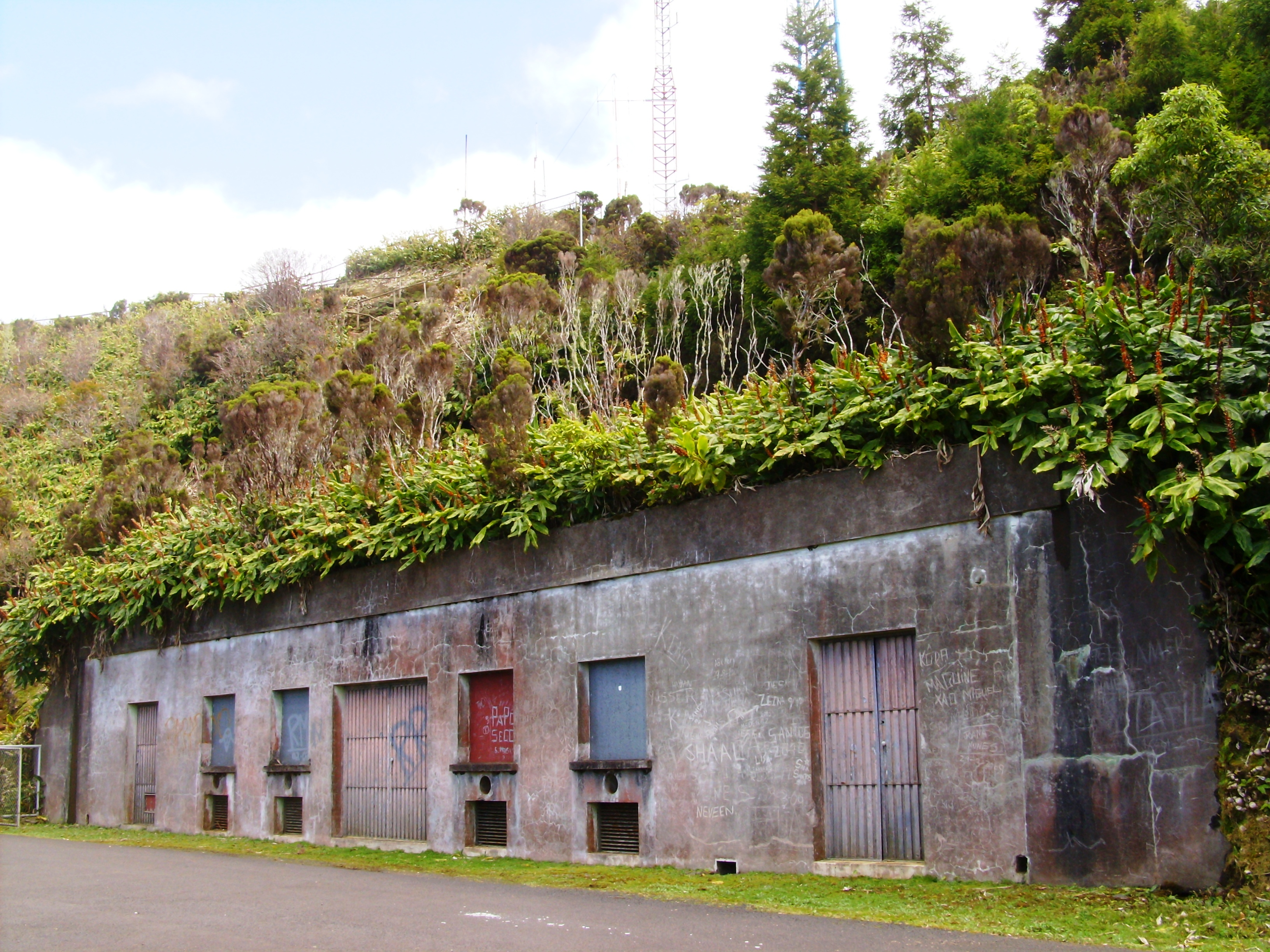
The pillboxes and military installations near the summit of Pico Alto used by stationed Portuguese military, now abandoned and in ruins

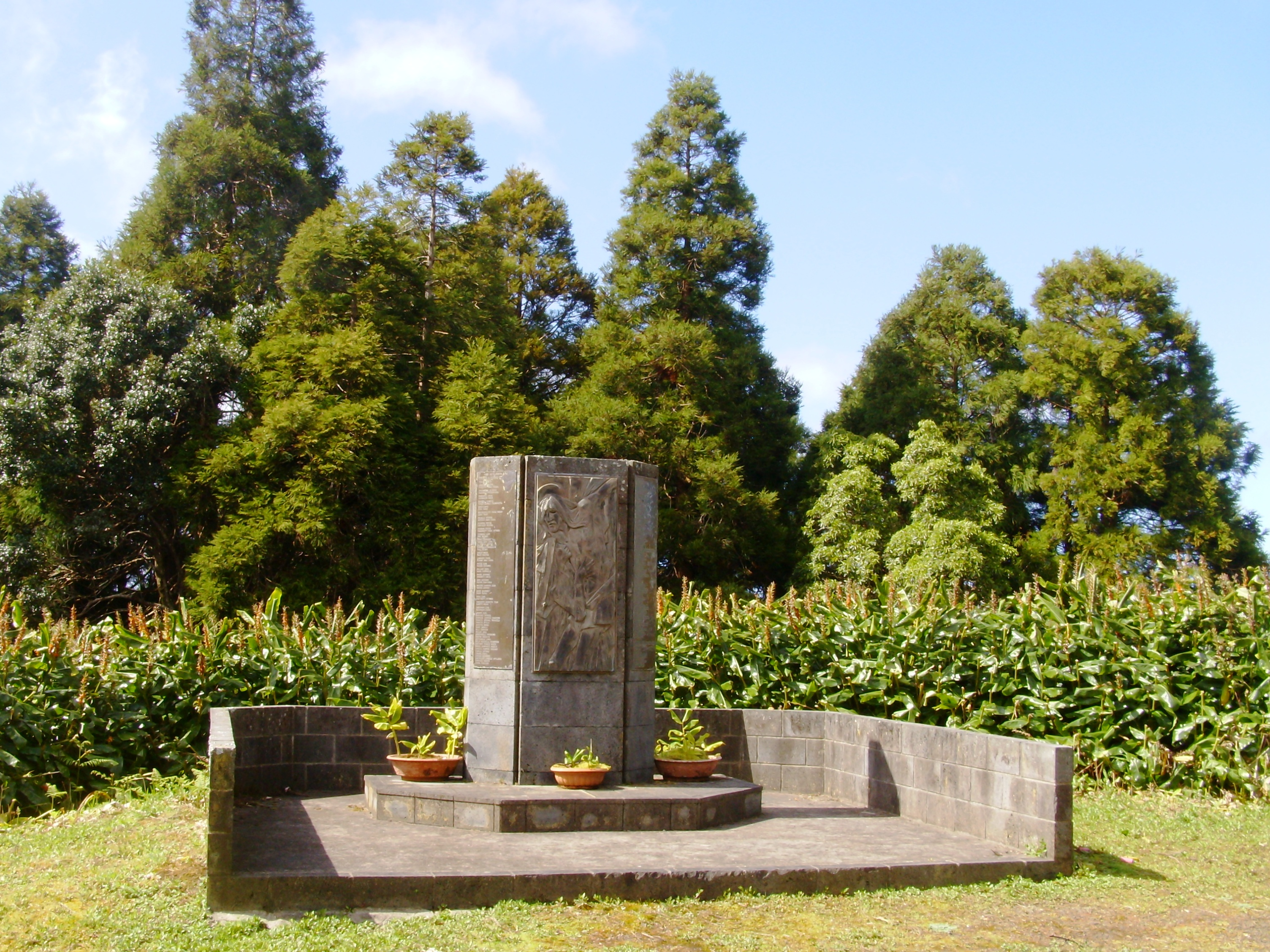
The memorial dedicated to the crash of Independent Air Flight 1851

The initial formation of the Facho-Pico Alto Volcanic Complex was a phase of intense volcanism, resulting from submarine eruptions as early as 5 million years ago, resulting in the formation of Pico do Facho and extensive pillow lavas. Remnants of these pillow lavas can be identified 180 metres (590 ft) above sea level, helping to increase the size of the island to roughly its current dimensions.

Following these eruptions, the land receded into the sea, resulting in a period of sub-aerial volcanism that resulted in the great relief in the complex, which is associated with lahars and erosional growth. The Pico Alto complex occurred continuously between 5 and 3 million years ago.

On 8 February 1989 Independent Air Flight 1851 struck Pico Alto due to pilot error killing all 144 on board in the worst air crash in Portuguese history.

On 5 December 2012, the Secretaria Regional dos Recursos Naturais (Regional Directorate for Natural Resources) announced that they were beginning a reforestation program for Pico Alto; the forest of Santa Maria was considered "more identitical to those original [pre-colonization] forests of the Azores". Using seed from the Forest Service of Nordeste, the operational team of the Nature Park of Santa Maria began planting endemic species of Heather (Vaccinium cylindraceum), Azores Laurel (Laurus azorica) and other plants. This followed a program of eliminating invasive plants species that began in 2011, under the Plano Regional de Controle de Flora Invasora em Áreas Sensíveis program.

== Geography ==
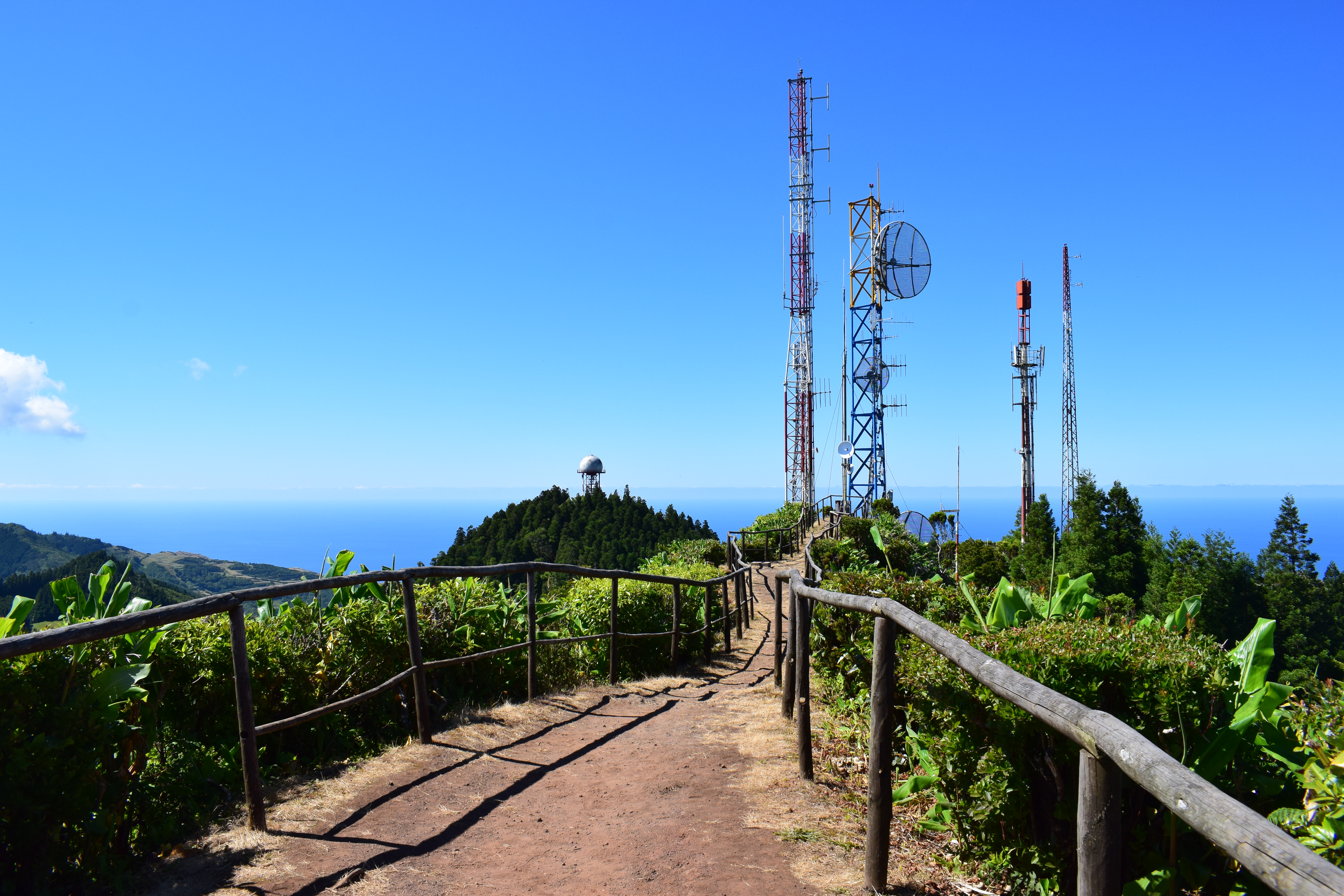
The summit of Pico Alto is the location of communication antennas, as well as a lookout open to the public

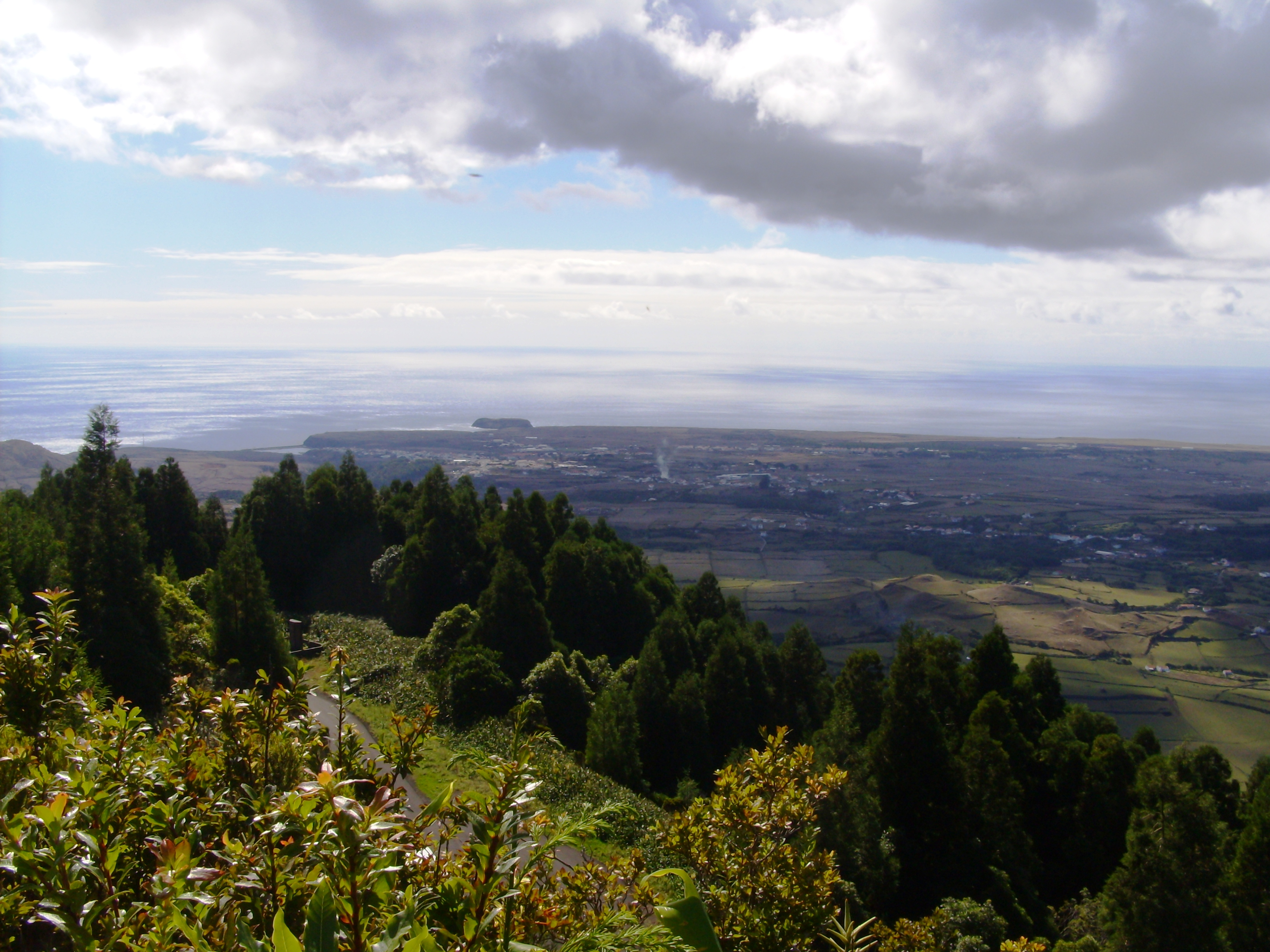
A view from Pico Alto to the western coast of the island and Vila do Porto

The island of Santa Maria was created from successive layers of volcanic materials and marine sediments stratified over the course of a formative period, of which Pico Alto was created between 2 and 5 million years ago. The oldest island in the Azores, many of the original geological structures and volcanic morphology has been totally or partially eroded, dismantled and difficult to detect in the landscape of the island. Pico Alto being the largest structure within the Facho-Pico Alto Volcanic Complex has persisted throughout the island's geological history.

Geomorphologically, Pico Alto is part of a sierra localized in the central part of the island, consisting of a mountainous north–south alignment dividing the a rugged eastern coast from the western plain that rarely exceeds 277 metres (909 ft) in elevation. The eastern or mountainous zone, is covered almost completely in vegetation, and highlighted by the peaks of Pico Alto, Cavacas 492 metres (1,614 ft), and Caldeiras 484 metres (1,588 ft).

The Facho-Pico Alto Volcanic Complex was constructed in three phases: the first related to stratovolcanic unit of Facho, and then, two lateral centres associated with Pico Alto. The volcanism that originated Facho was submarine in nature, with two visible centres positioned in the southern part of the island: Pico do Facho and a second pyroclastic cone situated 500 metres (1,600 ft) west of Rocha Alta (the remains of its chamber still visible along the coast). Both these emission centre were responsible for pyroclastic and submarine lava flows. In the northern coast, there was likely another eruptive centre associated within this volcanic unit, but erosion makes its localization difficult. Following a long period of volcanic activity, conditions changed, allowing the deposition of sediments and formation of beaches. These deposits were constructed of conglomerates of stone and marine fossils, such as in Pedraque-Pica.

Pico Alto, resulted from fissural eruption developing in the eastern corner of the island. The inferior layer developed in the area of the central sierra and contributed to the growth of the eastern part of the island. These were sub-aerial eruptions, and the volcanic structures were submersed, simultaneously occurring an important submarine eruption, with evidence located in the areas from the Bay of Tagarete until Ponta da Malbusca, and along the eastern coast. The unique eruptive centre of this activity was in Pico Maloás.

The second, or superior eruption, covers a great part of the eastern part of the island, resulting from sub-aerial and submarine eruptions. The periods of sub-aerial activity resulted in extensive outcroppings, lava fields, layered pyroclasts, dykes and numerous seams (approximately 230), that originated in the central relief of Cavacas until Caldeira, and passing through Pico Alto, while submarine lava flows extended into the sea in the Bay of São Lourenço, Maia and Ponta do Castelo.

Both series of fissual eruptions are separated by terrestrial and marine sediments. The first constituted exclusively by alluvium deposits and surface runoff, including lahars, in the form of conglomerates and loamy coarse particulates, such as those in Bom Despacho Velho and Alto do Poente, as well as between Feteiras and Poço Grande. Marine sediments are confined to the older beaches, such as Ponta dos Matos, Ponta da Rocha or Ponta do Castelo. Some, like in Ponta do Castelo, are composed of calcrious fossils dating to the Pliocene.
