= Santa Maria Natural Park =

Protected area of the island of Santa Maria

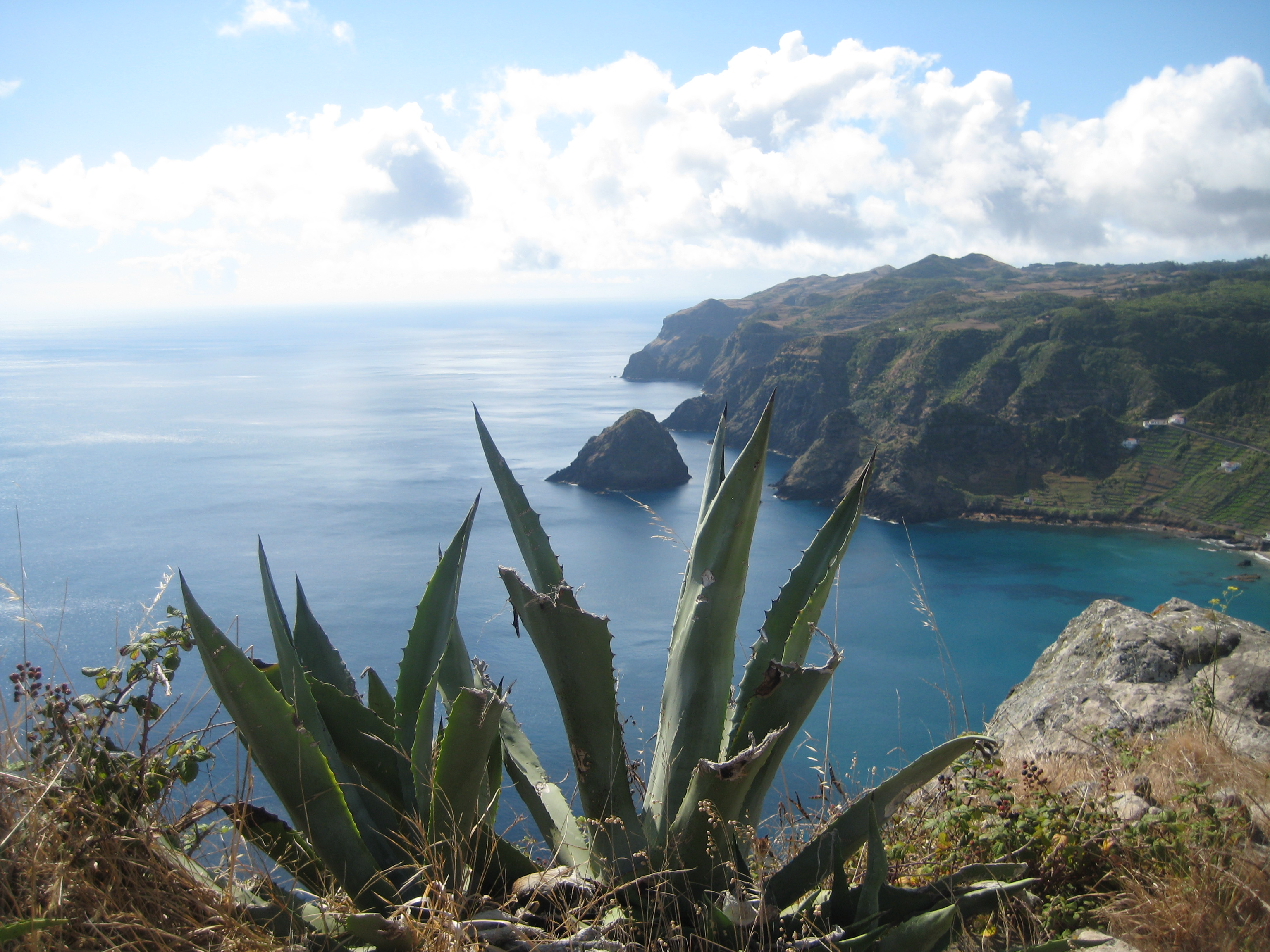
- A view of São Lourenço Bay

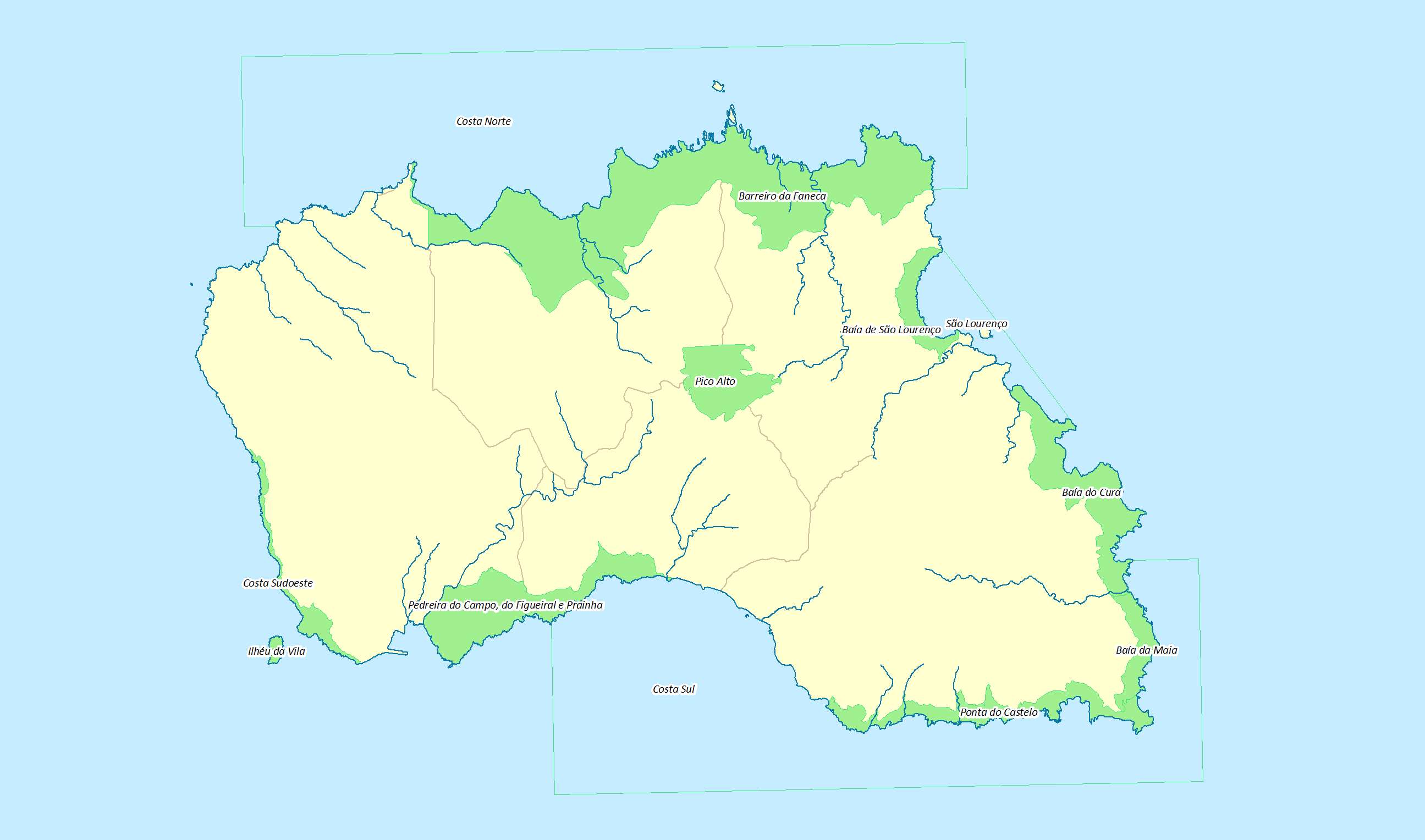
- The location of the various protected areas that constitute the Santa Maria Nature Park
- Location: Vila do Porto, Santa Maria Island, Central, Azores, Portugal
- Established: Decreto Legislativo Regional n.º 46/2008/A
- Named for: Santa Maria Island
- Operator: Secretário Regional do Ambiente e do Mar
- Website: Santa Maria Natural Park

Santa Maria Natural Park (Portuguese: Parque Natural de Santa Maria) is a protected area on Santa Maria Island in the Azores. The park was created by the Secretaria Regional do Ambiente e do Mar (Regional Secretariate for the Environment and Oceans), of the Autonomous Regional Government of the Azores to better manage the protected areas of Santa Maria Island. Several natural landscapes were preserved and their use conditioned in order to foster conservation and support endemic flora and fauna species, as well as provide communal forms of recreation and nature interpretation.

== History ==
On the 7 November 2008, the Regional Government legislated the creation (under Regional Legislative Decree 47/2008/A) of the Parque Natural da Ilha de Santa Maria (Santa Maria Island Natural Park) in order to coordinate and administer the island's thirteen protected areas as one.

== Geography ==
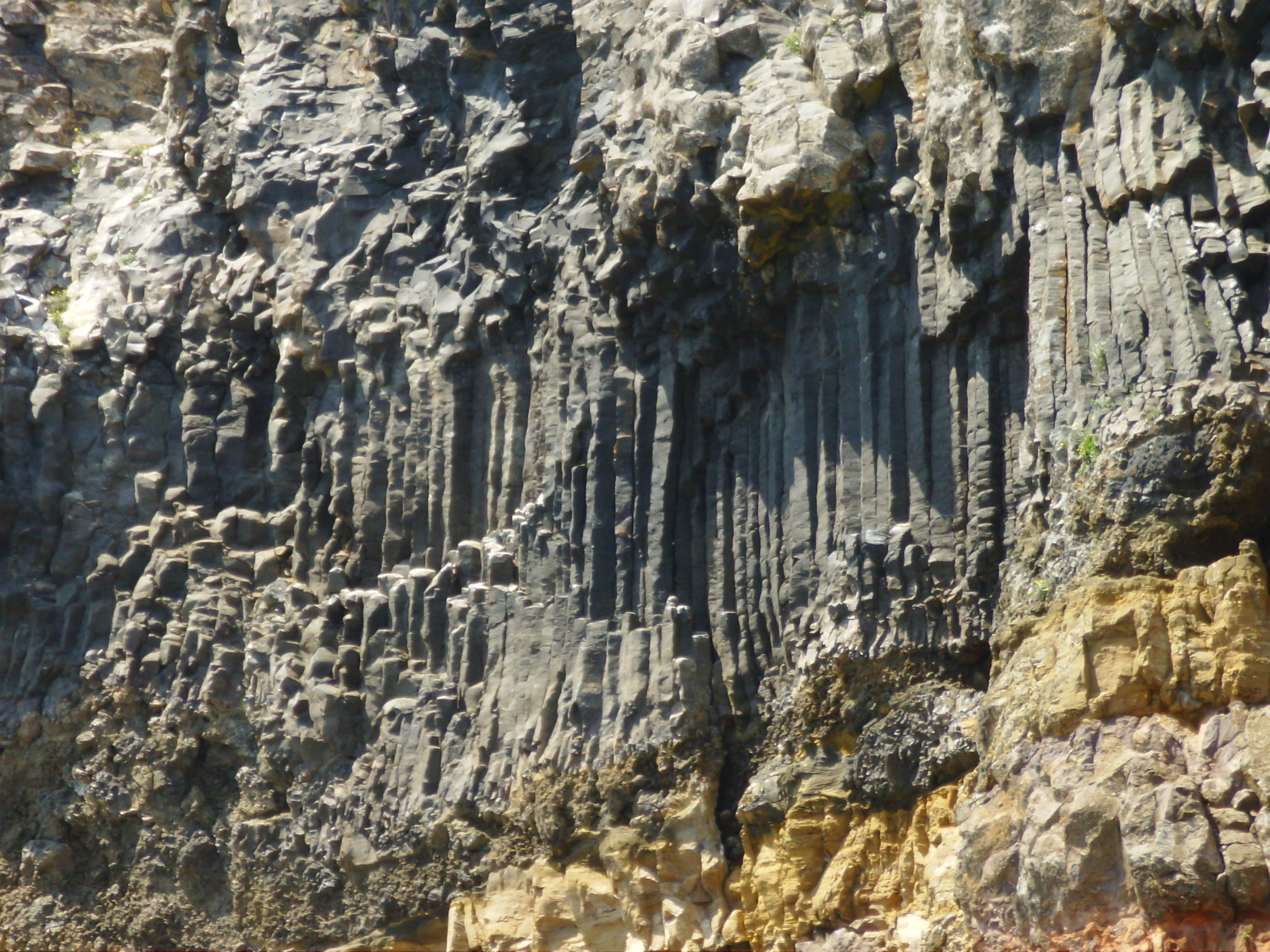
A geological formation in the region of Figuerial

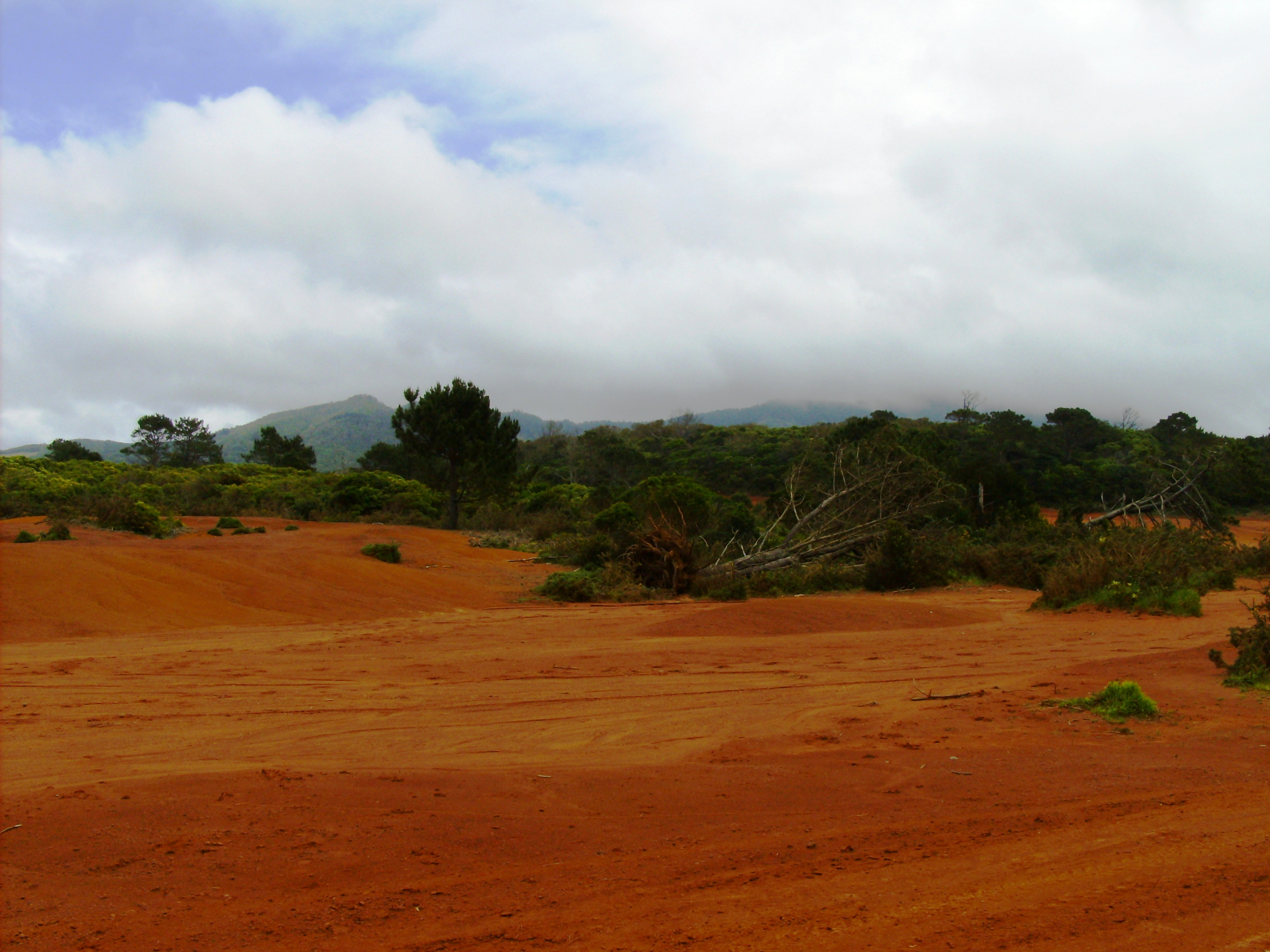
The red desert of Barreiro da Faneca in the civil parish of São Pedro

Nature Reserves

- [SMA01] Nature Reserve of the Formigas Islets (Portuguese: Reserva Natural dos Ilhéus das Formigas)
- [SMA02] Nature Reserve of the Vila Islet (Portuguese: Reserva Natural do Ilhéu da Vila)

Natural Monuments

- [SMA03] Natural Monument of Pedreira do Campo, Figueiral and Prainha (Portuguese: Monumento Natural da Pedreira do Campo, do Figueiral e Prainha)

Protected Areas for the Management of Habitats and Coast Species

- [SMA04] Protected Area of the Southwest Coast (Portuguese: Área Protegida para a Gestão de Habitats ou Espécies da Costa Sudoeste)
- [SMA05] Protected Area of Ponta do Castelo (Portuguese: Área Protegida para a Gestão de Habitats ou Espécies da Ponta do Castelo)
- [SMA06] Protected Area of Baía do Cura (Portuguese: Área Protegida para a Gestão de Habitats ou Espécies da Baía do Cura)
- [SMA07] Protected Area of Pico Alto (Portuguese: Área Protegida para a Gestão de Habitats ou Espécies do Pico Alto)

Protected Landscapes

- [SMA08] Protected Landscape of Barreiro da Faneca (Portuguese: Área de Paisagem Protegida do Barreiro da Faneca)
- [SMA09] Protected Landscape of Baía de São Lourenço (Portuguese: Área de Paisagem Protegida da Baía de São Lourenço)
- [SMA10] Protected Landscape of Baía da Maia (Portuguese: Área de Paisagem Protegida da Baía da Maia)

Protected Areas for the Management of Resources

- [SMA11] Protected Resource Areas of Baía de São Lourenço (Portuguese: Área Protegida de Gestão de Recursos da Baía de São Lourenço)
- [SMA12] Protected Resource Areas of the North Coast (Portuguese: Área Protegida de Gestão de Recursos da Costa Norte)
- [SMA13] Protected Resource Areas of the Southern Coast (Portuguese: Área Protegida de Gestão de Recursos da Costa Sul)

In addition, the Direcção Regional dos Recursos Florestais (Regional Directorate for Forest Resources), which is responsible for the administration of forest resources and parks on the island, is responsible for the maintenance and promotion of the following forest reserves, within the designated spaces:

- Recreational Forest Reserve of Fontinhas (Portuguese: Reserva Florestal de Recreio das Fontinhas)
- Recreational Forest Reserve of Valverde (Portuguese: Reserva Florestal de Recreio de Valverde)
- Recreational Forest Reserve of Mata do Alto (Portuguese: Reserva Florestal de Recreio da Mata do Alto)
