= Independent Air Flight 1851 =

1989 aviation accident in Portugal

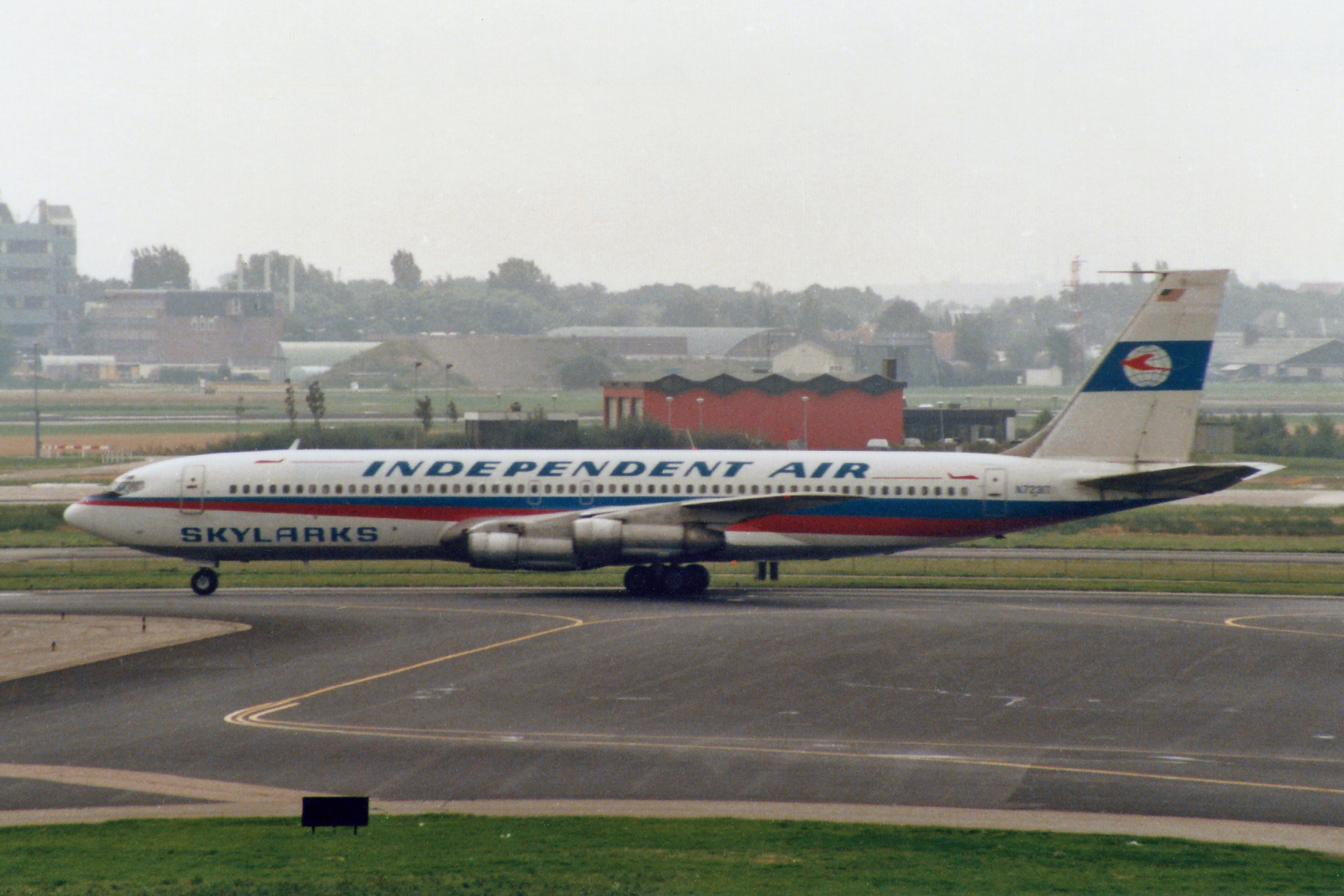
- N7231T, the aircraft involved in the accident, seen in 1985 with a previous livery

Accident
- Date: 8 February 1989
- Summary: Controlled flight into terrain during descent
- Site: Pico Alto, Santa Maria Island, Azores, Portugal; 36.981475°N 25.091008°W

Aircraft
- Aircraft type: Boeing 707-331B
- Operator: Independent Air on behalf of Dominair
- IATA flight No.: ID1851 / YU1851
- ICAO flight No.: IDN1851
- Call sign: INDEPENDENT AIR 1851
- Registration: N7231T
- Flight origin: Orio al Serio Airport, Bergamo, Italy
- Stopover: Santa Maria Airport, Santa Maria, Azores, Portugal
- Destination: Punta Cana International Airport, Dominican Republic
- Occupants: 144
- Passengers: 137
- Crew: 7
- Fatalities: 144
- Survivors: 0

On 8 February 1989, Independent Air Flight 1851, a Boeing 707 on an American charter flight from Bergamo, Italy, to Punta Cana, Dominican Republic, struck Pico Alto while on approach to Santa Maria Airport in the Azores for a scheduled stopover. The aircraft was destroyed, with the loss of all 144 people on board, resulting in the deadliest plane crash in Portugal's history. All of the passengers on board were Italian and all of the crew were Americans. The crash is also known as "The disaster of the Azores" (Italian: Il disastro delle Azzorre).

== Background ==
=== Aircraft ===
The aircraft involved was a 21-year-old Boeing 707-331B registered as N7231T with serial number 19572 and line number 687. It was manufactured in 1968, and first flew on 22 March. It was previously operated by Trans World Airlines (TWA) and was one of two 707s in Independent Air's fleet.

=== Crew ===
The flight crew consisted of Captain Douglas Leon Daugherty (41), First Officer Samuel "Sammy" Adcock (36), and Flight Engineer Jorge Gonzalez (34).

Captain Daugherty had 7,766 flight hours, including 766 hours on the Boeing 707 (278 as a first officer and 488 hours as a captain). He also had 2,259 hours on the Boeing 727 (347 hours as a first officer and 1,912 hours as a captain).

First Officer Adcock had a total of 3,764 flight hours, though only 64 of them were on the Boeing 707. Flight Engineer Gonzalez had a total of 6,756 flying hours, including 1,056 hours on the Boeing 707. He also had 2,888 hours on the Boeing 727 and 2,823 hours on the Lockheed C-5 Galaxy.

One of the flight attendants on board, Yvette Murray (26), was engaged to Captain Daugherty, planning to get married in May.

== Sequence of events ==
=== Preceding events ===
The flight crew previously flew on 3 February to Montego Bay, Jamaica. On 4 February they flew to Fort Worth, Texas, then to Denver, Colorado. On 5 February, the crew returned to Montego Bay, where they received their assignment for flight 1851 from Milan, Italy, to Punta Cana, Dominican Republic, with a scheduled stopover in Santa Maria, Azores, Portugal. On 7 February, after a flight of 10 hours and 40 minutes, the crew arrived in Genoa, Italy, having to divert from Milan Malpensa Airport due to poor weather. The crew arrived in Bergamo three hours later, which was located near the planned departure airport. The crew spent the next 46 hours in a hotel, their activities being unknown. However, in the early morning of 9 February, a witness stated that everyone left the hotel in a good mood.

Departure was scheduled for 08:00 GMT, but because of fog, the aircraft was delayed in Genoa and was able to land at Orio al Serio Airport in Bergamo only at 07:20. According to the flight plan, the duration of the first part of the flight was to be 4 hours and 10 minutes, landing on runway 33. It is also worth noting that in terms of flight, the airport coordinates were given as 36756 North (latitude) and 025096 West (longitude), with the runway elevation being 0 feet (0 m). But the coordinates indicated did not correspond to either the charts nor any of the aircraft's navigation equipment, and the actual level of the airfield is 305 feet (93 m). Also during the investigation it was noted that the air navigation charts for this airport were outdated by 27 years, with the last update having been on 1 February 1962.

At 10:04, Flight 1851 departed Bergamo Airport.

=== Accident ===
Flight 1851 had communication difficulties with air traffic controllers at high frequencies (HF), although it worked without failures on the ground. At 12:46:33, the crew contacted the Santa Maria Air Traffic Control center and reported on the passage point 38°N 20°W. Flight 1851 was handled by a trainee air traffic controller. As the investigators later noted, phraseology was violated during the communications. The controller also used the word "point" instead of "decimal", meaning a decimal point. Radio communication with the land was conducted mainly by first officer Adcock, with the exception at 13:43:57 when flight engineer Gonzalez requested a weather report. At 13:44:20 the controller transmitted: "One eight five one wind two six zero... Fourteen ah fourteen knots maximum two four knots visibility more than ten kilometers one octa at one two zero zero feet six octa at three thousand feet ah temperature one seven QNH one zero one niner." During the transmission, the controller used non-standard terminology "at" in the sentence, "one octant for one two zero zero." Due to the communication difficulties, the crew heard the message as "one octant two two zero zero," from which they falsely determined that there were no clouds below 2,000 feet.

At 13:56:47, when flight 1851 was performing a descent to the airfield and passing 6,705 meters (21,998 ft), the controller dispatched: "Independent Air one eight five one roger you're cleared to three thousand feet on QNH one zero two seven and ah runway will be one niner." The controller made a major error during this transmission. He had reported to the crew the pressure of 1027 hPa, when it was actually 1018.7, (rounded 1018), which is 9 hPa lower. The instructor noticed this and wanted to transmit the correct information to the crew, but he was distracted by a phone call. Also, the crew members themselves failed to notice the transfer of high pressure, which 12 minutes earlier was much lower. This could have been facilitated by the presence of a flight attendant in the cockpit, whose voice was recorded by the Cockpit Voice Recorder (CVR) at 13:48:30 and at 14:04:09.

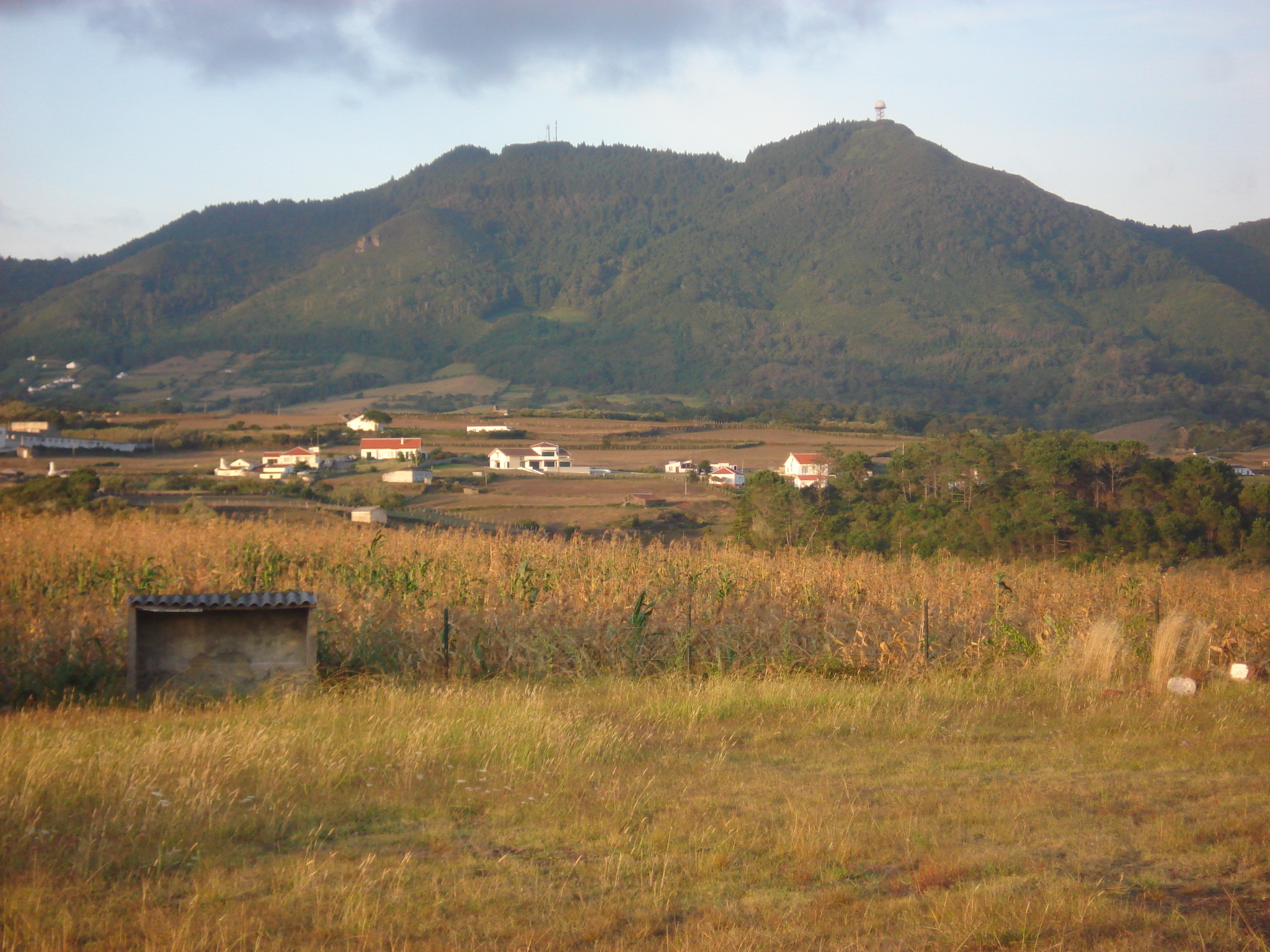
View of Pico-Alto

At 13:56:59 the co-pilot told the controller: "We're cleared to two thousand feet and ah...," but paused mid-sentence at 13:57:02. At that same time Daugherty said, "Make it three [thousand]." Then 13:57:07 Adcock continued his radio transmission: "one zero two seven." This was the last transmission from Flight 1851, but the controller did not hear the first part, as he continued to say that the flight would be landing on runway 19, and therefore did not know that the plane continued to descend to 2,000 feet (610 m). As this was below the minimum safe altitude of 3,000 feet (910 m), the aircraft was flying straight to the mountain.

At 14:02, at a speed of 260 knots (480 km/h; 300 mph), the plane passed a height of 5,000 feet (1,500 m) and got into a zone of light turbulence. At 14:03 Adcock stated, "Ah after two thousand yeah we'll get below these clouds." At 14:06 at a speed of 250 knots (460 km/h; 290 mph), and at a height of 2,000 feet (610 m) the aircraft encountered heavy turbulence near Santo Espírito, with Daugherty saying at 14:07:52, "Can't keep this son of a bitch thing straight up and down." Adcock asked Daugherty if he needed help, but he replied, "no." Then at 14:08:00 due to the turbulence, the aircraft climbed sharply from 1,751 feet (534 m) to 1,869 feet (570 m). As a result radio altimeter then gave a warning signal and then the Ground Proximity Warning System (GPWS) activated, sounding several "whoop whoop pull up" audible alarms, but the crew did not respond to warnings.

At 14:08:12, at an actual altitude of 1,795 feet (547 m) above sea level, the aircraft crashed into a wall by a road, skidded through trees with trunks about 30–40 centimeters (12–16 in) in diameter, and exploded. The impact occurred on the east side of the mountain. The majority of debris was on this side of the mountain, though several portions of debris were also found on the western slope of the mountain as the initial impact site was near the summit. All 144 people (7 crew members and 137 passengers) on board were killed. This is the deadliest aviation disaster to occur in Portugal and the fourth deadliest involving a Boeing 707.

== Investigation ==
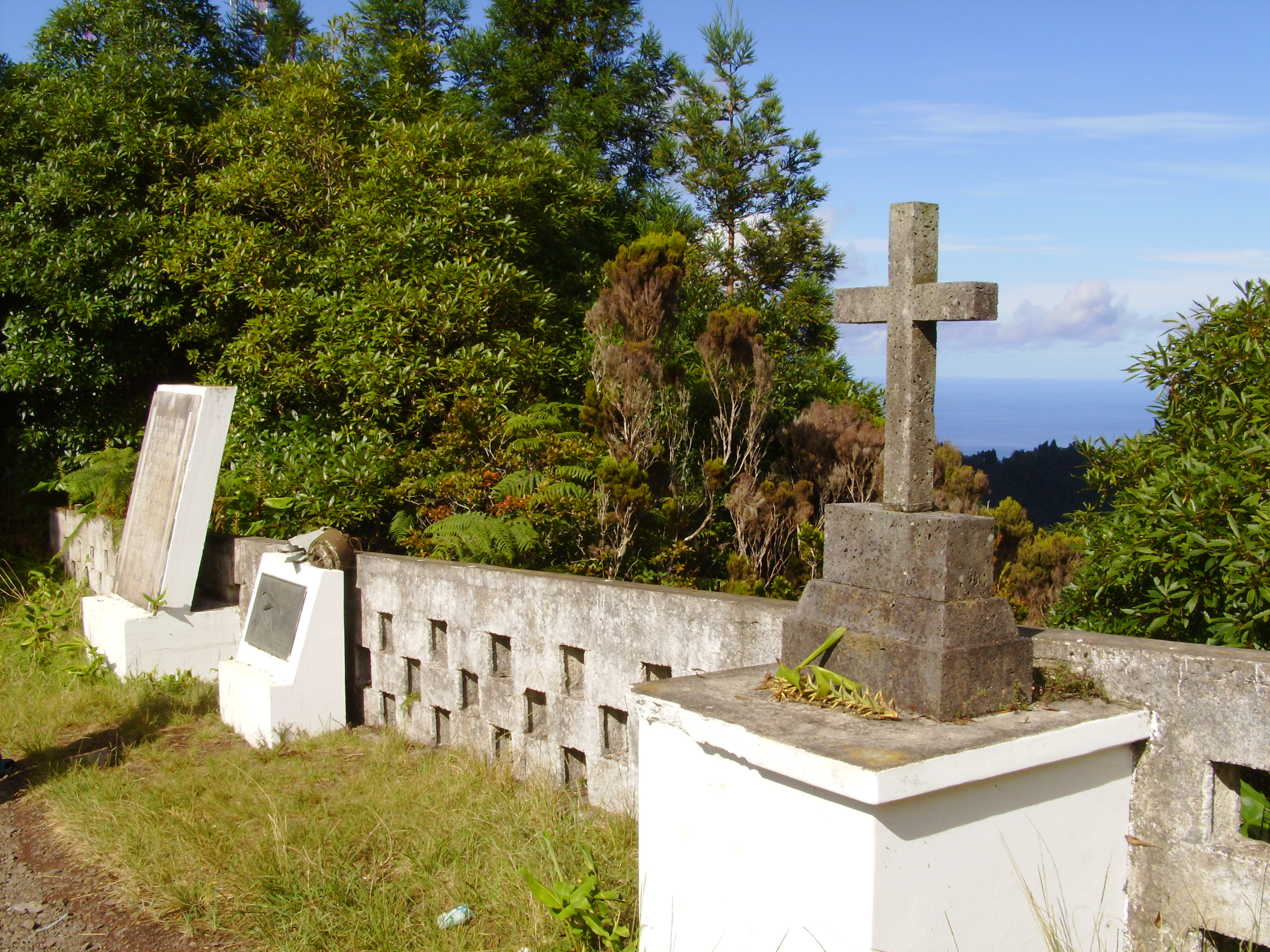
Flight 1851 Memorial

The altimeters found at the crash site had an exhibited pressure of 1028 and 1026 hPa, and their height read 2,000 feet (610 m). The overestimation of pressure by 9 hPa led to an overestimation of readings by 240 feet (73 m), but taking into account the distance to the summit and the height of trees growing on the mountain, it was concluded that this difference did not contribute to the accident.

The official investigation determined that during approach to Santa Maria Airport, the air traffic controller instructed the crew to descend to 3,000 feet (910 m) for an ILS approach to runway 19.

During that transmission, a trainee controller had also transmitted an incorrect QNH (barometric altimeter setting) that was 9 hPa too high. The approach instructions were not fully heard since the pilot had re-keyed his microphone to acknowledge the new QNH, and likely did not hear the second repeat of the 3,000 ft safe altitude, declaring: "We're re-cleared to 2,000 feet..." (610 m). Although the first officer questioned the barometric altitude, the captain agreed that the first officer had heard the read-back correctly.

After having been cleared to the ILS approach, the crew failed to accomplish the approach briefing, missing an opportunity to notice the 3,000 ft minimum safe altitude and the presence of Pico Alto.

Leveling off at 2,000 feet (610 m), the airliner experienced heavy turbulence near Santo Espírito and subsequently impacted the ridge of Pico Alto in a level attitude at an altitude of 1,795 feet (547 m). There was no evidence of any in-flight emergency and the altimeter was found correctly set to 1027 mb.

=== Conclusions ===
The Board of Inquiry concluded that the accident was due to non-observance by the crew of established operating procedures which led to the deliberate descent of the aircraft to 2,000 feet (610 m) when the published minimum sector altitude was 3,000 feet (910 m). It also found that the controller had put the aircraft 240 feet (73 m) below that indicated on board the aircraft, exacerbating the original error by the first officer.

Other factors:

- Bad communications techniques on the part of the co-pilot and controller, including the non-adherence to standard phraseology in some of the ground communication.
- Neglecting aerodrome control tower procedures in not requesting a readback of the descent clearance.
- The limited international flying experience of the crew and the airline's deficient crew training that did not include emergency maneuvering techniques for terrain avoidance.
- Non-compliance with the National Institute of Civil Aviation of Portugal Aeronautical Information Publications (flight plan procedures and authorized routes).

== Lawsuit ==
In 1992, a group of next-of-kin claimed Independent Air and the lessor of the aircraft, International Air Leases, were responsible for the loss of their relatives and sought compensation. In the court cases that followed, Independent Air was judged to have acted negligently based on the following statement:

"undisputed facts show that the pilot and crew flew the plane below an altitude of 3,000 feet, when their charts of the area clearly showed that it was dangerous to go below 3,000 feet because of the mountain. The pilot in command cannot excuse his act by alleging the air traffic controller directed him to descend to an altitude of 2,000 feet and gave him an incorrect altimeter setting. In descending below the safe indicated altitude, he knowingly placed the plane in a dangerous situation. He then proceeded to fly into the top of the mountain that he knew was there".

The case was settled for US$34 million (equivalent to $68 million in 2024).

== In popular culture ==
The crash of Independent Air Flight 1851 was featured in the 2023 episode "Mixed Signals", of the Canadian-made, internationally distributed documentary series Mayday.
