= Palm Beach International =

Palm Beach International may refer to:

- President Donald J. Trump International Airport, formerly Palm Beach International Airport
- Palm Beach International Film Festival
- Palm Beach International Raceway
