= Azores =

Portuguese archipelago in the North Atlantic

Azores Açores (Portuguese)
- Autonomous Region of Portugal and outermost region of the European Union
- Autonomous Region of the Azores; Região Autónoma dos Açores (Portuguese)
- Flag Coat of arms
- Motto: Antes morrer livres, que em paz, sujeitos (English: "Better to die free, than in peace as subjects")
- Anthem: Hino dos Açores (English: "Hymn of the Azores")
- Location of the Azores within Portugal (dark green) and the European Union (light green)
- Country: Portugal
- Settlement: 1432
- Autonomous status: 30 April 1976
- Named after: Açor (English: Northern goshawk)
- Capitals: Ponta Delgada (executive); Angra do Heroísmo (judicial); Horta (legislative); 38.66°N 28.07°W
- Largest city: Ponta Delgada
- Official languages: Portuguese
- Demonym(s): Azorean (Note: Portuguese: Açoriano / Açoriana)
- Government: Autonomous Region
  - Representative of the Republic: Susana Goulart Costa
  - Speaker: Luís Garcia
  - President: José Manuel Bolieiro
  - Vice President: Artur Lima
- Legislature: Legislative Assembly

National and European representation
  - Assembly of the Republic: 5 MPs (of 230)
  - European Parliament: 3 MEP (of 21 Portuguese seats)

Area
  - Total: 2,351 km^{2} (908 sq mi)
- Highest elevation (Mount Pico): 2,351 m (7,713 ft)
- Lowest elevation (Atlantic Ocean): 0 m (0 ft)

Population
  - 2021 census: 236,440
  - Density: 101/km^{2} (261.6/sq mi)
- GDP (nominal): 2024 estimate
  - Total: ▲€5.753 billion
  - Per capita: ▲€23,836
- Gini (2023-2023 late!): ▼33.8 medium
- HDI (2022): ▲0.814 very high
- Currency: Euro (€) (EUR)
- Time zone: UTC−01:00
  - Summer (DST): UTC+00:00
- Date format: yyyy-mm-dd
- Driving side: Right
- Calling code: +351 (292)
- Postal code: 95nn–99nn
- ISO 3166 code: PT-20
- Internet TLD: .pt
- Most populated island: São Miguel Island
- Usual abbreviation: RAA
- Website: azores.gov.pt

The Azores, (Note: /əˈzɔːrz/ ə-ZORZ, US also /ˈeɪzɔːrz/, AY-zorz; Portuguese: Açores, Portuguese pronunciation: [ɐˈsoɾɨʃ]) officially the Autonomous Region of the Azores, (Note: Região Autónoma dos Açores) is an archipelago of Portugal, in the Atlantic Ocean, about 1,400 km (870 miles) west of the Portuguese mainland. Politically and administratively, together with Madeira, it is one of the two autonomous regions of Portugal and a special territory of the European Union. It is the westernmost point and region of Portugal. (Note: As measured from the geographic center of Portugal.)

The Azores is an archipelago composed of nine volcanic islands in the Macaronesia region of the North Atlantic Ocean. There are nine major Azorean islands and an islet cluster, in three main groups. These are Flores and Corvo to the west; Graciosa, Terceira, São Jorge, Pico, and Faial in the centre; and São Miguel, Santa Maria, and the Formigas islets to the east. They extend for more than 600 km (370 mi) and lie in a northwest–southeast direction. All the islands have volcanic origins, although some, such as Santa Maria, have had no recorded activity in the time since the islands were settled several centuries ago. Mount Pico on the island of Pico is the highest point in Portugal, at 2,351 m (7,713 ft). If measured from their base at the bottom of the ocean to their peaks, the Azores are among the tallest mountains on the planet. The Azores are located at the seismically active Azores triple junction plate boundary where the North American plate, Eurasian plate and Nubian plate meet.

The climate is mild, being influenced by its distance from the continents and by the passing Gulf Stream. Because of the marine influence, temperatures remain mild year-round. Daytime temperatures normally fluctuate between 16 and 25 °C (61 and 77 °F) depending on season. Temperatures above 30 °C (86 °F) or below 3 °C (37 °F) are unknown in the major population centres. It is also generally wet and cloudy.

Its main industries are agriculture, dairy farming, livestock, fishing, and tourism, which has become a major service activity in the region. In the 20th century and to some extent into the 21st, the Azores have served as a waypoint for refueling aircraft flying between Europe and North America. The government of the Azores employs a large percentage of the population directly or indirectly in the service and tertiary sectors. The largest city is Ponta Delgada. The culture, dialect, cuisine, and traditions of the islands vary considerably, because these remote islands were settled sporadically over a span of two centuries.

== History ==
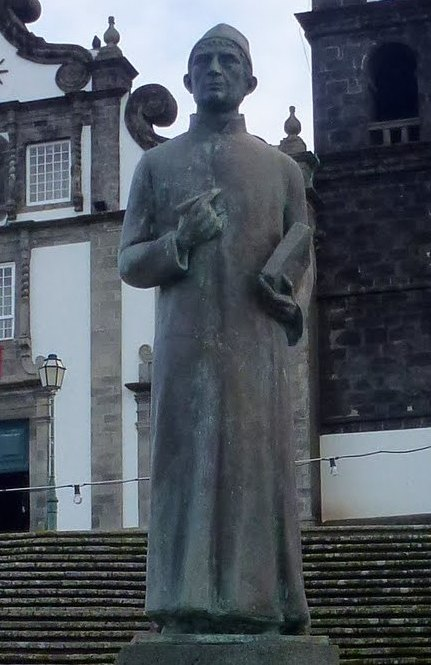
Gaspar Frutuoso wrote Saudades da Terra, the first history of the Azores and Macaronesia, in the 1580s.

A small number of alleged hypogea (underground structures carved into rocks) have been identified on the islands of Corvo, Santa Maria, and Terceira by Portuguese archaeologist Nuno Ribeiro, who speculated that they might date back 2,000 years, implying a human presence on the islands before the Portuguese. These structures have been used by settlers in the Azores to store grain. The suggestion by Ribeiro that they might be burial sites is unconfirmed. Detailed examination and dating to authenticate the validity of these speculations are lacking; thus it is unclear whether these structures are natural or human-made and whether they predate the 15th century Portuguese colonization of the Azores. A statue of a man on horseback was found by Diogo de Teive on Corvo Island while discovering the island, as well as Carthaginian coins in 1749.

According to a 2015 paper published in Journal of Evolutionary Biology, research based on mouse mitochondrial DNA points to a Scandinavian rather than Portuguese origin of the local mouse population. A 2021 paper published in Proceedings of the National Academy of Sciences, using data from lake sediment core sampling, suggests brush-clearing was undertaken and animal husbandry introduced between 700 and 850 A.D. These findings suggest a brief period of Norse settlement, and the 2021 paper further cites climate simulations that suggest the dominant westerly winds in the North Atlantic Ocean were weaker in that period, which would have made it easier for Viking ships to sail to the Azores from Scandinavia.

=== Discovery ===
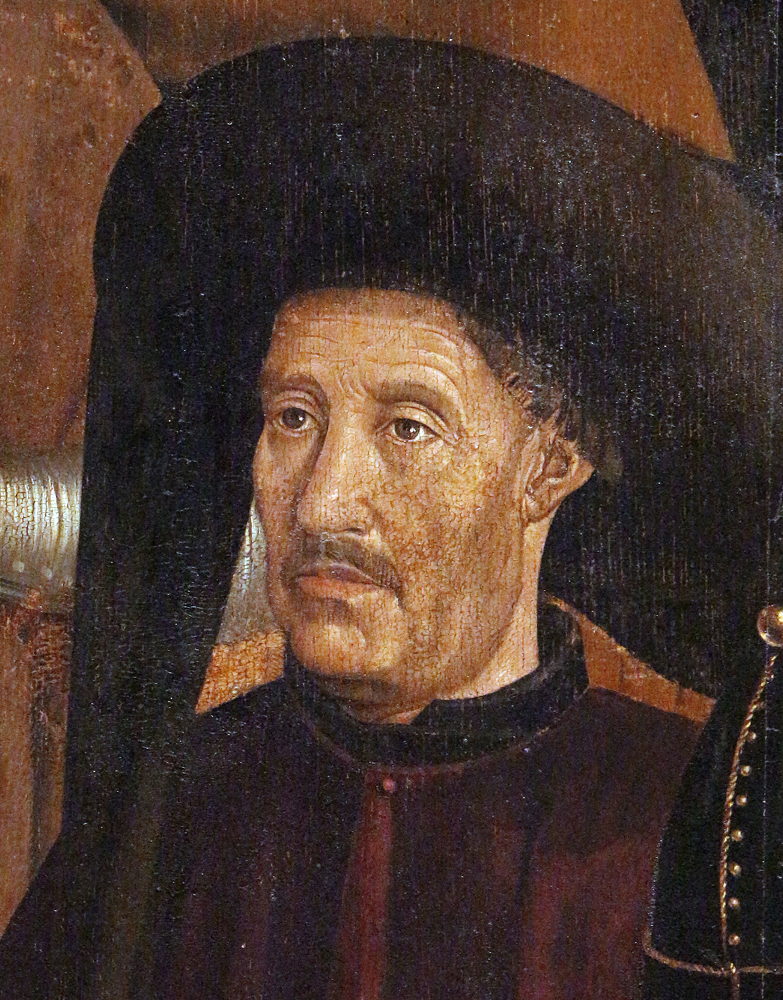
Under the direction of Prince Henry the Navigator, the Azores were discovered and populated in the early 1400s.

In 1427 a captain sailing for Prince Henry the Navigator, possibly Gonçalo Velho, may have discovered the Azores, but this is not certain. In Thomas Ashe's 1813 work A History of the Azores, the author identified a Fleming, Joshua Vander Berg of Bruges, who made landfall in the archipelago during a storm on his way to Lisbon. According to Ashe, the Portuguese explored the area and claimed it for Portugal. Other writers note the discovery of the first islands (São Miguel, Santa Maria and Terceira) by sailors in the service of Henry the Navigator, although there are few documents to support such claims.

Although it is commonly said that the archipelago received its name from açor (Portuguese for goshawk, a common bird at the time of discovery) it is unlikely that the bird ever nested or hunted on the islands. There were no large animals on Santa Maria; after its discovery and before settlement began, sheep were let loose on the island to supply future settlers with food.

=== Early settlement ===
The archipelago was largely settled from mainland Portugal, but settlement did not take place immediately. From 1433 Gonçalo Velho Cabral gathered resources and settlers, and he sailed in 1436 to establish colonies, first on Santa Maria and then on São Miguel. Settlers built houses, established villages and cleared bush and rocks to plant crops, grain, grapevines, sugar cane and other plants suitable for local use and for export. They brought domesticated animals, such as chickens, rabbits, cattle, sheep, goats and pigs. The settlement of the unoccupied islands began in 1439 with people mainly from the continental provinces of Algarve and Alentejo. São Miguel was first settled in 1449, the settlers – mainly from Estremadura, Alto Alentejo and Algarve – under the command of Cabral, who landed at the site of modern-day Povoação.

=== Flemish settlers ===
The first reference to the island of São Jorge was made in 1439, but the date of discovery is unknown. In 1443 the island was already inhabited, but settlement began only after the arrival of Willem van der Haegen. Arriving at Topo, São Jorge, where he lived and died, he became known as Guilherme da Silveira to the islanders. João Vaz Corte-Real received the captaincy of the island in 1483. Velas became a town before the end of the 15th century. By 1490 there were 2,000 Flemings living on the islands of Terceira, Pico, Faial, São Jorge and Flores. Because there was such a large Flemish settlement, the Azores became known as the Flemish Islands or the Isles of Flanders.

Prince Henry the Navigator was responsible for this Flemish settlement. His sister Isabel was married to Philip the Good, Duke of Burgundy (Flanders at the time belonged to Burgundy). There was a revolt against Philip's rule, and disease and hunger became rampant. Isabel appealed to Henry to allow some of the unruly Flemings to settle in the Azores. He granted this and supplied them with means of transport and goods.

=== 1522 earthquake and recovery ===
In 1522, Vila Franca do Campo, then the capital of São Miguel, was devastated by an earthquake and landslide that killed about 5,000 people, and the capital was moved to Ponta Delgada. Vila Franca do Campo was rebuilt on the original site and today is a thriving fishing and yachting port. Ponta Delgada received its city status in 1546. From the first settlement, the pioneers applied themselves to agriculture, and by the 15th century Graciosa was exporting wheat, barley, wine and brandy. The goods were sent to Terceira largely because of the proximity of that island.

=== Portuguese succession crisis of 1580 ===
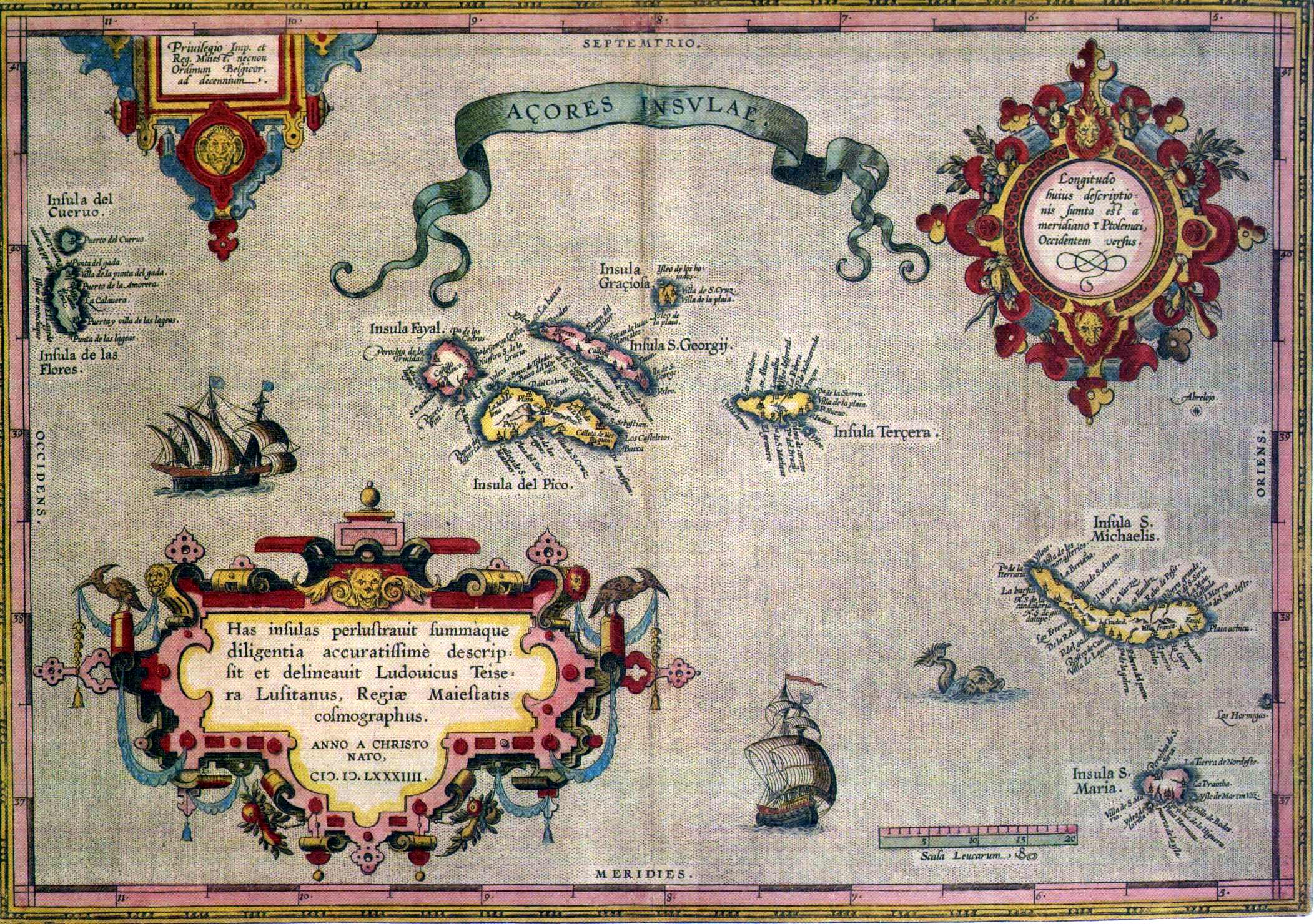
1584 map of the Azores Islands

Portugal fell into a dynastic crisis following the death of Cardinal-King Henry in 1580. Of the various claimants to the crown, the most powerful was King Philip II of Spain, who justified his rights to the throne by the fact that his mother was a Portuguese royal princess: his maternal grandfather was King Manuel I.

On 19 July 1580, António, Prior of Crato was acclaimed King of Portugal in Santarém by his supporters, followed by popular acclamation in Lisbon and other towns, as well as in the Azores (through his envoy António da Costa), to which he fled following his defeat at the Battle of Alcântara. Although Philip became king, the Azoreans resisted Spanish attempts to conquer the islands (including specifically at the Battle of Salga) and were administered by Cipriano de Figueiredo, governor of Terceira (who continued to govern Terceira in the name of the ill-fated former King Sebastian).

In 1583 Philip sent his fleet to clear the Azores of a combined multinational force of adventurers, mercenaries, volunteers, and soldiers who were attempting to establish the Azores as a staging post for a rival pretender to the Portuguese throne. Following the success of his fleet at the Battle of Ponta Delgada, captured enemies were hanged from yardarms, as they were considered pirates by Philip II. Opponents receiving the news variously portrayed Philip as a despot or "Black Legend", the sort of insult widely made against contemporary monarchs engaged in aggressive empire building and the European wars of religion. Figueiredo and Violante do Canto helped organize a resistance on Terceira that influenced some of the response of the other islands, even as internal politics and support for Philip's faction increased on the other islands (including specifically on São Miguel, where the Gonçalvez da Câmara family supported the Spanish claimant).

=== English raids of 1589 and 1598 ===
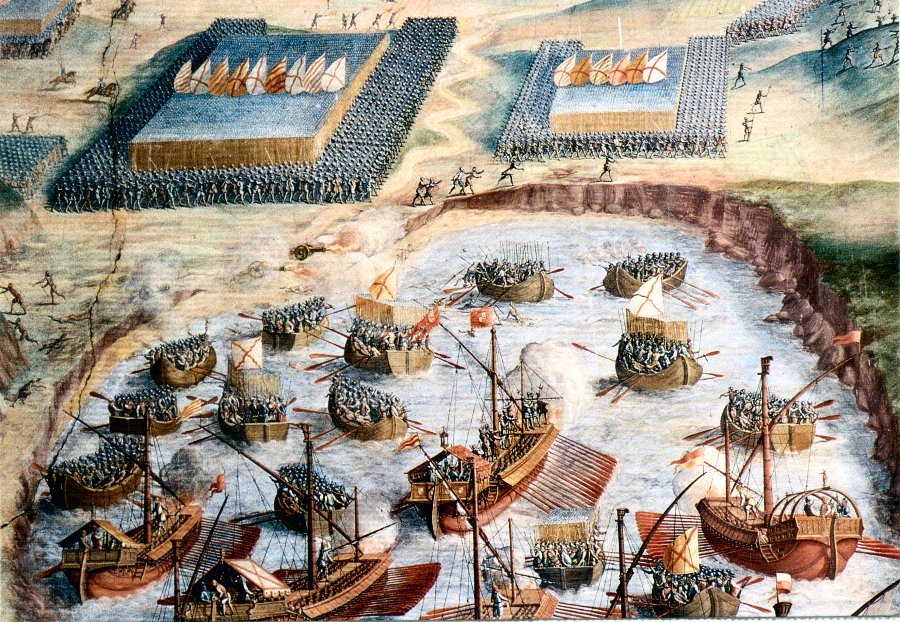
The Battle of Terceira, part of the War of the Portuguese Succession

An English raid of the Azores in 1589 successfully plundered some islands and harbouring ships; eight years later, a second raid failed.

=== Iberian Union ===
Spain held the Azores under the Iberian Union from 1580 to 1642 (called the "Babylonian captivity" in the Azores). The Azores were the last part of the Portuguese Empire to resist Philip's reign over Portugal (Macau resisted any official recognition), until the defeat of forces loyal to the Prior of Crato with the Conquest of the Azores in 1583. Portuguese control resumed with the end of the Iberian Union in 1640 and the beginning of the Portuguese Restoration War, not by the professional military who were occupied with warfare on the Portuguese mainland, but by local people attacking a fortified Castilian garrison.

=== Overpopulation and emigration ===
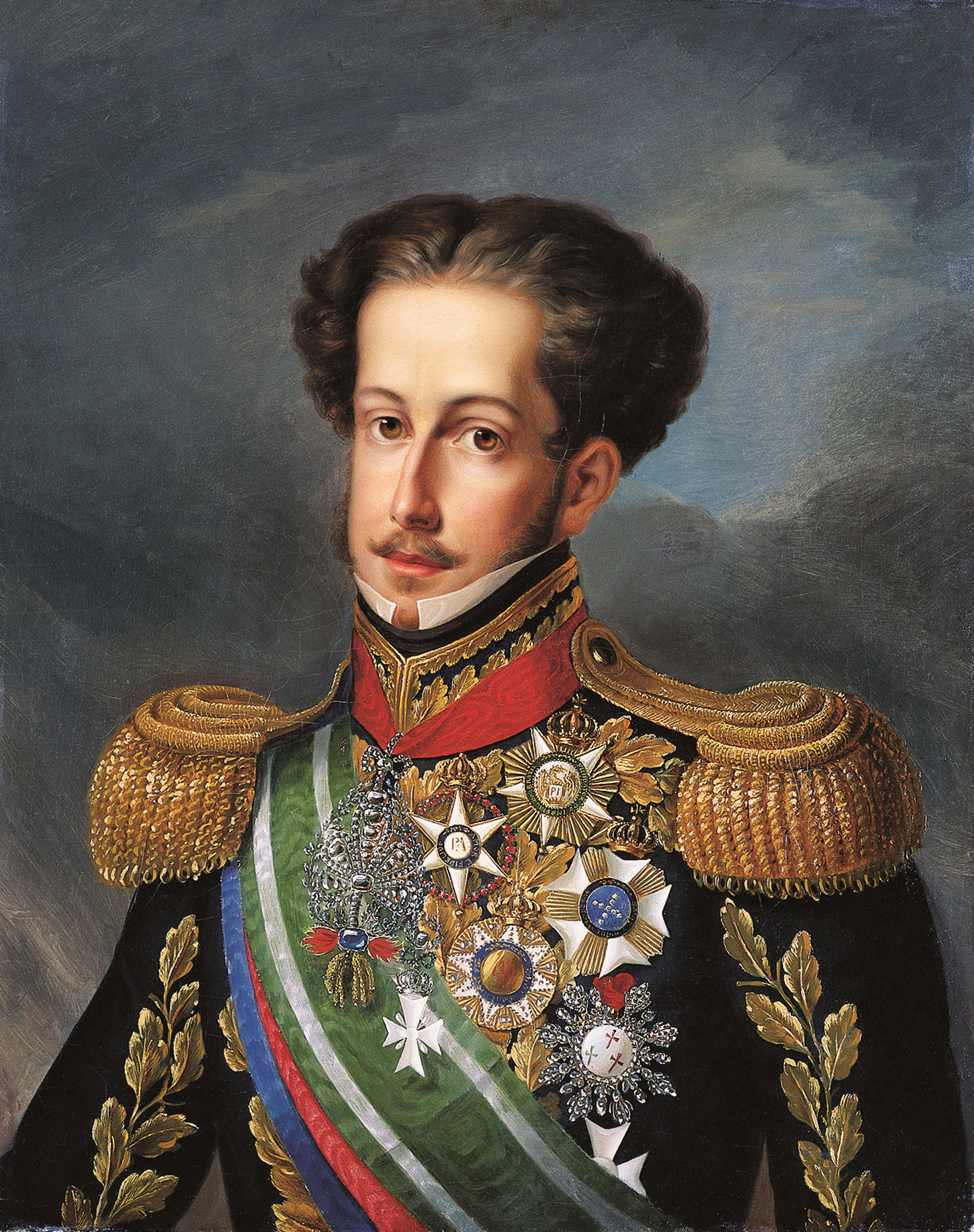
King-Emperor Pedro IV & I planned and launched his campaign in the Liberal Wars from the Azores in name of his daughter Queen Maria II

In the late 19th century, the Azores and Madeira began to face problems of overpopulation. Responding to the consequent economic problems, some people of the Azores began to emigrate to the United States, Canada and Brazil.

In 1902 the Dominion Line began operating a Mediterranean passenger service between Boston and Italy via Gibraltar and the Azores, with an established port of call at São Miguel. In 1904 the service was taken over by the White Star Line. Four ships formerly owned by Dominion were renamed and put into service under White Star, named Canopic, Romanic, Cretic and Republic, the last of which is best known for its 1909 sinking off the New England coast. Canopic and Romanic provided regular service to Boston, while Cretic and Republic operated on the service to both New York and Boston throughout their careers. By the time the service ended in 1921, these four ships had transported an estimated total of 58,000 Azorean Portuguese to the United States.

=== Liberal Wars of 1828–1834 ===
The Portuguese Civil War (1828–1834) had strong repercussions in the Azores. In 1829 in Praia da Vitória, the liberals won over the absolutists, making Terceira Island the main headquarters of the new Portuguese regime and also where the Council of Regency (Conselho de Regência) of Maria II was established. Beginning in 1868, Portugal issued its stamps overprinted with "AÇORES" for use in the islands. Between 1892 and 1906, it also issued separate stamps for the three administrative districts of the time.

=== Arbitrary district divisions 1836–1976 ===
From 1836 to 1976, the archipelago was divided into three districts, equivalent (except in area) to those in the Portuguese mainland. The division was arbitrary and did not follow the natural island groups, rather reflecting the location of each district capital on the three main cities (none of which were on the western group).

- Angra do Heroísmo consisted of Terceira, São Jorge, and Graciosa, with the capital at Angra do Heroísmo on Terceira.
- Horta consisted of Pico, Faial, Flores, and Corvo, with the capital at Horta on Faial.
- Ponta Delgada consisted of São Miguel and Santa Maria, with the capital at Ponta Delgada on São Miguel.

=== Modern period ===
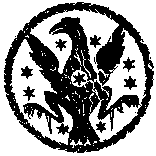
Symbol of the Azorean autonomist movement in the 19th century

In 1931 the Azores (together with Madeira and Portuguese Guinea) revolted against the Ditadura Nacional and were held briefly by rebel military. In 1943 during World War II, Portuguese ruler António de Oliveira Salazar leased air and naval bases in the Azores to Great Britain. The occupation of these facilities in October 1943 was codenamed Operation Alacrity by the British. This was a key turning point in the Battle of the Atlantic, enabling the Royal Air Force, the U.S. Army Air Forces, and the U.S. Navy to provide aerial coverage in the Mid-Atlantic gap. This helped them to protect convoys and to hunt hostile German U-boats.

The Azores Liberation Front's flag preceded the modern Azorean flag.

In 1944 the U.S. constructed a small and short-lived air base on Santa Maria. In 1945 a base was constructed on Terceira, named Lajes Field. Lajes Field is a plateau rising out of the sea on the northeast corner of the island, which had been a large farm. The base is a joint American and Portuguese venture that continues to support American and Portuguese Armed Forces. During the Cold War, U.S. Navy P-3 Orion anti-submarine warfare squadrons patrolled the North Atlantic Ocean for Soviet Navy submarines and surface warships. Since its opening, Lajes Field has been used for refuelling American cargo planes bound for Europe, Africa, and the Middle East. The U.S. Navy keeps a small squadron of its ships at the harbor of Praia da Vitória, three km (1.9 mi) southeast of Lajes Field. The airfield also has a small commercial terminal handling scheduled and chartered passenger flights from the other islands in the Azores, Europe, Africa, and North America.

Following the Carnation Revolution of 1974 which deposed the Estado Novo dictatorship in Lisbon, Portugal and its territories across the world entered into a period of great political uncertainty. The Azorean Liberation Front attempted to take advantage of this instability immediately after the revolution, hoping to establish an independent Azores, until operations ceased in 1975.

In 1976, the Azores became the Autonomous Region of the Azores (Região Autónoma dos Açores), one of the autonomous regions of Portugal, and the subdistricts of the Azores were eliminated. In 2003 the Azores gained international attention when United States President George W. Bush, British Prime Minister Tony Blair, Spanish Prime Minister José María Aznar, and Portuguese Prime Minister José Manuel Durão Barroso held a summit there days before the commencement of the Iraq War.

== Geography ==
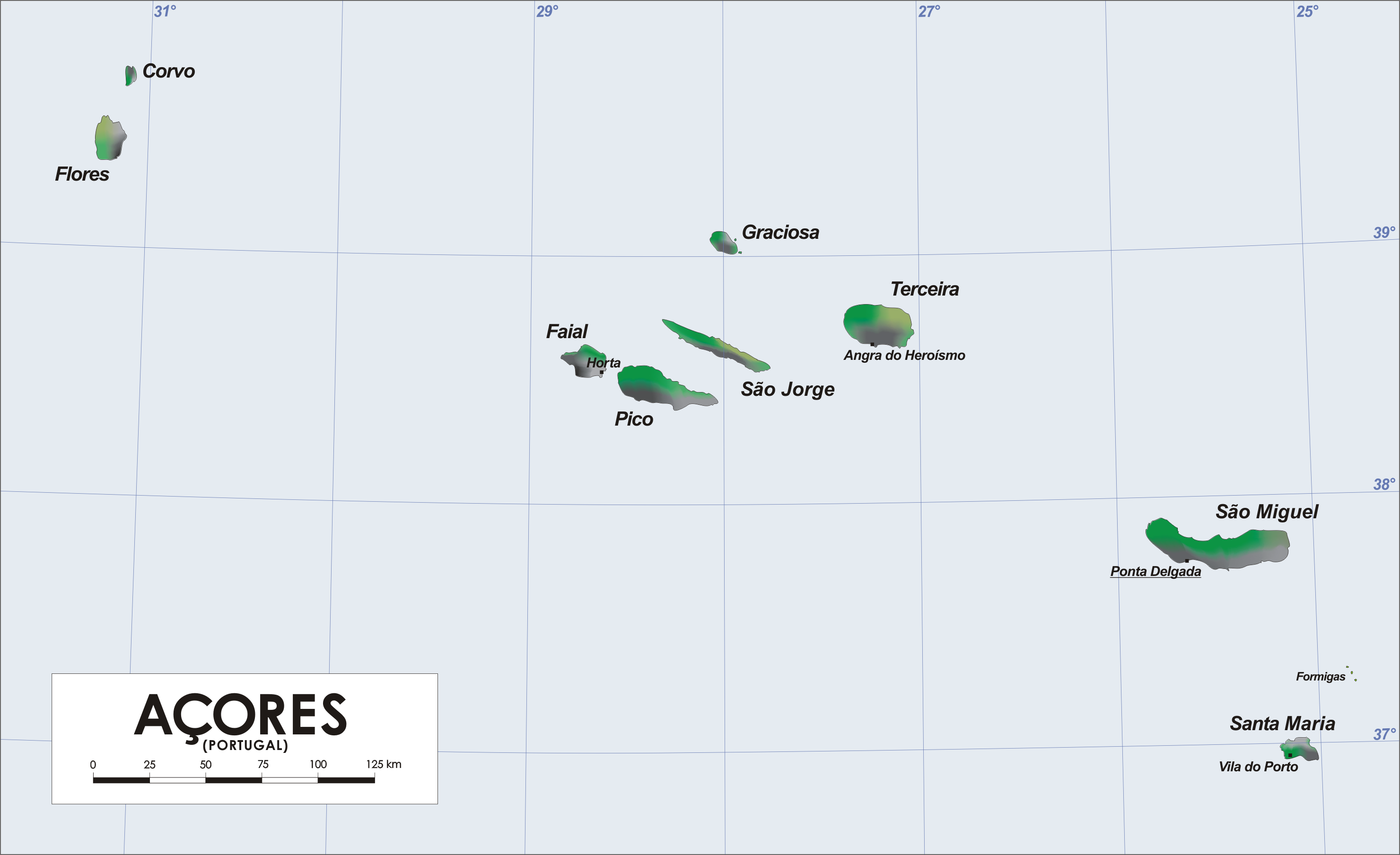
Map of the Azores

Surface areas of the Azores Islands
Island	Area	
Island	km^{2}	sq mi
São Miguel	759	293
Pico	446	172
Terceira	403	156
São Jorge	246	95
Faial	173	67
Flores	143	55
Santa Maria	97	37
Graciosa	62	24
Corvo	17	7

The archipelago is located in the northern hemisphere within the Atlantic Ocean and extends along a west-northwest to east-southeast orientation (between 36.5°–40° North latitudes and 24.5°–31.5° West longitudes) in an area approximately 600 km (373 mi) wide. The islands of the Azores emerged from the Azores Plateau, a 5.8 million km^{2} region that is morphologically accented by a depth of 2,000 m (6,600 ft).

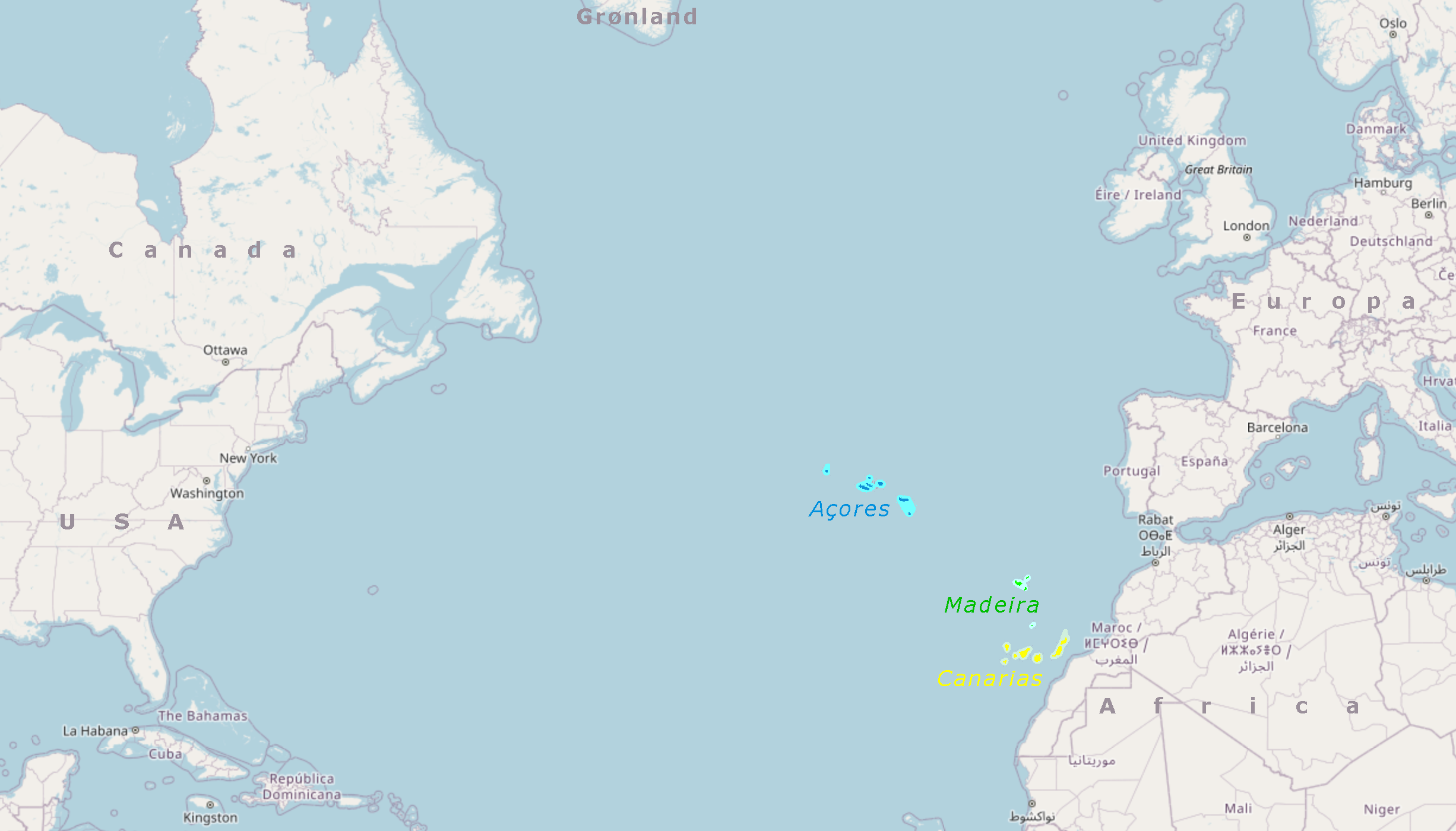
Azores (blue), Madeira (green) and the Canary Islands (yellow) in the northern Atlantic

The nine islands that compose the archipelago occupy a surface area of 2,346 km^{2} (906 sq mi), that includes both the main islands and many islets located in their vicinities. They range in surface area from the largest, São Miguel, at 759 km^{2} (293 sq mi) to the smallest, Corvo, at approximately 17 km^{2} (7 sq mi). São Jorge, Pico and Faial are collectively called Ilhas do Triângulo ('Islands of the Triangle').

Each of the islands has its own distinct geomorphological characteristics that make them unique:

- Corvo is a crater of a major Plinian eruption
- Flores (its neighbor on the North American plate) is a rugged island carved by many valleys and escarpments
- Faial is characterized for its shield volcano and caldera (Caldeira Volcano)
- Pico has the highest point, at 2,351 m (7,713 ft), in the Azores and Portugal
- Graciosa is known for its active Furnas do Enxofre and mixture of volcanic cones and plains
- São Jorge is a long slender island, formed from fissural eruptions over thousands of years
- Terceira, almost circular, contains one of the largest craters in the region
- São Miguel is pitted with many large craters and fields of spatter cones
- Santa Maria – the oldest island – is heavily eroded, being one of the few places to encounter brown sandy beaches in the archipelago.

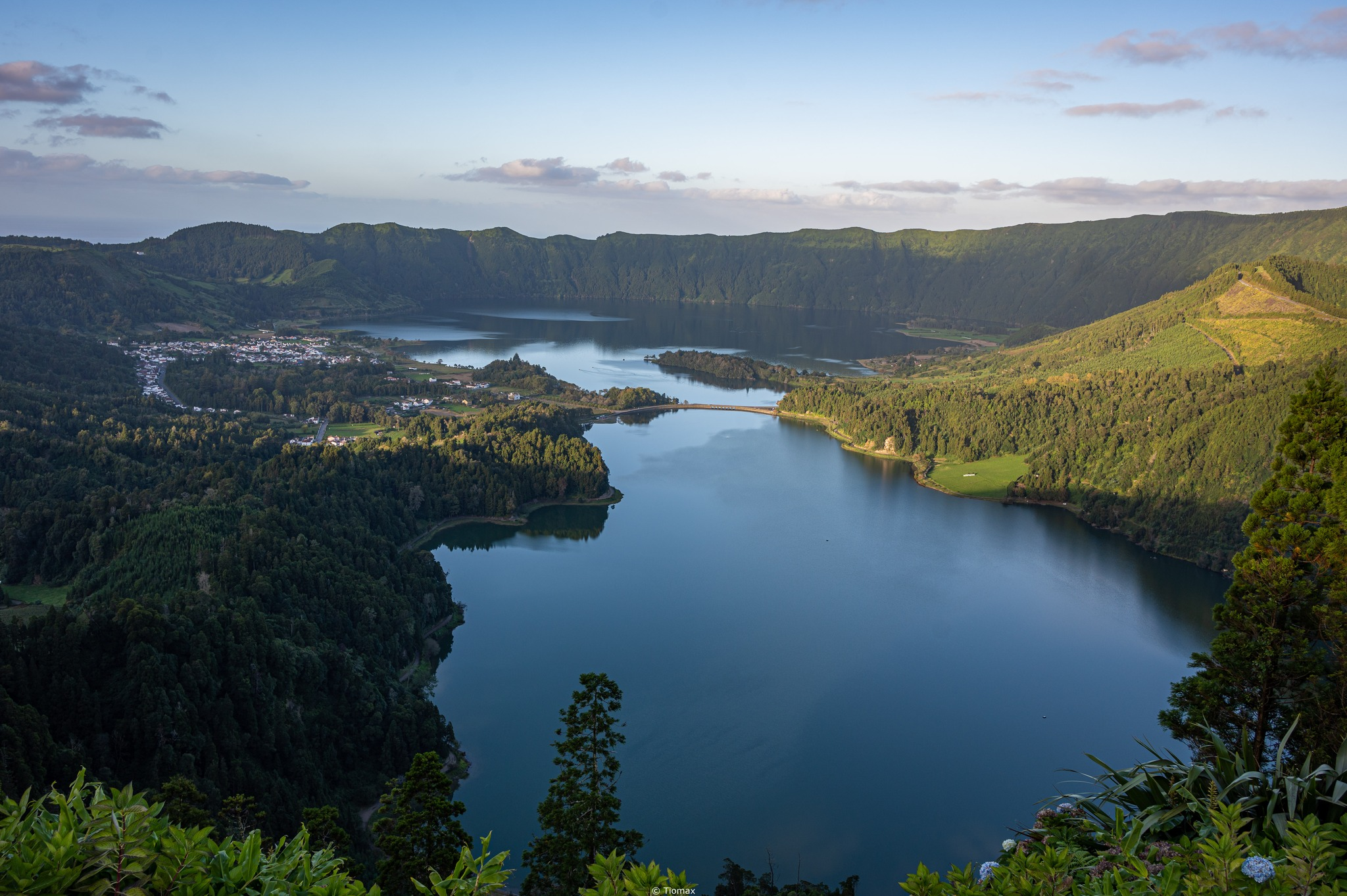
The Lagoa das Sete Cidades, located within the Sete Cidades Massif, in Sete Cidades, São Miguel Island.

The islands can be divided into three recognizable groups located on the Azores Plateau:

- The Eastern Group (Grupo Oriental) of São Miguel, Santa Maria and Formigas Islets
- The Central Group (Grupo Central) of Terceira, Graciosa, São Jorge, Pico and Faial
- The Western Group (Grupo Ocidental) of Flores and Corvo.

Several sub-surface reefs (particularly the Dollabarat on the fringe of the Formigas), banks (specifically the Princess Alice Bank and D. João de Castro Bank), as well as many hydrothermal vents and sea-mounts are monitored by the regional authorities, owing to the complex geotectonic and socioeconomic significance within the economic exclusion zone of the archipelago.

=== Geology ===
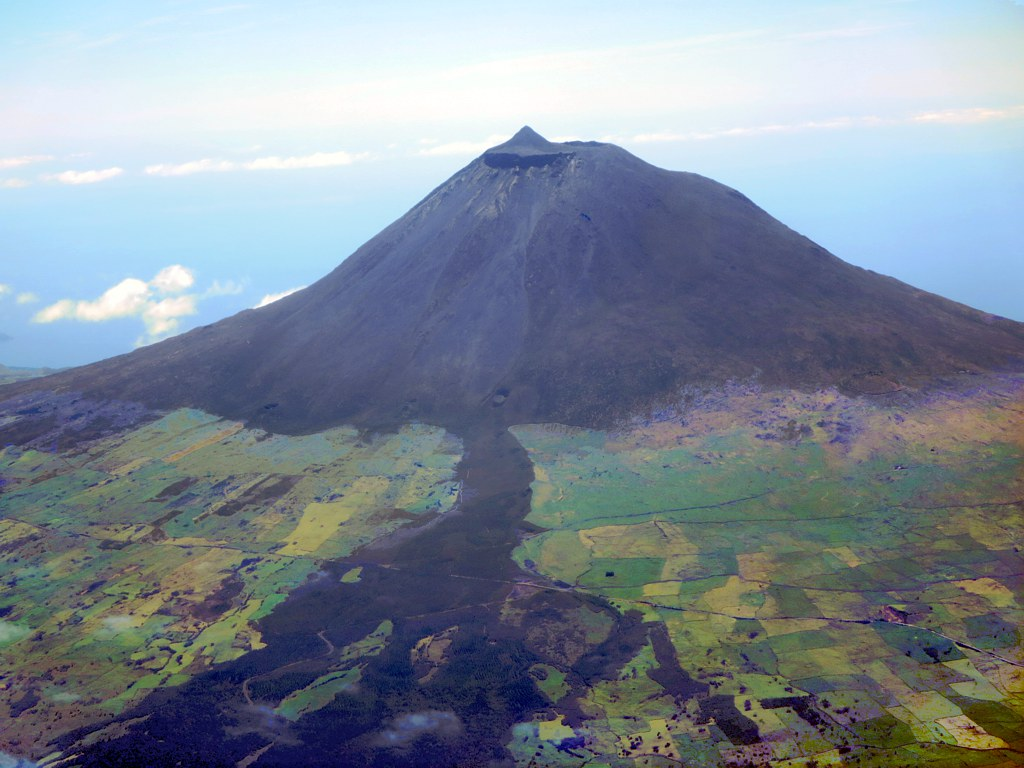
Mount Pico, the highest mountain in Portugal, displays the remnants of its last major eruption on its northern flank

From a geostructural perspective, the Azores are located above an active triple junction between three of the world's major tectonic plates (the North American plate, the Eurasian plate and the African plate), a condition that has translated into the existence of many faults and fractures in this region of the Atlantic. The Western Group is located on the North American plate, while the remaining islands are located within the boundary that divides the Eurasian and African plates.

The principal tectonic structures that exist in the region include the Mid-Atlantic Ridge, the Terceira Rift, the Azores Fracture Zone and the Glória Fault. The Mid-Atlantic Ridge is the main frontier between the North American plate and the African-Eurasian plates that crosses the Azores Plateau between Flores and Faial from north to south then to the southwest; it is an extensive form crossed by many transform faults running perpendicular to its north–south orientation, that is seismically active and susceptible to volcanism. The Terceira Rift is a system of fractures that extends from the Mid-Atlantic Ridge to the Glória Fault that represents the main frontier between the Eurasian and African plates. It is defined by a line of submarine volcanoes and island mounts that extend northwest to southeast for about 550 km (342 mi), from the area west of Graciosa until the islets of the Formigas, that includes Graciosa, Terceira and São Miguel. Its northwest limit connects to the Mid-Atlantic Ridge, while the southeast section intersects the Gloria Fault southeast of Santa Maria. The Azores Fracture Zone extends from the Glória Fault and encompasses a relatively inactive area to the south the Central and Eastern groups north to the Terceira Rift, along a 45° angle. The Glória Fault extends 800 km (497 mi) along a linear line from the Azores to the Azores–Gibraltar transform fault.

==== Mountains ====
Five tallest mountains of the Azores:
Mountain	Height (meters)	Height (feet)	Island
Montanha do Pico	2,351	7,713	Pico Island
Pico da Vara	1,103	3,619	São Miguel
Pico da Esperança	1,053	3,455	São Jorge
Cabeço Gordo	1,043	3,422	Faial
Calderia de Santa Bárbara	1,023	3,356	Terceira

==== Volcanoes ====
The islands' volcanism is associated with the rifting along the Azores triple junction; the spread of the crust along the existing faults and fractures has produced many of the active volcanic and seismic events, while supported by buoyant upwelling in the deeper mantle, some associate with an Azores hotspot. Most of the volcanic activity has centered primarily along the Terceira Rift.

From the beginning of the islands' settlement around the 15th century, there have been 28 registered volcanic eruptions (15 terrestrial and 13 submarine). The last significant volcanic eruption, the Capelinhos volcano (Vulcão dos Capelinhos), occurred off the coast of Faial in 1957; the most recent volcanic activity occurred in the seamounts and submarine volcanoes off the coast of Serreta and in the Pico-São Jorge Channel.

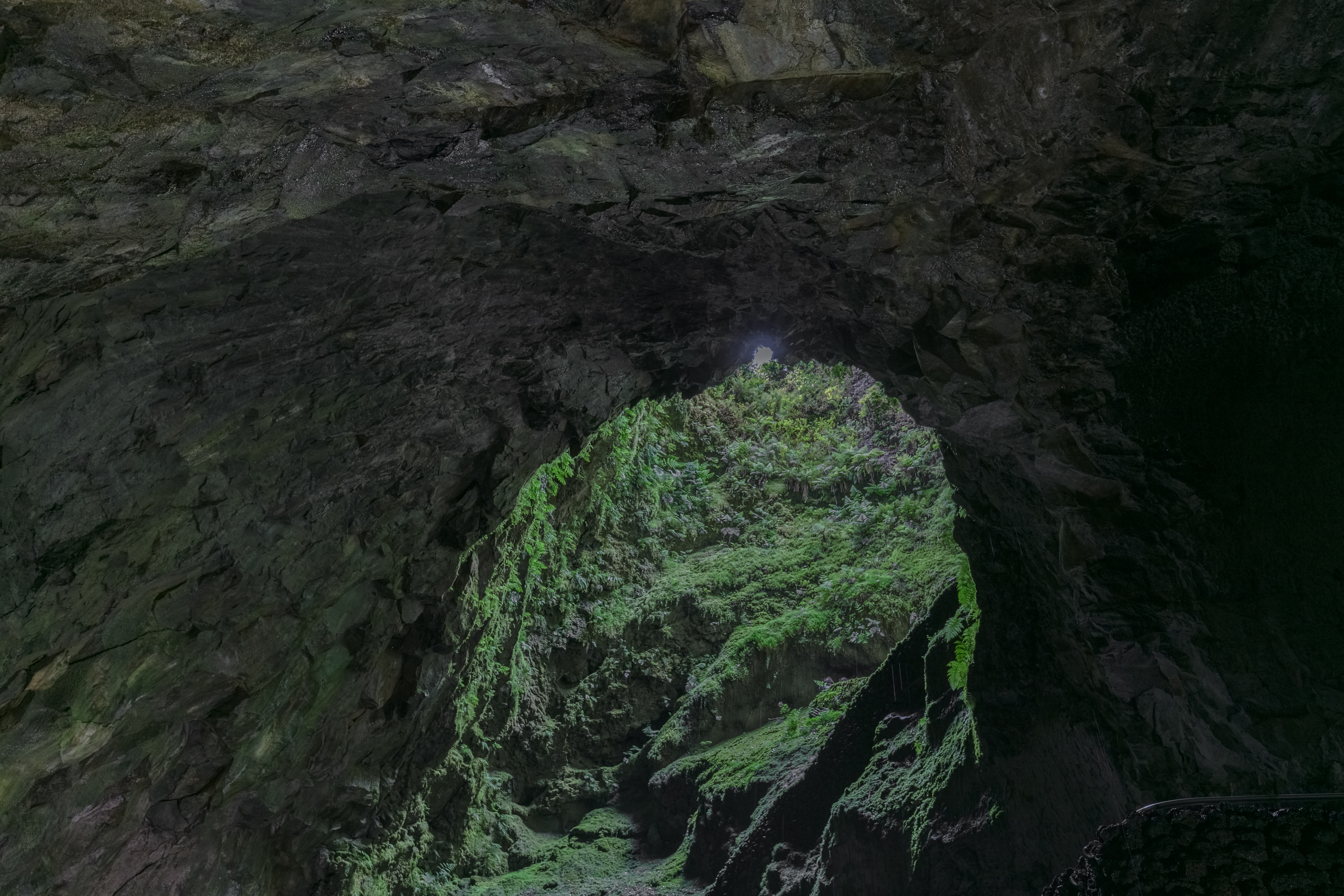
Algar do Carvão volcanic cave on Terceira Island

The islands have many examples of volcano-built geomorphology including caves and lava tubes (such as the Gruta das Torres, Algar do Carvão, Gruta do Natal, Gruta das Cinco Ribeiras), the coastal lava fields (like the coast of Feteiras, Faial, the Mistério of Prainha or São João on Pico Island) in addition to the inactive cones in central São Miguel, the aforementioned Capelinhos on Faial, the volcanic complexes of Terceira or Plinian caldeira of Corvo Island. The islands of the archipelago were formed through volcanic and seismic activity during the Neogene Period; the first embryonic surfaces started to appear in the waters of Santa Maria during the Miocene epoch (from circa 8 million years ago).

The sequence of the island formation has been generally characterized as: Santa Maria (8.12 Ma), São Miguel (4.1 Ma), Terceira (3.52 Ma), Graciosa (2.5 Ma), Flores (2.16 Ma), Faial (0.7 Ma), São Jorge (0.55 Ma), Corvo (0.7 Ma) and Pico (0.27 Ma). All islands have experienced volcanism during their geological history, with Late Holocene volcanism being recorded from Flores and Faial. Within recorded "human settlement" history Santa Maria, Graciosa, Flores, and Corvo have not experienced any volcanic eruptions; in addition to active fumaroles and hot-springs, the remaining islands have had sporadic eruptions since the 14th century. Apart from the Capelinhos volcano in 1957–1958, the last recorded instance of "island formation" occurred off the coast of São Miguel, when the island of Sabrina was briefly formed.

==== Earthquakes ====
Owing to its geodynamic environment, the region has been a center of intense seismic activity, particularly along its tectonic boundaries on the Mid-Atlantic Ridge and Terceira Rift. Seismic events although frequent, are usually tectonic or vulco-tectonic in nature but in general are of low to medium intensities, occasionally punctuated by events of magnitude 5 or greater. The most severe earthquake was registered in 1757, near Calheta, which exceeded magnitude 7. In comparison, the 1522 earthquake that was mentioned by historian Gaspar Frutuoso measured 6.8, but its effects were judged to be X (Extreme) on the Mercalli intensity scale, and was responsible for the destruction of Vila Franca do Campo and landslides that may have killed more than 5,000 of the inhabitants.

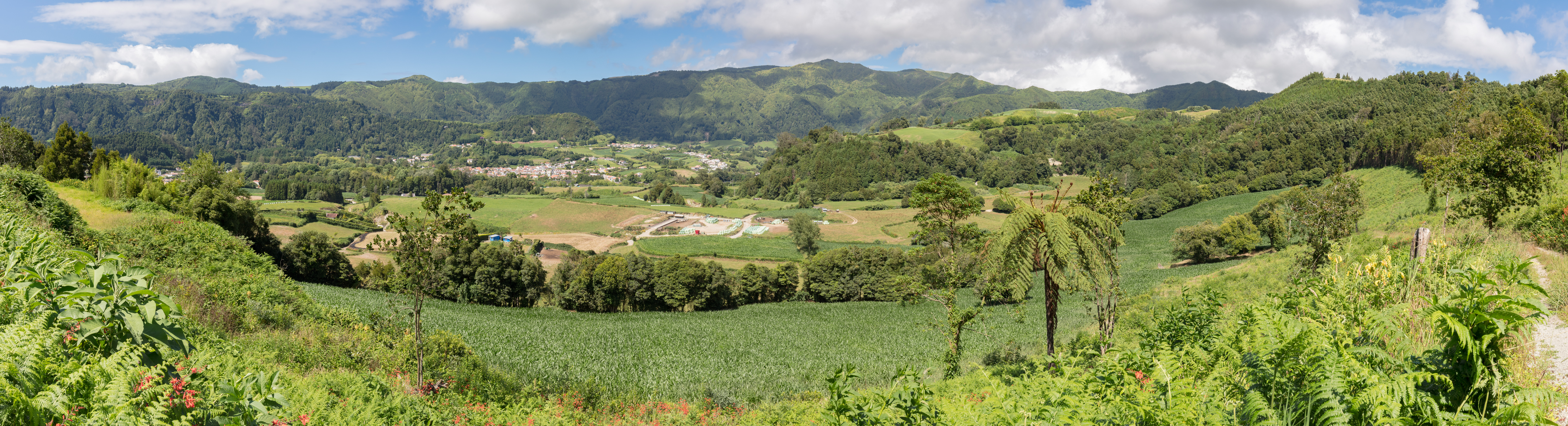
Usual biome of the islands. A mix of laurisilva, introduced Cryptomeria forests and agricultural fields, with usually small populated centers in between. Photo from Furnas, São Miguel Island

=== Biodiversity ===
The archipelago lies in the Palearctic realm and has a unique biotic community that includes the Macaronesian subtropical laurissilva, with many endemic species of plants and animals. There are at least 6,112 terrestrial species, of which about 411 are endemic. The majority (75%) of these endemics are animals, mostly arthropods and mollusks. New species are found regularly in the Azores (e.g., 30 different new species of land snails were discovered circa 2013).

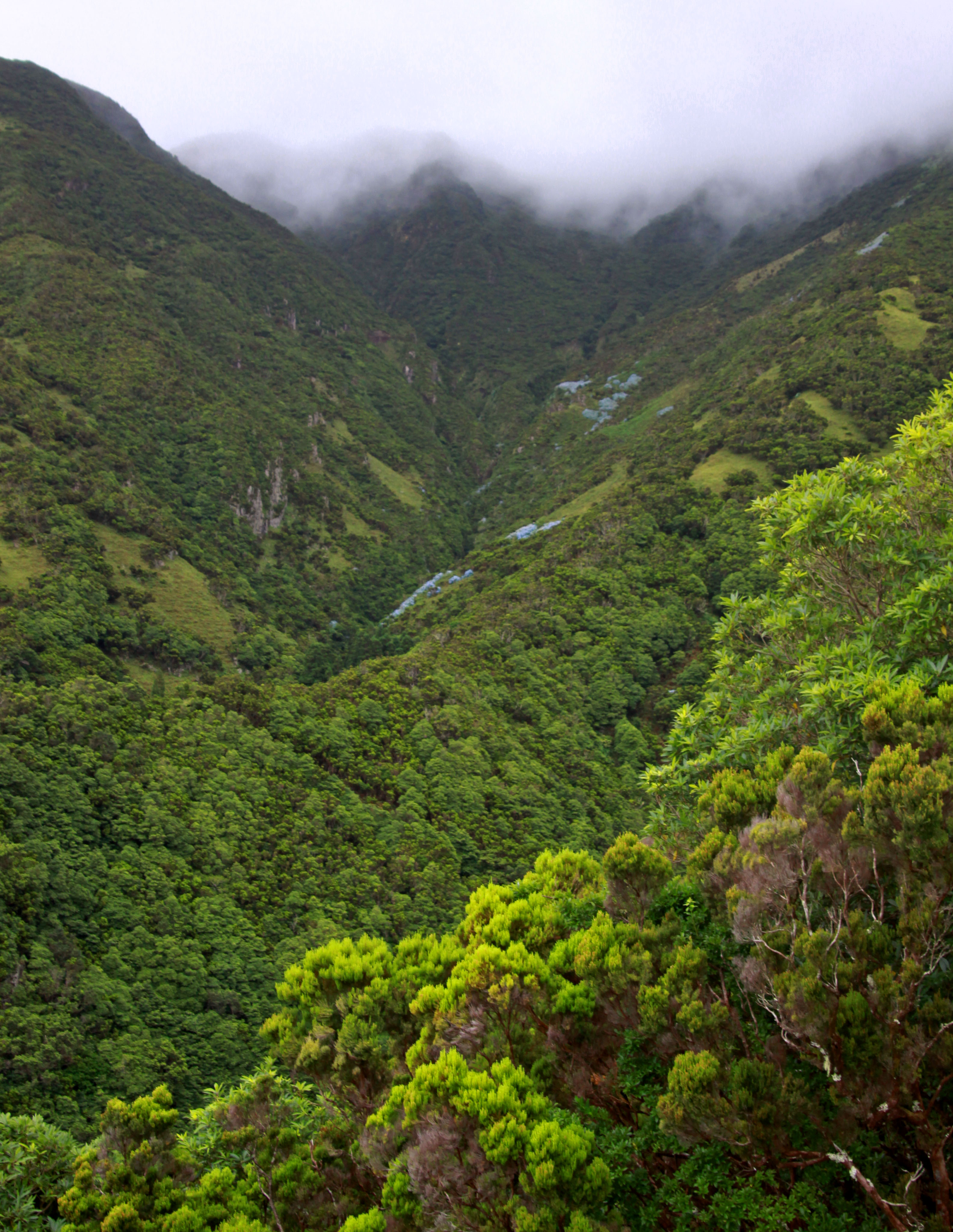
Human impact on the native flora of São Jorge can be seen by the hydrangeas (blue markings) and Pittosporum undulatum (centre-right)

Even though the Azores look very green and sometimes wild, the vegetation has been extremely altered. A great part of it has been wiped out in the past 600 years for its valuable wood (for tools, buildings, boats, fire wood, and so on) and to clear land for agriculture. As a result, it is estimated that more than half of insects on Graciosa have disappeared or will become extinct.

Many cultivated places (which are traditionally dedicated to pasture or to growing taro, potatoes, maize and other crops) have been abandoned, especially as a result of emigration. Consequently, some invasive plants have filled these deserted and disturbed lands. Hydrangeas are another potential pest, but their threat is less serious. Hydrangeas were introduced from America or Asia, but some locals consider them a symbol of the archipelago and propagate them along roadsides. Cryptomeria, the Japanese cedar, is a conifer extensively grown for its timber. The two most common of these alien species are Pittosporum undulatum and Hedychium gardnerianum. Reforestation efforts with native laurissilva vegetation have been accomplished successfully in many parts of the Azores.

There are at least three endemic living bird species. The Azores bullfinch, or Priolo, is restricted to remnant laurisilva forest in the mountains at the eastern end of São Miguel and is classified by BirdLife International as endangered. Monteiro's storm petrel, described to science as recently as 2008, is known to breed in just two locations in the islands but may occur more widely. The Azores chaffinch, formerly considered a subspecies of the common chaffinch, is an abundant and conspicuous resident on all the islands. An extinct species of owl, the São Miguel scops owl, has recently been described, which probably became extinct after human settlement because of habitat destruction and the introduction of alien species. Five species of flightless rail (Rallus spp.) once existed on the islands, as did a flightless quail (Coturnix sp.), a species of gadfly petrel Pterodroma zinorum, and another species of bullfinch, the greater Azores bullfinch, but these also went extinct after human colonization. Eleven subspecies of bird are endemic. The Azores has an endemic bat, the Azores noctule, which has an unusually high frequency of diurnal flight.

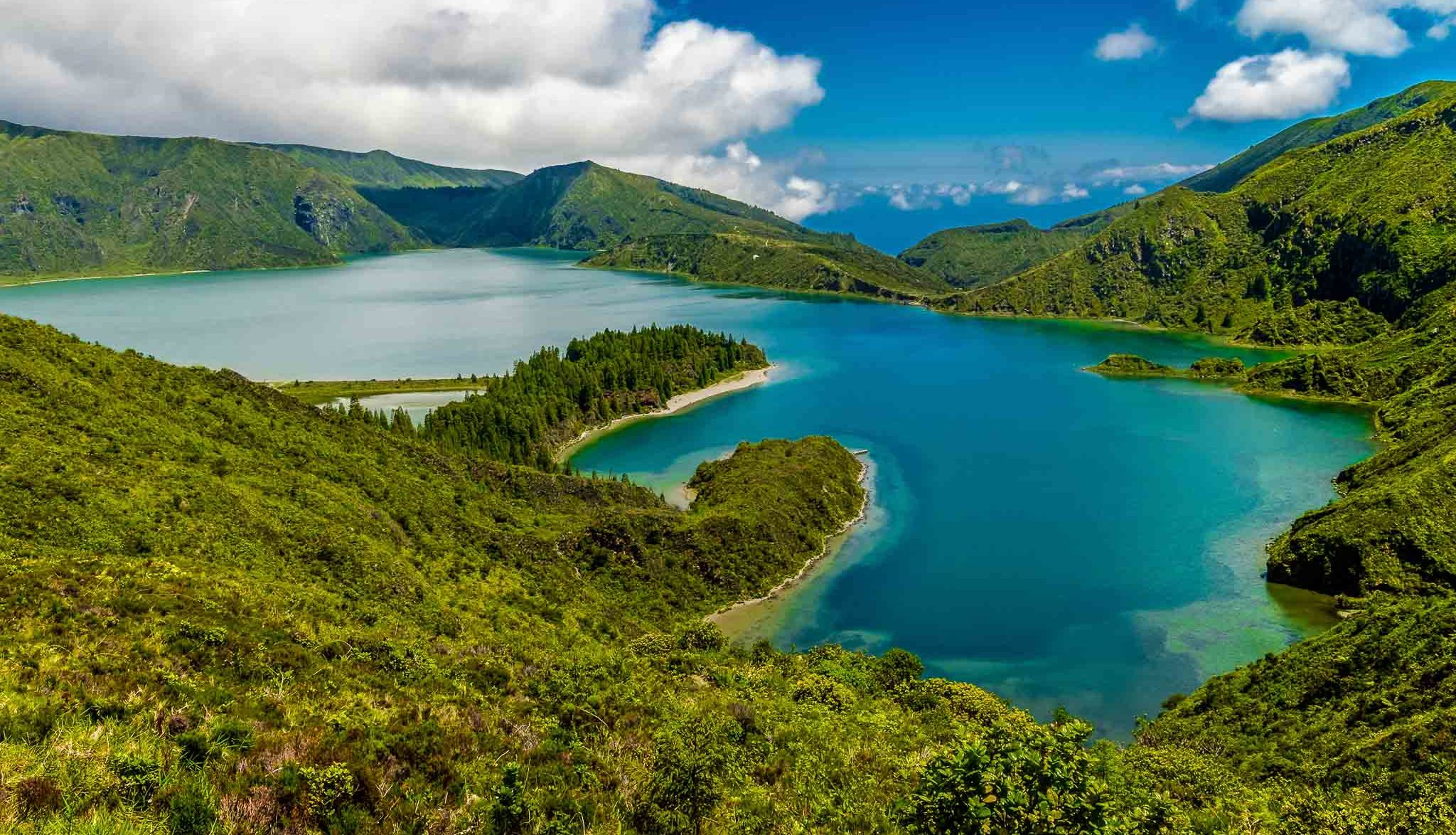
Lagoa do Fogo on São Miguel Island

The islets of the Formigas (the Portuguese word for "ants"), including the area known as the Dollabarat Reef, have a rich environment of maritime species, such as black coral and manta rays, different species of sharks, whales, and sea turtles. Seventeen marine reserves (with special conservation status) were added to the Azorean Marine Park (which covers around 900,000 km^{2} (350,000 sq mi)). On São Miguel there are notable micro-habitats formed by hot springs that host extremophile microorganisms.

=== Climate ===
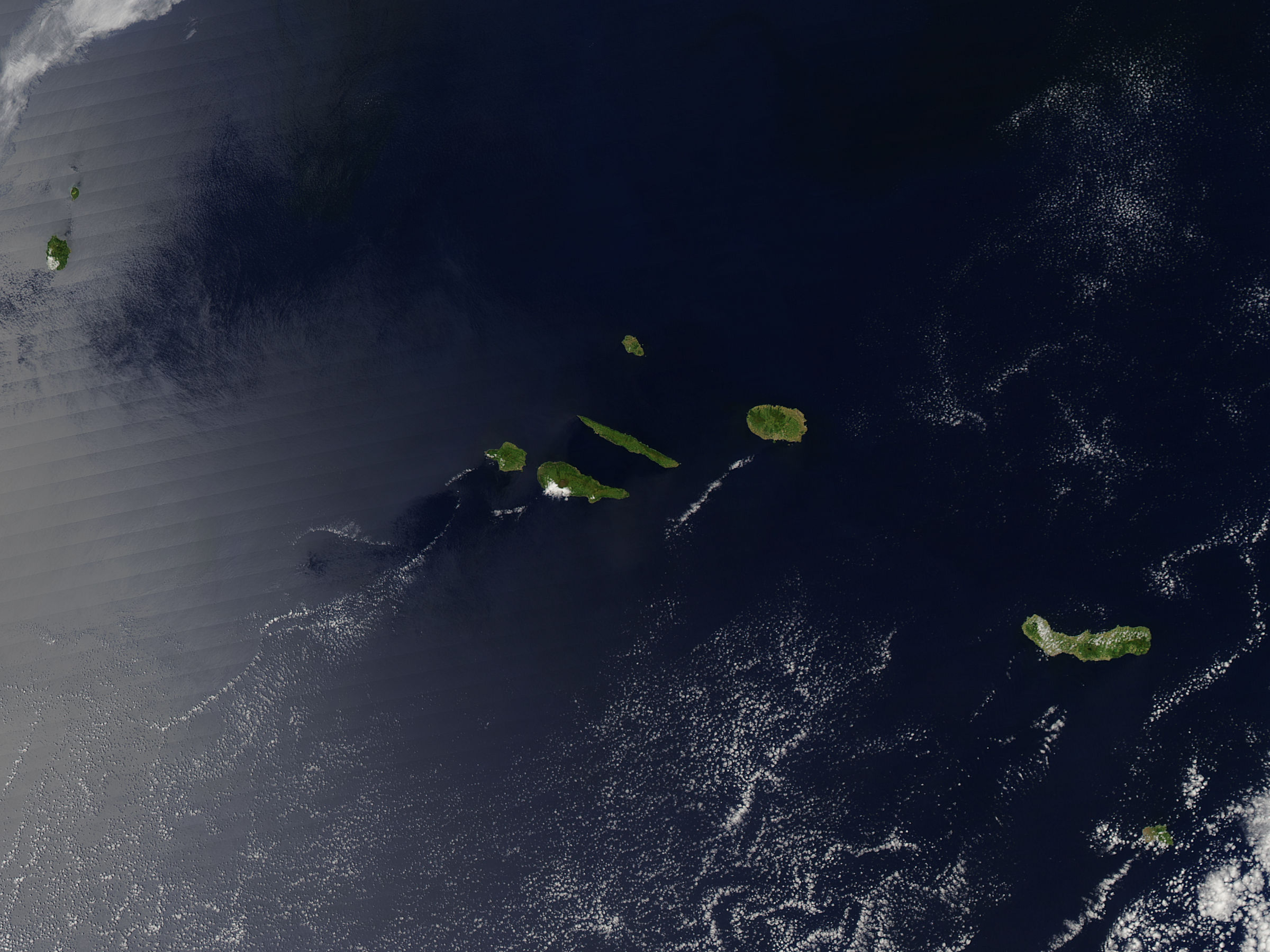
Partly cloudy conditions over the eastern and central groups; in this photo taken on 17 June 2013.

The archipelago is spread out at roughly the same latitude as the southern half of mainland Portugal, but its location in the mid-Atlantic Ocean gives it a generally tepid, oceanic, mild to warm subtropical climate, with mild annual oscillations.

==== 'Azores High' anticyclone ====
The Azores archipelago is located in a transition and confrontation zone between air masses of tropical origin and masses of cooler air of polar origin. The climate is largely determined by variations in the atmospheric pressure field over the North Atlantic. These variations, conditioned by the mass of the American continent and the Atlantic water mass, are overlapped by a semi-permanent subtropical Atlantic anticyclone, commonly known as the Azores High. This anticyclone experiences seasonal variations which can affect the archipelago in many ways.

In winter, the Azores High is positioned further south and allows for a descent of the Polar front, approaching it to the archipelago. In summer, the anticyclone's movement further north leads to the departure towards higher latitudes of the polar front and its associated disturbances. Far enough away from the mainland coasts, the continental air masses that reach the archipelago are weakened by the maritime influence.

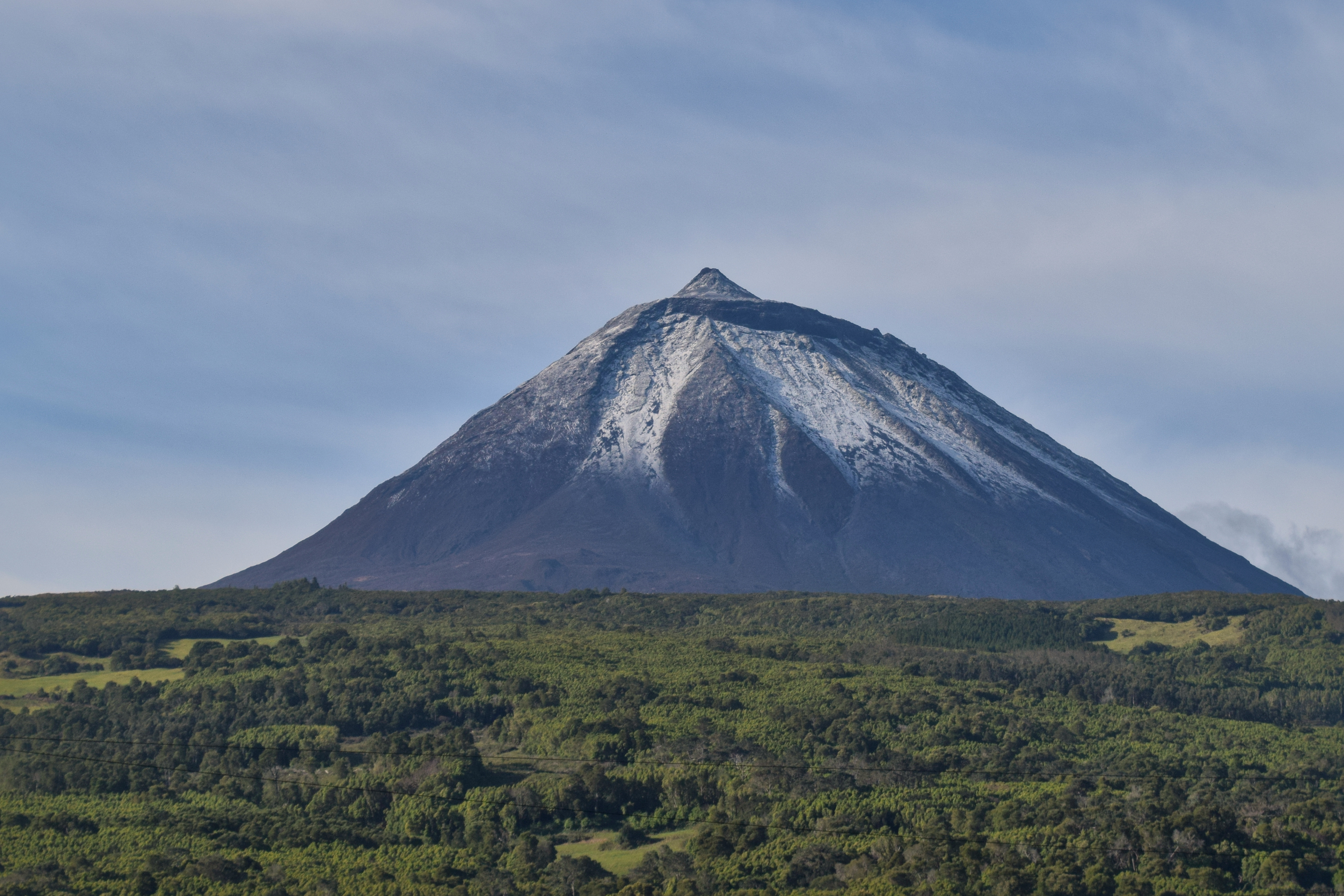
Mount Pico covered with snow.

The same cannot be said for the higher altitudes (e.g. Mount Pico), where upper air masses of continental origin and with a more direct pathway can reach the surface and present those areas with drier air and more extreme temperatures. At the same time, this free atmosphere circulating air transports aerosols to the archipelago, namely volcanic ash or fine sands from the Sahara desert, which sporadically affect the radiation and air quality.

Daily maximum temperatures at low altitudes usually range between 16 and 25 °C (61 and 77 °F). The average annual rainfall generally increases from east to west, ranging from 700 mm (28 in) in Santa Maria to 1,600 mm (63 in) in Flores and reaching values above 5,000 mm (200 in) on the highlands of Pico.

==== Köppen classification ====
Köppen map of Azores

Under the Köppen climate classification, the Eastern Group is usually classified as Mediterranean while the Central and Western Groups (especially Flores and Corvo) are more humid subtropical and overall rainier because of the effects of the Gulf Stream. This stream has a large effect over the sea temperature which varies between 16 °C (61 °F) in February and March, and 23 °C (73 °F) in August and September, and increases earlier in the Western Group.

Salvador Rivas-Martínez's data presents several different bioclimatic zones for the Azores. Seasonal lag is extreme in the low-sun half of the year, with December being milder than April in terms of mean temperatures. During summer the lag is somewhat lower, with August being the warmest month, though September is usually as warm or warmer than July.

==== Temperatures, humidity, and sunshine ====
Although temperatures as warm as 32.1 °C (89.8 °F) have been recorded on Pico, neither Ponta Delgada nor Angra do Heroísmo have ever been warmer than 30 °C (86 °F). No snowfall or temperatures below 0 °C (32 °F) have been recorded at sea level on any of the islands. The coldest weather in winter usually comes from northwesterly air masses originating from eastern Canada. However, since those air masses are warmed up as they pass across the warmer Atlantic Ocean, temperatures by day even then exceed 10 °C (50 °F).

The average relative humidity can range from 80% at the coast to over 90% above 400 m (1,300 ft). However, higher elevations above the planetary boundary layer can experience extremely low values close to 10%. Summers are especially humid in August and may increase the perceived temperature by a few degrees. Winters are not only very mild but also very humid and contribute substantially to the annual precipitation.

Insolation is relatively low, with 35–40% of the total possible value for sunshine, and higher in topographically lower islands such as Graciosa or Santa Maria, inversely proportional to precipitation. This is directly caused by the orographic lift of humid air masses and is especially pronounced in islands marked by high orography.

Flores Airport, Flores

Climate chart (precipitation, max. and min. temperature)
J	F	M	A	M	J	J	A	S	O	N	D
- █ Average max. and min. temperatures in °C
- █ Precipitation totals in mm
Imperial conversion
J	F	M	A	M	J	J	A	S	O	N	D
- █ Average max. and min. temperatures in °F
- █ Precipitation totals in inches

Horta, Faial

Climate chart (precipitation, max. and min. temperature)
J	F	M	A	M	J	J	A	S	O	N	D
- █ Average max. and min. temperatures in °C
- █ Precipitation totals in mm
Imperial conversion
J	F	M	A	M	J	J	A	S	O	N	D
- █ Average max. and min. temperatures in °F
- █ Precipitation totals in inches

Santa Maria Airport, Santa Maria

Climate chart (precipitation, max. and min. temperature)
J	F	M	A	M	J	J	A	S	O	N	D
- █ Average max. and min. temperatures in °C
- █ Precipitation totals in mm
Imperial conversion
J	F	M	A	M	J	J	A	S	O	N	D
- █ Average max. and min. temperatures in °F
- █ Precipitation totals in inches

==== Hurricanes ====
Despite the northern position that the archipelago occupies, the Azores can be affected by the passage of tropical cyclones, or tropical storms derived from them. Some can result from anomalies of low latitude systems, while others result from the return to the Atlantic after a route close to or even over the American continent. Though often small and in the process of dissipation, these cyclones result in many of the worst storms the archipelago is subject to.

A total of 14 tropical or subtropical cyclones have affected the region in history. Most of them were either extratropical or tropical storms when they affected the region, although several Category 1 hurricanes have reached the Azores.

The following storms have impacted the region while at Category 1 strength:

- Hurricane Fran in 1973
- Hurricane Emmy in 1976
- Hurricane Gordon in 2006
- Hurricane Gordon in 2012
- Hurricane Alex in 2016

Several tropical or subtropical storms have hit the region, including:

- Tropical Storm Irma in 1978
- Hurricane Bonnie in 1992
- Hurricane Charley in 1992
- Hurricane Erika in 1997
- Unnamed subtropical cyclone in 2005
- Hurricane Gaston in 2016
- Tropical Storm Gaston in 2022
- Subtropical Storm Patty in 2024
- Hurricane Gabrielle in 2025

Storms that were extratropical when they impacted the region include:

- Hurricane Tanya in 1995
- Tropical Storm Ana in 2003
- Tropical Storm Grace in 2009

== Economy ==
In order of importance, the main sectors of employment are services, agriculture, fishery, industry and tourism. Agricultural products include São Jorge cheese. As of 2024, GDP stood at €5.8 billion, with a GDP per capita of €23,836, 88% of Portugal's average and 60% of the EU27 average.

=== Sustainability ===
The Azores are committed to sustainable tourism and have implemented various policies to preserve their natural, historical, and cultural resources. This approach has led to the designation of approximately 25% of the land area as protected areas for conservation and the establishment of vast marine reserves. Key to the sustainability policy is the integration and participation of all societal members, ensuring equal opportunities in various sectors like health, social solidarity, education, culture, and employment. The harmony between people and nature is considered vital for sustainable development, enhancing the quality of life for residents and visitors.

The Azores Destination Management Organisation, established in 2018, plays a crucial role in coordinating these sustainability efforts with public and private sectors, NGOs, and local communities. The policy aims to position the Azores as a leading sustainable tourist destination, aligning with the Sustainable Development Goals and gaining certification with the EarthCheck Sustainable Destinations program. All with a focus on continuous improvement, prioritising the involvement of local communities and stakeholders in decision-making, and promoting sustainability across the tourism sector.

=== Transport ===
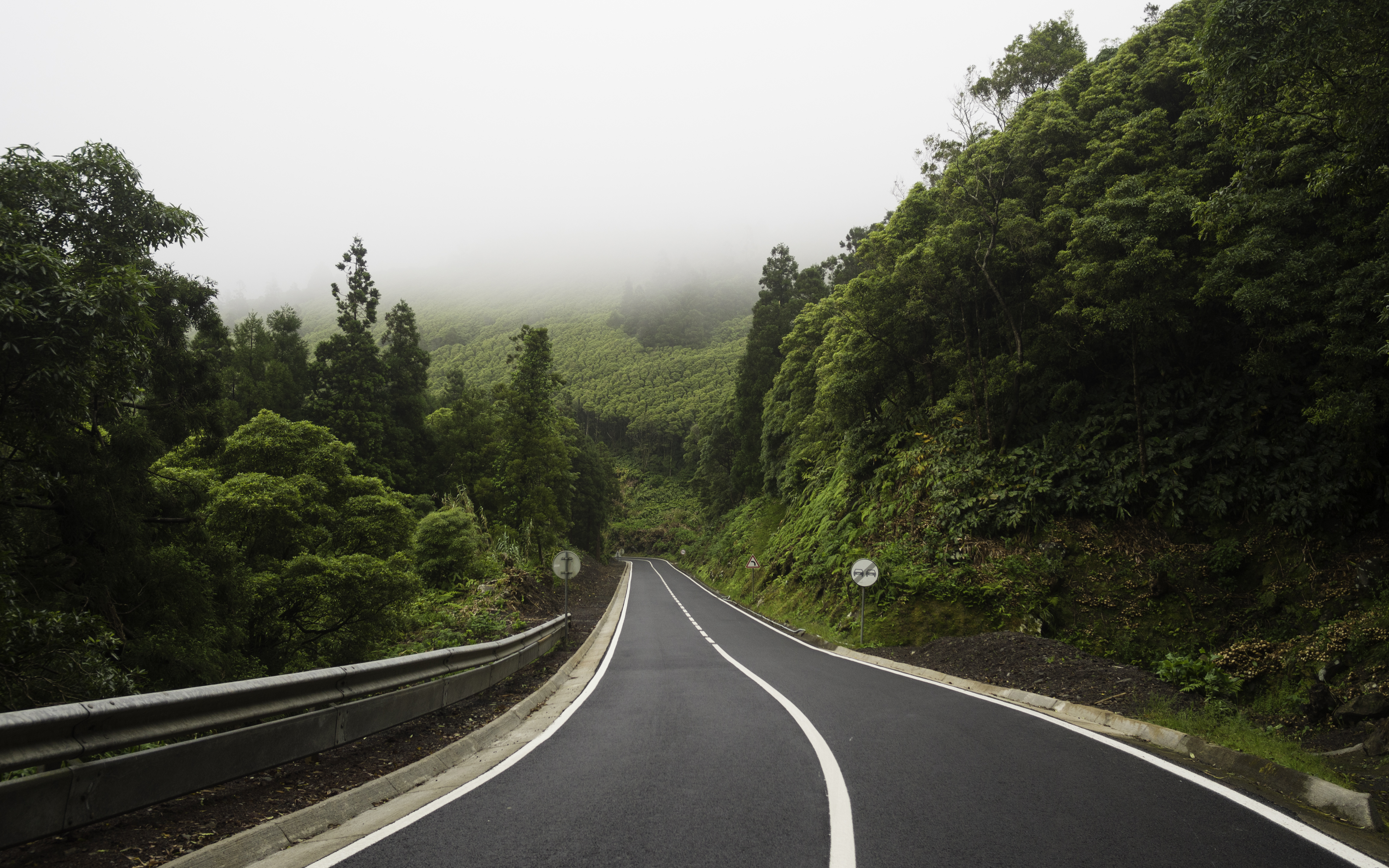
Country road on Flores Island

==== Aviation ====
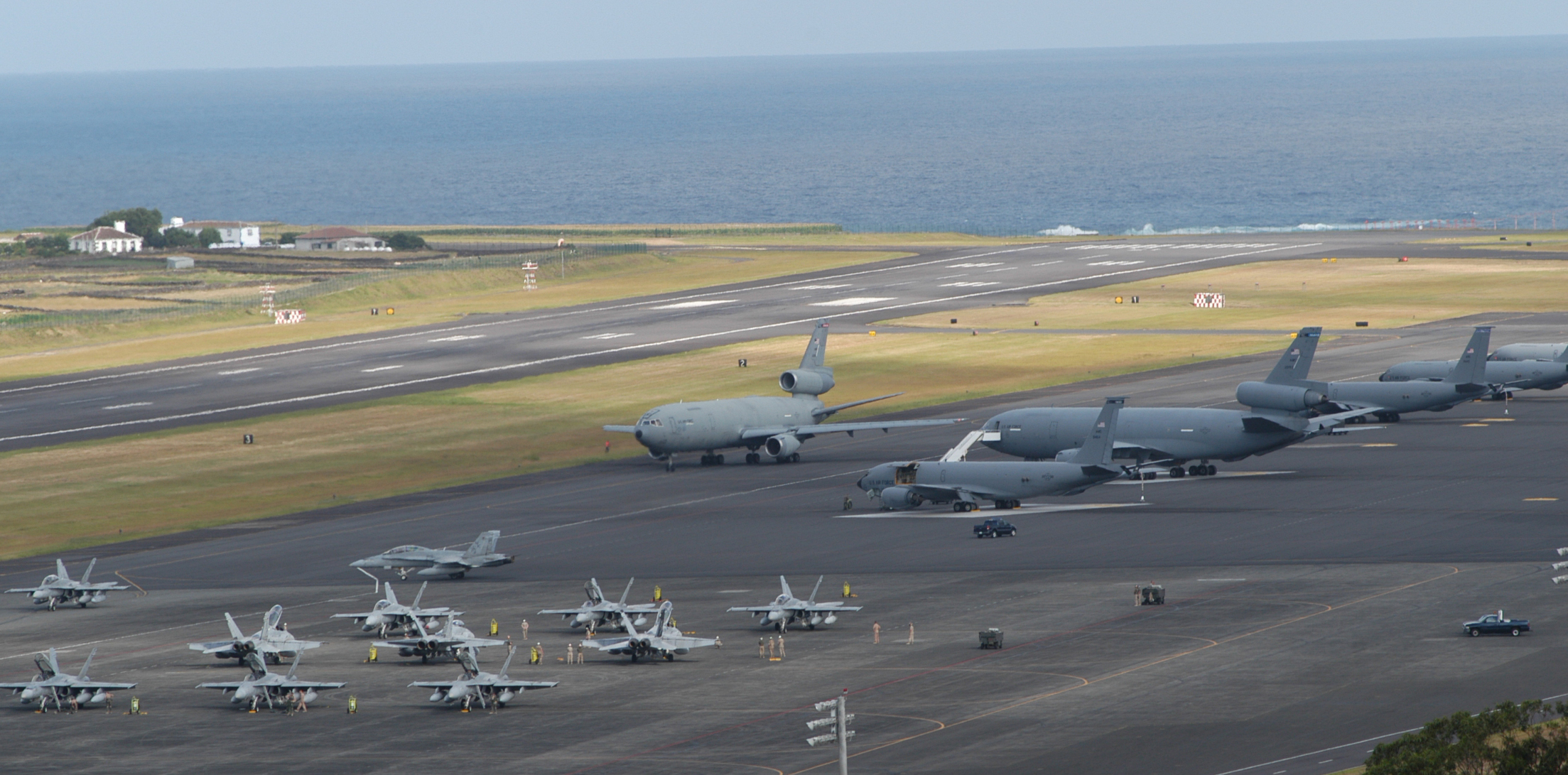
Lajes Air Base, on Terceira Island, is a joint Portuguese Air Force and United States Air Force military base.

Each of the nine islands has an airport, although the majority are airfields rather than airports. The full list of airports is:

- Santa Maria: Santa Maria Airport (LPAZ)
- São Miguel: João Paulo II Airport (LPPD)
- Terceira: Lajes Airport (LPLA)
- São Jorge: São Jorge Airport (LPSJ)
- Pico: Pico Airport (LPPI)
- Faial: Horta Airport (LPHR)
- Graciosa: Graciosa Airport (LPGR)
- Flores: Flores Airport (LPFL)
- Corvo: Corvo Airport (LPCR)

The primary (and busiest) airport of the island group is João Paulo II Airport. The commercial terminals at João Paulo II, Horta, Santa Maria and Flores airports are operated by ANA – Aeroportos de Portugal, a public entity that oversees the operations of airports across Portugal. The remaining, except for Lajes Airport, are operated by the Regional Government. Lajes is a military airbase, as well as a commercial airport, and is operated by the Portuguese Armed Forces in conjunction with the United States.

==== Marine transportation ====
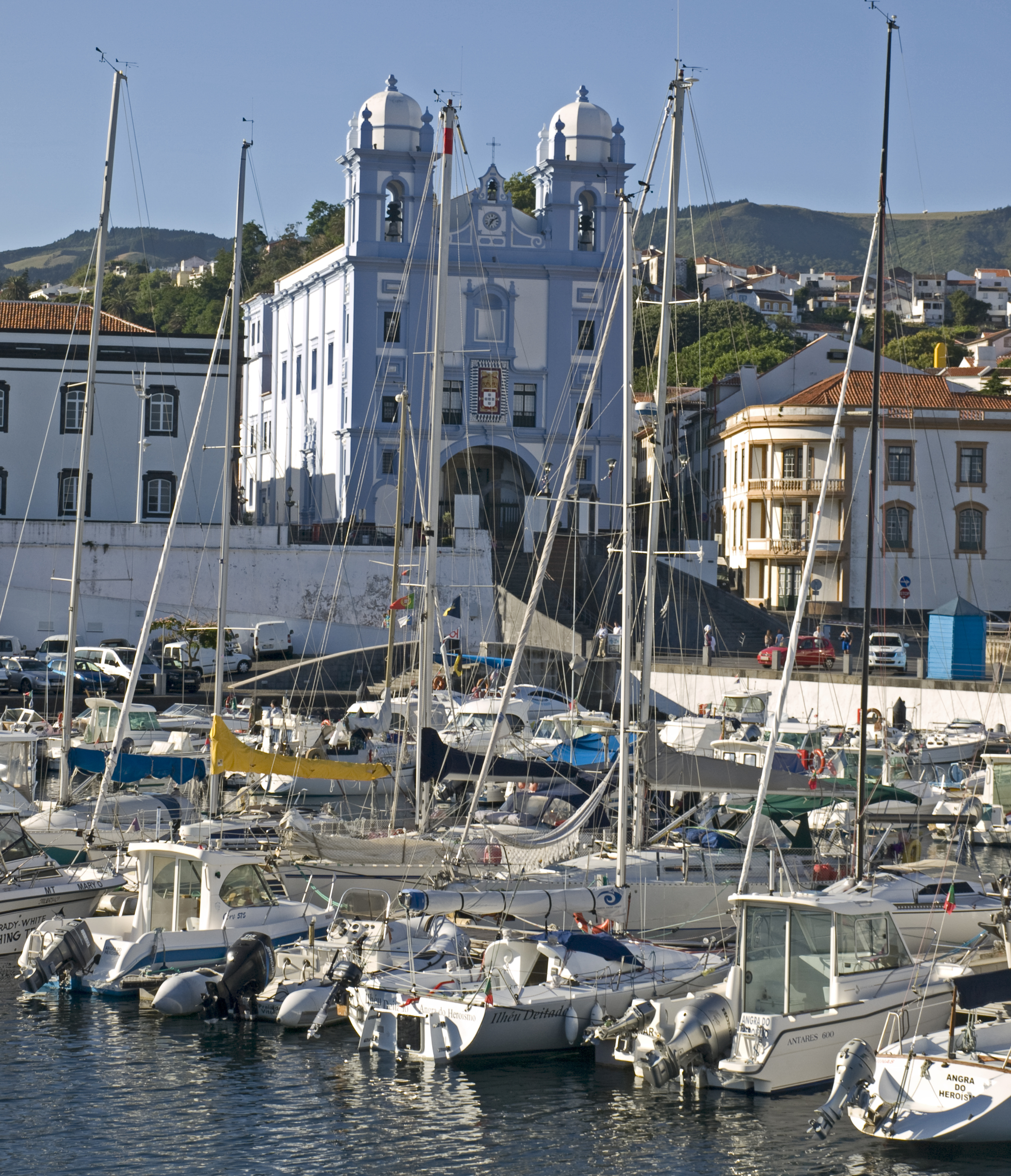
Marina of Angra do Heroísmo

The Azores has had a long history of marine transport to overcome distances and establish inter-community contacts and trade. Consequently, the shipbuilding industry developed in many islands, from small fishing boats to whaling sloops and larger passenger services. Passenger traffic to the main islands (São Miguel, Santa Maria, Terceira and Faial) began in the 17th century, and between the 18th–19th century, the Pico Yacht controlled the lucrative summer traffic season. After 1871, the Insulana Shipping Company was the only entity responsible for regular traffic between the islands (except Corvo), Madeira and the United States. Cargo and passenger transportation ceased in the 1970s, and the ships were sold or converted into tuna fishing boats. For the next 20 years, commercial maritime service between the islands ceased (except between Faial-Pico and Lajes das Flores-Vila do Corvo).

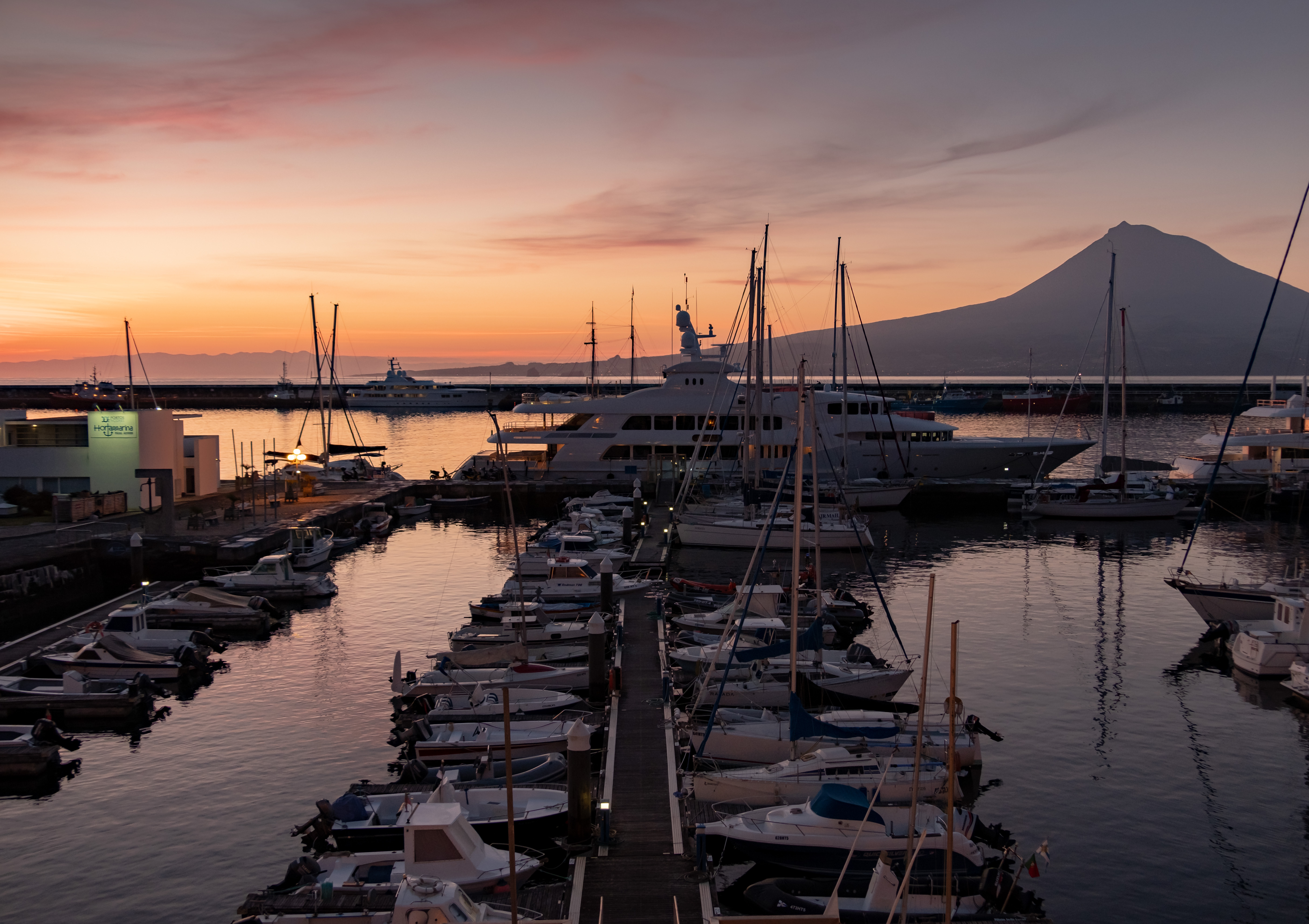
The port of Horta is famed worldwide as a trans-Atlantic stop for yachts and sailors.

Transmaçor (Transportes Marítimos Açorianos, Lda.) was founded in 1987. The shipping company operates four to six daily connections between Horta and Madalena throughout the year, using its small fleet of ships, in addition to inter-island connections between Faial, Pico, São Jorge and Terceira during the summer months. New initiatives began in the late 1990s: the catamaran Iapetos began services, followed by Lady of Mann and Golfinho Azul (chartered by Açorline).

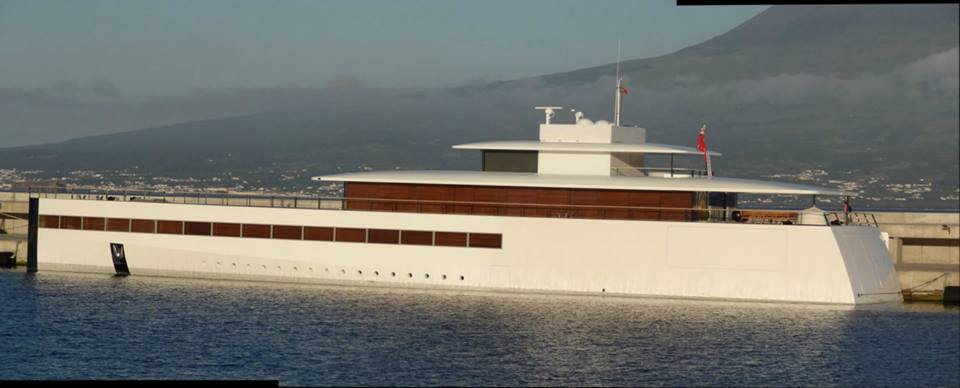
Steve Jobs's yacht Venus at Horta Marina

In 2005, Atlânticoline was established, providing transport services. In 2009, Atlanticoline was involved in a controversial rejection of a 750-passenger, 150-vehicle ship ordered from the Estaleiros de Viana do Castelo (ENVC). The Atlantida, a 50 million Euro cruiser (as part of a two-ship deal with the other named Anticiclone) was rejected in 2009 by Atlanticoline for the under-performance of the power-plant. Although it would result in only a five-minute delay between islands, the public company rejected the ship, and the contract was broken over the builder's inability to deliver the required ship on time. While the ship was being shopped to other interested parties (Hugo Chávez once considered purchasing the ferryboat in 2010), no interested buyers appeared, and ENVC decided to cede the Atlantida to Atlânticoline as part of the latter's open international competition to charter two ships in 2012.

In June 2011, the Regional Government announced that it would purchase 60% of Transmaçor, equivalent to 500,000 Euro of the company's capital. With this transaction the government took control of 88% of the capital of the company. The signed memorandum of understanding concluded negotiations between the various parties involved, under which the liability of Transmaçor (worth a total of 8 million Euro) was divided equally between the government and businessman José E. Almeida, who was previously the holder of a majority stake in the company. Similarly, the Regional Government approved the consolidation of the three individual port authorities (Administração dos Portos do Triângulo e Grupo Ocidental, Administração dos Portos da Terceira e Graciosa and the Administração dos Portos das Ilhas de São Miguel e Santa Maria) and regional Portos dos Açores into one entity that resulted in a 2.2 million Euro cost savings, in addition to a reduction from 11 to three administrators.

== Demographics ==
Historical population
Year	Pop.	±%
1864	249,135	—
1878	263,305	+5.7%
1890	255,487	−3.0%
1900	256,673	+0.5%
1911	242,941	−5.3%
1920	231,543	−4.7%
1930	255,464	+10.3%
1940	287,080	+12.4%
1950	318,459	+10.9%
1960	327,476	+2.8%
1970	289,096	−11.7%
1981	243,410	−15.8%
1991	237,795	−2.3%
2001	241,763	+1.7%
2011	246,772	+2.1%
2021	236,413	−4.2%

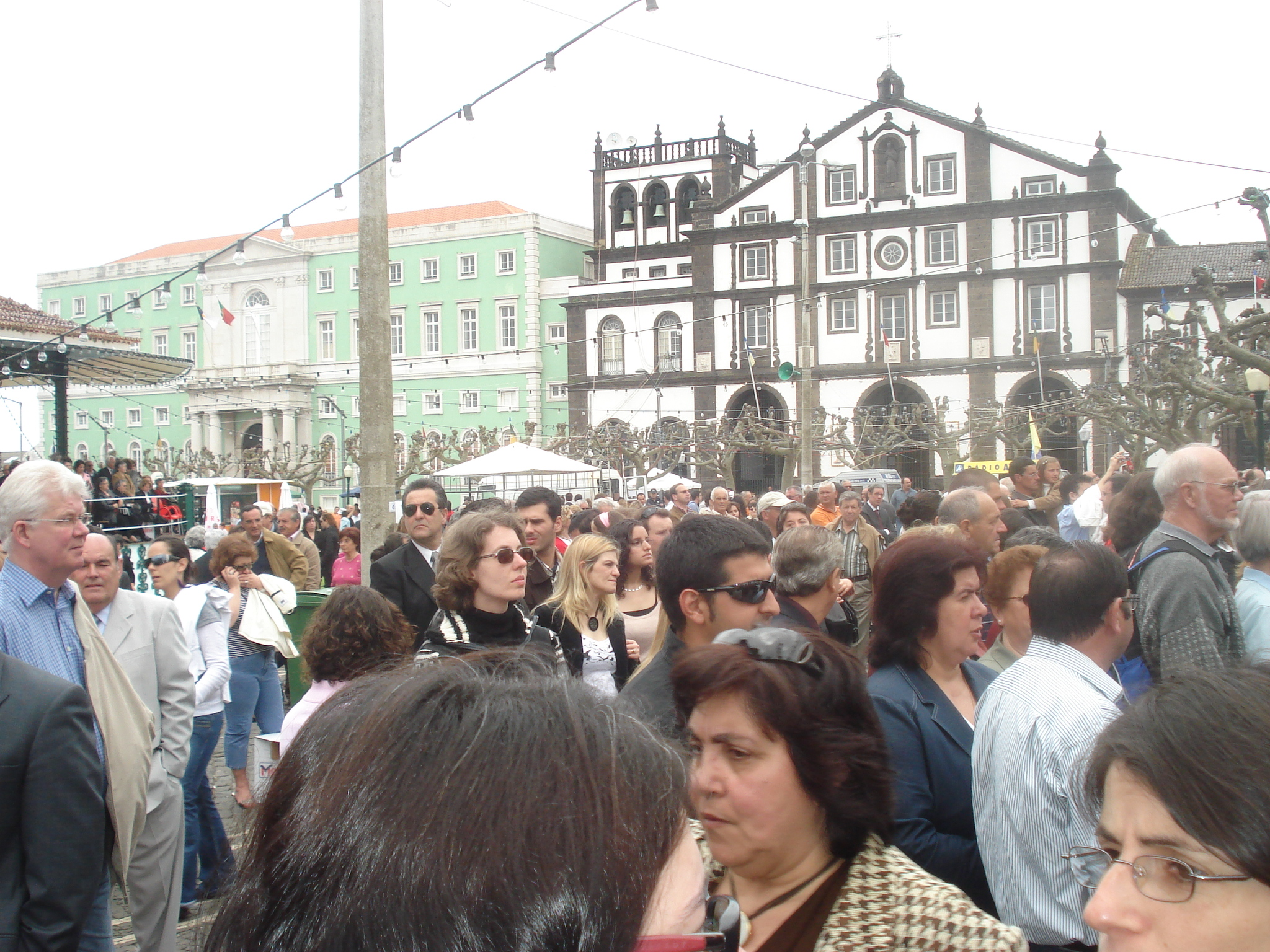
Azoreans during a religious festival

The Azores are divided into 19 municipalities (concelhos); each municipality is further divided into freguesias (civil administrative parishes), of which there is a total of 156 in all of the Azores.

There are six cities (cidades): Ponta Delgada, Lagoa and Ribeira Grande on São Miguel; Angra do Heroísmo and Praia da Vitória on Terceira, and Horta on Faial. Three of these, Ponta Delgada, Angra and Horta are considered capital/administrative cities to the regional government: homes to the president (Ponta Delgada), the judiciary (Angra) and the Regional Assembly (Horta). Angra also serves as the ecclesiastical centre of the Roman Catholic Diocese of Angra, the episcopal see of the Azores.

Island	Group	Population		Municipalities of the Azores		Main Settlement
Island	Group	2021	% Total	No	Municipalities (Concelho)	Main Settlement
São Miguel	Eastern	133,295	56.38	6	Lagoa, Nordeste, Ponta Delgada, Povoação, Ribeira Grande, Vila Franca do Campo	Ponta Delgada
Terceira	Central	53,244	22.52	2	Angra do Heroísmo, Praia da Vitória	Angra do Heroísmo
Faial	Central	14,334	6.06	1	Horta	Horta
Pico	Central	13,883	5.87	3	Lajes do Pico, Madalena, São Roque do Pico	Madalena
São Jorge	Central	8,373	3.54	2	Calheta, Velas	Velas
Santa Maria	Eastern	5,408	2.29	1	Vila do Porto	Vila do Porto
Graciosa	Central	4,091	1.73	1	Santa Cruz da Graciosa	Santa Cruz da Graciosa
Flores	Western	3,428	1.45	2	Lajes das Flores, Santa Cruz das Flores	Santa Cruz das Flores
Corvo	Western	384	0.16	1	Vila do Corvo	Vila do Corvo
Total		236,440		19		

=== Population ===
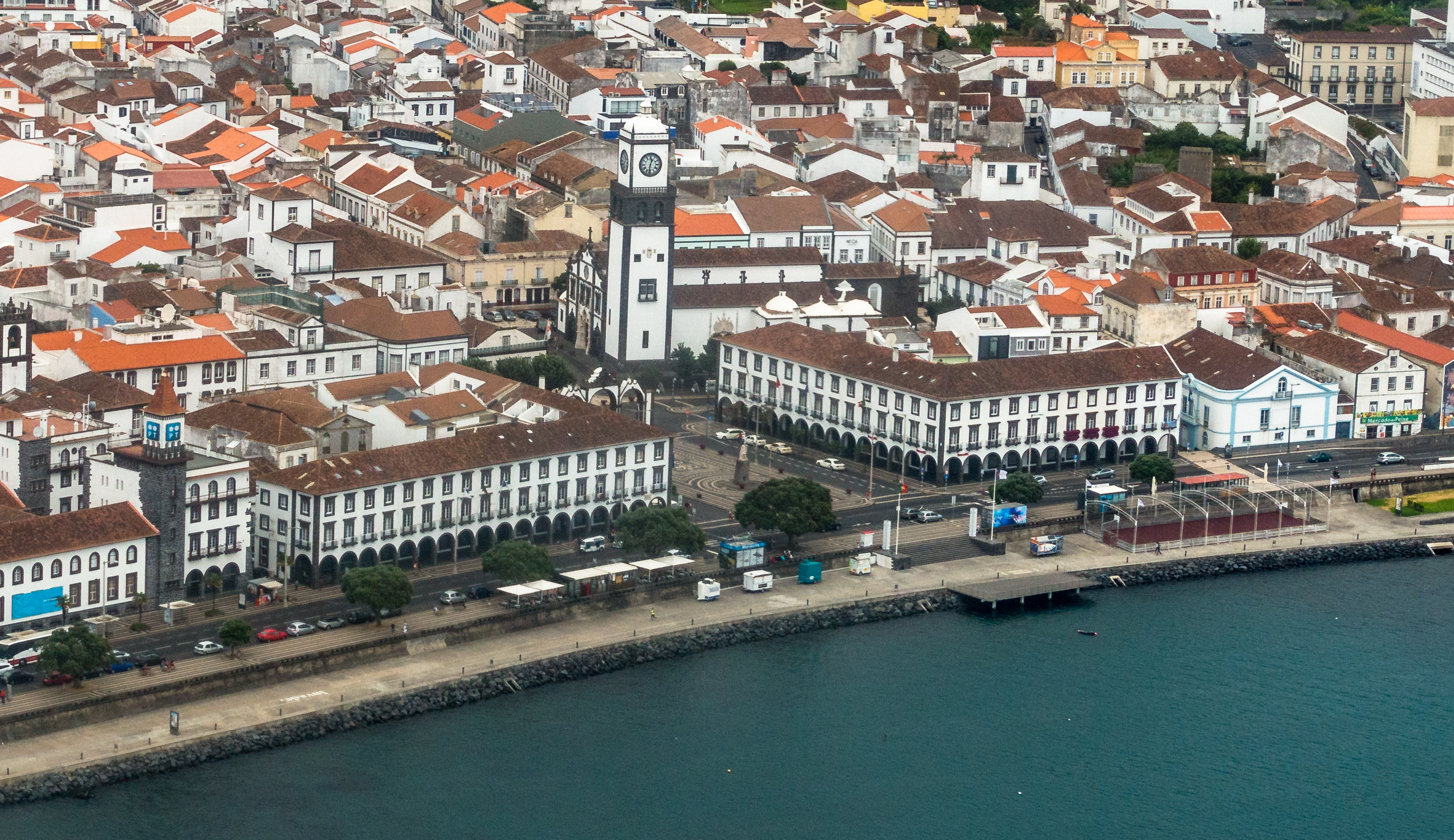
Ponta Delgada, on São Miguel Island, is the largest city in the Azores.

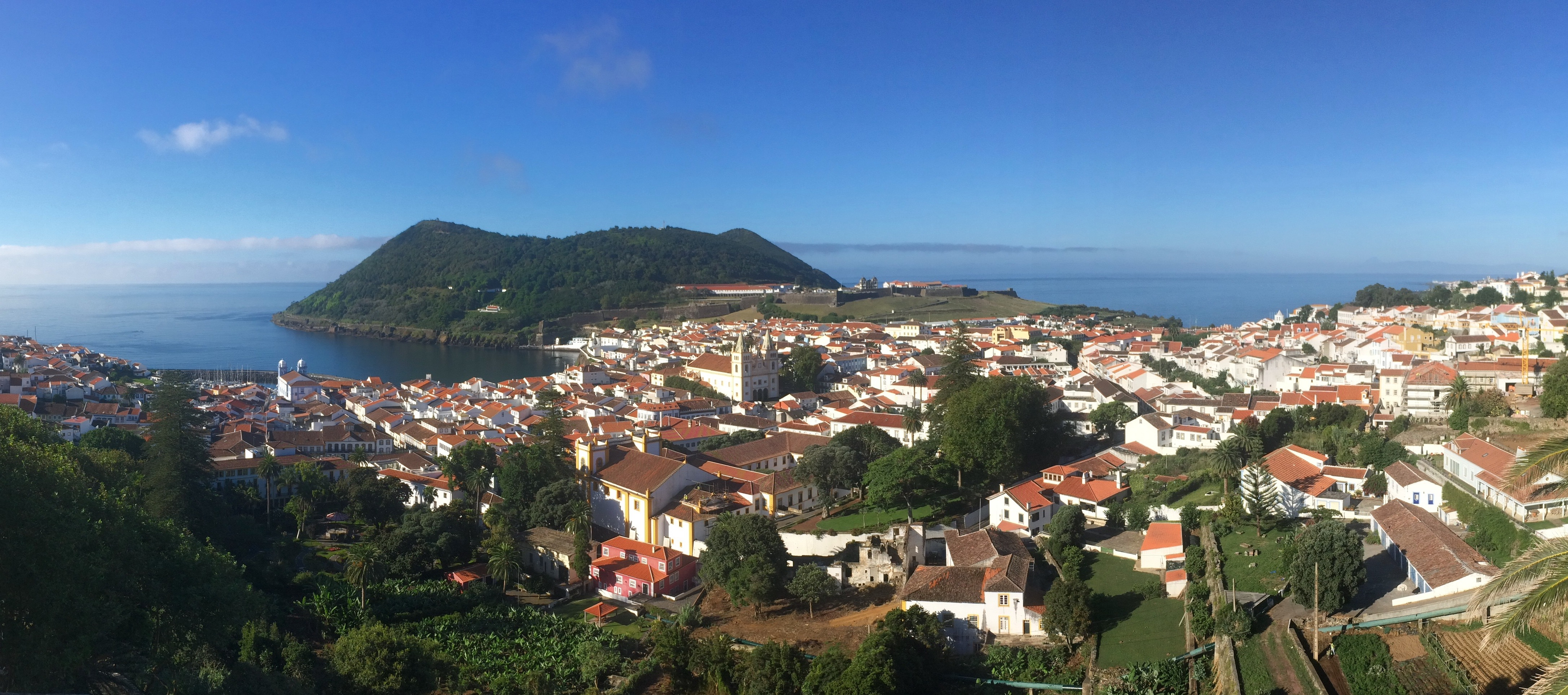
Angra do Heroísmo, on Terceira Island, is UNESCO World Heritage.

According to the 2019 census, population was 242,796. The Azores were uninhabited when Portuguese navigators arrived in the early 15th century; settlement began in 1439 with migrants from mainland Portugal as well as Spaniards, Sephardic Jews, Moors, Italians, Flemings, and Africans from Guinea, Cape Verde and São Tomé and Príncipe. The first Sephardic Jews in the Azores were slaves after their expulsion from Portugal by King Manuel I in 1496. The islands sometimes served as a waypoint for ships carrying African slaves.

=== Emigration ===
Since the 17th century, many Azoreans have emigrated, mainly to Brazil, Uruguay, the United States and Canada. Rhode Island and southeastern Massachusetts are the primary destination for Azorean emigrants. From 1921 to 1977, about 250,000 Azoreans immigrated to Rhode Island and Massachusetts. Many Azoreans established themselves in California in the 19th century. Northern California was the final destination for many of the Massachusetts immigrants who then moved on to the San Joaquin Valley, especially the city of Turlock. The tuna fishing industry drew a significant number of Azoreans to the Point Loma neighborhood of San Diego. In the late 19th century many Azoreans immigrated to the Hawaiian islands. During the Great Recession of the early 21st century, Portugal was in a recession from 2011 until 2013, which resulted in high levels of unemployment across the mainland as well as the Azores. The Great Recession led to an increase of emigration from the Azores.

Florianópolis and Porto Alegre in the Southern Region of Brazil were founded by Azoreans, who accounted for over half of Rio Grande do Sul and Santa Catarina's populations in the late 18th century. As late as 1960, mass immigration currents were registered to Brazil, and many were from the Azores.

== Government and politics ==
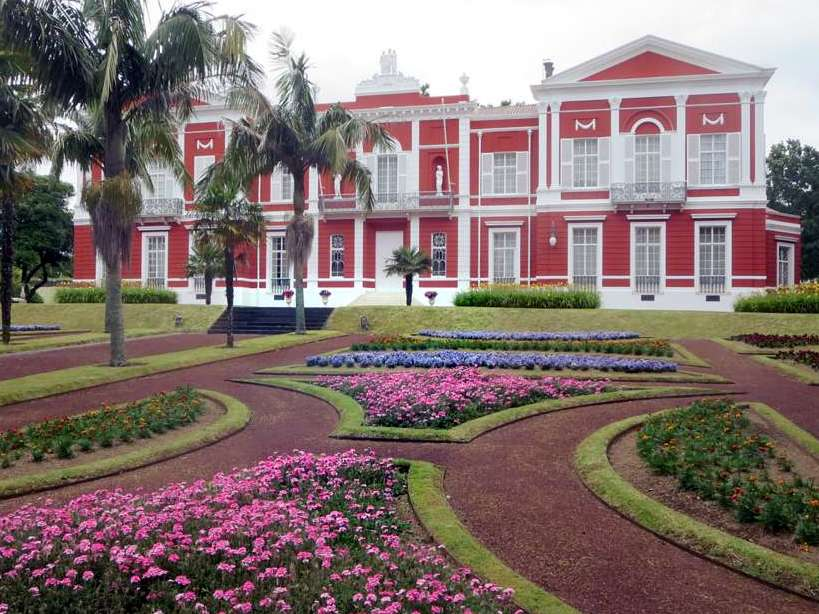
Sant'Ana Palace, Ponta Delgada, São Miguel Island is the seat of the Presidency of the Regional Government of the Azores.

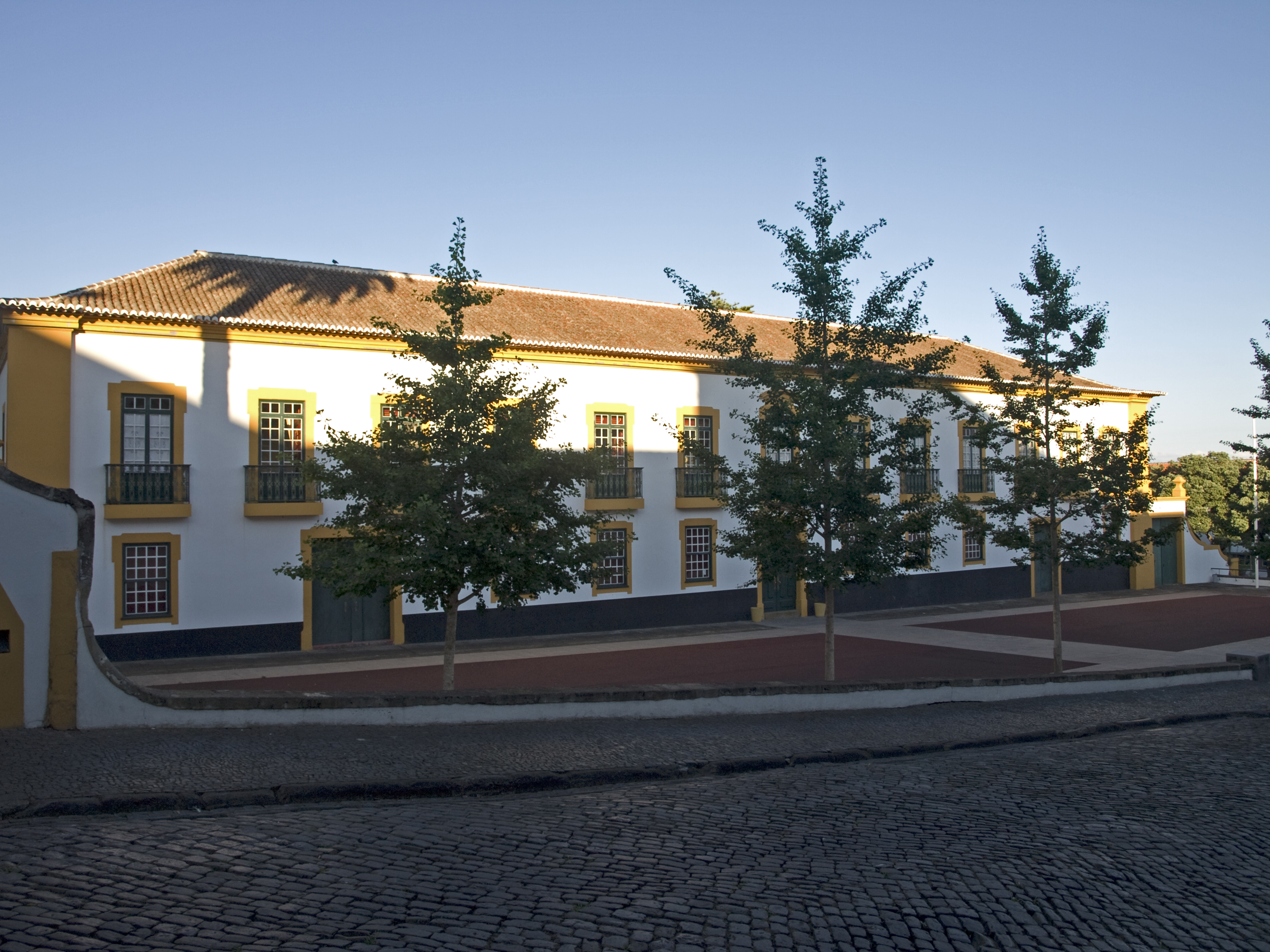
Palace of the Capitães-Generais, Angra do Heroismo, Terceira Island is an official residence of the Azorean Regional Government president.

Since 1976, the Azores has been an autonomous region integrated within the framework of the Portuguese Republic. It has its own regional government and autonomous legislature within its own political-administrative statute and organic law. Its governmental organs include: the Legislative Assembly, a unicameral parliament composed of 52 deputies, elected by universal suffrage for a four-year term; the Regional Government, with parliamentary legitimacy, composed of a president, a vice-president and seven regional secretaries responsible for day-to-day operations. The representative of the Republic represents the President of the Portuguese Republic in the region and is responsible for the appointment of the Regional Government president accordingly with the elections results, for the appointment and exoneration of the other members of the Regional Government by indication of its president and for the signing or exercising the right of veto of the regional laws. The representative of the Republic office was created in the 2004 revision of the Portuguese Constitution, replacing the old office of minister of the Republic which represented the Government of Portugal and was originally a member of the Portuguese cabinet. Since becoming a Portuguese autonomous region, the regional executive branch of government has been located in Ponta Delgada and the legislative branch in Horta. The region does not have its own autonomous judicial branch, instead constituting a comarca (district of a justice court first instance) and a circuit (district of an administrative and tax court of first instance) of the national Judiciary of Portugal, both with seat in Ponta Delgada.

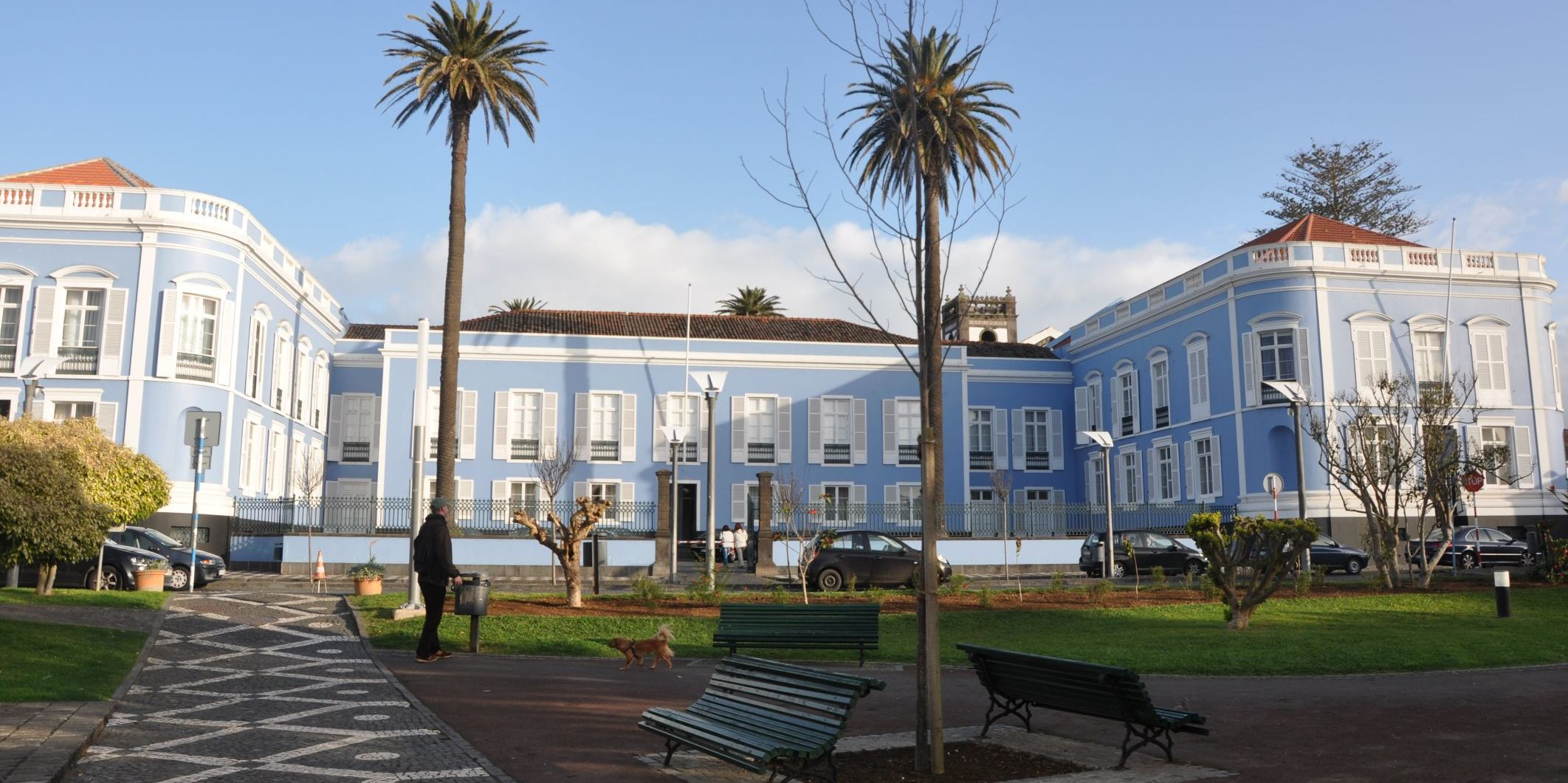
Conceição Palace, Ponta Delgada, São Miguel Island is the headquarters of the Azorean Regional Government.

Each of the islands does not constitute its own administrative division, but constitutes an electoral district of the Azorean Legislative Assembly. The local government in the Azores is assured by the 19 municipalities that subdivide the islands (Corvo is the only island which constitutes a single municipality). Historically and until the administrative reform of the 19th century, there were also the following municipalities: Topo (today integrated into the municipality of Calheta, São Jorge); Praia (today integrated into municipality of Santa Cruz da Graciosa); São Sebastião (today an integral part of the municipality of Angra do Heroísmo); Capelas (now part of the municipality of Ponta Delgada); and Água de Pau (now a civil parish in the municipality of Lagoa). These civil parishes still retain their titles of "vila" in name only; the populations of Capelas and neighbouring parish still protest the change and promote the restoration of their status. The municipalities are further subdivided into several civil parishes, with the exception of Corvo (the only Portuguese municipality by law without a civil parish, owing to its size).

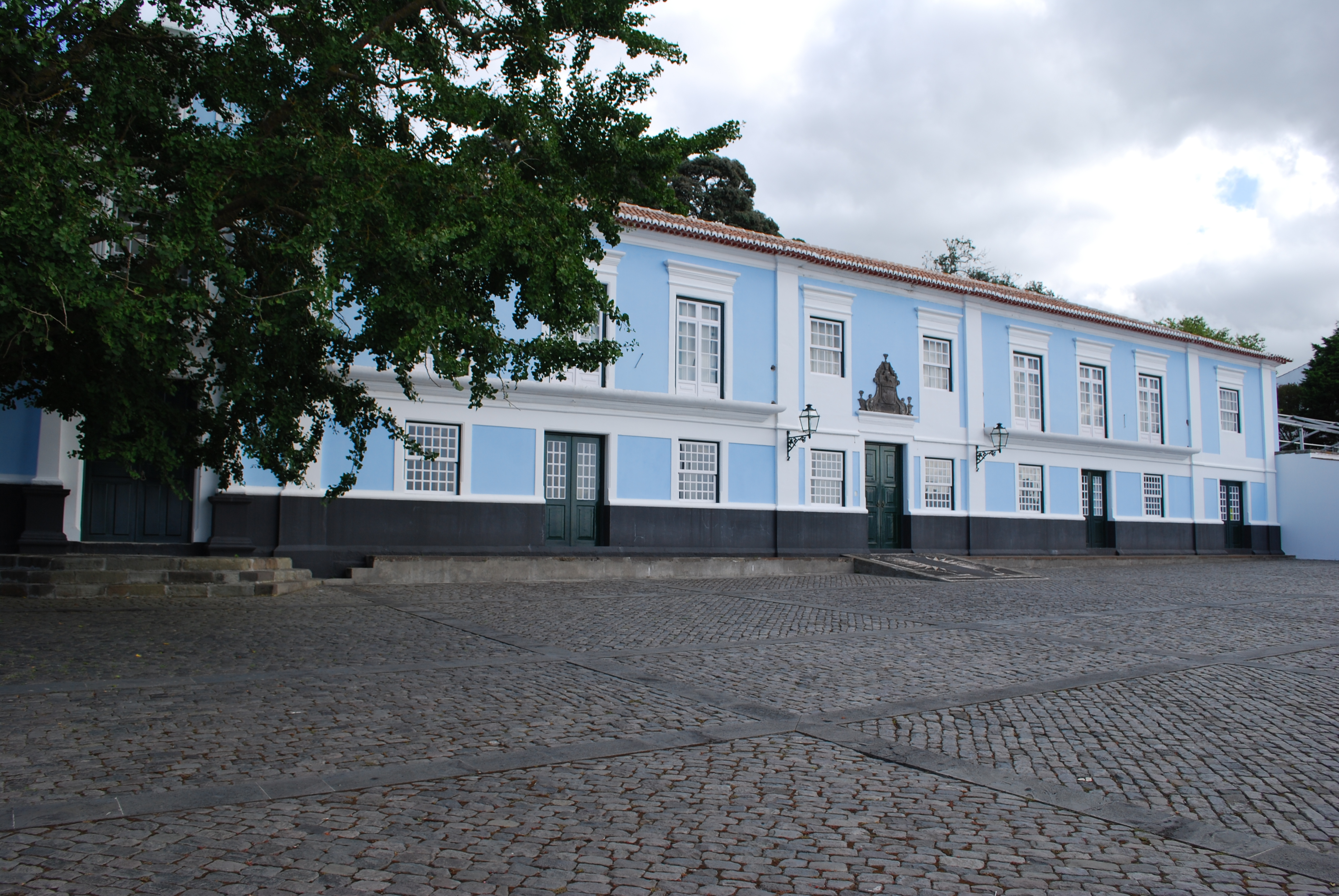
Madre de Deus Manor, Angra do Heroísmo, Terceira Island is the seat of the Representative of the Republic.

Politics is dominated by the two largest Portuguese political parties, the Socialist Party and Social Democratic Party, the former holding a majority in the Legislative Assembly. The Democratic and Social Center / People's Party, the Left Bloc, the Unitary Democratic Coalition and the People's Monarchist Party are also represented. As of the 2020 regional election, the president of the Azores is Social Democratic Party leader José Manuel Bolieiro. Although the Socialist Party dominates the regional politics, the Social Democratic Party is traditionally popular in city and town council elections.

=== Foreign relations and defence ===
As an autonomous but integral region of Portugal, foreign affairs and defence are the responsibility of the national government. As is all of Portugal, the Azores are in the European Union and Schengen Area. They are also in the European Union Customs Union and VAT area but levy a lower rate of VAT than applies on the mainland. The Azores, like Madeira and the Canary Islands, are among the European Union's state territories with special status, and are one of its designated "Outermost Regions".

The Operational Command of the Azores is the Armed Forces of Portugal joint command for the archipelago. The Azores Military Zone is the Portuguese Army's command for ground forces stationed in the archipelago, which include two garrison regiments. The Air Force, in turn, maintains the Azores Air Zone command and the Lajes Air Base, where a squadron of SAR helicopters and a detachment of transport planes are permanently based, as well as regular detachments of maritime patrol aircraft. Under a special agreement between Portugal and the United States, the Lajes Air Base is also home to the United States Forces Azores. The Portuguese Navy maintains the Azores Maritime Zone command, which coordinates Viana do Castelo-class patrol vessels and other naval assets to patrol Portugal's large economic zone around the islands.

== Culture ==
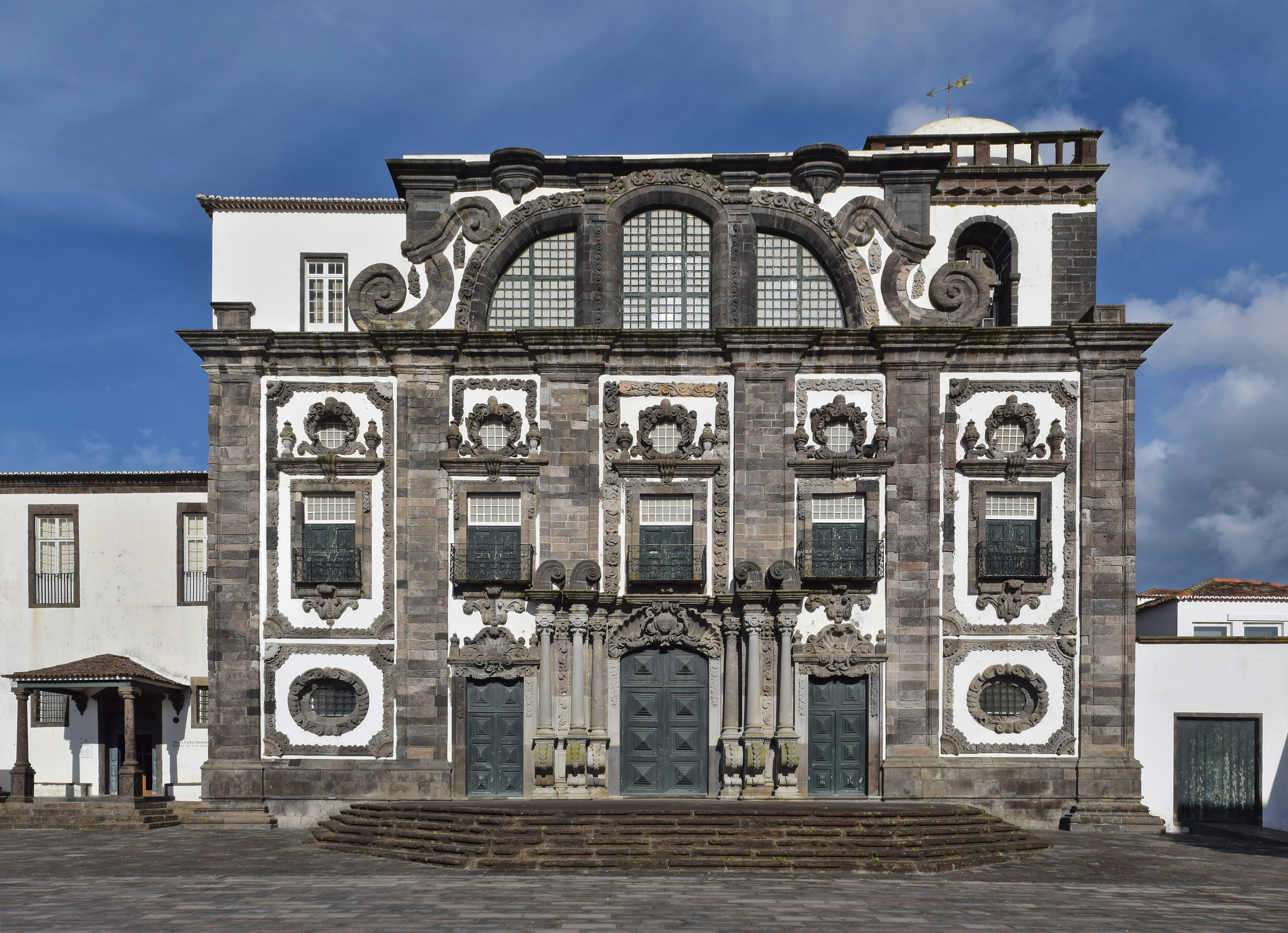
The architecture of the Azores is characterized by the contrast between black volcanic stone and white stucco.

=== Religious societies and festivals ===
Religious festivals, patron saints, and traditional holidays mark the Azorean calendar. The most important religious events are tied with the festivals associated with the cult of the Holy Spirit, commonly referred to as the festivals of the Holy Spirit (or Espírito Santo), rooted in millenarian dogma and held on all islands from May to September. These festivals are very important to the Azorean people, who are primarily Roman Catholic, and combine religious rituals with processions celebrating the benevolence and egalitarianism of neighbours. These events are centred around treatros or impérios, small buildings that host the meals, adoration and charity of the participants, and used to store the artefacts associated with the events. On Terceira, for example, these impérios have grown into ornate buildings painted and cared for by the local brotherhoods in their respective parishes. The events focus on the members of local parishes, not tourists, but all are welcome, as sharing is one of the main principles of the festivals. Some limited events focus on tourists, including a public event that the city government of Ponta Delgada holds, which attracts visitors and locals.

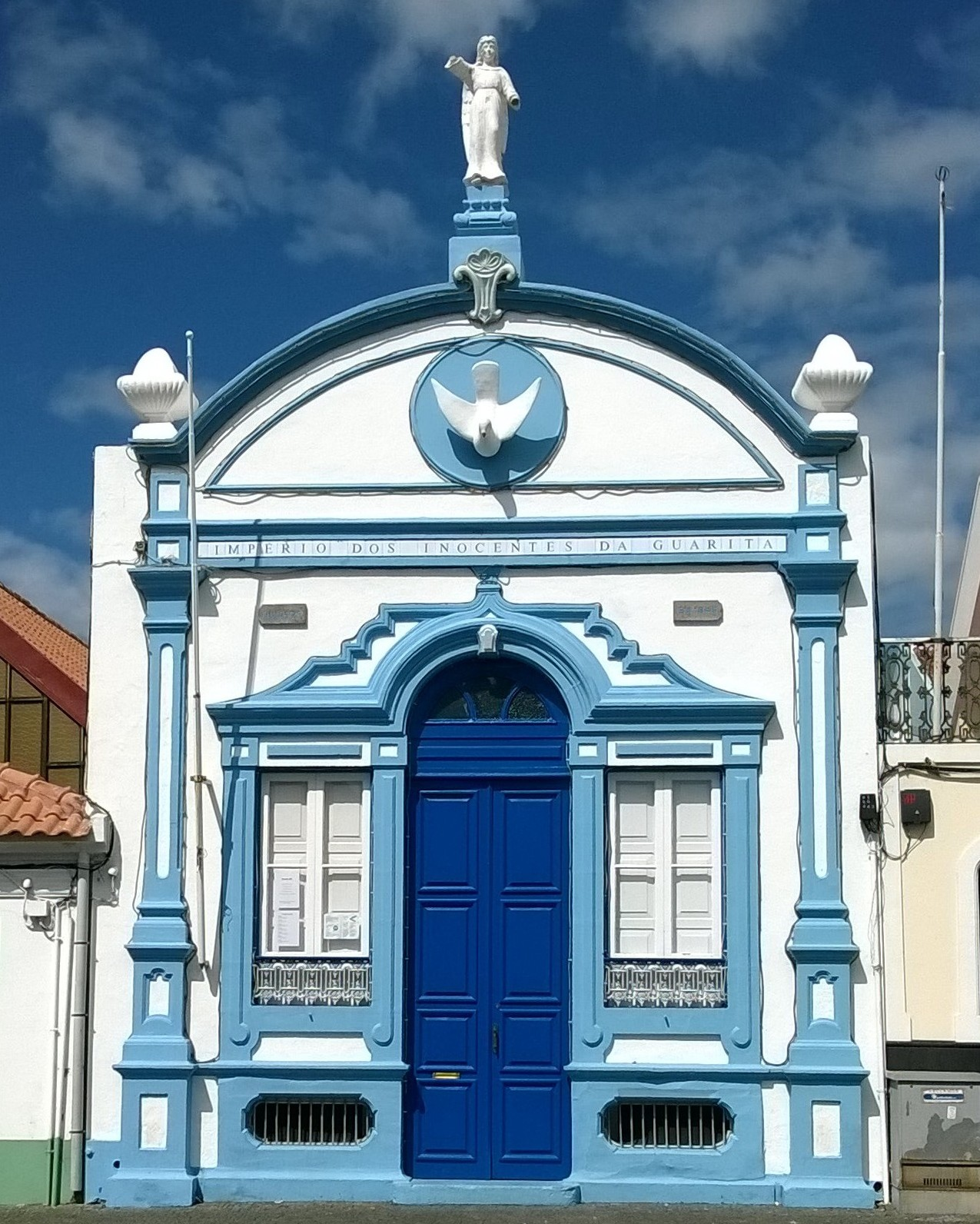
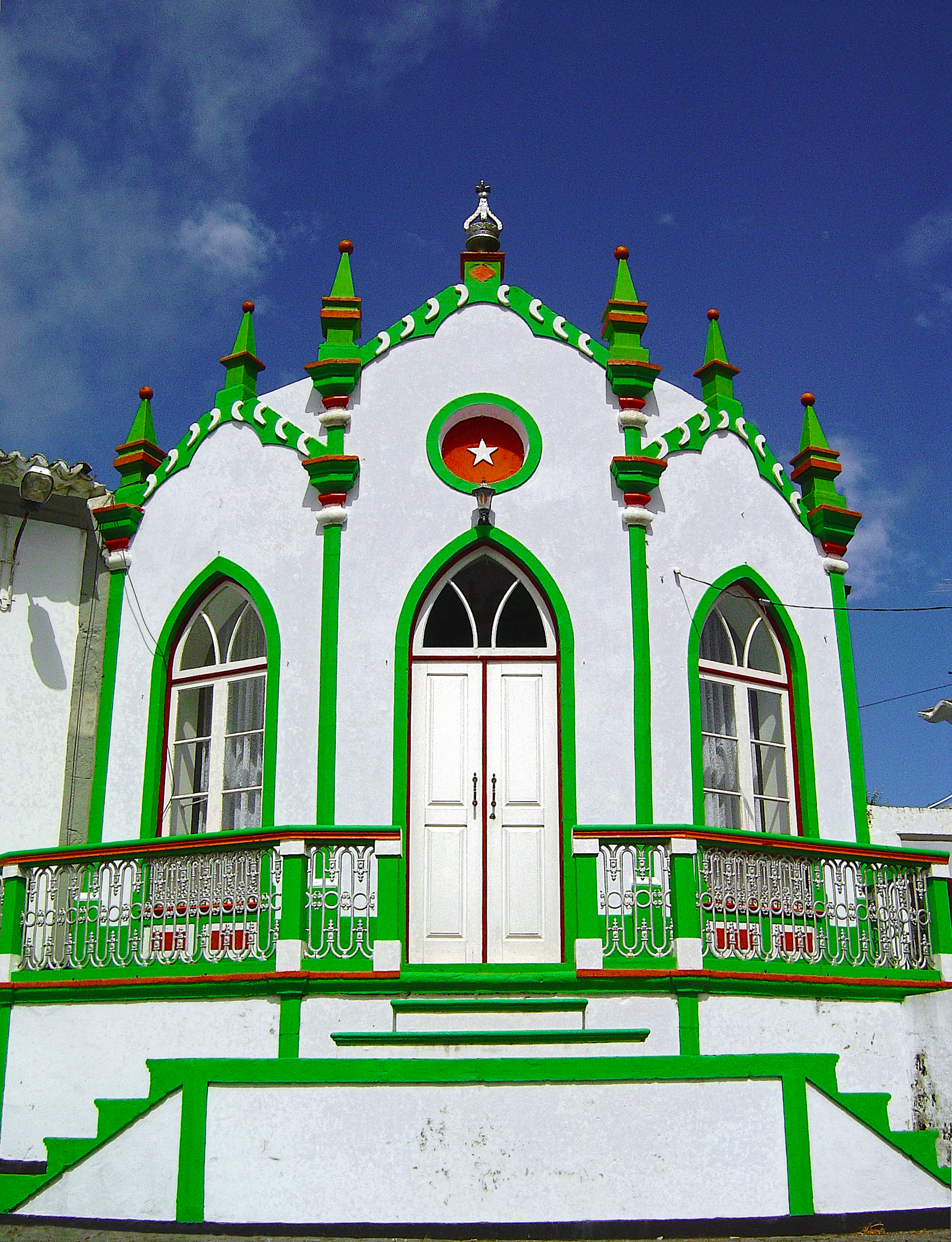
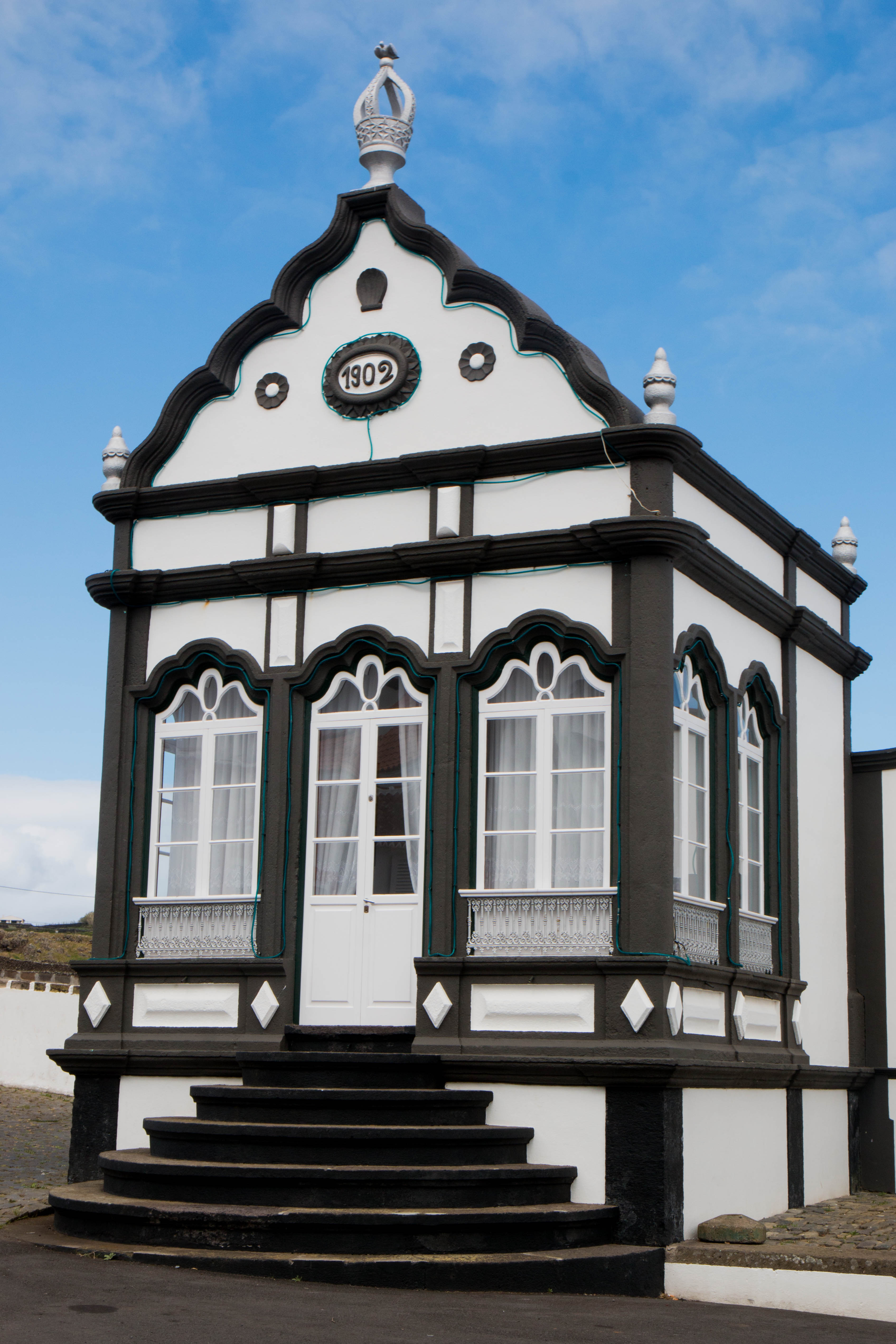
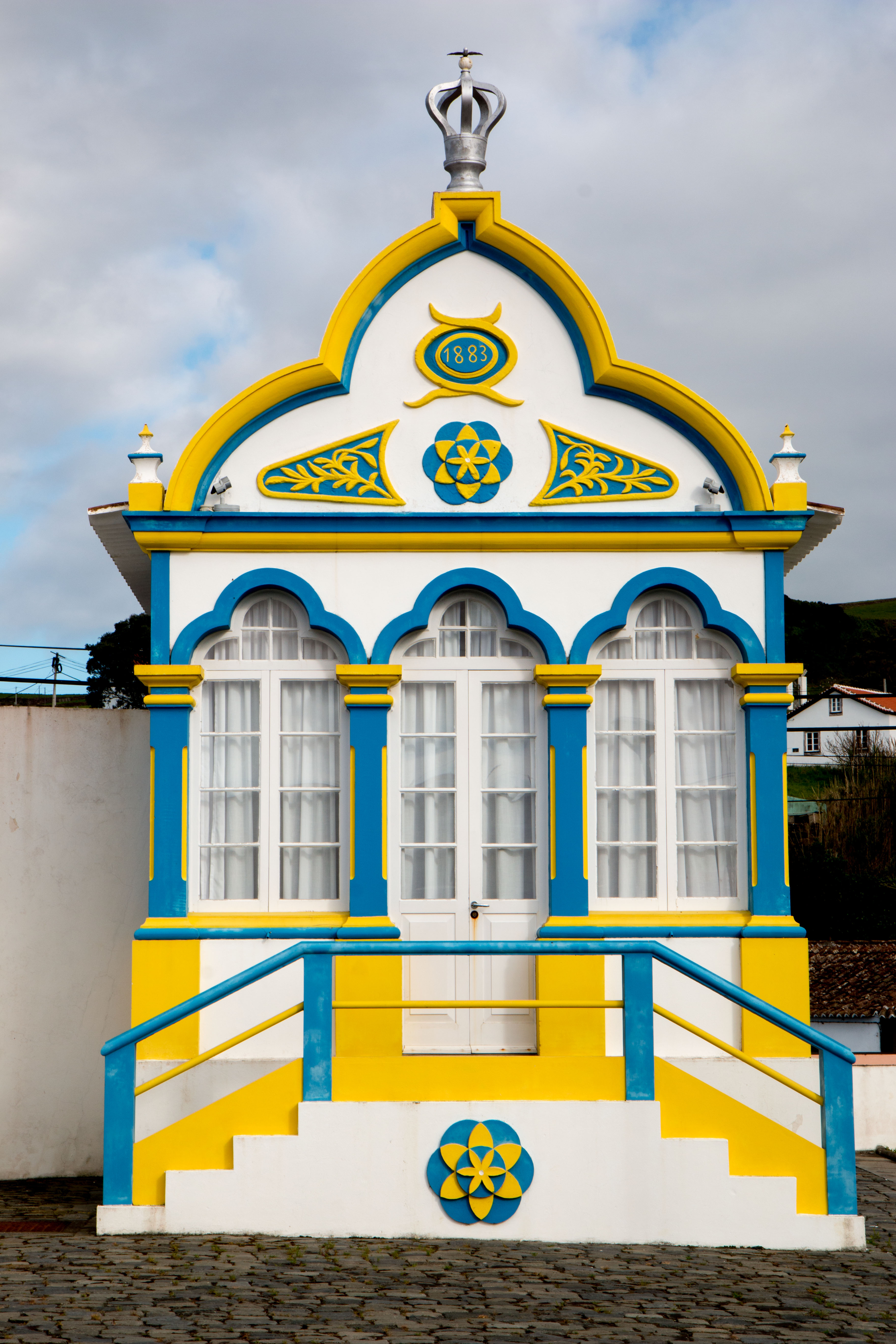
Impérios of the Cult of the Holy Spirit are found throughout the Azores.

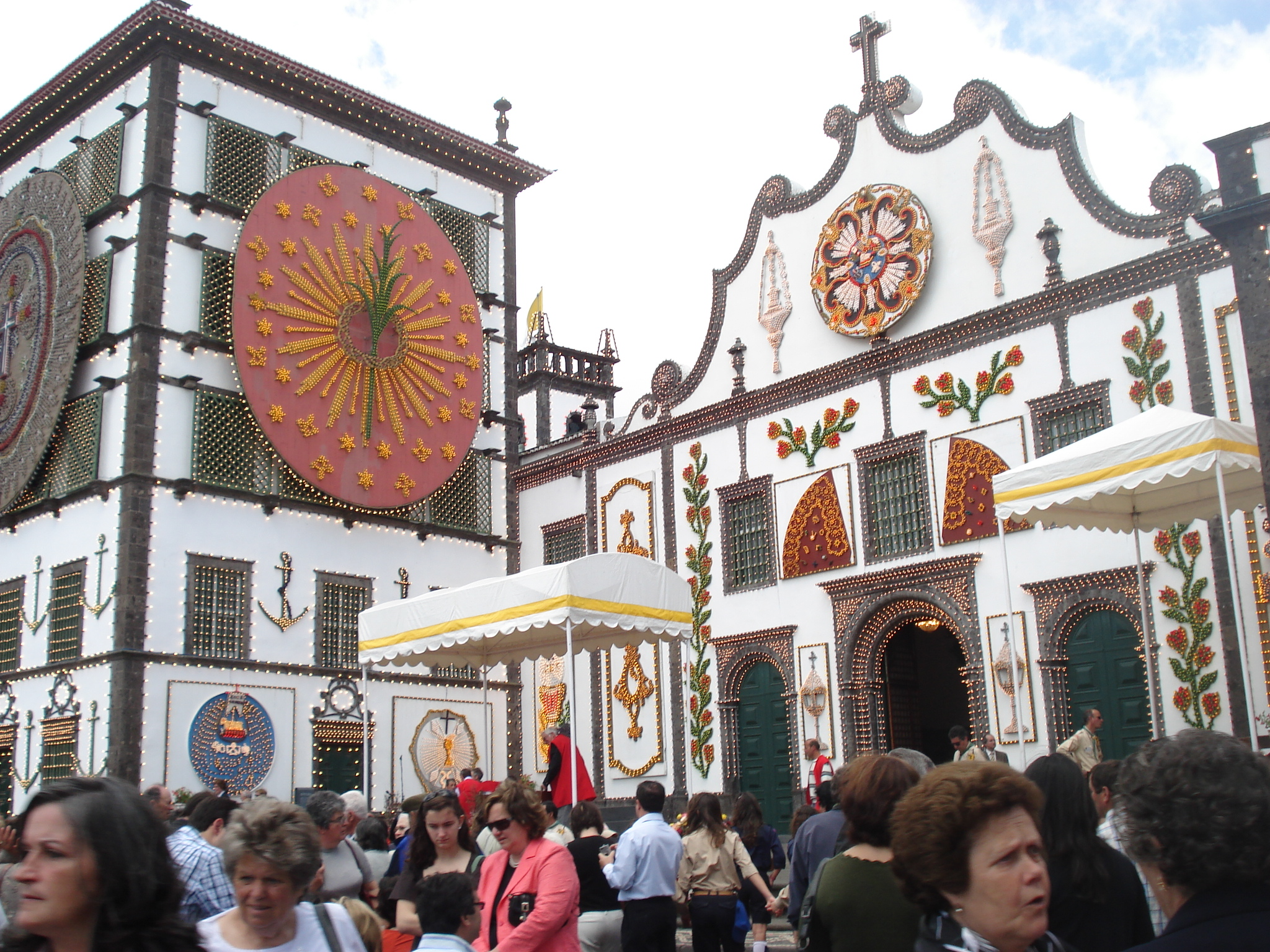
Procession of the Cult of the Holy Lord Christ of the Miracles

The Festival of Lord Holy Christ of the Miracles (Senhor Santo Cristo dos Milagres) in Ponta Delgada is the largest individual religious event in the Azores and takes place on Rogation Sunday. Pilgrims from within the Portuguese diaspora normally travel to Ponta Delgada to participate in an afternoon procession behind the image of Christ along the flower-decorated streets of the city. Although the solemn procession is only held on one day, the events of the Festival of Senhor Santo Cristo occur over a period of a week and involve a ritual of moving the image between the main church and convent nightly, ultimately culminating in the procession, which is televised within the Azores and to the Portuguese diaspora.

The Sanjoaninas Festivities in Angra do Heroísmo are held in June honoring Saint Anthony, Saint Peter and Saint John the Baptist, in a large religious celebration. The festival of Our Lady of Lourdes (Nossa Senhora de Lourdes), patron saint of whalers, begins in Lajes on Pico Island on the last Sunday of August and runs through the week—Whalers Week. It is marked by social and cultural events connected to the tradition of whale hunting. The Wine Harvest Festival (Festa das Vindimas), takes place during the first week of September and is a century-old custom of the people of Pico.

On Corvo, the people celebrate their patron saint Nossa Senhora dos Milagres (Our Lady of Miracles) on 15 August every year in addition to the festivals of the Divine Holy Spirit. The Festival da Maré de Agosto (August Sea Festival), takes place every year beginning on 15 August in Praia Formosa on Santa Maria. Also, the Semana do Mar (Sea Week), dedicated almost exclusively to water sports, takes place in August in Horta. Carnaval is celebrated in the Azores. Parades and pageants are the heart of the Carnaval festivities. There is lively music, colorful costumes, hand-made masks, and floats. The traditional bullfights in the bullring are ongoing as is the running of bulls in the streets.

=== International visitors ===
During the 18th and 19th centuries, Graciosa was host to many prominent figures, including

- Chateaubriand, the French writer who passed through upon his escape to America during the French Revolution
- Almeida Garrett, the Portuguese poet who visited an uncle and wrote some poetry while there
- Prince Albert of Monaco, the 19th century oceanographer who led several expeditions in the waters of the Azores. He arrived on his yacht Hirondelle, and visited the furna da caldeira, the noted hot springs grotto.
- author Mark Twain published The Innocents Abroad in 1869 – a travel book, where he described his time in the Azores.

=== Sport ===
Notable sports teams include Santa Clara (Primeira Liga), Lusitânia (Liga Portuguesa de Basquetebol), Fonte do Bastardo (Portuguese Volleyball First Division) and Sporting Clube da Horta (Portuguese Handball Second Division). The Rallye Açores is an international rally race held annually since 1965, which was part of the European Rally Championship and the Intercontinental Rally Challenge. The Azores Senior Open was a golf tournament held in 2008 as part of the European Seniors Tour.

== See also ==
- Postage stamps and postal history of the Azores
- List of islands of Portugal
