= Prainha (São Roque do Pico) =

- Civil parish
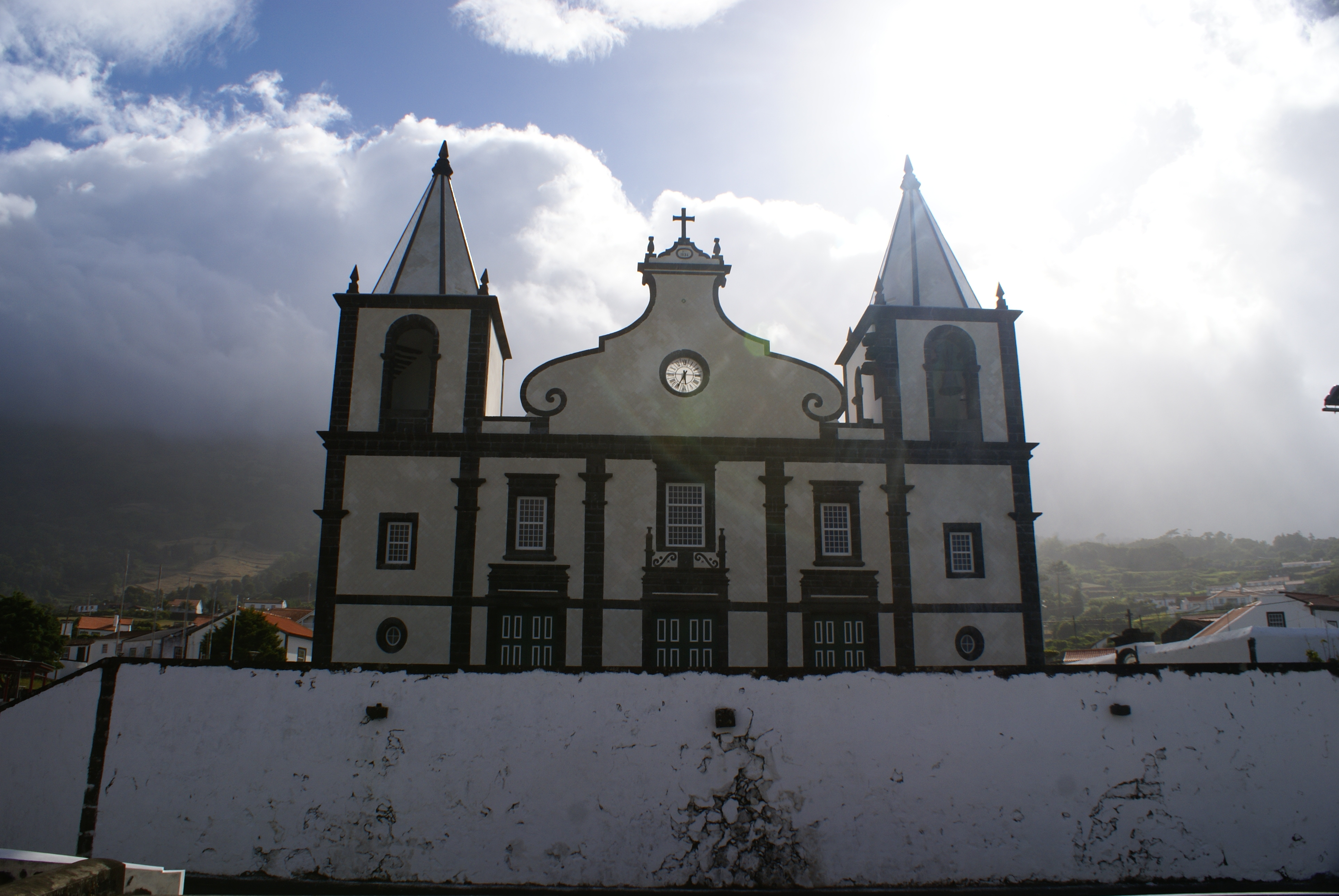
- Front façade of the Church of Nossa Senhora da Ajuda, Prainha de Baixo

- Location of Prainha within the municipality of São Roque do Pico, Pico Island
- Coordinates: 38°28′56″N 28°14′8″W
- Country: Portugal
- Auton. region: Azores
- Island: Pico
- Municipality: São Roque do Pico

Area
  - Total: 26.10 km^{2} (10.08 sq mi)
- Highest elevation: 881 m (2,890 ft)
- Lowest elevation: 0 m (0 ft)

Population (2021)
  - Total: 530
  - Density: 20/km^{2} (53/sq mi)
- Time zone: UTC−01:00 (AZOT)
  - Summer (DST): UTC+00:00 (AZOST)
- Postal code: 9940-040
- Area code: 292
- Patron: Nossa Senhora Da Ajuda

Prainha is a civil parish in the municipality of São Roque do Pico on the island of Pico, in the Portuguese archipelago of the Azores. It has 530 inhabitants in an area of 26.10 km^{2}.

== History ==
“Prainha” was the second settlement to be formed on the north coast of Pico Island, whose settlement began with natives from Northern Portugal, after stopping at Terceira and Graciosa. According to Gaspar Frutuoso, in Saudades da Terra, this village already existed in 1522, as well as its parish church. The oldest known record of this temple dates from 1599, although the administrative and ecclesiastical institution of Prainha came much earlier. In 1572, an enormous volcanic eruption took place on a peak near the Caiado Lake, next to the parish. The extraordinary torrent of lava reached the sea and formed a great “mistério” (Azorean expression to designate a terrain of spongy lava, covered with moss and herbs), known as Prainha (Portuguese for "little beach"). This mistério located between this parish and São Roque is classified as a nature reserve.

For centuries, there were no other means of communication between the various islands of the archipelago, except by sea, until in 1858, the first telephone connection was made between Lisbon and Ponta Delgada, which also helped to connect other islands. The first connections on Pico were made in the parish of Prainha, specifically on the place of Canto da Areia, which was connected to São Jorge by a cable. The small house which served as a terminal for the submarine cable is still known today as Casa do Fio (House of the Wire), and was used as a shelter for a military detachment during World War I.

== Geography ==
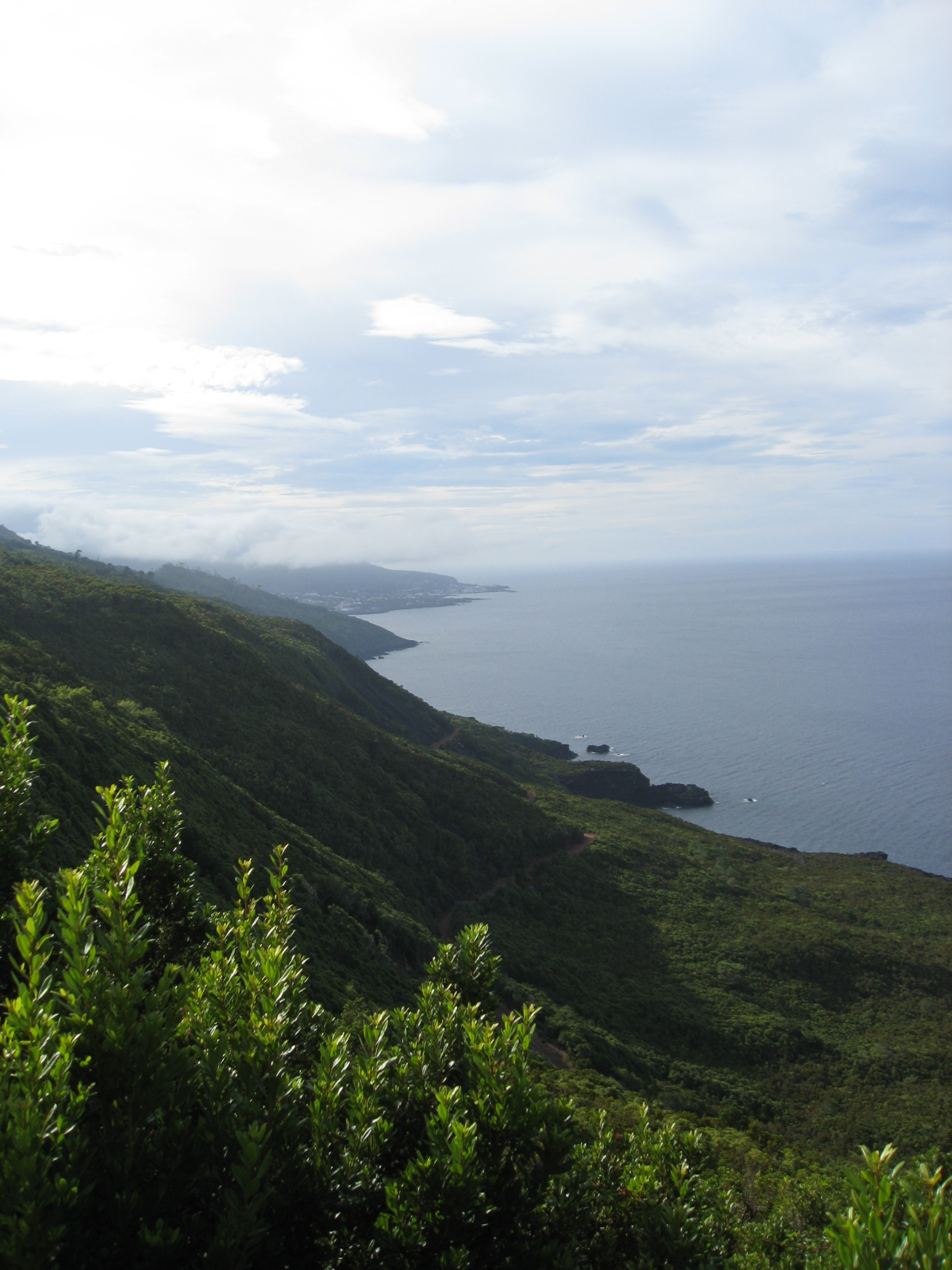
Recreational Forest Reserve of Prainha

Prainha is located on the northern coast of the municipality of São Roque do Pico, buttressed by the parishes of Santo Amaro in the east, São Roque to the west, Lajes and Ribeiras to the south and the Atlantic Ocean to the north. It has an almost perfect rectangular shape, with 26.1 km^{2} (10.1 sq mi), which corresponds to 18.3% of the municipality's total area, and is approximately 11.2 km (7.0 mi) from its seat.

The parish has very rough topography with slopes oriented NW-SE which connect the low, coastal plain lands with the high, inland Achada Plateau reaching 881 m (2,890 ft) on Cabeço do Mistério. The territory is part of the Volcanic Complex of São Roque-Piedade. The Mistério da Prainha, a formation made up of lava flows emitted by a historic eruption above the parish (1562-1564), occupies the extreme west of it. This latter area, extends from the coast to the interior, and is characterized by its high fajã and massive lava delta along the northern coast (equally divided between Prainha and São Roque). This zone also pertains to the Recreational Forest Reserve of Prainha.

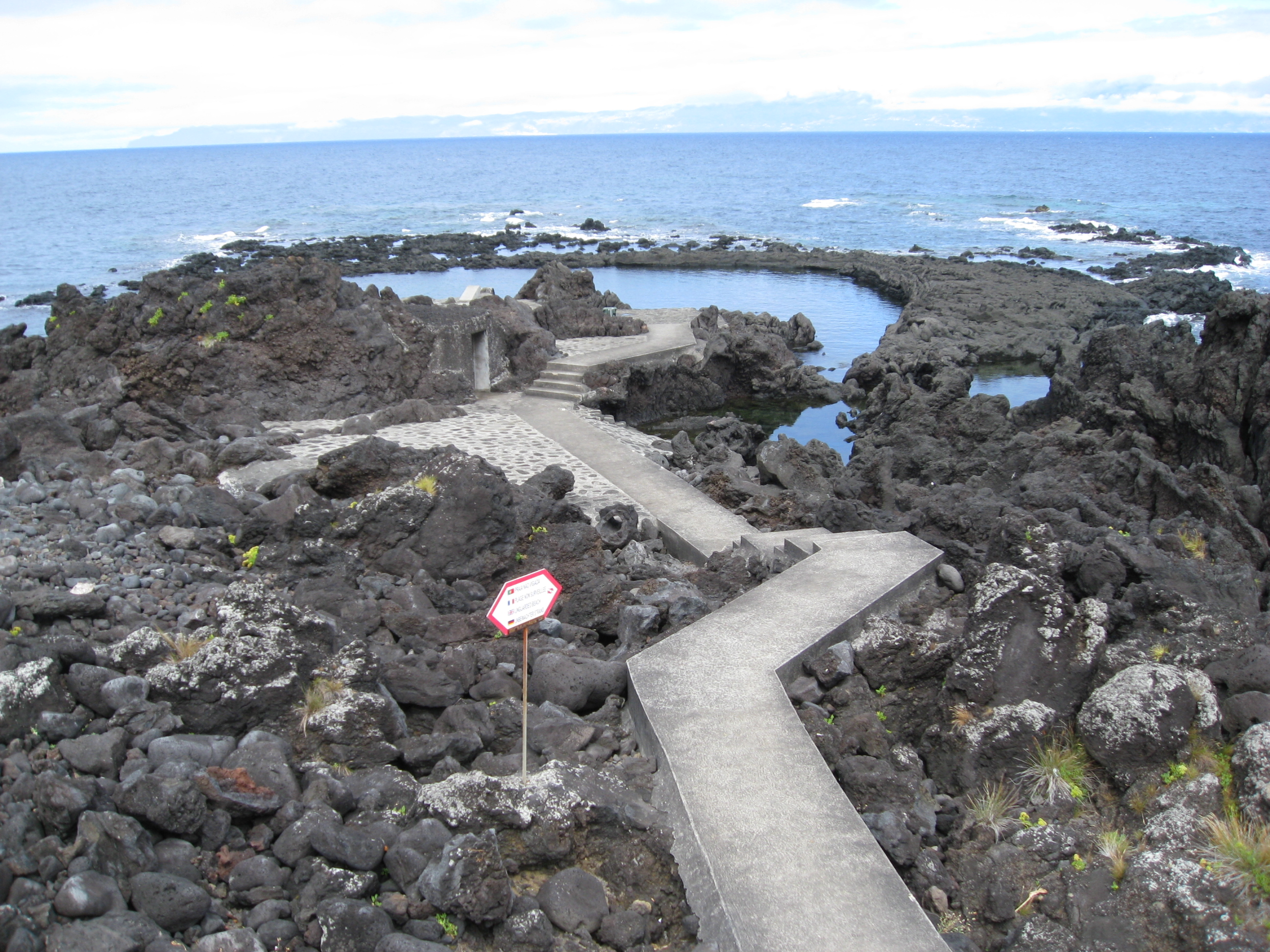
Poça Branca, a natural swimming pool

The coastline, with about 9.2 km (5.7 mi), is generally low and very jagged, with islets and points that alternate with sheltered coves, especially the Areia Bay (Baía da Areia) and the Canas Bay (Baía de Canas). The small port and above all the “natural pools” attract many holidaymakers, especially Poça Branca, where there are excellent conditions for bathing. The beach of Canto da Areia, with black volcanic sands, is the only beach on Pico Island. The small watercourses, with shallow valleys, originate in the Achada Plateau and flow in a torrential regime. South of the parish, numerous lagoons (Lagoa do Caiado, Lagoa Seca) are home to various bird and plant species and have a significant environmental interest.

=== Climate ===
Prainha has a humid subtropical climate, with some Mediterranean influences. The parish is located on an extremely precipitous area on the island of Pico and the Azores. Areas close to the coast receive on average around 2,000 mm (79 in) of precipitation per year, making it among the rainiest coastal areas on the middle latitudes. At higher altitudes, precipitation is even higher, with the Lagoa do Caiado receiving over 4,000 mm (160 in) per year. Temperatures experienced in the winter (January through March) hover between 16–17 °C (61–63 °F) at daytime and 11–12 °C (52–54 °F) at night and in the summer (July through September) temperatures vary from 25–26 °C (77–79 °F) during the day and 20–21 °C (68–70 °F) during the night. Humidity is around 80% year-round.

=== Human geography ===
In terms of human occupation, the pattern of settlement is linear, extending along the regional road. The main agglomerates are the places of Prainha de Cima, Prainha de Baixo and Canto da Areia. The secondary streets, which run perpendicular to the coastline, accommodate some scattered houses.

In the last century, the population evolved in a similar way to the other parishes of the archipelago, registering a decrease in the period from 1900 to 1930, a slight increase until 1960 and again a gradual decrease until today.

== Economy ==
Farming, viticulture and fishing are the economic base of the parish, along with livestock, carpentry, sawmilling, baking, dairy products, small businesses and basalt cutting. More recently, tourism has also played a role in the local economy, several typical houses made of volcanic stone, characteristic of the island have been the focus of restoration works.
