= The Magnificent =

The Magnificent may refer to:

- "The Magnificent" (song), a 1995 song by the One World Orchestra
- The Magnificent (DJ Jazzy Jeff album), 2002
- The Magnificent (Keith Sweat album), 2009
- The Magnificent (Beenie Man album)
- List of people known as the Magnificent

== See also ==
- Magnificent (disambiguation)
- The Magnificents (disambiguation)
- Magnificence (disambiguation)
