= Mistério (Azores) =

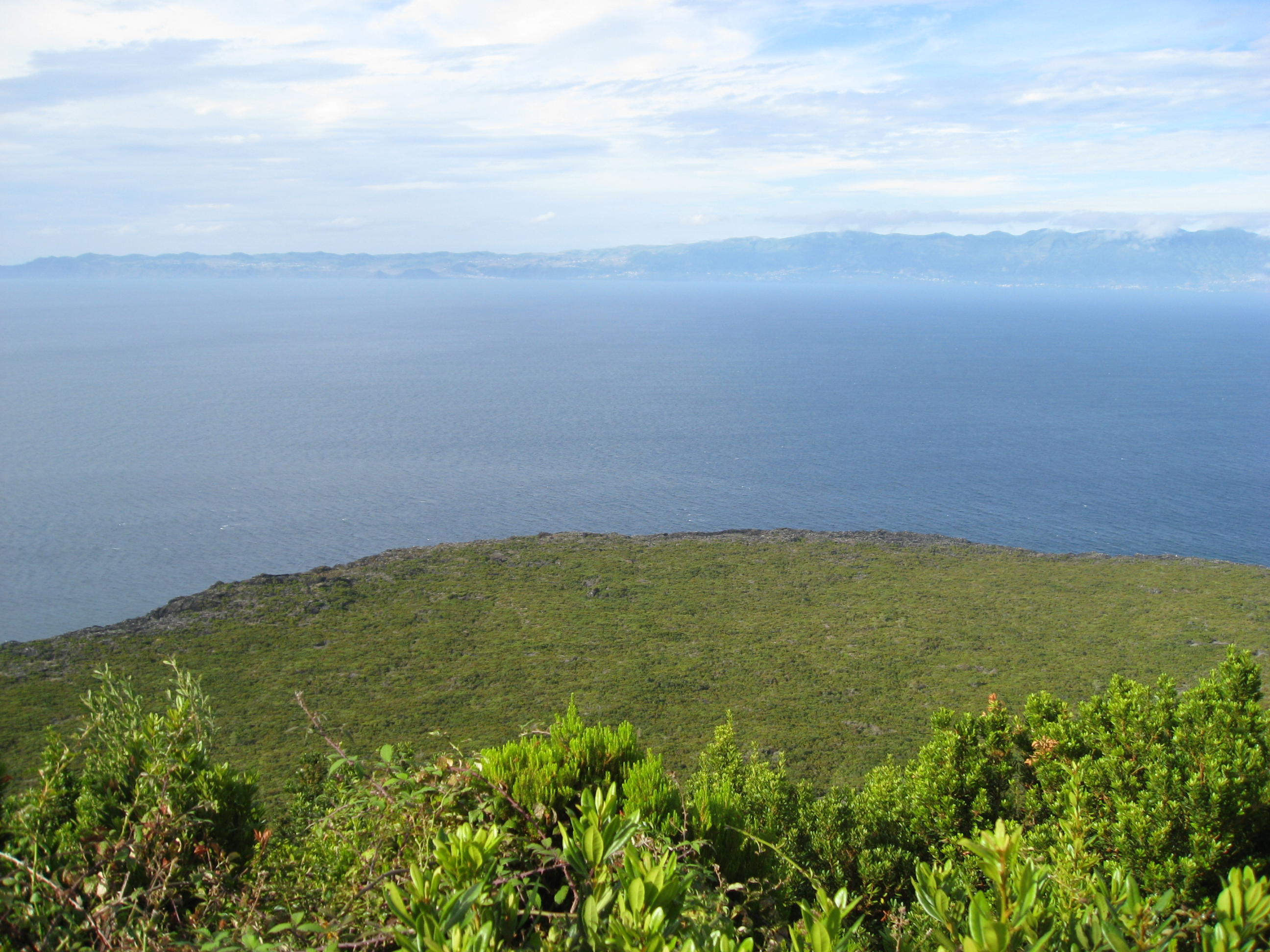
Mistério da Prainha, Pico Island, showing a lava field

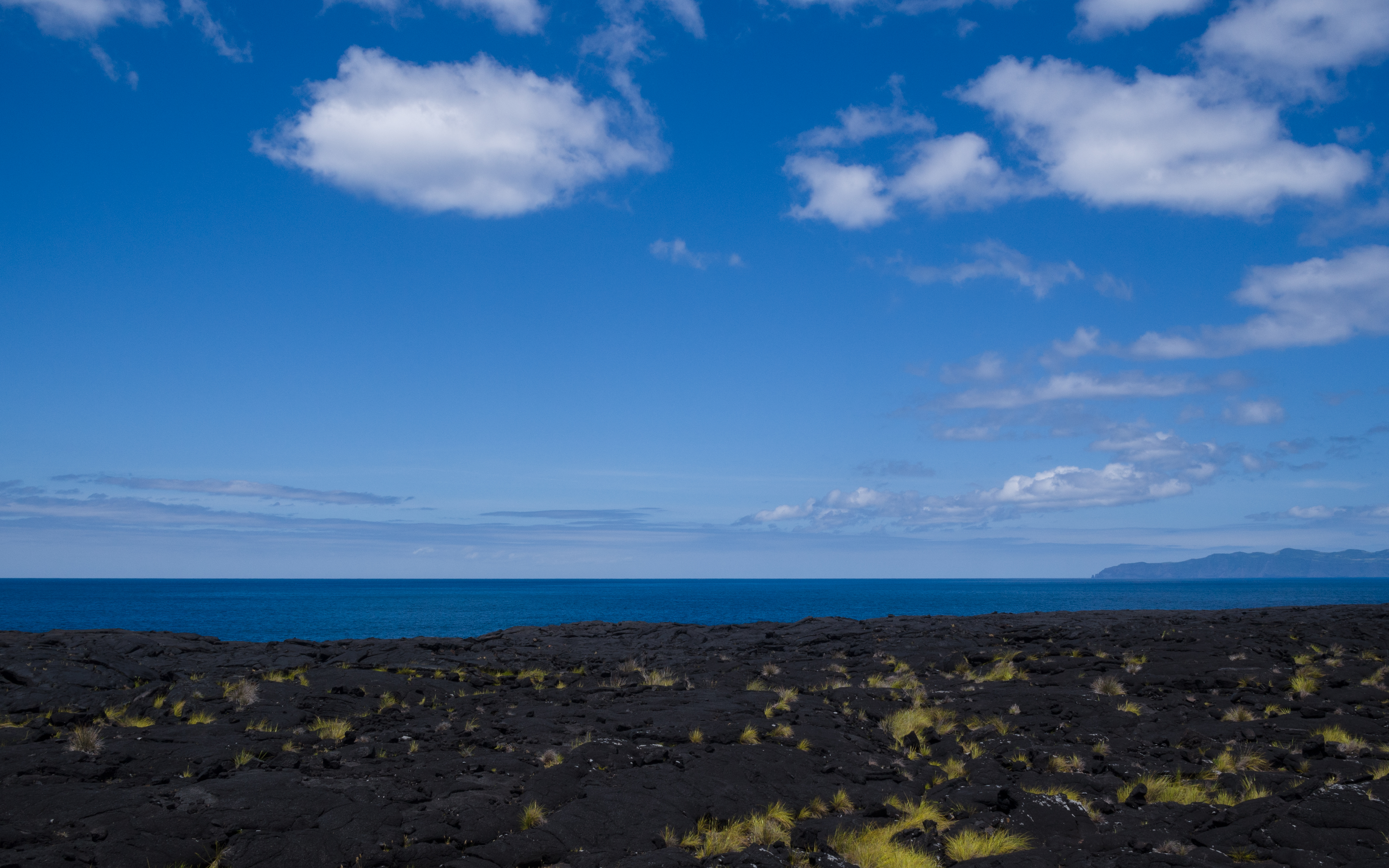
Typical landscape of a mistério

A mistério (Portuguese: [miʃˈtɛɾju]) is a term used in the Portuguese archipelago of the Azores to designate a volcanic eruption or a product of such which occurred after human occupation of the area. This term is applied particularly to the Central Group, where some volcanic activity postdates the first settlements. These habitats have little to no vegetation, depending on the time of the eruption, though some might be arable.

The word mistério is translated into the word mystery. The origin of the name dates back to at least the 16th century. The early inhabitants of the islands, mostly from continental Portugal, an area with no volcanic activity, who reportedly saw "rivers of fire" (lava flows) destroying their belongings were unfamiliar with such events and thus gave the resulting structures the current name.

Some Mistérios include the Mistérios da Prainha, Mistério de São João e Santa Luzia (1718) and Mistério da Silveira (1720) on Pico, Mistério do Cabeço do Fogo (1672) on Faial and the Mistérios Negros on Terceira.

== See also ==
- Fajã
