= Magnificent =

Magnificent may refer to:

- HMS Magnificent, Royal Navy ships
- HMCS Magnificent (CVL 21), a Canadian ship
- Magnificent!, a 1969 album by jazz pianist Barry Harris
- "Magnificent" (Rick Ross song), 2009
- "Magnificent" (U2 song), 2009
- "Magnificent", a song by Moka Only and Ishkan from Lowdown Suite, 2003
- "Magnificent", a song by Estelle from Shine, 2008

== See also ==
- The Magnificents (disambiguation)
- List of people known as the Magnificent
- The Magnificent (disambiguation)
- Magnificence (disambiguation)
