= The Magnificents =

The Magnificents may refer to:

- Johnny Keyes and the Magnificents, a 1950s doo-wop vocal group
- The Magnificents (Scottish band), a Scottish electro rock band
  - The Magnificents (album), their debut album

== See also ==
- Magnificent (disambiguation)
- The Magnificent (disambiguation)
- Magnificence (disambiguation)
