= George C. Chesbro =

American author

George C. Chesbro c.1985

George C. Chesbro (June 4, 1940 – November 18, 2008) was an American author of detective fiction. His most notable works feature '"Dr. Robert "Mongo the Magnificent" Fredrickson"'. He also wrote the novelisation of the movie The Golden Child starring Eddie Murphy.

Chesbro was born in Washington, D.C. He worked as a special education teacher at Pearl River and later at Rockland Psychiatric Center, where he worked with troubled teens. Chesbro was married and had a son, a daughter and two stepdaughters.

== Bibliography ==
=== The Mongo Series ===
- Shadow of a Broken Man 1977 (ISBN 0-671-22696-7)
- City of Whispering Stone 1978 (ISBN 0-9674503-1-4)
- An Affair of Sorcerers 1979 (ISBN 0-671-24625-9)
- The Beasts of Valhalla 1985 (ISBN 0-689-11516-4)
- Two Songs This Archangel Sings 1987 (ISBN 0-689-11659-4)
- The Cold Smell of Sacred Stone 1988 (ISBN 0-689-11913-5)
- Second Horseman Out of Eden 1989 (ISBN 0-689-11979-8)
- The Language of Cannibals 1990 (ISBN 0-892-96394-8)
- In the House of Secret Enemies 1990 (ISBN 0-892-96395-6)
- The Fear in Yesterday's Rings 1991 (ISBN 0-892-96396-4)
- Dark Chant in a Crimson Key 1992 (ISBN 0-892-96463-4)
- An Incident at Bloodtide 1993 (ISBN 0-892-96464-2)
- Bleeding in the Eye of a Brainstorm 1995 (ISBN 1-930253-13-3)
- Dream of a Falling Eagle 1996 (ISBN 1-930253-14-1)
- Lord of Ice and Loneliness 2003 (ISBN 978-2-7436-1532-1) French translation, not published in the US.

=== The Chant series ===
- Chant 1986
- Chant: Silent Killer 1987
- Chant: Code of Blood 1987

=== The Veil Series ===
- Veil 1986
- Jungle of Steel and Stone 1988

=== Other Novels ===
- Bone - Mysterious Press, 1989
- The Golden Child - Pocket, 1986
- Turn Loose The Dragons - Ballantine, 1982
- Crying Freeman - Rivages, 1999 (French translation, novelisation of French film)
- King's Gambit - New English Library, 1976
- The Keeper - Apache Books Publications, 2001
- Prism: A Memoir As Fiction - Apache Books Publications, 2001

=== Short-Story Collections ===
- Strange Prey - Apache Beach Publications, 2004
- Lone Wolves - Apache Beach Publications, 2003
