= Manuel de Noronha =

Portuguese prelate (1483/1500–1564)

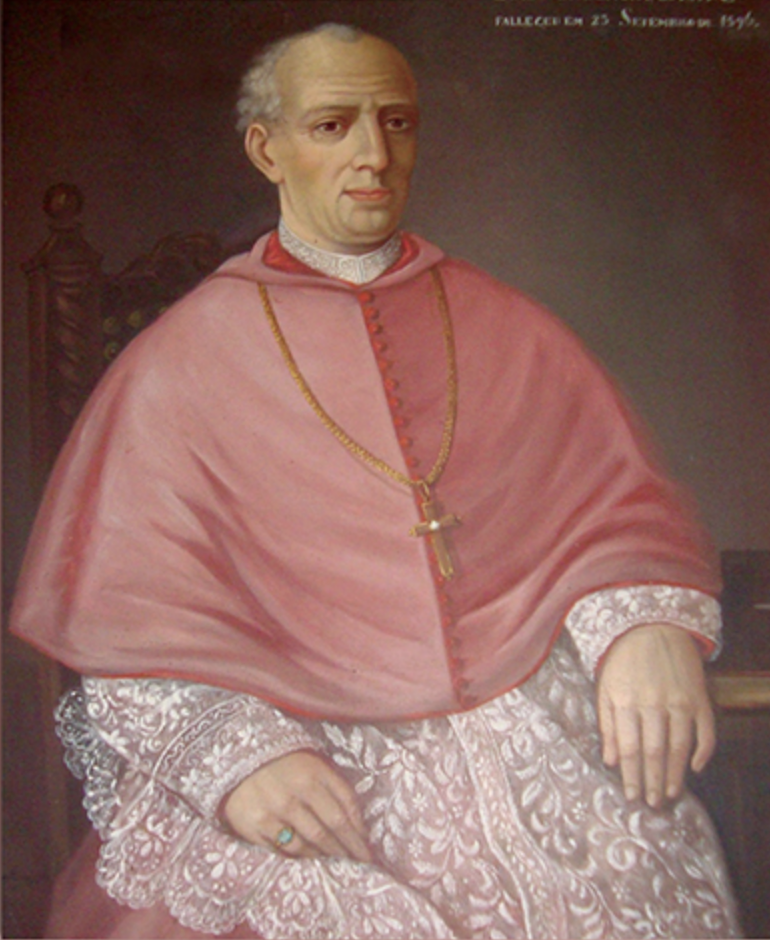
- Posthumous depiction of de Noronha, 1596

Bishop of Lamego
- In office April 22, 1551 – November 3, 1564
- Appointed by: Pope Julius III
- Preceded by: Agostinho Ribeiro
- Succeeded by: Manuel de Menezes

Personal details
- Born: c. 1490; Funchal, Madeira, Portugal
- Died: November 3, 1564 (aged 73–74); Lamego, Beira Alta, Portugal
- Parent: Simão Gonçalves da Câmara

Manuel de Noronha (c. 1490 – November 3, 1564) was a Portuguese prelate who served as the Bishop of Lamego from 1551 until his death in 1564. While in the position, he was known for his social reforms within the diocese, including his efforts to alleviate poverty and better the infrastructure.

== Background ==
Manuel de Noronha was born late in the 15th century, in Funchal, Madeira, Portugal. He was the son of Simão Gonçalves da Câmara, the third donatary captain of Funchal, and Joana Valente. His family was closely tied to the noble and colonial leadership of the island, as his great-grandfather was the discoverer João Gonçalves Zarco.

Aside from his general background, little is known of Manuel de Noronha's early life.

== Rise within the Catholic Church ==
Sometime in the 1510s, de Noronha was said to have been sent on a mission to Rome on behalf of the Portuguese monarch, where he received his prelatial investiture, gaining favor in the Vatican. His talents and virtues were recognized during the reign of Pope Leo X; however, the exact details of his role in the Vatican remain unclear. Some sources suggest that he served as a papal nuncio, which is a highly responsible diplomatic position, though the specifics of where and how he served remain unknown.

== Bishop of Lamego ==
In 1547, following his service in Rome, de Noronha returned to Portugal and was appointed Bishop of Lamego on April 22, 1551. His appointment would have required confirmation by Pope Julius III, making him the formal appointer of Noronha; Lamego was considered one of the most important dioceses in the Kingdom of Portugal at that time.

As bishop, de Noronha is remembered as one of the most distinguished prelates of the Diocese of Lamego. He undertook significant works in the diocese, such as the construction of various churches and the notable chapel of St. Nicholas in the cathedral cloister. He also endowed the chapel with revenues to sustain daily worship and a college for young men aspiring to the priesthood. In addition, he is credited with improving the city's infrastructure, including the introduction of a clean water supply. Aware of the social needs of his time, where there was a strong concern for female poverty, de Noronha believed that no girl should be left without support. He made sure that all were married to good and wealthy men, regardless of their social status.

De Noronha was deeply committed to ecclesiastical reform, addressing matters of church discipline, and convening a diocesan council to address the needs of the local clergy and faithful.

== Personal life ==
He died on November 3, 1564, and was buried in the chapel of St. Nicholas, which he had founded.
