= Magnificence =

Magnificence may refer to:

- Magnificence (history of ideas)
- Magnificence, one of Catherine de' Medici's court festivals in 16th-century France
- Magnificence (play), 1973 play by Howard Brenton

== See also ==
- Magnificent (disambiguation)
- The Magnificent (disambiguation)
- The Magnificents (disambiguation)
