= List of people known as the Magnificent =

The Magnificent is an epithet applied to:

== People ==
- Amenhotep III (died 1531 or 1533 BC), Pharaoh of Egypt
- Edmund I (922–946), King of England
- Isma'il Pasha (1830–1895), Khedive of Egypt and Sudan
- Joasaph II of Constantinople, Ecumenical Patriarch of Constantinople from 1556 to 1565
- Leo I, King of Armenia (1150–1219), also known as Levon I the Magnificent
- Lorenzo de' Medici (1449–1492), Italian statesman and de facto ruler of the Florentine Republic
- Robert I, Duke of Normandy (1000–1035), father of William the Conqueror
- Shah Jahan (1592 –1666), Emperor of Mughal Empire
- Simão Gonçalves da Câmara (1463–1530), Portuguese governor of the captaincy of Funchal
- Suleiman the Magnificent (1494–1566), Sultan of the Ottoman Empire

== Fictional and legendary characters ==
- Carnac the Magnificent, a recurring character played by late-night television host Johnny Carson
- Gudrød the Hunter, a petty king in Norwegian sagas
- Mongo the Magnificent, a private eye and criminologist in several books by George C. Chesbro
- Morgus the Magnificent, a "horror host" of late-night science fiction and horror movies
- Peter Pevensie, in the Chronicles of Narnia fantasy series
- Sabran Berethnet, in the fantasy novel The Priory of the Orange Tree by Samantha Shannon

== See also ==
- Pierre Bernard (yogi) (1875–1955), "Oom the Magnificent", American yogi, scholar, occultist, philosopher, mystic and businessman
- Mario Lemieux (born 1965), "The Magnificent One", "Le Magnifique", professional ice hockey player
- List of people known as the Great
