= Pico Island =

Portuguese island in Azores archipelago

Native name: Ilha do Pico Nickname: The Black Island
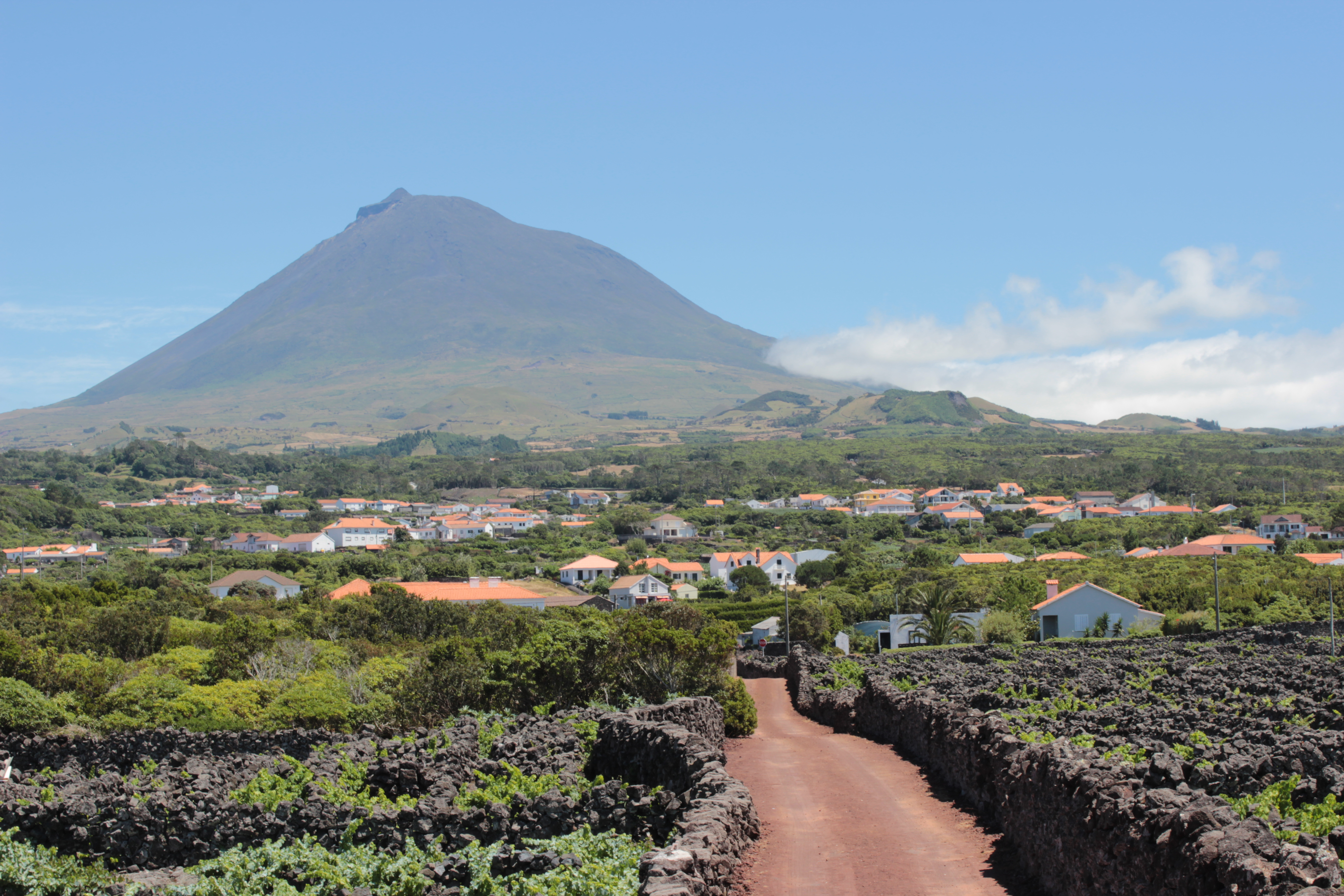
- The island of Pico, as seen from the north-west coast in the outskirts of Madalena with vineyards and Mount Pico in the background

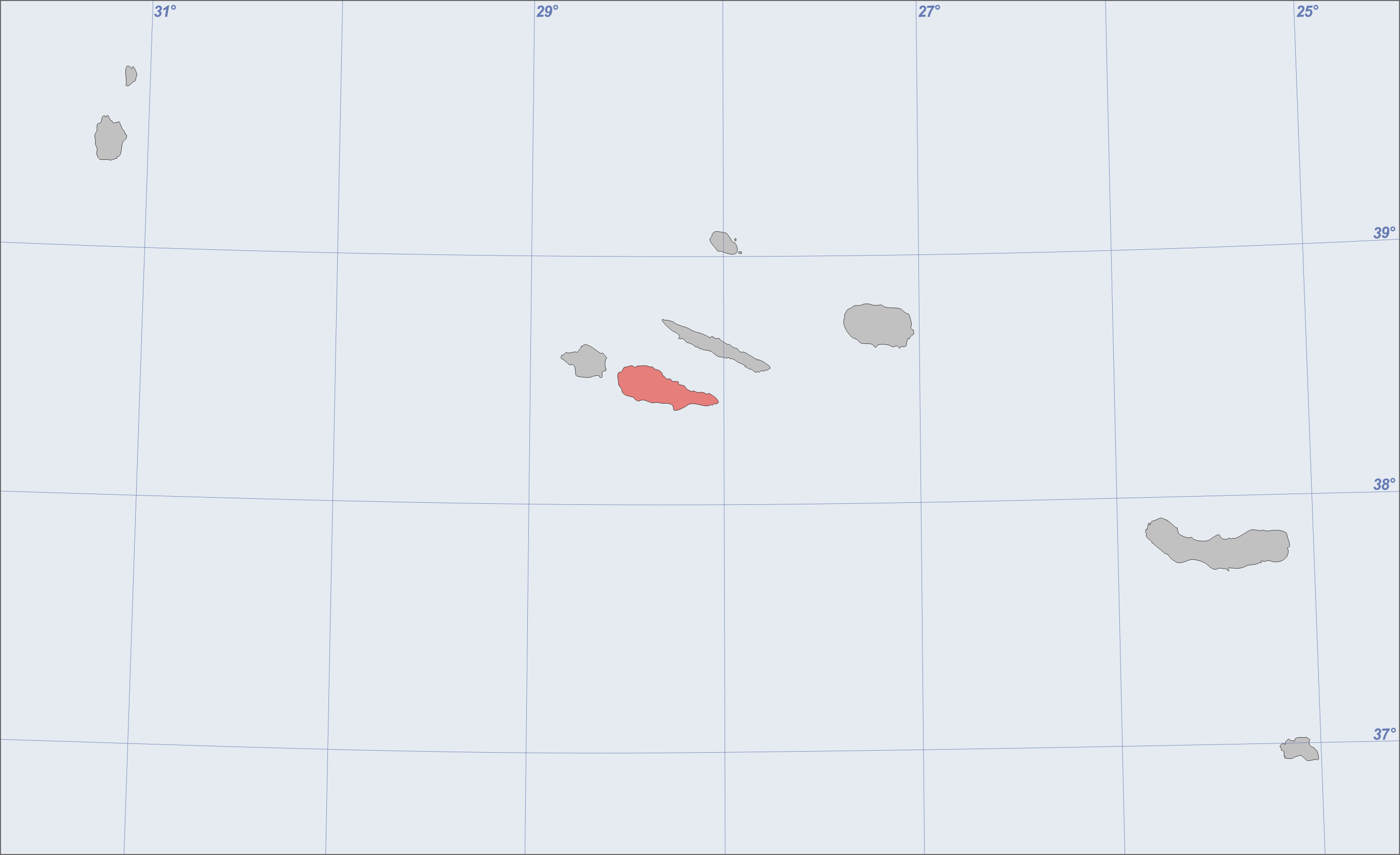
- Location of the island of Pico in the archipelago of the Azores
- Etymology: Portuguese for peak

Geography
- Location: Atlantic Ocean
- Coordinates: 38°27′57″N 28°20′0″W
- Archipelago: Azores
- Area: 444.97 km^{2} (171.80 sq mi)
- Area rank: 3rd largest island in Portugal
- Coastline: 151.84 km (94.349 mi)
- Highest elevation: 2,351 m (7713 ft)
- Highest point: Mount Pico

Administration
- Portugal
- Autonomous Region: Azores
- Municipalities: Lajes do Pico; Madalena; São Roque do Pico

Demographics
- Demonym: Picoense, Picaroto
- Population: ▼13,883 (2021)
- Pop. density: 31/km^{2} (80/sq mi)
- Languages: Portuguese
- Ethnic groups: Portuguese

Additional information
- Time zone: UTC−01:00

Pico Island (Ilha do Pico, Portuguese pronunciation: [ˈiʎɐ ðu ˈpiku]) is an island in the Central Group of the Portuguese Azores. The landscape features an eponymous volcano, Ponta do Pico, which is the highest mountain in Portugal, the Azores, and the highest elevation of the Mid-Atlantic Ridge. In the tradition of the Portuguese poet, Raul Brandão, Pico is referred to as the Ilha Preta ("Black Island"), for its black volcanic soils, which nourish its UNESCO-designated vineyards that once allowed the development of the island's economy. Pico is the second largest and, geologically speaking, the most recently formed island of the Azores, being around 300,000 years old.

== History ==
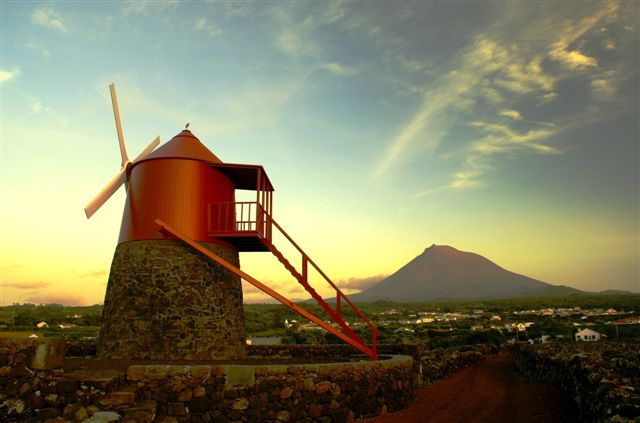
A traditional windmill along the coast of Monte, in the municipality of Madalena

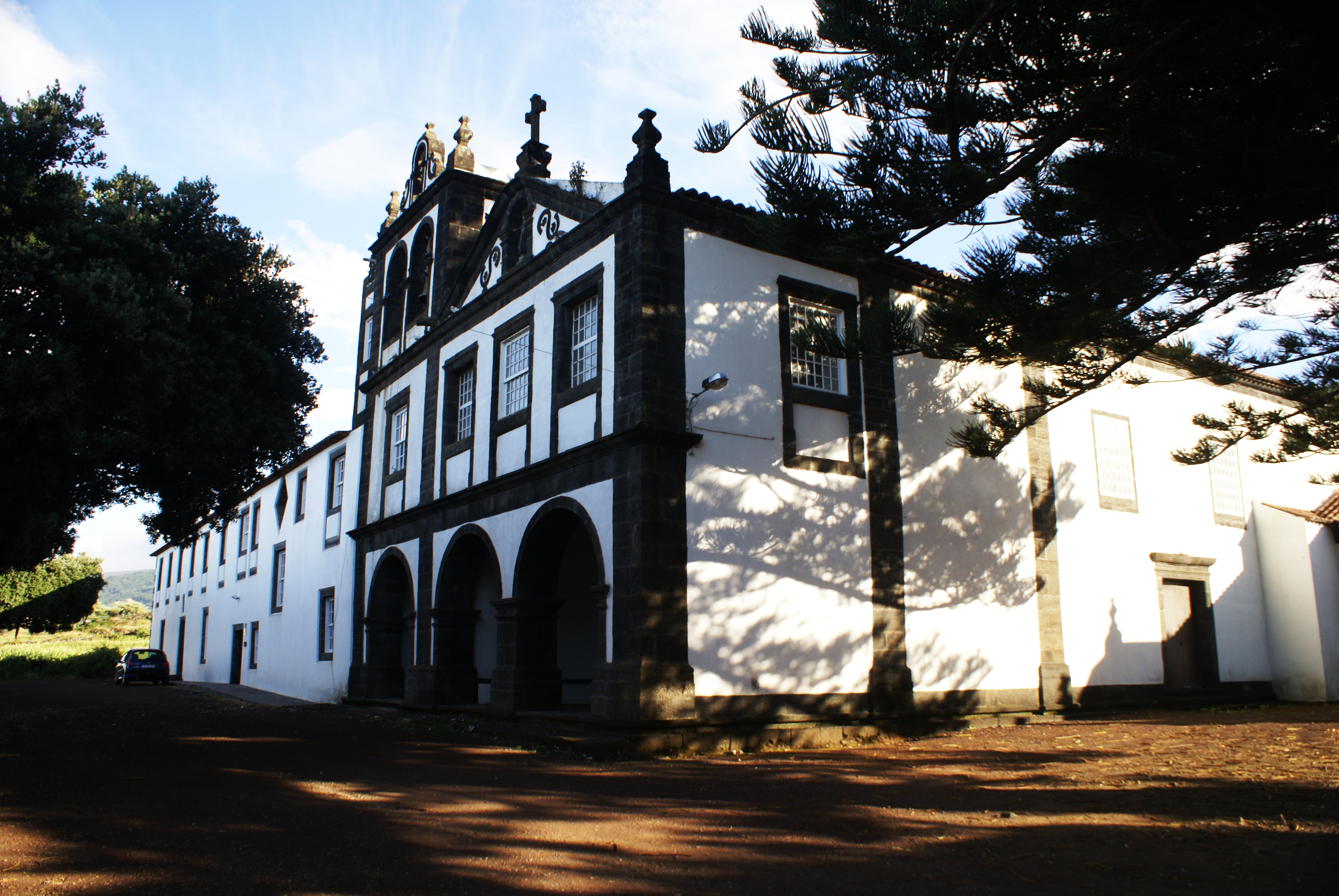
Convent of São Pedro de Alcântara, a 17th-century building

Radar image of Pico Island next to Faial and São Jorge islands

The exact date of the island's discovery is not known. However, in the 1375 Catalan Atlas, Pico is depicted along several other islands of the Azores, where it is labelled as li colunbj. In Cristoforo Soligo's map from 1475, Pico is described both as Dom Diniz (or São Diniz) island and as Insula Columbi.

Although the Azores were inhabited since 1439, settlement on Pico only started in the 1480s when Pico became part of the neighboring island of Faial's control. Pico is thought to be the last of the islands of the Central Group to be occupied.

In a letter dated March 28, 1481, the administrator of the Azores, D. Beatriz, gave the possession of the island of Pico to the first captain of the donatarie, D. Álvaro d'Ornelas, a resident of island of Madeira, on the condition that he populate the island ('Captains', often of noble heritage, obtained land rights in regions not important enough to merit a 'governor', and were a cheap way for the state to settle new territory). d'Ornelas failed to attract settlers, so on December 29, 1482, the Flemish captain of the island of Faial, 7 km from Pico, Jós d'Hutra, became the new captain. The transfer of the island of Pico to Jós d'Hutra not only confirms that Pico was not colonized at the end of the 15th century, but also demonstrates the interest in boosting the insular population of the islands of the central group. This was understandable given the growing geo-economic importance of the Azores archipelago at that time, as the Portuguese monarchy was expanding into Morocco and along the west African coast.

Population grew slowly, in part because of difficulties cultivating wheat. By 1587, there were less than 3,000 inhabitants. Soil quality is conditioned by the volcanic soils consisting mostly of lightly weathered recent basalt (designated as "biscoitos" or "mistérios"). Examples include the Mistério de São João, resulting from a 1718 eruption. In addition, there are few rivers on the island compared to other parts of the archipelago. The last eruptions of magma took place in 1718 and 1720 and generated three volcanic cinder cones (Mistérios): Santa Luzia and São João in 1718 and Silveira in 1720.

Aside from a few slaves sent to herd sheep in isolation before European settlement, the island's first inhabitants were primarily Portuguese, but of diverse origins. Settlers of Portuguese origin arrived from different parts of the metropolis, some passing through Madeira Island or other Azorean islands, particularly Terceira. Some inhabitants had noble origins, owning land and goods; there were secular and regular clergy, especially the Franciscans; and another group consisted of merchants, craftsmen, farmers and artisans. A small number of Jews came from the beginning of the 16th century, and there were indentured slaves of African origin at this time who farmed and did domestic work. The first municipality in Pico was established at Lajes, where fresh water was available (the place-name, Ribeiras, attests to this).

Around 9,000 lived on Pico by 1695. Pico moved "up the ladder" of urban hierarchies from fifth largest centre in the Azores to fourth, behind São Miguel, Terceira and Faial. By the middle of the 18th century, the population was over 19,000 people. In 1542, the inhabitants of the north of the island asked King João III to create a second village, to allow better law and order in a frontier economy with theft and corruption. São Roque do Pico was established. It was only much later, when the link between the islands of Pico and Faial strengthened further, that there was a need to create a third municipality; Madalena was established in 1723 (the larger town of Horta is 7 km away on Faial, and was where many of the island's property-owners and winemakers lived).

The islands of Pico and Faial were administered jointly until 1766, when Pico became an integral part of the Province of the Azores, led by a captain-general based in Angra. Centralizing governance in this way had poor success: in 1836, the people of Pico were integrated into a smaller administrative unit again, the third Azorean district, with the islands of Faial, Flores and Corvo.

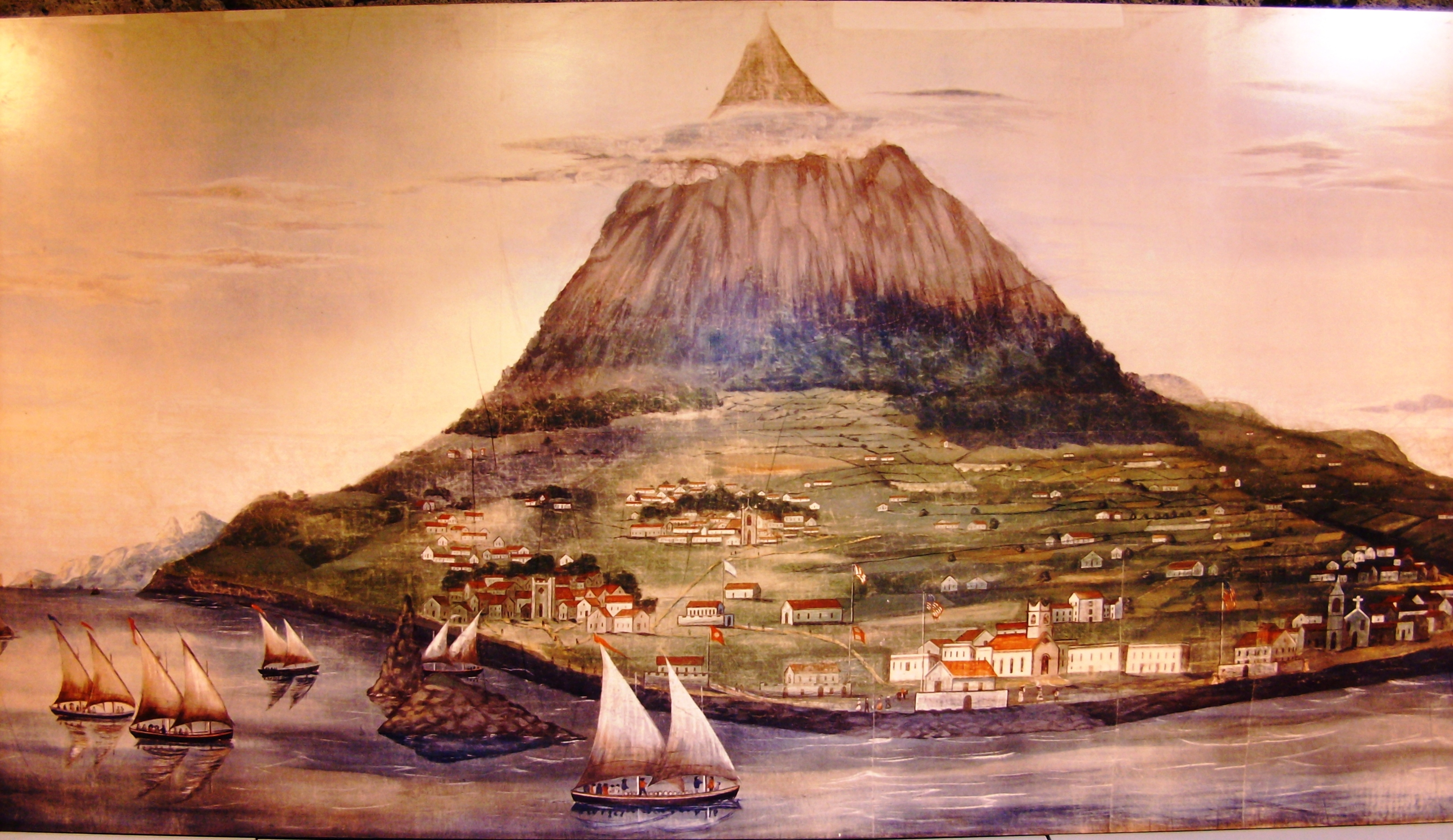
The town of Madalena, circa 1848

Settlers initially farmed wheat and some olives in addition to developing a woad industry, as on Faial (based on lichens that were exported to Flanders to produce commercial dyes). The two islands often shared livelihood activities Viticulture, helped by the richer soils found in suitable micro-climates, then grew rapidly. The industry was disturbed by the last volcanic eruptions, but viticulture expanded commercial livelihood opportunities considerably. Pico's famous verdelho wine production, dating back two centuries, was widely appreciated in many countries (including England and in the Americas and even in the palaces of the Russian czars). Viticulture declined with the spread of powdery mildew and phylloxera during the middle of the 19th century, creating a crisis on the island that lasted until the 20th century.

The other major economic activity was whaling. The presence of American and British whalers in the waters of the Azores at the end of the 18th century stabilized the economy. Spermwhale hunting became the primary industry around the island until it was abolished in 1986. The whale factory is now a museum.

== Geography ==
=== Physical geography ===
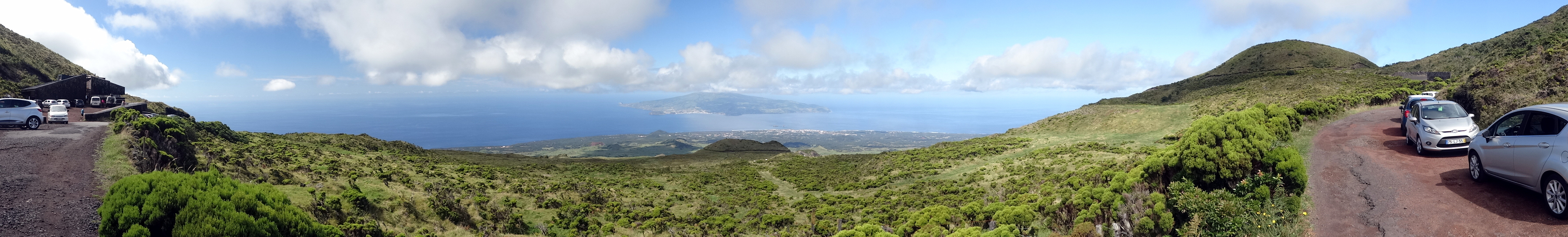
Panorama of the westernmost part of the island, and Faial Island at a distance

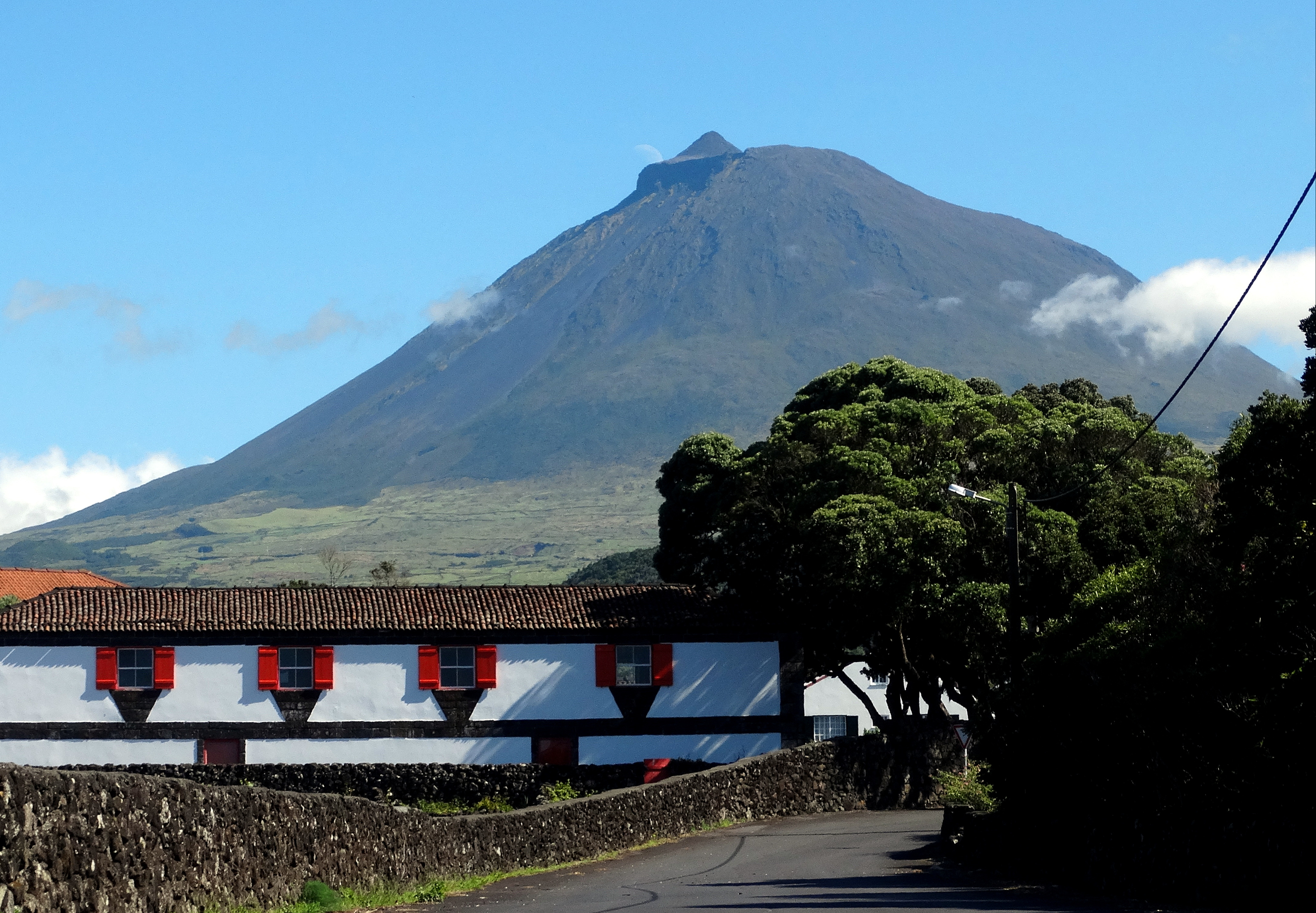
View of the stratovolcano near the Pico Wine Museum

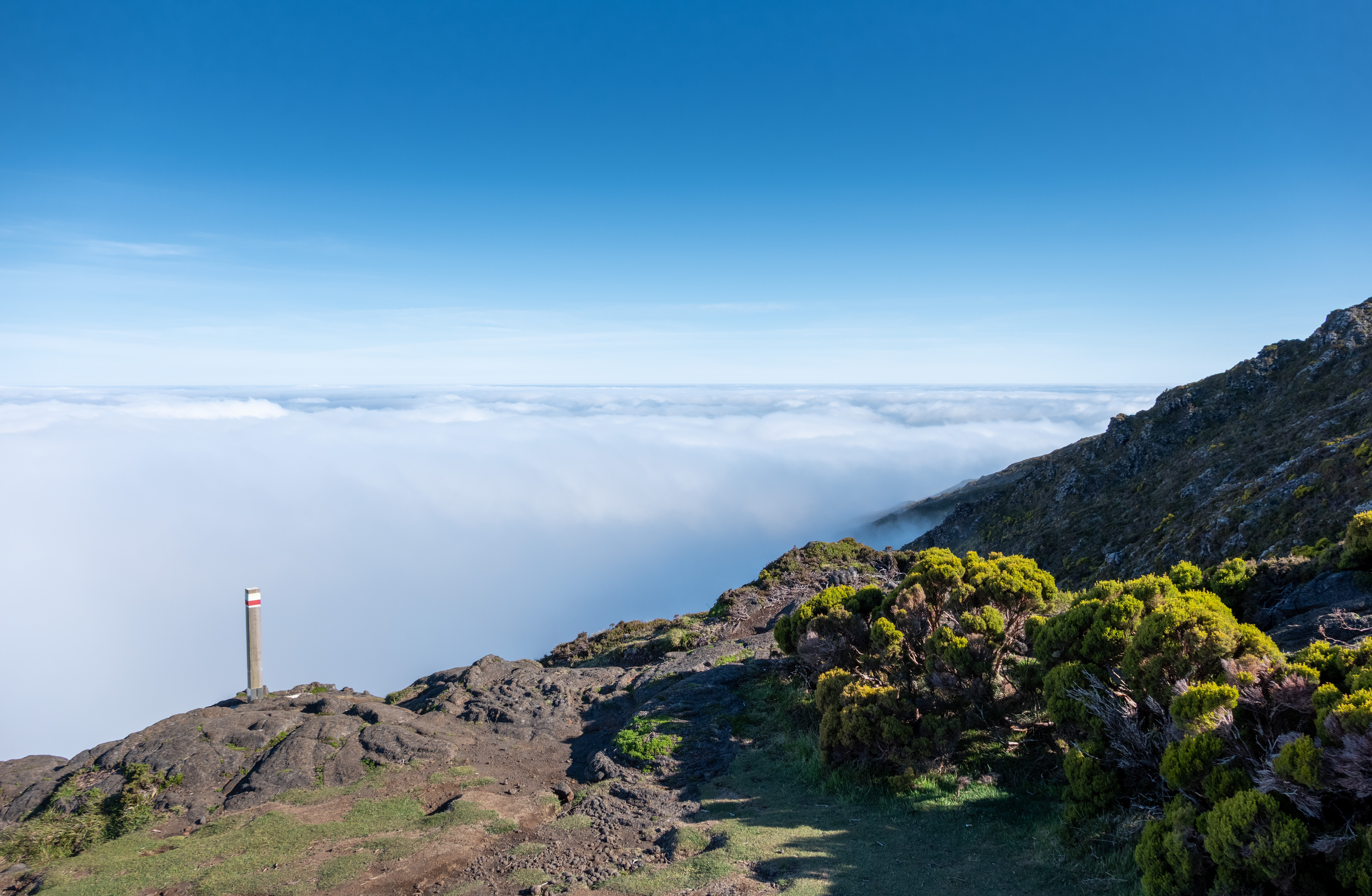
High altitude area of the island, showing cloud cover adjacent to the summit

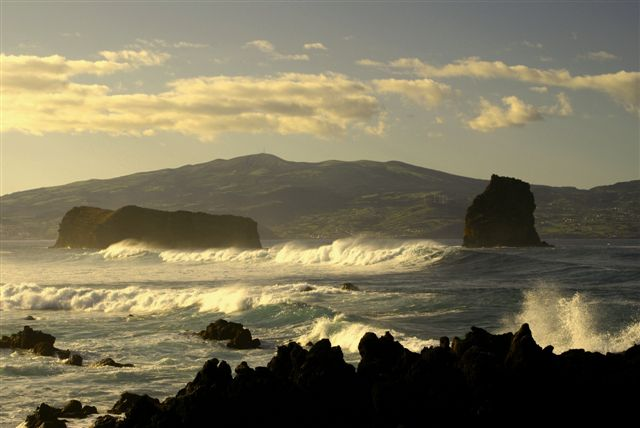
The two islets at the entrance to Madalena harbor, formed from a submerged crater

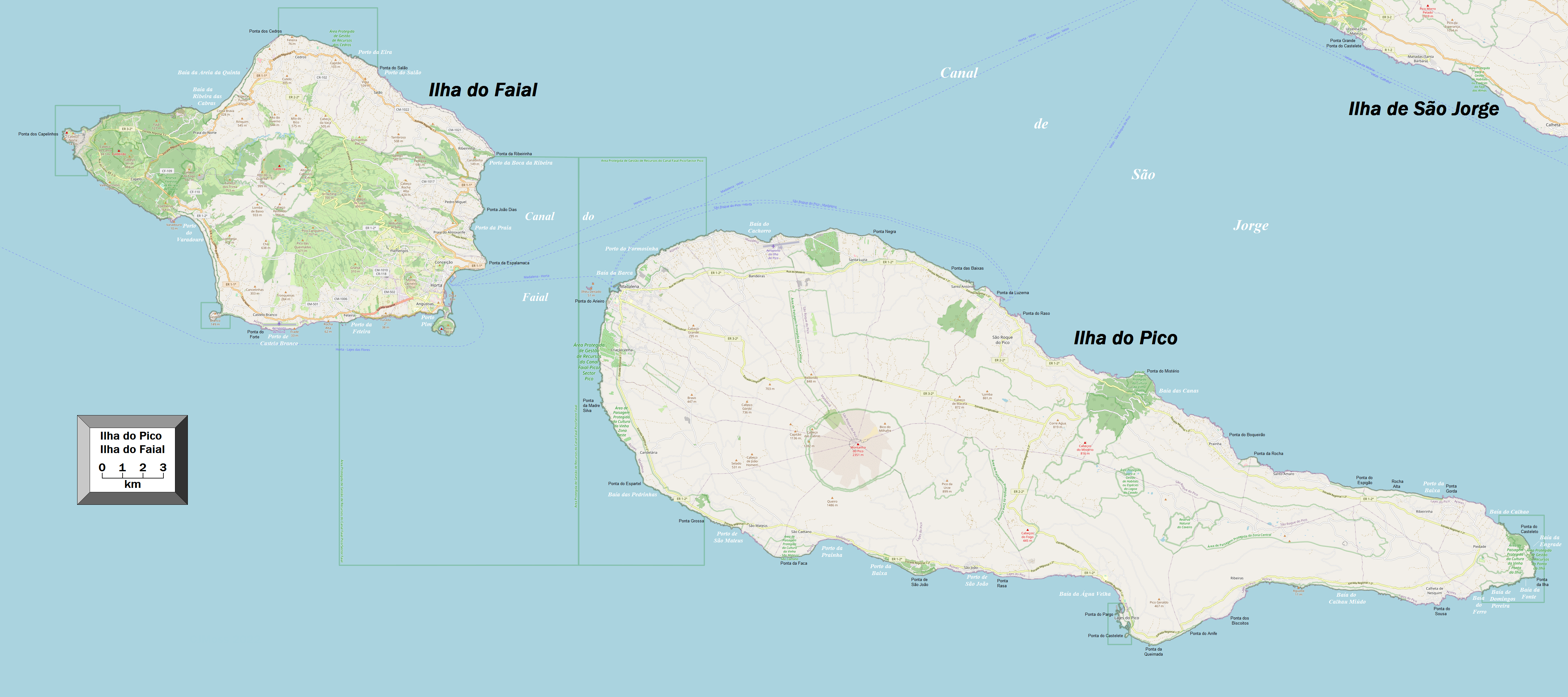
Detailed map of Pico and neighbouring Faial

The island is 17.5 km south of São Jorge and just 7 km east of Faial, in the Central Group of islands, an area that is colloquially known as O Triângulo (The Triangle). Pico is 46.3 kilometers long, and at its maximum extent about 16 kilometers wide; making it the second largest of the Azores islands. The 151.8 km coastline is slightly indented with inlets and coves. Accessibility to the sea poses no difficulties, except in sections with plunging, unstable cliffs, subject to frequent landslides (as seen in the northeast and southeast). Seabirds find favorable conditions for nesting in these habitats, in particular the species of Tern (Sterna hirundo and Sterna dougallii) and Shearwater (Calonectris borealis). The rocky substrates prevail throughout the coast (slabs that alternate with rolled pebbles), there are no sandy beaches, but there are numerous tide pools and natural inlets used for bathing.

Along the central plain of volcano cones to the eastern coast, the landscape is pitted with the remnants of craters and lake-filled cones, and dominated by the ancient volcano of Topo. Geomorphologically, the island is composed of three units:

- Topo Volcano - Located on the southernmost side of the island, it corresponds to an ancient shield volcano created by the overlap of various lava flows and destroyed by erosion and landslides;
- Achada Plateau - Extending from the east side of the island to the stratovolcano, the Achada Plateau is an axial zone comprising spatter and lava cones along a mountainous ridge filled with lake-filled craters, dense scrub and forests. Cones in this region are oriented along a west-northwest and south-southeast axis along a path east to west between the other volcanic structures;
- Pico Volcano - It occupies the western portion of the island, and corresponds to a central volcano with 2,351 m (7,713 ft) in altitude, created by numerous Hawaiian and Strombolian eruptions. Along its flanks are diverse lava and spatter cones that are formed along radial fractures and faults.

Pico Island's tectonic structures are generally oriented along a west-northwest to east-southeast and a northeast to southwest axis. The main axis controls the main structures, especially the main mountain of Pico, while the secondary axes affect the radial fractures and faults along the central plain and eastern volcano.

Similar to the geomorphological structures described above, the volcanic landforms have been identified by Madeira (1998) in the following units:

- Volcanic Complex of Lajes - pertains to the oldest volcanic structures, comprising volcanoes, lavas and debris that are between 35 and 300,000 thousand years old; it makes up the structures of the eastern part of the island, including the ancient volcano of Topo.
- Volcanic Complex of Calheta de Nesquim - dating to about 230,000 thousand years ago, this is a fissural zone of cones and basaltic lavas, associated with the Achada Plain, and the many faults along the central plateau of the island.
- Volcanic Complex of Madalena - the most recent volcanic complex, with both geological and historical eruptions; it includes the basaltic stratovolcano of Pico, but also many of the cones, faults and lava fields that circle the 2,351 meter summit.

The last volcanic eruption (which is debatable) occurred in 1963, in a small submarine eruption off the northwest coast (north of Cachorro in Santa Luzia). Prior to this, major volcanic activity was evident in lava fields generated in only the areas of Prainha (1562–64), Santa Luzia (1718), São João (1718) and Silveira (1720). The paths of the lava flows are still visible; those in the 16th century and 1718 were particularly substantial, extending for over 10 km. Today, the only visible evidence of active volcanism appears on the summit of Pico, in the base and interior of the Piqueninho (the mini-peak on the summit); there are irregular emissions from cracks in this zone. Additionally, there are emissions on the eastern flanks between 1500 and 2000 meters altitude. There have also been found areas of de-gasification along the fault associated with the Lagoa do Capitão and another in the Topo Volcano, as well as a spring rich in CO_{2} in the area of Silveira.

=== Earthquakes ===
Pico, much like the other islands, is susceptible to seismic events, although their epicenters have primarily been localized in the Faial-Pico or Pico-São Jorge Channels. Only three significant tectonic earthquakes have hit the island of Pico since the beginning of settlement: The 1757 earthquake, which caused significant damage in the eastern region of the island including the death of 11 people and the collapse of a church and a few houses; the 1973 seismic crisis (October 1973 – May 1974) in which the main earthquake (with magnitude 5.5) did considerable damage to 604 houses in Faial and 2,000 in Pico, which left nearly 5,000 people homeless; and the July 9, 1998 earthquake, the strongest earthquake registered in the last 30 years, which had its epicenter 5 kilometers northeast of Ponta da Ribeirinha, on the island of Faial, reaching a 5.8 magnitude. It was felt on Pico, with a maximum intensity level of VII on the Mercalli scale; some homes were damaged and possessions were buffeted. Other violent earthquakes which have affected the island include: the 1957–58 seismic events associated with the eruption of the Capelinhos volcano (on Faial), the February 1964 earthquake on the island of São Jorge, and the 1926 earthquake, whose epicenter was registered in the Faial–Pico Channel.

=== Biome ===
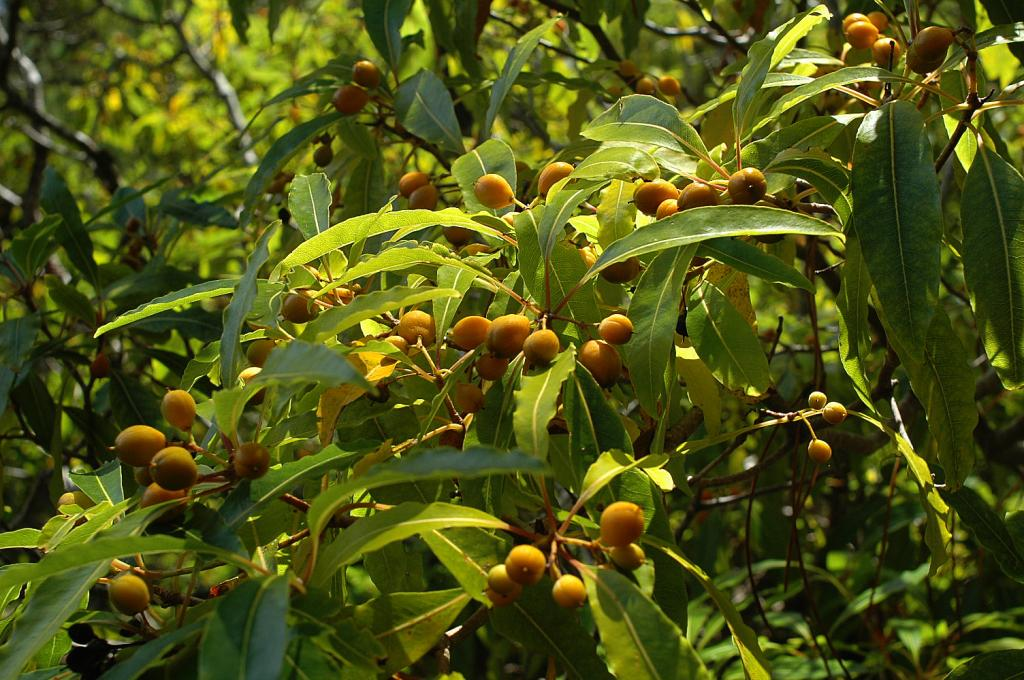
Pittosporum undulatum, here depicted on Pico, is one of the most invasive plant species on the island

According to the 2018 land occupation chart of the Azores, compared to the other islands of the archipelago, Pico has, both by proportion and total land area, the largest area of intact native laurisilva forests, and broadleaf forests (which includes introduced species such as Pittosporum undulatum), that occupy, respectively, 2.9% and 30% of the island. Pico is the only island in the Azores where pasture and meadow are not the dominant landscape (accounting only for around 29% of the territory).

Like the remaining islands of the Azores, Pico suffered extensive deforestation following its occupation. While some land, especially at the coast, was used for housing, the majority was and is still used for farming, livestock and the wood industry (of Cryptomeria). Additionally, several introductions of exotic species in the 19th century, like Hydrangea macrophylla, Pittosporum undulatum, Hedychium gardnerianum and Psidium cattleyanum, resulted in invasion and destruction of the remaining native habitats.

Gaspar Frutuoso gave a brief description of the island's flora only a century after being occupied:

"All around this island, there is abundant and thick wood of cedar [Juniperus brevifolia], sanguinho [Frangula azorica], ginja [Prunus lusitanica], pau branco [Picconia azorica], faias [Myrica faya], laurels [Laurus azorica], and above all, the yew wood [Taxus baccata], found solely on Pico [...] There are many trees: Cedar, pau branco, laurel, faia, tamujo [Myrsine africana], heaths [Erica azorica] as large as trees, sanguinhos, zimbro and laurustinus [Viburnum treleasei] [...]"

— Gaspar Frutuoso, late 16th century, Saudades da Terra, Book VI

Over a third of the Natura 2000 protected areas of the Azores are located on Pico. It has also the largest number of volcanic cavities (lava caves) of anywhere in the archipelago, 86 out of 225.

=== Climate ===
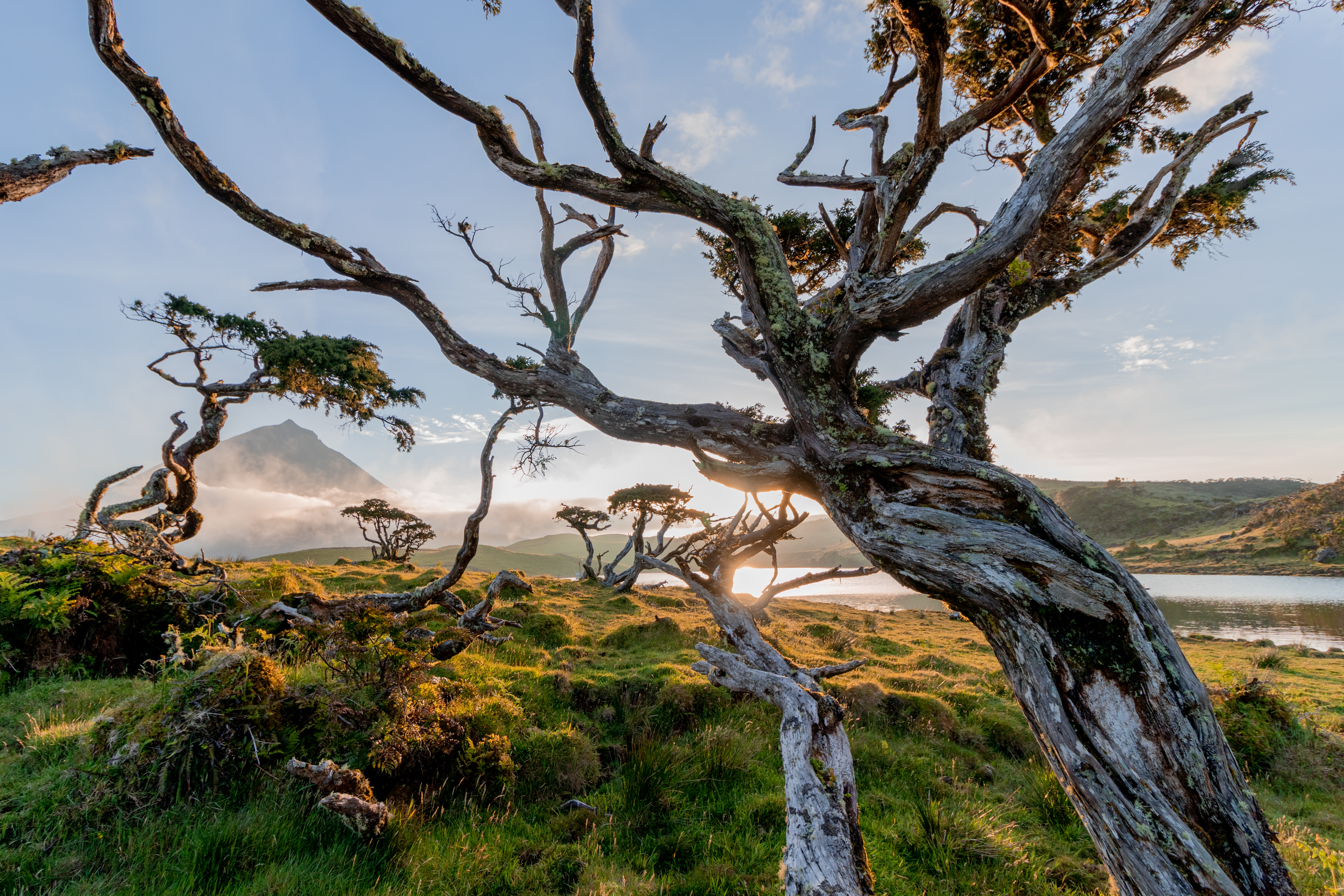
The climate on the highlands of Pico is characterized by cool temperatures and extreme humidity. The photo shows the few Azores junipers that remain near the shores of Lagoa do Capitão

Pico, like the other islands in the archipelago, has a mild maritime climate with high precipitation and high humidity for most of the year. However, due to its distinctive topographic variation, temperature and precipitation levels vary significantly depending on altitude and location, with rainfall generally more concentrated in the east. Temperatures fluctuate by approximately 8 °C (14.4 °F) between the coolest month, February, and the warmest month, August.

At lower elevations, where most of the population resides, Pico has a humid subtropical climate (Köppen: Cfa; Thornthwaite: B) with mild, rainy winters (mean around 14.5 °C (58.1 °F)) and warm, noticeably drier summers, (mean around 22 °C (72 °F)) although generally not dry enough to be classified as Mediterranean. It has an average annual temperature of 17.5–18 °C (63.5–64.4 °F) and around 1,000 to 1,600 mm (39 to 63 in) of precipitation fall each year, though values as high as 2,000 mm (79 in) are typical on the central northeast coast (São Roque, Prainha and Santo Amaro). Because of its high relative humidity (around 80%), summers can feel slightly warmer than they really are.

At higher elevations, like the Achada Plateau, temperatures are cooler and precipitation increases, it therefore transitions into a wet oceanic climate (Köppen: Cfb; Thornthwaite: A), average relative humidity stays around 90% and fogs produced by the cooling of rising air masses from the ocean are persistent, which, in turn, creates an environment typical of a cloud forest. Places such as the Caiado and Paul lakes receive, respectively, 4,698 and 3,357 millimetres (185.0 and 132.2 in) of precipitation each year and Mount Pico is recognized as receiving the largest annual rainfall in Portugal (over 5,000 mm (200 in) per year at the northeastern flanks of the volcano).

At around 1,200 m (3,900 ft), the climate becomes subpolar oceanic (Cfc) (somewhat comparable to the Faroe Islands). As altitude surpasses 1,500 metres (4,900 ft) and exceeds the planetary boundary layer, both precipitation and humidity levels decrease reaching the top of Mount Pico which is estimated to receive only 500 millimetres (20 in) of precipitation. Temperatures at the peak of the stratovolcano (~2,300 metres (7,500 ft) a.s.l.) average 2 °C (36 °F) and snow can be frequently seen in the cooler months, being one of the few places in the archipelago where this phenomenon is possible. The climate is classified as alpine at the very top.

Pico has registered the highest temperature ever recorded in the Azores, 32.1 °C (89.8 °F) on 7 September 1985 at Pico Airport and although there are no climatic stations at Mount Pico, it is likely that the island has also experienced the lowest temperatures in the archipelago at the top of the mountain.

Climate data for Pico Airport, Bandeiras, Madalena, Pico Island, Azores
Month	Jan	Feb	Mar	Apr	May	Jun	Jul	Aug	Sep	Oct	Nov	Dec	Year
Mean daily maximum °C (°F)	16.6 (61.9)	16.2 (61.2)	16.7 (62.1)	17.6 (63.7)	19.3 (66.7)	21.6 (70.9)	24.1 (75.4)	25.3 (77.5)	24.2 (75.6)	21.6 (70.9)	19.1 (66.4)	17.5 (63.5)	20.0 (68.0)
Daily mean °C (°F)	14.5 (58.1)	13.9 (57.0)	14.4 (57.9)	15.2 (59.4)	16.7 (62.1)	19.0 (66.2)	21.3 (70.3)	22.4 (72.3)	21.4 (70.5)	19.2 (66.6)	16.9 (62.4)	15.4 (59.7)	17.5 (63.5)
Mean daily minimum °C (°F)	12.4 (54.3)	11.7 (53.1)	12.2 (54.0)	12.8 (55.0)	14.2 (57.6)	16.4 (61.5)	18.5 (65.3)	19.6 (67.3)	18.7 (65.7)	16.8 (62.2)	14.8 (58.6)	13.4 (56.1)	15.1 (59.2)
Average rainfall mm (inches)	109.5 (4.31)	113.8 (4.48)	97.0 (3.82)	68.1 (2.68)	77.0 (3.03)	35.9 (1.41)	31.2 (1.23)	63.0 (2.48)	91.4 (3.60)	130.6 (5.14)	147.3 (5.80)	144.2 (5.68)	1,109 (43.66)
Average relative humidity (%)	80	80	80	79	81	81	80	80	80	79	80	81	80
Source 1: climate-data.org
Source 2: IPMA (precipitation), (humidity from the neighboring city of Horta)

Climate data for Cabeço do Teicho, 2017-2024, altitude: ~ 850 m (2,790 ft)
Month	Jan	Feb	Mar	Apr	May	Jun	Jul	Aug	Sep	Oct	Nov	Dec	Year
Record high °C (°F)	19.9 (67.8)	20.5 (68.9)	19.3 (66.7)	18.2 (64.8)	21.5 (70.7)	24.0 (75.2)	24.6 (76.3)	25.3 (77.5)	23.3 (73.9)	23.5 (74.3)	22.9 (73.2)	18.7 (65.7)	25.3 (77.5)
Mean maximum °C (°F)	17.3 (63.1)	17.4 (63.3)	17.2 (63.0)	16.6 (61.9)	19.7 (67.5)	21.4 (70.5)	23.6 (74.5)	24.4 (75.9)	22.9 (73.2)	21.7 (71.1)	19.2 (66.6)	17.3 (63.1)	24.4 (75.9)
Mean daily maximum °C (°F)	11.8 (53.2)	11.9 (53.4)	12.1 (53.8)	12.6 (54.7)	14.8 (58.6)	16.6 (61.9)	19.7 (67.5)	20.7 (69.3)	18.9 (66.0)	16.6 (61.9)	14.3 (57.7)	12.4 (54.3)	15.2 (59.4)
Daily mean °C (°F)	9.6 (49.3)	8.9 (48.0)	9.2 (48.6)	9.9 (49.8)	11.7 (53.1)	13.5 (56.3)	16.4 (61.5)	17.5 (63.5)	16.0 (60.8)	13.9 (57.0)	11.8 (53.2)	10.1 (50.2)	12.4 (54.3)
Mean daily minimum °C (°F)	7.2 (45.0)	6.1 (43.0)	6.5 (43.7)	7.4 (45.3)	8.7 (47.7)	10.5 (50.9)	13.3 (55.9)	14.5 (58.1)	13.4 (56.1)	11.4 (52.5)	9.5 (49.1)	7.8 (46.0)	9.7 (49.4)
Mean minimum °C (°F)	3.1 (37.6)	1.9 (35.4)	2.7 (36.9)	3.5 (38.3)	5.0 (41.0)	7.1 (44.8)	8.8 (47.8)	10.8 (51.4)	9.6 (49.3)	7.0 (44.6)	4.9 (40.8)	3.5 (38.3)	1.4 (34.5)
Record low °C (°F)	1.6 (34.9)	1.3 (34.3)	0.7 (33.3)	2.7 (36.9)	2.7 (36.9)	4.2 (39.6)	7.5 (45.5)	8.5 (47.3)	8.9 (48.0)	4.9 (40.8)	3.9 (39.0)	2.1 (35.8)	0.7 (33.3)
Average precipitation mm (inches)	571.1 (22.48)	353.3 (13.91)	324.4 (12.77)	388.2 (15.28)	348.7 (13.73)	142.2 (5.60)	106.2 (4.18)	208.5 (8.21)	283.3 (11.15)	405.4 (15.96)	563.6 (22.19)	492.7 (19.40)	4,187.6 (164.86)
Average relative humidity (%)	91	89	90	90	89	90	89	90	91	91	92	91	90
Source: Direção Regional do Ambiente

=== Human geography ===
Population of Pico Island (1695–2019)
Year	Pop.	±%
1695	10,028	—
1747	19,748	+96.9%
1776	21,061	+6.6%
1795	22,310	+5.9%
1849	31,000	+39.0%
1900	24,500	−21.0%
1930	20,500	−16.3%
1960	21,837	+6.5%
1981	15,483	−29.1%
1991	15,202	−1.8%
2001	14,806	−2.6%
2011	14,148	−4.4%
2021	13,895	−1.8%

Geological, geomorphological and climatic constraints played (and still have) a determining role in economic activity, in the distribution of urban agglomerations and in demographic evolution. The settlement pattern is a good example of adaptation to the specific physical geography of this island, developing mainly along the coast and along the roads of communication. The main urban centers, municipality seats, are located by the sea: Madalena, São Roque do Pico and Lajes do Pico.

Regarding demographic behavior, the population has continued to decline since the middle of the last century, a trend that continues to the present day. However, the 1960s and 1970s were the decades that showed a more negative population variation rate, due to the intense emigration surge that was generated at this time and that was generalized to the entire archipelago. Unlike other islands in the Azores, in the 1990s the situation did not change, continuing to register a negative population variation (-2.6%), even higher than that registered in the 1980s. According to the XIV General Census of Population (INE, 2002), the population totaled 14,806 inhabitants, which represents a decrease of 396 inhabitants compared to 1991. In 2001, the municipality of Madalena had the largest population (6,136 inhabitants), followed by Lajes do Pico (5,041 inhabitants) and São Roque (3,629 inhabitants). The population density (33.3 inhabitants/km2) was among the lowest in the archipelago and the age structure showed signs of aging, with more than 50% of the population aged between 25 and 64 years, against 30% of young people and about 20% of seniors.

As of 2021, the total population is estimated to be around 13,895 inhabitants.

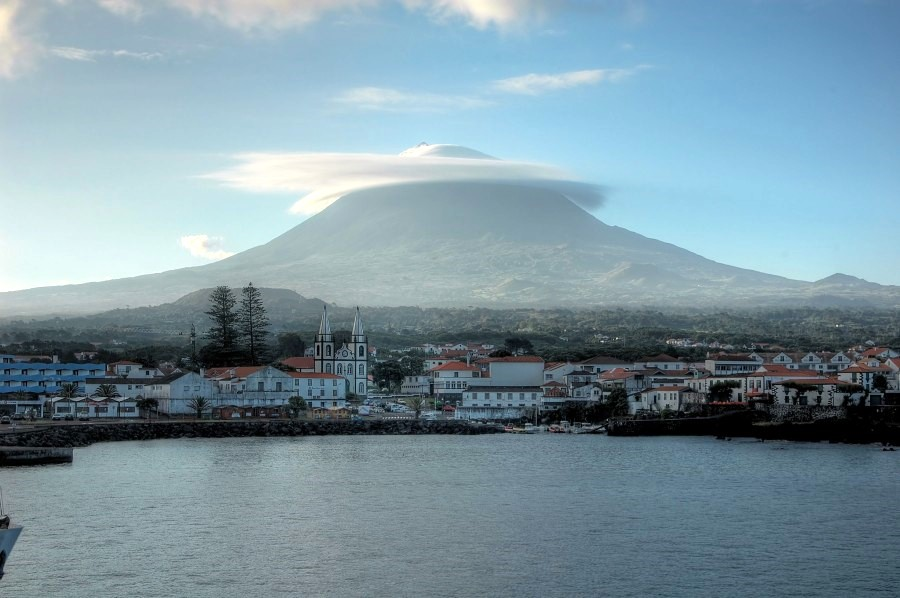
The village of Madalena at the western base of Mount Pico, as seen from the Faial-Pico Channel

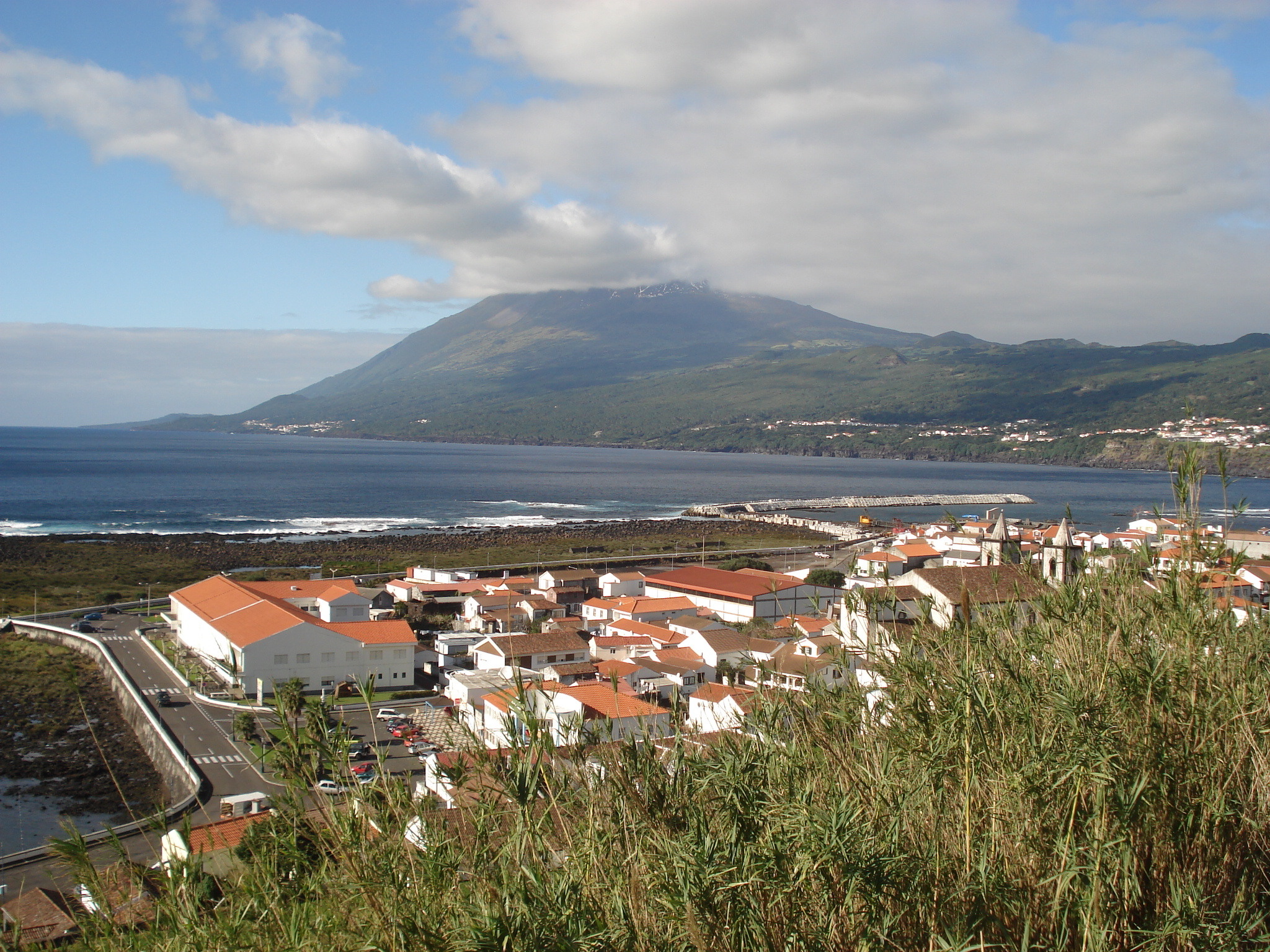
Lajes do Pico, along the south-central coast, with Mount Pico in the distance

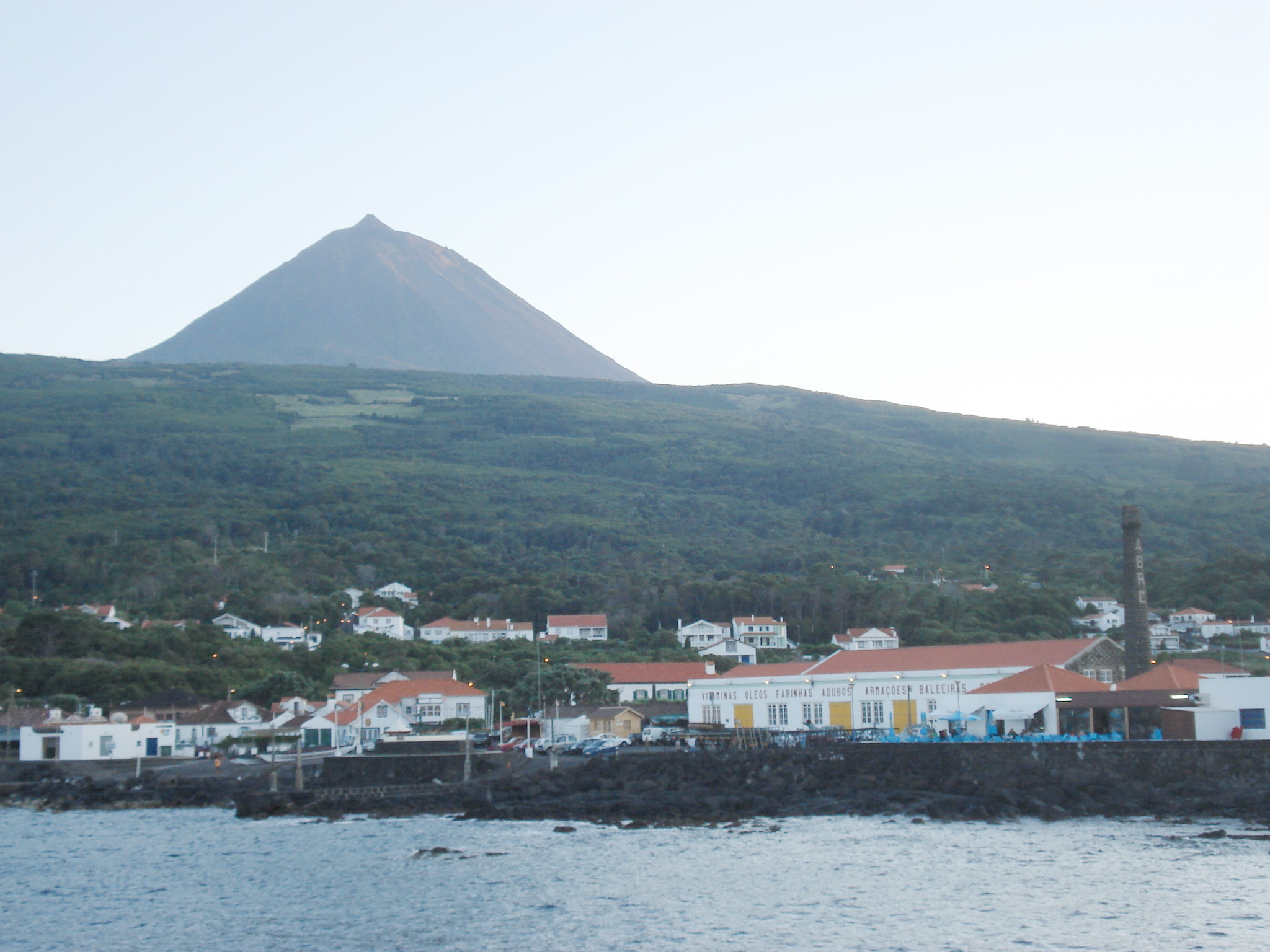
The port and historic centre of the civil parish of São Roque, showing the whaling museum, and former rendering factory along the coast

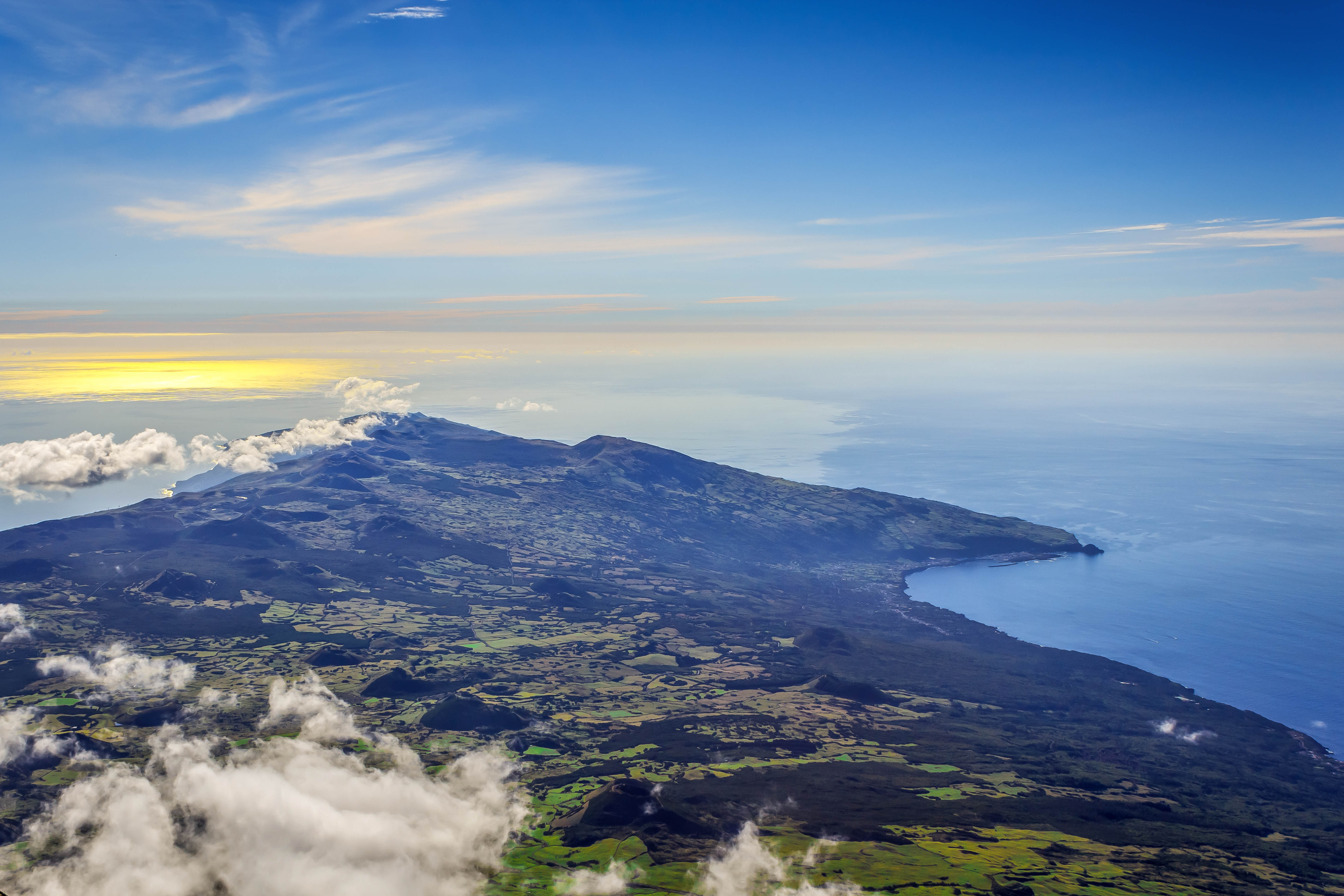
East side of the island, viewed from Mount Pico

== Economy ==
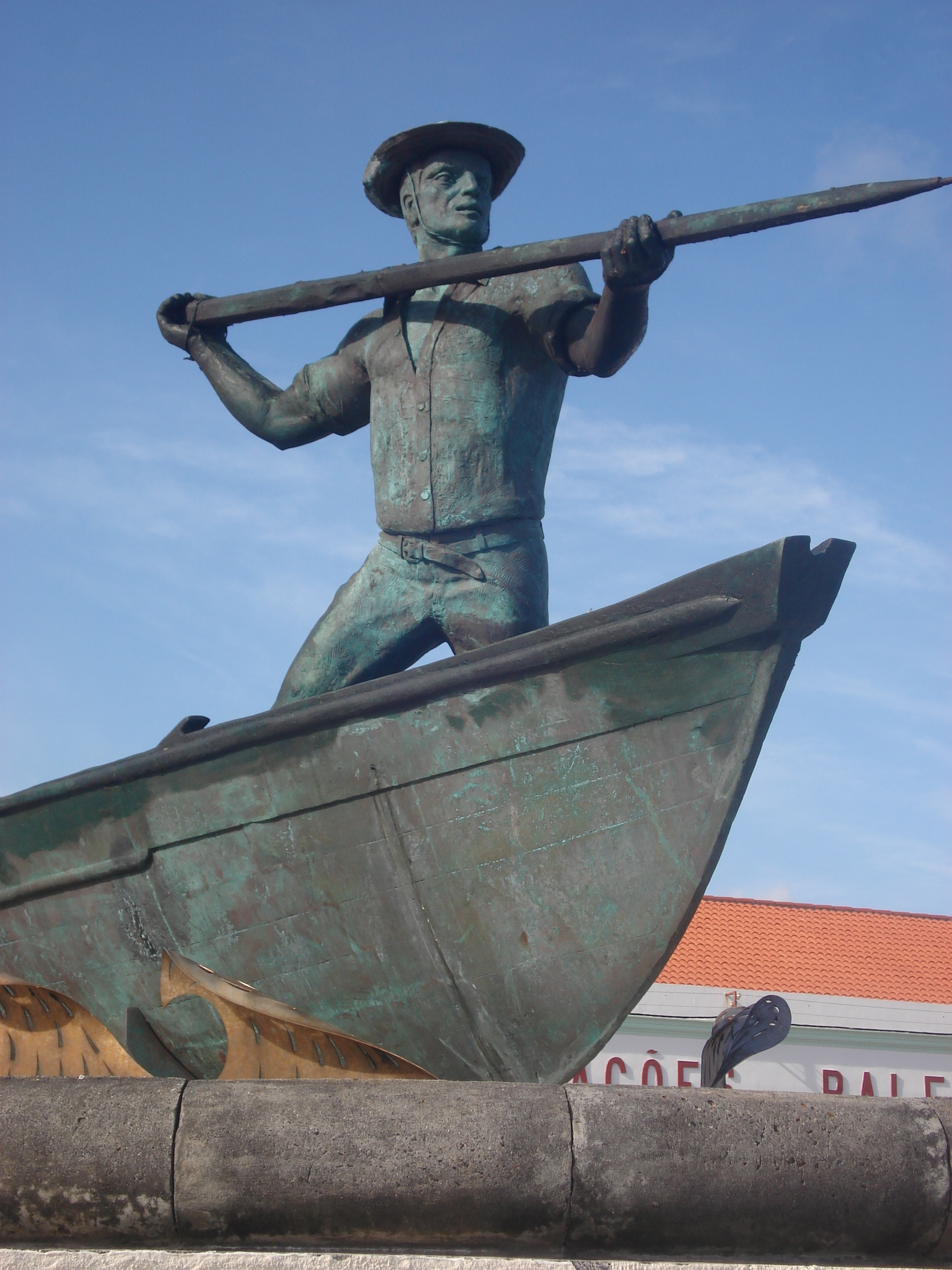
Whaling was once one of the main industries of Pico

Historically, Pico was largely dependent on Faial for its economic, political and social activities, and it still is to this day, although mitigated by the entrepreneurial dynamics of its population and by the centralities created by the autonomous regime. The close relations with the neighboring island are still established in the maritime routes that cross the channel daily. Fishing is one of the main activities of the primary sector, namely the capture of tuna for the canning industry, which mainly employs female labor in the processing of fish. Dairy farms supply raw material to the various cheese factories, whose product is highly appreciated for its artisanal characteristics (soft paste).

Currently, it is the secondary and tertiary activity sectors that have the greatest dynamism, occupying around 30% and 50% of the active population, respectively, due to the growth in the offer of services and the installation of branches of the regional administration, which generate specialized employment. The employment rate increased in the 1990s, from 35% to 40%, and contrary to the regional average, the unemployment rate remained stable from 1991 to 2001 (3.2%). However, the level of education is low, with most inhabitants having only the 1st cycle of basic education. Note that only 4.3% have higher education, which is lower than the regional average (5.2%). This situation, together with the still significant percentage of working people in the primary sector (20%), indicates an unfavorable panorama in terms of professional qualifications among the active population.

Like the other islands, tourism is also an emerging activity in Pico, seen as a strategic pillar for diversifying the economic base. The offer of accommodation has progressed, seeking to respond to the needs of an increasingly demanding destination, with five hotel units (hotels, pensions and others) and four for tourism in rural areas (2002). The support services to visitors and the establishments of restaurants, culture, car rental, tourist entertainment, among others, multiply. As the main whaling center in the Azores, economic agents knew how to transform whale watching into a flourishing business, through the reactivation of an ancestral activity with an undeniable heritage of historical and cultural interest (boats, whaling boats, lookouts, former manufacturing industries, etc.). The capture of sperm whales (Physeter macrocephalus) for oil extraction and production of meal for animal feed definitively ceased in the 1980s, due to the replacement of whale-derived products and compliance with international conventions. The first operator of «whale watching» was installed in Lajes do Pico, with around 26 companies linked to nautical activities.

=== Pico Wine and vine culture ===
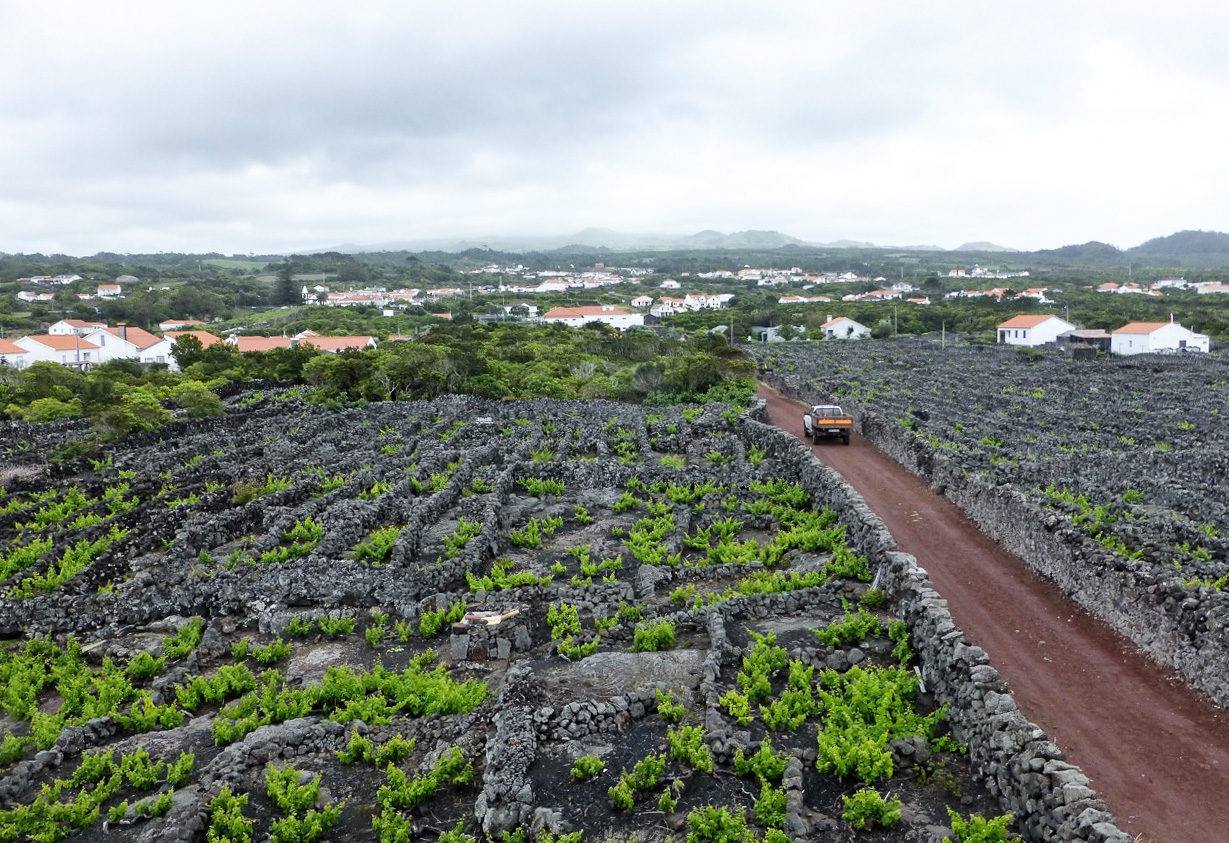
The typical lava stone walls protecting the vines

The vine culture on Pico Island began in the late 15th century, when the settlement of the island started. The Verdelho vines found ideal conditions to grow and mature in the volcanic soil and dark stone walls (currais). Later, it was exported to many countries in Europe and the Americas, and even reached the Russian court tables. Years later, wine production is not as important an economic activity as it used to be, despite trials to improve the varieties and incentives for the restoration of currais. The vineyards, which mark the island's landscape and ancestral cultural practices, are a UNESCO World Heritage Site since 2004 (see Landscape of the Pico Island Vineyard Culture).

== Sustainable tourism ==
In 2012, Pico received the QualityCoast Gold Award for its efforts to become a sustainable tourism destination. Because of this award, Pico was selected for inclusion in the global atlas for sustainable tourism DestiNet.

== Notable people ==
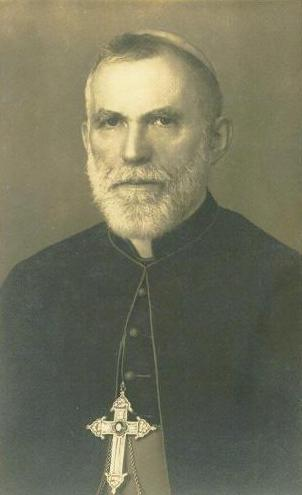
Jose Vieira Alvernaz

- José da Costa Nunes (1880 in Candelaria do Pico – 1976) a Cardinal of the Roman Catholic Church, Bishop of Macau, 1920-1940 and Patriarch of the East Indies, 1940–1953.
- José Vieira Alvernaz (1898 in Ribeirinha - 1986) a Portuguese prelate, Bishop of Cochin, Archbishop of Goa and Daman and Patriarch of the East Indies.
- Arquimínio Rodrigues da Costa (1924 in São Mateus – 2016) a prelate of the Catholic Church, Bishop of the Diocese of Macau, 1976–1988.
- Fernando Machado Soares (1930 in São Roque do Pico – 2014) a fado singer, poet, composer, jurist and retired judge.
- Caesar DePaço (born 1965 in Madalena) a businessman and former consul for both Portugal and Cape Verde.
- Duarte Freitas (born 1966 in São Roque do Pico) a politician and former Member of the European Parliament.

== Gallery ==
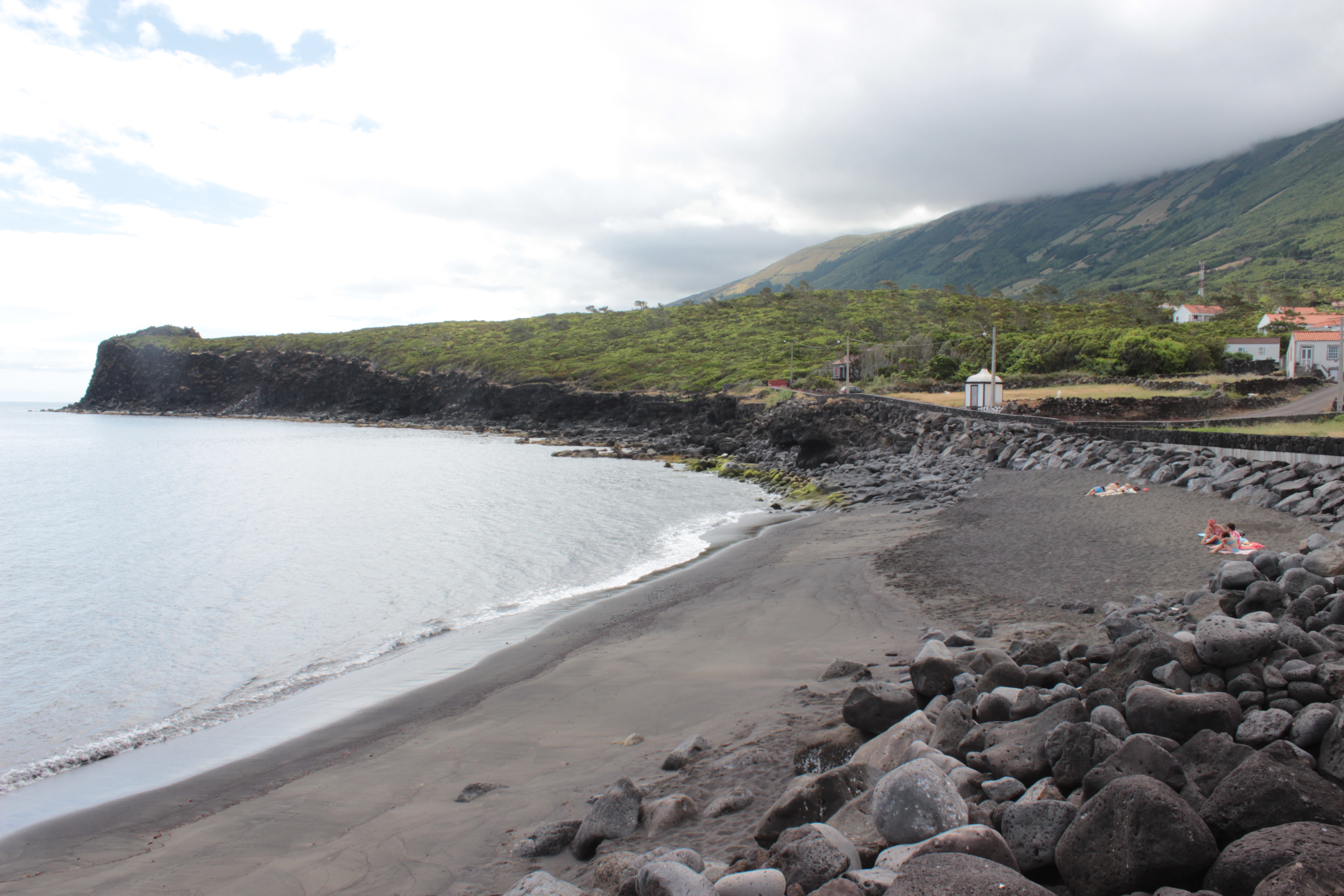
Black sand beach of Canto da Areia

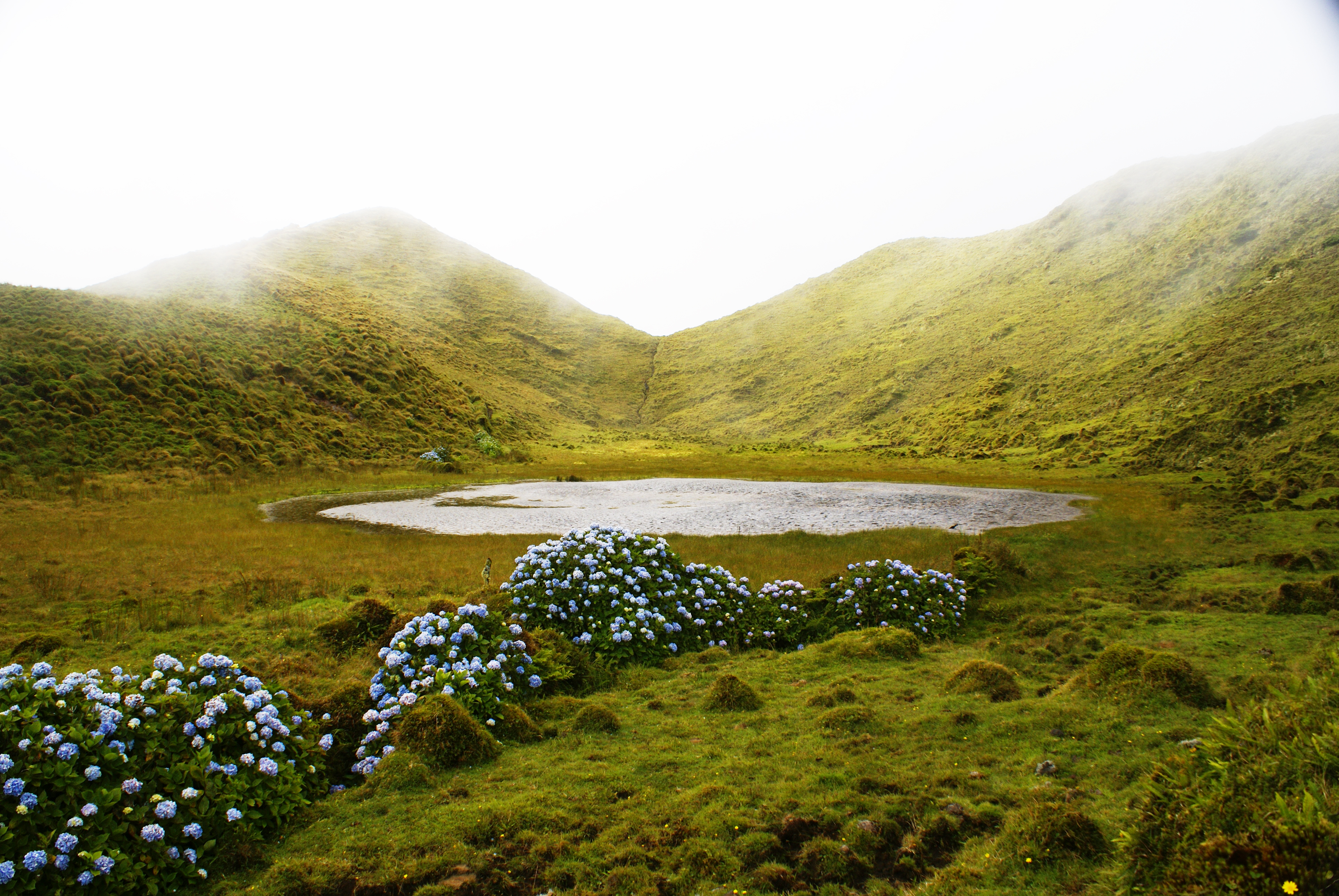
Grotões Pond

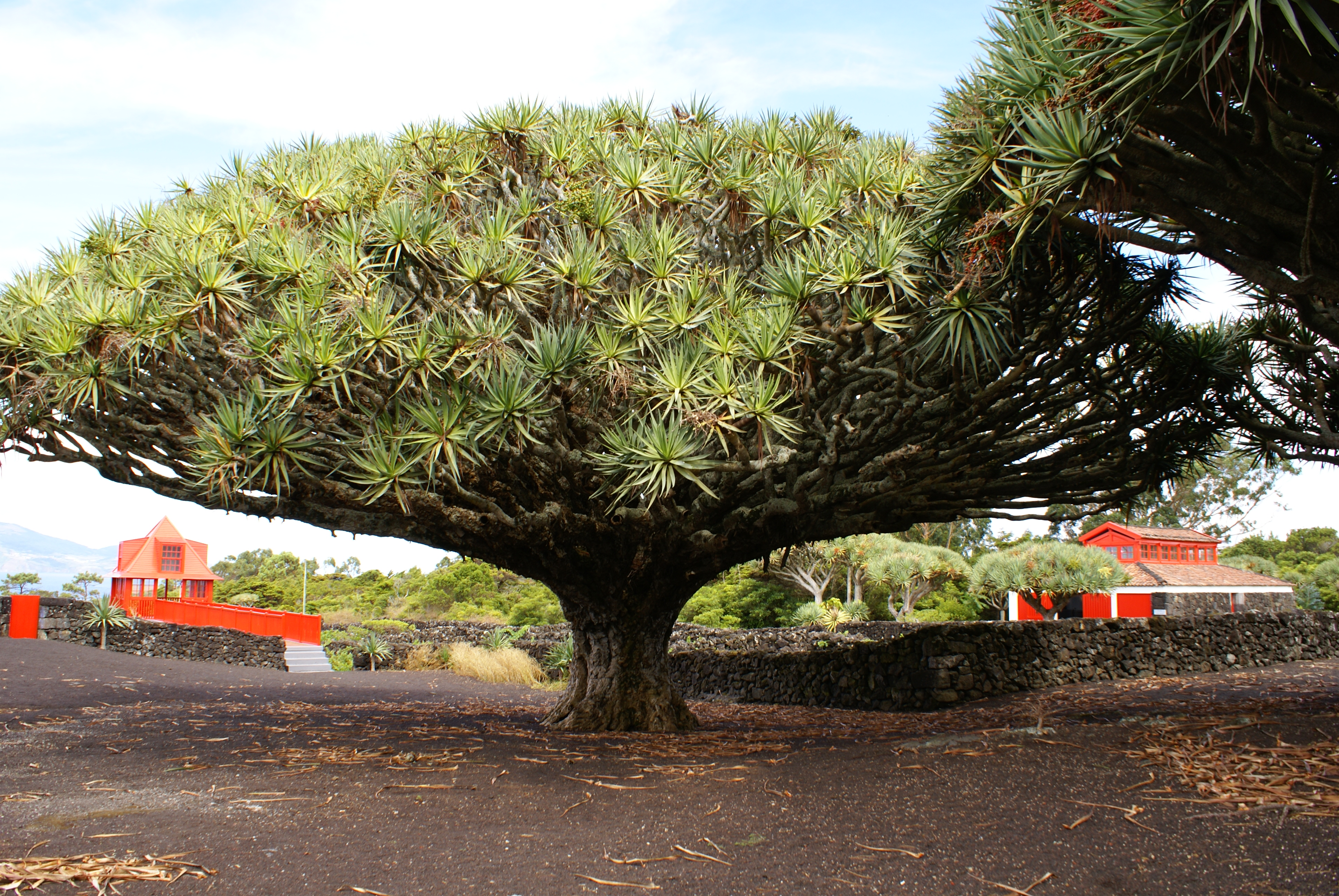
Old Dracaena draco near Pico's Wine Museum

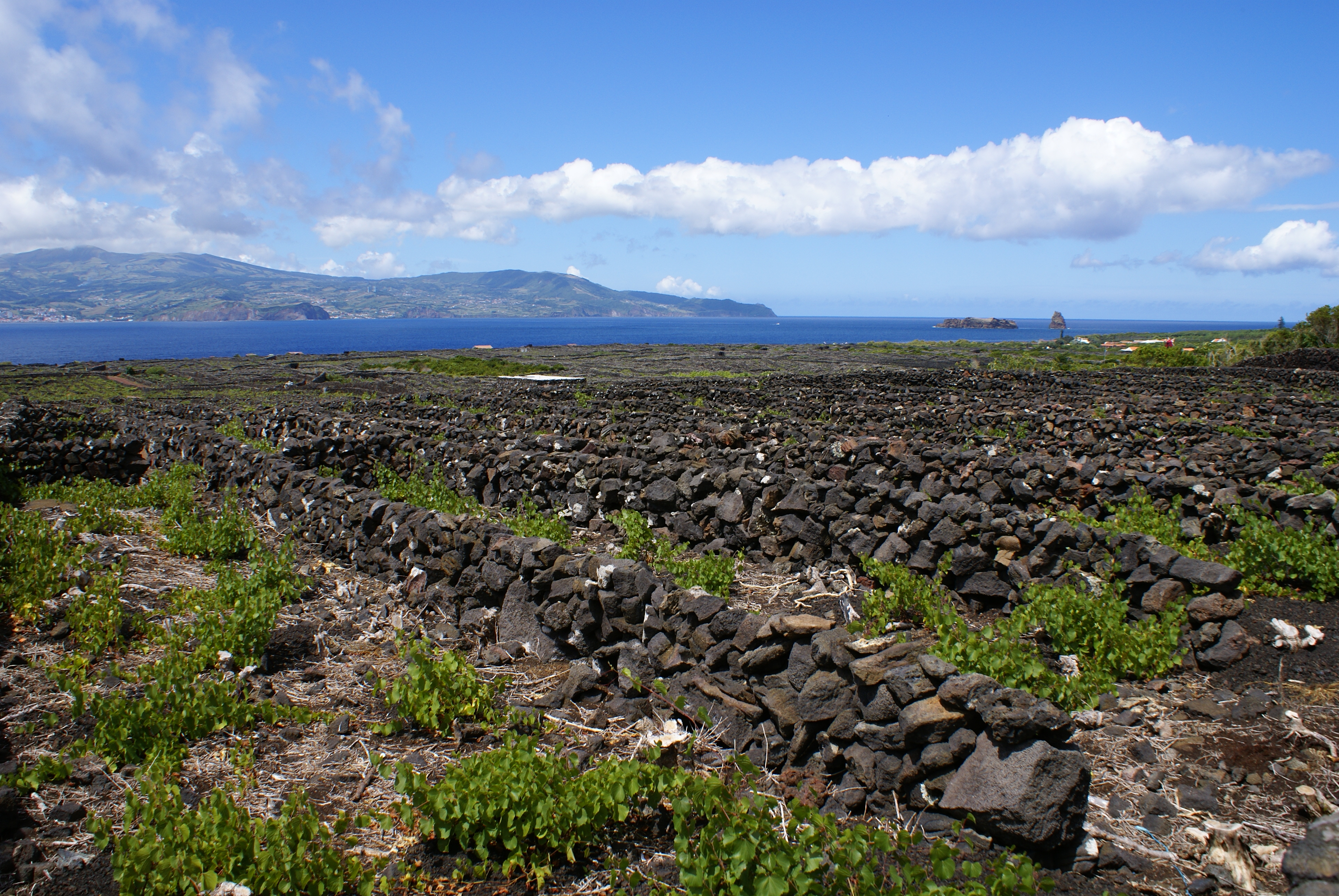
Pico IPR

== See also ==
- List of volcanoes in Azores
- Pico IPR
- Queijo do Pico
