= Simão Gonçalves da Câmara =

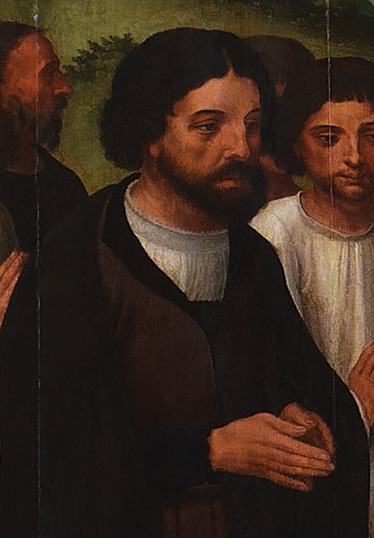
- Detail of the donor portrait of Simão Gonçalves da Câmara in the Triptych of St. James the Less and St. Philip, by Pieter Coecke van Aelst

3rd Donatary-Captain of Funchal
- In office 1501–1528
- Monarchs: Manuel I John III
- Preceded by: João Gonçalves da Câmara
- Succeeded by: João Gonçalves da Câmara

Personal details
- Born: 1463 Funchal, Madeira, Portugal
- Died: 1530 (aged 66–67) Matosinhos, Porto, Portugal
- Children: Manuel de Noronha

Simão Gonçalves da Câmara (1463 – 1530), known as the Magnificent (o Magnífico [u maɣˈnifiku]) due to the opulence of his household and the liberality of his character, was a Portuguese fidalgo and the third Donatary-Captain of Funchal. His term as governor of the southwestern half of Madeira Island coincided with its period of greatest prosperity. Simão da Câmara is noted for his support of the Portuguese campaigns in Northern Africa, and for the lavish embassy he sent Pope Leo X in thanks for the creation of the Diocese of Funchal in 1514.

== Biography ==
Simão Gonçalves da Câmara was born in the town of Funchal in Madeira Island, the son of the second Donatary-Captain, João Gonçalves da Câmara and his wife Maria de Noronha; he was the grandchild of João Gonçalves Zarco, who first settled the island. As a second-born son, he initially was called Simão de Noronha, having only after the death of his father changed his name to Simão Gonçalves da Câmara, by express determination of King Manuel I that the lineage and surname of the Câmaras was to be kept by those governing the captaincy.

His household was the second wealthiest in the country, surpassed only by that of the Dukes of Braganza. He became known as "the Magnificent" due to his liberality, opulent life, and generosity with which he repaid services done unto him; Gaspar Frutuoso says, in his nearly contemporary chronicle Saudades da Terra that "not a single person was ever denied anything from him, as he was of great and singular station, never setting aside what he had, and spending everything with great prudence in the service of his God and of his King."

=== Papal embassy ===
Among the many displays of lavishness and greatness of Simão da Câmara, the present he sent Pope Leo X in 1514, thanking him for the creation of the Diocese of Funchal, is particularly notable for its inventiveness; it was recorded by chronicler Jerónimo Dias Leite.

The offer was brought to the Pope by a large delegation of people dressed in dark velvet, in Portuguese fashion, led by Madeiran fidalgo João de Leiria and Vicente Martins, a canon of Funchal Cathedral who delivered a speech in Latin before the pontiff. The delegation was presented by Manuel de Noronha, a prelate in Rome (later Bishop of Lamego) and the younger son of Simão da Câmara himself. The gift was, along with an expensive Persian horse and many other products from the island, a miniature Apostolic Palace made out of sugar and real-size effigies of the Sacred College of Cardinals made in alfenim—at that time, sugarcane was the primary resource of the island's economy, as sugar from Madeira attracted Genoese and Flemish traders and flooded the major European markets.

=== Donatary-Captain of Funchal ===
During his time as Donatary-Captain of Funchal, Madeira attained a great level of prosperity as an important trade hub. The growing importance and development of the town of Funchal, made it so it was raised to the status of city by royal charter on 17 August 1508. On 12 June 1514, a papal bull instituted the Diocese of Funchal.

When King Manuel I appointed corregedor Diogo Taveira to investigate irregularities in the government of the captaincy, Simão Gonçalves da Câmara felt this constituted an attack on his privileges and exemptions and decided to leave the country and settle instead in Castile in 1516. Midway through the voyage, once having landed in the Algarve, he heard that the Portuguese city of Asilah in Morocco was under siege by the Wattasid Sultan; he immediately went there with a reinforcement of seven-hundred men and was instrumental in the end of the siege. When he was in Seville, resuming his interrupted voyage, he received a letter from King Manuel I, recognising the importance of his assistance in the military victory in Asilah, hoping to repay him with further honours if he were to return to Portugal, which he did.

In 1528, he abdicated from the captaincy of Funchal in favour of his son and successor, João Gonçalves da Câmara. He retired to Matosinhos, near Porto in Mainland Portugal, where he died in 1530. His will determined that his mortal remains were to be taken to Madeira Island, to be interred near those of his parents and grandparents in the Convent of Saint Clare, in Funchal.
