= Mongo the Magnificent =

Dr. Robert Frederickson
- First appearance: Shadow of a Broken Man (1977)
- Last appearance: Lord of Ice and Loneliness (2003)
- Created by: George C. Chesbro

In-universe information
- Alias: "Mongo the Magnificent"
- Gender: Male
- Occupation: Private detective; Criminologist; Former circus acrobat
- Nationality: American

Dr. Robert "Mongo" Fredrickson, a.k.a. Mongo the Magnificent, is a fictional private eye and criminologist who has dwarfism, appearing in several books by George C. Chesbro. His rather unusual nickname is actually his stage name, from his days as an acrobat in a circus (a career that is over by the time the book series begins). The novels are usually classified as mysteries, but frequently contain strong elements of speculative fiction such as extra-sensory perception and cryptozoology.

== Cultural impact ==
Marvel Comics has a supporting character Chesbro, a genius who is afflicted with dwarfism. He is the majordomo to the villain the Black Tarantula. Tom DeFalco, who created and authored Chesbro's first appearance in The Amazing Spider-Man #419, has confirmed that this is a tribute to the Mongo character.

== List of Novels ==
- Shadow of a Broken Man (1977) (ISBN 0-671-22696-7)
- City of Whispering Stone (1978) (ISBN 0-9674503-1-4)
- An Affair of Sorcerers (1979) (ISBN 0-671-24625-9)
- The Beasts of Valhalla (1985) (ISBN 0-689-11516-4)
- Two Songs This Archangel Sings (1987) (ISBN 0-689-11659-4)
- The Cold Smell of Sacred Stone (1988) (ISBN 0-689-11913-5)
- Second Horseman Out of Eden (1989) (ISBN 0-689-11979-8)
- The Language of Cannibals (1990) (ISBN 0-892-96394-8)
- In the House of Secret Enemies (1990) (ISBN 0-892-96395-6)
- The Fear in Yesterday's Rings (1991) (ISBN 0-892-96396-4)
- Dark Chant in a Crimson Key (1992) (ISBN 0-892-96463-4)
- An Incident at Bloodtide (1993) (ISBN 0-892-96464-2)
- Bleeding in the Eye of a Brainstorm (1995) (ISBN 1-930253-13-3)
- Dream of a Falling Eagle (1996) (ISBN 1-930253-14-1)
- Lord of Ice and Loneliness (2003) (ISBN 978-2-7436-1532-1) French translation, not published in the US.

== Potential adaptation ==
In 2005, Greenlight Pictures announced that they would be producing a motion picture, An Affair of Sorcerers, based on the book of the same name in the Mongo series, and that actor Peter Dinklage would be playing the central role of Mongo. Author George Chesbro wrote a screenplay for the project, but, unfortunately, the studio eventually vanished and the movie never happened.

In February 2014, If.com.au published an interview with writer Jason Monjo. He revealed that he has written the script for a pilot for an HBO series based on Chesbro's The Beasts of Valhalla, again starring actor Peter Dinklage. The pilot was to be produced by Ben Stiller's Red Hour Productions. As of 2021, the adaptation has not been produced.
