= Central Group, Azores =

Central Group
- Island Group
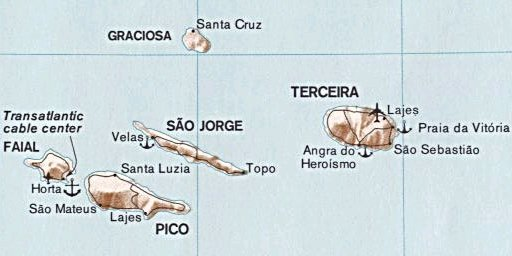
- Country: Portugal
- Autonomous Region: Azores
- Region: Atlantic Ocean
- Subregion: Mid-Atlantic Ridge
- Position: Azores Plateau
- Time zone: UTC−1 (AZOT)
  - Summer (DST): AZOST (UTC)

The Central Group is one of the island groups of the Azores, Portugal. It comprises the islands of Pico, Terceira, São Jorge, Faial and Graciosa.
