= Lagoa do Caiado =

Lake in the Azores

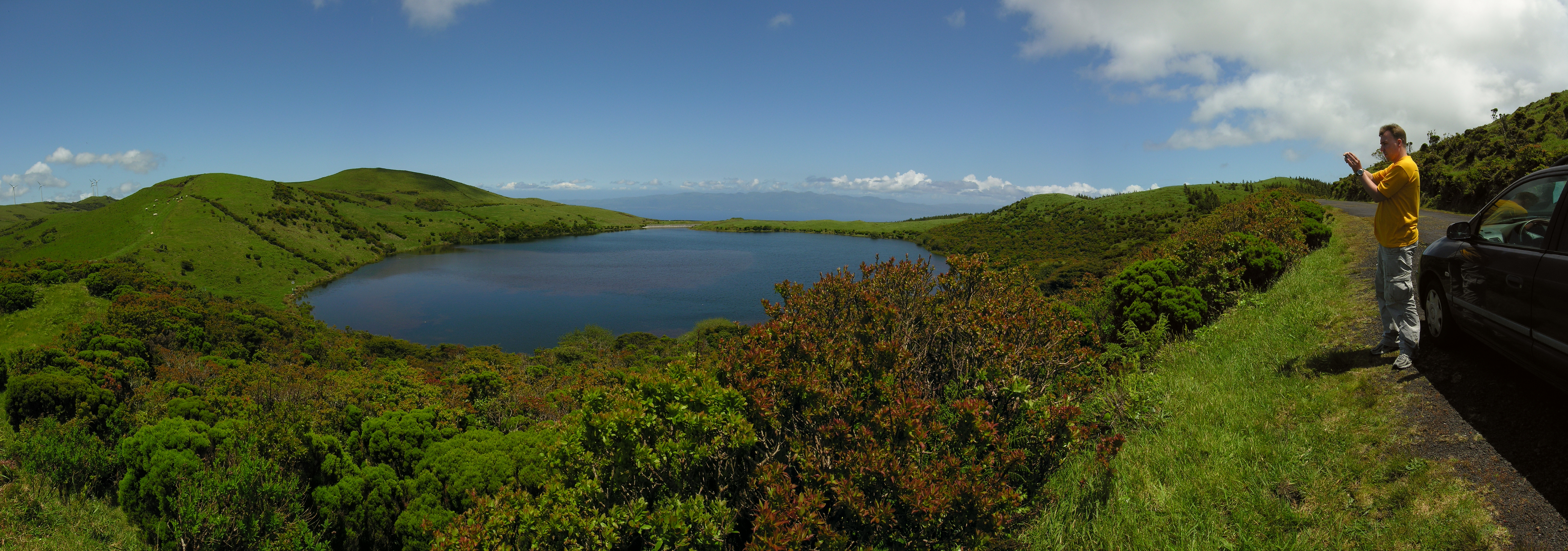
- The lagoon on a clear day

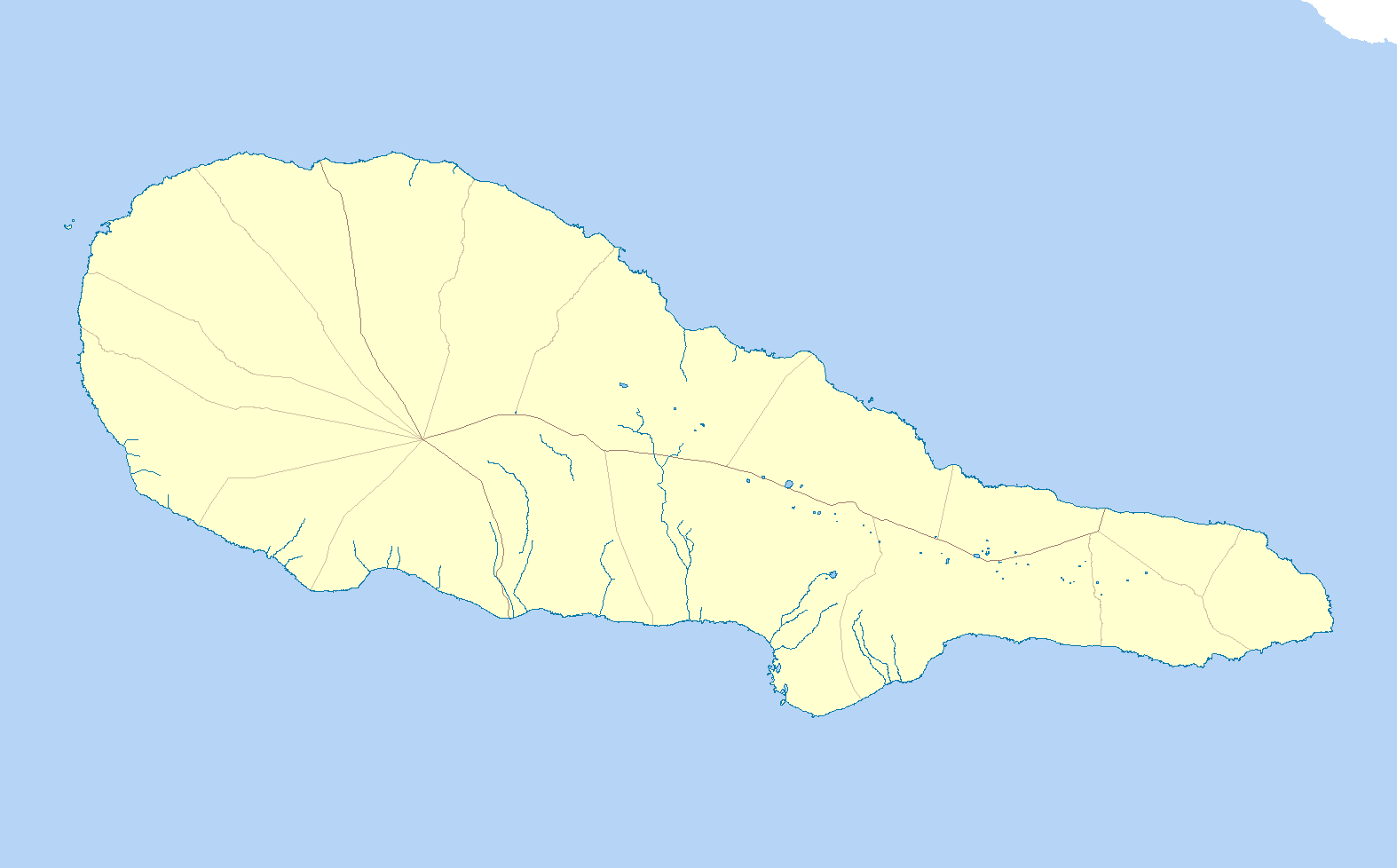
- Location within Pico
- Location: São Roque do Pico, Pico Island, Azores, Portugal
- Coordinates: 38°27′23″N 28°15′02″W
- Catchment area: 0.188 km^{2} (0.073 sq mi)
- Basin countries: (Azores) (Portugal)
- Max. length: 310 m (1,020 ft)
- Max. width: 245 m (804 ft)
- Surface area: 0.055 km^{2} (0.021 sq mi)
- Surface elevation: 821.8 m (2,696 ft)

Lagoa do Caiado is the largest lake on Pico Island, Azores. The high-altitude lake is located on the Achada Plateau, an extensive volcanic mountain range covering most of the central area of the island. The waters are clear and are used for public supply since 1993.

Sitting at around 822 m (2,697 ft) in altitude, in a cinder cone dominated landscape, the area around the lake is densely vegetated due to the extreme humidity it gets (around 4,698 mm (185.0 in) of precipitation each year). Unlike the rest of the Azores, which have been subject to introduction of exotic species, most of the plant life around the lake is endemic to the archipelago (Juniperus brevifolia, Picconia azorica, Erica azorica, Vaccinium cylindraceum). It is one of the best spots for birdwatching in the island, most commonly found are the Eurasian woodcock, the common snipe, the Eurasian teal, the grey heron, the wagtails and the Azores chaffinch.

The lake is located within the Partial Natural Forest Reserve of Lagoa do Caiado; the Special Conservation Zone of Mount Pico, Prainha and Caveiro; the Special Protection Zone of the Central Zone of Pico; and the Geopark of the Achada Plateau.

== Climate ==
Climate data for Lagoa do Caiado, altitude: 750 m (2,460 ft), 1978-2001
Month	Jan	Feb	Mar	Apr	May	Jun	Jul	Aug	Sep	Oct	Nov	Dec	Year
Average precipitation mm (inches)	588.3 (23.16)	531.6 (20.93)	365.5 (14.39)	367.7 (14.48)	328.7 (12.94)	245.0 (9.65)	180.8 (7.12)	186.3 (7.33)	286.8 (11.29)	407.6 (16.05)	473.8 (18.65)	679.8 (26.76)	4,641.9 (182.75)
Source: Portuguese Environment Agency
