= Saudades da Terra =

Manuscript by Gaspar Frutuoso

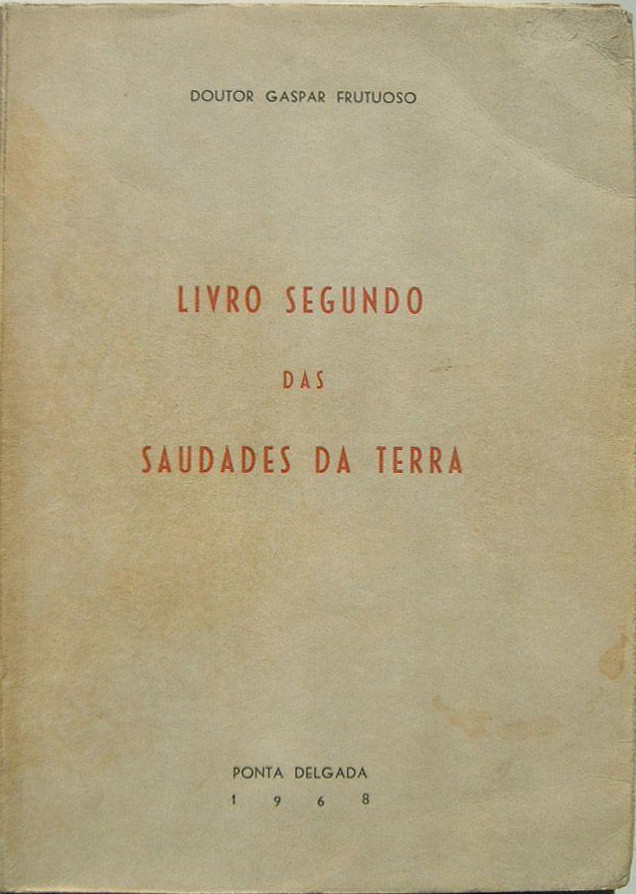
Book II of Saudades da Terra dedicated to Madeira (1968 edition)

Saudades da Terra is a book written between 1586 and 1590 by the Portuguese priest Gaspar Frutuoso, providing a detailed description of the Macaronesia region, especially the Azores, Madeira and the Canary Islands.

It represents the most important pre-17th century repository of information on the geography, history, clothing, genealogy, toponymy, and fauna and flora of the region. The author writes from the perspective of a typical Renaissance humanist, with a broad coverage of literary, artistic and musical fields, observed natural phenomena, alchemical experimentation and speculations on geology, biology, mineralogy and petrography.

== Structure ==
The work is divided in six books, five of them featuring one or more islands of the Azores, and one of them being a poem:

- Book I – Cape Verde and the Canary Islands
- Book II – Madeira
- Book III – Azores: Santa Maria
- Book IV – Azores: São Miguel;
- Book V – Poem – a fictional story in which a character named "Truth" narrates to a character named "Fame" the story of two friends forced to live far away from home.
- Book VI – Azores: Terceira, Faial, Pico, Flores, Graciosa and São Jorge.

The work is then complemented by another volume, titled Saudades do Céu, a philosophical-theological dissertation regarding the Portuguese succession crisis of 1580.

== Background ==
Gaspar Frutuoso did not publish his work even though the quality of the manuscript suggests that he did intend to do that. The reason for that is unknown, but it may be related to the Spanish rule over Portugal during the Philippine Dynasty. Instead, he added the manuscript to a library in the Jesuit College in Ponta Delgada, where it remained until 1760, when the expulsion of Jesuits from Portugal.

In 1922, when the 300 years birth anniversary of Gaspar Frutuoso was being celebrated, the manuscript was owned by Praia e Monforte family, who restricted access to the work, thus preventing its full publication. Later on, it was donated to the local government of Ponta Delgada and added to the "Biblioteca Pública e Arquivo de Ponta Delgada", where it remains today.

== See also ==
- History of the Azores
- History of Madeira
- History of the Canary Islands
- History of Cape Verde
