= Achada Plateau =

Volcanic mountain range on Pico Island, Azores, Portugal

Achada Plateau Planalto da Achada
- Volcanic fissure
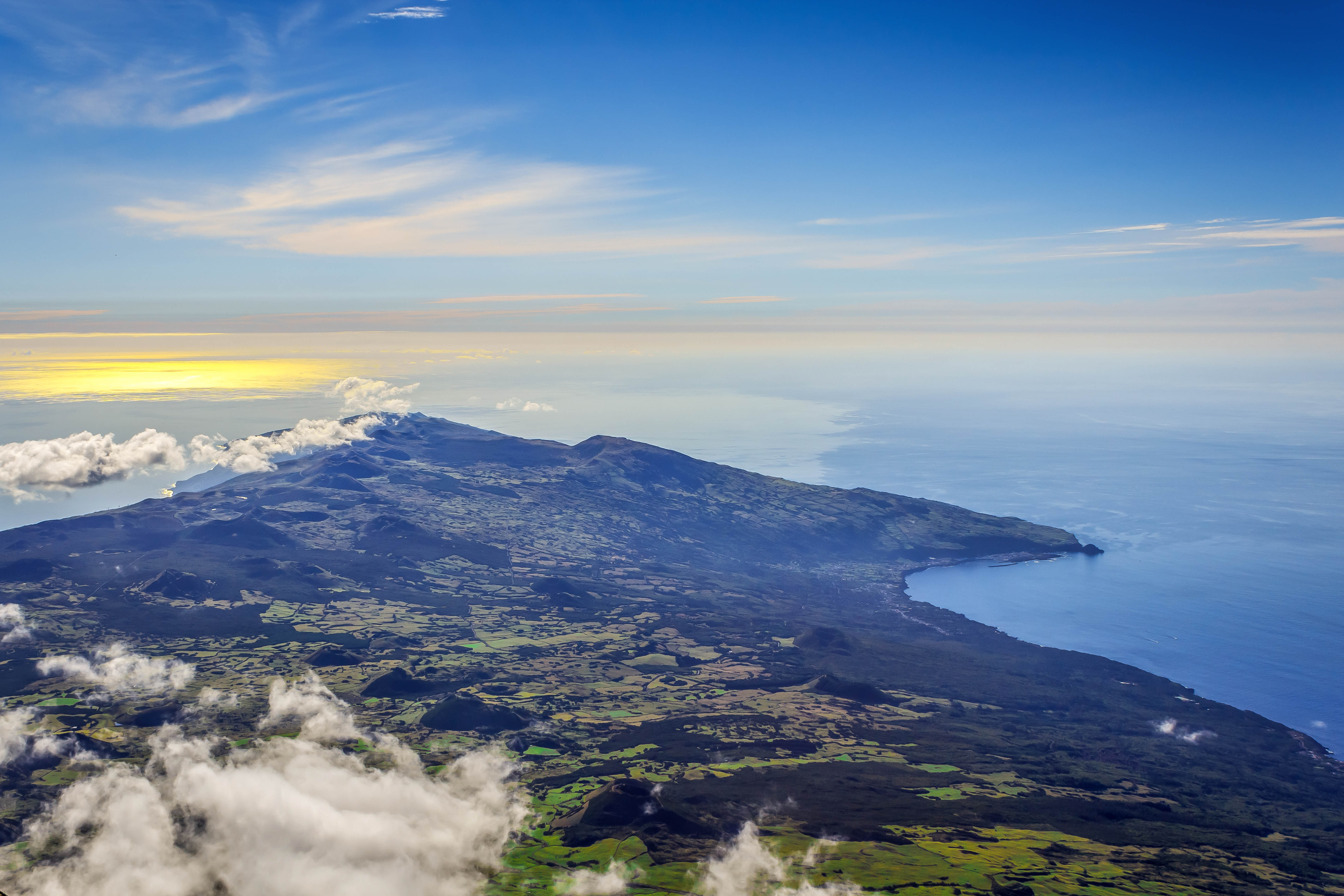
- View of the plateau (left side) and the Topo Volcano (centered) from Mount Pico
- Interactive map of Achada Plateau
- Coordinates: 38°27′32″N 28°16′34″W
- Range: Mid-Atlantic Ridge

Dimensions
  - Length: 30 km (19 mi)
- Highest elevation: Caveiro (1,072 m (3,517 ft))
- Last eruption: 1720 (Mistério da Silveira)

Ramsar Wetland
- Official name: Planalto Central do Pico (Achada)
- Designated: 16 June 2008
- Reference no.: 1807

The Achada Plateau (Portuguese: Planalto da Achada) is an extensive volcanic mountain range located on Pico Island, Azores. It is a protected area with many valuable features that characterize the Azorean landscape. It is included in two Natura 2000 sites, one of which is classified as an Important Bird Area. Part of the plateau also includes a ramsar wetland. It is one of the three main geomorphological units that comprise Pico Island.

== Location and geomorphology ==
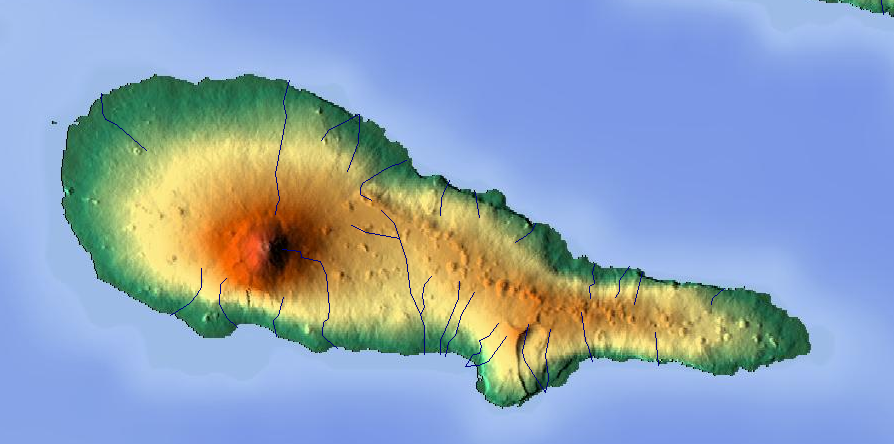
Location of the plateau, east of Mount Pico

The Achada Plateau is located on the highlands of Pico, the highest and second largest island on the archipelago of the Azores. The extensive volcanic mountain range, located in the eastern half of the island at a mean altitude of 750 m (2,460 ft), stretches 30 km (19 mi) from Lagoa do Capitão (northeast of Mount Pico) to the easternmost part of the island. It is characterized by the steep slopes that limit it to the south and north and by the presence in the axial zone of the range of various volcano-tectonic alignments of cinder and spatter cones and eruptive fissures (typical of a basaltic fissural volcanism).

The volcanic cones, totaling around 190, have very varied dimensions and shapes, usually with associated ʻaʻā-type drains, which flowed towards the coast. Some cones show craters (sometimes occupied by small ponds) that are multiple, elongated or have several eruptive mouths, which reflect the associated tectonics.

== Biome ==
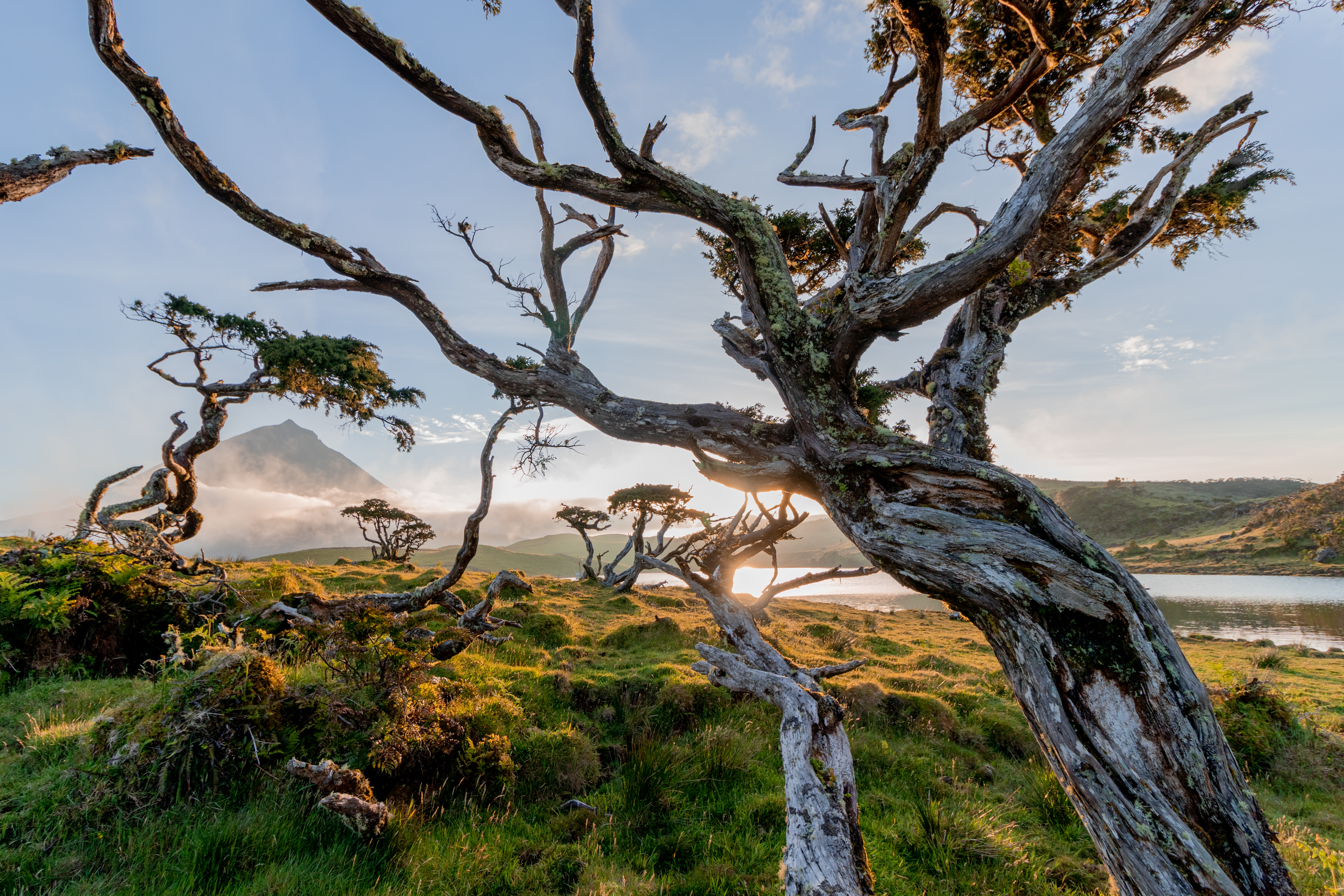
Landscape of the plateau

The Achada Plateau is one of the most valuable natural sites on the Azores. It hosts one of the last intact remnants of the original temperate mixed forests that covered the archipelago before the arrival of humans and the following deforestation and introduction of exotic species. It is listed as an Important Bird Area, several birds species make home in the peat bogs, ponds and lakes of the formation.

Part of the central plateau was designated a Ramsar wetland in 2008 due to its ecological importance. Bodies of water include: Lagoa dos Grotões, Lagoa da Rosada, Lagoa do Paul, Lagoa do Landroal, Lagoa do Caiado, Lagoa do Peixinho and Lagoa Negra.

The plateau is part of two Natura 2000 sites: The Special Conservation Zone of Mount Pico, Prainha and Caveiro; and the Special Protection Zone of the Central Zone of Pico.

=== Climate ===
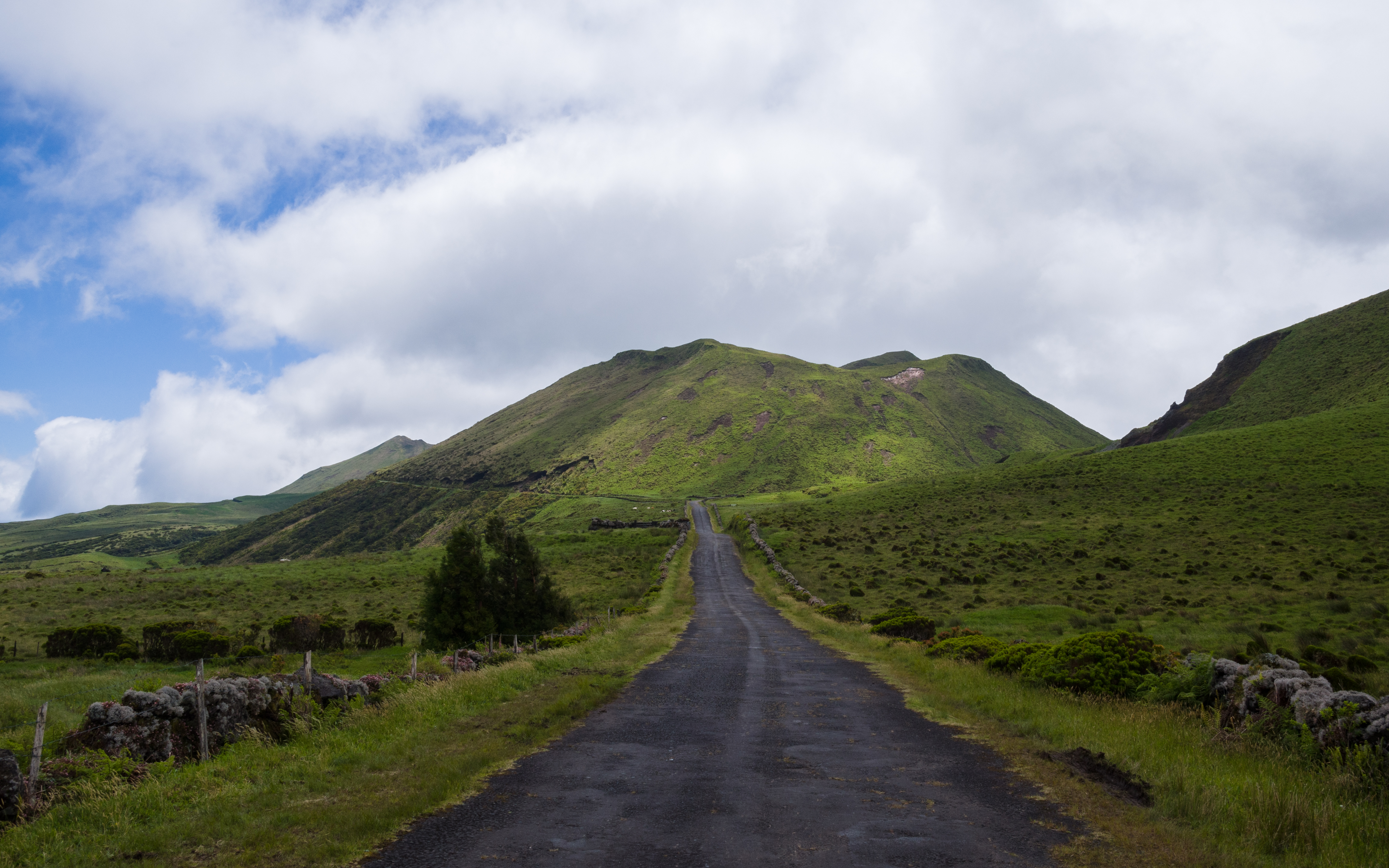
Road and cinder cone (Cabeço dos Grotões)

Due to its altitude, the plateau has a significantly different climate when compared to the rest of the island. According to Köppen, Achada has an oceanic climate, with cool to warm summers and chilly to cool winters. In the warmest month – August – temperatures vary between 19–20 °C (66–68 °F) at day to 12–13 °C (54–55 °F) at night and in the coolest month – January – from 10–11 °C (50–52 °F) at day to 6–7 °C (43–45 °F) at night.

The area is subject to intense orographic lift which makes precipitation thoroughly abundant, humidity high (around 90%) and cloudiness persistent. It gets between 3,000 and 5,000 mm (120 and 200 in) of precipitation per year, making it the rainiest area in the Atlantic Ocean (though most of the precipitation is actually from drizzle). There is a noticeably drier season in the summer, influence of its proximity to the Mediterranean Basin.

=== Flora ===
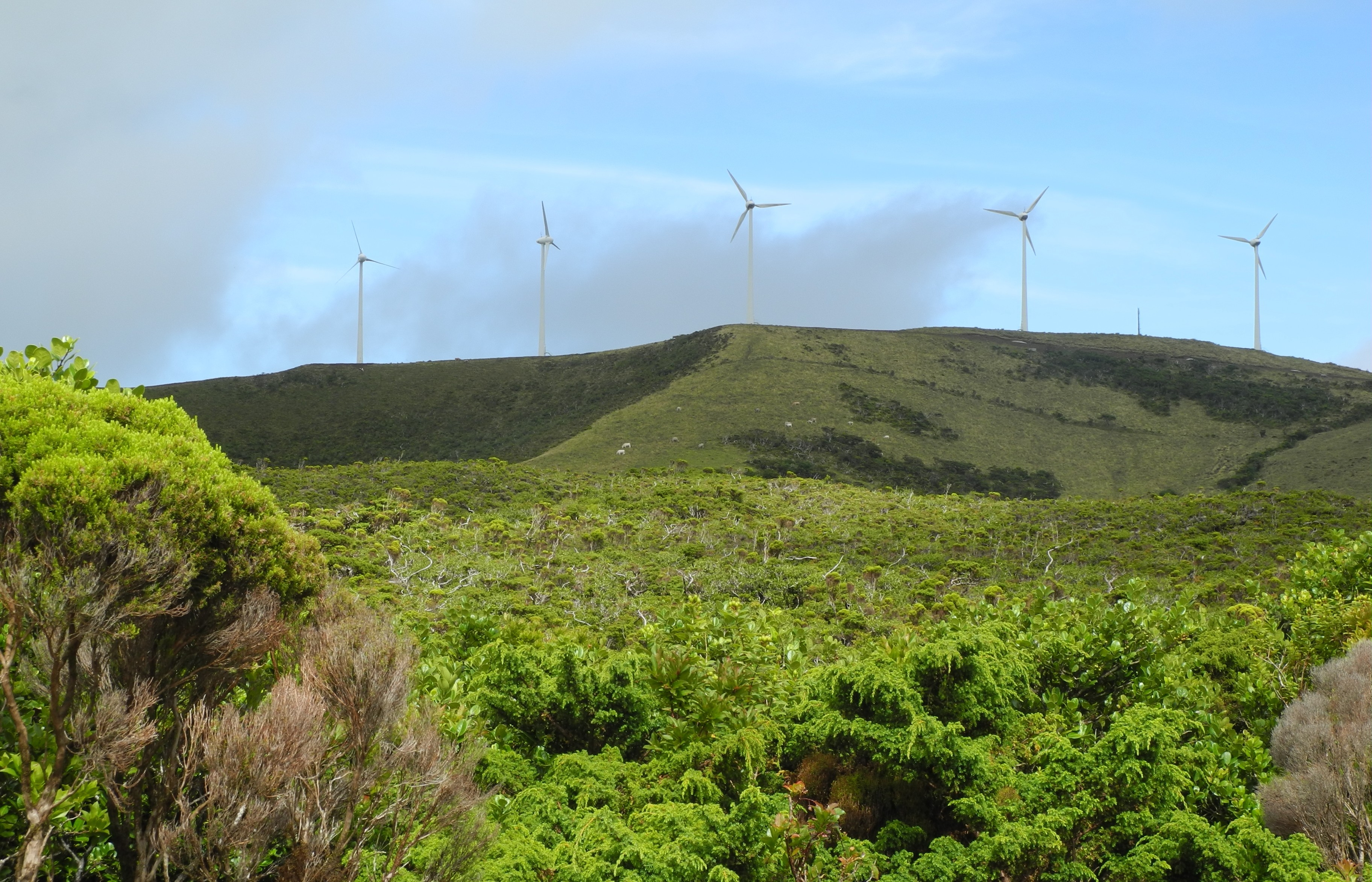
Native Macaronesian vegetation

The plateau is characterized by two types of landscapes:

- Pasture, used by cattle and characterized by the lack of woody plants and a predominance of native grasses and peat moss.
- Native laurisilva cloud forests with many Azorean endemics such as Juniperus brevifolia, Erica azorica, Viburnum treleasei, Euphorbia stygiana, Vaccinium cylindraceum, Laurus azorica, Ilex perado, among others.

=== Birds ===
The plateau is also an important area for many resident and migratory bird species, especially the Azores wood pigeon. Most commonly found are the Azores chaffinch, the common snipe, the Eurasian teal, the American wigeon, the ring-necked duck, the mallard, the American black duck, the snow bunting, the grey heron, the grey wagtail, the common buzzard, the Atlantic gull, the wagtails and the Eurasian woodcock. Less frequent specimens include the Western Azores goldcrest, the Eurasian wigeon, the Eurasian blackcap, the European robin, the Azores blackbird, and the Atlantic canary. Rare specimens include the northern pintail, the American bittern, the blue-winged teal, the American coot, the tufted duck, the Wilson's snipe, among others.

== Gallery ==
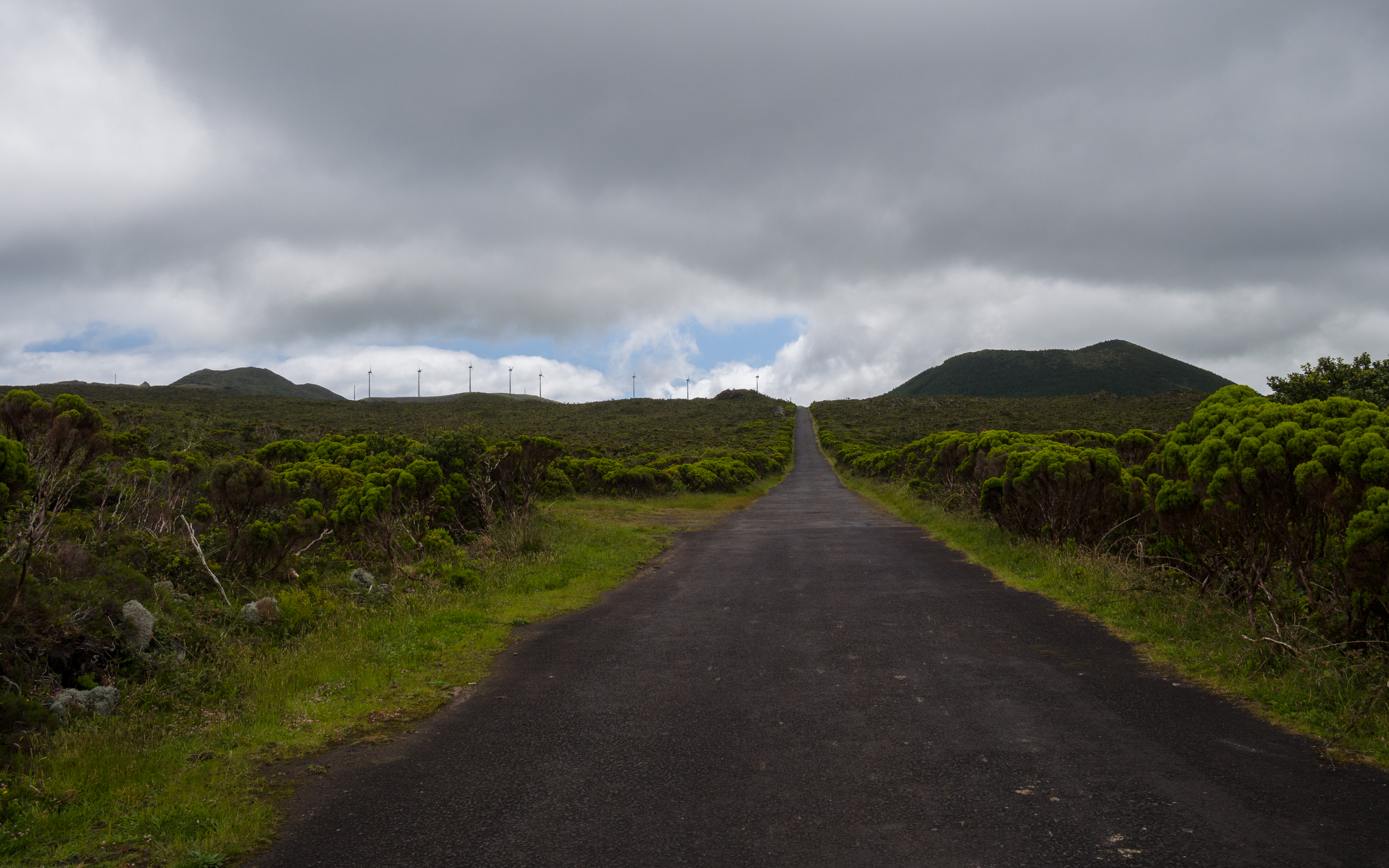

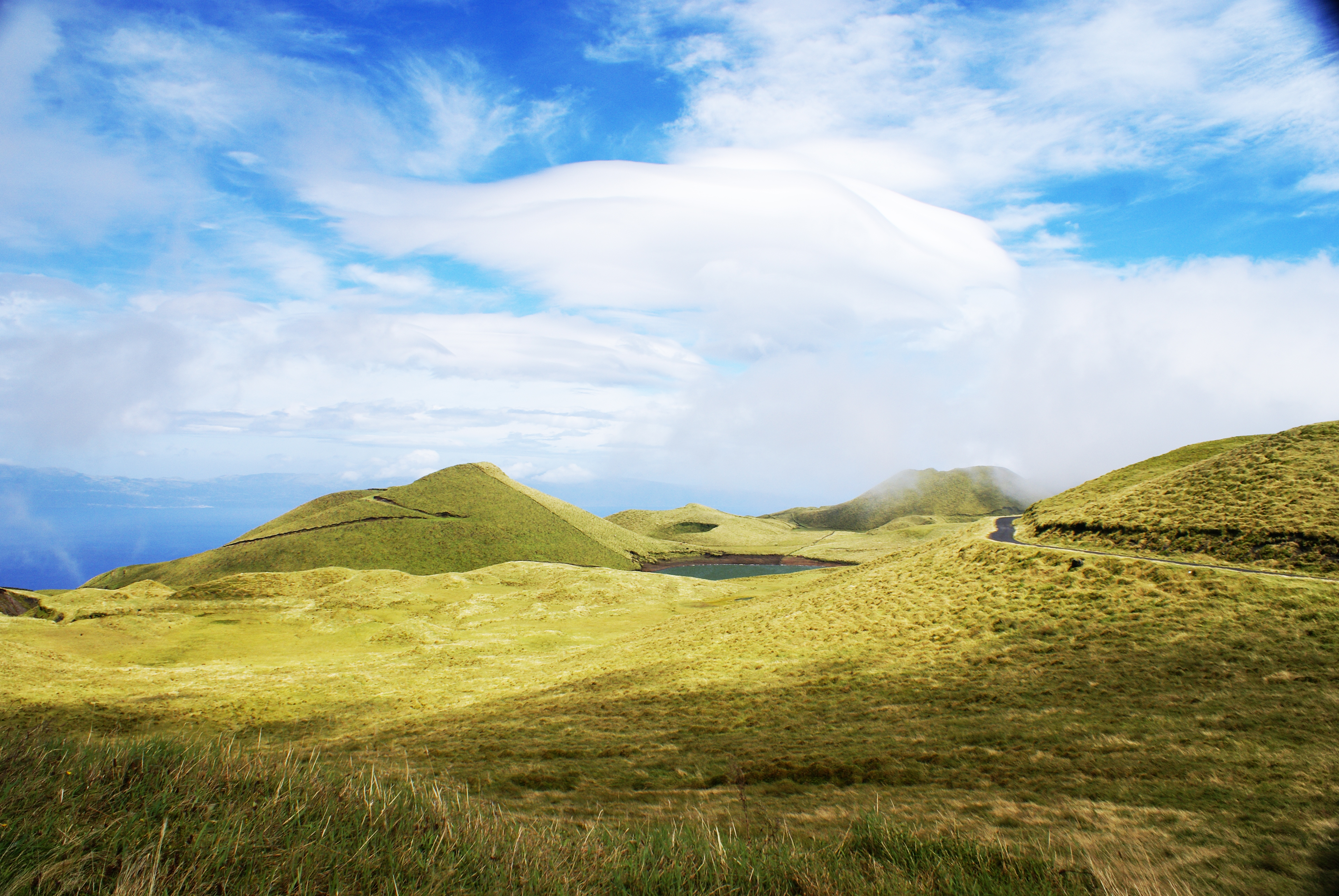

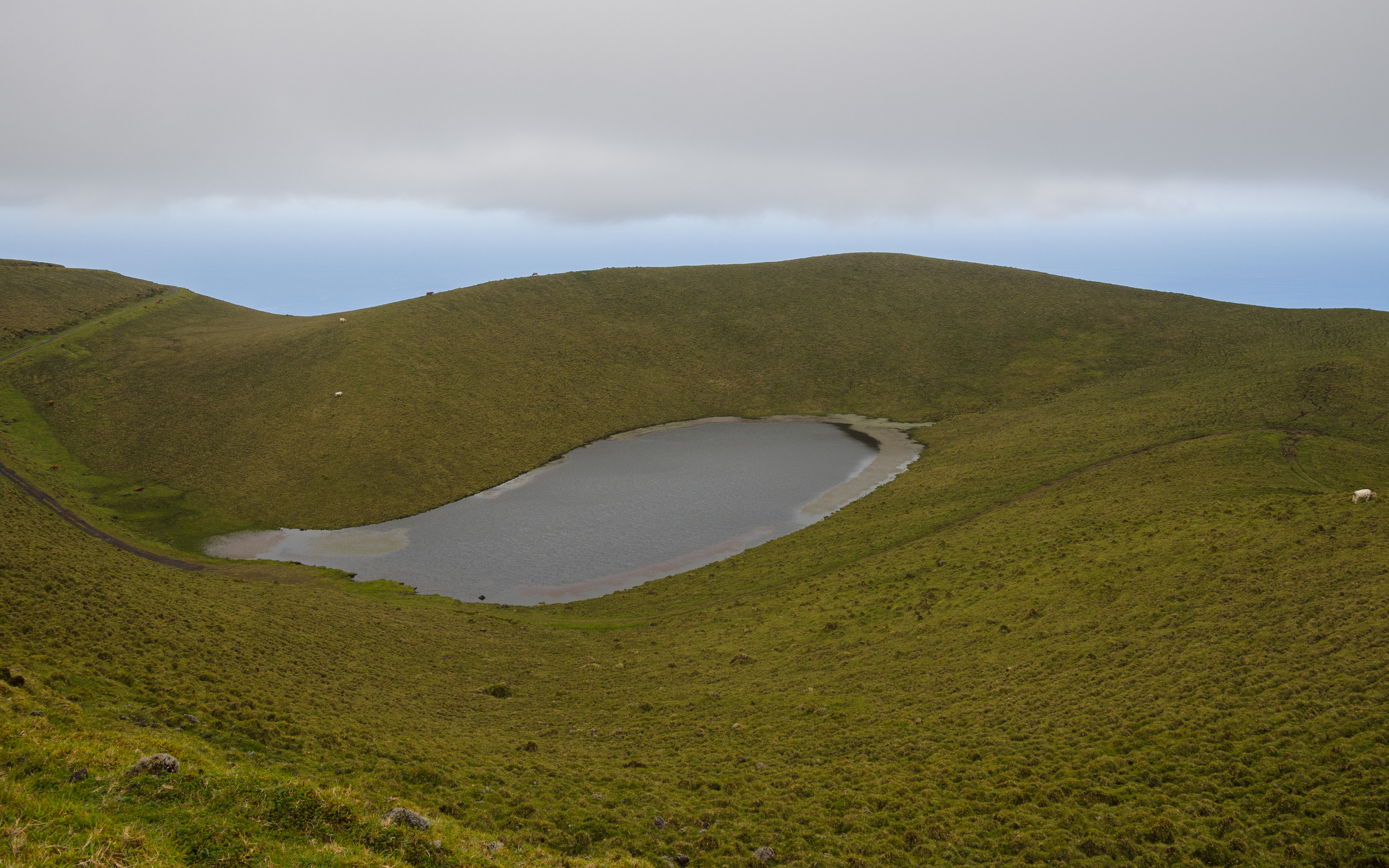

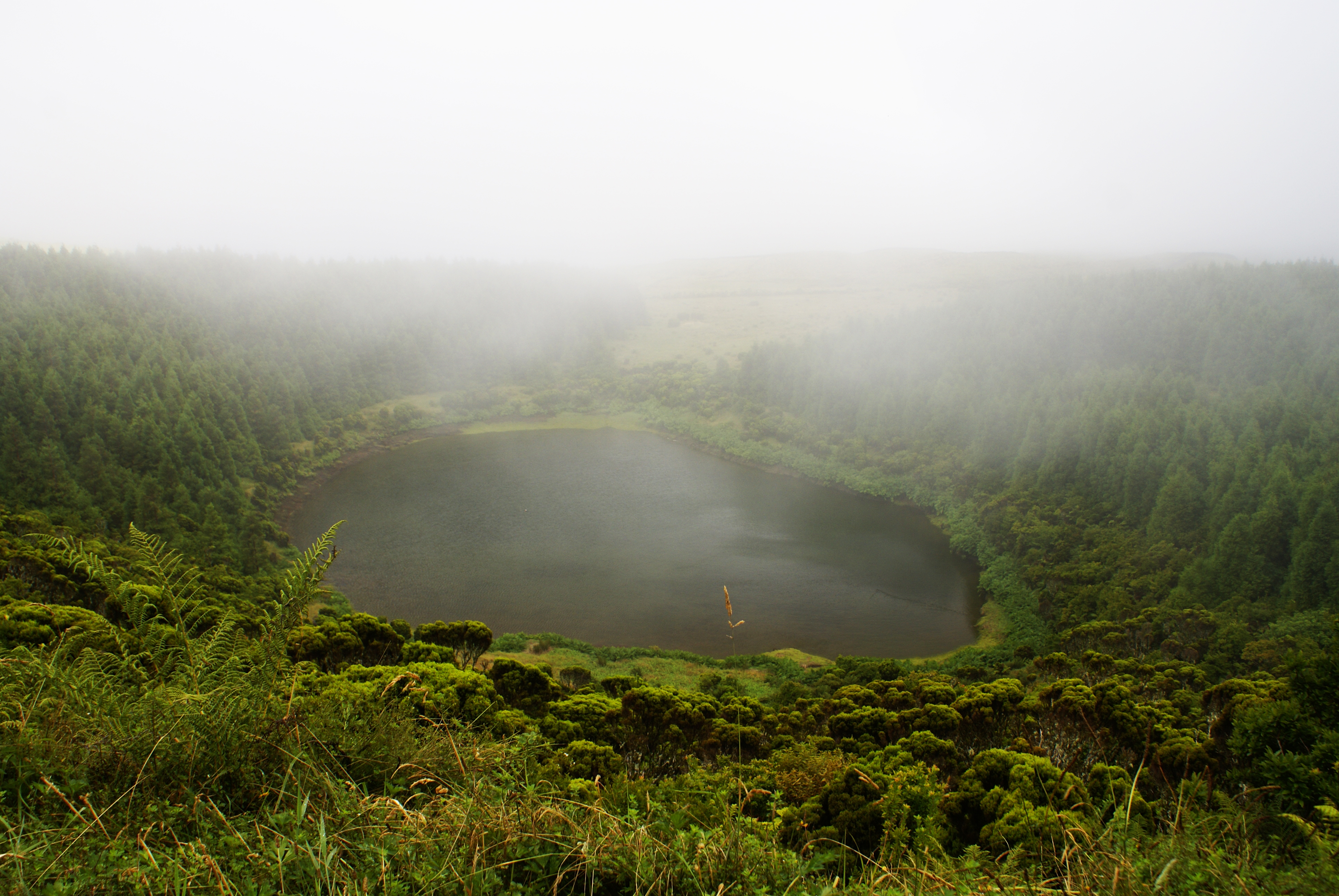
