= List of endemic plants of the Azores =

The Azores are a group of islands in the North Atlantic Ocean, west of the Iberian Peninsula. They are home to dozens of endemic species and subspecies of vascular plants. Although the Azores are politically part of Portugal, the World Geographical Scheme for Recording Plant Distributions treats the Azores as a distinct botanical country. The archipelago are part of Macaronesia, a biogeographical region which also includes the Canary Islands, Cape Verde Islands, Madeira, and the Selvagens.

Plants are listed alphabetically by plant family. Extinct and presumed extinct species are indicated with †.

== Apiaceae ==
- Ammi seubertianum (H.C.Watson) Trel.
- Ammi trifoliatum (H.C.Watson) Trel.
- Angelica lignescens Reduron & Danton – Faial
- Chaerophyllum azoricum Trel.
- Daucus carota subsp. azoricus Franco
- Sanicula azorica Guthnick ex Seub.

== Aquifoliaceae ==
- Ilex perado subsp. azorica (Loes.) Tutin

== Araliaceae ==
- Hedera azorica Carrière

== Aspleniaceae ==
- Asplenium azoricum Lovis, Rasbach, K.Rasbach & Reichst.
- Asplenium × diasii H.Schaef., Rumsey & Rasbach (A. azoricum × A. onopteris)
- Asplenium × santamariae H.Schaef., Rumsey & Rasbach (A. azoricum × A. scolopendrium)
- Asplenium × vogelii Rumsey, Hendy & K.E.Jones (A. azoricum × A. trichomanes subsp. quadrivalens)

== Asteraceae ==
- Bellis azorica Seub.
- Lactuca watsoniana Trel.
- Leontodon × carreiroi (Gand.) M.Moura & L.Silva (L. rigens × L. saxatilis) – São Miguel
- Leontodon filii (Hochst. ex Seub.) Paiva & Ormonde – central Azores
- Leontodon × friasi M.Moura & Silva (L. hochstetteri × L. saxatilis) – Flores
- Leontodon hochstetteri M.Moura & Silva – western Azores
- Leontodon rigens (Aiton) Paiva & Ormonde – São Miguel
- Pericallis malvifolia (L'Hér.) B.Nord.
  - Pericallis malvifolia subsp. caldeirae H.Schaef. – Faial
  - Pericallis malvifolia subsp. malvifolia
- Taraxacum perssonii Plaglund ex Sahlin & Soest
- Taraxacum pseudolandmarkii Franco & Rocha Afonso
- Tolpis azorica (Nutt.) P.Silva

== Boraginaceae ==
- Myosotis azorica H.C.Watson
- Myosotis maritima Hochst. ex Seub.

== Brassicaceae ==
- Cardamine caldeirarum Guthnick ex Seub.

== Campanulaceae ==
- Azorina vidalii H.C.Watson

== Caprifoliaceae ==
- Scabiosa nitens Roem. & Schult.

== Caryophyllaceae ==
- Cerastium azoricum Hochst. ex Seub.
- Cerastium vagans var. ciliatum Tutin & E.F.Warb.
- Spergularia azorica (Kindb.) Lebel

== Crassulaceae ==
- Aichryson santamariensis M.Moura, Carine & M.Seq. – Santa Maria

== Cupressaceae ==
- Juniperus brevifolia (Seub.) Antoine
  - Juniperus brevifolia subsp. brevifolia
  - Juniperus brevifolia subsp. maritima R.B.Elias & E.Días
  - Juniperus brevifolia var. montana R.B.Elias & E.Días

== Cyperaceae ==
- Carex demissa subsp. cedercreutzii (Fagerstr.) Jac.Koopman
- Carex hochstetteriana J.Gay ex Seub.
- Carex laevicaulis Hochst. ex Seub.
- Carex leviosa Míguez, Jim.Mejías, H.Schaef. & Martín-Bravo
- Carex pilulifera subsp. azorica (J.Gay) Franco & Rocha Afonso
- Carex vulcani Hochst. ex Seub.

== Ericaceae ==
- Daboecia azorica Tutin & E.F.Warb.
- Erica azorica Hochst. ex Seub.
- Vaccinium cylindraceum Sm.

== Euphorbiaceae ==
- Euphorbia azorica Hochst. in M.A.Seubert
- Euphorbia santamariae (H.Schaef.) H.Schaef.
- Euphorbia stygiana H.C.Watson

== Fabaceae ==
- † Vicia dennesiana H.C.Watson – eastern São Miguel: Serra da Tronqueira

== Gentianaceae ==
- Centaurium scilloides (L.f.) Samp.

== Hypericaceae ==
- Hypericum foliosum Aiton

== Isoetaceae ==
- Isoetes azorica Durieu

== Juncaceae ==
- Luzula purpureosplendens Seub.

== Lauraceae ==
- Laurus azorica (Seub.) Franco

== Oleaceae ==
- Picconia azorica (Tutin) Knobl.

== Orchidaceae ==
- Platanthera azorica Schltr. – São Jorge and Faial
- Platanthera micrantha (Hochst. ex Seub.) Schltr.
- Platanthera pollostantha R.M.Bateman & M.Moura

== Orobanchaceae ==
- Euphrasia azorica H.C.Watson
- Euphrasia grandiflora Hochst.

== Plantaginaceae ==
- Veronica dabneyi Hochst. ex Seub.

== Plumbaginaceae ==
- Armeria maritima subsp. azorica Franco – Flores, São Jorge, and São Miguel
- Limonium eduardi-diasii H.Schaef.

== Poaceae ==
- Agrostis congestiflora Tutin & E.F.Warb.
  - Agrostis congestiflora subsp. congestiflora – Azores (0 - 500 m)
  - Agrostis congestiflora subsp. oreophila Franco – Azores (600 - 2340 m)
- Agrostis gracililaxa Franco
  - Agrostis gracililaxa var. gracililaxa – Azores (250 - 500 m)
  - Agrostis gracililaxa var. mutica Franco – Terceira
- Agrostis reuteri subsp. botelhoi Rocha Afonso & Franco
- Avenella foliosa (Hack.) Rivas Mart., Lousã, Fern.Prieto, E.Días, J.C.Costa
- Festuca francoi Fern.Prieto, C.Aguiar, E.Días & M.I.Gut.
- Festuca petraea Guthnick ex Seub.
- Gaudinia coarctata (Link) T.Durand & Schinz
- Holcus × azoricus M.Seq. & Castrov. (H. lanatus × H. rigidus)
- Holcus rigidus Hochst.
- Rostraria azorica S.Hend., Bot. J. Linn – Santa Maria

== Polygonaceae ==
- Rumex azoricus Rech.f.

== Polypodiaceae ==
- Dryopteris crispifolia Rasbach, Reichst. & G.Vida
- Dryopteris intermedia subsp. azorica (Christ) Jermy
- Dryopteris × madalenae Fraser-Jenk. (D. crispifolia × D. intermedia subsp. azorica) – Pico
- Dryopteris × martinsiae Fraser-Jenk. (D. aemula × D. crispifolia) – Pico
- Dryopteris × picoensis Fraser-Jenk. & Gibby (D. affinis × D. intermedia subsp. azorica) – Pico
- Dryopteris × sjoegrenii Fraser-Jenk. (D. dilatata × D. intermedia subsp. azorica) – Pico
- Dryopteris × telesii Fraser-Jenk. (D. crispifolia × D. dilatata) – Pico
- Grammitis azorica (H.Schaef.) H.Schaef. – Flores

== Primulaceae ==
- Lysimachia azorica Hook.

== Rosaceae ==
- Prunus lusitanica subsp. azorica (Mouill.) Franco
- Rubus hochstetterorum Seub.

== Rubiaceae ==
- Rubia agostinhoi Dans. & P.Silva

== Santalaceae ==
- Arceuthobium azoricum Wiens & Hawksw. – Parasitic on Juniperus brevifolia

== Smilacaceae ==
- Smilax azorica H.Schaef. & P.Schönfelder

== Viburnaceae ==
- Viburnum treleasei Gand.
