= Azores temperate mixed forests =

Ecoregion of southwestern Europe

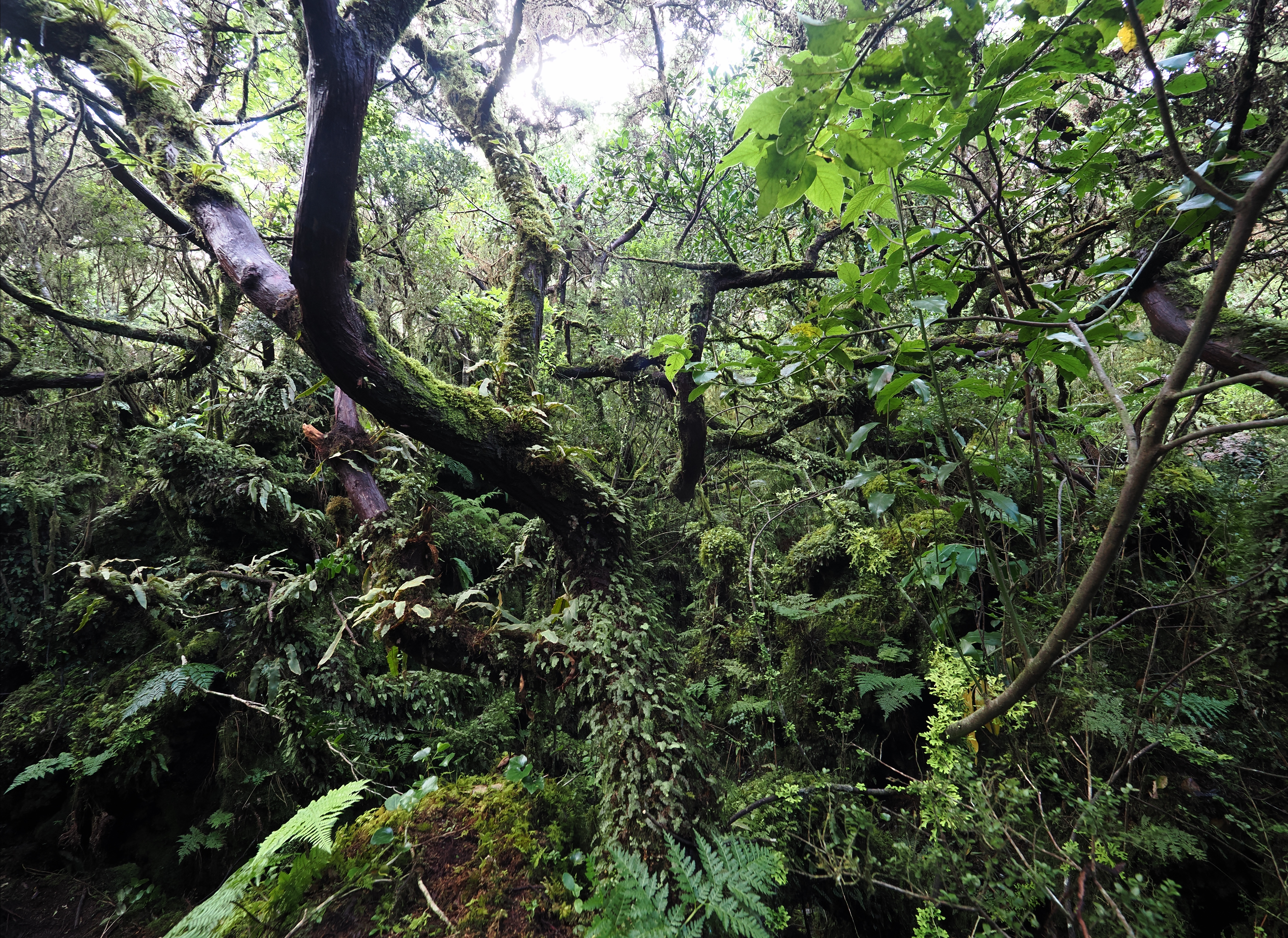
- Mistérios Negros, Terceira Island

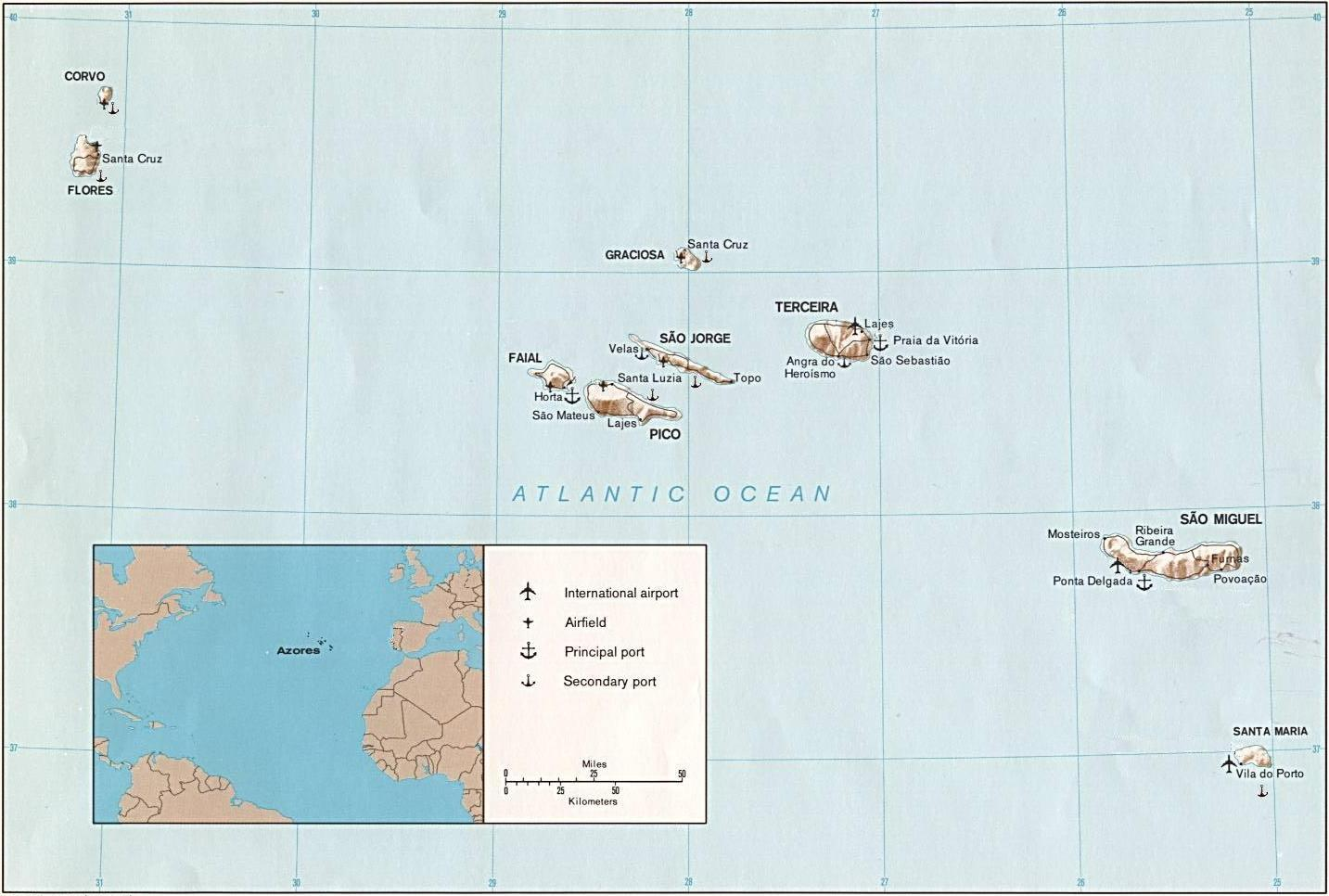
- Map of the Azores

Ecology
- Realm: Palearctic
- Biome: temperate broadleaf and mixed forests

Geography
- Area: 2,431 km^{2} (939 mi^{2})
- Country: Portugal
- Autonomous region of Portugal: Azores
- Coordinates: 38º30' N, 28º00' W

Conservation
- Conservation status: critical/endangered
- Protected: 620 km^{2} (26%)

The Azores temperate mixed forests is a temperate broadleaf and mixed forests ecoregion of southwestern Europe. It encompasses the Azores archipelago in the Atlantic Ocean. These volcanic islands are an autonomous region of Portugal, and lie 1500 km west of the Portuguese mainland.

== Geography ==
The Azores archipelago consists of nine main islands. The islands extend for more than 600 km (370 mi) in a northwest–southeast direction. The islands form three clusters. Flores and Corvo are to west; Graciosa, Terceira, São Jorge, Pico, and Faial are in the centre; and São Miguel, Santa Maria, and the Formigas islets are to the east. São Miguel is the largest of the islands, and most populous.

The islands arise steeply from the sea. Mount Pico (2,351 m) on Pico is the highest peak in the Azores.

== Climate ==
The islands have a temperate maritime climate, moderated by the Gulf Stream. Frosts don't occur below 500 meters elevation. The average temperature is 21 °C (70 °F) in the summer months, and 14.5 °C (58 °F) in the winter.

== Flora ==
Little natural vegetation remains in the lowlands. The evergreen fire tree (Myrica faya) regrows on old lowland lava flows.

Above 500 meters elevation there are enclaves of evergreen shrub forest, characterized by the trees Laurus azorica, Juniperus brevifolia, Picconia azorica, and Erica azorica. Shrubs include Azorean holly (Ilex perado subsp. azorica), Viburnum treleasei, and Azores blueberry (Vaccinium cylindraceum), a tall shrub with showy dark-pink flowers. Clethra arborea, a Madeiran native introduced to the islands by humans, has become common in the evergreen forests.

Diverse highland peat bogs are found on the islands of Flores and Terceira.

== Fauna ==
There are 36 species of birds that breed on the islands. The Azores bullfinch or Priolo (Pyrrhula murina) is endemic.

The Azores have three native mammals, all bats – the greater mouse-eared bat (Myotis myotis), the Madeira pipistrelle (Pipistrellus maderensis) and the endemic Azores noctule (Nyctalus azoreum). The islands have no native land mammals.

== Conservation and threats ==
The Azores were discovered and settled by Portuguese mariners in the 15th century. Prior to settlement the islands were mostly covered in forest. The settlers cleared most of the islands' forests for agriculture and pasture. Domesticated cattle, sheep, and goats were introduced to the islands, along with the brown rat (Rattus norvegicus), black rat (R. rattus), Western European house mouse (Mus musculus domesticus), European hedgehog (Erinaceus europaeus), European rabbit (Oryctolagus cuniculus), least weasel (Mustela nivalis), and ferret (M. putorius furo). The introduced herbivores altered the island's ecology through grazing, and the introduced predators preyed on native species, particularly birds and their eggs, which were unadapted to predation.

Exotic plants originally introduced for timber, windbreaks, and garden plants, including Japanese red cedar (Cryptomeria japonica), Australian cheesewood (Pittosporum undulatum), kahili ginger (Hedychium gardnerianum), ice plant (Carpobrotus edulis), Gunnera tinctoria, bigleaf hydrangea (Hydrangea macrophylla) and the Madeiran native Clethra arborea, have spread into wild areas where they displace native plants and alter habitat for native animals. The Azores bullfinch relies on a few native plants for food – Azores blueberry and Azorean hawkbit (Leontodon filii) in August and September, and Azorean holly in March and April. Loss of these food plants contributed to the species' declining population. Between 2003 and 2008 an EU-funded project removed exotic species and replanted native food plants in the Pico da Vara/Ribeira do Guilherme Special Protection Area on São Miguel, and the local Azores bullfinch population subsequently rebounded.

== Protected areas ==
620 km^{2} (26%) of the ecoregion is in protected areas. Another 20% is forested and outside protected areas.
