= Topo Volcano =

Inactive shield volcano on Pico Island, Azores

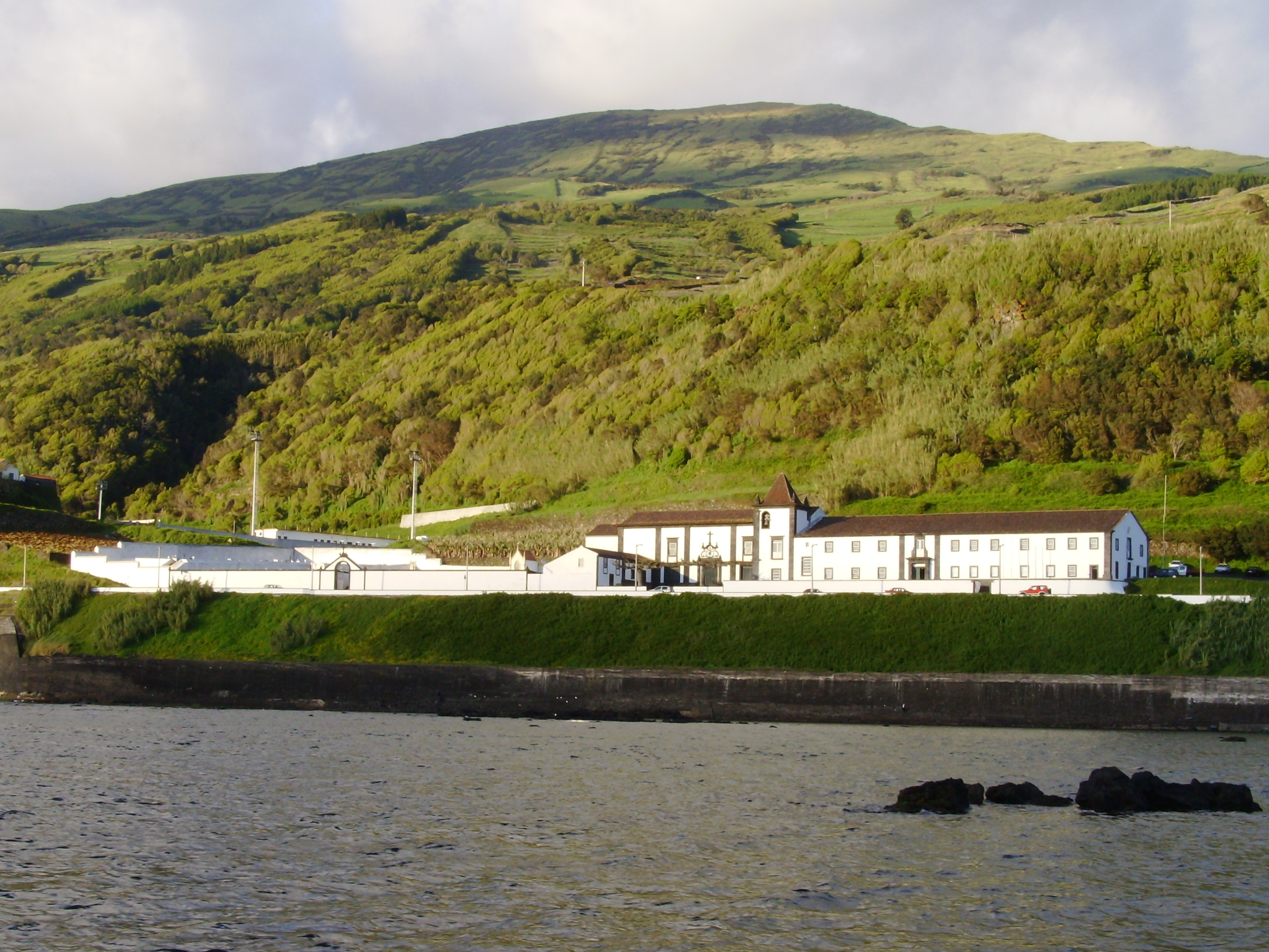
- The volcano, seen northeast of Lajes do Pico

Highest point
- Elevation: 1,002 m (3,287 ft)
- Coordinates: 38°25′21″N 28°13′34″W

Dimensions
- Area: 18 km^{3} (4.3 cu mi) (subaerial)
- Volume: 8 km^{3} (1.9 cu mi) (subaerial)

Geography
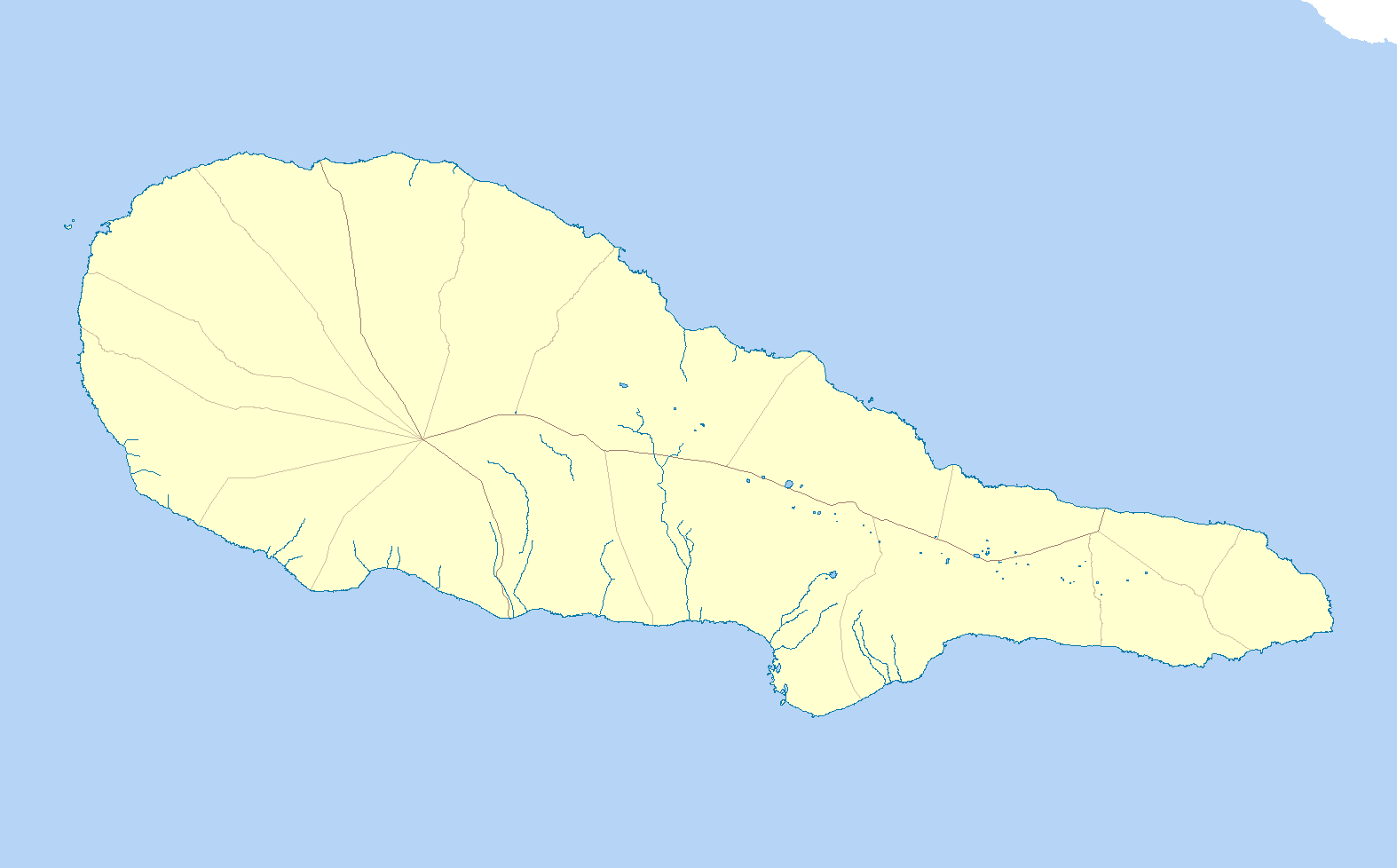
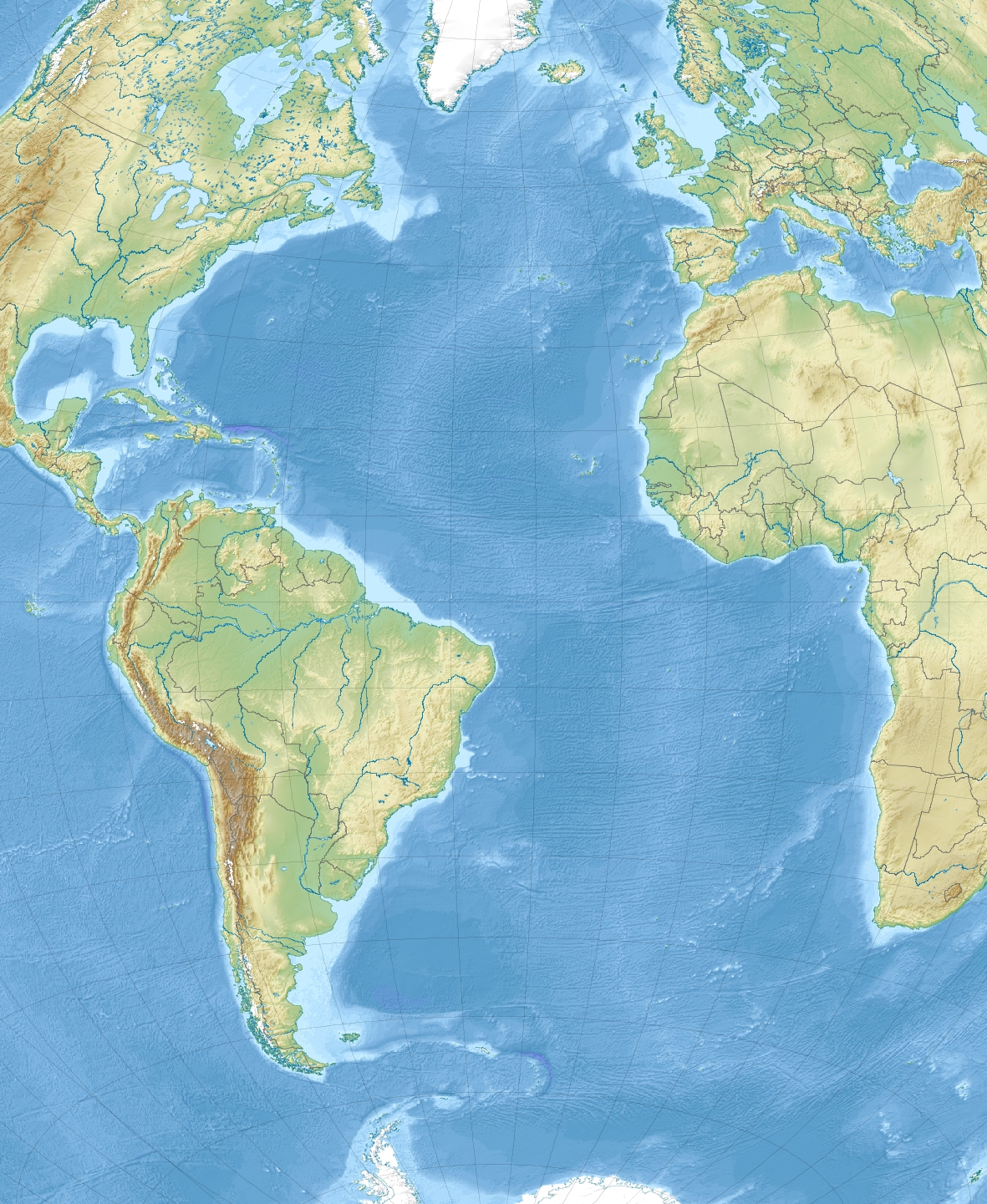
- Location within Pico Location within Azores Location within Atlantic Ocean
- Location: Pico Island, Azores
- Country: Portugal

Geology
- Rock age: 300,000-10,000 years
- Mountain type: Shield volcano
- Rock type: Ankaramite
- Last eruption: 5,000-10,000 years ago

Topo Volcano (Portuguese: Vulcão do Topo) is an inactive shield volcano located on Pico Island, Azores. The volcano measures 1,002 m (3,287 ft) in height and occupies the southernmost area of the island. It is part of the Lajes (or Topo) Volcanic Complex, the oldest volcanic apparatus which gave origin to the island, around 300,000 years ago. The volcano was created by a 600 m (2,000 ft) thick superposition of alternated pāhoehoe lava flows and thin layers (10%) of pyroclastic material.

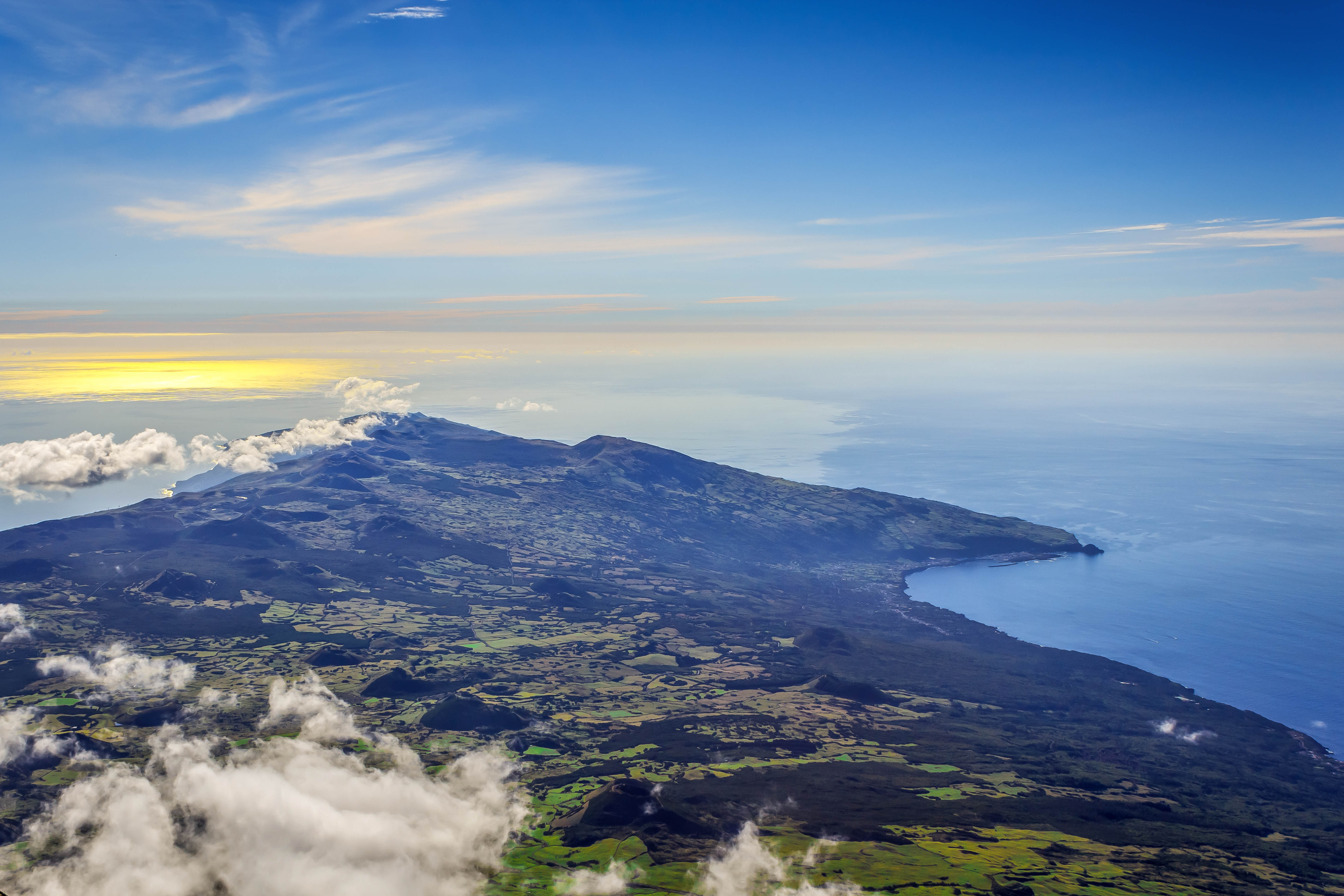
The volcano can be seen in the centre, bordered by its lava delta (forming the Lajes Bay) to the right, and the volcanic complex of the Achada Plateau to the left

Its land area is approximately 18 km^{2} (6.9 sq mi) but its total area, accounting for the sea floor and the area that gave rise to the Achada Plateau, is estimated to be around 120 km^{2} (46 sq mi).
