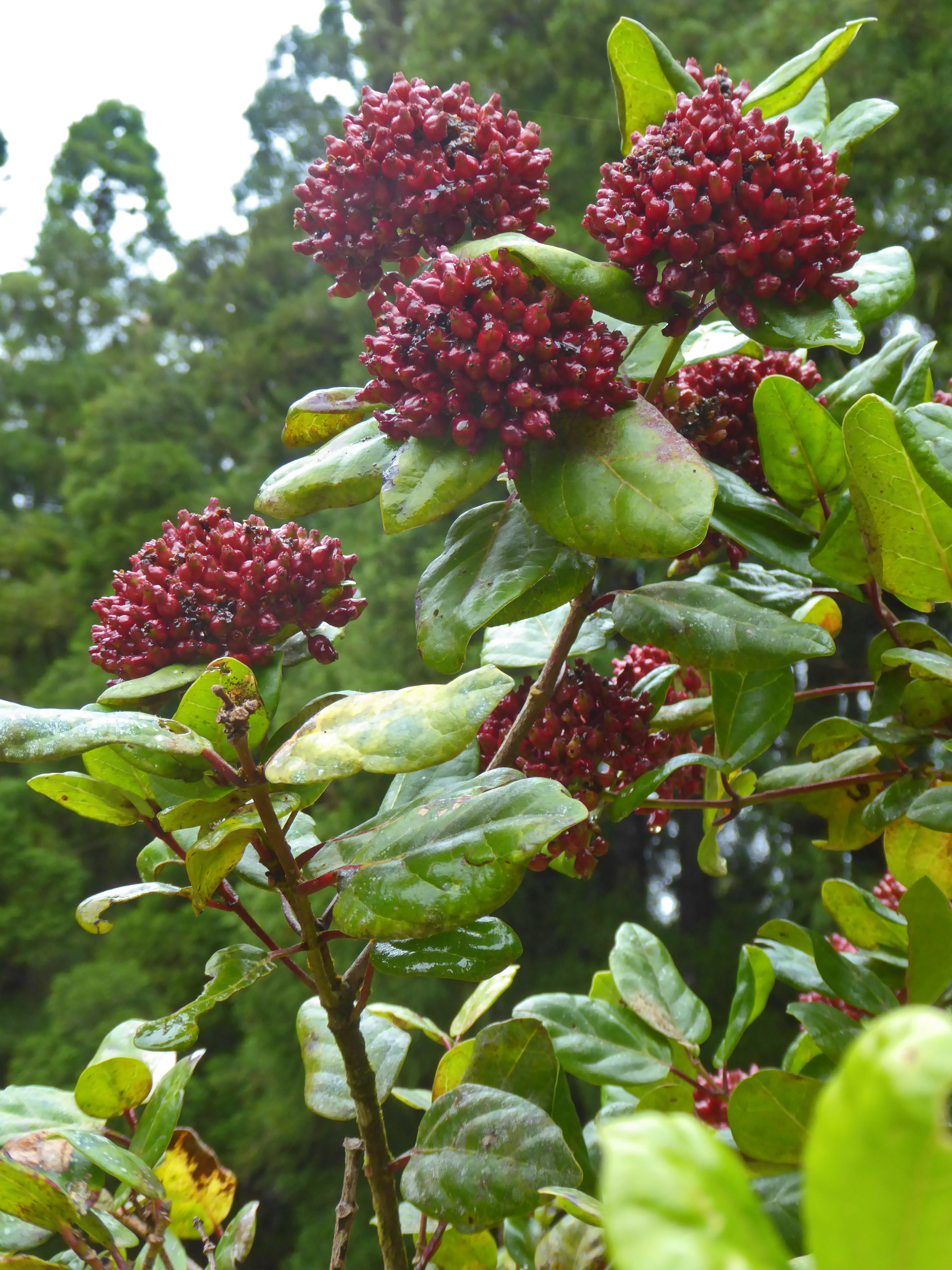

Conservation status
- Least Concern (IUCN 3.1)

Scientific classification
- Kingdom: Plantae
- Clade: Tracheophytes
- Clade: Angiosperms
- Clade: Eudicots
- Clade: Asterids
- Order: Dipsacales
- Family: Adoxaceae
- Genus: Viburnum
- Species: V. treleasei

Binomial name
- Viburnum treleasei Gand.

= Viburnum treleasei =

Species of plant

Viburnum treleasei (Portuguese: folhado), the Azorean laurustinus, is a species in the genus Viburnum endemic to the Azores. It inhabits natural forests of Juniperus brevifolia, Laurus azorica and Ilex perado, Erica azorica, in sloping areas. Generally at altitudes above 200 m (660 ft). It is present in eight of the nine islands.
