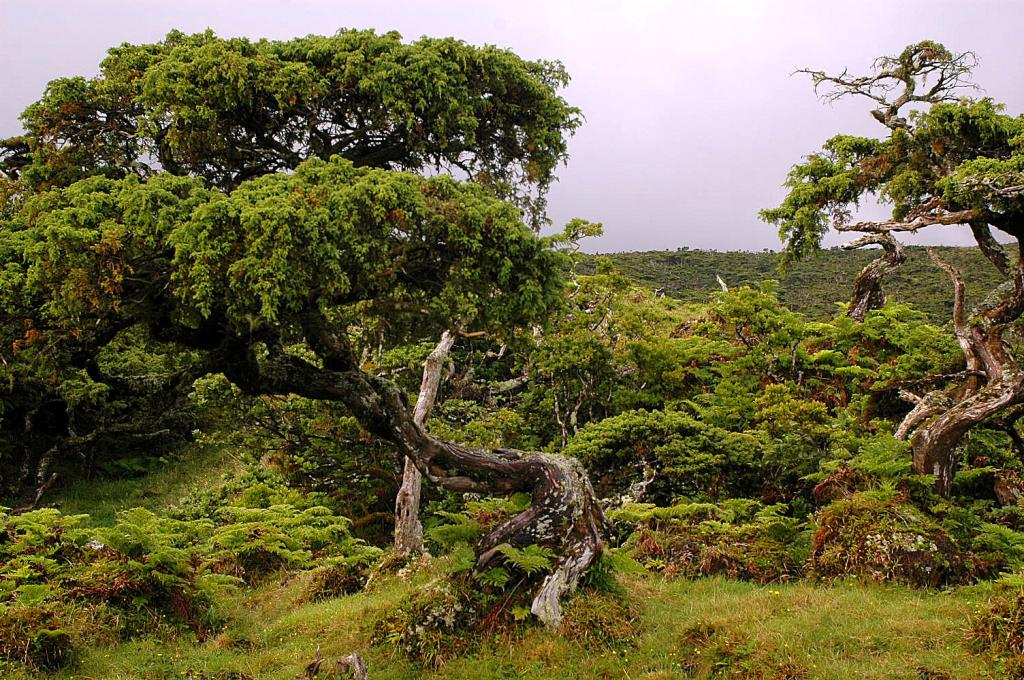
- Juniperus brevifolia on the humid montane dwarf forests of Pico Island

Conservation status
- Vulnerable (IUCN 3.1)

Scientific classification
- Kingdom: Plantae
- Clade: Tracheophytes
- Clade: Gymnospermae
- Division: Pinophyta
- Class: Pinopsida
- Order: Cupressales
- Family: Cupressaceae
- Genus: Juniperus
- Section: Juniperus sect. Juniperus
- Species: J. brevifolia

Binomial name
- Juniperus brevifolia (Seub.) Antoine

Subspecies and varieties
- Juniperus brevifolia subsp. brevifolia; Juniperus brevifolia subsp. maritima R.B.Elias & E.Días; Juniperus brevifolia var. montana R.B.Elias & E.Días

Synonyms
- Juniperus oxycedrus var. brevifolia Seub.; Juniperus rufescens var. brevifolia (Seub.) Endl.

= Juniperus brevifolia =

Species of conifer

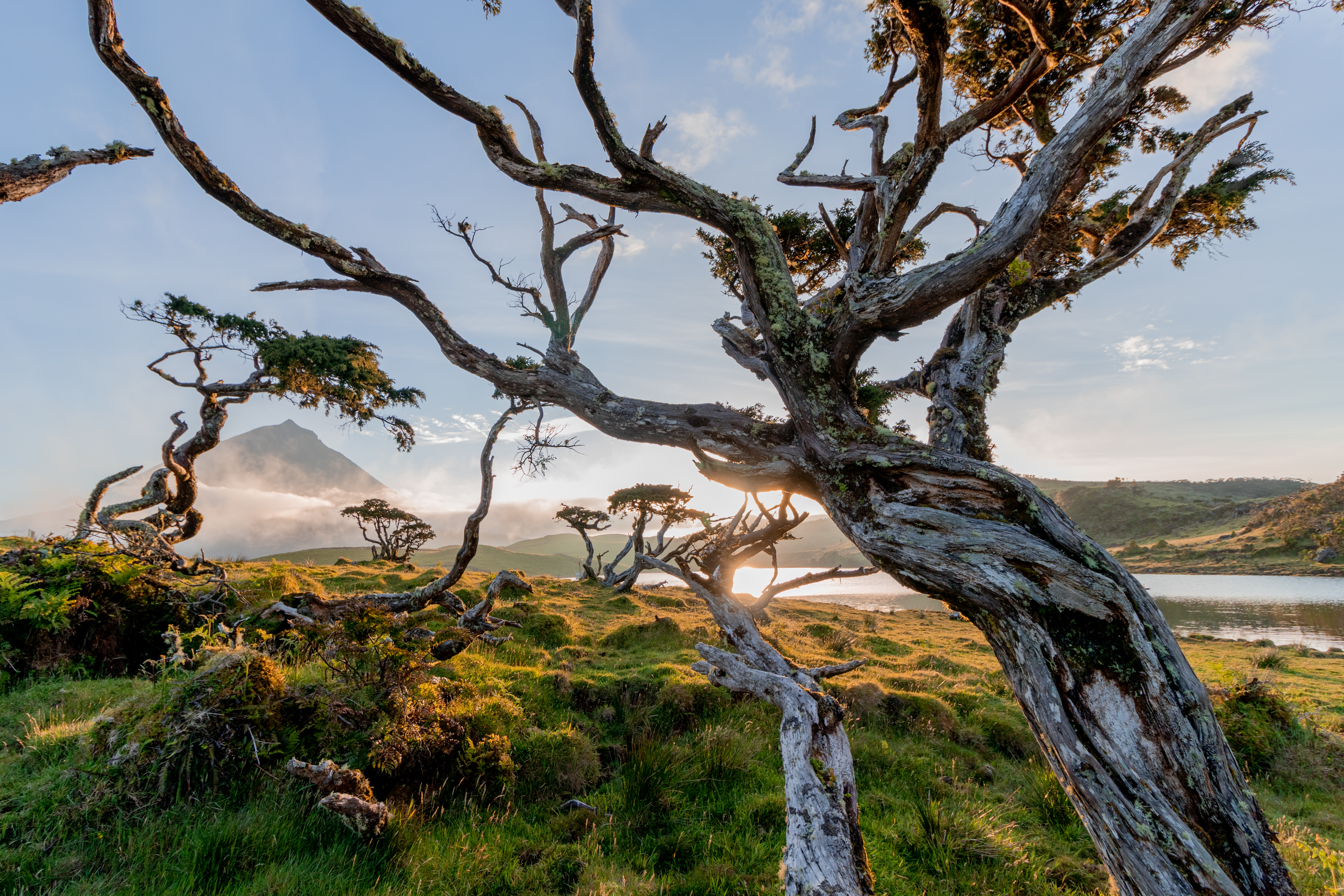
In the Special Protection Area of Zona Central do Pico, Azores

Juniperus brevifolia, the Azores juniper, is a species of juniper native to the Azores (on Corvo, Faial, Flores, Pico, Santa Maria, São Jorge, São Miguel, and Terceira), where it occurs from sea level up to 1,500 m (4,900 ft) elevation. It is closely related to Juniperus oxycedrus (prickly juniper) of the Mediterranean region and Juniperus cedrus (Canary Islands juniper) of the neighboring Macaronesian islands. It is threatened by habitat loss.

== Description ==
It is a shrub or small tree growing to a height of 6 m (20 ft) and a trunk diameter up to 50 centimetres (20 in). The leaves are evergreen, needle-like, in whorls of three, glaucous green, 4–10 millimetres (1/4–1/2 in) long and 1–3 mm broad, with a double white stomatal band (split by a green midrib) on the inner surface. It is dioecious, with separate male and female plants. The seed cones are berry-like, green ripening in 18 months to orange-red with a variable pink waxy coating; they are spherical, 6–9 mm diameter, and have three or six fused scales in one or two whorls of three, the three larger scales each with a single seed. The seeds are dispersed when birds eat the cones, digesting the fleshy scales and passing the hard seeds in their droppings. The male cones are yellow, 2–3 mm long, and fall soon after shedding their pollen in early spring.

== Subdivisions and habitat ==
Three subdivisions are accepted. They vary in form and habitat.

- Juniperus brevifolia subsp. brevifolia – a small to medium tree found between 300 and 1000 metres elevation on Corvo, Faial, Flores, Pico, Santa Maria, Sao Jorge, Sao Miguel, and Terceira. It grows in a variety of habitats, including Juniperus–Laurus azorica forest, Juniperus–Ilex perado subsp. azorica forest, in pure Juniperus woods and Juniperus–Sphagnum woods, and in pioneer scrubland on lava flows with Erica azorica, Calluna vulgaris, and Vaccinium cylindraceum.
- Juniperus brevifolia subsp. maritima R.B.Elias & E.Días – an erect shrub or small tree native to coastal scrubs below 100 metres on Flores, Terceira, Pico and São Jorge, often growing with Myrica faya and Erica azorica.
- Juniperus brevifolia var. montana R.B.Elias & E.Días – a small prostrate shrub common in mountain scrubs and blanket bogs between 850 and 1500 metres elevation, often with Calluna vulgaris.

== Conservation ==
This is a vulnerable species in its native range due to a combination of historical felling for the valuable wood and competition from invasive introduced plants.

On the island of Graciosa, Juniperus brevifolia has gone extinct, and on the other islands, it remains endangered. The decline in population is due to habitat fragmentations of its preferred habitat (laurel forest) caused by island colonization and grazing pressures.
