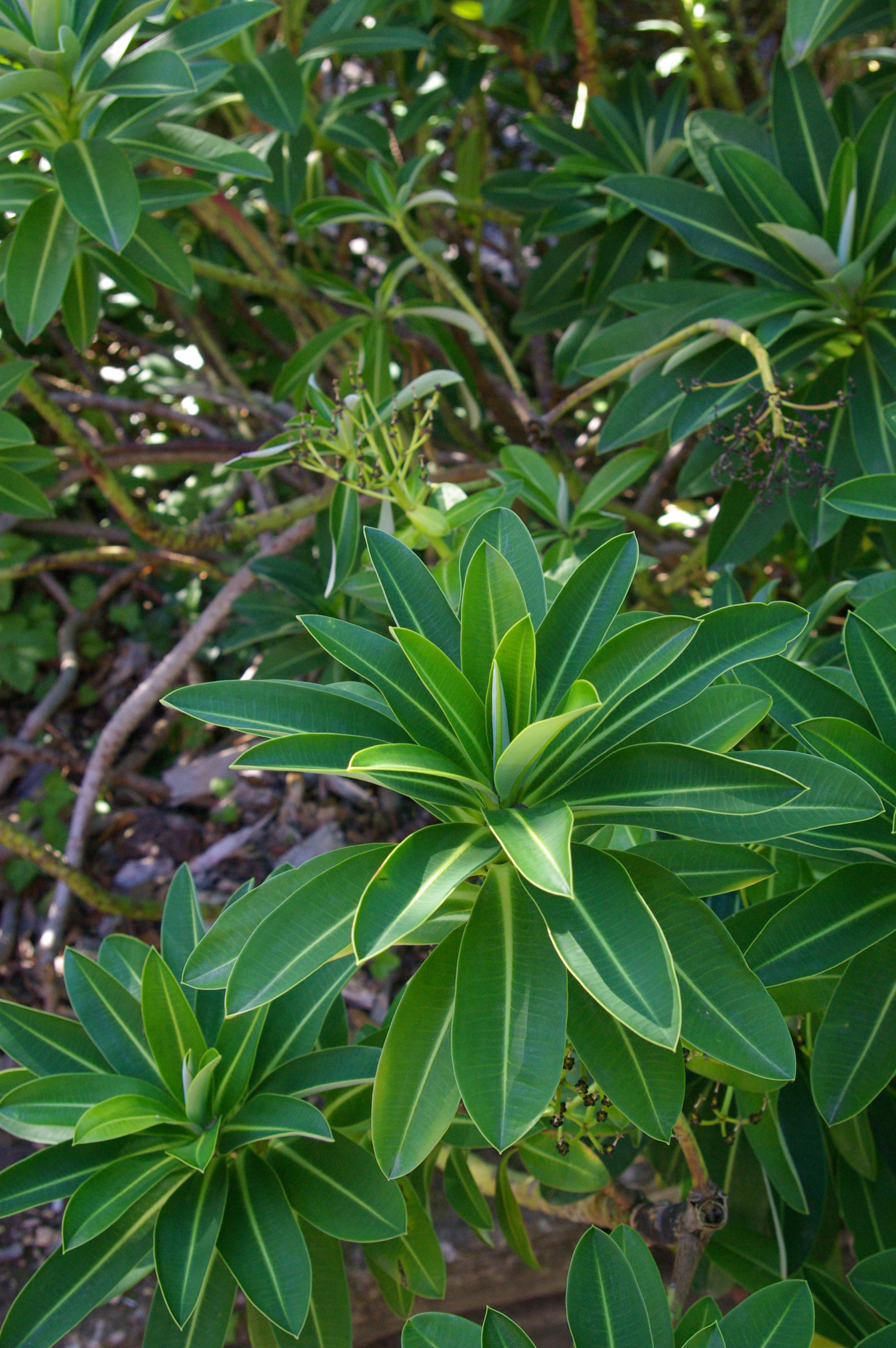

Scientific classification
- Kingdom: Plantae
- Clade: Tracheophytes
- Clade: Angiosperms
- Clade: Eudicots
- Clade: Rosids
- Order: Malpighiales
- Family: Euphorbiaceae
- Genus: Euphorbia
- Species: E. stygiana

Binomial name
- Euphorbia stygiana H.C.Watson

Synonyms
- Tithymalus stygianus (H.C.Watson) Soják

= Euphorbia stygiana =

Species of flowering plant

Euphorbia stygiana (Portuguese: Trovisco-macho) is a species of evergreen shrub in the family Euphorbiaceae, endemic to several islands of the Azores. It has a critically endangered subspecies (subsp. santamariae) with only 20 known remaining mature individuals in the wild.

== Description ==
Euphorbia stygiana is an evergreen shrub with low but robust serpentine, green stems; white-veined, thick, leathery blue-dark green leaves and large yellow-green flower heads which are strongly honey-scented in spring and summer (from May to June). It can grow up to about 10 metres (33 ft) tall in its native environment but is often 1.5 metres (4.9 ft) tall and spreads to about 1.5 metres (4.9 ft) wide.

The leaves are 7–14 by 1.5–3.5 centimetres (2.76 in–5.51 in × 0.59 in–1.38 in) long, slightly pubescent on the bottom side. The fruits are 5–7 millimetres (0.20–0.28 in), striated, subglobous and warty. During cold winters (especially outside its native range) these leaves may turn to a brilliant crimson colour.

It is hardy down to USDA Zone 8b: to −9.4 °C (15.1 °F) and can be propagated through stem cuttings.

== Distribution and habitat ==
Euphorbia stygiana is endemic to all Azorean islands except Graciosa where it inhabits the extremely humid highlands of the archipelago from 300 to 1,100 metres (980 to 3,610 ft) in altitude, especially on Pico Island, in sheltered places such as ravines, craters and dense laurel-Juniperus forests.

== Subspecies ==
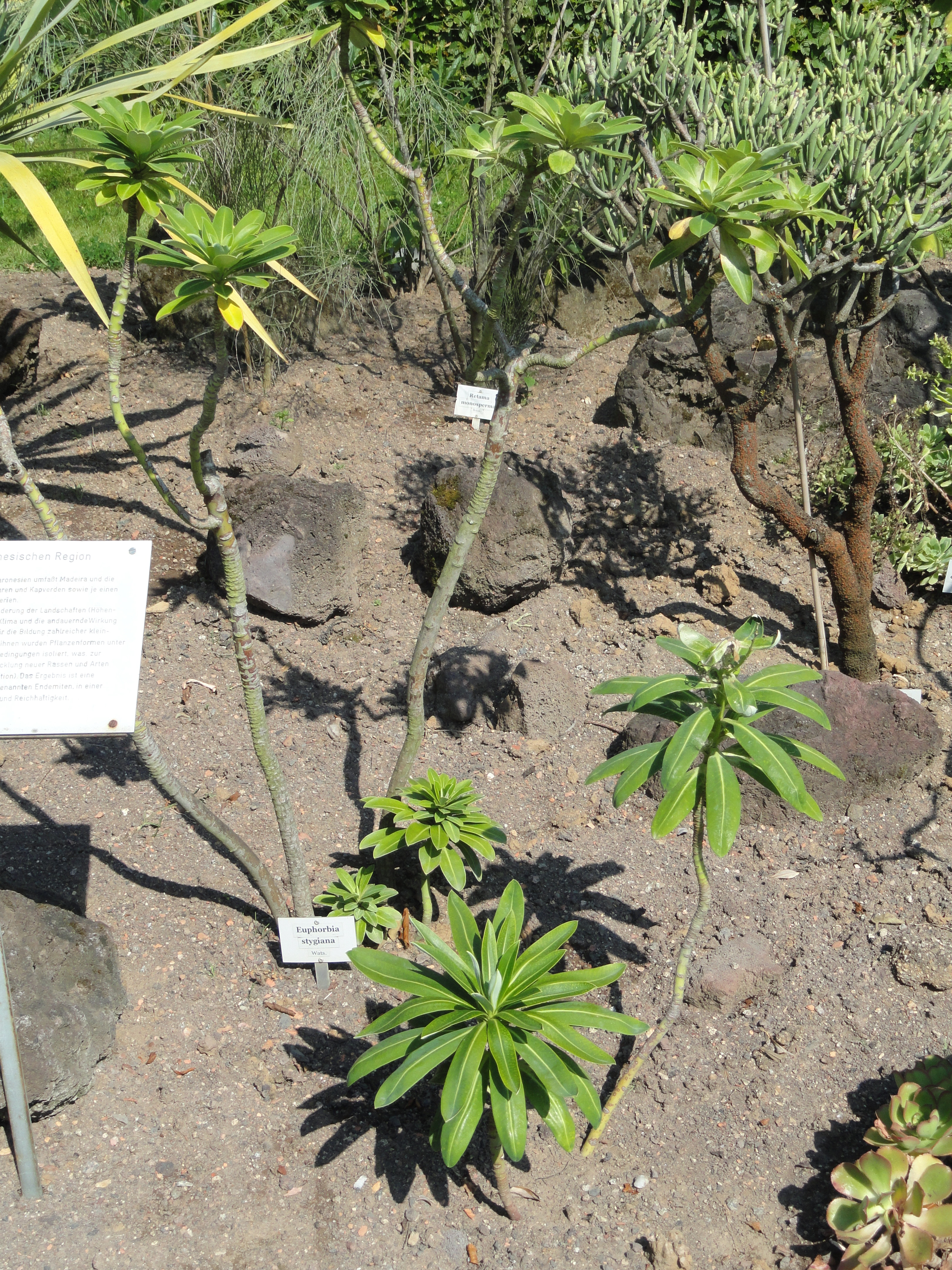
Specimen at the Frankfurt Botanical Garden

There are two known subspecies:

- subsp. santamariae – a critically endangered subspecies native only to the island of Santa Maria with less than 20 known mature individuals remaining in the wild, restricted to 343 square kilometres (132 sq mi). The remaining population rests in a steep slope of a valley embedded in a stream, in a humid forest dominated by Pittosporum undulatum. It is a smaller tree, and has a strong apical dominance. Foliage is less leathery with a faint bluish bloom. It also has a less pronounced leaf vein and has fuzzy inflorescences with orange extrafloral nectaries.
- subsp. stygiana – the most common subspecies, inhabiting most of the Azorean islands except Graciosa and Santa Maria in high altitude, humid laurel-Juniperus forests.

== Threats ==
The species is mainly threatened by agricultural development, change in land use, and invasive species and the subsequent increase in competition.

== Toxicity ==
Like other members of the Euphorbia genus, E. stygiana has a milky white sap that may cause skin irritation or allergic reaction when in contact with the skin or eye. It is toxic if eaten.

== Gallery ==
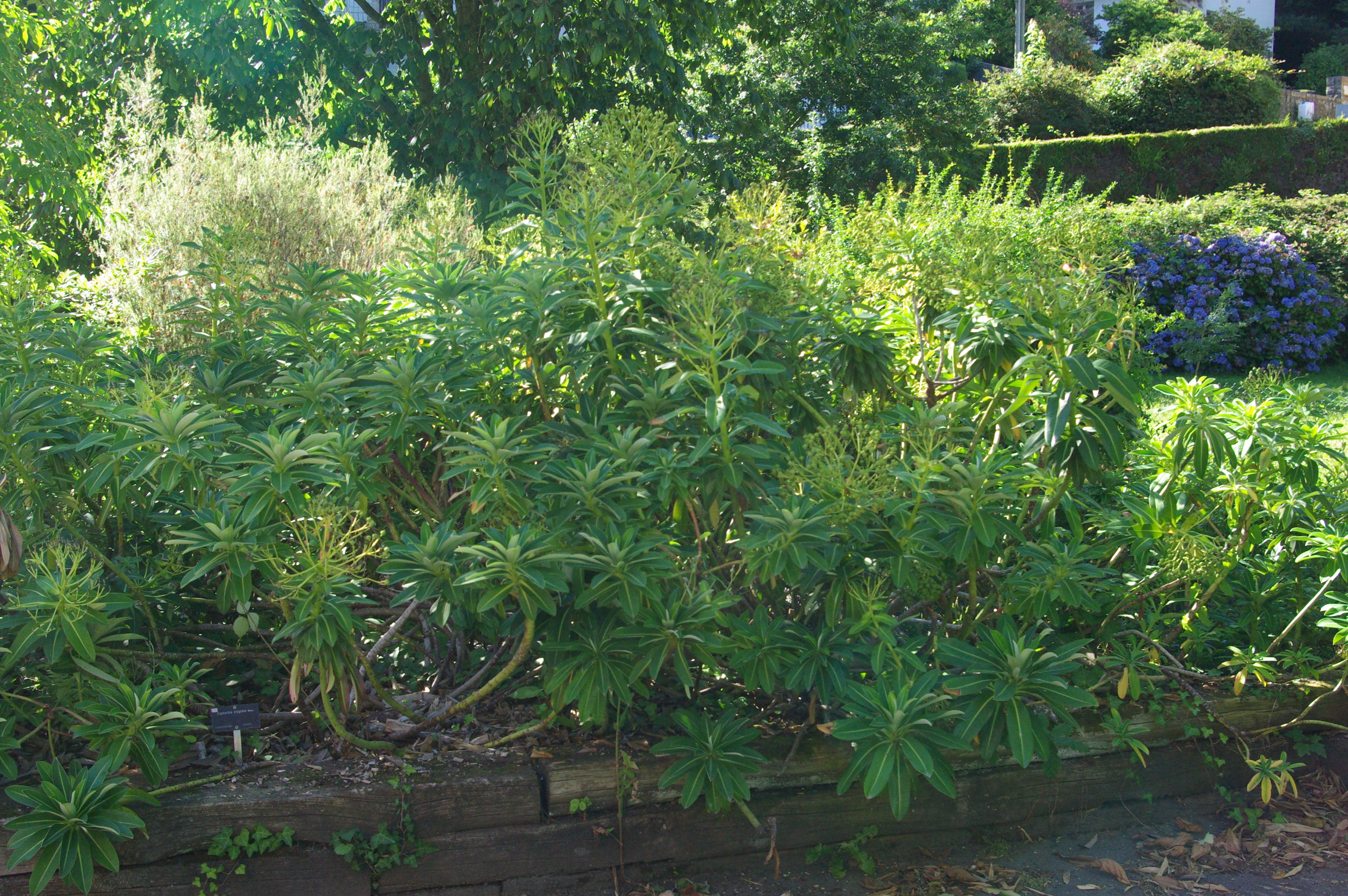
Specimen in the National Botanical Conservatory of Brest, France

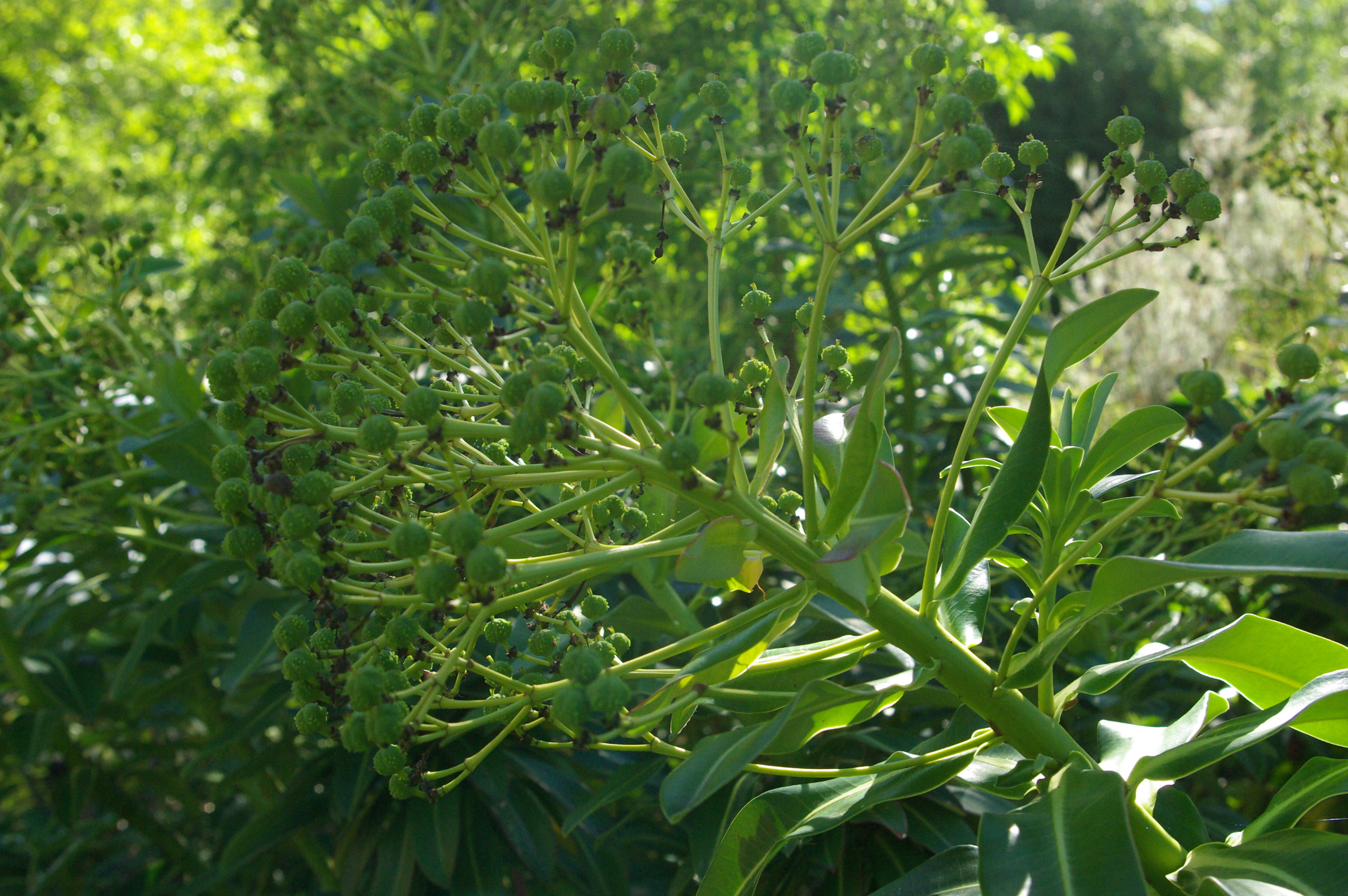
Closeup of fruit

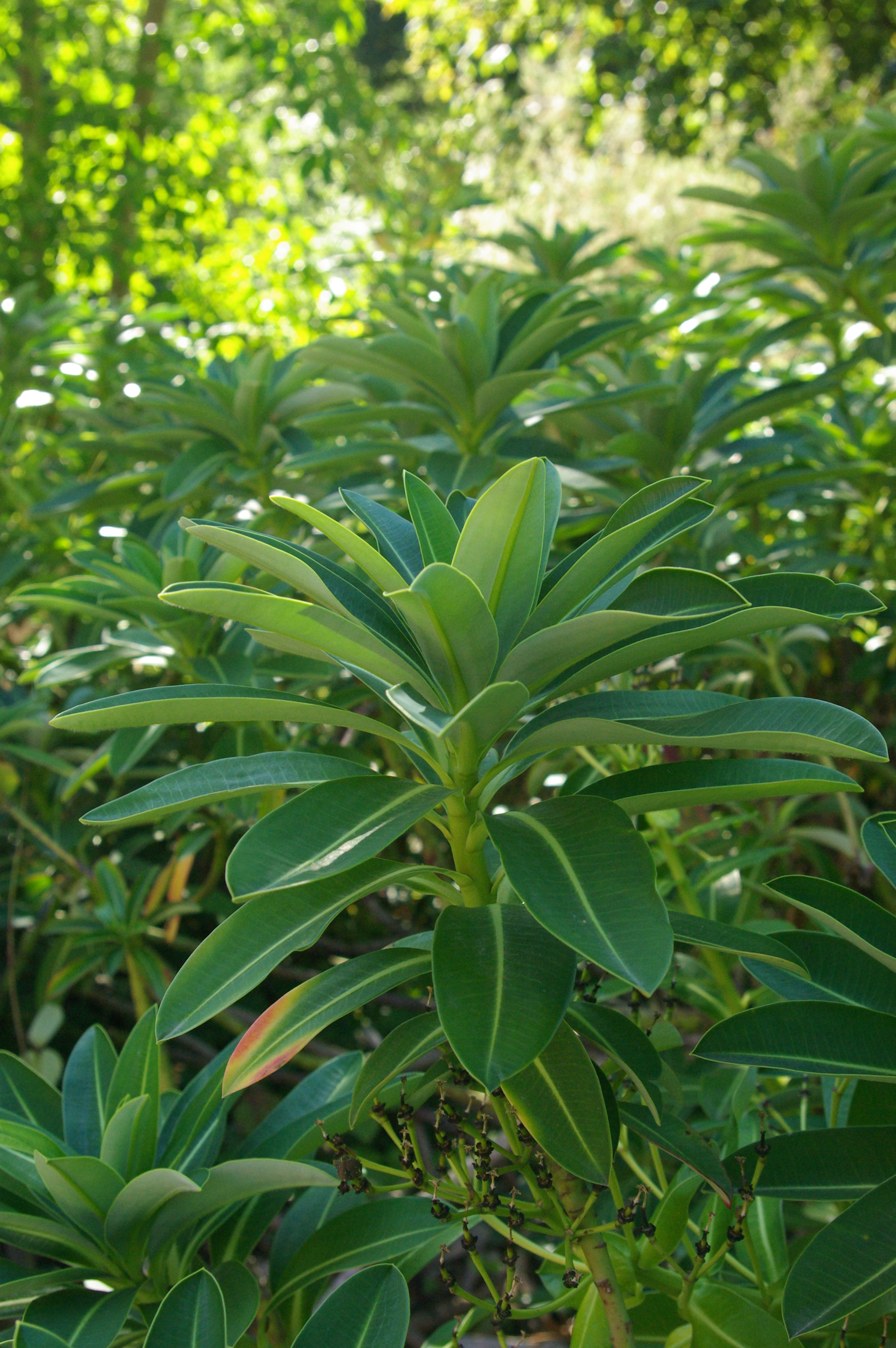

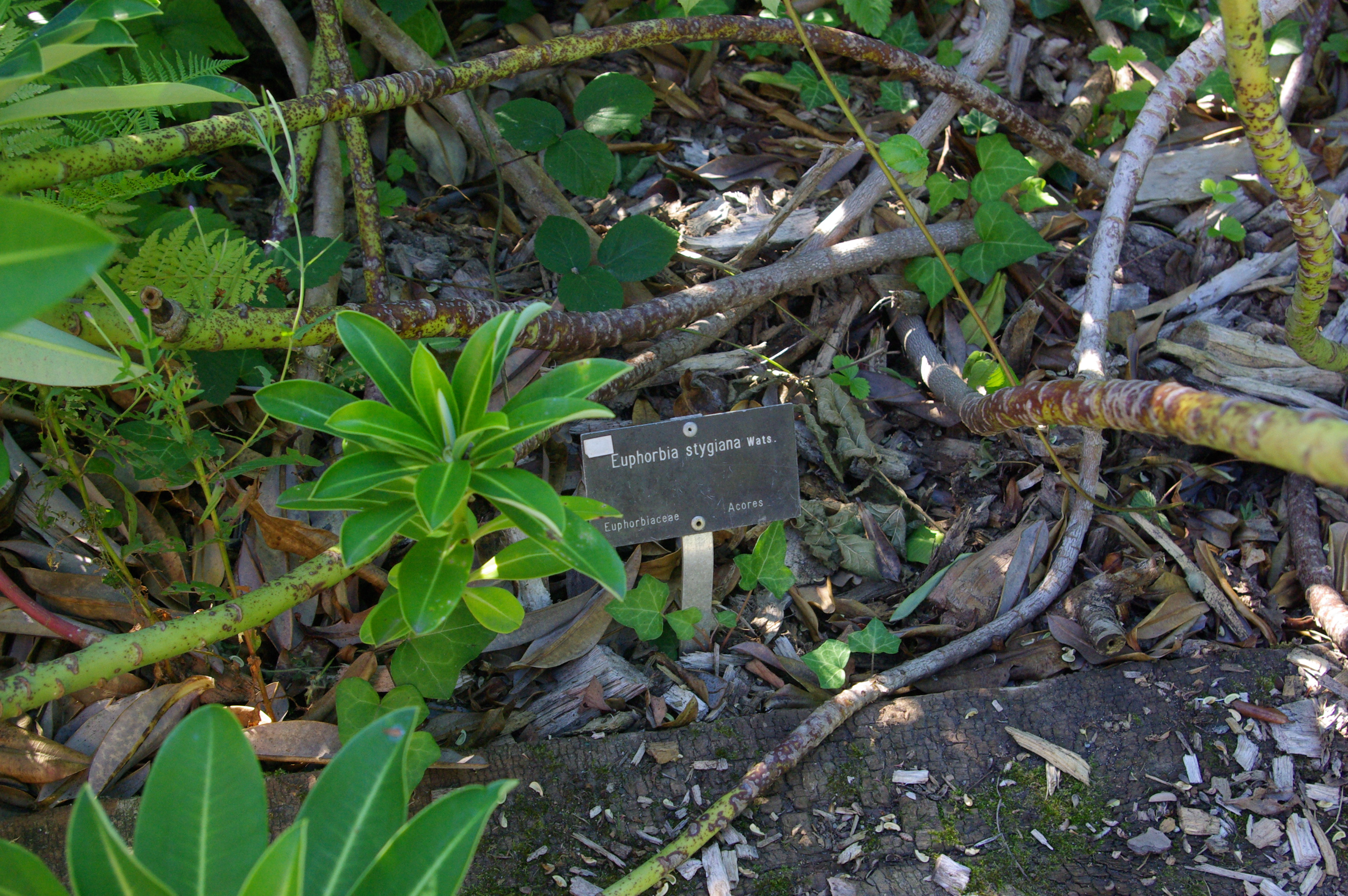
