= Moritz August Seubert =

German botanist (1818–1878)

Moritz August Seubert (2 June 1818, in Karlsruhe – 8 April 1878, in Karlsruhe) was a German botanist.

== Life ==
Seubert was the son of a medical officer of health. He first attended the Lyzeum in Karlsruhe and already at that time had contact with the botanist, Alexander Braun, who interested him in this subject. As of 1836, he studied medicine at the University of Heidelberg and then in 1837, he studied natural science at the University of Bonn. His teachers in Bonn were Georg August Goldfuss, Ludolph Christian Treviranus and Johann Jakob Nöggerath. After receiving his PhD in Bonn, he moved to the University of Berlin, where he qualified as a professor. In 1843, he began teaching as a private lecturer in Bonn.

In 1846, he was offered a chair as professor for botany and zoology at the University of Karlsruhe as the successor to Alexander Braun. At the same time, he succeeded Braun as the head of the Großherzoglichen Naturalienkabinetts (Grand Ducal Natural History Specimen Cabinet) and of the Karlsruhe Botanical Gardens. In addition, he was the librarian of the Großherzoglichen Hof- und Landesbibliothek (Grand Ducal Court and State Library).

Besides teaching and administration, Seubert also published several works. His Flora azorica, in which he critically appraised the herbariums of Christian Ferdinand Friedrich Hochstetter and his son, Karl Hochstetter, appeared in 1844. He also worked on a series of plant families in Flora Brasiliensis, published by Carl Friedrich Philipp von Martius, among which were the Alismataceae, Amaryllidaceae, Butomaceae and Liliaceae. In addition, he wrote a Lehrbuch der gesamten Pflanzenkunde (Textbook of All of Botany), which appeared in five editions. In 1836, his Exkursionsflora für das Großherzogthum Baden (Study Trip Flora for the Grand Duchy of Baden) appeared and another one for southwestern Germany was published in 1869.

In 1843, Carl Sigismund Kunth named the genus Seubertia (family Liliaceae) in his honor.

== Bibliography ==
- Exkursionsflora für das Großherzogthum Baden.
- Lehrbuch der gesammten Pflanzenkunde . Winter, Leipzig 2. Aufl. 1858 Digital edition by the University and State Library Düsseldorf; (fifth edition published in 1870).
- Flora Azorica (with Christian Ferdinand Hochstetter).
- Symbolae ad erinacei europaei anatomen.
