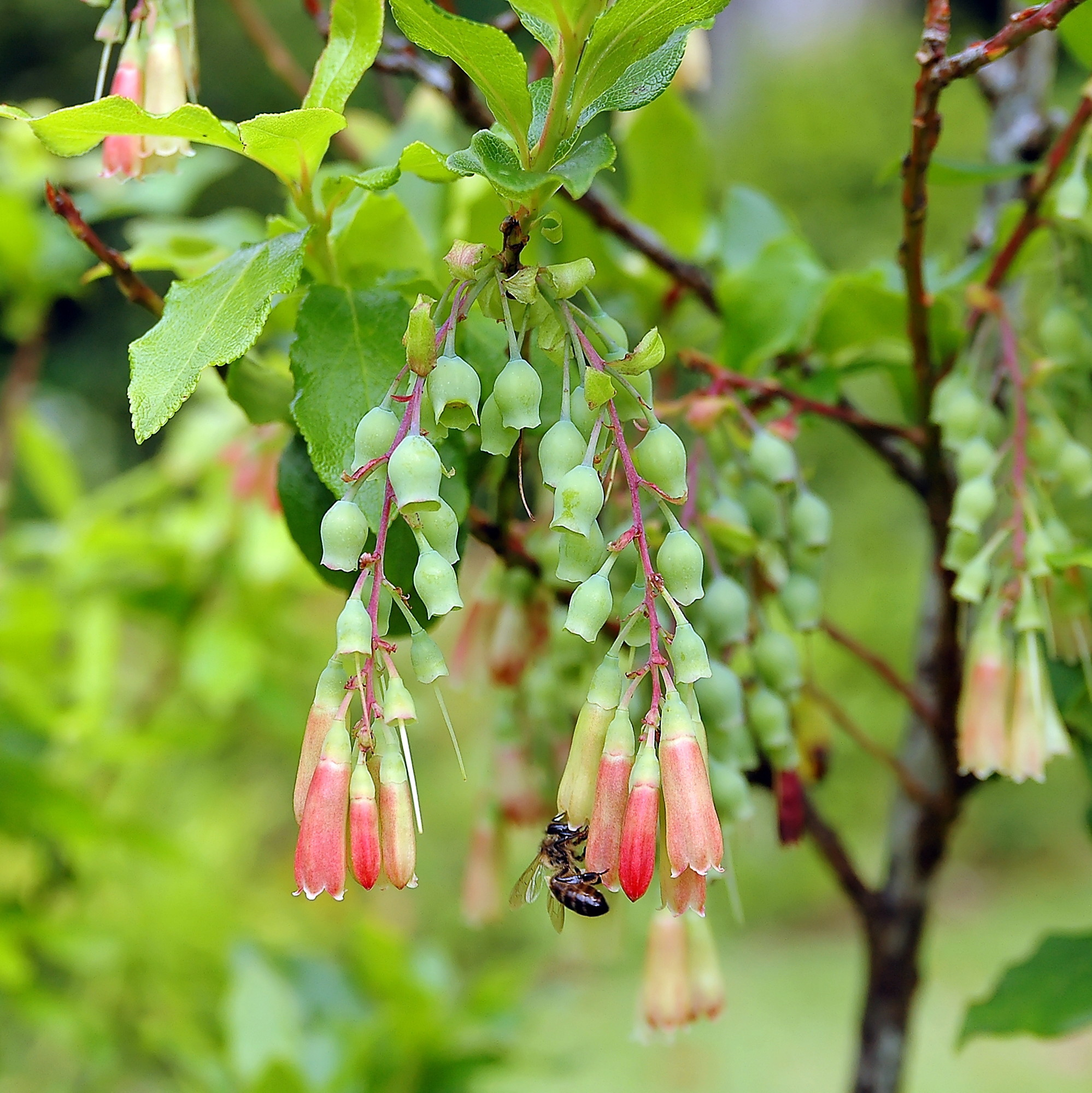

Conservation status
- Least Concern (IUCN 3.1)

Scientific classification
- Kingdom: Plantae
- Clade: Embryophytes
- Clade: Tracheophytes
- Clade: Angiosperms
- Clade: Eudicots
- Clade: Asterids
- Order: Ericales
- Family: Ericaceae
- Genus: Vaccinium
- Species: V. cylindraceum

Binomial name
- Vaccinium cylindraceum Sm.

Synonyms
- Vaccinium longiflorum Wikstr.

= Vaccinium cylindraceum =

Species of flowering plant

Vaccinium cylindraceum, known by its common names such as Azores blueberry, (Portuguese: uva-da-serra, uva-do-mato) is a species of Vaccinium endemic to the Azores.

== Description ==
The plant can be propagated by seed or by cuttings. It forms a shrub reaching up to 3 metres (10 feet) in height. The leaves are semi-deciduous, elongated with sharp tips, and serrated. Initially red, the apical shoots may have a bright red colour.

The plant is a hermaphrodite. The plant flowers between May and June. The flowers are trumpet-shaped, with a pinkish white colour, and usually occur in clusters. In autumn the leaves may change to a reddish-yellow. The fruit is a cylindrical black pseudo-berry up to 2.5 centimetres (1 inch) long; it is fleshy and juicy. The plant has a diploid set of genes, with a total of 48 chromosomes.

== Distribution and habitat ==
This plant is endemic to the Azores, where it can be found on all islands except Corvo and Graciosa.

This species can be found at elevations between 380–1,400 m (1,250–4,590 ft). It grows best in acidic, loam, well-drained soil and can grow in little to no shade.

== Uses ==
The species has gained the Royal Horticultural Society's Award of Garden Merit as an ornamental.
