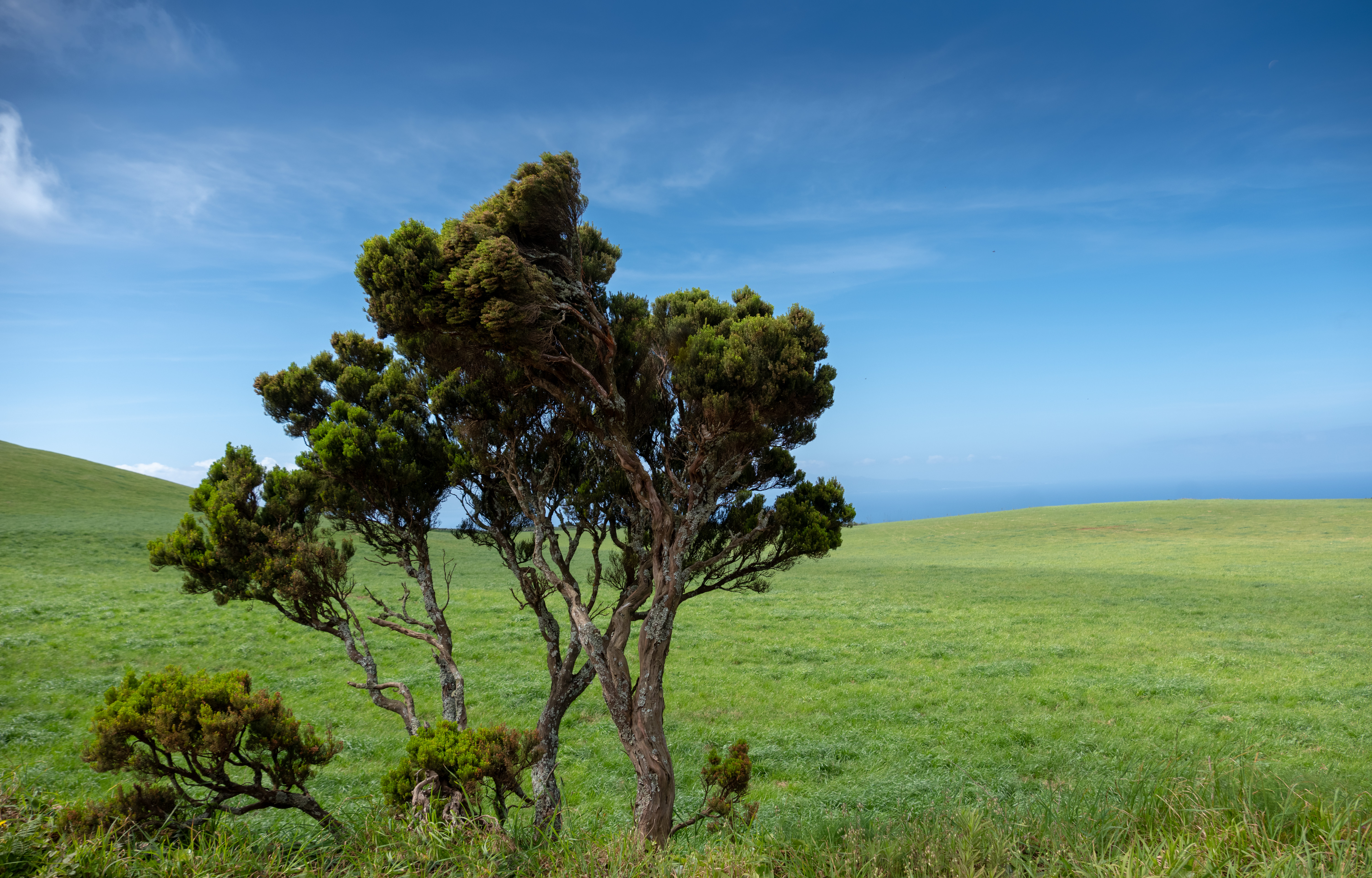
- A lonely Erica azorica in São Jorge, Azores

Scientific classification
- Kingdom: Plantae
- Clade: Tracheophytes
- Clade: Angiosperms
- Clade: Eudicots
- Clade: Asterids
- Order: Ericales
- Family: Ericaceae
- Genus: Erica
- Species: E. azorica

Binomial name
- Erica azorica Hochst.

Synonyms
- Erica scoparia subsp. azorica (Hochst. ex Seub.); Ericodes azoricum (Hochst. ex Seub.)

= Erica azorica =

Species of plant

Erica azorica (Portuguese: urze) is a species of heath endemic to the Azores.

== Distribution ==
Erica azorica is mainly distributed on coastal cliffs, lava flows, dry slopes, in natural forests, Australian cheesewood woodlands, ravines and craters of the Azorean archipelago, from sea level to the highest altitudes.

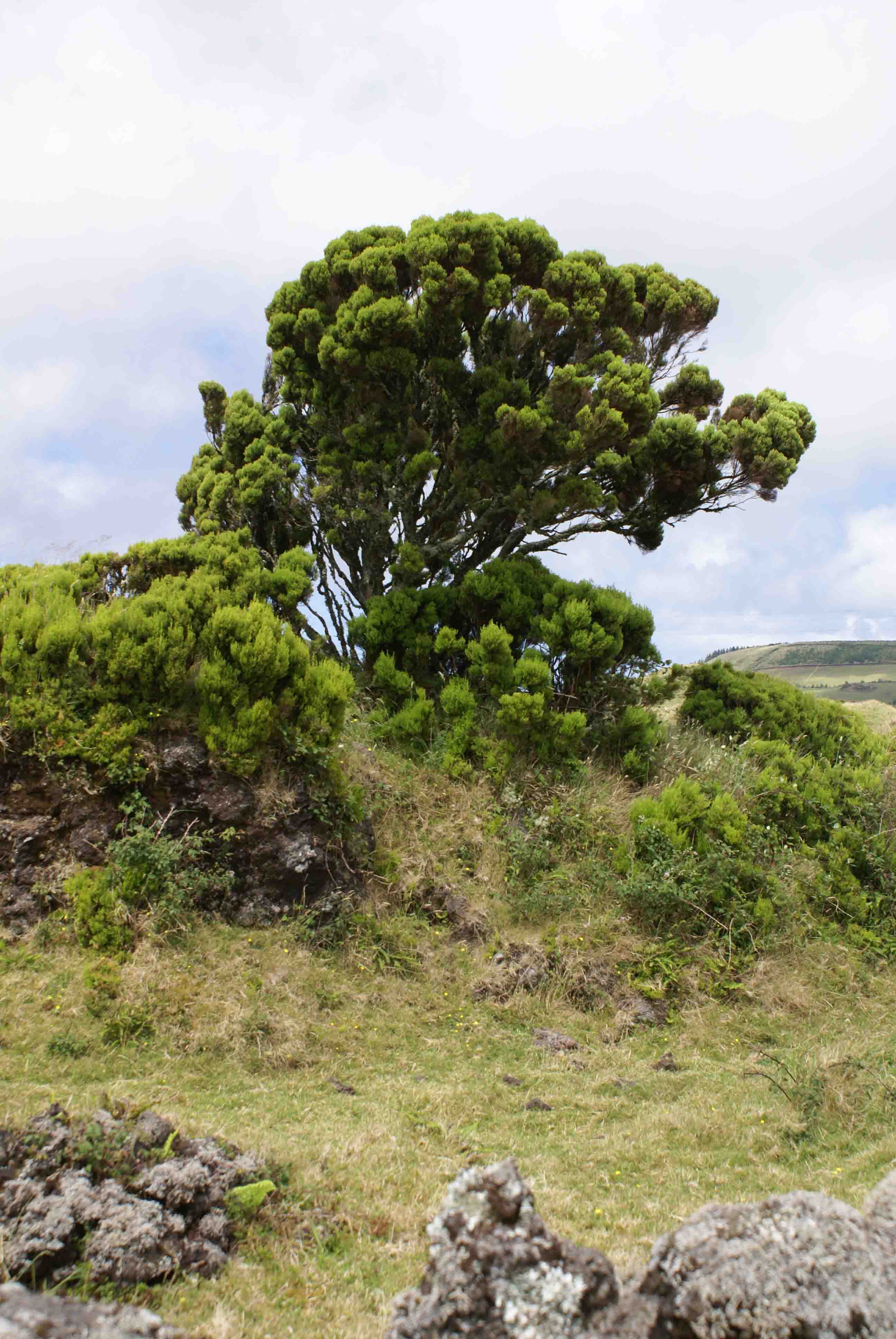
Erica azorica on Terceira Island
