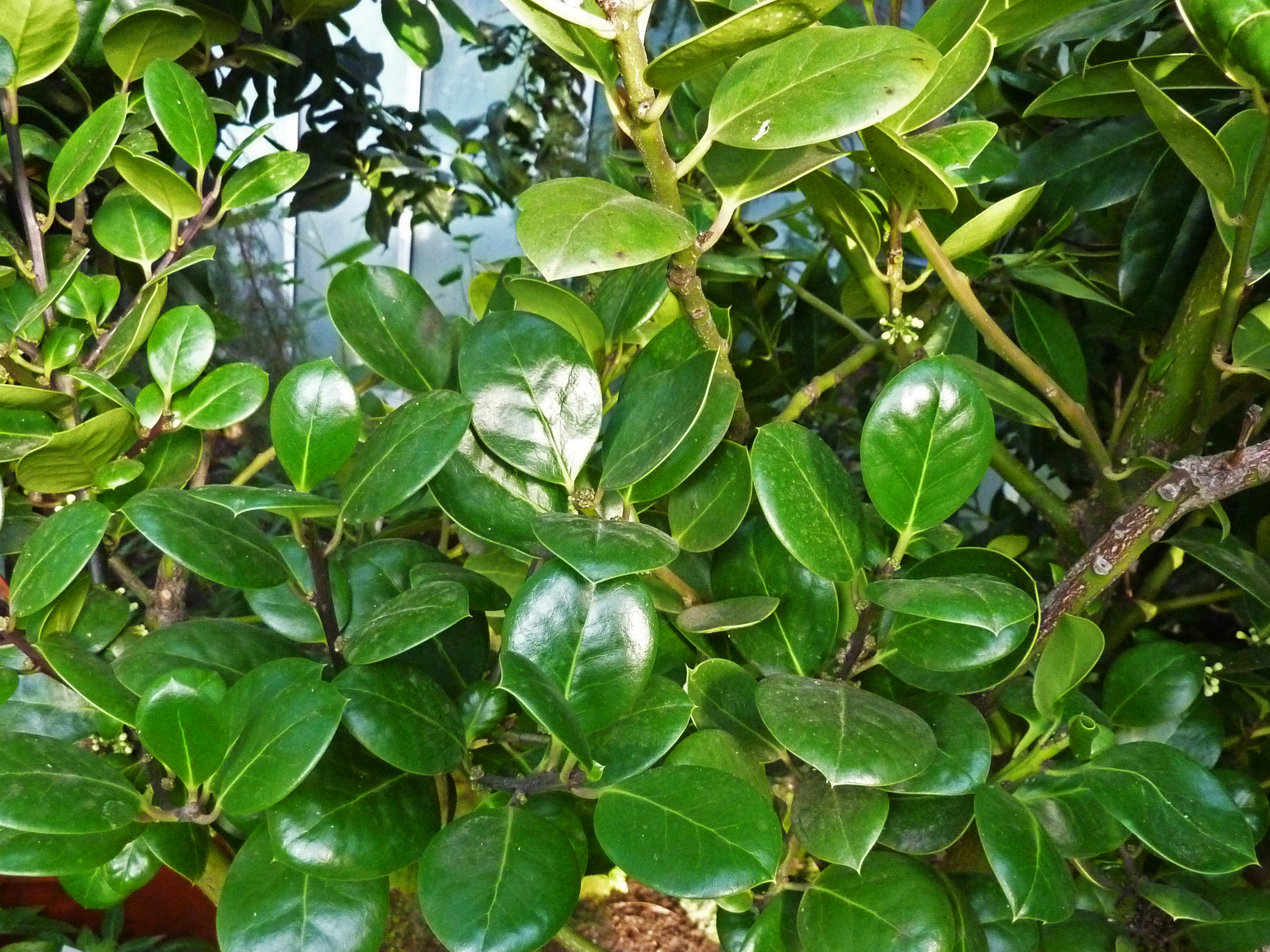
- Ilex perado subsp. azorica

Conservation status
- Least Concern (IUCN 3.1)

Scientific classification
- Kingdom: Plantae
- Clade: Embryophytes
- Clade: Tracheophytes
- Clade: Spermatophytes
- Clade: Angiosperms
- Clade: Eudicots
- Clade: Asterids
- Order: Aquifoliales
- Family: Aquifoliaceae
- Genus: Ilex
- Species: I. perado

Binomial name
- Ilex perado Aiton

Synonyms
- Ilex azorica Gand.; Ilex perado f. umbrosa P. Silva & Q. G. P. Silva; Ilex perado iberica Loes.; Ilex platyphylla subsp. lopezlilloi G. Kunkel; Ilex perado var. lopezlilloi (Kunkel) S. Andrews; Ilex perulera Molinari; Ilex maderensis Lam.; Ilex crassifolia Meerb.; Ilex perado Webb & Berthel.; Ilex platyphylla Webb & Berthel.

= Ilex perado =

Species of plant

Ilex perado, the Macaronesian holly, is a species of holly endemic to Macaronesia, distributed throughout the Azores, Madeira and Canary islands. It is an important component of the natural high-altitude Macaronesian rainforest, known as 'laurisilva', found mostly at 500 to 1,200 m (1,640 to 3,937 ft) altitude but it also appears in forest formations at lower elevation. Many of the subspecies have been classified as threatened, probably because of very small population sizes, and are protected by local, national and regional legislation.

== Description ==
Ilex perado is a small evergreen tree growing up to 7–10 m (23–33 ft) in height, occasionally up to 15 metres (49 ft), it is dioecious and has white to pink flowers and red toxic berries, slightly bigger than those of a common holly Its leaves are oblong, leathery dark green on top and a lighter color on the bottom and it as a smooth, grey trunk.

== Distribution and habitat ==
Ilex perado is native to the Azores, where it is found in all of the islands, the island of Madeira (mostly in the central and northern parts) and the Canary Islands in northern Tenerife, La Gomera and La Palma. It grows on steep slopes and in the bottom of ravines, in areas with moist soils. It is a common tree of laurisilva and high-altitude forests and can reach non-laurisilva stands in Madeira into the heath.

There are 4 known subspecies:

- I. perado subsp. perado – Endemic to the Madeira archipelago. The population is stable and is thought to be much less than 10,000 adult individuals.
- I. perado subsp. azorica (Loes.) Tutin (synonym Ilex azorica Gand.) – Native to all of the Azorean islands.
- I. perado subsp. lopezlilloi (G. Kunkel) A. Hansen & Sunding – Endemic to La Gomera. Extremely threatened subspecies with only two known specimens found in the wild. Assessed as 'critically endangered' by the IUCN.
- I. perado subsp. platyphylla (Webb & Berthel.) Tutin (synonym Ilex platyphylla Webb & Berthel.) – Native to La Palma, La Gomera and Tenerife in the Canary Islands. Assessed as 'vulnerable' by the IUCN.

Records of the species from the Iberian Peninsula (as Ilex perado subsp. iberica) are thought to be misidentified and refer to I. aquifolium.

This species has numerous subspecies that are thought to potentially be separate species, but more research is needed to determine if this is in fact true. Research has been carried out for Ilex perado subsp. azorica, indicating that it differs genetically from the subpopulations on the Canary Islands.

The species has been cultivated in Britain since 1760 (thriving well in the Isle of Wight), and is also grown in Ireland, the Iberian Peninsula, and South America.

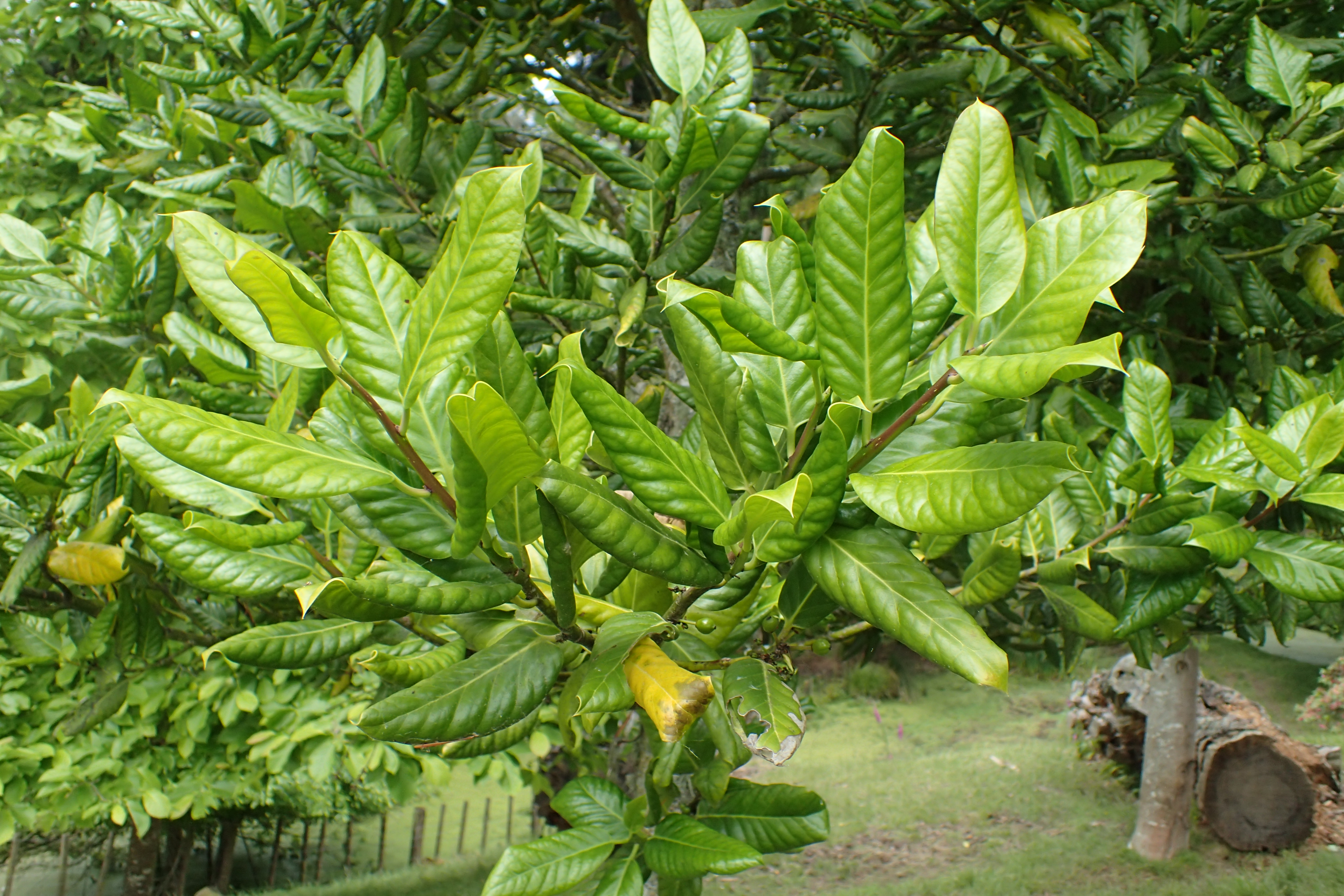
Foliage of subsp. perado

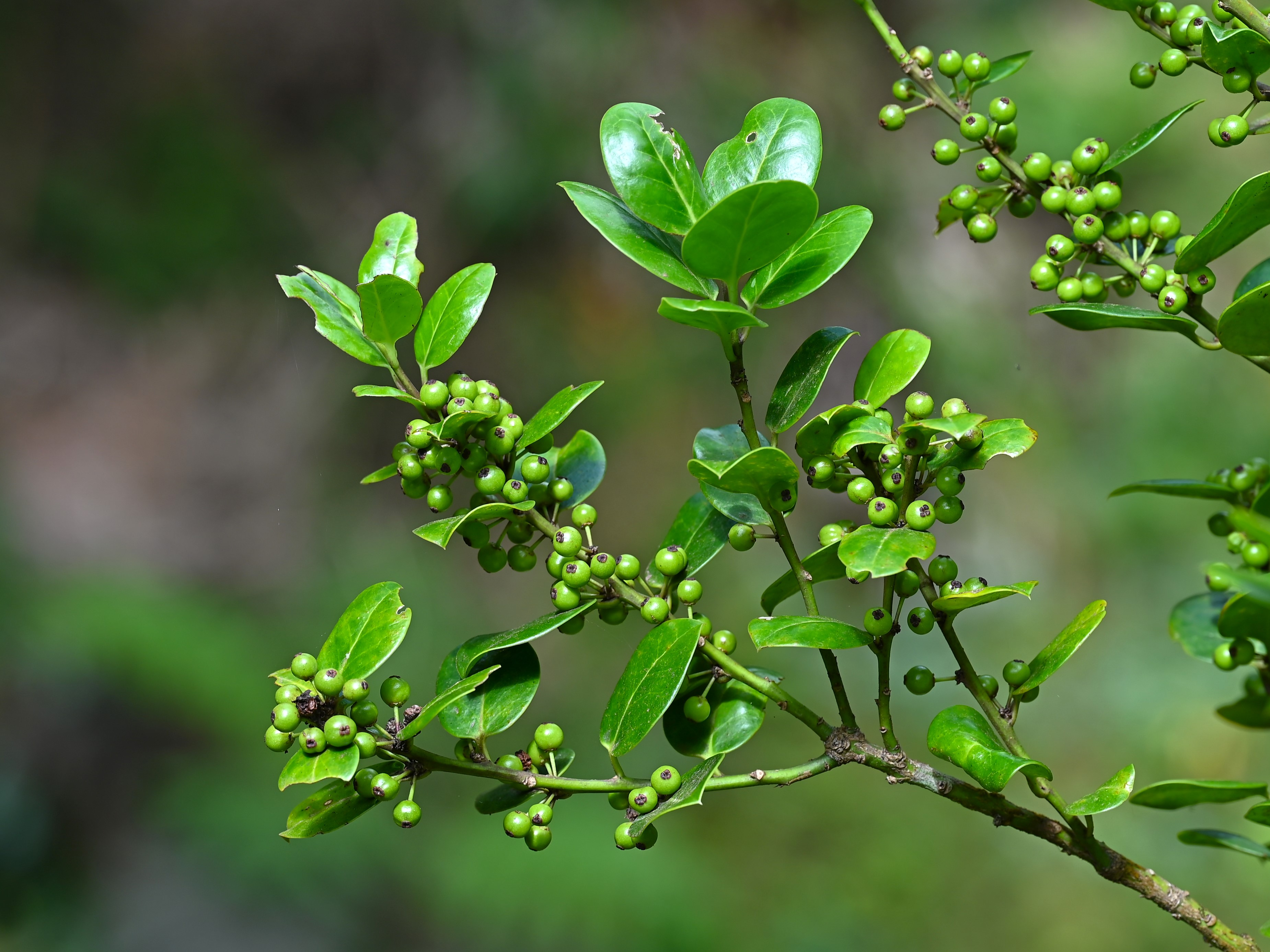
subsp. azorica specimen

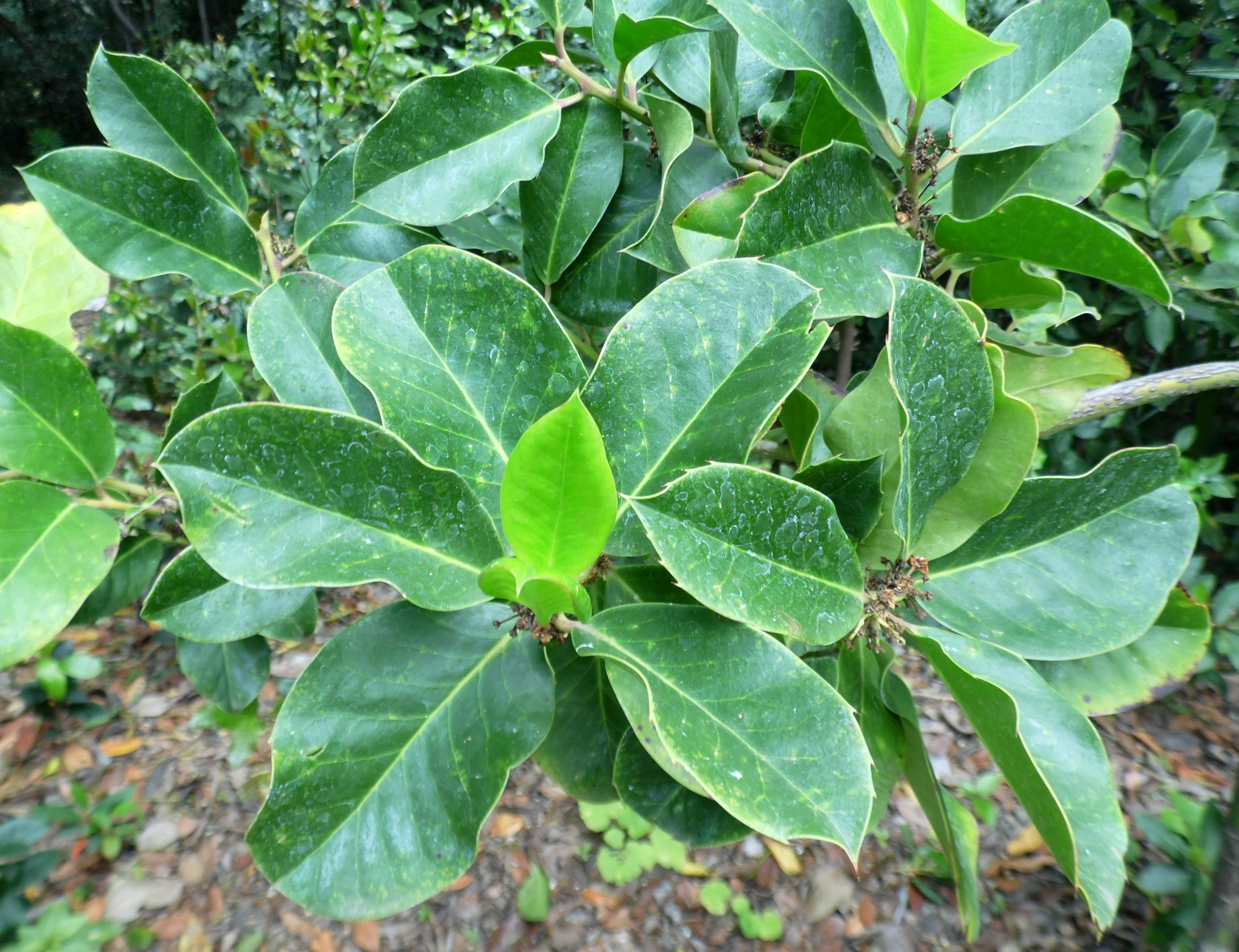
subsp. platyphylla

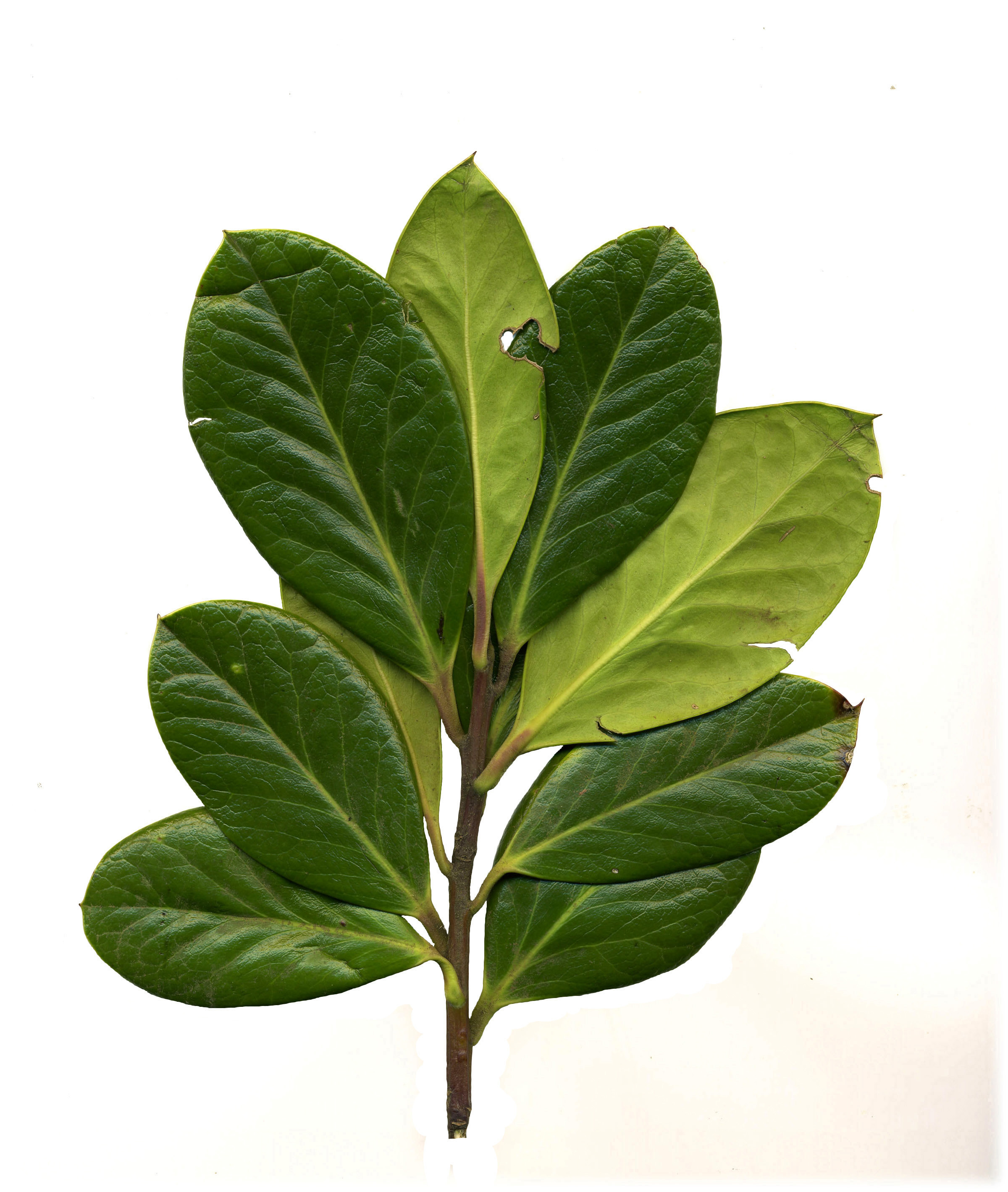
Specimen of subsp. lopezlilloi

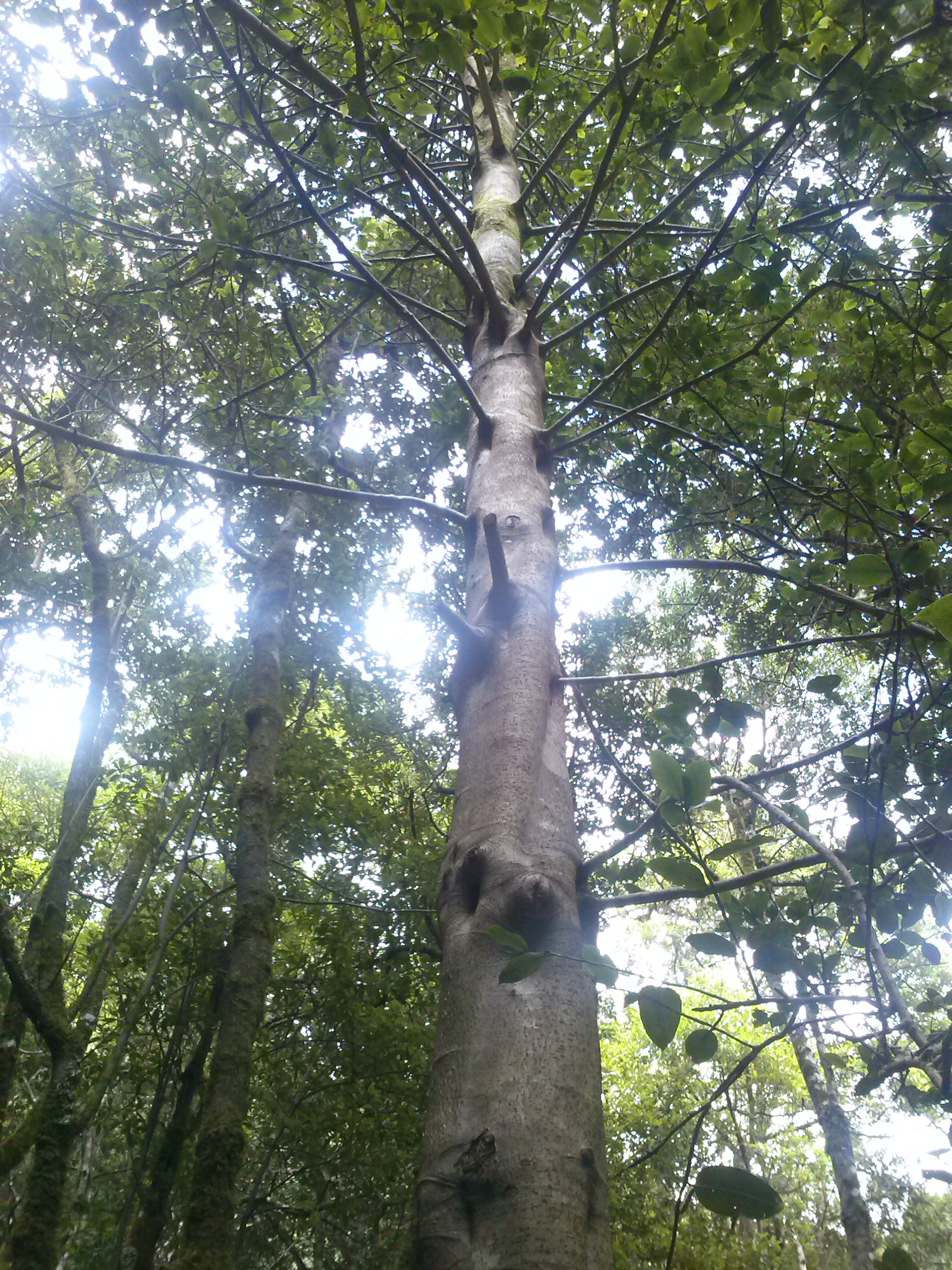
Trunk
