= Queijo do Pico =

Portuguese cheese

Cheese of Pico
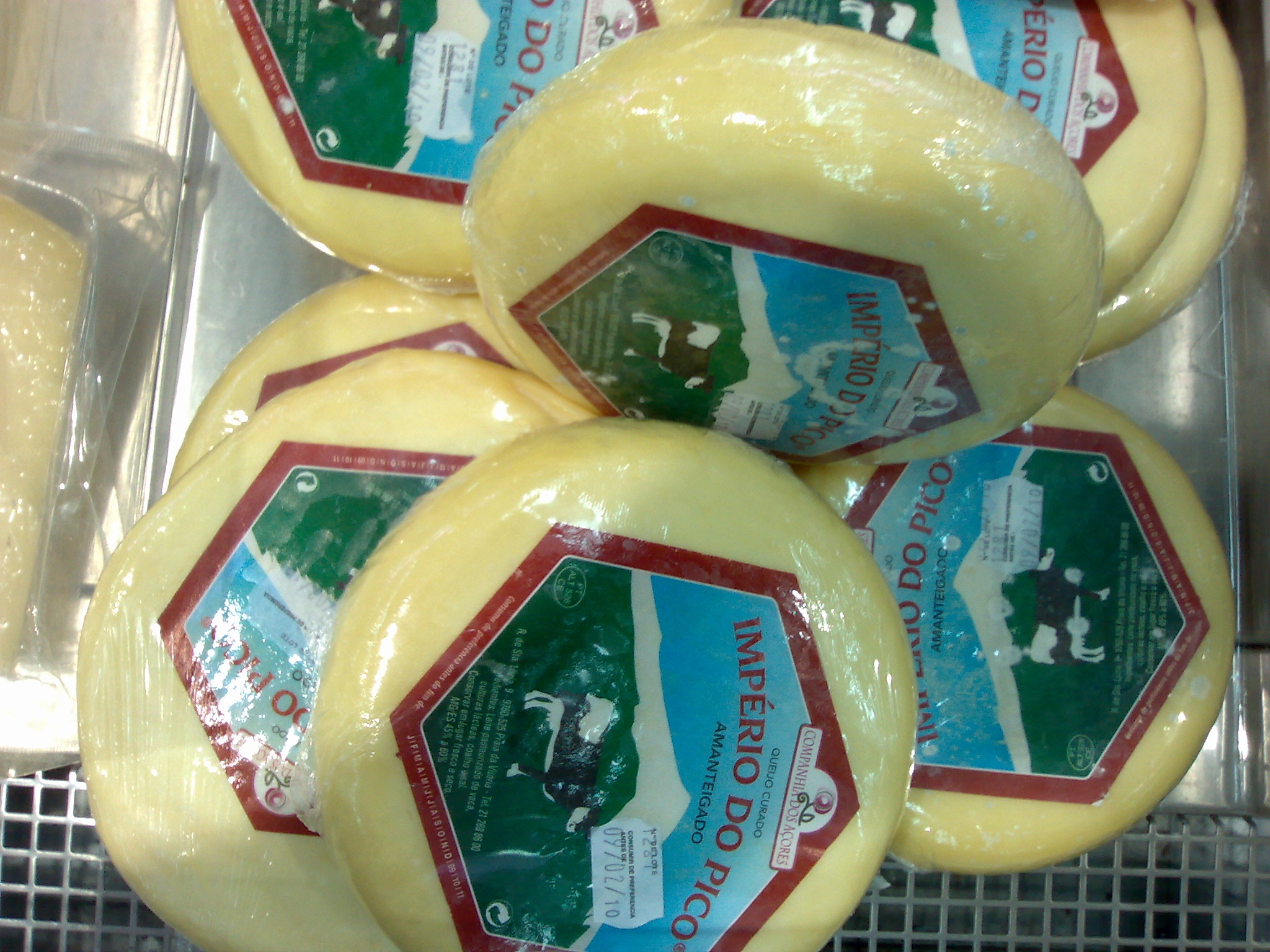
- Other names: Queijo do Pico
- Country of origin: Portugal
- Region: Azores
- Town: Lajes do Pico, Madalena, São Roque do Pico
- Source of milk: Cows
- Pasteurised: No
- Texture: Soft
- Fat content: 45-49
- Aging time: 20-30 days
- Certification: PDO October 1996
- Named after: Pico Island

Cheese of Pico (Portuguese: Queijo do Pico) is a cheese originating from the island of Pico in the Portuguese archipelago of the Azores. It has been classified as a "Denomination of Protected Origin", in accordance with the laws of the European Union since October 1996.

== History ==
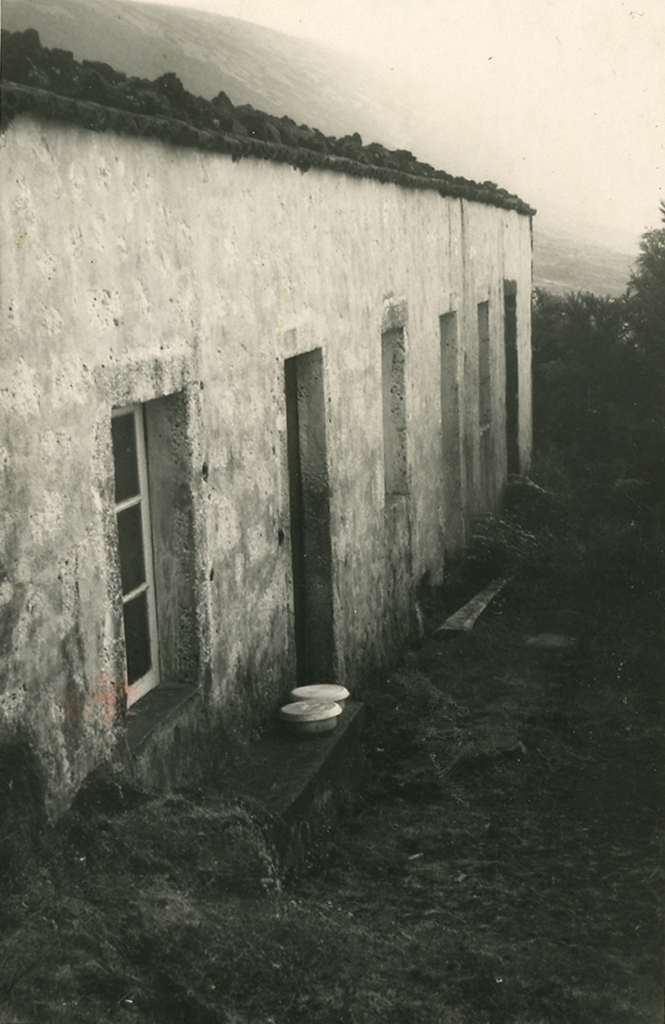
Fábrica de Queijo de Rafael Simas, in Santo Amaro, municipality of São Roque do Pico around 1947

It is unknown when Queijo do Pico was first made, but there are references to its fabrication dating as far back as the end of the 18th century; the manner of its preparation has been handed down to descendants since it was first cured.

== Characteristics ==
This cured cheese is produced from cow milk, from a slow curing process that takes 20 to 30 days. The cheese is produced in cylinders, in sizes ranging from 16 centimetres (6.3 in) to 17 cm (6.7 in) in diameter and heights of 2 cm (0.79 in) to 3 cm (1.2 in), while weights average 650 grams (1.43 lb) to 800 g (1.8 lb). Its fat content ranges from between 45% and 49%, and it is considered a fatty cheese. The ripening of the cheese forms a yellow exterior irregular crust and yellowish-white, soft and pasty interior. Pico cheese has a salty taste and a characteristically intense aroma.

== See also ==
- List of Portuguese cheeses with protected status
- List of cheeses
