= Convent of São Pedro de Alcântara (São Roque do Pico) =

- Convento de São Pedro de Alcântara
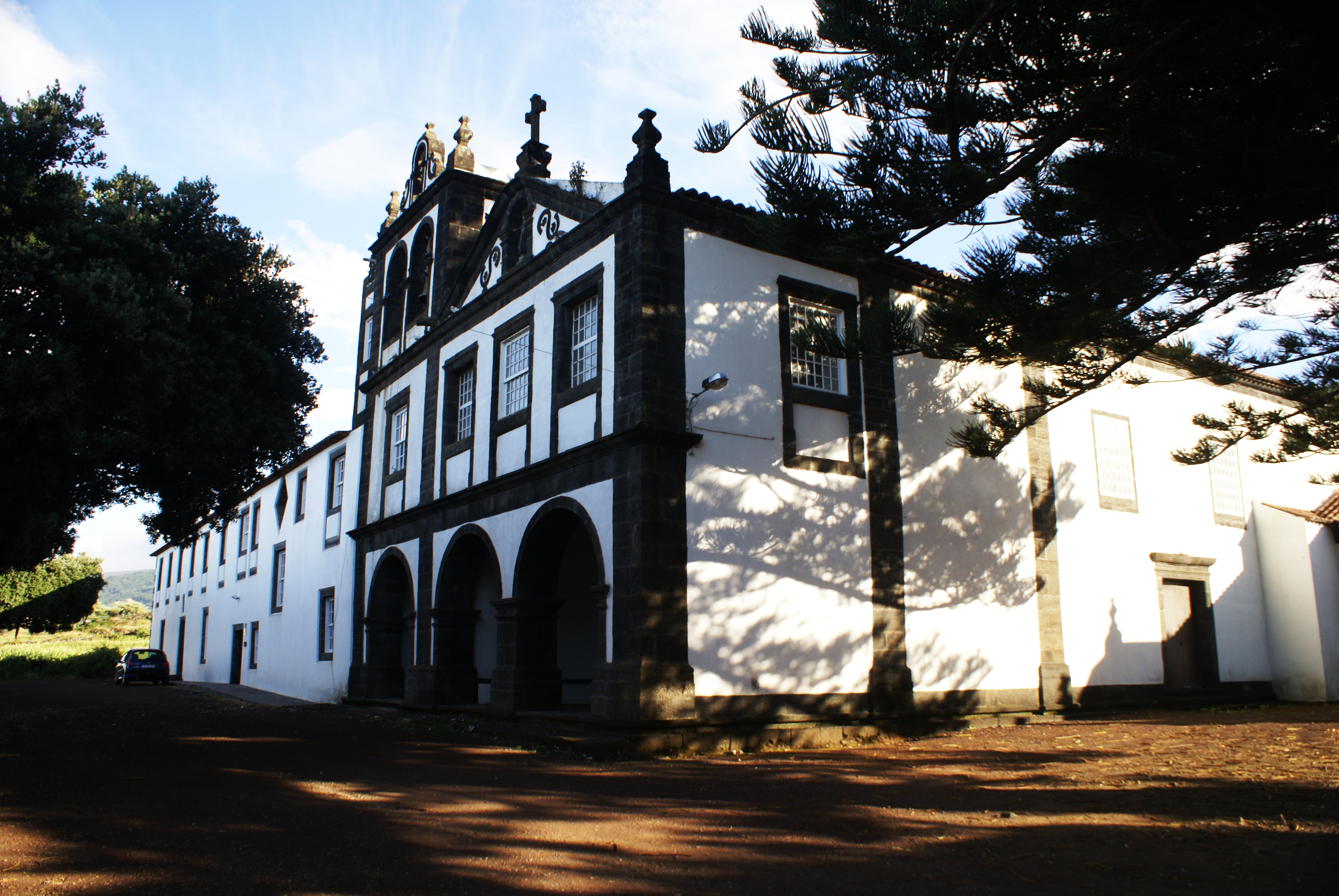
- The facade of the abandoned church and convent prior to its restoration in the beginning of the 21st century

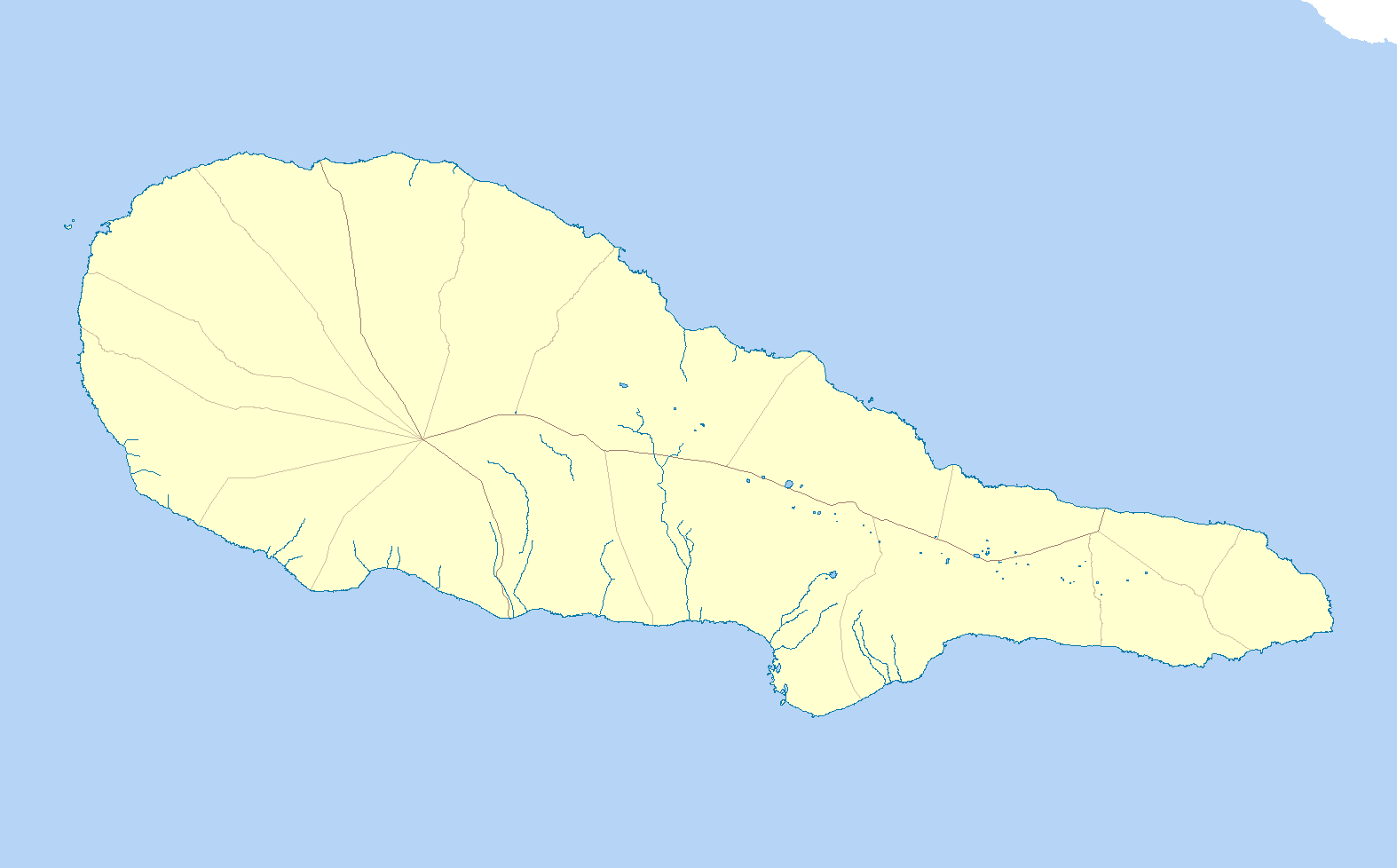
- Location within Pico

General information
- Type: Convent
- Architectural style: Baroque
- Location: São Roque, São Roque do Pico, Portugal
- Coordinates: 38°31′23.14″N 28°19′5.79″W
- Opened: 1658
- Owner: Portuguese Republic

Technical details
- Material: Stone

The Convent of São Pedro de Alcântara (Portuguese: Convento de São Pedro de Alcântara) is a Baroque convent and church complex in the civil parish of São Roque, in the municipality of the same name, in the Portuguese archipelago of the Azores.

== History ==
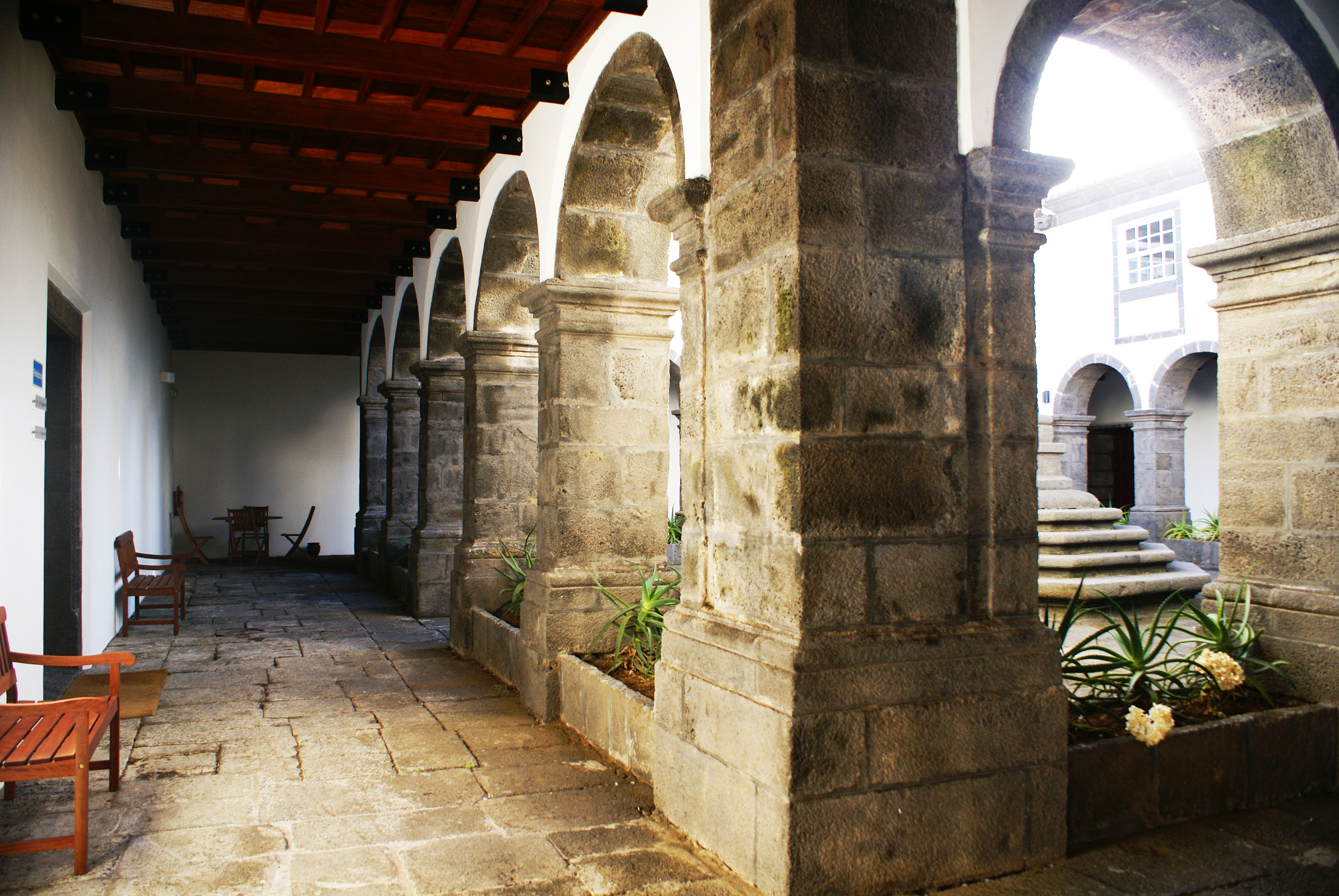
The arcade of the cloister fronting the internal patio

The construction of this complex resulted from a religious pledge of piety formulated during the middle of the 17th century, by a native of São Roque do Pico, Sebastião Ferreira Pimentel. In transit to Lisbon, the boat he was travelling on was attacked by pirates or privateers. In their panic, the crew and passengers saw their carrack enveloped by a dense cloud, and when Ferreira Pimentel affirmed that he saw in the rigging of the main mast a figure of a radiant female figure, of rare beauty, which protected them from harm. After the event, the parents of Ferreira Pimentel, Mr. Sebastião Ferreira de Melo and Mrs. Margarida Vieira, ordered the construction in 1658, a small hermitage to the invocation of Nossa Senhora do Livramento (Our Lady of Freedom/Release) in Cais do Pico.

Within a century, with the construction of the Convent of the Order of Friars Minor, or Franciscans under the authority of friar Inácio do Desterro absorbed the primitive structure. Eventually, the convent needed to shelter Franciscan friars from Lajes do Pico following the volcanic eruption of 1 February 1718, that occurred in the civil parish of Santa Luzia, and whose population fled to São Roque for assistance.

Silveira Macedo indicated that on 19 October 1721, the convent and later the church (Christmas 1724) were consumed by fire. Remodelling and reconstruction was only completed in 1726. The writings of friar Bartolomeu Ribeiro, around 1740, indicate that the population around São Roque had hardily grown in the intermediary.

After the forced extinction of religious orders, during the Liberal government, the monks left the convent, and the building began to serve the state in various forms, including prison, courts, finance offices, theatre and cinema, as well as cultural and sports associations and the municipal office buildings. Over time, it began to fall into ruin, with many of the internal spaces vandalized, windows and doors damaged, water infiltration through the roof and most of its artifacts transferred to expositions. It was finally classified as a Property of Public Interest under Decree 129/77, on 29 September 1977, but continued for several years to wait a budget to recuperate and restore its dependencies.

By 2010, the building was converted into living spaces, as a Youth Hostel (Portuguese: Pousada da Juventude), falling into the network of Pousadas da Juventude dos Açores.

== Architecture ==
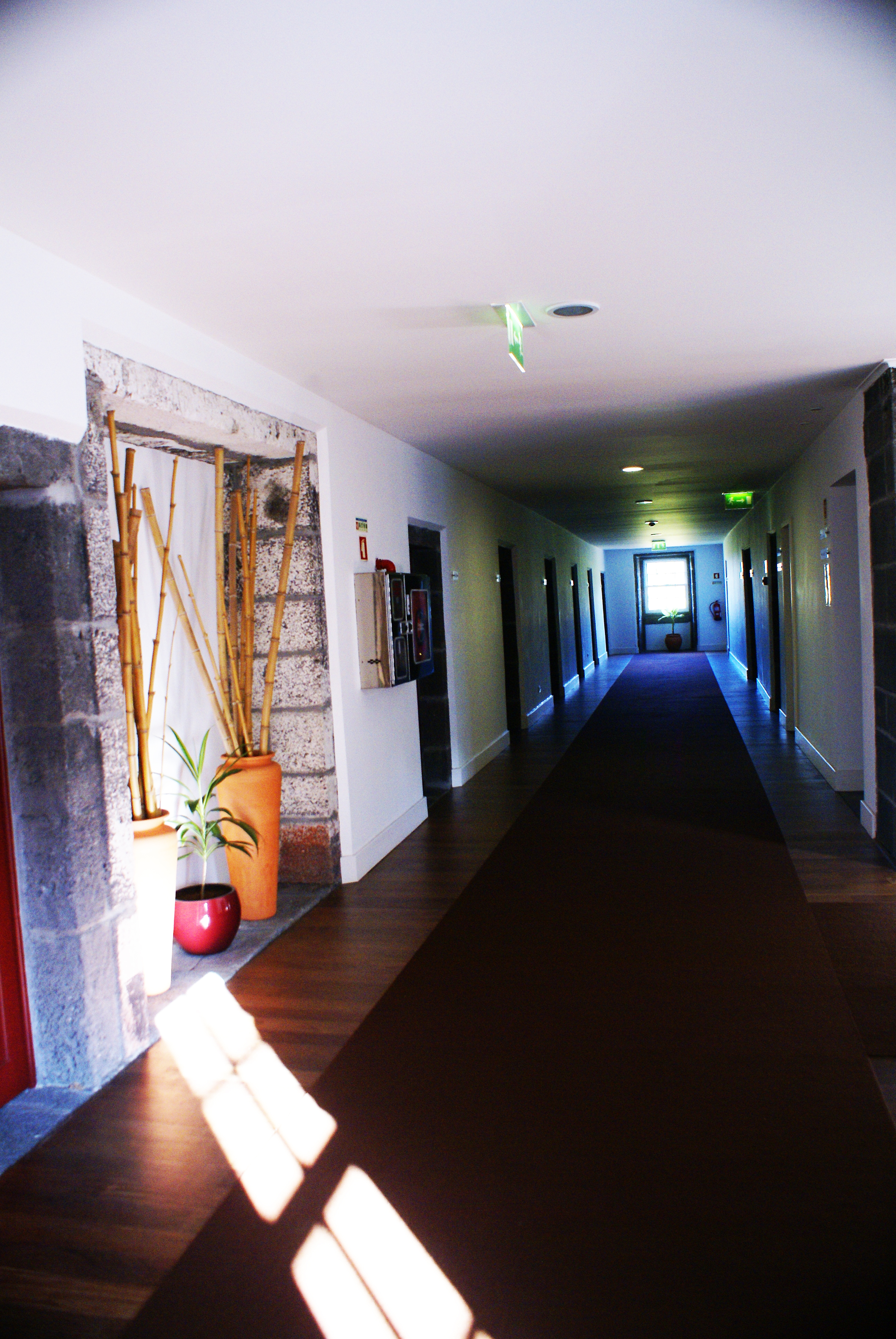
The interior of the remodelled Pousada da Juventude re-utilizing the ruined spaces of the monastic complex

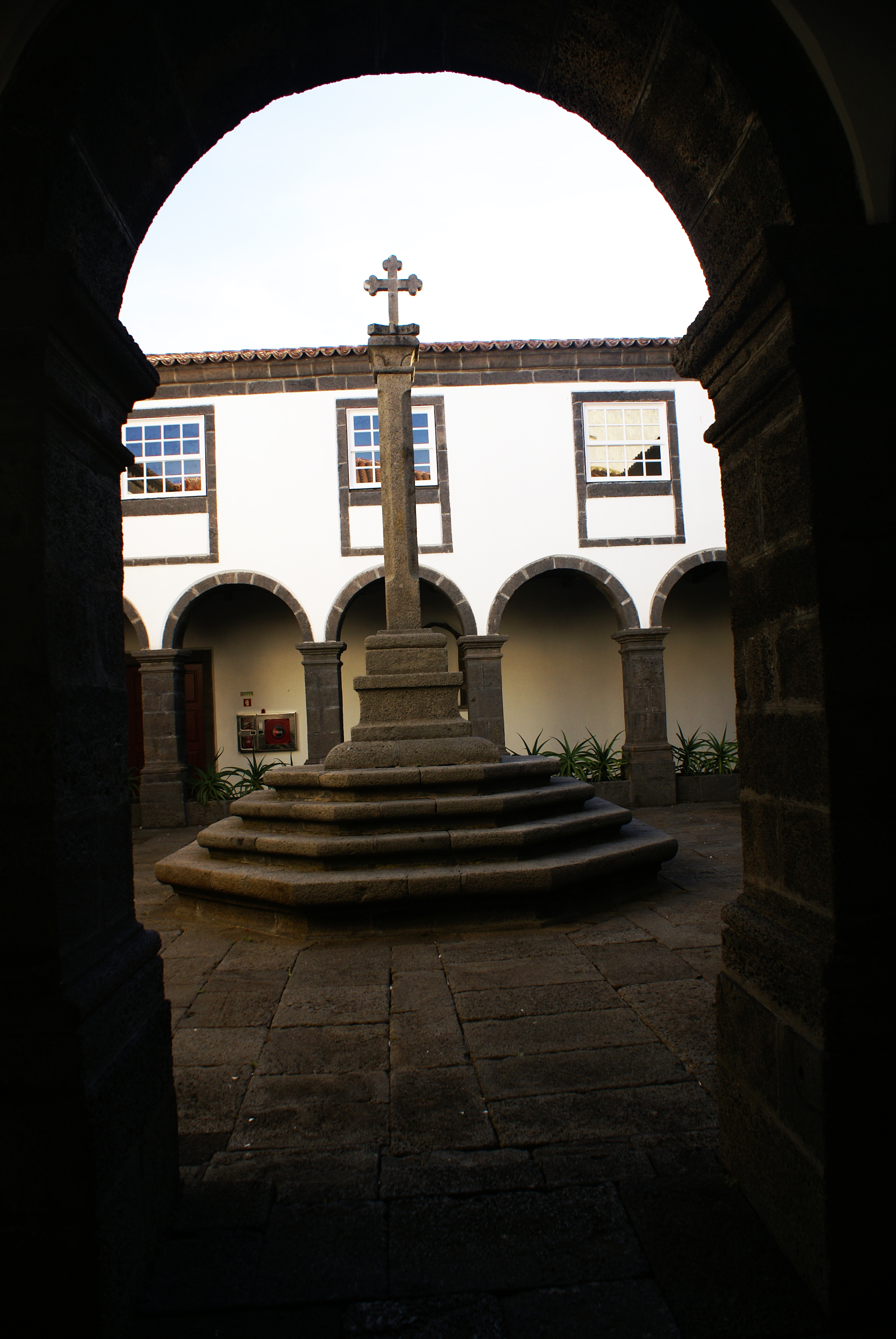
The cloister of the convent, with the multi-step cross-pillory

Over time, the convent and church has become embedded within the urban-rural landscape of the municipality of São Roque do Pico, accessible by Rua São João Bento de Lima. Within the grounds of the convent there are still vestiges of the original courtyard: to the front of the complex is a wall, cistern and access staircase to the former estate, situated on a lower elevation; to the rear of the convent there is still a worked, rectangular poço de maré, of great depths; and the grounds are landscaped by various trees (including Metrosideros and an Araucaria). Still on the grounds, is a more recent monument from the people of Pico dedicated to João Bento do Lima.

The monastic structure consists of a long two-story horizontal facade with a three-story church abutting its western wall, and adjacent bodies characteristic of its role as convent. Behind and hidden by the facade are the convents dependencies and cloister; in the building are still remnants of the ancient refectory, monks' cells and other installations. The kitchen, of grande dimensions, was completely destroyed.

The main floor of the church consists of three Roman Arches and doors (two to the interior of the church and one to the belfry) surmounted by four windows on the second register. The church structure is topped off by a bell-tower and triangular pediment with niche holding the image of Saint Francis of Assisi, and surmounted by a cross. The three storeys are separated by horizontal bands of stone, with the corners, frames, lateral limits, cornices, pilasters and pedestals finished in stone, while the walls are plastered and whitewashed.

=== Cloister ===
In the centre of its rectangular cloister is a Christian pillory, consisting of a pillar, pedestal and base with four steps in concentric circles. On either side of the cloister are five Roman arches, with the middle arch representing the passage to the cloister's patio. The arches and pillars are in worked stone, as is the pavement.

=== Church ===
The church has one nave with high choir and stacidia (choir stall), a pulpit, two lateral altars and presbytery all designed and completed in carved woods. The pulpit sits on a stone base and is carved in wood, with an overhanging wood decoration completed in gilded wood. Under the pulpit, are low relief carvings in stone with convent's heraldry. On the same wall as this pulpit are three confessionals with entrance from the cloister. The two lateral altars and presbytery are decorated in Baroque-era gilded wood, while the roofs consist of painted wood in vegetal designs. The walls of the prebystery present two grand panels of polychromatic azulejo tile, while a stone-worked baptismal fountain completes the utilitarian aspects of the church.

Although the church and convent are dedicated to São Pedro de Alcântara, the main altar displays an image of the Assumption of the Virgin, surrounded by a gilded wood decorations comparable to the Matriz Church of Horta, on which this was likely based. In the sacristy is a grande armorie constructed of Jacaranda wood imported from Brazil.
