= List of Azores Airlines destinations =

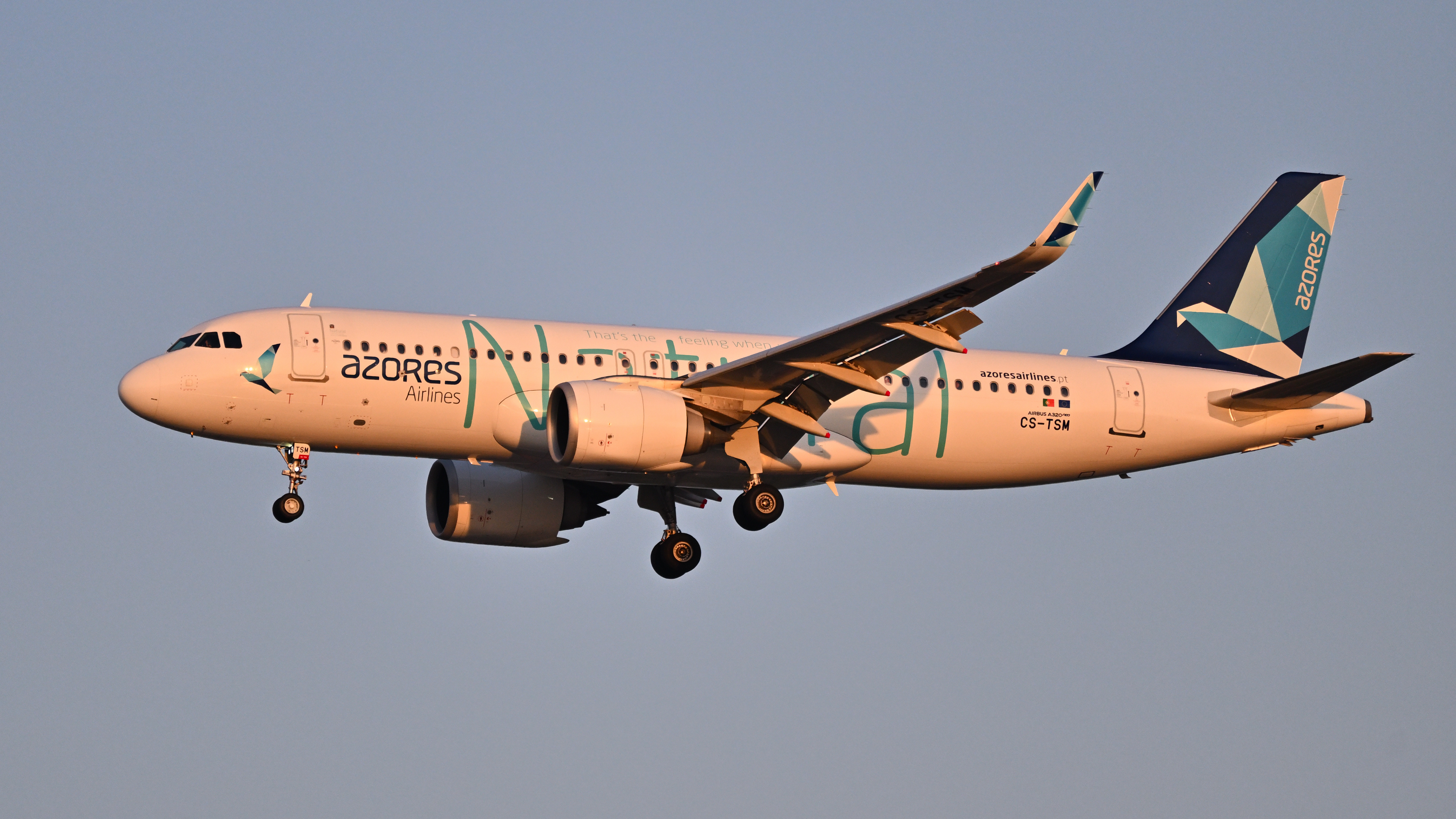
An Azores Airlines Airbus A320neo in the current blue livery layout

This is a list of airports currently and formerly served by the Portuguese airline Azores Airlines (formerly SATA Internacional) as of August 2026, and separately from the domestic operations of its parent company SATA Air Açores. The list includes destinations operated by charter in addition to regularly scheduled services.

== Destinations ==
Country	City or Island	Airport	Notes	Refs
Bermuda	Hamilton	L.F. Wade International Airport	Terminated	
Brazil	Salvador da Bahia	Salvador International Airport	Terminated	
Canada	Montreal	Montréal–Trudeau International Airport		
Canada	Toronto, Ontario	Toronto Pearson International Airport		
Cape Verde	Boa Vista	Aristides Pereira International Airport	Terminated	
Cape Verde	Praia	Nelson Mandela International Airport		
Cape Verde	Sal Island	Amílcar Cabral International Airport	Terminated	
Denmark	Billund	Billund Airport	Terminated	
Denmark	Copenhagen	Copenhagen Airport	Terminated	
Dominican Republic	Punta Cana	Punta Cana International Airport	Terminated	
France	Paris	Charles de Gaulle Airport	Seasonal	
France	Paris	Orly Airport	Terminated	
Germany	Düsseldorf	Düsseldorf Airport	Terminated	
Germany	Frankfurt	Frankfurt Airport	Seasonal	
Germany	Munich	Munich Airport	Terminated	
Ireland	Dublin	Dublin Airport	Terminated	
Isle of Man	Isle of Man	Isle of Man Airport	Terminated	
Italy	Milan	Milan Malpensa Airport	Terminated	
Jersey	Jersey	Jersey Airport	Terminated	
Mexico	Cancún	Cancún International Airport	Terminated	
Morocco	Oujda	Angads Airport	Terminated	
Netherlands	Amsterdam	Amsterdam Airport Schiphol	Terminated	
Norway	Oslo	Oslo Airport, Gardermoen	Terminated	
Portugal	Faro	Faro Airport		
Portugal	Funchal	Madeira Airport		
Portugal	Horta	Horta Airport		
Portugal	Lisbon	Lisbon Airport	Focus city	
Portugal	Pico Island	Pico Airport		
Portugal	Ponta Delgada	João Paulo II Airport	Base	
Portugal	Porto	Porto Airport		
Portugal	Santa Maria Island	Santa Maria Airport		
Portugal	Terceira	Lajes Airport		
Spain	Barcelona	Josep Tarradellas Barcelona–El Prat Airport	Seasonal	
Spain	Bilbao	Bilbao Airport	Terminated	
Spain	Gran Canaria	Gran Canaria Airport	Terminated	
Spain	Madrid	Adolfo Suárez Madrid–Barajas Airport	Terminated	
Sweden	Stockholm	Stockholm Arlanda Airport	Terminated	
Switzerland	Zürich	Zurich Airport	Terminated	
United Kingdom	Belfast	Belfast International Airport	Terminated	
United Kingdom	Cardiff	Cardiff Airport	Terminated	
United Kingdom	Exeter	Exeter Airport	Terminated	
United Kingdom	Kingston upon Hull	Humberside Airport	Terminated	
United Kingdom	London	Gatwick	Seasonal	
United Kingdom	London	Luton Airport	Terminated	
United Kingdom	Manchester	Manchester Airport	Terminated	
United Kingdom	Norwich	Norwich Airport	Terminated	
United States	Boston	Logan International Airport		
United States	New York City	John F. Kennedy International Airport		
United States	Oakland	Oakland International Airport	Terminated	
United States	Providence	T. F. Green Airport	Terminated	
