= PIX =

PIX can refer to:

- Cisco PIX, an IP firewall and NAT appliance
- PIX (Microsoft)
- PIX Publishing, a defunct photo bureau
- Pix (electronic payment system)
- Plan It X Records
- Sony PIX, Sony Pictures Entertainment's Hollywood movie channel in India
- Pico Airport
- WPIX, a television station in New York City known on air as "PIX 11"
- KPIX-TV, a television station in San Francisco

== See also ==
- PIIX
