= Bandeiras (Madalena) =

- Civil parish
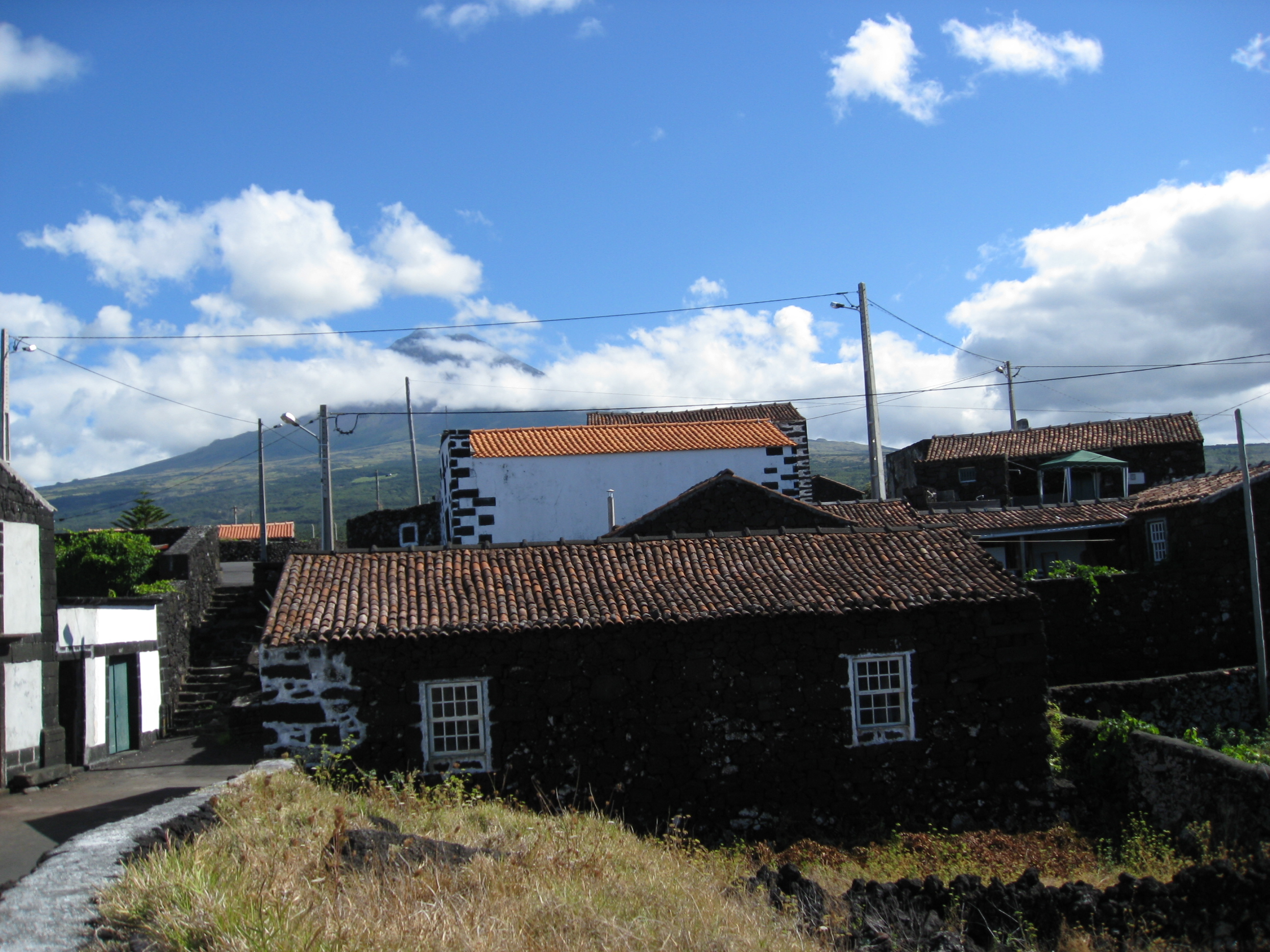

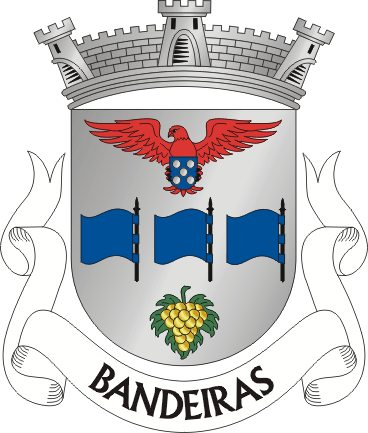
- Coat of arms

- Location of Bandeiras within the municipality of Madalena, Pico Island
- Coordinates: 38°32′25″N 28°27′54″W
- Country: Portugal
- Auton. region: Azores
- Island: Pico
- Municipality: Madalena

Area
  - Total: 22.21 km^{2} (8.58 sq mi)
- Elevation: 108 m (354 ft)

Population (2011)
  - Total: 626
  - Density: 28.2/km^{2} (73.0/sq mi)
- Time zone: UTC−01:00 (AZOT)
  - Summer (DST): UTC+00:00 (AZOST)
- Postal code: 9950-021
- Area code: 292
- Patron: Nossa Senhora da Boa Nova

Bandeiras (Portuguese for 'Flags') (pronounced [bɐ̃.ˈdɐj.ɾɐʃ]) is a civil parish in the municipality of Madalena on the island of Pico in the Azores. The population in 2011 was 626, in an area of 22.21 km².

== History ==
The parish is the home of the Island's first judiciary. The area was named "Bandeiras" after the magistrates' official flags raised on the site's many buildings ("bandeiras" is the plural form of "flag" in Portuguese).

The settlers initially focused on animal husbandry, agriculture and a fledgling winery, although some commerce and services developed concurrently. During the 18th and 19th centuries its viticulture expanded dramatically, owing to its micro-climate. The Church Matriz of Nossa Senhora da Boa Nova (English: "Our Lady of the Good Tidings"), a three-nave temple, was inaugurated in 1871. Today the church is in a state of disrepair, due to the July 9, 1988, earthquake that struck the island of Pico.

== Geography ==
The parish is located along the northwestern coast of the municipality and connected to the regional road that encircles the island. The area is relatively hilly along the coast, and gradually slopes towards the interior, where it reaches its peak (literally) in the stratovolcano of Pico. Its borders conform to an irregular pie-shaped wedge between the parishes of Madalena and Santa Luzia (in the municipality of São Roque do Pico); its widest portion is approximately 1.5 kilometres and about 5 kilometres long from the coast to Ponta do Pico. Most cultivatable lands are close to the roadways, and the community is predominantly rural. Forests dominate the mid-elevations, while scrub, mosses and smaller tree species are exist along the slopes of the mountain.

Although Bandeiras is primarily concentrated along the Regional Road ER.1-1ª, there are different agglomerations that comprise the settlement; Lajes, Bandeiras and Lajinhas follow the road, Cachorro, Portal da Fonte, Cais do Mourato and Baixio Pequeno skirt the coast, and north of the road the smaller hamlets of Gafeira or Farrobo are mostly abandoned.

Bandeiras, together with Santa Luzia, is the site of Pico Airport.

== Architecture ==
=== Religious ===
- Church of Nossa Senhora da Boa Nova (English: Our Lady of the Good Tidings) - located in the main community of Bandeiras, along the regional roadway, east of Cabeço Chão; it dates back to the early 19th century.
- Chapel of Nossa Senhora dos Milagres (English: Our Lady of Miracles) - located in Cachorro
- Chapel of Nossa Senhora do Desterro (English: Our Lady of Exile) - located in Cais do Mourato
- Chapel of São Caetano

== Culture ==
=== Festivities ===
A two-day festival is celebrated at the Church on September 8 every year. The chapel of Nossa Senhora dos Milagres, located in the coastal settlement of Cachorro, the chapel of Nossa Senhora do Desterro, near Cais do Mourato, and the chapel of São Caetano also hold festivals throughout the year. Bandeiras is also noted for its annual Festival of Portuguese Folklore, which takes place in the Salão do Povo and Sports Park every June 10.
