= Hermitage of São Vicente (São Roque do Pico) =

Early settlement hermitage in the locality of São Vicente, in the Azores

- Ermida de São Vicente
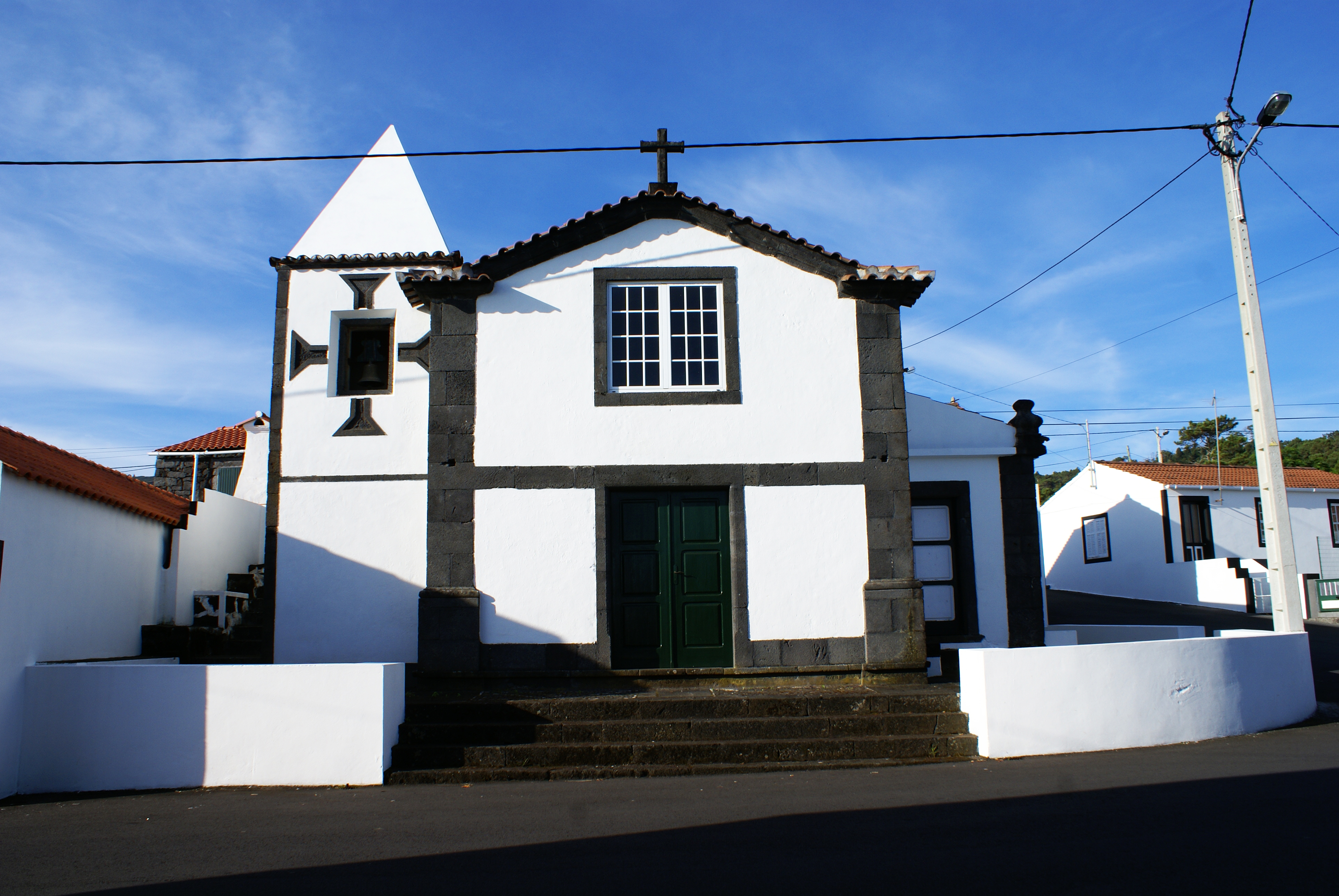
- The front facade of the hermitage of São Vicente, showing its iconic belfry

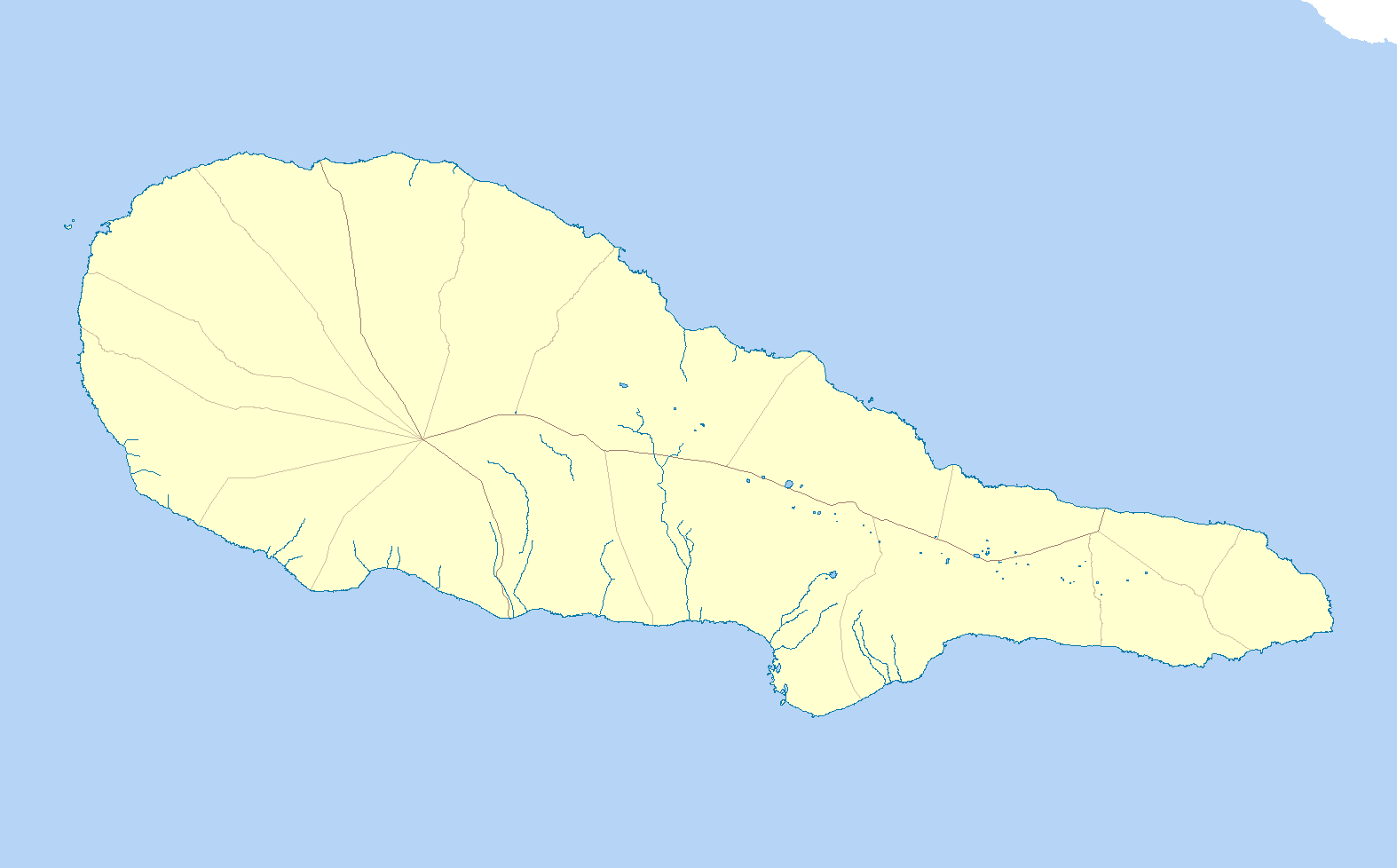
- Location within Pico

General information
- Type: Hermitage
- Architectural style: Baroque
- Location: Santo António, São Roque do Pico, Portugal
- Coordinates: 38°32′26.07″N 28°21′12.83″W
- Opened: 1746
- Owner: Portuguese Republic

Technical details
- Material: Brick Masonry

The Hermitage of São Vicente (Portuguese: Ermida de São Vicente) is an early settlement hermitage in the locality of São Vicente, civil parish of Santo António, in the Portuguese municipality of São Roque do Pico, on the Portuguese island of Pico, in the archipelago of the Azores.

== History ==
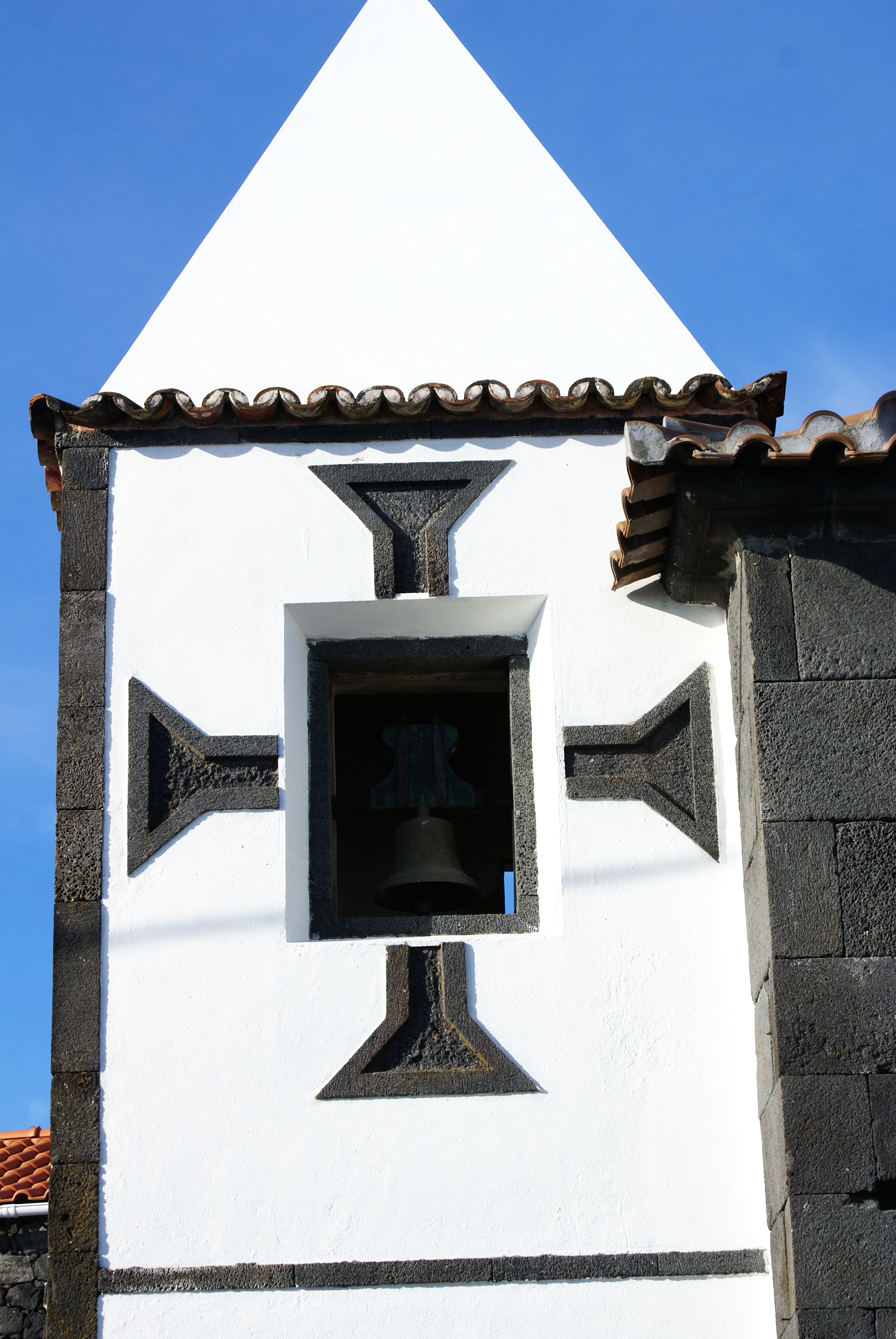
The detail of the belfry of the hermitage showing the cross of the Order of Christ

The first reference to this religious temple was attributed to Father João José de Melo, then vicar and confessor for the municipality of São Roque, between 1768 and 1783. As he indicated, it was erected in his birthplace, and dedicated to the locality's principal patron saint (Vincent of Saragossa), in 1746.

The little hermitage's main nave was expanded and a sacristy added around 1967, while the presbytery was constructed new during the same public work. This expansion also allowed the construction of a choir (until then undeveloped), and allowed the addition of a belfry to its facade. As these projects continued, the religious administration acquired an image of the Immaculate Heart of Mary, while a crown was given as a gift for the same image.

Owing to its relatively recent construction, during the 1973 earthquake, many of the local population sought refuge in the temple. A festival in honour of the patron saint is celebrated on the middle Sunday of July of each year.

== Architecture ==
The temple is in a semi-rural landscape between various small residences, and consists of a single-nave church with belfry. Its frontispiece is a triangular pediment and belies its original smaller design, which was systematically enlarged to support its small congregations.

The hermitage is distinguished by its lateral belfry, whose belltower is marked by a sculpted Order of Christ-like cross over a square opening and topped by a triangular roof.
