= São Roque do Pico (parish) =

- Civil parish
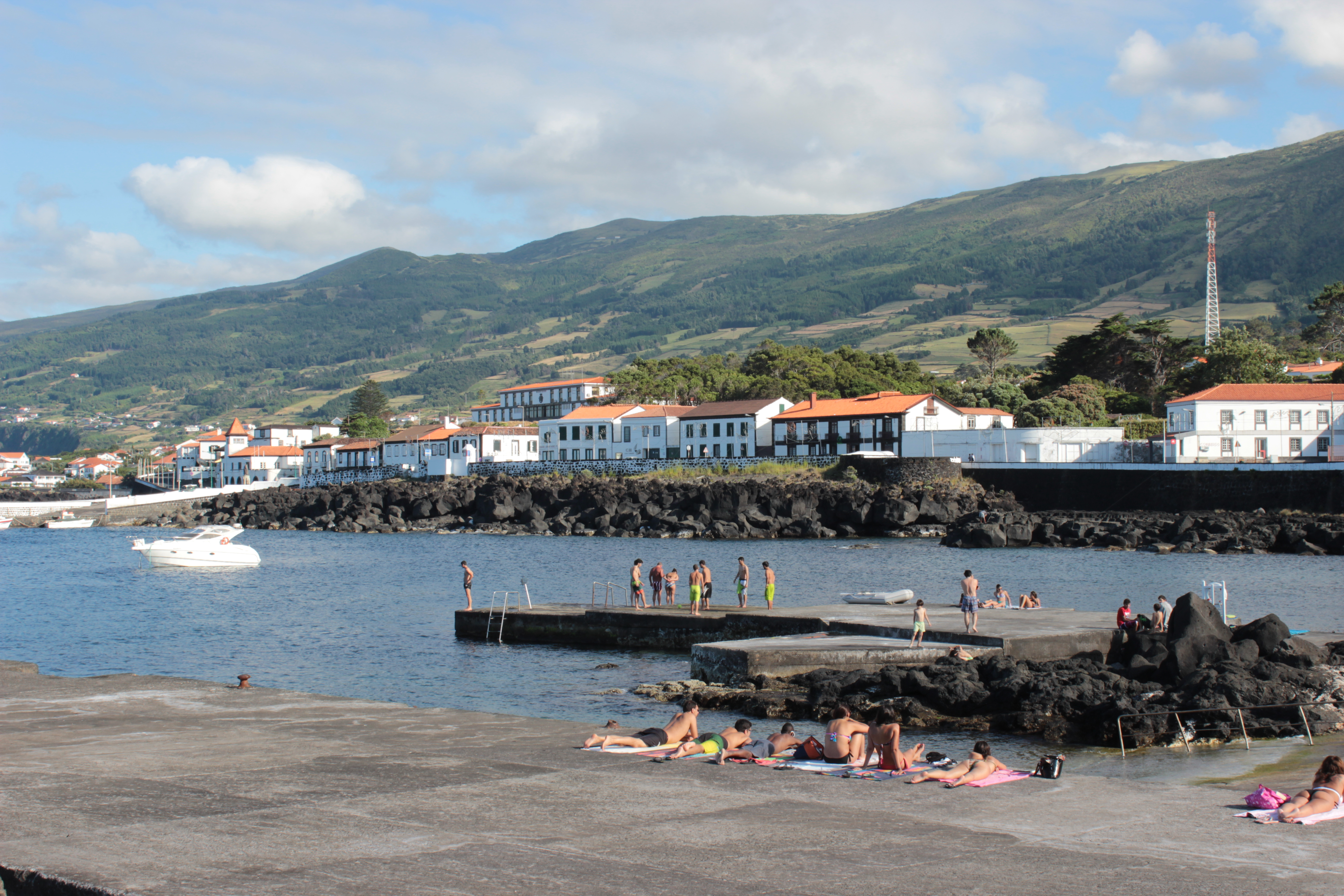
- A view of the area of Cais do Pico in the civil parish of São Roque do Pico

- Coordinates: 38°30′59″N 28°18′50″W
- Country: Portugal
- Auton. region: Azores
- Island: Pico
- Municipality: São Roque do Pico

Area
  - Total: 42.23 km^{2} (16.31 sq mi)

Population (2011)
  - Total: 1,316
  - Density: 31.16/km^{2} (80.71/sq mi)
- Time zone: UTC−01:00 (AZOT)
  - Summer (DST): UTC+00:00 (AZOST)
- Postal code: 9940-353
- Area code: 292
- Patron: São Roque

São Roque do Pico (Portuguese pronunciation: [sɐ̃w ˈʁɔkɨ ðu ˈpiku]) is a civil parish in the municipality of São Roque do Pico, in the Portuguese archipelago of the Azores. The population in 2011 was 1,316, in an area of 42.23 km².

== History ==
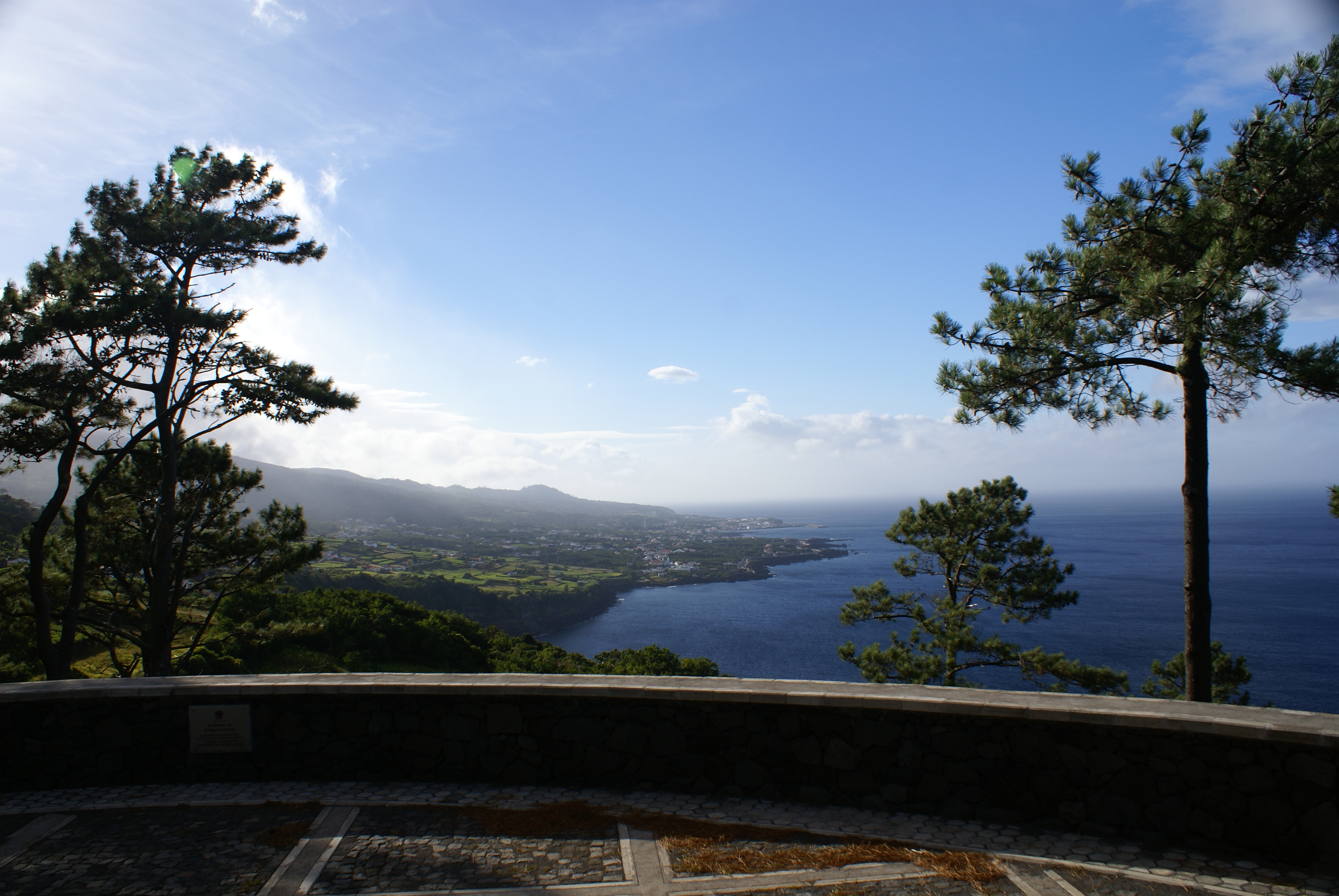
View of São Roque from Prainha Forest Park

The parish's name came from its ecclesiastical association with its patron saint, Saint Roch, and owing the number of São Roques in Portugal (not just at the local but also national level), the suffix do Pico was used to distinguish the locality. Locally, the local name has been reduced to São Roque, while at the municipal level, São Roque do Pico is identified with the municipality.

The first attempt to settle the island of Pico, around 1460, came from settlers from northern Portugal. After a stay on Terceira and Graciosa, these settlers migrated with the first Captain-Donatary Álvaro de Ornelas. Pico was then at part of the Captaincy of Faial. One of the principal economic and demographic factors in the development of São Roque came from the zone known as Cais do Pico. Literally, the port of Pico, Cais was a portage for annual ships, that travelled the central group of Azorean islands. This early transit, though, resulted in a large settlement, resulting in the elevation of the district to the status of vila (town) in 1542.

Whaling, which dates back to the 19th century, in which the artesnal hunt (with harpoons and lances) was introduced into the region, primarily by a sedentary population from many of the out-ports. This activity occupied a large part of the activities of local men, from fragile boats and open to the winds, against large sea mammals. The last factory dedicated to the processing of whale meat and blubber was transformed into a museum (Museu da Indústria Baleeira): a monument to the men of this industry was inaugurated on 27 July 2000.

== Economy ==
The principal activities of the parish include agriculture and herding, and the processing associated with these products. In the last decades of the 20th century, there has been an evolution towards commerce, services and tourist-related activities.

== Architecture ==
In addition to many of the buildings used in the whaling industry, the local patrimony includes the 18th century parochial church, the similarly dated Baroque Convent of São Pedro de Alcântara, and the hermitage dedicated to the archangel Michael São Miguel Arcanjo), in addition to various mills and cellars, that dot the landscape.
