= Pico Airport =

Pico Airport Aeroporto do Pico
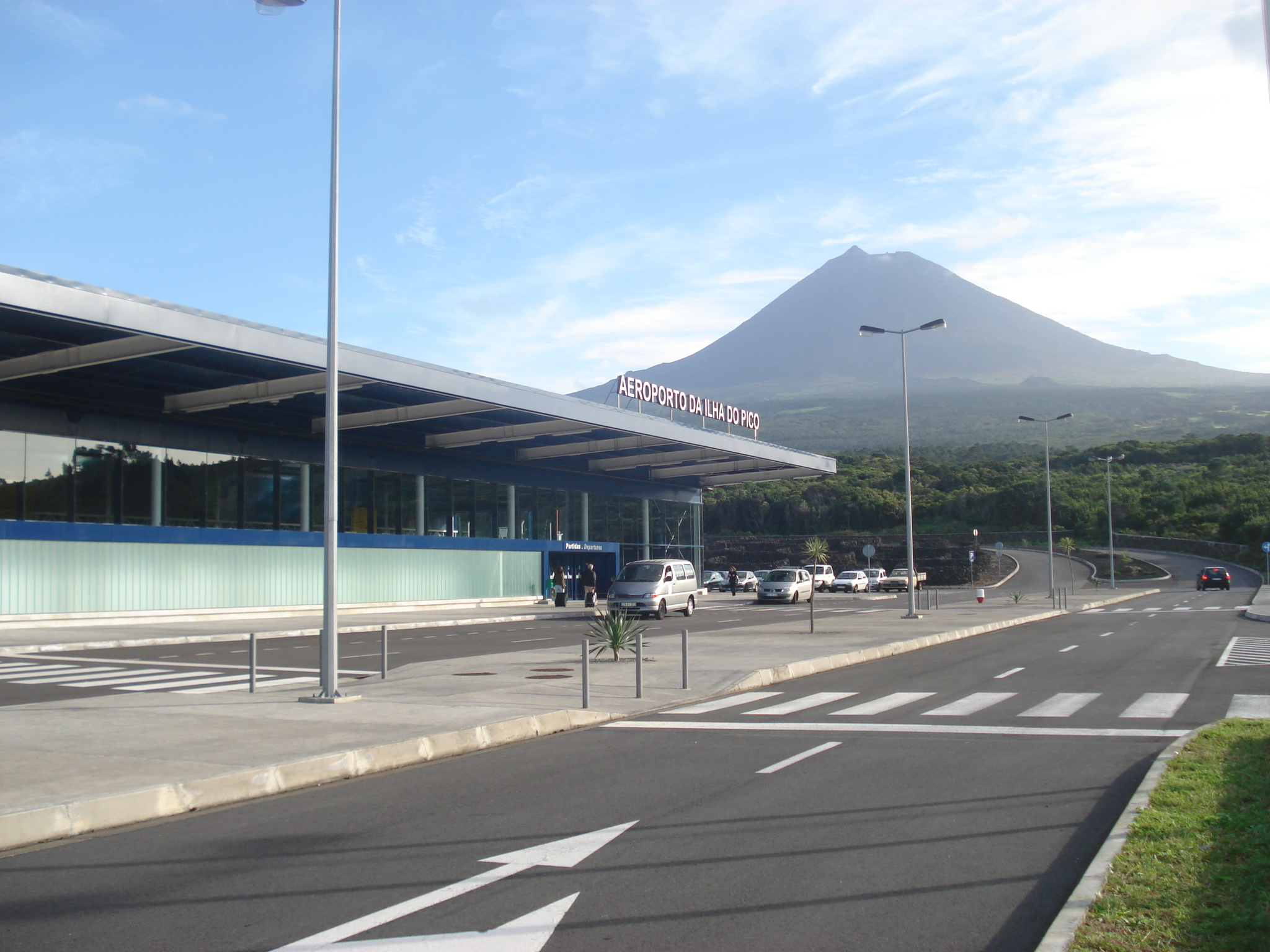
- IATA: PIX; ICAO: LPPI

Summary
- Airport type: Public
- Operator: SATA Aérodromos
- Location: Pico Island
- Elevation AMSL: 34 m / 112 ft
- Coordinates: 38°33′16″N 028°26′29″W

Map
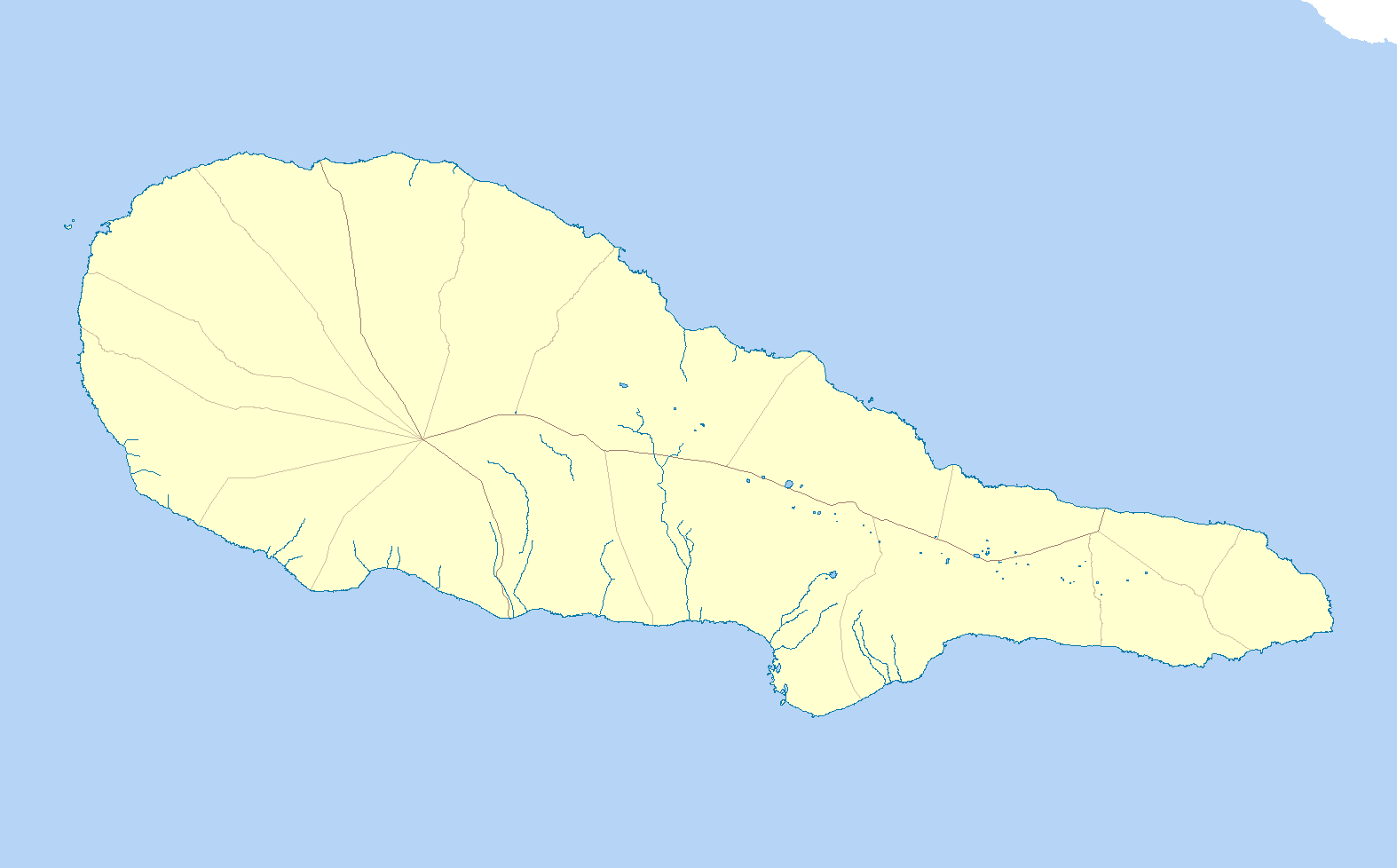
- Location in the Azores LPPI (Pico)

Runways
| Direction | Length | | Surface |
| Direction | m | ft | Surface |
|---|---|---|---|
| 09/27 | 1,745 | 5,725 | Asphalt |
- Source: Portuguese AIP

Pico Airport (Portuguese: Aeroporto do Pico) (IATA: PIX, ICAO: LPPI) is an airport located 8 km (5.0 mi) from Madalena on the Portuguese island of Pico in the archipelago of the Azores.

== History ==
The first studies were completed to construct a runway for the remote island of Pico during the post-War era when, instead, a final decision in 1946 saw the construction of an aerodrome on the island of Faial. It was only on 5 May 1976, when the construction of a runway and terminal building began on the island of Pico, under the initiative of the Portuguese army, but completed under the administration of the Regional Government of the Azores.

The runway was inaugurated on 25 April 1982: at the time the runway was only 1,200 metres (3,900 ft) long, with limited capabilities for large aircraft. This infrastructure was constructed in a morphological area that only permitted its construction oriented east to west, making it susceptible to dominant southerly winds, raising questions as to its original construction.

In 1990, with the arrival of new ATP aircraft for SATA Air Açores' fleet, the decision was taken to extend the runway, to improve operations with this type of aircraft. With the completion of this extension, the runway reached a 1,520 metres (4,990 ft) length and widened to 30 metres (98 ft). A dozen years later, the runway was once again extended in order to support future medium-size jet or turboprop aircraft: at its inauguration the new runway extended to 1,745 metres (5,725 ft), a new terminal building was concluded with parking area, new control tower, first aid station and firefighting centers, in addition to new cargo warehouse.

In April 2005, Pico received its first direct flight from Lisbon. The airport had regular connections with Lisbon via TAP Portugal (til 2015) and Azores Airlines (from 2015 and as of today) and inter-island flights to other islands: in 2008, SATA Air Açores was responsible for movement of 58,000 passengers from the airport.

== Geography ==
The airport on Pico is situated 8 kilometres (5.0 mi) from the urban center of Madalena, at an altitude of 34 metres (112 ft) above sea level. It is divided between the two civil parishes of Bandeiras and Santa Luzia on the northern coast of the island, located along the regional E.R.1-1ª roadway between Madalena and São Roque do Pico.

Managed by SATA Gestão de Aeródromos, it has an 1,745 metres (5,725 ft) operational runway (oriented 09/27), with a width of 45 metres (148 ft). The runway is illuminated and can handle evening flight operations (although rare), using VFR or IFR flight rules, while approximation instruments are based on PI locators. The installation of an ILS system was adjudicated around 2010.

== Airlines and destinations ==
The following airlines operate regular scheduled and charter flights at Pico Airport:

| Airlines | Destinations |
|---|---|
| Azores Airlines | Lisbon |
| SATA Air Açores | Ponta Delgada, Terceira |

== See also ==
- Aviation in the Azores
