= Santa Luzia (São Roque do Pico) =

- Civil parish
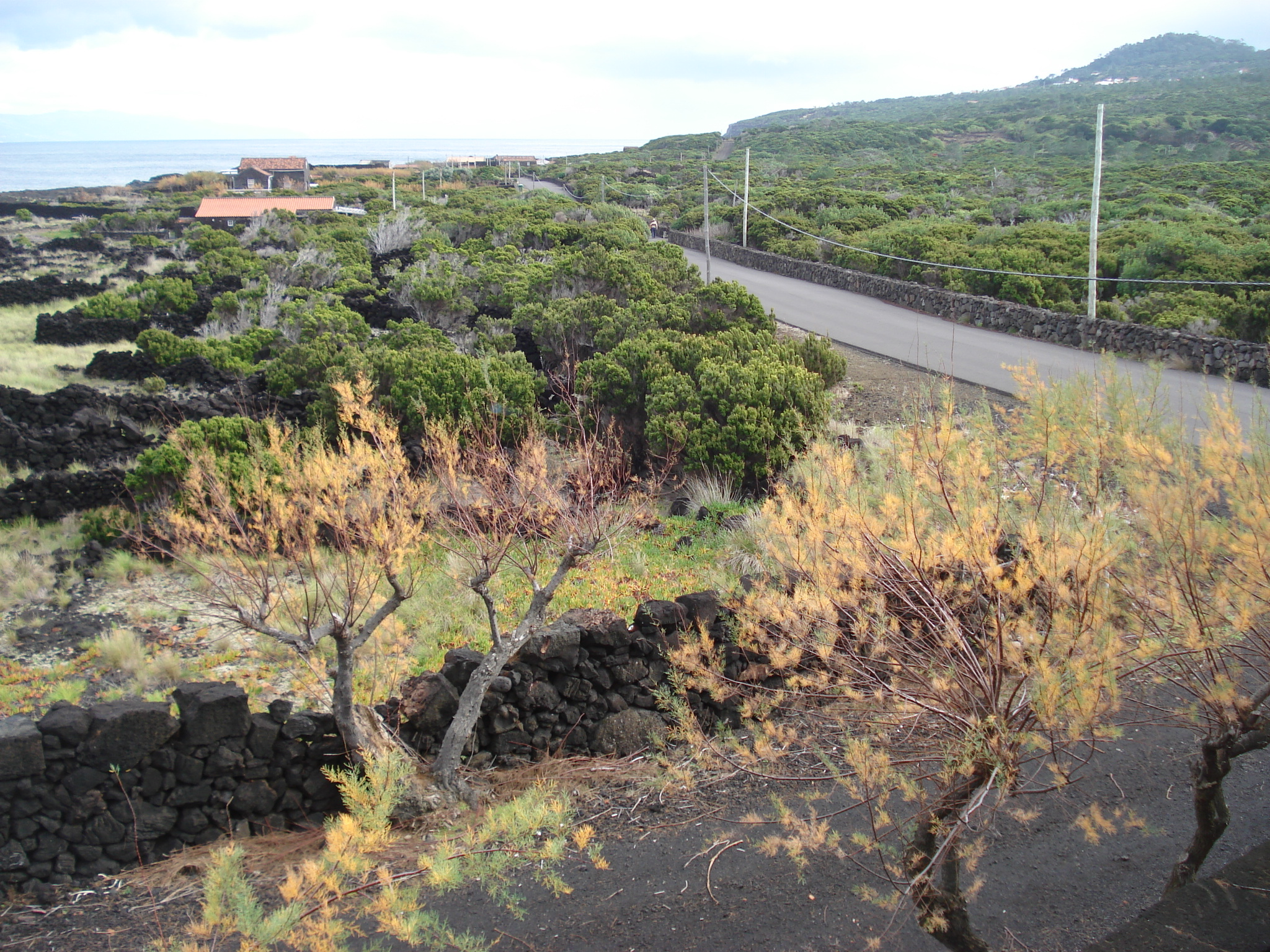
- Coastal landscape around Arcos, in the parish of Santa Luzia, Pico Island

- Location of Santa Luzia within the municipality of São Roque do Pico, Pico Island
- Coordinates: 38°32′46″N 28°24′0″W
- Country: Portugal
- Auton. region: Azores
- Island: Pico
- Municipality: São Roque do Pico

Area
  - Total: 30.13 km^{2} (11.63 sq mi)
- Elevation: 127 m (417 ft)

Population (2011)
  - Total: 422
  - Density: 14.0/km^{2} (36.3/sq mi)
- Time zone: UTC−01:00 (AZOT)
  - Summer (DST): UTC+00:00 (AZOST)
- Postal code: 9940-125
- Area code: 292
- Patron: Santa Luzia

Santa Luzia (Portuguese for Saint Lucia) is a civil parish in the municipality of São Roque do Pico in the Azores. The population in 2011 was 422, in an area of 30.13 km^{2}. It is the northernmost parish on the island. The Pico Airport is in this parish and neighbouring Bandeiras to the west in the municipality of Madalena. It contains the localities Arcos, Canto do Mistério, Fetais, Lajido, Lajido do Meio, Meio Mundo, Miraguaia, Ponta da Baixa, Ponta Negra, Rua de Cima and Santa Luzia.

== Geography ==
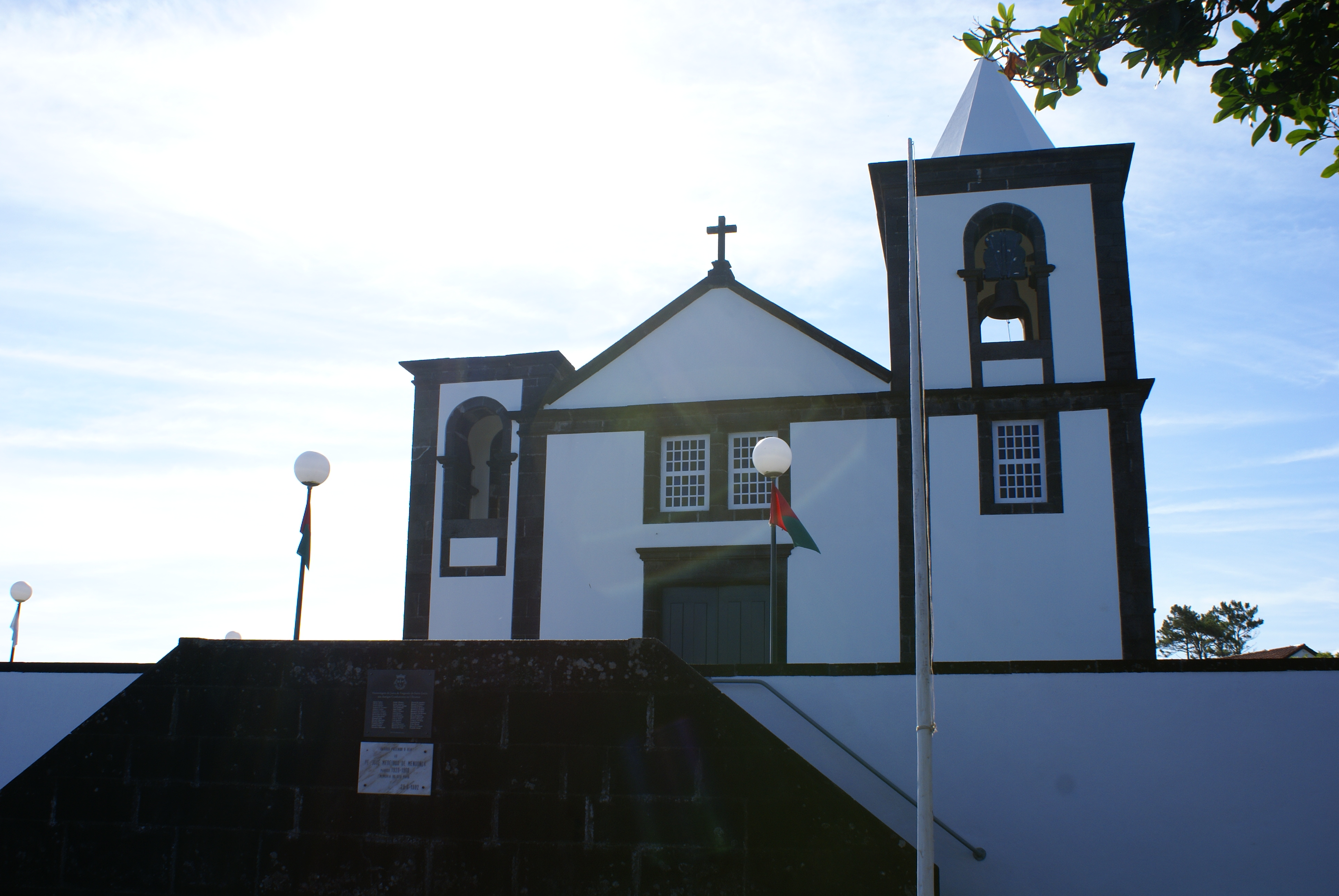
The front facade of the Church of Santa Luzia, in the centre of the community

Santa Luzia is located on the northern coast of the island and is connected by the road encircling the island to its neighbors: Bandeiras in the west, and Santo António in the east. The area is relatively hilly and gradually slopes into the interior, reaching its peak (literally) in the Ponta do Pico.
