= Santo Amaro (São Roque do Pico) =

- Civil parish
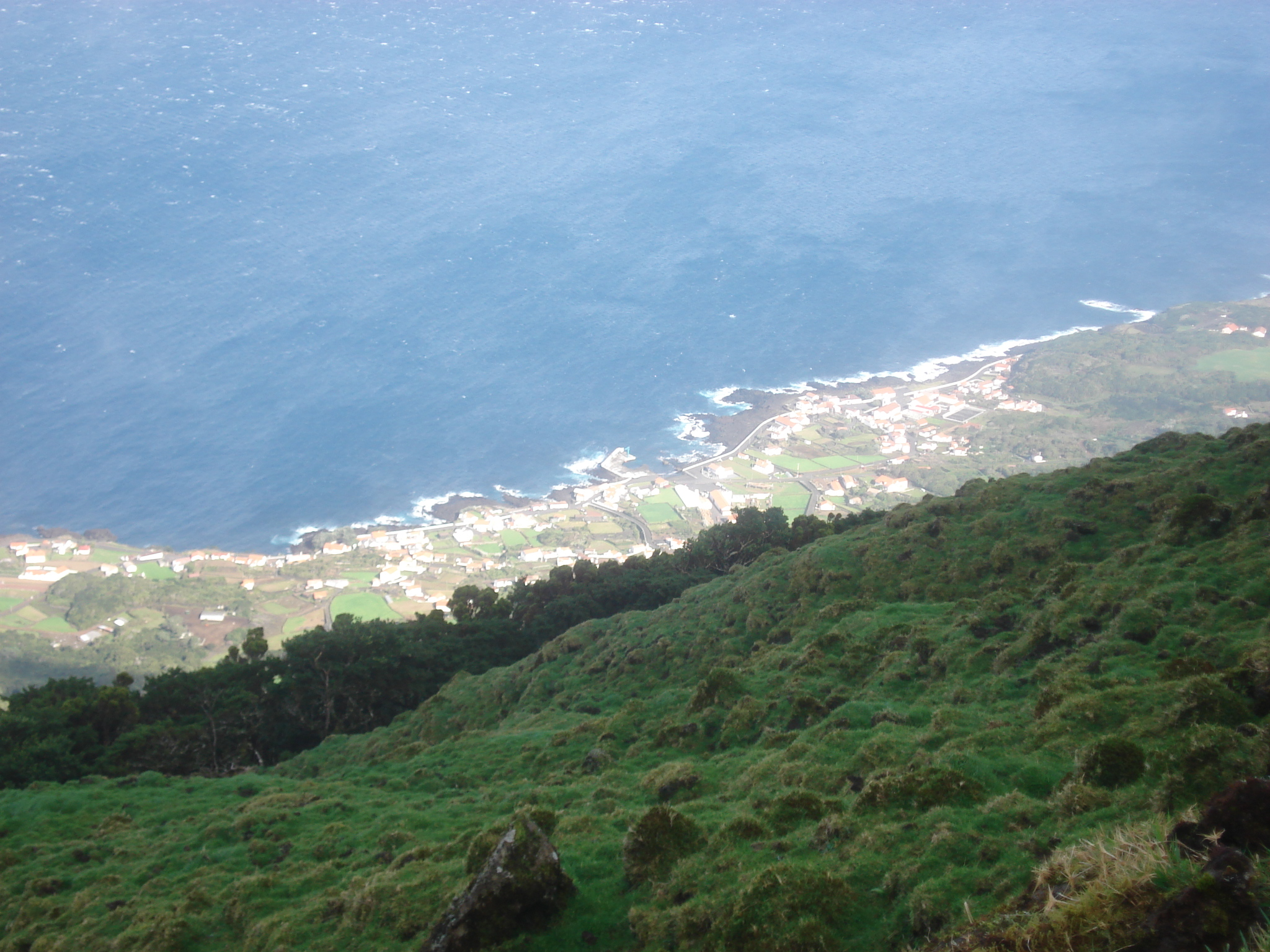
- The coastal portion of Santo Amaro village, seen from the Achada Plain near Chã do Pelado

- Location of Santo Amaro within the municipality of São Roque do Pico, Pico Island
- Coordinates: 38°27′16″N 28°10′14″W
- Country: Portugal
- Auton. region: Azores
- Island: Pico
- Municipality: São Roque do Pico

Area
  - Total: 11.86 km^{2} (4.58 sq mi)
- Elevation: 34 m (112 ft)

Population (2021)
  - Total: 255
  - Density: 21.5/km^{2} (55.7/sq mi)
- Time zone: UTC−01:00 (AZOT)
  - Summer (DST): UTC+00:00 (AZOST)
- Postal code: 9940-040
- Area code: (+351) 292 XXX-XXXX
- Patron: Santo Amaro

Santo Amaro is a civil parish on the northern coast of the island of Pico, in the eastern part of the municipality of São Roque do Pico in the Azores, Portugal. It has 255 inhabitants in an area of 11.86 km^{2}. It is the least populated parish in the municipality. It contains the localities Debaixo da Rocha, Ponta de João Salino, Portinho, Santo Amaro and Terra Alta.
