= John Paul II Ponta Delgada Airport =

Airport near Ponta Delgada

John Paul II Ponta Delgada Airport Aeroporto João Paulo II

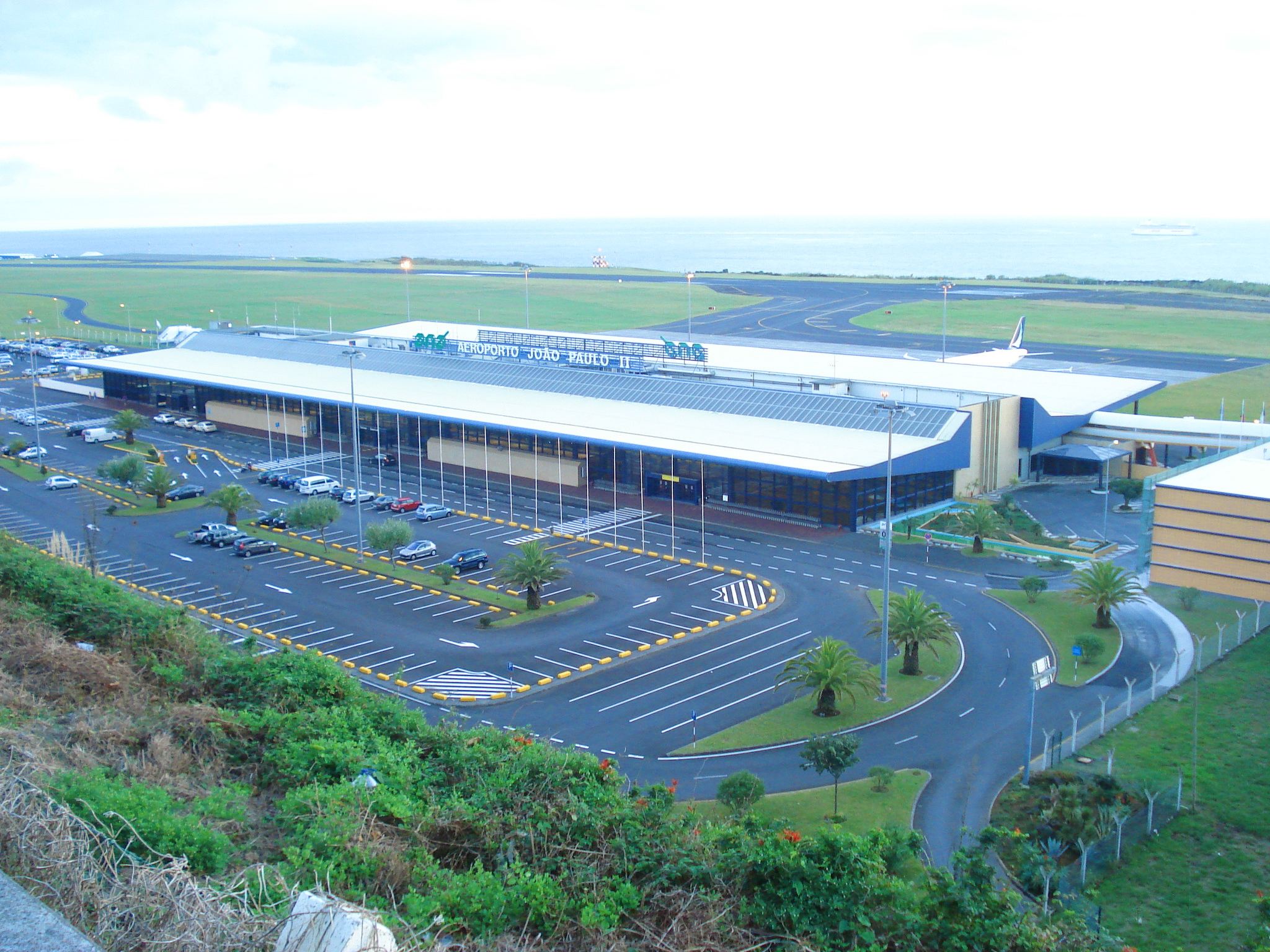
- IATA: PDL; ICAO: LPPD

Summary
- Airport type: Public
- Owner: Vinci Group
- Operator: ANA Aeroportos de Portugal
- Serves: Ponta Delgada
- Location: Relva
- Elevation AMSL: 79 m (259 ft)
- Coordinates: 37°44′28″N 25°41′52″W
- Website: ana.pt

Map
- Location of Ponta Delgada-Joao Paulo II in the archipelago of the Azores LPPD (North Atlantic)

Runways
Direction	Length		Surface
Direction	m	ft	Surface
12/30	2,497	8,192	Asphalt

Statistics (2024)
- Passengers: 3,285,000
- Passengers change 23-24: ▲9.7%
- Aircraft movements: 37,195
- Movements change 23-24: ▲5.9%
- Sources: ANAC, Portuguese AIP; ANA Vinci

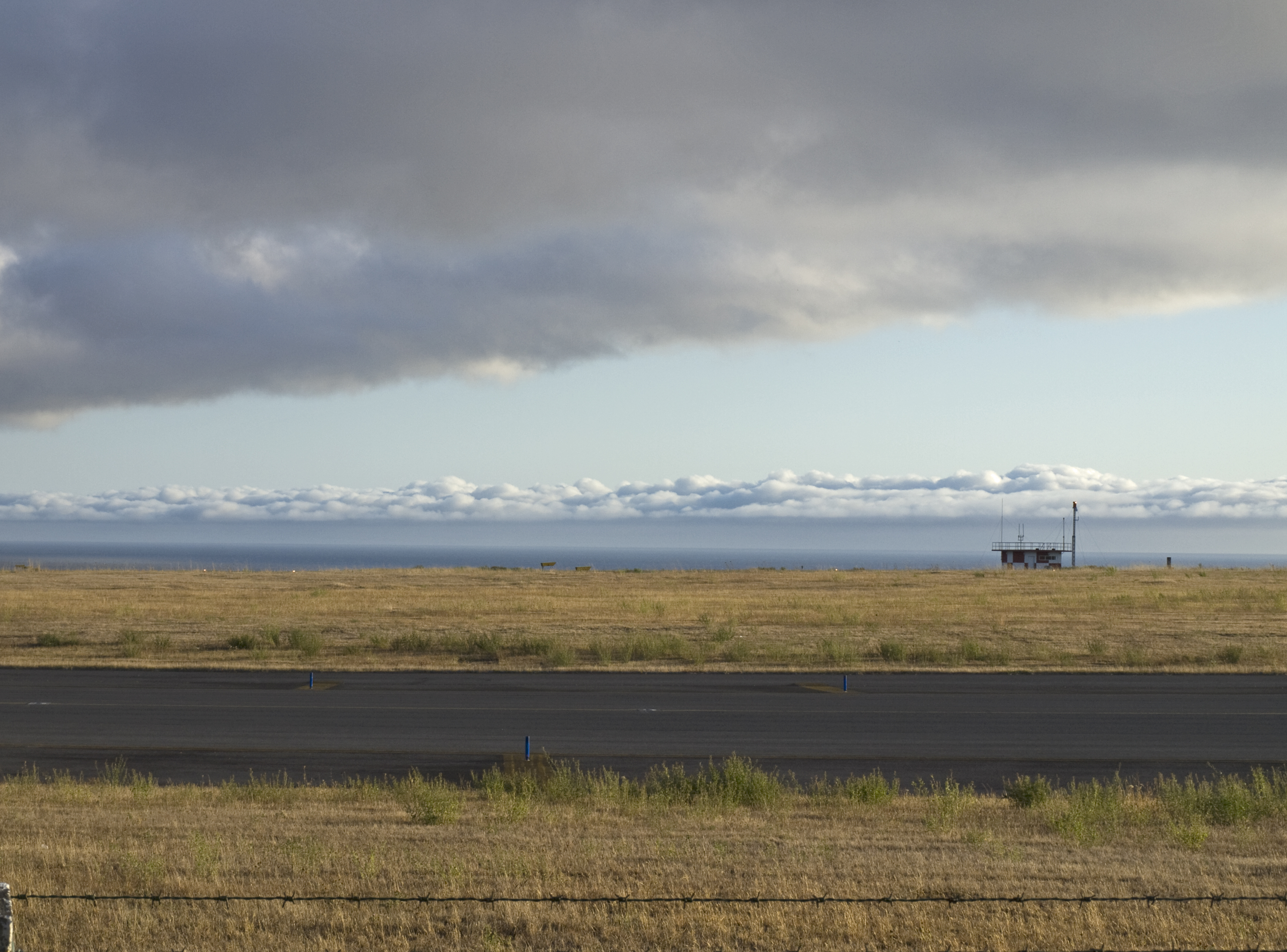
Landing strip of the airport with the Atlantic at the background

John Paul II Ponta Delgada Airport (Portuguese: Aeroporto de Ponta Delgada João Paulo II; (IATA: PDL, ICAO: LPPD)) is an international airport located on the island of São Miguel, in the Portuguese archipelago of the Azores. Situated two kilometres (one nautical mile) west of the city centre of Ponta Delgada, it is the primary (and busiest) airport in the Azores, as well as the fifth largest infrastructure managed by ANA Aeroportos de Portugal. The terminal was finished in 1995; by 2024 the airport served a total of nearly 3.3 million passengers. It has scheduled domestic flights to all islands of the Azores, plus Madeira and the mainland, namely (Lisbon, Porto and Faro). João Paulo II Airport also accommodates international flights to and from Europe and North America. The airport is the major hub for the SATA Group of airlines, which includes both inter-island SATA Air Açores and international Azores Airlines, and since April 2015 as a base for Ryanair.

== History ==
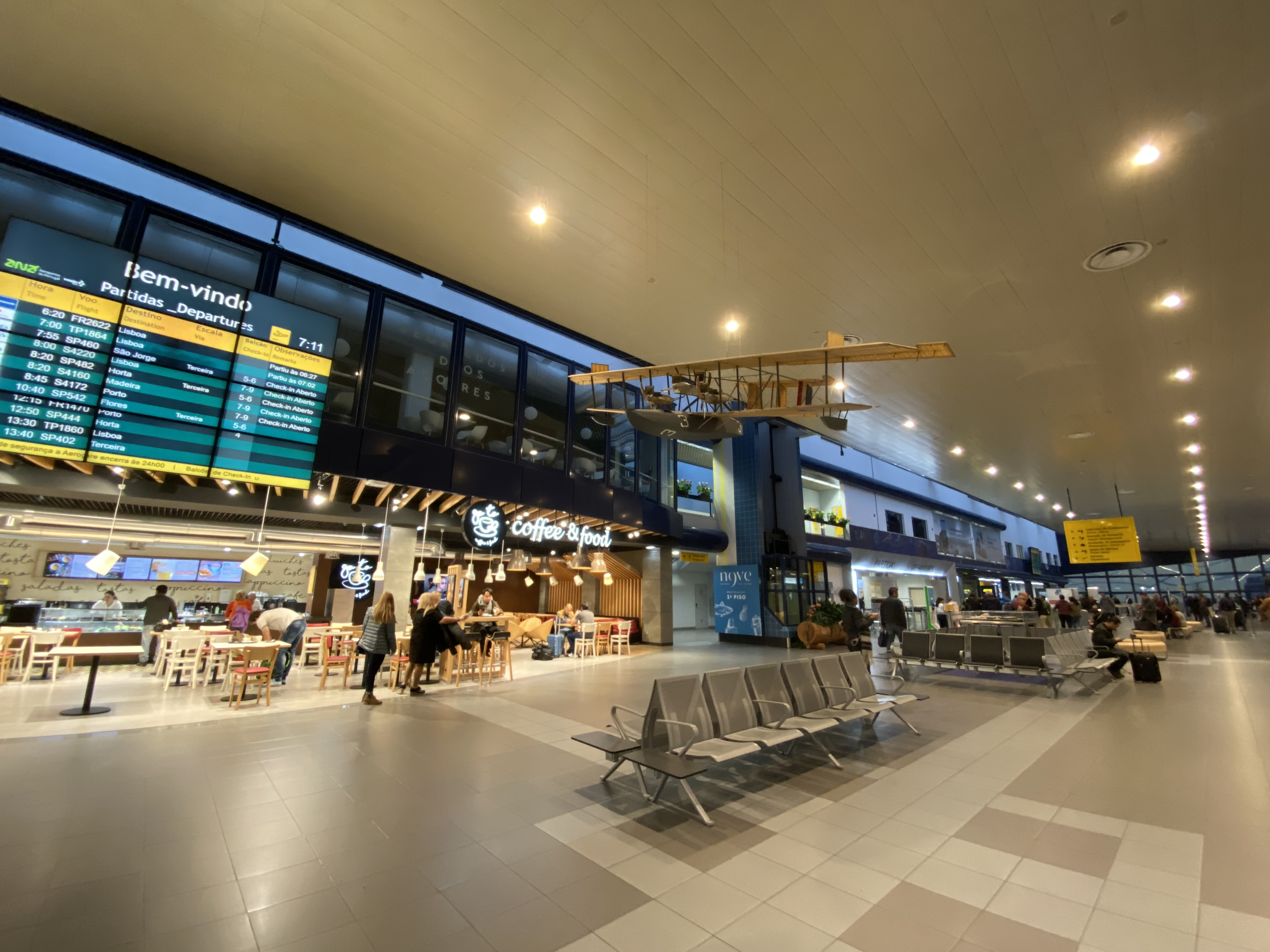
Interior of main terminal

The airport was inaugurated on 24 August 1969 by President Admiral Américo Tomás, after its construction was planned six years earlier, in 1963. Transferred from Santana, at the time of its opening, the runway was 1,800 metres (5,900 ft) long and was then referred to as the Aeroporto da Nordela, owing to its location at the extreme northwest of Ponta Delgada. It was built in order to serve inter-island connections and the continent, using a single Boeing 737 from the national flag carrier (TAP33). Regular flights to Lisbon began two years later.

In May 1995, at the inauguration of the airport terminal, the facility received the designation João Paulo II, in honour of the visit of the Pope to the Azores in 1991.

"This airport, is part of the integrated history and economic and social development of the Azores, in particular of the Micaelenses, and constitutes an relevant equipment at the service of air transport, not just of the passengers, but also the transport and mail. It is the infrastructure with the largest expression of air traffic in the autonomous region of the Azores, reaching in 2011 935,000 passengers."

Along with the airports in Lisbon, Porto, Faro, Flores, Santa Maria, Horta and Beja, the airport's concessions to provide support to civil aviation was conceded to ANA Aeroportos de Portugal on 18 December 1998, under provisions of decree 404/98. With this concession, ANA was also in charge of future planning, development and construction of future infrastructures.

== Airlines and destinations ==
The following airlines operate regular scheduled and charter flights at Ponta Delgada Airport:

Airlines	Destinations
Air Canada	Seasonal: Toronto–Pearson
Austrian Airlines	Seasonal: Vienna
Azores Airlines	Barcelona, Boston, Faro, Funchal, Lisbon, Montréal–Trudeau, New York–JFK, Paris–Charles de Gaulle, Porto, Praia, Toronto–Pearson; Seasonal: Frankfurt
Binter Canarias	Seasonal: Gran Canaria
British Airways	Seasonal: London–Heathrow
Edelweiss Air	Seasonal: Zurich
Eurowings	Seasonal: Düsseldorf
Iberia	Seasonal: Madrid
Lufthansa	Seasonal: Frankfurt
SATA Air Açores	Flores, Horta, Pico, Santa Maria, São Jorge, Terceira
Smartwings	Seasonal: Prague
TAP Air Portugal	Lisbon
Transavia	Seasonal: Amsterdam
United Airlines	Seasonal: Newark
WestJet	Seasonal: Toronto–Pearson

== Statistics ==
Busiest routes from João Paulo II Airport (2023)
Rank	City, airport	Passengers	% change from 2019	Top carriers
1	Lisbon	934,256	▲11.2%	Azores Airlines, Ryanair, TAP Air Portugal
2	Porto	331,882	▲4.5%	Azores Airlines, Ryanair
3	Terceira	249,385	▲34.6%	SATA Air Açores
4	Santa Maria	102,973	▲24.9%	SATA Air Açores
5	Pico	99,080	▲36.7%	SATA Air Açores
6	Horta	93,532	▲17.7%	SATA Air Açores
7	Toronto–Pearson	94,254	▲24.4%	Azores Airlines, TAP Air Portugal
8	Boston	87,258	▼22.1%	Azores Airlines, TAP Air Portugal
9	Funchal	71,725	▲55.2%	Azores Airlines
10	Flores	57,197	▲41.1%	SATA Air Açores

== Incidents ==
- A Delta Air Lines Boeing 757, operating Delta Flight 414 from JFK International Airport in New York City, suffered a hard landing on 18 August 2019. No injuries were reported but the airplane was damaged substantially.

== See also ==
- Aviation in the Azores
- Bari Karol Wojtyła Airport
- John Paul II International Airport Kraków–Balice
