= Santo António (São Roque do Pico) =

- Civil parish
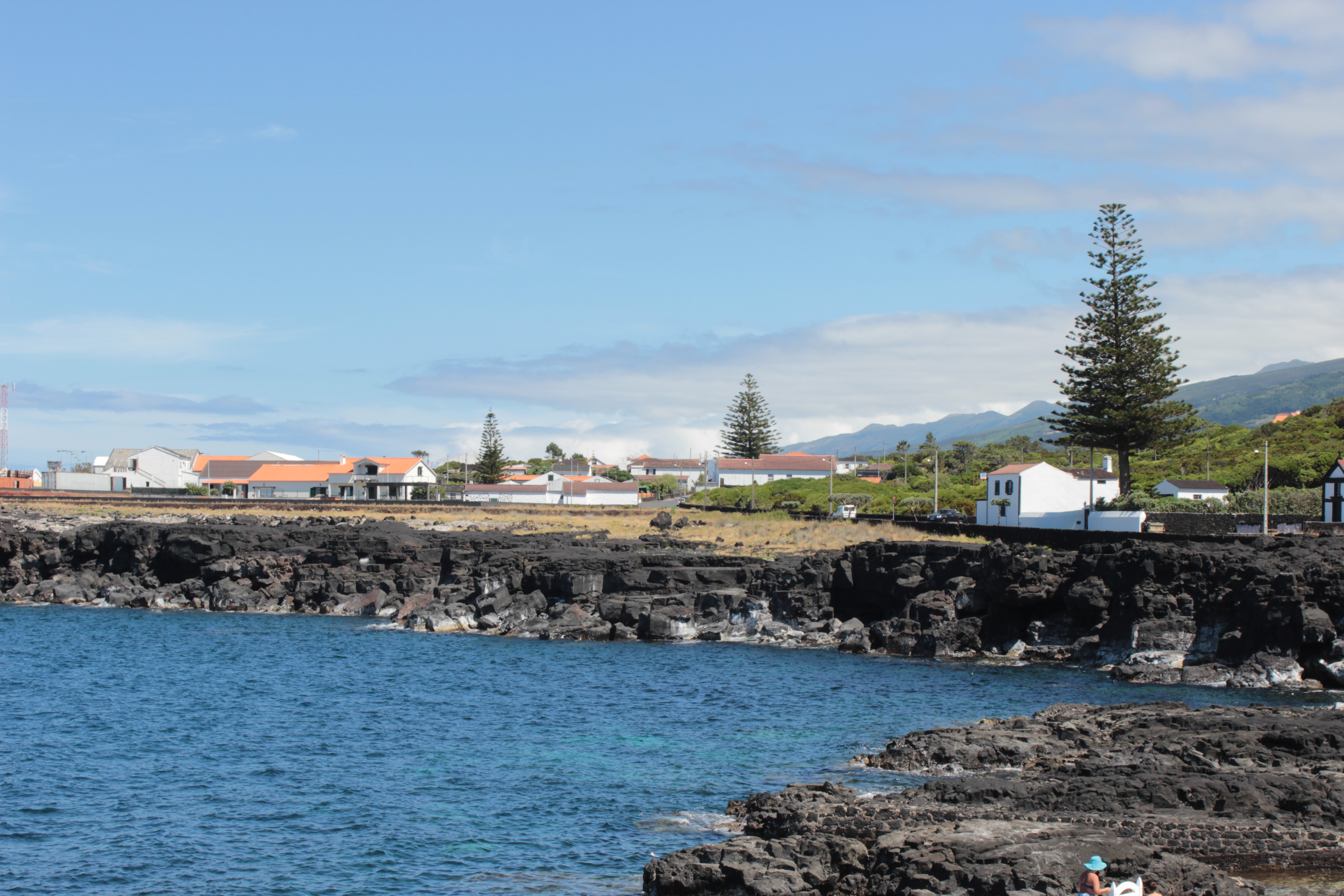

- Location of Santo Antonio within the municipality of São Roque do Pico, Pico Island
- Coordinates: 38°32′7″N 28°20′27″W
- Country: Portugal
- Auton. region: Azores
- Island: Pico
- Municipality: São Roque do Pico

Area
  - Total: 32.03 km^{2} (12.37 sq mi)
- Elevation: 51 m (167 ft)

Population (2011)
  - Total: 815
  - Density: 25.4/km^{2} (65.9/sq mi)
- Time zone: UTC−01:00 (AZOT)
  - Summer (DST): UTC+00:00 (AZOST)
- Postal code: 9940-235
- Area code: 292
- Patron: Santo António

Santo António is a civil parish in the municipality of São Roque do Pico on the northern coast of the island of Pico in the Portuguese archipelago of the Azores. The population in 2011 was 815 in an area of approximately 32.03 square kilometres (12.37 mi^{2}).

== History ==
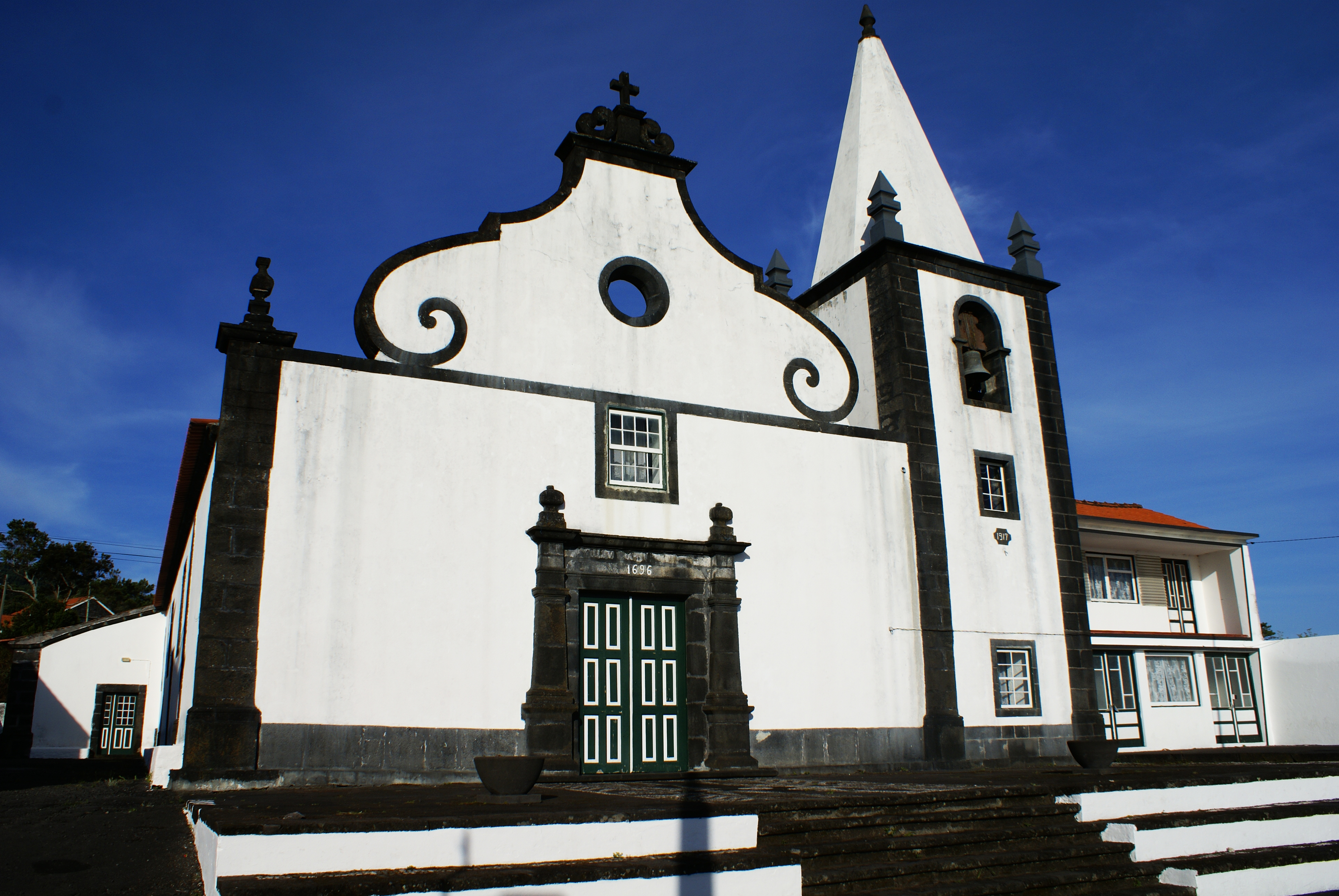
The front facade of the 17th century Church of Santo António

The parish remotes to the end of the 17th century, when it was ecclesiastical parish of Santo António, in honour of Anthony of Padua. Its principal centre of worship was dedicated to the invocation of the saint, the single-belfry Church of Santo António (which was unique at the time for having only one belltower, as compared to the other churches on the island). The church was dotted with a valuable retable located in the presbytery, elaborated in thin guildwork and its stoic large images dedicated to St. Anthony and the Sacred Heart of Jesus.

In addition, the parish included several hermitages dedicated to their respective saints, including the Hermitage of São Vicente, the Hermitage of Santa Ana, the chapel of Santo António da Furna, the Church of Santo António and the Império of the Divine Holy Spirit of Santo António, which all characterize the history of their localities.

== Geography ==
Santo António is one of the northern parishes of the municipality of São Roque do Pico; the administrative division, in the form of a trapezoid extends from the northern coast into the interior, partially dividing the mountain of Pico with its neighbours. It contains the localities Almas, Areal, Ginjal, Santana and São Vicente.

Population of Santo António (1864 - 2004)
Year	Pop.	±%
1864	1,559	—
1878	1,531	−1.8%
1890	1,410	−7.9%
1900	1,390	−1.4%
1911	1,220	−12.2%
1920	1,067	−12.5%
1930	1,032	−3.3%
1940	1,126	+9.1%
1950	1,206	+7.1%
1960	1,157	−4.1%
1970	989	−14.5%
1981	781	−21.0%
1991	751	−3.8%
2001	858	+14.2%
2004	815	−5.0%

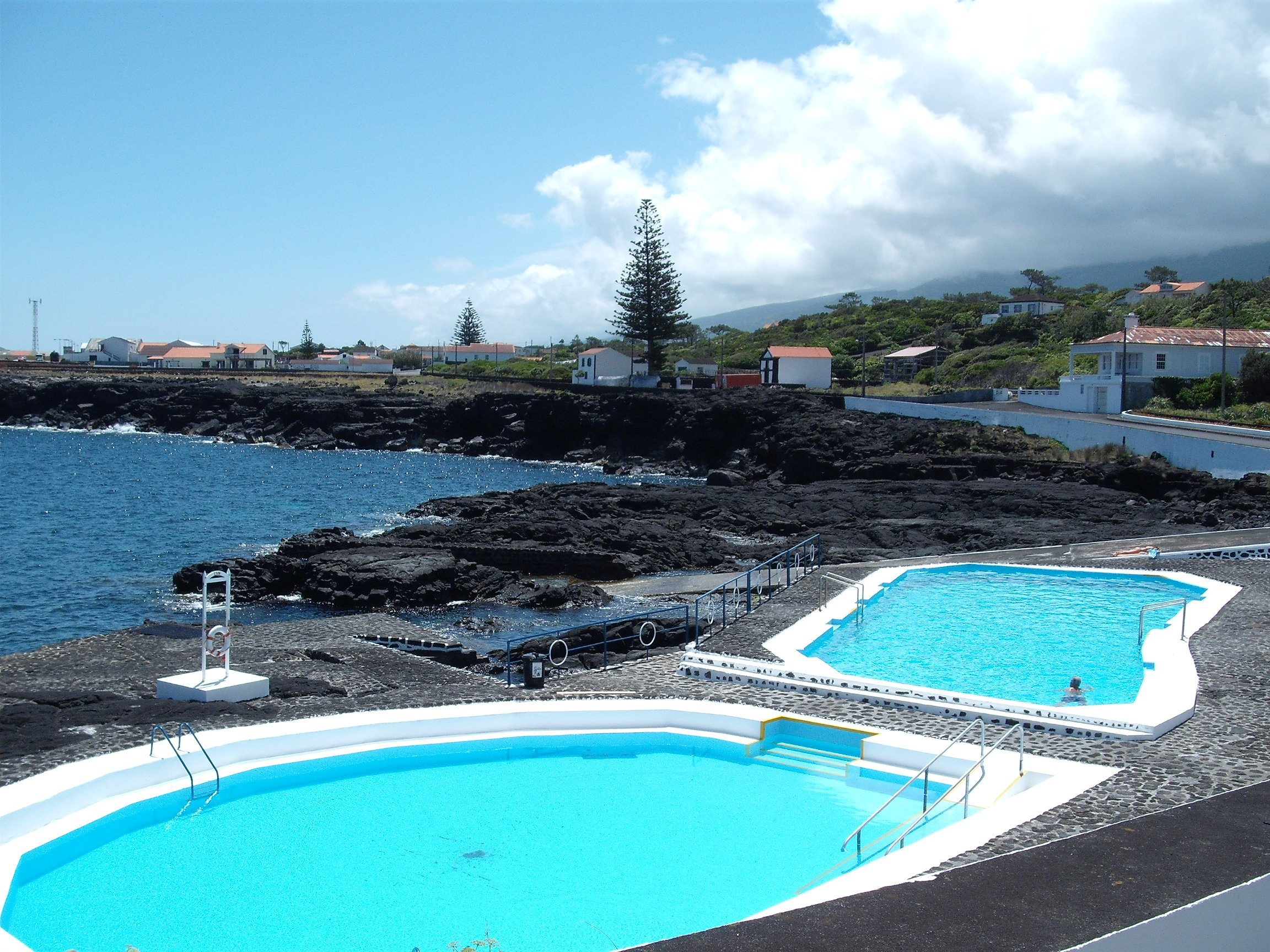
The swimming area of Furna de Santo António a complex of natural pools and rocky shoreline

Also in the civil parish is the Vigia da Baleia (a whalewatching outpost) situated at the top of the Cabeço da Vigia in Santana, which was constructed in the 20th century. Used originally for spotting whales transiting the region's waters, the outpost was part of the signaling system for hunting whales. Today it is an important local viewpoint, providing views of the coastal landscape and horizon. A simple rectangular structure, the structure is formed from reinforced concrete and the site accessible by pedestrian trail.

The developed human spaces includes the Jardim das Furnas (Furnas Garden), that includes children's playground and campsite. In addition, the coastal geomorphology has been responsible for the formation of inlets and coves that support maritime activities, that include the Piscinas Naturais da Furna de Santo António (Natural Pools of Furna de Santo António), a swimming area hewed from the crags and volcanic rocks of the northern coast.

== Architecture ==
=== Civic ===
- Gate on Ladeira de Santo António (Portuguese: Portal na Ladeira de Santo António)
- Lookout of the Chorões (Portuguese: Balcão dos Chorões)
- Old Roadway Santana ao Lajido (Portuguese: Caminho Velho - Santana ao Lajido)
- Port of Guindaste (Portuguese: Porto de Guindaste)
- Residences on Rua da Igreja (Portuguese: Casas de Habitação na À Rua da Igreja)
- Residences on Rua de Baixo de Santo António (Portuguese: Casas de Habitação na Rua de Baixo de Santo António)
- Residence on Largo da Ermida (Portuguese: Casa de Habitação no Largo da Ermida)
- Residence on Rua de Santo António (Portuguese: Casa de Habitação na Rua de Santo António)
- Residence in Furna (Portuguese: Casa de Habitação em Furna)
- Residence with Tower on Rua das Almas (Portuguese: Casa de Habitação com Torre na Rua das Almas
- Rural Residence on Caminho de São Vicente (Portuguese: Casa Rural no Caminho de São Vicente)
- Threshing Circle of Canada do Mar (Portuguese: Eira da Canada do Mar)
- Tidal Pool of Canada do Mar (Portuguese: Poço do Maré ao fundo da Canada do Mar)
- Tidal Pool of Retiro (Portuguese: Poço de Maré no Retiro)
- Windmill of Caminho de Baixo da Eira (Portuguese: Moinho de vento do Caminho de Baixo da Eira)
- Windmill of the Santana Primary School (Portuguese: Moinho de vento da Escola Primária de Santana)
- Whalewatching Outpost of Santana (Portuguese: Vigia da Baleia da Santana)

=== Religious ===
- Church of Santo António (Portuguese: Igreja de Santo António)
- Hermitage of Mãe de Deus (Portuguese: Ermida de Mãe de Deus)
- Império of Santana (Portuguese: Império de Santana)
