= São Roque do Pico =

- Municipality
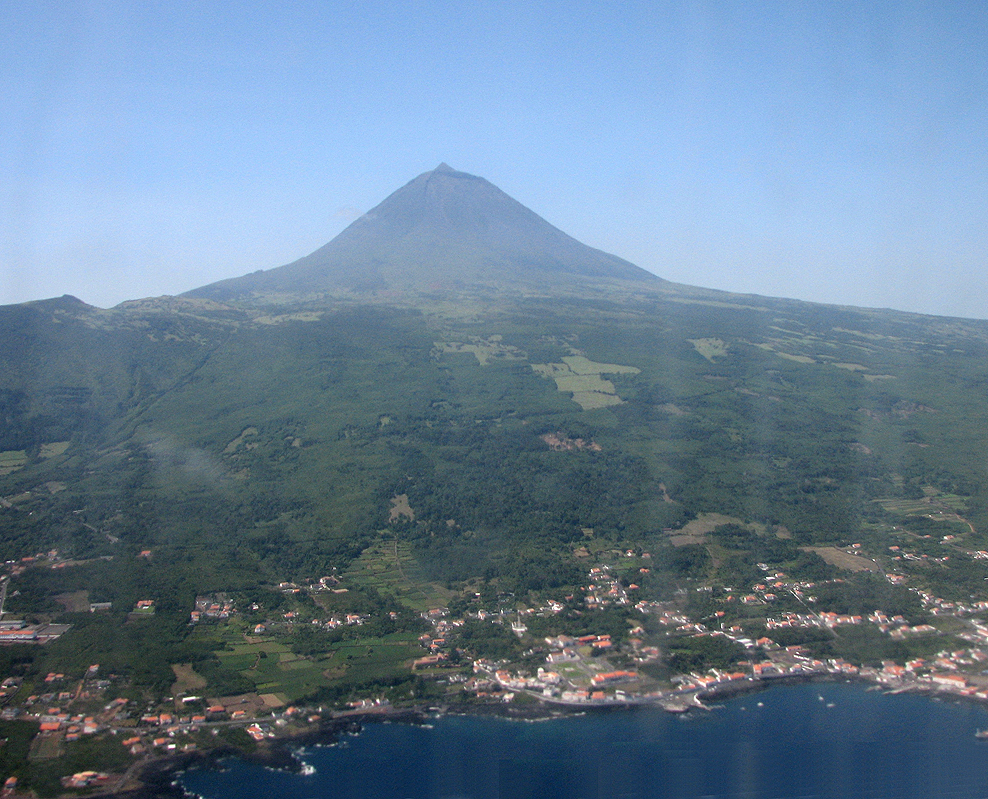
- São Roque do Pico includes most of the northern coast of the island, and extends to the summit of the stratovolcano

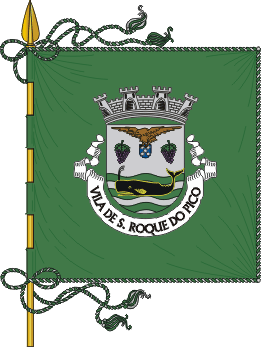
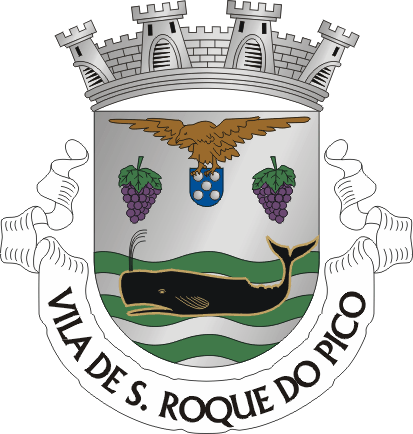
- Flag Coat of arms
- Interactive map of São Roque do Pico
- Coordinates: 38°31′46″N 28°19′19″W
- Country: Portugal
- Auton. region: Azores
- Island: Pico
- Established: Settlement: fl. 1500; Municipality: c. 1542
- Parishes: 5

Government
  - President: Luís Filipe Silva (PSD)

Area
  - Total: 142.36 km^{2} (54.97 sq mi)
- Highest elevation: 2,351 m (7,713 ft)
- Lowest elevation: 0 m (0 ft)

Population (2021)
  - Total: 3,221 ▼
  - Density: 22.63/km^{2} (58.60/sq mi)
- Time zone: UTC−01:00 (AZOT)
  - Summer (DST): UTC+00:00 (AZOST)
- Postal code: 9940-353
- Area code: (+351) 292 XX XX XX
- Patron: São Roque
- Local holiday: 16 August
- Website: http://www.municipiosrp.pt/

São Roque do Pico (Portuguese pronunciation: [sɐ̃w ˈʁɔkɨ ðu ˈpiku]) is a municipality in the Portuguese archipelago of the Azores, occupying most of the northern side of the island of Pico. As of 2021, it has 3,221 inhabitants spread through five freguesias (civil parishes) in an area of 142.36 km².

The municipality is bordered by the Atlantic to the north, Lajes do Pico to the south and east, and Madalena to the west.

== History ==
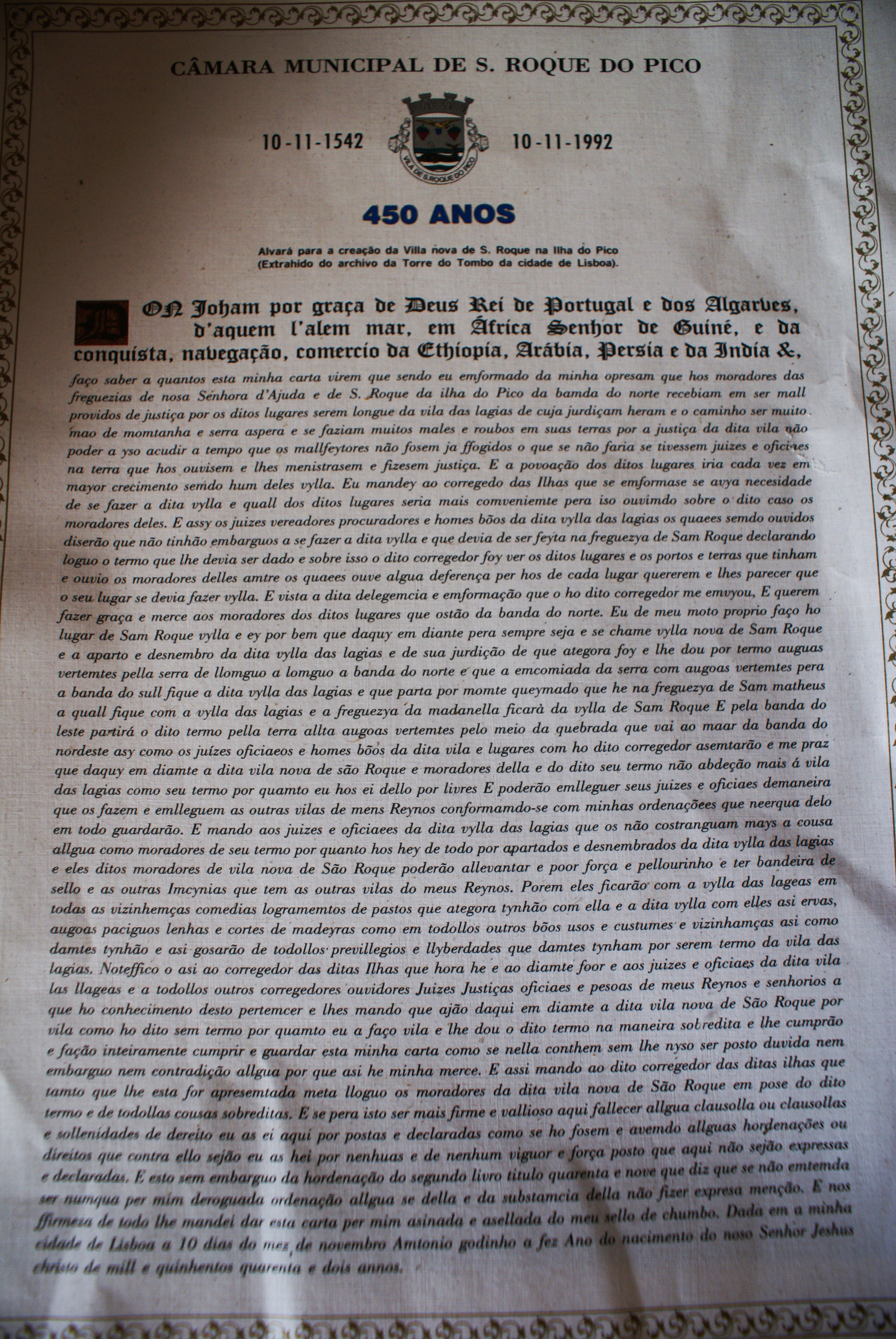
A copy of the royal proclamation elevating the village of São Roque do Pico

While the first incursions into the island occurred in the 15th century, the region that would become known as São Roque occurred later. The first colonizers of Pico came to occupy the area of Lajes, coming from the lands of the north of Portugal, because there were few anchorages in other parts of the island. What occurred in the north was starkly different: these colonizers were families from Graciosa, who would much later be supplemented by Flemings from Faial, under the orders of Josse van Huerter. At this time São Roque was a peripheral jurisdiction of Lajes do Pico, and many of its religious and cultural ceremonies were centred in this municipal centre from the Convent of São Francisco.

This influence of Faial would continue for much of the island's history, becoming integrated into the Captaincy (colonial administration) of its neighbour.

The municipality was created in 1542, when its citizenry petitioned King John of Portugal to provide them administrative autonomy from Lajes. King John, therefore, carved from Lajes do Pico the territory of São Roque do Pico, while at the same time instituting the civil parishes of São Roque and Nossa Senhora da Ajuda. By granting this concession, the Álvares family promised to celebrate a mass once per week "...until the World lasted", which has been transmitted across their descendants.

The little hermitage of São Roque, and chapel of Bom Jesus, was insufficient to handle its growing populous, and it was decided in 1714 to construct the Church of São Roque, which was completed twelve years.

At the time the population was dedicated primarily to a subsistence lifestyle, with some small cultivation of grapes for the production of wine, and an active fishery. The volcanic eruptions that occurred during the 18th century turned much of the soil fertile, that resulted in the mass production of Verdelho wine, which was a popular export to America and Europe.

By the 19th century, disease infected the vineyards of the north, devastating the wine-making culture, which slowly progressed throughout the island, until the introduction of new castes. But, meanwhile, the Sãoroquenses turned to other economic sources of growth, but specifically, concentrating on the whaling in order to supplement the fishery. This culture was an important part of the municipality, resulting in the establishment of five separate factories along the coast in order support the transformation of whales into oils, perfumes and fertilizers. Even by the 20th century, the municipal seat became the home for the Fabrica das Armações Baleeiras Reunidas create in 1942, which was a union between the older companies Companhia Velha Baleeira, Lda., Armação Baleeira do Livramento, Lda. and the Armação Baleeira Atlântica, Lda. and continued to function until the 1980s. After this, the building was transformed in the post-whaling period into a museum to exhibit the artifacts for this era, including machines, implements and maquetes demonstrating the whale hunt, the peoples involved in the activity and the hardships of the local economy associated with whaling.

== Geography ==
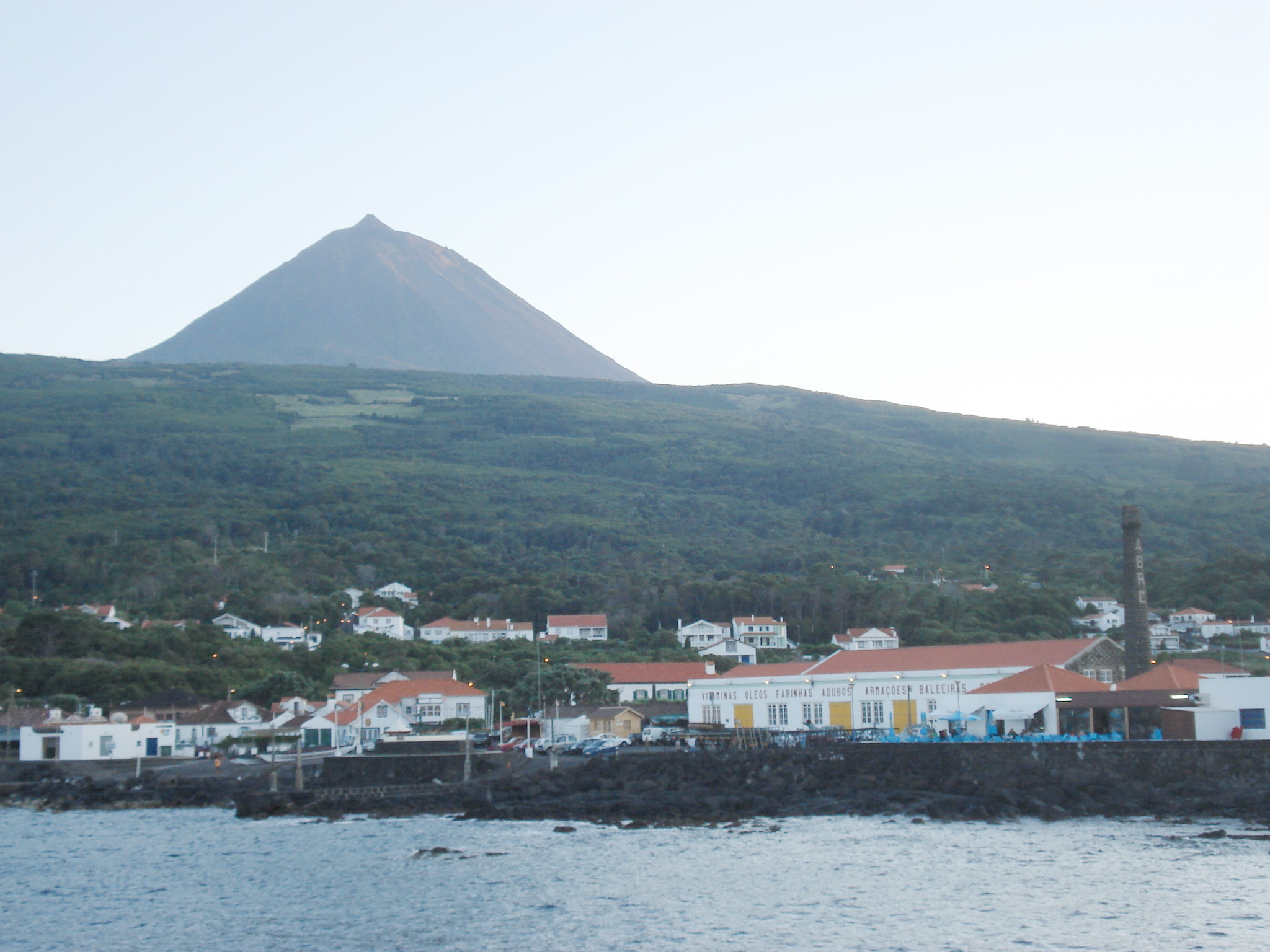
The port and historic centre of the civil parish of São Roque, showing the whaling museum, and former rendering factory along the coast

The climate of the municipality is mild and humid, with median temperatures oscillating between 14 °C (57 °F) and 22 °C (72 °F), with a regular level of precipitation throughout the year. The municipal seat of São Roque is the primary urban agglomeration along the northern coast, organized around two principal poles: in the west, the historic village of São Roque and Cais do Pico in the east, which grew from the activities associated with the sea, whaling and fishing after the middle of the 19th century. These two areas form the nucleus of the civil parish of São Roque, but the municipality of São Roque do Pico extends over one third of the island of Pico, along the northern coast, encompassing five civil parishes, that consist of:

- Prainha - The second settlement founded on the northern coast of the island; the settlement was for centuries the center of production of the verdelho wine. It is located relatively close to a lava field resulting from a volcanic eruption in 1572, and overlooked by a small bucolic lagoon, Lagoa do Caiado.
- Santa Luzia - Includes the seaside villages of Lajido and Cabrito, but extends to many typical buildings constructed from basaltic volcanic rock, including the Lajido do Meio and the area around Ribeira Nova.
- Santo Amaro - A parish recognized for its contribution to manual shipbuilding on the island, it settlements extend along the coast from the main village to heights of Terra Alta.
- Santo António - Named after the Portuguese-born saint, the parish includes the small villages of Santana and Sao Vicente.
- São Roque - A relatively old town and commercial port (Cais do Pico) connected with the whaling industry and the site of the only whaling-processing factory in the municipality.

=== Climate ===
Due to its location at the northern foothills of Mount Pico and the Achada Plateau, São Roque has a unique micro-climate, receiving more precipitation than any other municipality in Portugal. Averaging between 1,100 and 2,000 mm (43 and 79 in) at the coast and surpassing 4,000 mm (160 in) in the mountains. Twice as much as in the neighboring municipality of Madalena or in the remaining islands of the archipelago.

According to the Köppen climate classification, the coastal areas of São Roque have a humid subtropical climate, but with significant Mediterranean influences. Winters are very mild and wet and summers are warm and drier. Humidity is around 80% year-round.

Climate data for Cais do Pico, 1977-1995, altitude 40 m (130 ft)
Month	Jan	Feb	Mar	Apr	May	Jun	Jul	Aug	Sep	Oct	Nov	Dec	Year
Average precipitation mm (inches)	203.8 (8.02)	271.3 (10.68)	180.1 (7.09)	130.2 (5.13)	98.5 (3.88)	59.9 (2.36)	33.3 (1.31)	63.6 (2.50)	93.3 (3.67)	188.6 (7.43)	256.4 (10.09)	272.2 (10.72)	1,851.2 (72.88)
Source: Portuguese Environmental Agency

== Architecture ==
=== Civic ===
- Consolatory/Assistance Station/Outpost (Portuguese: Posto de Consulta e Socorros de São Roque do Pico)
- Customs Station/Outpost (Portuguese: Posto de Despacho da Alfândega de São Roque do Pico)
- District Court of São Roque do Pico (Portuguese: Tribunal da Comarca de São Roque do Pico)
- Historical Centre of São Roque do Pico (Portuguese: Núcleo Urbano da Vila de São Roque do Pico)
- Guarda Fiscal Station/Outpost (Portuguese: Posto da Guarda Fiscal de São Roque do Pico)
- Subregional Hospital of São Roque do Pico (Portuguese: Hospital Subregional de São Roque do Pico)

=== Religious ===
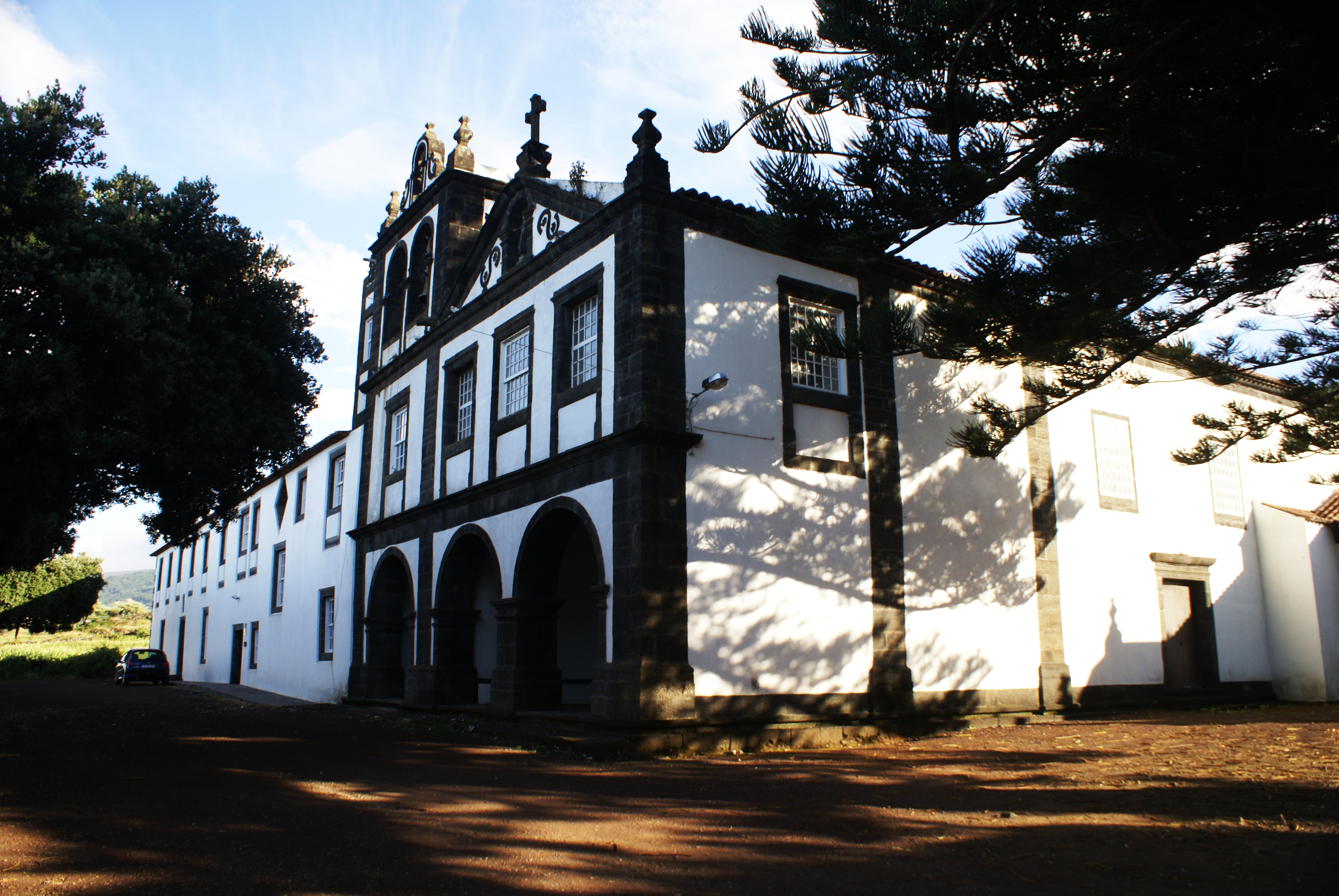
The front facade of the Convent and Church of São Pedro de Alcântara, overlooking the central part of the parish of São Roque

- Church of Nossa Senhora da Ajuda (Portuguese: Igreja Paroquial de Prainha/Igreja de Nossa Senhora da Ajuda)
- Church of Santa Luzia (Portuguese: Igreja de Santa Luzia)
- Church of Santo Amaro (Portuguese: Igreja Paroquial de Santo Amaro/Igreja de Santo Amaro)
- Church of Santo Antóno (Portuguese: Igreja Paroquial de Santo António/Igreja de Santo António)
- Church of São Roque (Portuguese: Igreja de São Roque)
- Convent of São Pedro de Alcântara (Portuguese: Convento de São Pedro de Alcântara), a 16th-century Franciscan convent established in the old Cais do Pico area of the municipal capital, centre of monastic life on the northern part of the island, until it was abandoned by the order following the Liberal Revolution of 1820. It changed hands in successive years to serve as courts, prison and finance services before falling into ruin, before converted to youth hostel.
- Hermitage of São Vicente (Portuguese: Ermida de São Vicente), erected in the mid-18th century and dedicated to Vincent of Saragossa, the small hermitage is identifiable by its pyramidal belltower and belfrey shaped in the form of cross of the Order of Christ.
