= Corvo =

Corvo is the Italian, Portuguese, and Galician word for crow, and may refer to:

== Places ==
- Rio Corvo, a tributary of the Ceira River in the Serra do Acor, Portugal
- Corvo Island
- Corvo (Azores), the only municipality on the island of Corvo
- Corvo Airport, airport for Vila do Corvo
- Corvo, Cape Verde
- Corvo, Italy

== Other ==
- Corvo (surname)
- Corvo (knife), a type of curved blade from Chile
- Corvo Attano, fictional character in Dishonored
- Il corvo (1761), a play by Carlo Gozzi
- Willys FAMAE Corvo, or simply Corvo, a Chilean military vehicle
- Corvos, a Portuguese band
- Sypaq Corvo, a brand of drone

== See also ==
- Pontecorvo (disambiguation), including Ponte Corvo
- Corvus (disambiguation)
- Cuervo (disambiguation)
