= Windmills of Corvo =

Group of windmills in the Azores

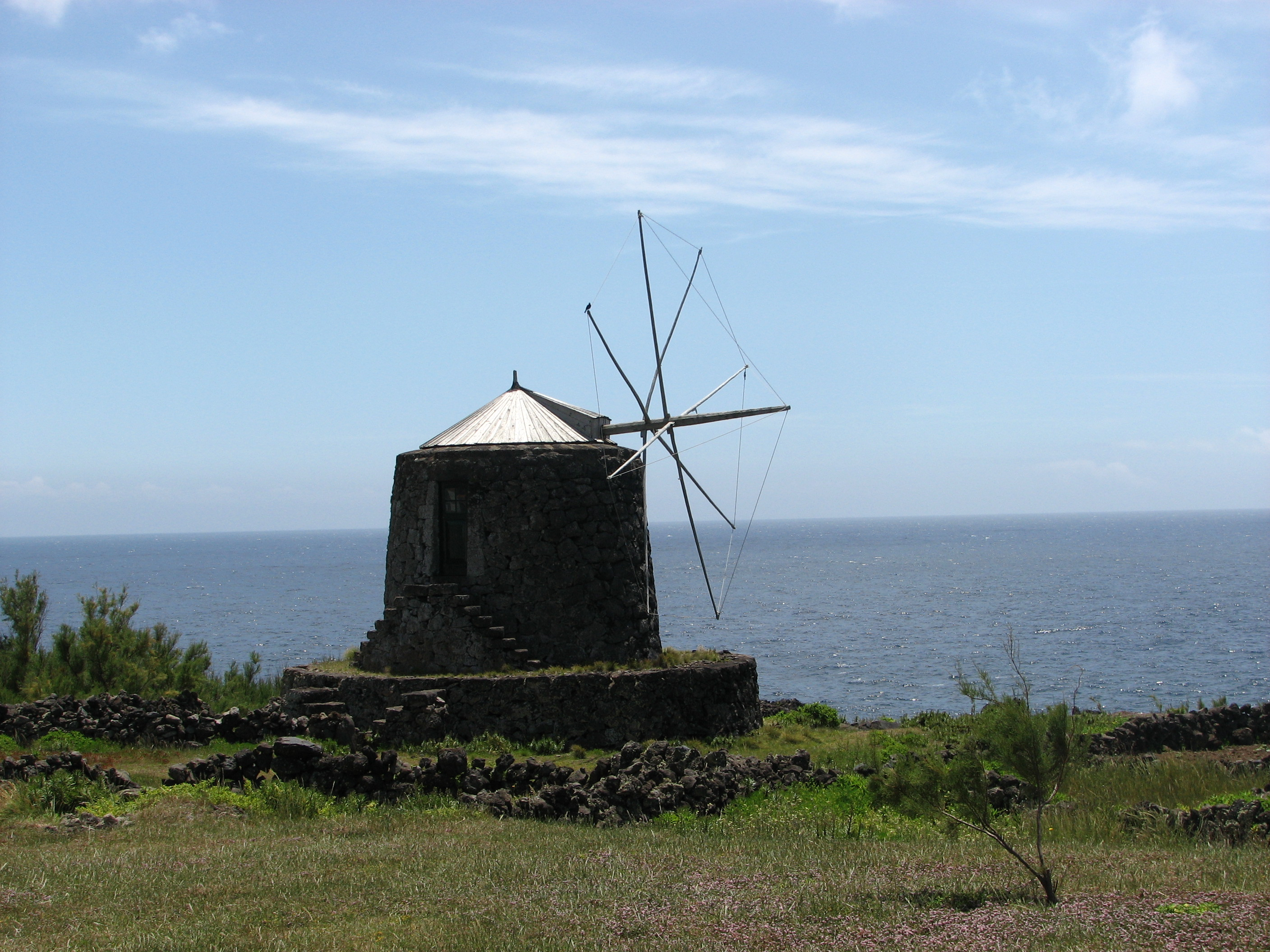
- The rustic/original appearance of one of the windmills, on the eastern edge of Ponta Negra
- Interactive map of Windmills of Corvo

Origin
- Mill location: Vila do Corvo, Azores, Portugal
- Coordinates: 39°40′12.33″N 31°06′50″W
- Year built: 18th century

Information
- Type: Windmill

The Windmills of Corvo (Portuguese: Moinhos de vento do Corvo/Moinhos de vento da Ponta Negra) is a group of windmills located in the municipality of Vila do Corvo, island of Corvo, in the Portuguese archipelago of the Azores.

== History ==
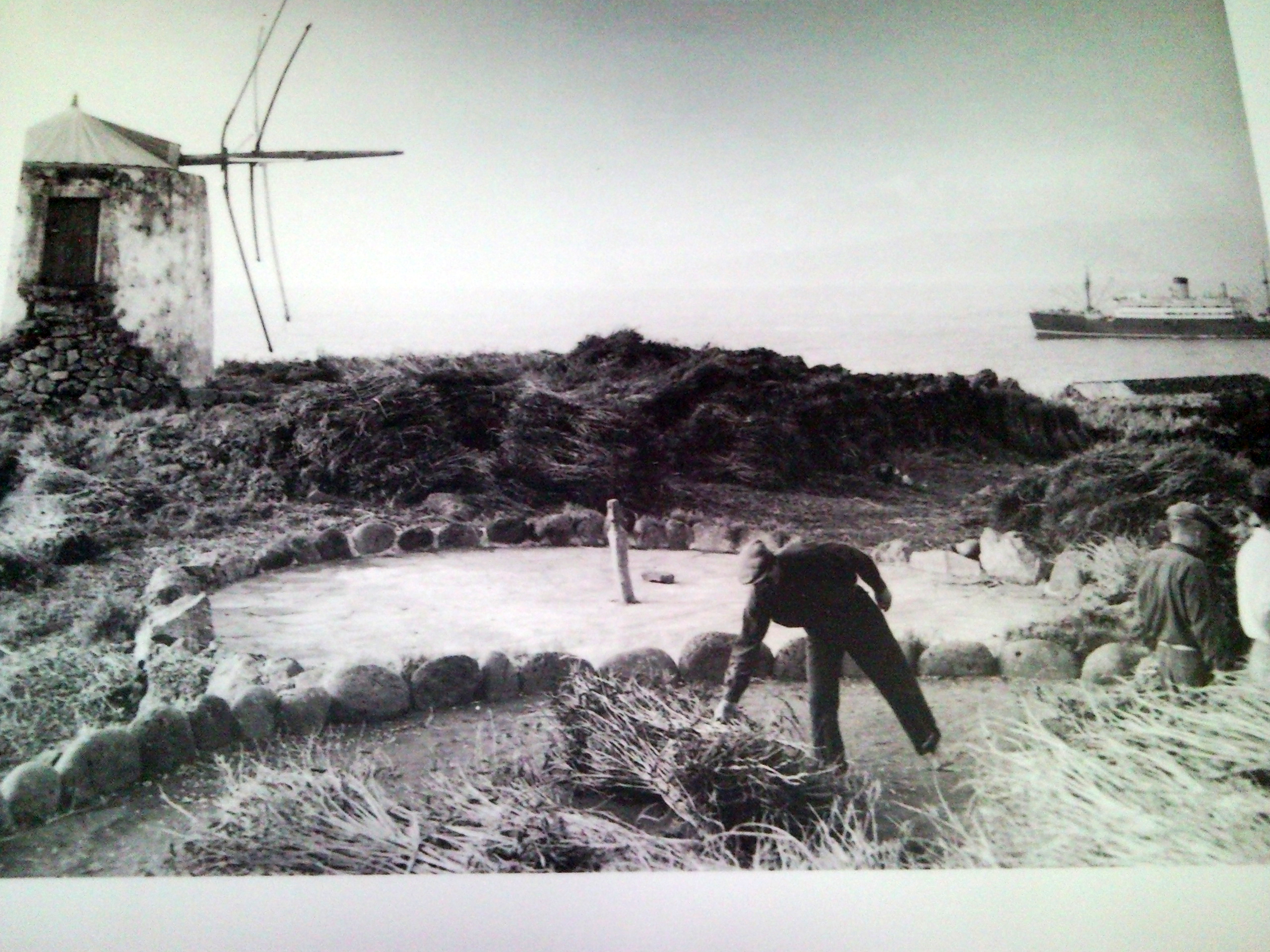
An image of one of the windmills and threshing circle in operation at the beginning of the 20th century

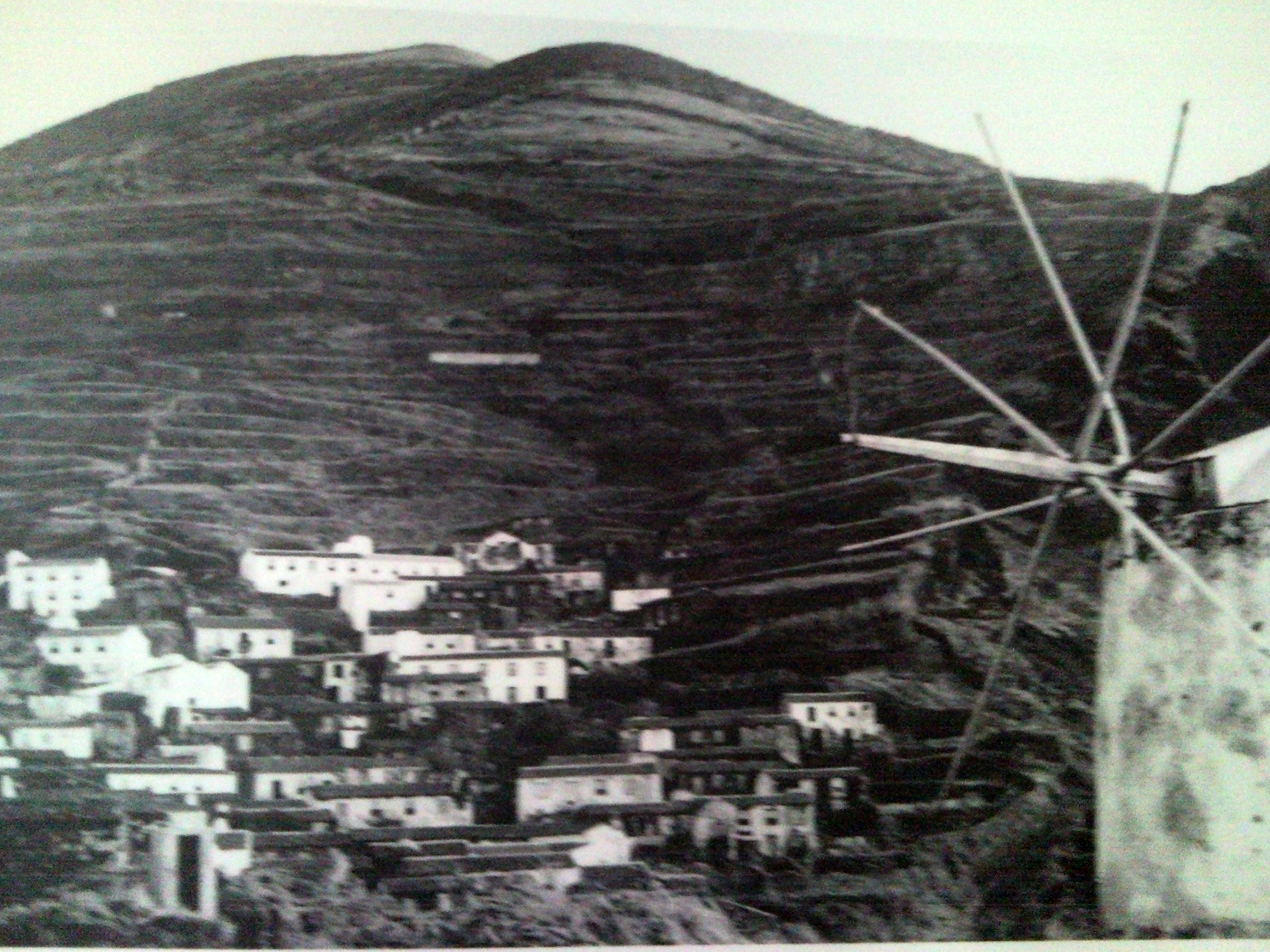
A view from Ponta Negra towards the old Vila do Corvo, before the airfield, with windmill

The group of windmills were constructed during the late 19th or early 20th century.

Local memory of other windmills on the island is limited; of the seven that existed, three remained by the late 20th century, conserved in a good state, and adopting the characteristics of those typical in southern Portugal or from island of Porto Santo in the archipelago of Madeira.

With an investment of 100,000 Euros, the town council recuperated the three windmills in order to make the site more attractive to tourists. "They are in a location of great honour to Corvo. They are near the airport, with view of the lighthouse, view of the sand of the new port. It is a location of excellence in Corvo", confirmed alderman Manuel Rita. In 2012, the council invested 38,000 Euros in the recuperation of the first of the three windmills, by a tradesman from the island of São Miguel through the ProRural financing program within the European Union.

The recuperation of the windmills was only possible after the original property-owners had ceded the structures to the municipality for five years.

== Architecture ==
The windmills are located at the isolated southern tip of Corvo, opposite the airfield on the small inclined parcel known as Ponta Negra, near the small light of Ponta Negra.

The group consists of three, conical windmills, built from masonry stone: two plastered and painted white, while the other remains in a natural state. It is covered in conical rooftop that rotates, made of wood, from which springs the main shaft and sail axis. The base of the windmills consists of circular basalt stone, broken by small symmetrical staircase. The only point of entry is the main door, at the top of the staircase, elevated from the small platform/landing.
