= List of windmills in Portugal =

This is a list of notable windmills in Portugal.

== Azores ==
Location	Type	Built	Citation	Photograph
Ponta Negra, Vila do Corvo (Windmills of Corvo)	Tower	18th-19th century		
Ajuda da Bretanha	Tower			
Calheta	Tower			
Fajã de Cima	Tower			
Feteira	Post			
Lajes do Pico	Post			
Madalena	Post			
Madalena	Post			
Pedro Miguel	Tower			
Praia do Almoxarife	Post			
Santa Cruz da Graciosa	Tower			
Santa Cruz da Graciosa	Tower			
São Roque do Pico	Post			
Vila do Corvo	Tower			
Velas	Tower			
Vila do Porto	Tower			

== Cape Verde ==
Location	Type	Built	Notes	Photograph
Ribeira de Calhau	Tower			
Santa Maria	Hollow post			

== Madeira ==
Location	Type	Built	Notes	Photograph
Porto Santo Island	Tower		Standing in 1825	

== Portugal ==
Location	Type	Built	Citation	Photograph
Aboim	Tower			
Albufeira	Tower			
Albufeira	Tower			
Albufeira	Tower			
Apúlia e Fão	Tower			
Apúlia e Fão	Tower			
Apúlia e Fão	Tower			
Barreiro	Tower			
Barreiro	Tower			
Boliqueime	Tower			
Burgau	Tower			
Cabanas de Torres	Tower			
Carrapateira	Tower			
Carreço	Tower			
Carreço	Tower			
Casalinho da Ajuda	Tower			
Casalinho da Ajuda	Tower			
Castro Marim	Tower			
Cibões e Brufe	Tower			
Ericeira	Tower			
Figueira da Foz	Post			
Leiria	Tower			
Lisbon	Tower			
Loulé	Tower			
Mafra	Tower			
Mafra	Tower			
Miróbriga	Tower			
Moita dos Ferreiros	Tower			
Mosqueira	Tower			
Mosqueira	Tower			
Mosqueira	Tower			
Óbidos	Tower			
Odeceixe	Tower			
Odiáxere	Tower			
Paderne	Tower			
Paderne	Tower			
Paderne	Tower			
Pêra	Tower			
Pêra	Tower			
Pêra	Tower			
Porto de Mós	Tower			
Rogil	Tower			
São Bartolomeu de Messines	Tower			
São Bartolomeu dos Galegos	Tower			
Setúbal	Tower			
Viana do Castelo	Tower			
Vila Real de Santo António	Tower			
