= Cuervo (disambiguation) =

Cuervo is a surname.

Cuervo may also refer to:

- Cuervo, New Mexico
- Jose Cuervo, a brand of tequila

== See also ==
- El Cuervo (disambiguation)
- Corvo (disambiguation)
- Corvus (disambiguation)
