= Vila do Corvo Municipal Chamber =

Legislative body of Vila do Corvo

Coordinates: 39.67296°N 31.11348°W

Vila do Corvo Municipal Chamber Câmara Municipal de Vila do Corvo
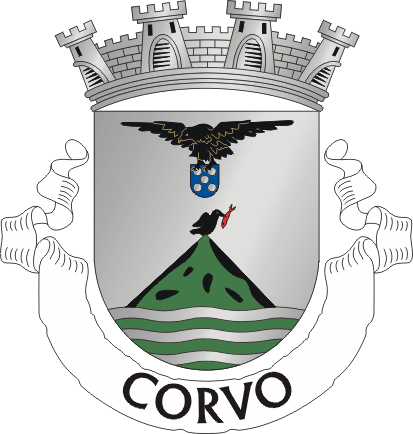
- Coat of arms of the town of Vila do Corvo

Type
- Type: Câmara municipal
- Term limits: 3

History
- Founded: 20 June 1832; 192 years ago

Leadership
- President: José Manuel Alves da Silva, PS since 20 October 2021
- Vice President: Óscar Manuel Valentim da Rocha, PS since 20 October 2021

Structure
- Seats: 5
- Political groups: Municipal Executive (3) PS (3) Opposition (2) PSD (2)
- Length of term: Four years

Elections
- Last election: 26 September 2021
- Next election: Sometime between 22 September and 14 October 2025

Meeting place
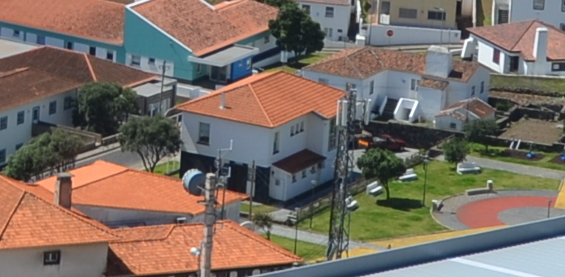
- Paços do Concelho de Vila do Corvo

Website
- www.cm-corvo.pt

The Vila do Corvo Municipal Chamber (Portuguese: Câmara Municipal de Vila do Corvo) is the administrative authority in the Azorean municipality of Vila do Corvo. It has exercised its authority over the whole of Corvo Island, the smallest island in the Azores archipelago, since 1832, when the settlement on Corvo Island called Nossa Senhora dos Milagres was elevated to the category of town and given an independent town council. On the same date, the town was renamed Vila do Corvo.

Throughout history, this municipality has suffered some changes, such as in 1895, when, by virtue of a Decree dated 18 November 1895, the Municipality of Corvo was abolished. In 1898, again by a Decree, this time dated 13 January 1898, it was re-established.

== Heraldry ==
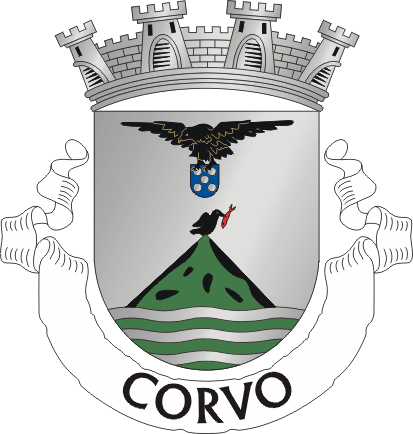
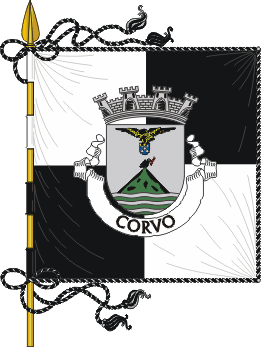
Coat of Arms and Flag of Corvo

The town hall's coat of arms is silver, with a black raven holding a red fish in its beak. The raven (corvo in Portuguese) is perched on a green hill above silver and green waves. It has three pieces: In chief is black goshawk highlighted in gold and holding a quina of Portugal in its claws.

The seal of this municipality has a round shape in which the pieces of the shield are loose and the enamels are not indicated. Around it, between concentric circles, is the legend “Câmara Municipal do Corvo”.

The flag is quartered in white and black, with the coat-of-arms in the center, topped by a silver crown with four towers and a silver list below with the words “Corvo” in black letters.

== List of the Presidents of the Municipal Chamber of Vila do Corvo ==
- Joaquim Pedro Coelho — (1833)
- Rafael Coelho — (1833)
- Filipe José de Avelar — (1834)
- Manuel Coelho de Fraga — (1835)
- Joaquim Pedro Coelho — (1836)
- Inácio Marcelino — (1865–1869)
- Manuel Lourenço Jorge — (1870–1875)
- António José de Fraga — (1876–1877)
- Manuel do Nascimento — (1878)
- Inácio Pedro Coelho — (1878–1879)
- Manuel do Nascimento — (1880–1881)
- João Jacinto de Fraga – (1882)
- Manuel Tomás Eugénio — (1883)
- Manuel José Furtado — (1884–1885)
- Manuel Coelho Mendes — (1886)
- Manuel Inácio de Mendonça — (1887)
- João Lourenço Alves — (1888)
- João Valadão do Rosário — (1889)
- Manuel lourenço Jorge — (1890)
- Manuel de Fraga Estácio Greves — (1891–1895)

By a decree of 18/11/1895 the Corvo Municipality was disestablished

By a decree of 13/01/1898 the Corvo Municipality was established once more

- Camilo Inácio de Avelar — (1898)
- Manuel Pereira Zerbone — (1899–1901)
- Raulino José Lourenço — (1902–1908)
- Camilo Inácio de Avelar — (1909–1910)
- Manuel Pedro Nunes — (1910–1911)
- Fernando da Costa — (1911–1913)
- Joaquim Pedro Nunes — (1914)
- Joaquim Lourenço de Freitas — (1915–1917)
- Manuel Joaquim Vicente — (1918–1922)
- João lourenço Alves — (1923–1926)
- Manuel Lourenço Alves — (1927)
- Pedro Penedo da Rocha — (1928–1934)
- José Mendonça de Inês — (1934–1938)
- Manuel José de Avelar — (1938–1953)
- David Santos — (1953–1965)
- Alfredo Lopes — (1965–1974)
- Óscar Patrício da Rocha — (1974–1976)
- Lino Luís de Freitas Fraga — (1976–1982)
- José Vinício de Fraga — (1982–1989)
- João David Cardigos dos Reis — (1989–1993)
- Manuel das Pedras Rita — (1993–2001)
- João Maria Fraga Greves — (2001–2005)
- Fernando António Pimentel – (2005–2009)
- Manuel das Pedras Rita – (2009–2013)
- José Manuel Alves da Silva – (2013–2025)
