= Church of Nossa Senhora dos Milagres (Corvo) =

- Church of Our Lady of Miracles
- Igreja de Nossa Senhora dos Milagres
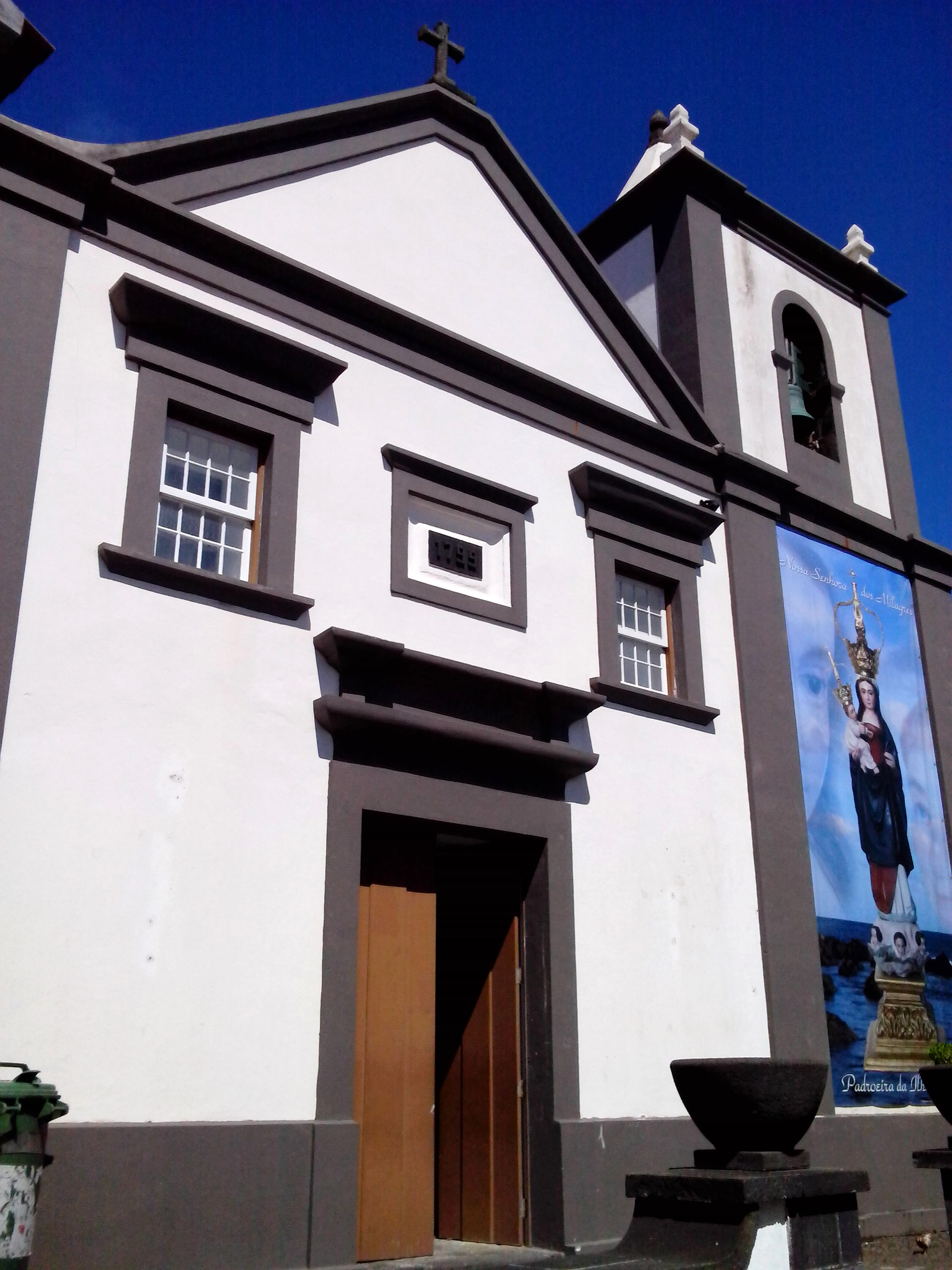
- The front facade of the parochial church of Our Lady of Miracles, during celebrations in her honour

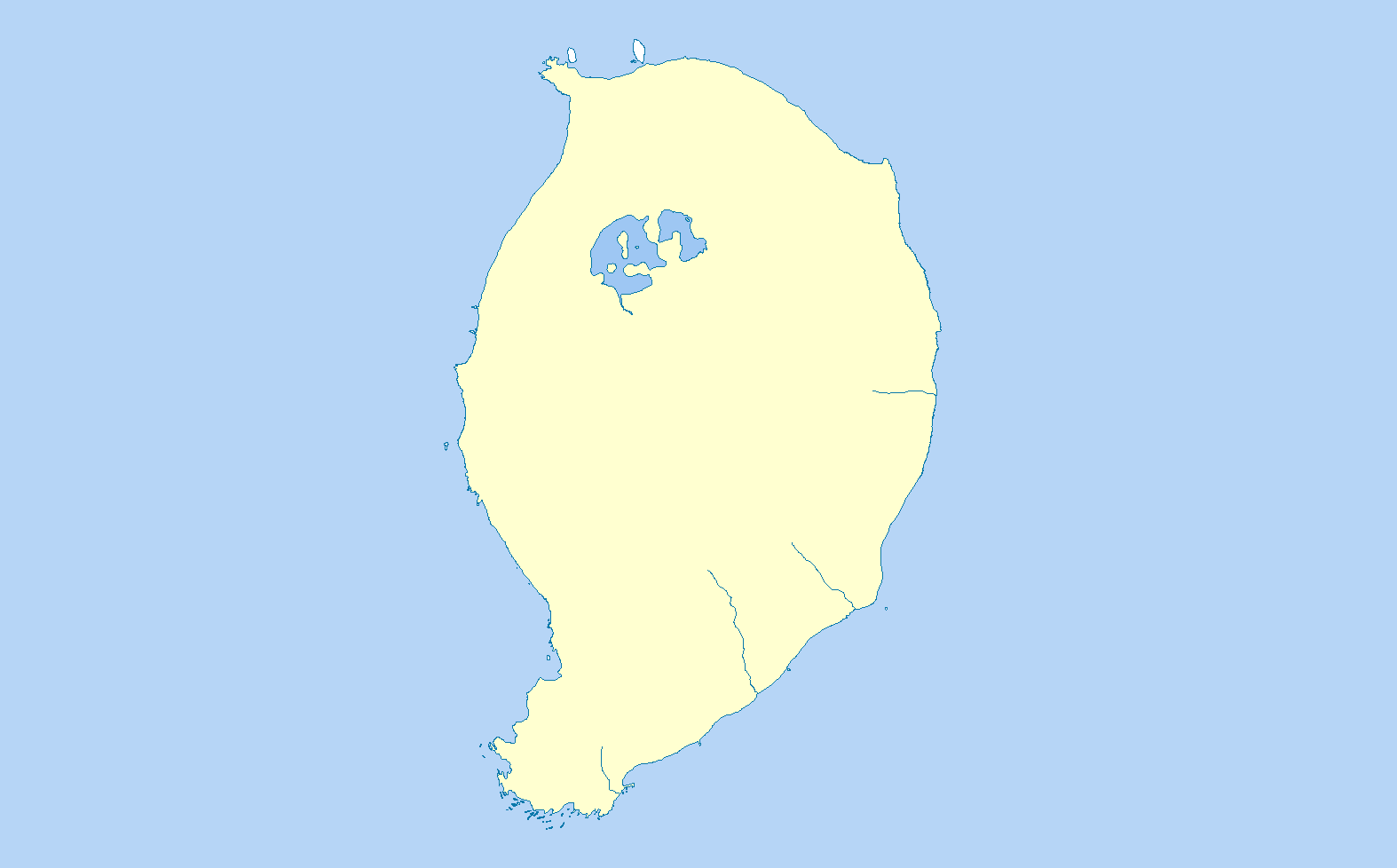
- Location of the church in the municipality of Vila do Corvo
- 39°40′19″N 31°06′42″W
- Location: Corvo, Western, Azores
- Country: Portugal
- Denomination: Roman Catholic

Architecture
- Style: Baroque, Chã

Administration
- Diocese: Diocese of Angra

The Church of Nossa Senhora dos Milagres (Portuguese: Igreja de Nossa Senhora dos Milagres) is a Portuguese 16th-century church located in the municipality of Vila do Corvo, on the island of Corvo in the archipelago of the Azores.

== History ==
It was likely constructed in 1570, to the invocation of Nossa Senhora do Rosário (Our Lady of the Rosary), a small church it was located near the sea.

In 1632, the hermitage was destroyed by Barbary coast pirates. An image of Nossa Senhora do Rosário, which was found in the Canada da Rocha, and legend indicate that this figure saved the island's defenders from the bullets of the pirates.

Corvo was elevated to the status of parish in 1674, under the invocation of Nossa Senhora do Rosário, and the church was rebuilt: a vicar, clergy and treasurer assigned to the new parish. The first vicar was the Faialense Bartolomeu Tristão. It was the second parish priest, the Florentine Inácio Coelho, son of the chronicler friar Diogo das Chagas, who convinced D. Martinho Mascarenhas, second Captain-donatario, to assume the patronage of the parish. It was likely Inácio Coelho who promoted the story of the image of the Virgin Mary and how she saved the people of Corvo from the pirate attack. From this point on the image began to be referred to as Nossa Senhora dos Milagres (Our Lady of Miracles).

In 1795, the church was rebuilt: 26 metres (85 ft) by 7 metres (23 ft).

On 20 June 1832, the population was elevated to the status of vila (town) and seat of the municipality, by Peter IV of Portugal. The decree established that centre would be known as Vila do Corvo, and not under the jurisdiction of Santa Cruz das Flores, for which it did before.

In 1932, the church was destroyed in a violent fire, which resulted in the loss of many of the artifacts, except the image of Nossa Senhora dos Milagres, which was saved. During that year, the church was rebuilt, following the fire.

The Regional Government of the Azores classified the historical centre of Vila do Corvo on 10 April 1997 as an architecture Group of Public Interest, under resolution 69/97 (JORAA 15, 10 April 1997). The Directorate for Culture (Portuguese: Direção Regional da Cultura) initiated a process to classify eight sculptures as religious artifacts of public interest on 15 August 2013, sculptures that dated from the 17th and 18th century. The sculptures include images of Nossa Senhora da Conceição (Our Lady of the Conception), Nossa Senhora dos Milagres (Our Lady of the Miracles), São Bento (Saint Benedict), São Pedro, The Crucifixion and Senhor Morto (Our Lord Dead), all composed by unknown sculpture. The image of the Senhor Morto had been acquired in 1877, while the image of Nossa Senhora dos Milagres, dated to 1570, was executed by in Flanders.

== Architecture ==
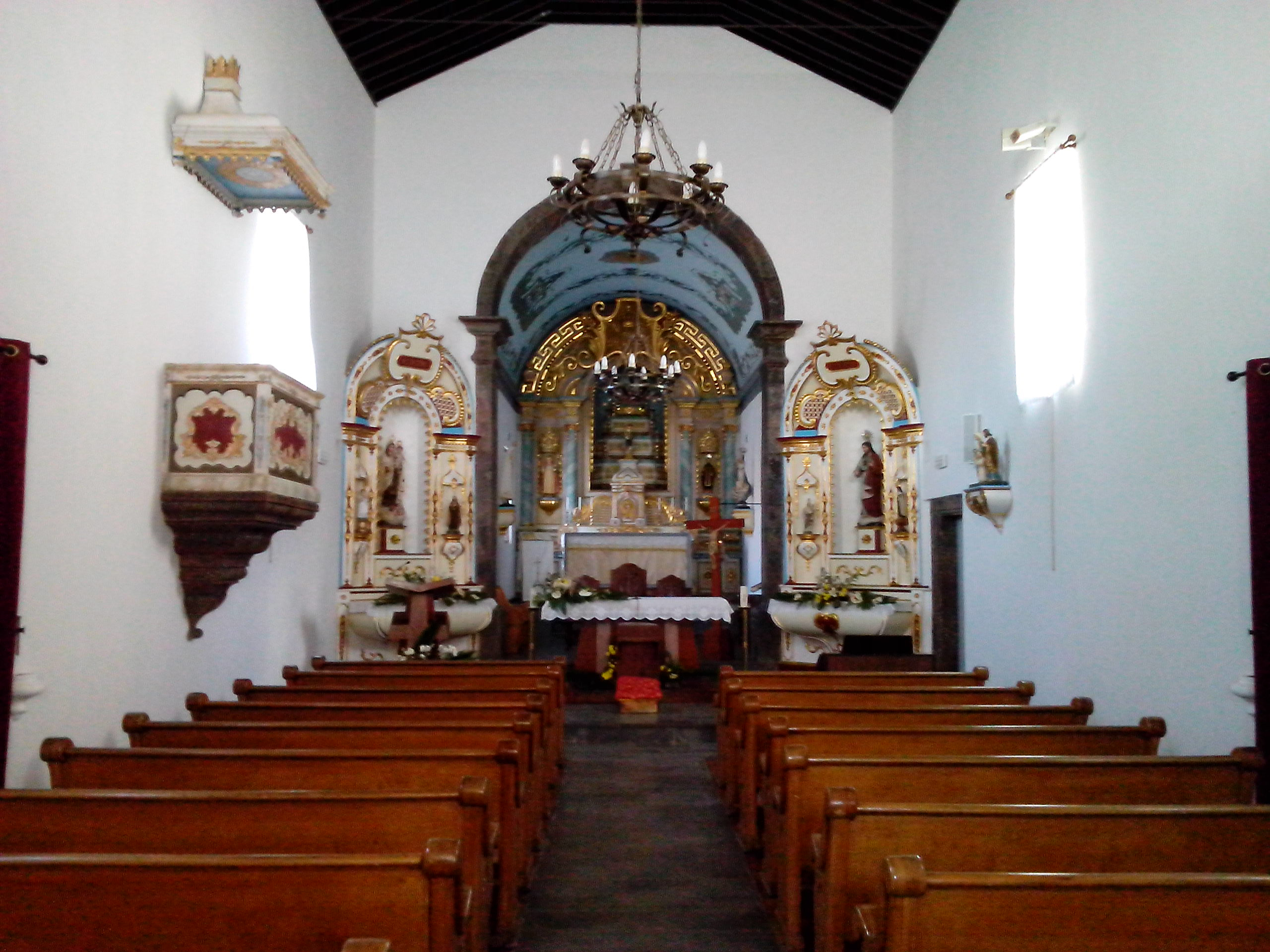
The main altar and chancel of the parochial church

A rectangular plan, the church is composed of a single nave and lower presbytery, with a lateral square bell-tower and various annexes. The spaces are deferentially covered in tile, and facades plastered and painted in white, while the corners, cornices and frames are painted in grey.

The principal facade is oriented towards the southeast, with plastered corners and terminated in a triangular pediment with Latin cross. The front portico, including alternating double frieze and double cornice, is surmounted by a small beam, with a frame terminated in cornice, and two windows framed and surmounted by frieze and cornice. On the left, is two register bell-tower with the second register that includes an arch over pilasters. It is covered by a pyramidal roof, and its corners crowned by pinnacles.

The lateral facades are terminated by friezes and cornices, with rectangular door framed by frieze and cornice and window. The annexes in the lateral facade are oriented towards the southeast with similar entrance.

=== Interior ===
Plastered and painted in white, the interior consists of one nave with wooden ceiling and a presbytery with false vaulted-ceiling in stucco, painted with phytomorphic motifs.

On the left is a rectangular pulpit basin resting on corbels extended inferiorly, with full guard consisting of carved, painted canopy.

The triumphal arch on pilasters, is flanked by carved polychrome altarpieces and concave plant. The presbytery includes a retable of polychromatic and gilded wood, rectangular with three axes defined by columns. The central axis is highlighted by an imaginario over corbels.
