= Corvo (surname) =

Corvo is a surname. It is derived from a nickname is the Italian, Portuguese, and Galician, literally meaning "raven" or "rook", from Latin corvus. In Spanish the word has the meaning "crooked bend" (Latin: curvus) The Spanish variant of "raven" is "Cuervo". Notable people with the surname include:

- Alberto Corvo (born 1963), Italian middle-distance runner
- Alex Corvo, Australian rugby league player and trainer
- Baron Corvo (1860–1913), pseudonym of writer Frederick Rolfe
- Joe Corvo (born 1977), American ice hockey player in the NHL
- Mark Corvo (born 1973), Australian rugby league player
- Massimo Corvo (born 1959), Italian actor
- Rafael E. López-Corvo, Venezuelan-born medical doctor, psychiatrist and psychoanalyst

== See also ==
- Cuervo, the Spanish-language variant
- Corbo (surname), central-southern variant of Italian "corvo"
