= Cuervo =

Cuervo is a Spanish surname literally meaning raven.

== People ==
- Alma Cuervo (born 1951), American actress
- Cayetana Guillén Cuervo (born 1969), Spanish actress and TV presenter
- Dark Cuervo, a.k.a. Jaime Ignacio Tirado Correa (born 1974), Mexican wrestler
- Eduardo Cuervo (born 1977), Mexican actor
- Fernando Guillén Cuervo (born 1963), Spanish actor, film director and scriptwriter
- Gemma Cuervo (1936–2026), Spanish actress
- Rufino José Cuervo (1844–1911), Colombian writer, linguist and philologist

== Other ==
- Jose Cuervo, a brand of tequila
- "José Cuervo" (song), a song about a woman who drinks too much Jose Cuervo tequila

== See also ==
- El Cuervo (disambiguation)
- Corvo (disambiguation)
- Corvus (disambiguation)
