= Estreitinho =

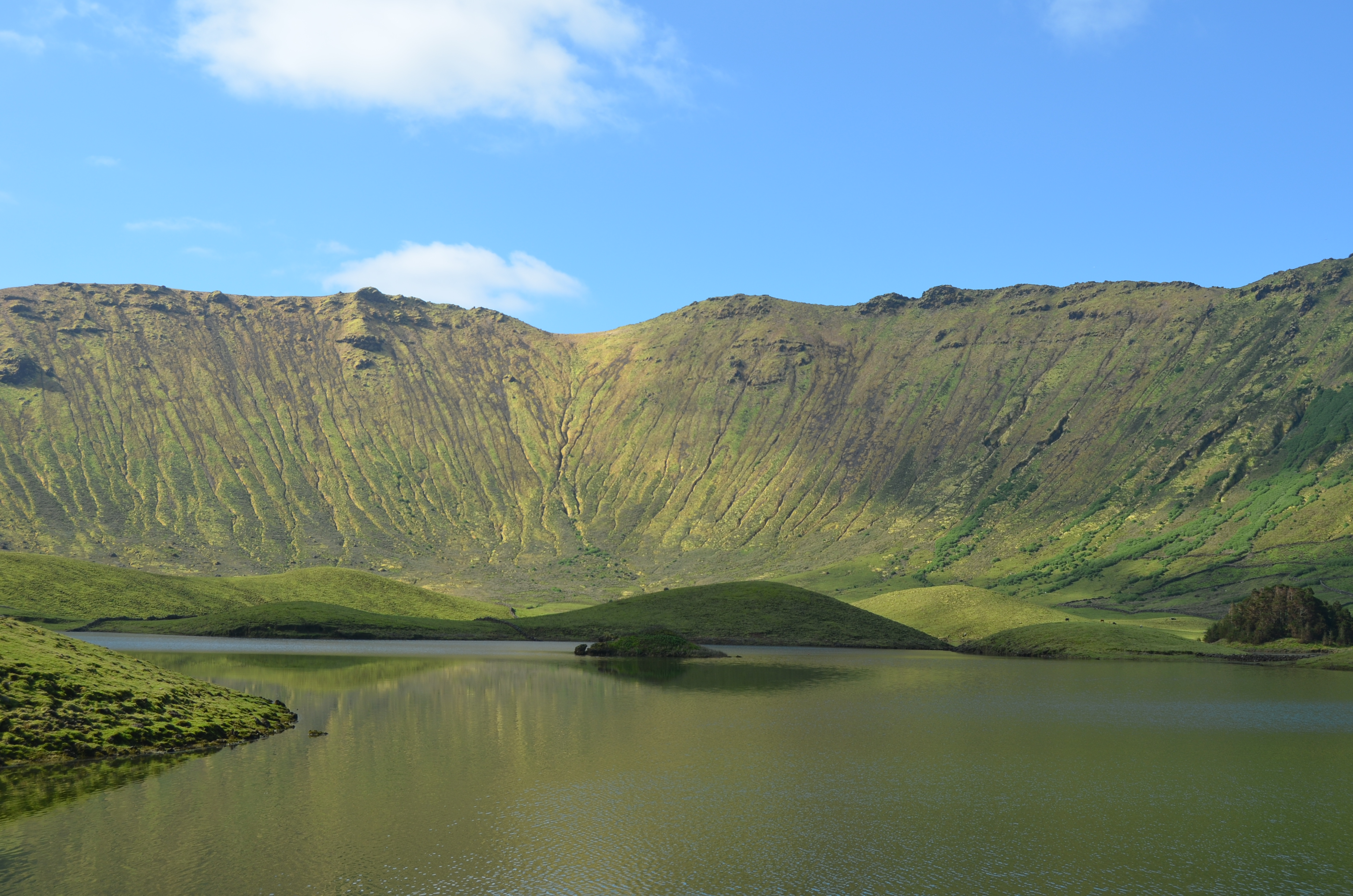
- The peak within Corvo's caldera

Highest point
- Elevation: 718 m (2,356 ft)
- Prominence: 718 m (2,356 ft)
- Coordinates: 39°41′57.9″N 31°06′55″W

Geography
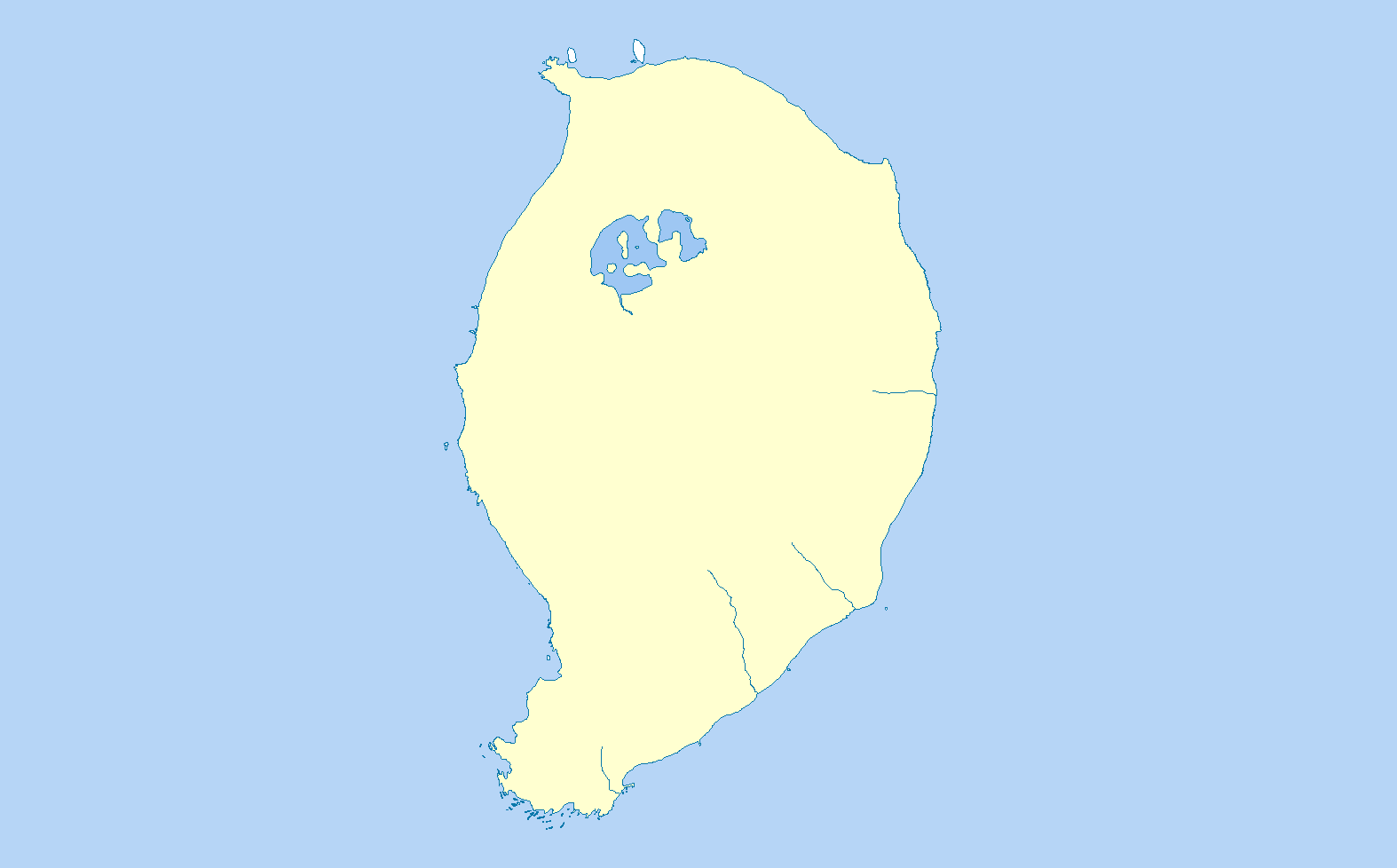
- Location within Corvo Location within Azores
- Location: Corvo, Azores, Portugal

Geology
- Mountain type: Stratovolcano with caldera
- Last eruption: Unknown

Estreitinho or Morro dos Homens is the highest peak on Corvo Island, Azores, Portugal. It measures 718 m (2,356 ft) and is located on the southern rim of Corvo's caldera.

The names used for the peak, Estreitinho (meaning "narrow") and Morro dos Homens (meaning "Hill of Men") are often used interchangeably, although they are sometimes used to describe different peaks, with the latter being the lower summit that one reaches first when going clockwise around the crater rim.
