= Corbo (surname) =

Corbo is a surname. In Italian language it is derived from the nickname corbo, rook, raven a central southern variant of corvo Notable people with the surname include:

- Chris Corbo (born 2004), American football tight end
- Gabriele Corbo (born 2000), Italian footballer
- Mateo Corbo (born 1976), Uruguayan footballer
- Romeo Corbo (born 1952), Uruguayan footballer
- Walter Corbo (born 1949), Uruguayan footballer
