= Corvo, Italy =

Village in Catanzaro, Italy

Coordinates: 38°51′N 16°36′E

Corvo is a village in the province of Catanzaro, in the Calabria region of southern Italy. It lies west of the Viale Magna Grecia.
