= Vila do Corvo =

- Municipality
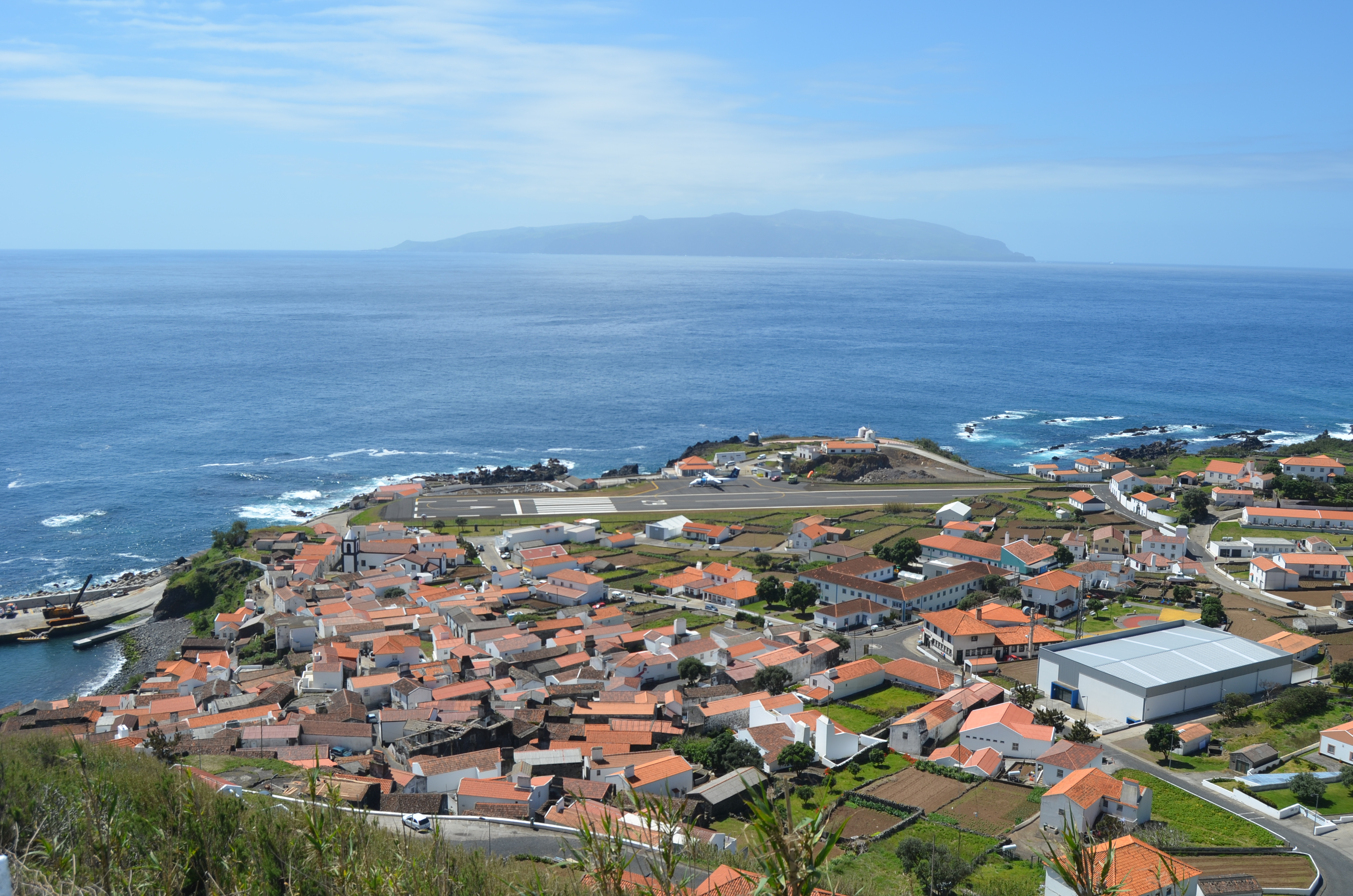
- Vila do Corvo, as seen from Portão lookout, including Aerodrome and settlement

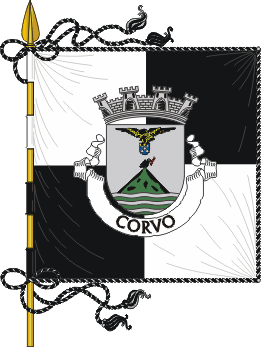
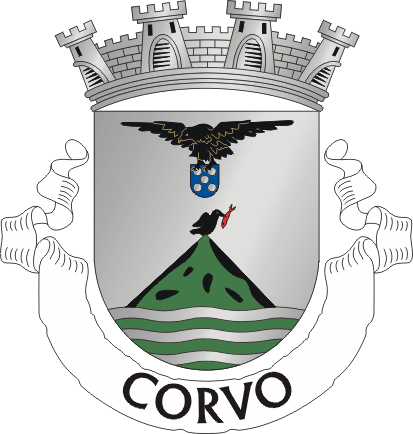
- Flag Coat of arms
- Interactive map of Vila do Corvo
- Coordinates: 39°40′22″N 31°6′52″W
- Country: Portugal
- Auton. region: Azores
- Island: Corvo
- Established: Settlement: c. 1475–1503; Parish: c. 1674; Town/Municipality: June 20, 1832
- Seat: Vila do Corvo Municipal Chamber

Government
  - President: Manuel das Pedras Rita

Area
  - Total: 17.11 km^{2} (6.61 sq mi)
- Elevation: 36 m (118 ft)

Population (2011)
  - Total: 430
  - Density: 25/km^{2} (65/sq mi)
- Time zone: UTC−01:00 (AZOT)
  - Summer (DST): UTC+00:00 (AZOST)
- Postal code: 9980-024
- Area code: (+351) 292 XX XX XX
- Patron: Nossa Senhora dos Milagres
- Local holiday: June 20
- Website: http://www.cm-corvo.pt

Vila do Corvo (Portuguese pronunciation: [ˈkoɾvu]) is the smallest municipality in the Portuguese archipelago of the Azores, constituting the island of Corvo in its entirety. With a population of 430 in 2011, it is the least populated of the Portuguese municipalities, and the only Portuguese municipality, by law, without a civil parish (freguesia, the smallest administrative unit in Portugal). Its area is 17.11 square kilometres (6.61 mi^{2}).

Vila do Corvo has at times been incorrectly referred to as Vila Nova do Corvo. The village, the unique agglomeration on the island of Corvo, is constructed of small homes located along narrow roadways and alleys rising along the hills of the southern one-third of the island. The coastal area of the village is dominated by the Corvo Aerodrome and ports linking the community to the outside world.

== History ==
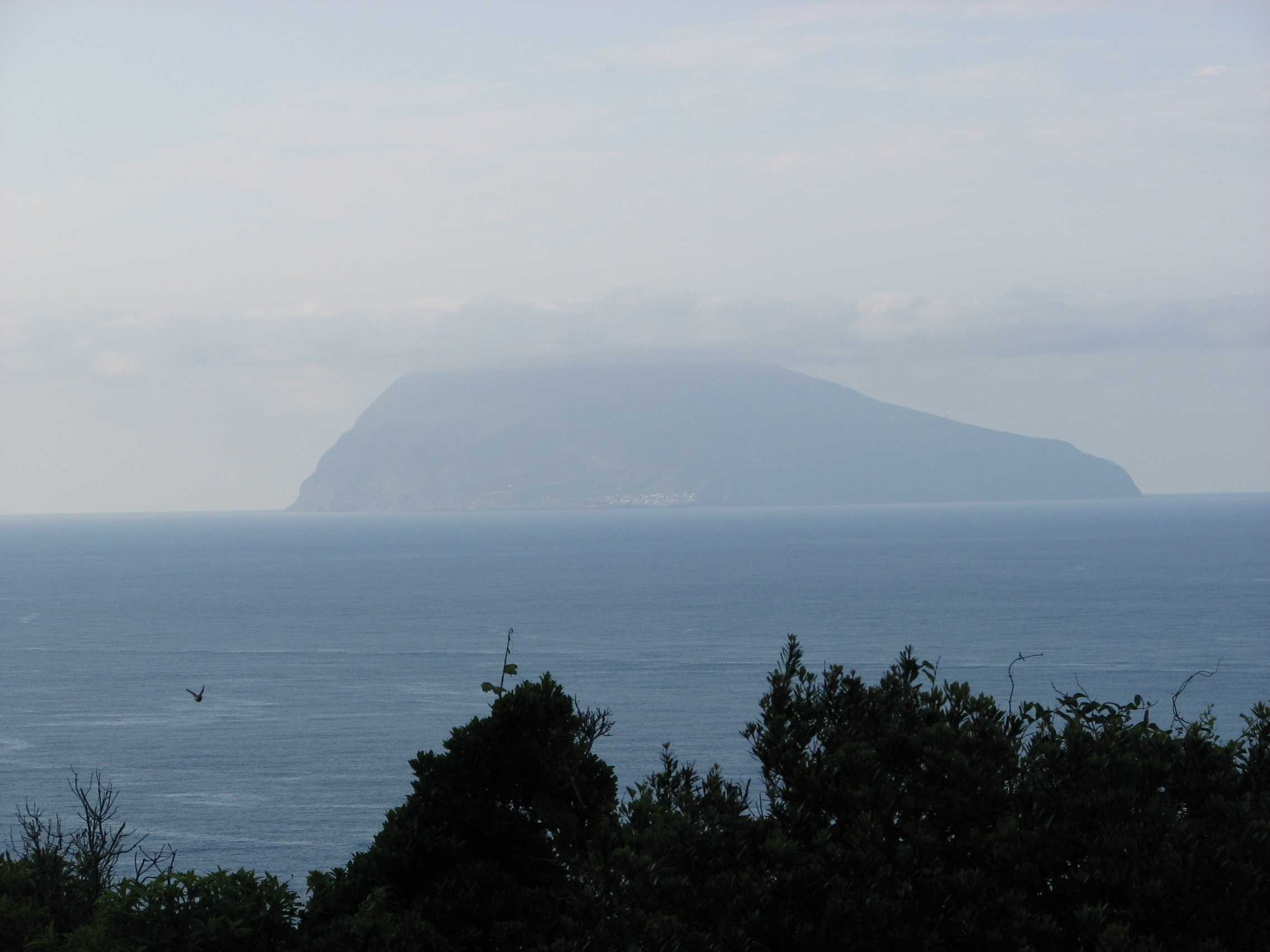
The island of Corvo as seen through the mists across the channel on Flores

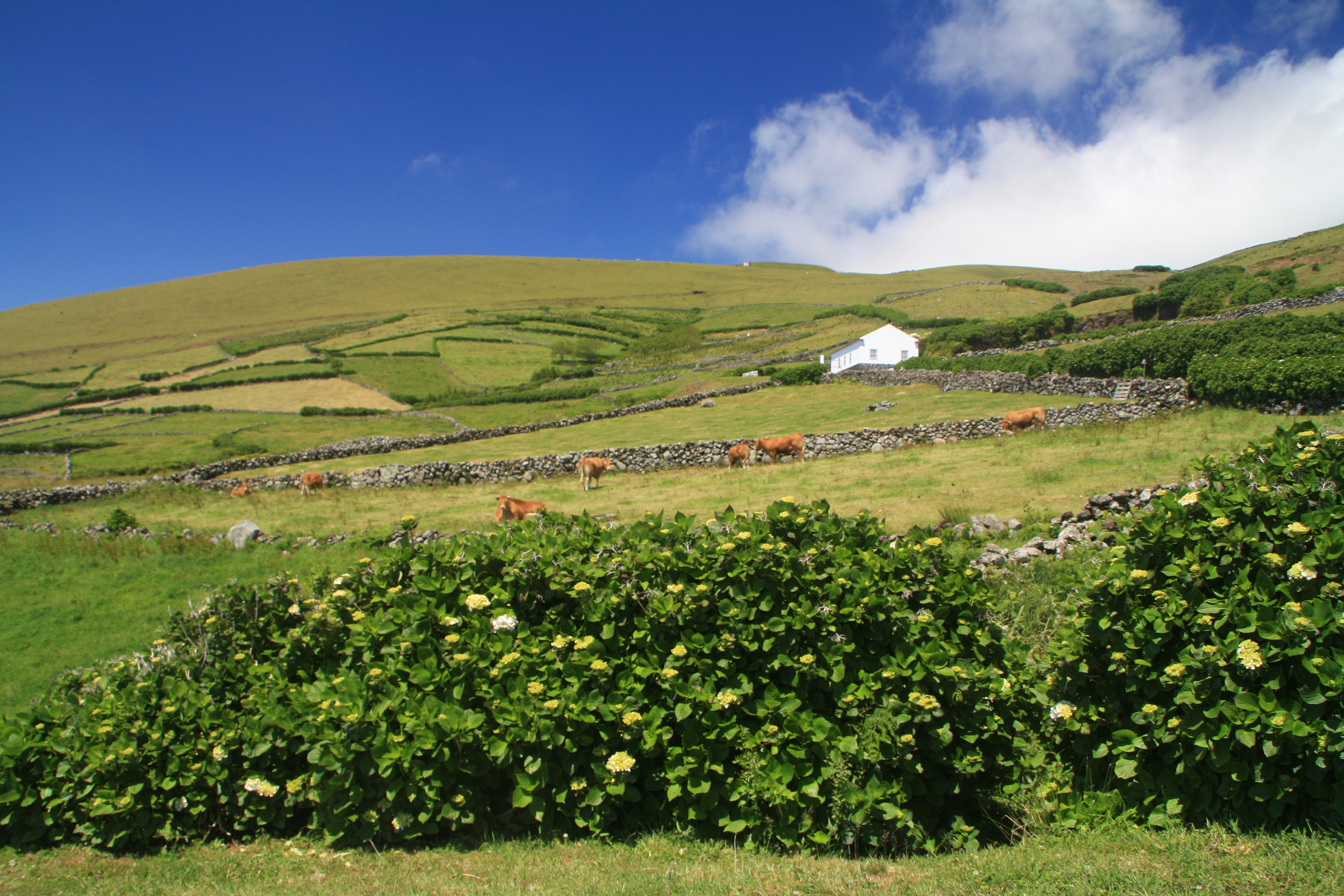
One of the gentler slopes along the eastern coast of the island, around Calçadas

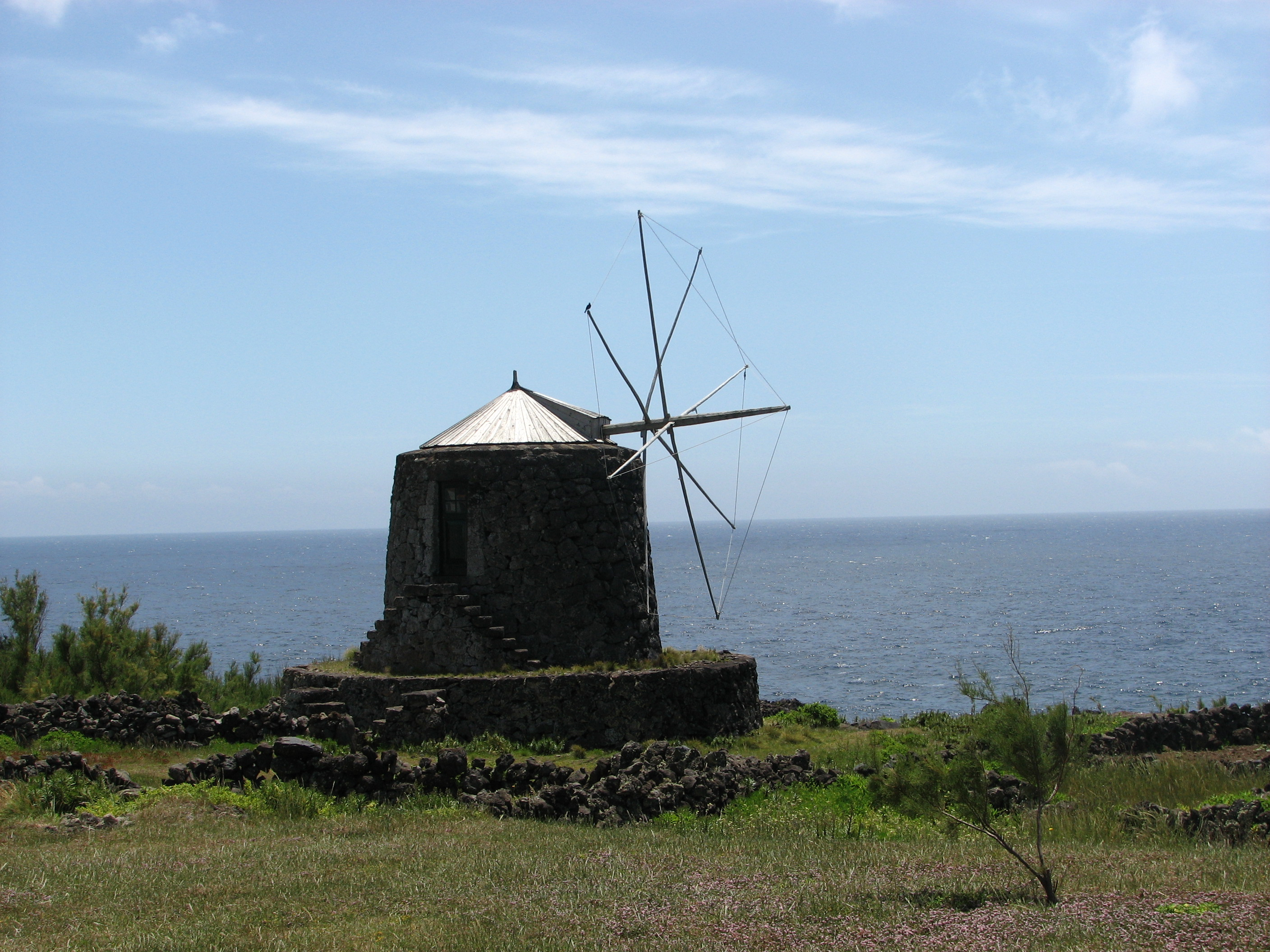
Windmill built in the 19th century

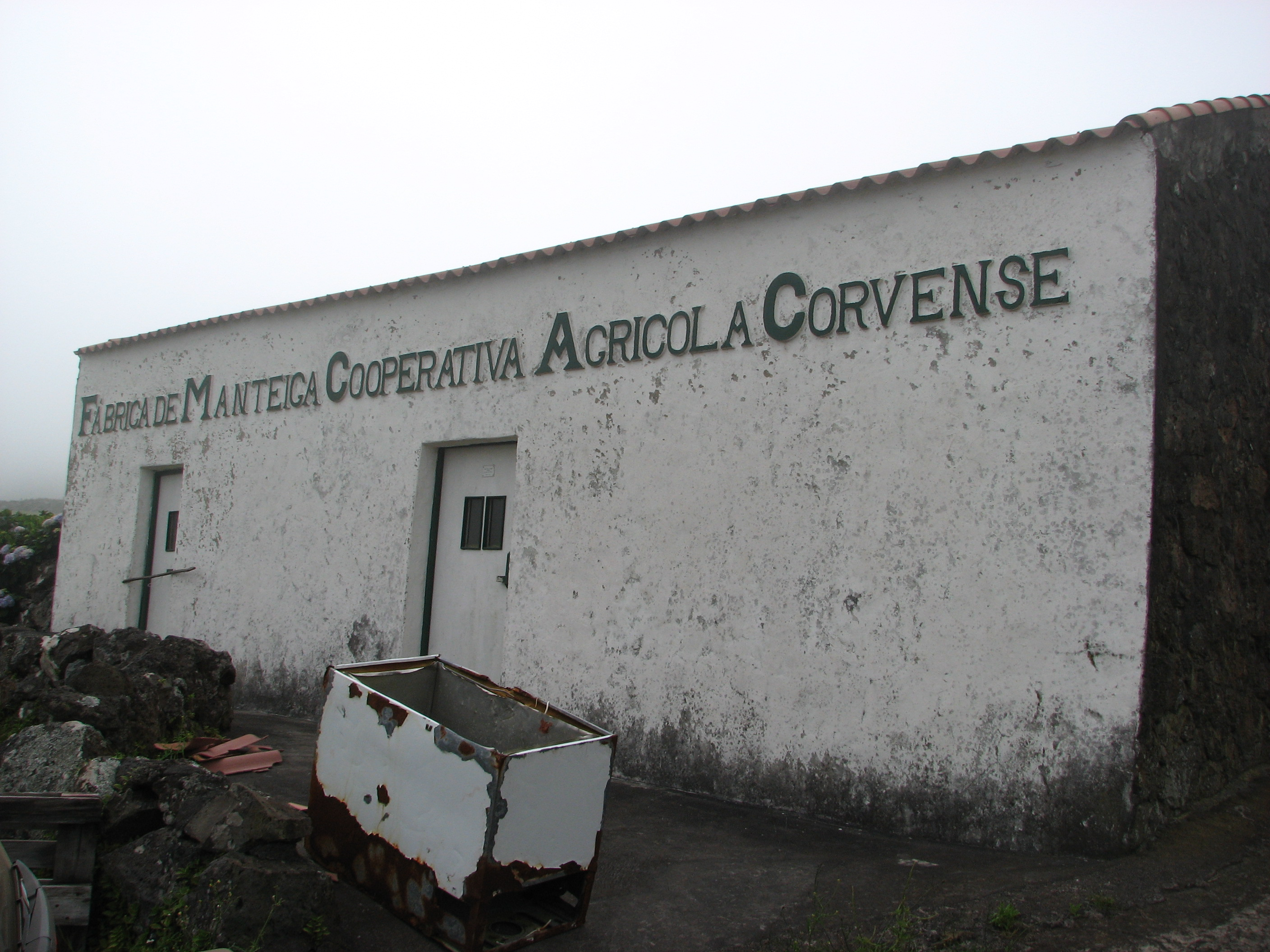
Fabrica da Manteiga Cooperativa Agrícola Corvense, constructed in the early part of the 20th century

Despite the discovery of Carthaginian coins and the possible presence of a pre-Portuguese statue on Corvo, the current historical consensus is that the history of the Azores begins with non-official exploration during the period of the late 13th century in maps, such as the Genoese Medici Atlas (1351). Although it did not specify an island of Corvo, the Medici Atlas did refer to an Insula Corvi Marini ('Island of the Marine Crow'), in a seven-island archipelago. A later Mapa Catalão ('Catalan Map'), from Spain, referred to two islands of Corvo and Flores in 1375.

During Portuguese 'official history' the Western Group was discovered during the navigator Diogo de Teive and his son's (João de Teive) 1452 return from the Banks of Newfoundland, after his second voyage of exploration. The Portuguese Court began to refer to the new Ilhas das Flores ('Islands of Flowers'), identifying Corvo as the Ilha de Santa Iria ('Island of Saint Irene'), but other nautical charts continued to refer to this island as the Ilhéu das Flores ('Islet or Island of Flowers'), Ilha da Estátua ('Island of the Statue'), Ilha do Farol ('Island of the Lighthouse') or Ilha de São Tomás ('Island of Saint Thomas'). The island was placed under the control of Diogo Teive, who became the first Captain-Donatário.

Regardless, it was only in the following year that King Afonso V of Portugal "recognized" these new discoveries (January 20, 1453) and donated them to his uncle, Afonso, Duke of Braganza and Count of Barcelos. The first proprietor showed little interest in settlement, sending only the obligatory cattle to settle the island and establish his legitimate possession.

Fernão Telles, the third Captain-Donatário between 1475 and 1503, was the first to attempt to colonize Corvo (contracting with the Flemish entrepreneur Willem van der Haegen), but abandoned his settlement after a couple of years. By 1507, the islands of both Corvo and Flores were identified by Valentim Fernandes as unpopulated. Diogo das Chagas also referred to an initial settlement of 30 people, under contract of the Terceirenses Antão Vaz and Lopo Vaz de Azevedo (1508–1510), who had little success on Corvo; they eventually returned to Terceira in 1515, leaving António Silveira de Machado in charge. But the settlement did not persist. Following these successive failed attempts to settle the land, Gonçalo de Sousa (second Captain-Donatário of the islands of Corvo and Flores) was authorized to send slaves (likely from the island of Santo Antão in the Cape Verde archipelago) to Flores and Corvo as farmers and cattlemen (November 12, 1548).

In 1570, the building that would later become the Church of Nossa Senhora dos Milagres was constructed.

Around 1580, colonists from Flores arrived on Corvo, and a small self-sufficient, isolated settlement was formed. These Corvinos eked out a meagre existence, dedicating their venture to subsistence crops and grazing sheep and/or goats, along with fishing offshore. Commerce and trade primarily occurred across the channel, but weather conditions restricted maritime connections with the rest of the islands to between March and September. As Gaspar Frutuoso later indicated, by the end of the 16th century the population consisted of houses "...of 20 neighbours, renters and masters' blacks...certain slaves, and married mulattos with slaves...".

Along with Flores, the island passed into the hands of Martinho de Mascarenhas in 1593. But the situation economically became aggravated and desperate: the annual payments to the seigneur increased; (Note: The annual stipend (Portuguese: foro) required the Corvinos to pay the seigneur 40 moios (940 US bushels (33 m^{3})) of wheat and 80,000 réis in woollen fabrics. Since the sheep and goats were the master's possessions, the wool was sold annually to the population.) the local population increased; the connection with the outside world reluctantly forced a level of self-sufficiency; it became impossible to increase the area under cultivation; and there were frequent incursions by English privateers, that marked the conflict during the Iberian Union.

Much like other Azorean communities in the late 16th century, piracy and privateering marked their local history, even as some locals collaborated with or befriended these raiders. In exchange for protection and payments, the islanders provided fresh water, provisions and men, as well as permitting the treatment of the sick and repairing vessels. But in 1587 Corvo was sacked by English privateers who had attacked Lajes das Flores. Then, in 1632, Barbary coast pirates (from the Ottoman Empire) twice attempted to disembark in Porto da Casa, which was only a small bay (and an area that was easily accessible to pirates). In one account, while the men were in the hills looking after their flocks and the women were in their homes, a large group of pirates arrived in the vicinity of the settlement. The pirates fired on the settlement, and were met by rocks thrown from the cliff-tops. During the battle, the local vicar carried his small image of Nossa Senhora do Rosário ('Our Lady of the Rosary') into the battle, and placed it along the Canada da Rocha. The statue had for many years been placed in the area of Porto da Casa, but had been moved to the altar of the small chapel on the cliff. The battle was arduous, but 200 Corvinos were able to defeat the pirates, capturing many weapons, with no loss of life and while capturing a Moor. It is said that the victory was credited to the statue, which depicted the patron saint of Corvo, and had mysteriously deflected many of the pirates' rounds. The pirates retreated and did not return to the small island. Thereafter the statue became known as the statue of Nossa Senhora dos Milagres ('Our Lady of Miracles'). It was the second parish priest, the Florentine Inácio Coelho (brother of the Diogo das Chagas), who was able to convince Martinho de Mascarenhas (the second Captain-Donatário) to assist the parish "in the name of the Virgin Mary". Today the statue is located in the parochial church.

The parish of Corvo was created in 1674: its first pastor was the Faialense Bartolomeu Tristão. Until this time the colony was annually visited by a priest from Santa Cruz das Flores, sent by the Bishop of Angra to tend to the isolated community.

In the 18th century, American whalers arrived in Flores to recruit crews and harpooners, and to re-provision their ships for their campaigns. Due to their experience, inhabitants from Corvo signed onto these crews, thus beginning a close relationship with the New England community of North America that would continue into the 20th century (at times, this connection was more direct than its connection to Lisbon). Consequently, clandestine emigration was a constant of life, and a problem for the repressive Portuguese authorities, who were preoccupied with defections from obligatory military service and reductions in the island's tribute. The settlers on Corvo were obliged to pay a tithe to their Captains-Donatário, and after 1759 (with the death of the 8th Duke of Aveiro and Count of Santa Cruz), to the Crown. During the Liberal Wars, a delegation from Corvo approached Regent Peter IV of Portugal to present the grave sentiments of the population and request that their payments be alleviated. Manuel Tomás de Avelar, chief of the Corvino delegation, traveled to Angra do Heroísmo to petition the liberal leadership of the Angra Regency. It was Mouzinho da Silveira who attempted to mitigate this servitude with a proposal to reduce the tithe payment (in wheat) and taxes, owing to the persistent poverty on the island. A decree was promulgated on May 14, 1832, by Peter IV and signed in Ponta Delgada, which reduced the tithe paid to the Crown's Donatário (then Pedro José Caupers) in half (to 20 moios [470 US bushels (17 m^{3})] of wheat), as well as the elimination of the annual payment of 80,000 réis. The Crown would then assume the indemnity of the Donatário. The tribute was completely abolished by 1835.

On June 20, 1832, the Regent, Peter IV of Portugal, elevated the settlement of Corvo to the status of village and municipal seat. Until this time, Corvo had been under the jurisdiction of Santa Cruz das Flores as a civil parish of its neighbor across the channel. And after 1853, the foral (the town's royal charter) granted to the dual jurisdiction was extinguished, resulting in a liberal movement, where tenant farmers were able to raise their cattle and till their own lands, marking out a subsistence economy that supported porting ships.

In 1886 the Civil Governor of the District of Horta, Manuel Francisco de Medeiros, asked the inhabitants what they wanted on visiting the community. He was surprised by the humble request for a Portuguese national flag for the island. It came into use when Albert of Monaco visited the island during his oceanographic and photographic expeditions. It was also visited in 1924 by the Portuguese writer Raul Brandão, who contributed to local myths and idyllic republican community with his work Ilhas Desconhecidas.

From the beginning of the 19th and into the 20th century, emigration continued unabated, except for a period between 1925 and 1955, as more Corvinos left the island in search of economic security—a process that continued well into the 1980s. By 1938, the island received its first permanent medical resident, João Rodrigues Ferreira da Silva, who lived on the island until 1945, and for whom the only medical building was named.

On April 10, 1997, the urban nucleus of the village of Corvo consisted primarily of the old one and two-storey house/barns that populated the centre of the municipality and were classified as an 'architectural group of public interest' (Portuguese: Conjunto de Interesse Público) by the Regional Government of the Azores, supported by IGESPAR.

== Geography ==
=== Climate ===
Vila do Corvo has a humid subtropical climate (Cfa) with warm summers and mild winters. Despite being at the same latitude, Vila do Corvo is on average 5 °C (9.0 °F) warmer than Long Beach Island, New Jersey, mainly due to the effect of the Gulf Stream.

Climate data for Corvo Airport, 1971-1981
Month	Jan	Feb	Mar	Apr	May	Jun	Jul	Aug	Sep	Oct	Nov	Dec	Year
Mean daily maximum °C (°F)	16.2 (61.2)	15.8 (60.4)	16.2 (61.2)	17.0 (62.6)	18.7 (65.7)	21.0 (69.8)	23.8 (74.8)	25.0 (77.0)	23.8 (74.8)	21.0 (69.8)	19.1 (66.4)	17.2 (63.0)	19.6 (67.2)
Daily mean °C (°F)	14.3 (57.7)	13.7 (56.7)	14.1 (57.4)	15.0 (59.0)	16.6 (61.9)	18.8 (65.8)	21.4 (70.5)	22.4 (72.3)	21.5 (70.7)	18.8 (65.8)	17.1 (62.8)	15.3 (59.5)	17.4 (63.3)
Mean daily minimum °C (°F)	12.3 (54.1)	11.7 (53.1)	12.0 (53.6)	13.0 (55.4)	14.4 (57.9)	16.6 (61.9)	19.0 (66.2)	19.9 (67.8)	19.1 (66.4)	16.7 (62.1)	15.1 (59.2)	13.4 (56.1)	15.3 (59.5)
Average rainfall mm (inches)	118.3 (4.66)	124.7 (4.91)	95.1 (3.74)	75.8 (2.98)	61.6 (2.43)	53.7 (2.11)	59.0 (2.32)	74.2 (2.92)	89.1 (3.51)	106.2 (4.18)	124.6 (4.91)	120.1 (4.73)	1,102.4 (43.4)
Source: Instituto de Meteorologia

=== Human geography ===
Population of Vila do Corvo (1849–2011)
Year	Pop.	±%
1842	800	—
1864	883	+10.4%
1871	887	+0.5%
1878	880	−0.8%
1890	806	−8.4%
1900	808	+0.2%
1911	746	−7.7%
1920	661	−11.4%
1930	676	+2.3%
1940	691	+2.2%
1950	728	+5.4%
1960	681	−6.5%
1970	485	−28.8%
1981	370	−23.7%
1991	393	+6.2%
2001	425	+8.1%
2011	430	+1.2%

The Vila do Corvo is implanted along the maritime coast of the island of Corvo, and represents the only inhabited settlement on the island. With a perimeter of 17 kilometres (11 mi), the settlement is dominated by the sheer cliffs of the extinct volcanic crater of the Caldeirão, which extend 718 metres (2,356 ft) above sea level. The urban area covers an incredibly small 6.5 metres (21 ft) by 3 metres (9.8 ft) on an ancient debris field in the south, along the cove of Nossa Senhora do Rosário. The landscape north of the settlement is characterized by agricultural fields and pastureland, divided by stone walls.

In the last part of the 19th century, a 9% drop in the population marked a period of emigration to the United States, generally associated with most of the archipelago. Yet continued emigration between Corvo and New England would mark the demographic oscillation during the 20th century, as well. There were four identifiable periods:

- the first period, until 1925, when the United States began restricting immigration and the local population diminished by 18%
- the second period, until 1955, during a period of emigration to Latin America, (principally to Brazil) that was fairly insignificant, but resulted in a 10% increase in the population
- a third period, which lasted until the beginning of the 1980s, coincident with a new wave of emigration, resulting in a 49% decrease in the local residents
- finally, from the 1980s until the beginning of the 21st century, resulting from new restrictions on emigration, and local social and economic development, that resulted in little change

In the last 14 years that population has seen a 12.5% increase, which is attributed to the following factors:

- the return of émigrés
- the appearance of new employment opportunities, in addition to the creation of a basic education primary school, which helped to fix the young population

== Economy ==
Generally, the inhabitants dedicate themselves to fishing, agriculture, or raising cattle. Most services on the island support these activities, as well as annual tourism.

Although the island is small, the municipal government constructed a small campsite in the area of Praia da Areia, with washrooms, barbecues and picnic tables in order to support annual eco-friendly visitors to the island.

== Architecture ==
The centre of Vila do Corvo, situated in the eastern part of the Rua da Matriz and characterized by a group of narrow roads, alleyways and a labyrinth of buildings, is the historic town. The buildings are generally two-storey, south-facing, tile-roofed constructions. Some of these buildings continue to have spaces for pig-pens, corrals and annexes aligned to the alleyways.

=== Public buildings ===
- Correios, Telégrafos e Telefones (CTT) Building (Portuguese: Edifício dos Correios, Telégrafos e Telefones, CTT, do Corvo), common on many of the islands of the Azores, the CTT building is a 20th-century construction located in the Largo do Ribeirão
- Pit of Junça (Portuguese: Cova de Junça), a subterranean silo in the form of an amphora, used to store cereals, constructed in the 18th century
- Lighthouse of Ponta Negra (Portuguese: Farol de Ponta Negra), located west of the small port of Boqueirão, alongside the windmills of Corvo, it was established in 1910 to secure the southern coast of the island
- Public Office Building (Portuguese: Edifício das Repartições Públicas do Corvo), the building of the antique public finances for the island of Corvo, built during the 20th century
- Residence of Mariana Lopes (Portuguese: Casa de Mariana Lopes)
- Threshing Circle (Avenida Nova) (Portuguese: Eira de Avenida Nova)
- Windmills of Corvo (Portuguese: Moinhos de Vento) – a group of three windmills located along the Caminhos dos Moinhos (Windmill Ways), constructed of volcanic rock in a conical form, with a wooden roof and octagonal sails, accessed by elevated doorways with volcanic lateral symmetrical steps

=== Religious structures ===
- Church of Nossa Senhora dos Milagres (Portuguese: Igreja Paroquial de Vila Nova do Corvo/Igreja de Nossa Senhora dos Milagres), the 18th-century parish church constructed in 1570 and remodelled in the Baroque style, which houses the legendary image of Our Lady of the Miracles who "miraculously" saved the Corvinos from pirate attacks during the 16th century
- Império of the Divino Espirito Santo (Portuguese: Casa do Divino Espírito Santo), a simple rectangular building used for celebrations tied to the Cult of the Holy Spirit, constructed around 1871

== Culture ==
The island celebrates annual celebrations marking the feast day of its patron saint, Our Lady of Miracles (Portuguese: Nossa Senhora dos Milagres), on August 15. The event is actually a week-long religious celebration of prayer, with an evening candle-light procession on the evening of August 14, before the events on August 15, which include a solemn mass. Connected with this celebration is the annual Festival dos Moinhos (literally, Festival of the Windmills), a secular musical event that attracts tourists and returning emigrants to the tiny island, featuring local and popular musical talent.
