= El Cuervo =

El Cuervo or Los Cuervos (plural) may refer to:

- El Cuervo, Aragon, a municipality located in the province of Teruel, Aragon, Spain
- El Cuervo de Sevilla, a municipality in Seville, Spain
- El Cuervo, a town in Santa Ana Maya, Mexico
- El Cuervo, a town 20 miles from Ensenada Ensenada Municipality, Baja California to the SSE
- Los Cuervos, a nickname of San Lorenzo de Almagro, an Argentine football club
- Los Cuervos Formation, Paleocene geologic formation in Colombia

== See also ==
- Cuervo (disambiguation)
