= Lighthouse of Ponta Negra =

Lighthouse of Ponta Negra Farolim da Ponta Negra
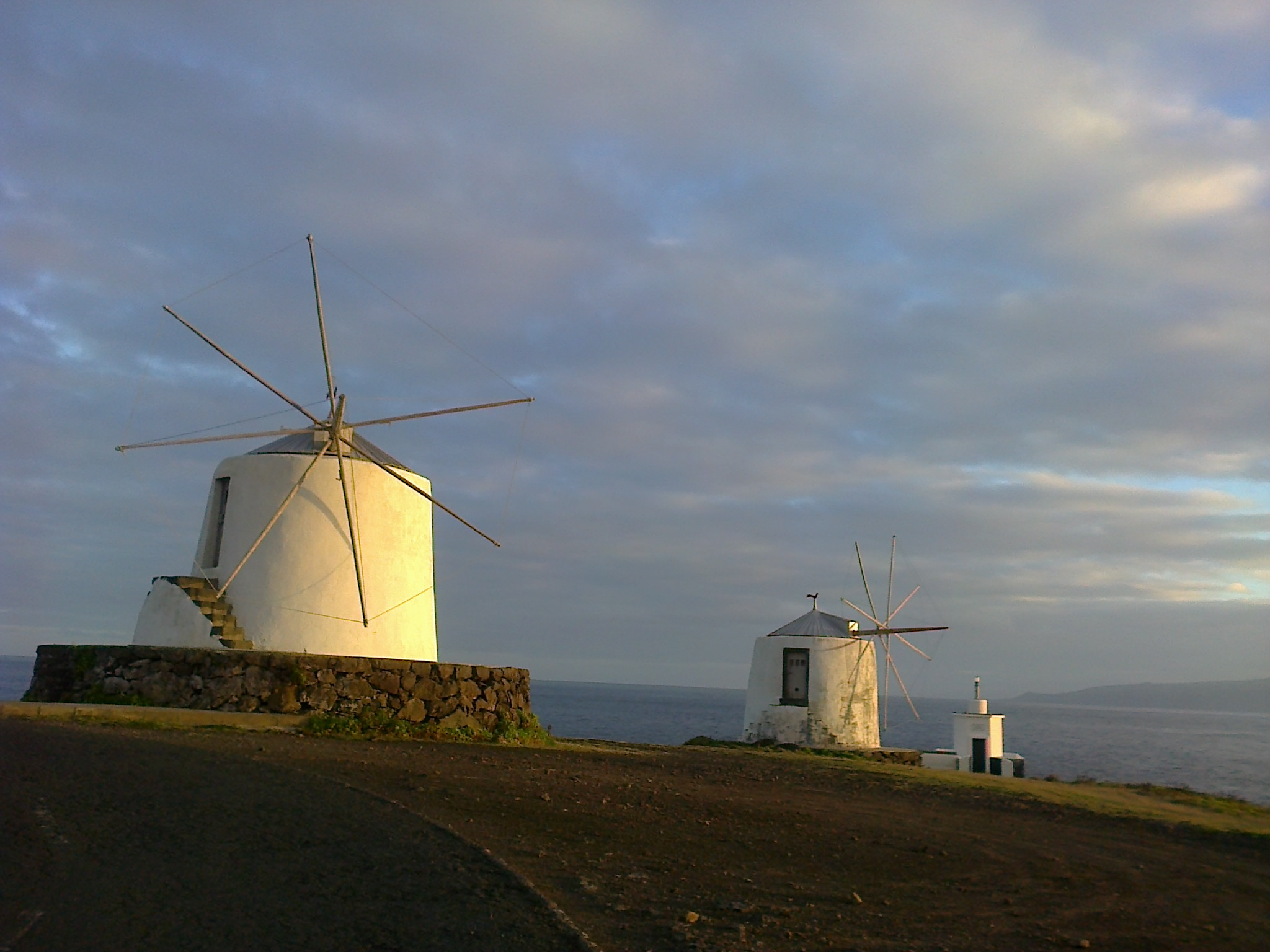
- Location: (Portugal) Corvo, Vila do Corvo
- Coordinates: 39°40′11.74″N 31°6′52.73″W

Tower
- Constructed: 1910
- Construction: concrete tower
- Automated: February 1987
- Height: 3 metres (9.8 ft)
- Shape: hexagonal tower with balcony and beacon
- Markings: white tower
- Power source: mains electricity
- Operator: Directorate for Lighthouses (Direcção de Faróis)
- Heritage: Unclassified

Light
- Focal height: 22 metres (72 ft)
- Range: 6 nmi (11 km)
- Characteristic: Fl W 5s.

The Lighthouse of Ponta Negra (Portuguese: Farolim da Ponta Negra) is a beacon/lighthouse located along the cliffs of promontory of Ponta Negra, in the municipality of Vila do Corvo, on the Portuguese island of Corvo, in the archipelago of the Azores.

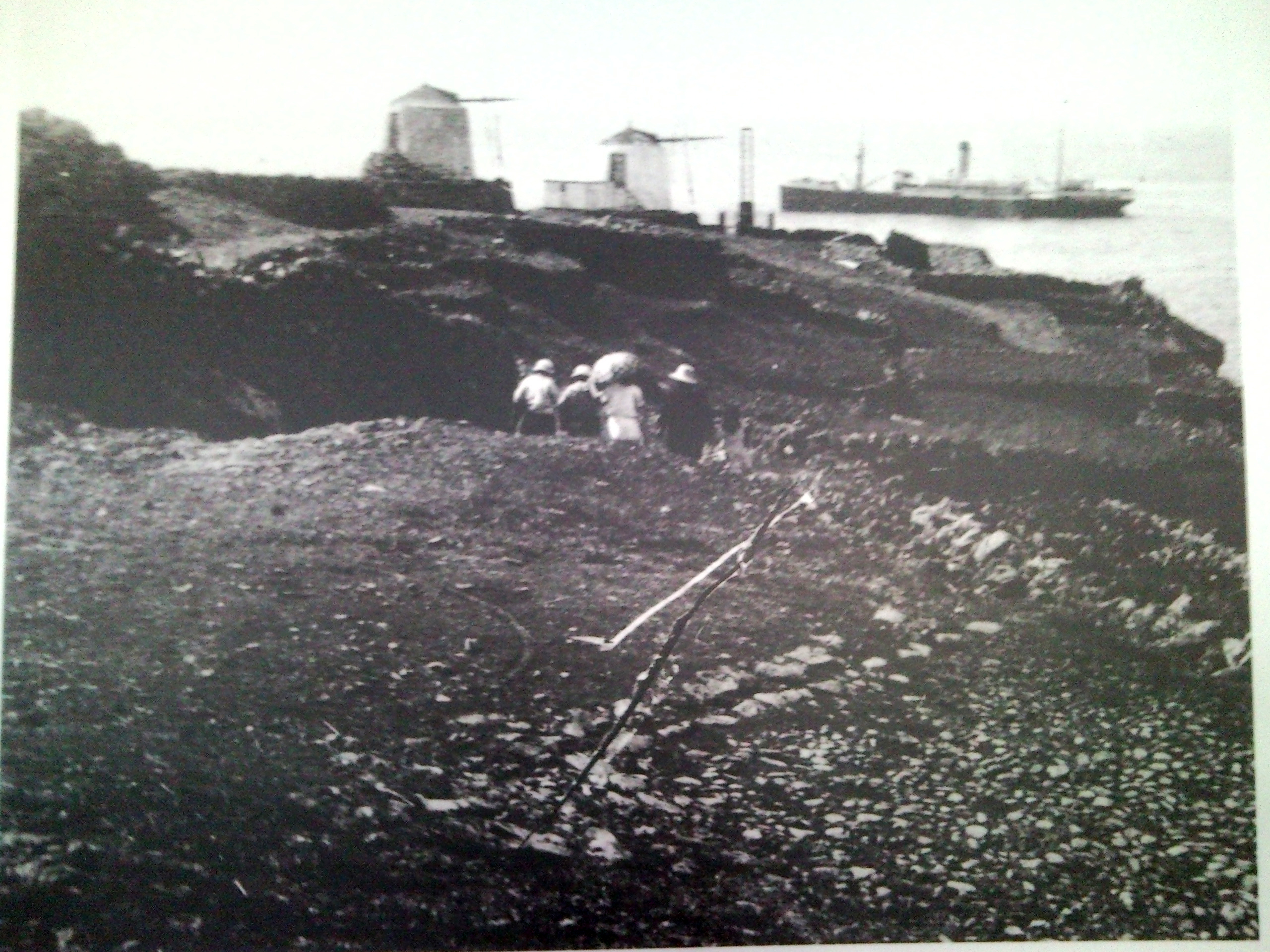
An agrarian view of Ponta Negra

== See also ==
- List of lighthouses in Portugal
