= Corvos =

Portuguese band

- Origin: Portuguese
- Genres: Classical, Rock, Pop
- Members: Pedro Teixera da Silva - violin Tiago Flores - violin Luis Santos - viola Pedro Silva "Pita" - drum kit

Corvos is a Portuguese band. Corvos is unusual within the Portuguese music scene as it consists of a string quartet that plays mostly rock songs. Corvos mixes instrumental elements, classical origins, rock, contemporary pop music and other musical genres.

Corvos is Portuguese for crows.

== Members ==
It is a string quartet constituted by Pedro Teixeira da Silva (violin), Tiago Flores (violin) and Luis Santos (viola). With the release of their fourth album, The Jinx, Corvos included a drummer in its lineup.

== Discography ==
Singles

- Futuro que era Brilhante (2001)

Albums

- Corvos Visitam Xutos (1999)
- Post Scriptum (2001)
- Corvos 3 (2003)
- The Jinx (2007)
- Medo (2010)
