= Diogo de Teive =

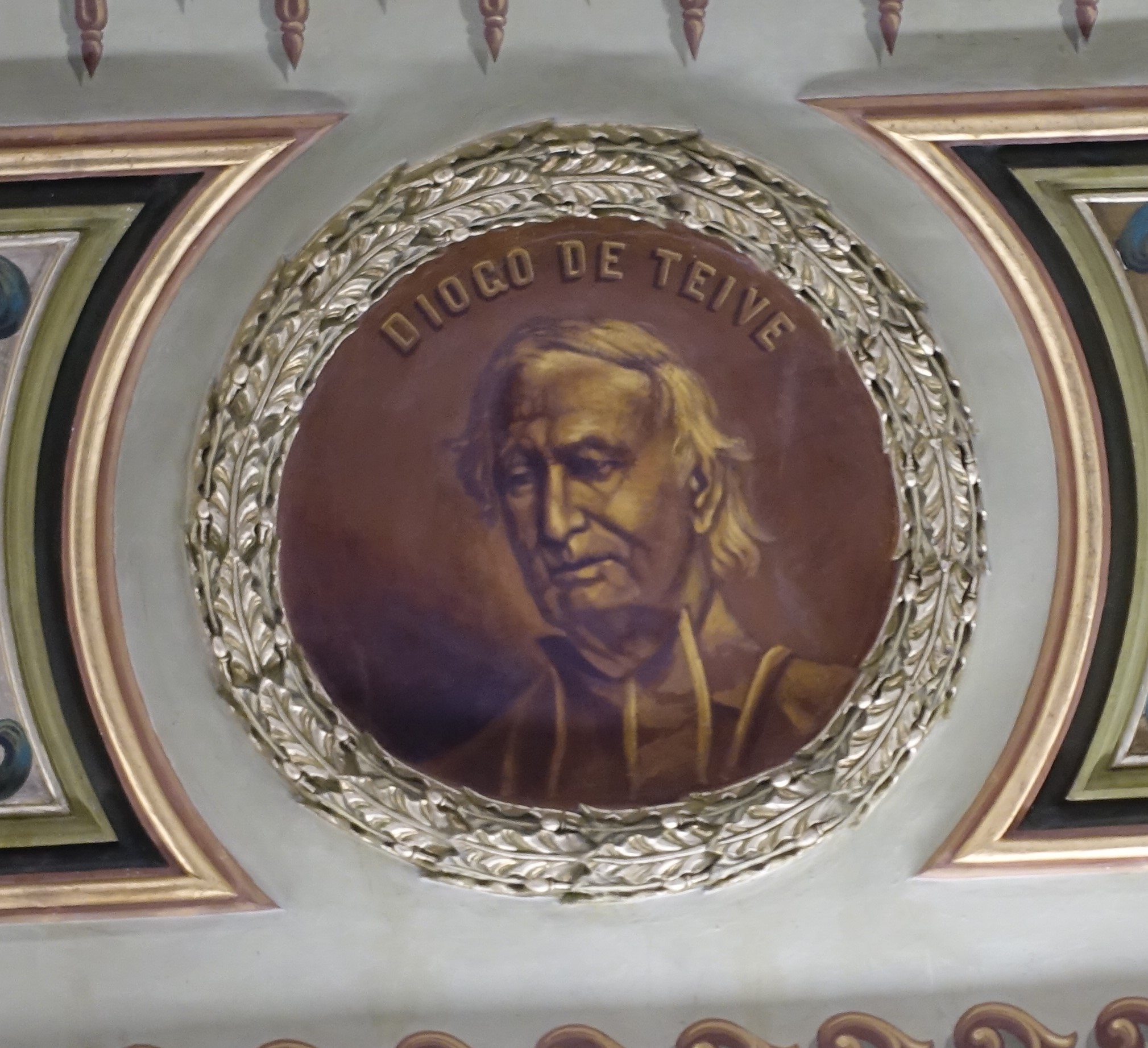
- Occupations: Captain; explorer
- Years active: 1451–1472

Diogo de Teive (fl. 1451 – c. 1472) was a maritime captain and squire to the House of Infante D. Henrique during the Portuguese period of discovery. Following his exploration into the western Atlantic in the area of Newfoundland, in 1452 he discovered the western islands of the archipelago of the Azores: for his efforts he was appointed Donatary for the islands of Flores and Corvo.

== Voyage ==
On 1 January 1451, he disembarked on the island of Terceira in the Azores from which he made his base. He realized two voyages of exploration to the west of the archipelago (which then only included the Central and Eastern Groups). In 1452, at the end of his second voyage, he discovered the islands of Flores and Corvo, which he initially believed were a new archipelago, naming them the Ilhas Floreira (or literally, the Flowered Islands), due to the abundance of flowering plants.

On 5 December 1452, for his discovery, he was given a concession in the sugar cane industry on the island of Madeira by Infante D. Henrique.

Some historians claim that he was responsible for the disappearance of the first Captain-Major of the Captaincy of Flores, although unproven.

== Later life ==
By 1472, he had settled in Ribeira Brava, and along with his son (João de Teive) maintained the donatary rights to the islands until 1474, when D. Fernão Teles de Meneses (married to D. Maria de Vilhena) bought those rights over the islands.

The Teive family and their descendants have had an important history in the community of Ribeira Brava, including: Gaspar de Teive (16th Century), D. Aleixo de Teive (16th century), friar António de Teive (theologist and monk in the Order of St. Augustine, prior of Castelo Branco and Vila Viçosa), Baltazar de Teive (16th century), and also another Diogo de Teive, born in the 18th century ("page and gentleman of King Phillip").
