= Corvo Airport =

Airport in Vila do Corvo in the Azores

Corvo Airport Aeródromo de Corvo
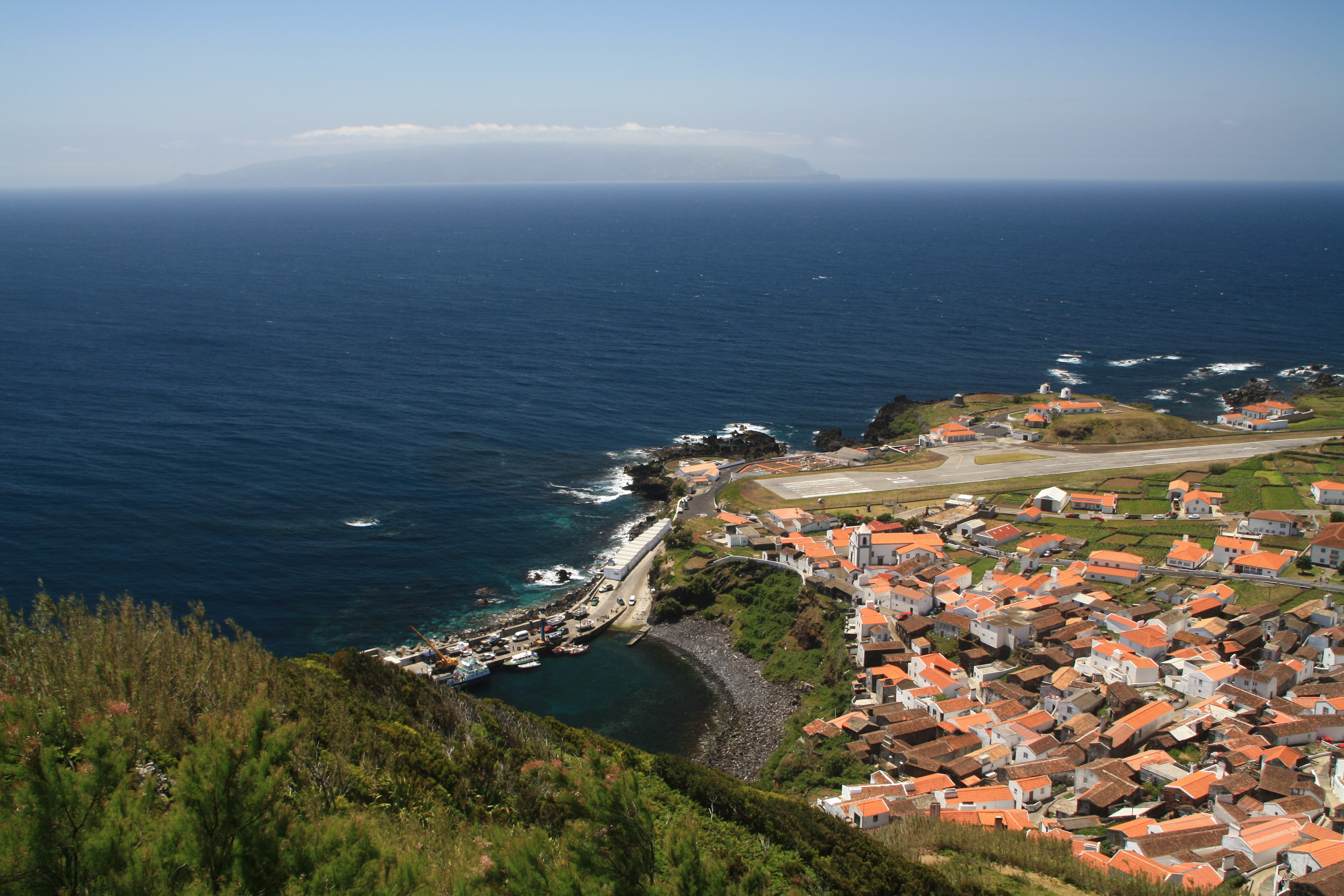
- The aerodrome on the island of Corvo, showing its place on the edge of the coast
- IATA: CVU; ICAO: LPCR

Summary
- Airport type: Public
- Owner: Azores
- Operator: SATA Aeródromes
- Serves: Vila do Corvo
- Location: Vila do Corvo
- Elevation AMSL: 20 m (66 ft)
- Coordinates: 39°40′15″N 031°06′46″W

Map
- Location in the Azores

Runways
Direction	Length		Surface
Direction	m	ft	Surface
11/29	800	2,625	Asphalt

Statistics (2016)
- Passengers: 7110
- Movements: 288
- Sources: Portuguese AIP; Statistics: SATA Aeródromes

Corvo Airport (Portuguese: Aeródromo do Corvo, IATA: CVU, ICAO: LPCR) is an airport in the village of Vila do Corvo on the island of Corvo, in the Portuguese archipelago of the Azores. It is owned by the Regional Government of the Azores, but managed by SATA Air Açores.

== History ==
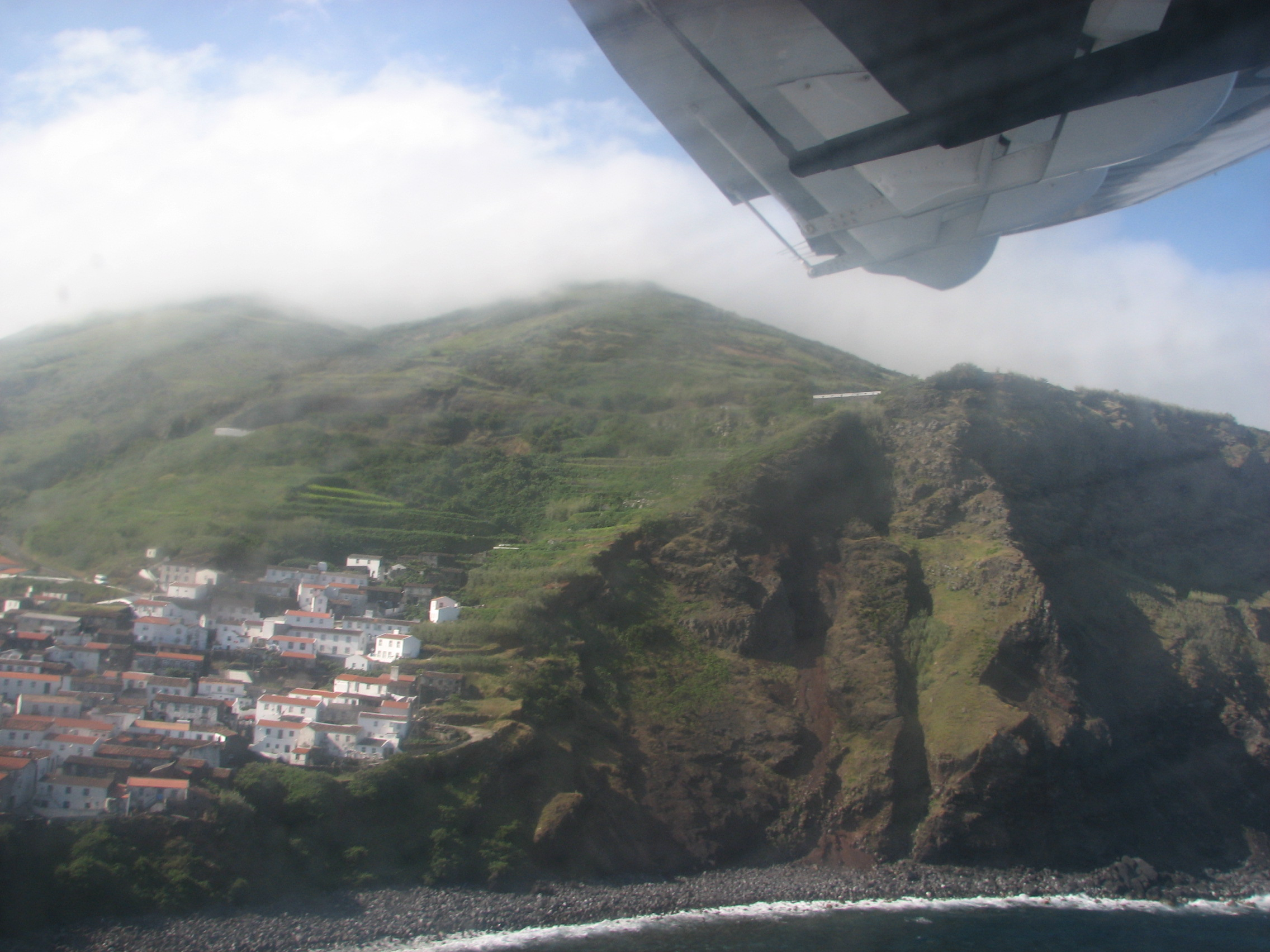
The wing of an old SATA Air Açores Dornier 228 (out of service since fleet modernization), after departure from Corvo Aerodrome

Opened on 12 January 2005, SATA Gestão de Aeródromos (SATA Aerodrome Management) was established to operate the smaller airports on the islands of Pico, Graciosa, Corvo and São Jorge. The Regional Government of the Azores, after a public tender, provided SATA Aeródromos with the concession of public services for Corvo for a period of 10 years, in a contract signed on 1 July 2005.

In 2009, with the addition of new De Havilland Dash 8-Q200 to the SATA Air Açores fleet, to replace the existing Dornier 228, there was a comparable increase in passenger traffic to the island (primarily from the move to 37-seat from 18-seat capacity aircraft). Regardless, the airport accounted for a 1.3% increase in traffic in that year, on an island that only accounts for 3% of the passenger traffic handled by SATA Aeródrome. While there were decreases in the amount of cargo transported at other airports, the addition of new aircraft caused a 45% increase in cargo traffic from Corvo. This was also the year that the runway was repaved to accommodate the new aircraft at a cost of 190,000 euros.

On 3 August 2012, CDS-PP deputy Paulo Rosa denounced the lack of security in the Azores' smallest aerodrome, citing the recommended measures stipulated by the IATA after 11 September 2001. Rosa noted that, eleven years on, those rules had not been applied in many of the aerodromes of the Azores.

SATA, the airport's manager, launched a competition to remodel and expand the aerodrome on 13 August 2013, that includes improvements to security, passenger comfort and inter-island travel. Part of the regional Public Works Plans, the project finally divides the arrivals and departures area into two individual sections, establishes restricted zones and control accesses, and installs a metal detector and baggage inspection station.

== Geography ==
The Corvo aerodrome is located on the island of Corvo, one of the two volcanically stable islands that lie west of the Mid-Atlantic Ridge, in the archipelago of the Azores. But, located in the extreme north-western end of the group, it is exposed to the elements and susceptible to terrible weather throughout the year. Corvo is the last to be assisted by the Azores High, and first to lose this protection at the end of the season: it is plagued by storms and anticyclones throughout the year, making flying conditions difficult.

The airport is situated on the southern coast of the island, at least 50 m (160 ft) from the water's edge, flanking the southern limit of Vila do Corvo. The runway extends 800 m (2,625 ft) along the isthmus, from the western beach of Praia da Areia to the rocky outcroppings of Ponta Negra on the eastern shore. The airport is surrounded both by hedged fields and buildings, including the Porto da Casa (main port).

== Airlines and destinations ==
The following airlines operate regular scheduled and charter flights at Corvo Airport:

Airlines	Destinations
SATA Air Açores	Flores, Horta

== See also ==
- Aviation in the Azores
