= Corvus (disambiguation) =

Corvus is a genus of birds commonly known as crows and ravens.

Corvus may also refer to:

== Companies ==
- Corvus Energy, a Norwegian supplier originally founded in Canada
- Corvus Hungary, an aircraft manufacturer
- Corvus Systems, an American defunct computer hardware manufacturer

== Fictional characters ==
- Corvus, a main antagonist in movie Pompeii (film)
- Corvus, a character in Satyajit Ray's Professor Shonku series
- Corvus, a character in the video game Call of Duty: Black Ops III
- Corvus, a character in the video game Dragon Quest IX: Sentinels of the Starry Skies
- Corvus, a character in the video games Heretic and Heretic II
- Corvus Glaive, a Marvel comics character

== Military ==
- ASM-N-8 Corvus, a United States Navy missile
- Corvus (boarding device), used by ancient Roman warships
- Corvus chaff launcher, a British shipborne chaff decoy system manufactured by Vickers
- SS Corvus, the name of two steamships, both put out of service in 1945
- USS Corvus, a U.S. Navy attack cargo ship of World War II

== People ==
- Joannes Corvus (fl. 1512 – 1544), Flemish portrait painter
- Marcus Valerius Corvus (c. 370–270 BC), Roman military commander and politician
- Corvulus of Friuli, an 8th-century AD Lombardic duke (name is a Latin diminutive of Corvus)

== Publishing ==
- Corvus (imprint), an imprint of Atlantic Books
- Corvus: A Life with Birds, a 2008 non-fiction book by Esther Woolfson

== Other uses ==
- Corvus (constellation), a small constellation in the Southern Celestial Hemisphere
  - Corvus in Chinese astronomy, the same constellation as considered in traditional Chinese uranography
- Corvus (heraldry), crows and ravens in heraldry
- Corvus, a ship in the 2017 video game Star Wars Battlefront II
- Corvus Corax (band), a German band known for playing neo-Medieval music
- Gibson Corvus, a guitar product line
