= Corvo Island =

Smallest island of the Azores, Portugal

Native name: Ilha do Corvo
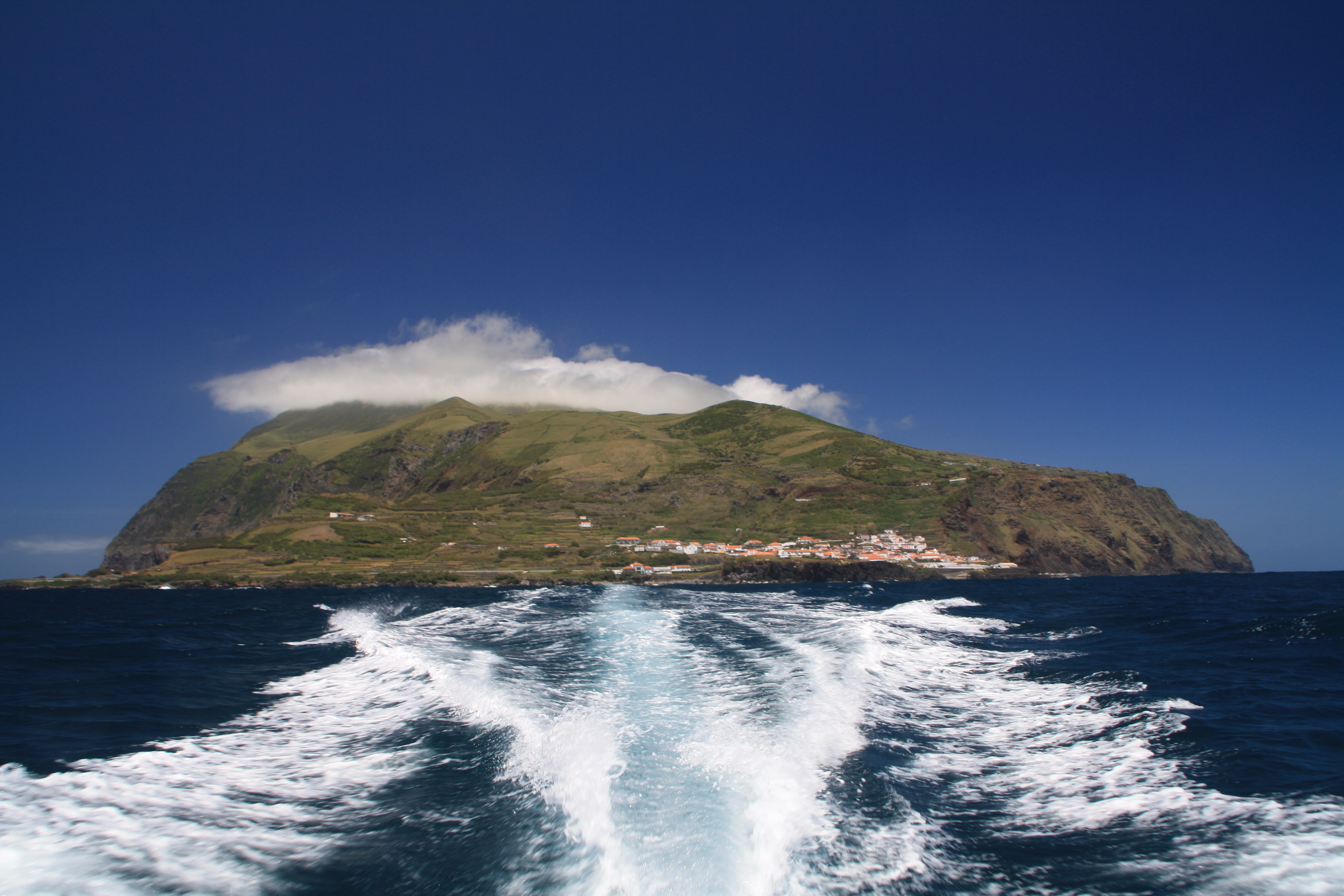
- The island of Corvo as seen from the Corvo-Flores Channel

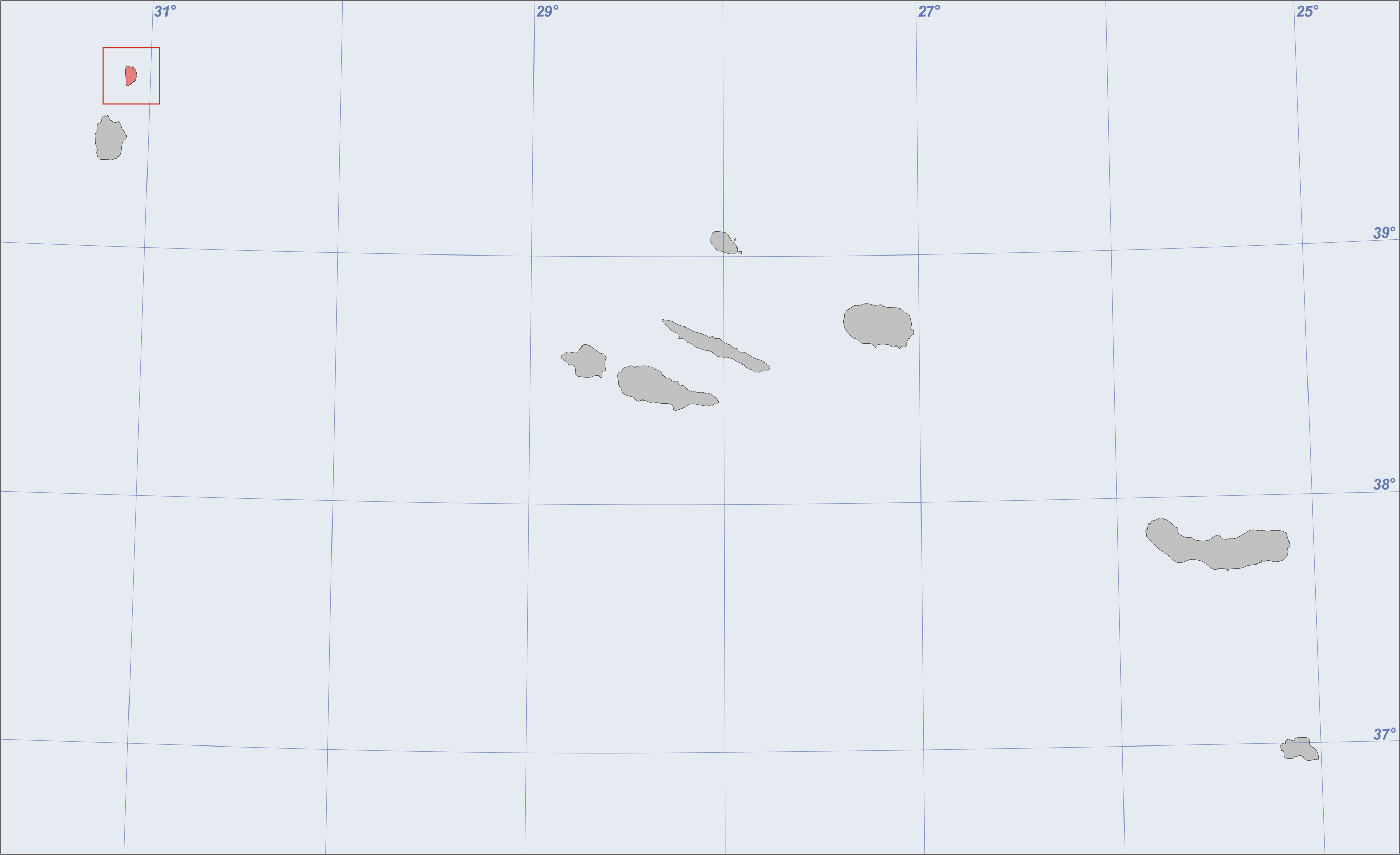
- Location in the Azores

Geography
- Location: Atlantic Ocean
- Coordinates: 39°41′51″N 31°06′19″W
- Area: 17.12 km^{2} (6.61 sq mi)
- Coastline: 21.49 km (13.353 mi)
- Highest elevation: 720 m (2360 ft)
- Highest point: Estreitinho

Administration
- Portugal
- Region: Azores

Demographics
- Demonym: Corvino; Corvense
- Population: ▲435 (2023)
- Languages: Portuguese
- Ethnic groups: Portuguese

Additional information
- Time zone: UTC−01:00

Corvo Island (Portuguese: Ilha do Corvo, pronounced [ˈiʎɐ ðu ˈkoɾvu], lit. 'Island of the Crow') is the smallest and the northernmost island of the Azores archipelago and the northernmost in Macaronesia. It has a population of 435 inhabitants (as of 2023) making it the smallest single municipality in the Azores and in Portugal. The island lies on the North American Plate.

== History ==
The documented history of the Azores originates with non-official exploration during the period of the late 13th century, resulting in maps, such as the Genovese Atlas Medici from 1351, which mentions obscure islands in an undefined Atlantic archipelago. The Medici Atlas refers to an Insula Corvi Marini (Island of the Marine Crow; "marine crow" is the literal translation of Corvo Marinho, which is the Portuguese name for the cormorant), in a seven-island archipelago, but it is improbable that it refers specifically to Corvo, although the island's name could have originated from this atlas. It is likely that the name referred to the two islands of Corvo and Flores, which also appeared on the later Aragonese Mapa Catalão of 1375.

The navigator Diogo de Teive discovered both islands of the Azores' Western Group on his 1452 return from the Banks of Newfoundland following his second voyage of exploration. The Portuguese royal chronicles state that when Teive arrived, he found a statue of a man on horseback, standing on a plinth bearing an inscription in an alphabet they did not understand. An attempt was subsequently made to remove the statue to Portugal, which led to its destruction. This account, alongside a hoard of coins which contemporary documents state were unearthed on the island in 1749, has led to speculation that the island was discovered by the Carthaginians c. 200 BC.

Subsequently, the Portuguese Court, when referring to the new Ilhas das Flores (Islands of Flowers), began to identify Corvo as Ilha de Santa Iria (Island of Saint Irene), but other nautical charts continued to refer to this island as Ilhéu das Flores (Islet of Flowers), Ilha da Estátua (Island of the Statue), Ilha do Farol (Island of the Lighthouse) or Ilha de São Tomás (Island of Saint Thomas). For a while it was also known as Ilha do Marco (Island of the Mark), which was attributed to its reference as a geographic marker for sailors, or, likely, the location of a small promontory where a marker was placed, which received the name Ponta do Marco.

Unsuccessful attempts at settlement of the island occurred in the following years; not until 1580 did a permanent settlement become viable.

A religious parish of Corvo was finally constituted in 1674, and then on 20 June 1832, integrated into a functioning civilian administration.

== Geology and geography ==
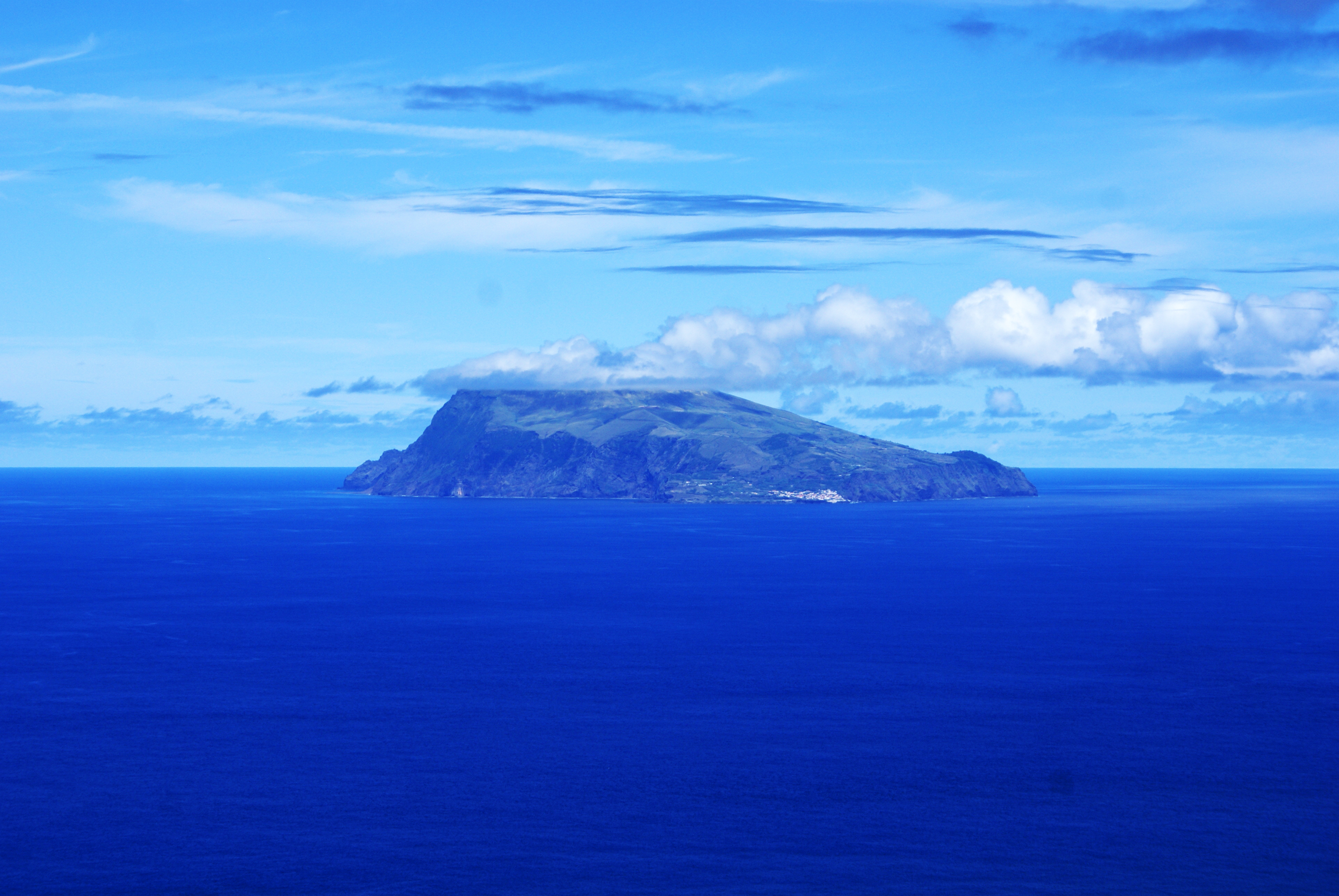
The perspective from the island of Flores

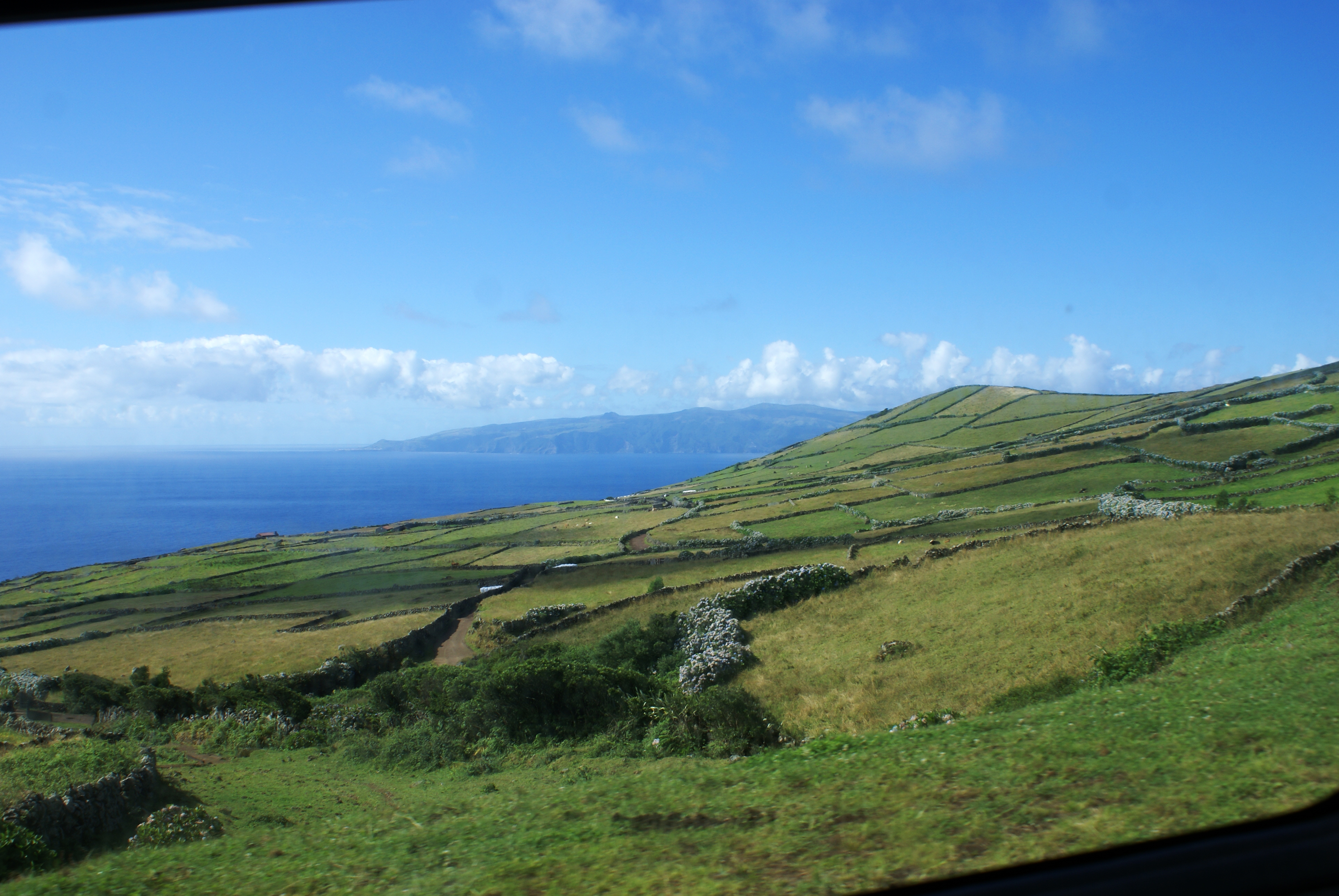
The view of the pasturelands of Zimbral

The island is located on the North American Plate, west of the Mid-Atlantic Ridge on a sea-mount of approximately 1.5-1.0 million years age. The islands of Corvo and Flores emerged from a submarine mount oriented along a north-northeast to south-southwest line, while Corvo is controlled by faults oriented north to south, parallel to the mid-Atlantic Ridge, and transform faults oriented west to east which crosscut secondary cones on the outer slopes. The island formed from a 5 km diameter central volcano (Monte Gorde) that emerged around 730,000 years ago, whose central cone was approximately 1,000 m (3,300 ft) in altitude. The crater collapsed 430,000 years ago during a Plinian eruption, forming a subsidence caldera (2,000 m (7,000 ft) in diameter and 300 m (1,000 ft) depth), referred to as the Caldeirão. Within the caldera are several cinder and spatter cones (20–30 m (65–100 ft) in height) giving rise to small lakes, peat bogs, and islets (two long and five rounded). The highest point on the island, the Morro dos Homens, crowns the southern rim of the Caldeirão at 718 m (2,356 ft) above sea level.

Two main volcanic complexes are usually recognized:

- The Basal Complex – the oldest formative structures, that includes pyroclastic submarine tuff cones, around the southwest and northern sea cliffs. In some areas, specifically along the western, northern and north-east, the island is cut by faults extending from the Upper Complexes;
- The Upper Complex (Complex Superior 1 and 2) – divided into two volcanic units of pre- and post-caldera episodes; the Complex 1 (or pre-caldera) is represented by sub-aerial volcanism, characterized by both explosive and effusive volcanism. This phase is characterized by a succession of basaltic lavas in the base, and developing into mixture of basaltic and Hawaiian lavas in later phases. The secondary (Complex 2) formations occupy 90% of the island, and pertain to the central caldera, including pumice and explosive particulars that are a mixture of escoria lava of a basaltic and Hawaiian in nature. The most recent of the deposits correspond to pyroclastic and phreatomagmatic pyroclastic material associated with secondary cones.

While the initial phases were dominated by basaltic lava flows and pyroclastic deposits, the final phase was characterized by pumice, surges, lahars, and pyroclastic flows characteristic of Plinian and sub-Plinian eruptions.

Sheer cliffs dominate the coastal areas, the exception being along the southern margin which is composed of ancient lava flows. The western cliffs, with an almost vertical slope rises 700 m (2,300 ft) above sea level; one of the major coastal elevations in the Atlantic. Remnants of the ancient volcano are partially preserved in the southern and eastern flanks of the island (which retain altitudes between 500 and 700 m (1,600 and 2,300 ft) above sea level). In addition to marine erosion, the island is constantly eroded by strong northeast and western winds. In the south, secondary cinder cones, such as Coroinha, Morro da Fonte, Grotão da Castelhana and Coroa do Pico, are visibly preserved with little erosion, and responsible for many basaltic flows that formed the southern lava fajã (10–60 m (30–200 ft) above sea level). The last eruption took place about 80–100,000 years ago in the vicinity of Vila Nova do Corvo.

In the extreme northeast, along the Ponta Torrais there are two small islets, Ilhéu dos Torrais and the Ilhéu do Torrão, in addition to several submarine reefs, that are dangerous to navigation. At the end of October 2012, following several days of excess rainfall, a landslide occurred that dislodged geological debris along the northwestern corner of the island, resulting in the formation of small islets, that progressively transformed into a peninsula and, finally a fajã.

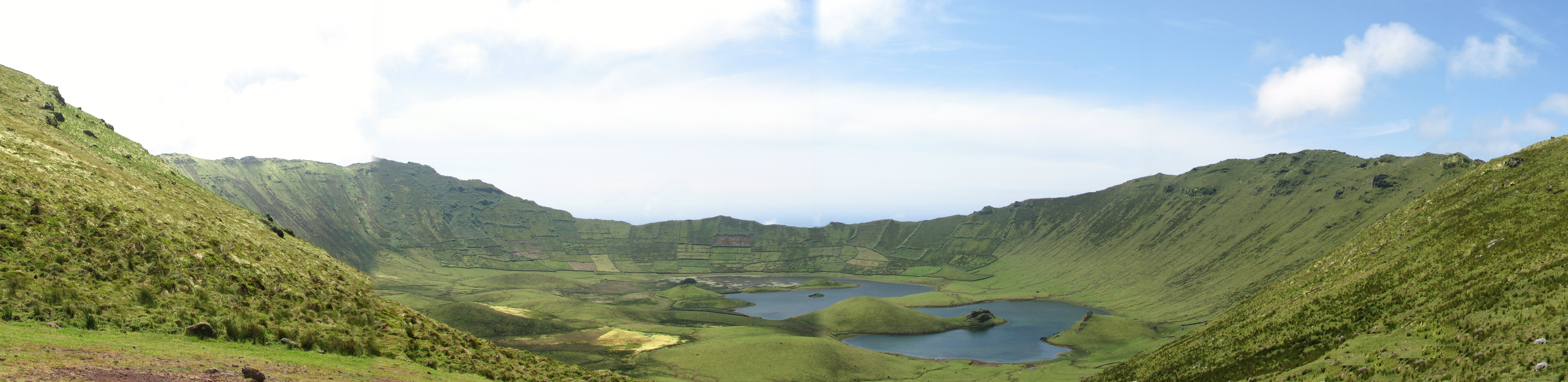
A panorama of the Caldeirão, the remnants of the last Plinian eruption on the island of Corvo, as seen from the crater rim around Malaguetas

== Environment ==
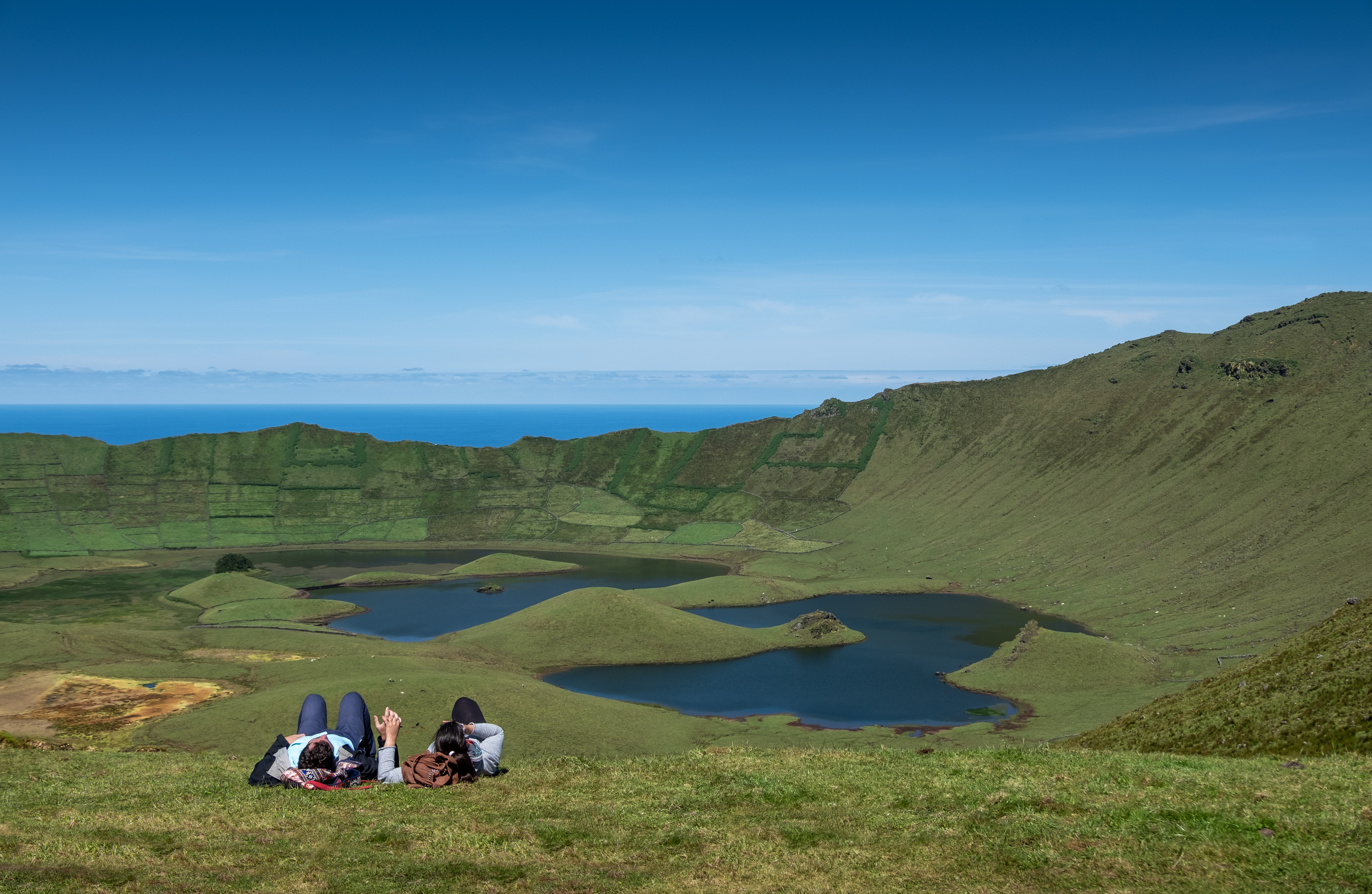
Corvo's caldeira, a protected area

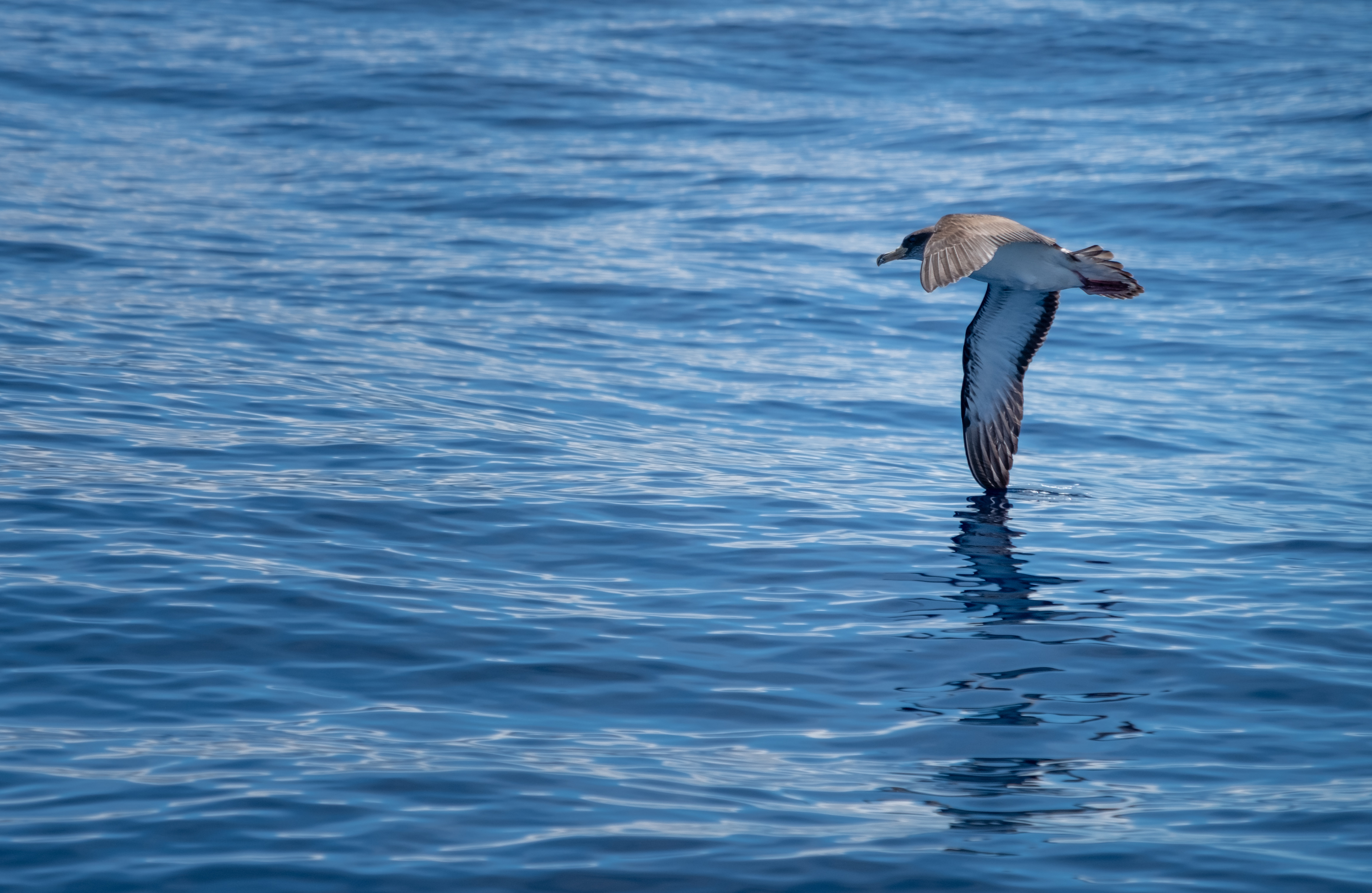
Cory's shearwater looking for fish near the island

=== Ecoregions/Protected areas ===
The Corvo Nature Park was created under Regional Legislative Decree 44/2008/A, on 5 November 2008, in order to conserve and protect species habitat and natural resources on the island. It includes principally two categories, and associated areas of intervention:

Protected Areas for the Management of Habitats and Coastal Species

- [COR01] Protected Area of the Caldera of Corvo (Portuguese: Área Protegida para a Gestão de Habitats ou Espécies da Costa e Caldeirão do Corvo)

Protected Areas for the Management of Resources

- [COR02] Protected Resource Area of the Coast of Corvo (Portuguese: Área Protegida para a Gestão de Recursos da Costa do Corvo)

=== Important Bird Area ===
The islands of Corvo and neighbouring Flores, along with the surrounding waters, form the 210,400 ha Corvo and Flores Important Bird Area (IBA), designated as such by BirdLife International because it provides feeding and breeding sites for populations of Cory's, little and Manx shearwaters, as well as roseate and common terns, and, possibly, Madeiran storm petrels.

== Climate ==
According to Köppen, Corvo has a humid subtropical climate. As is the case with other western Azorean islands, the climate is very humid and mild to warm year-round due the effects of the Gulf Stream, with around 1,100 mm (43.3 in) of precipitation annually near the coast and reaching 2,400 mm (94.5 in) at the highest altitudes, comfortable although generally windy. Average temperatures are around 17.5 °C (64 °F) in Vila do Corvo, varying between 14 °C (57 °F) in the winter to 22 °C (72 °F) in the summer. Fog is common and almost permanent at higher elevations (and is referred to as the Fogs of São João). Due to maritime agitation, particularly on the western coast, there is elevated abrasion along the coast. Relative humidity is around 80% year-round.

Climate data for Corvo Airport, 1961-1981, altitude: 18 m (59 ft)
Month	Jan	Feb	Mar	Apr	May	Jun	Jul	Aug	Sep	Oct	Nov	Dec	Year
Record high °C (°F)	19.9 (67.8)	19.5 (67.1)	20.3 (68.5)	21.0 (69.8)	23.8 (74.8)	25.9 (78.6)	28.2 (82.8)	28.9 (84.0)	28.4 (83.1)	26.5 (79.7)	22.6 (72.7)	21.8 (71.2)	28.9 (84.0)
Mean daily maximum °C (°F)	16.2 (61.2)	15.8 (60.4)	16.3 (61.3)	17.2 (63.0)	18.8 (65.8)	21.0 (69.8)	23.8 (74.8)	25.2 (77.4)	23.9 (75.0)	21.2 (70.2)	18.7 (65.7)	17.2 (63.0)	19.6 (67.3)
Daily mean °C (°F)	14.2 (57.6)	13.8 (56.8)	14.2 (57.6)	15.1 (59.2)	16.6 (61.9)	18.8 (65.8)	21.4 (70.5)	22.6 (72.7)	21.5 (70.7)	19.0 (66.2)	17.0 (62.6)	15.4 (59.7)	17.5 (63.4)
Mean daily minimum °C (°F)	12.3 (54.1)	11.7 (53.1)	12.2 (54.0)	13.0 (55.4)	14.4 (57.9)	16.6 (61.9)	18.9 (66.0)	20.1 (68.2)	19.1 (66.4)	16.9 (62.4)	15.2 (59.4)	13.6 (56.5)	15.3 (59.6)
Record low °C (°F)	5.3 (41.5)	4.5 (40.1)	5.7 (42.3)	7.5 (45.5)	9.0 (48.2)	11.4 (52.5)	14.7 (58.5)	12.5 (54.5)	13.0 (55.4)	10.5 (50.9)	8.0 (46.4)	4.5 (40.1)	4.5 (40.1)
Average rainfall mm (inches)	144.0 (5.67)	119.9 (4.72)	99.7 (3.93)	76.5 (3.01)	62.5 (2.46)	49.9 (1.96)	55.9 (2.20)	67.4 (2.65)	96.6 (3.80)	110.2 (4.34)	131.6 (5.18)	130.4 (5.13)	1,144.6 (45.05)
Average relative humidity (%)	80	81	82	82	81	82	80	79	80	80	82	81	81
Mean monthly sunshine hours	78.6	86.0	112.5	137.3	168.4	161.6	217.3	231.1	168.2	124.0	88.7	66.9	1,640.6
Percentage possible sunshine	26	29	31	35	38	36	48	55	45	36	30	23	36
Source: Instituto de Meteorologia

== Human settlement ==
There is one urban centre on the island: Vila do Corvo. Principally, it is a collection of many residential homes, interspersed with commercial businesses located on the southern one-third of the island. Functionally, by law, Vila do Corvo is the only Portuguese top-level municipality without a civil parish. The urbanized area is divided between the village, the airport, and the island's ports (being the primary links to the other islands in the archipelago). The lands immediately around the settlement are small zones along the eastern coast (Quintas and Fojo) that can sustain cultivation of some crops and fruit trees, and where some older trees have survived settlement; the best pasture-lands are located in the north in the zone of Terras Altas.

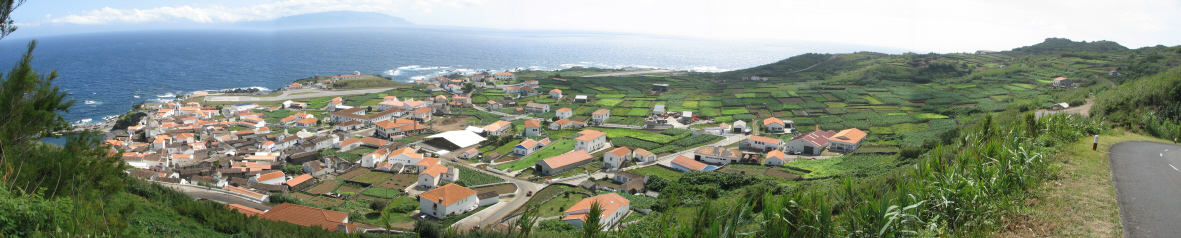
Vila do Corvo, the only settlement on the island, as seen from Portal, looking towards Flores Island.

The southern coast, referred to as Enseada de Nossa Senhora do Rosário, is the location of three ports, constructed at various times for diverse needs: Porto Novo (currently not utilized), the Porto do Boqueirão and Porto da Casa (the largest and the island's commercial port). Portinho da Areia, on the extreme west of the southern coast (at the end of the airport's runway) is the only beach and principal swimming area on the island.

=== Economy ===
Subsistence agriculture has predominated on the island since it was first settled. It currently occupies 17.5% of the area of the municipality, and concentrated on small parcels in the eastern half of the island and along the northern parts of Vila do Corvo. In this patchwork of volcanic hedge-rows, farmers concentrate on semi-permanent crops (potatoes, some cereals, including wheat and citrus orchards).

Dairy production is the primary activity, and cheese is one of the primary commercialized products, although the raising of pigs and poultry is also common. Until the 1960s, the raising of sheep and the commercialization of wool was also important on the island. This was until a change in forestry policy forced many farmers to vacate uncultivated lands, lands that were routinely used to graze sheep. It was quickly the end of the wool industry on the island, an industry that had been integral to the island's small export industry.

=== Transport ===
The island is served by the Corvo Airport (IATA: CVU, ICAO: LPCR), located on the southern margin of the island between the village and southern ocean ports. Inter-island flights are handled by SATA Air Açores: there are no direct flights to Corvo from outside the archipelago. Since the 1990s, the airport has been serviced by one Bombardier Dash 8 Q200 aircraft, big enough to handle the low volume of traffic to the island (weather permitting). These flights have since been operated by alternating DeHavilland Dash 8 aircraft, as part of the fleet revitalization program of the late 20th century.

== See also ==
- List of volcanoes in Azores
