= Ponta Delgada, Santa Cruz das Flores =

Ponta Delgada
- Civil parish
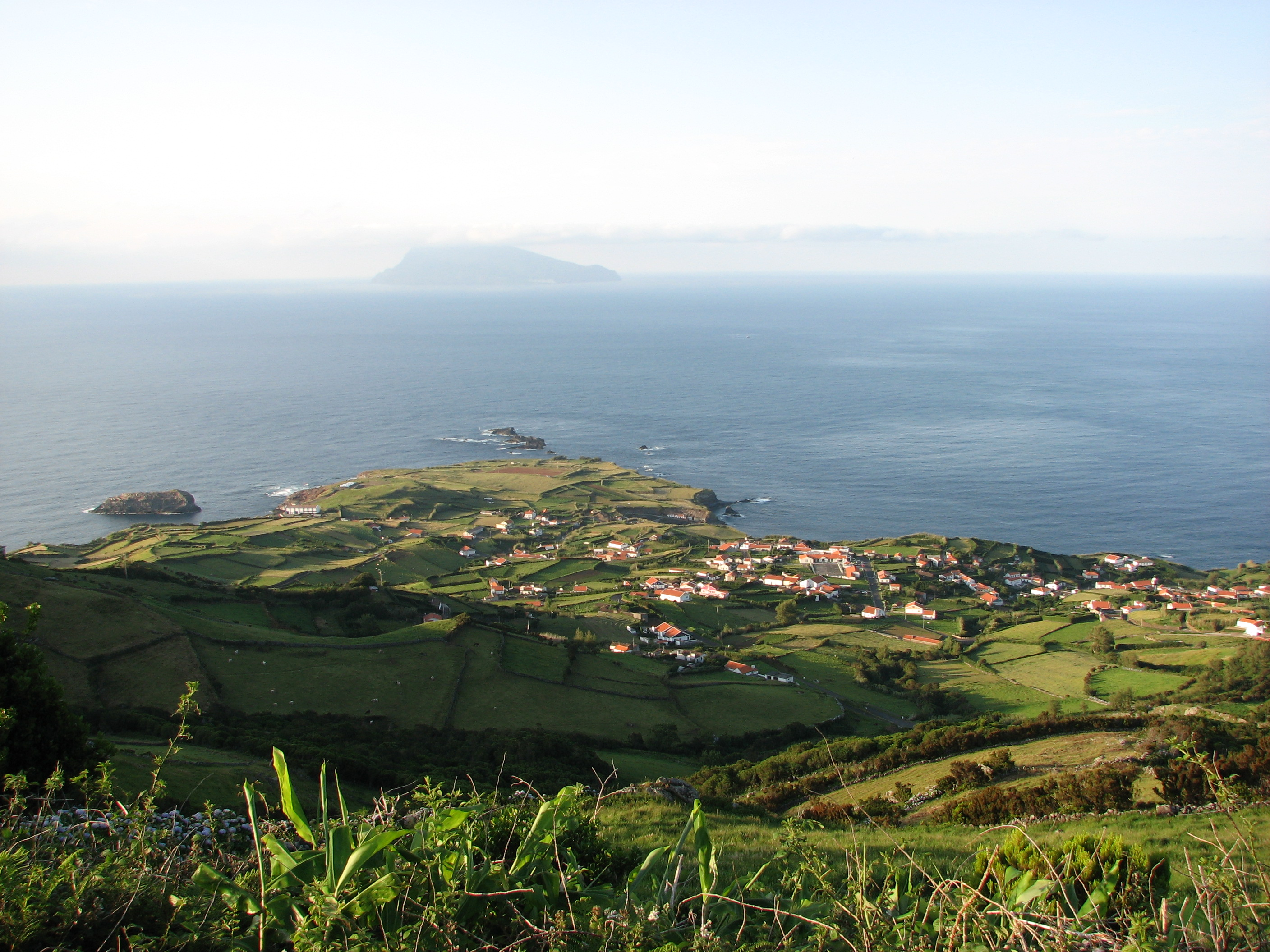
- View of Ponta Delgada das Flores, with the distant island of Corvo

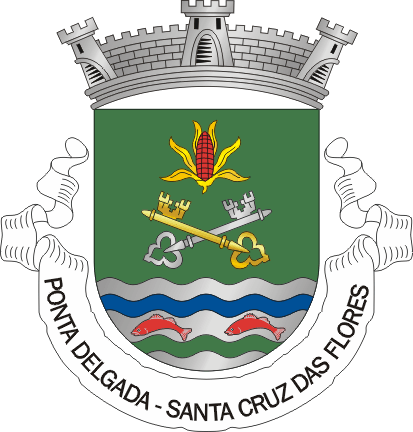
- Coat of arms

- Location in the Azores Ponta Delgada (Flores Island (Azores))
- Coordinates: 39°30′54.20″N 31°12′32.41″W
- Country: Portugal
- Auton. region: Azores
- Island: Flores
- Municipality: Santa Cruz das Flores
- Established: Settlement and parish: c.1571 Civil parish: 28 November 1684

Area
  - Total: 17.65 km^{2} (6.81 sq mi)
- Elevation: 78 m (256 ft)

Population (2021)
  - Total: 280
  - Density: 16/km^{2} (41/sq mi)
- Time zone: UTC−01:00 (AZOT)
  - Summer (DST): UTC+00:00 (AZOST)
- Postal code: 9970-064
- Area code: 292
- Patron: São Pedro
- Website: cmscflores.pt

Ponta Delgada is a rural civil parish in the Azorean municipality of Santa Cruz das Flores, on the Portuguese island of Flores. The population in 2021 was 280, in an area of 17.65 km^{2}. It is situated along the northern coast from the regional capital. It is the third oldest religious parish on the island of Flores, only preceded by the communities of Lajes and Santa Cruz das Flores.

== History ==
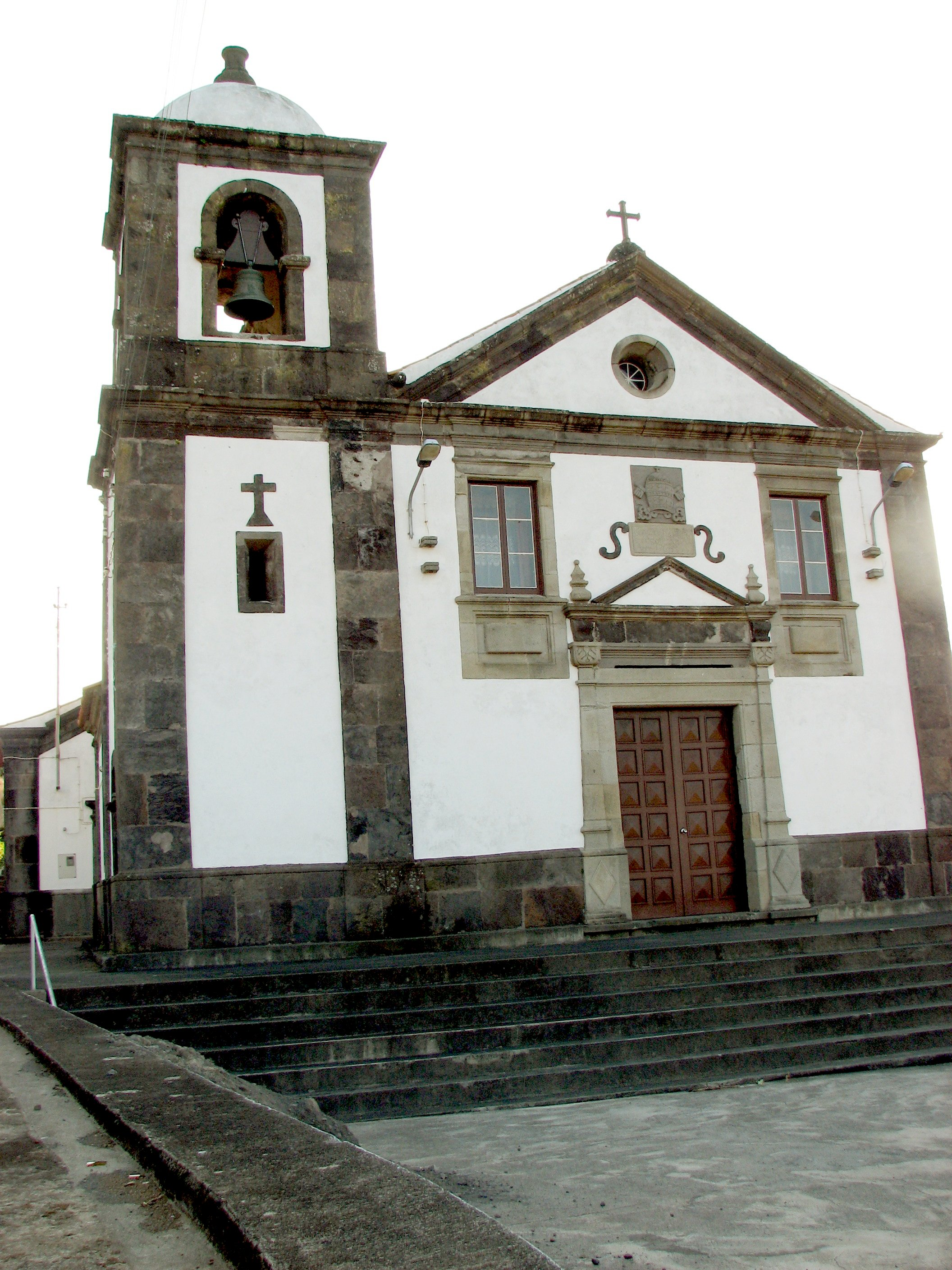
Parochial Church of São Pedro, rebuilt from funds donated by Father Francisco de Fraga e Almeida

The religious parish of São Pedro da Ponta Delgada was one of the first three religious parishes on the island of Flores. The historical chronicler, Father Gaspar Frutuoso, stated that, at the end of the 16th century, Ponta Delgada was a small population of thirty neighbors and one chapel. A century later, Friar Agostinho de Montalverne referred to 650 inhabitants occupying 140 homes: essentially claiming it was the largest population on the island.

Diogo das Chagas first placed the colonization of this area at about 1571, attaining the position of parish immediately. It included the area from Ribeira Funda until Ribeira das Casas, as well as Ponta Ruiva (now in Cedros and Ponta da Fajã (now part of Fajã Grande in the neighbouring municipality). Father António Cordeiro referred to a community of 150 homes and several roads leading to the ocean. The fertility of the land and access to potable water greatly assisted this growth.

As Frutuoso noted, a primitive parish chapel was erected to the invocation of Santa Ana, but had long since "disappeared". The church of São Pedro was erected in 1763 near a small chapel, with the same name, at the end of the 17th century. In addition to São Pedro, the chapel of Santo Amaro (which co-existed in the parish, since the end of the 17th century) was the centre of popular festivals and testified to the community's dynamic nature: São Pedro, the protector of fishermen and Santo Amaro, protector of animals. The chapel of Santo Amaro was located near the old centre of the village near a grotto and spring. But, over time, the inhabitants decided to move the town centre away from the exposure to local northern wind currents. The principal promoter of a project to re-build the Church of São Pedro was Father Francisco de Fraga e Almeida, a man of immense wealth and former-Vicar of Flores and Corvo Islands. His final testament bequeathed 100,000 réis to the Confraria de São Pedro (English: Confraternity of Saint Peter) to celebrate a mass in his name on the day of the inauguration of the new temple. It is not clear when that finally occurred, but documents show that in 1774 the builders were still working on the altars of the Church. This church was restored twice more (in 1971 and 1975), both times maintaining the interior and original foundations.

On August 13, 1978 a new chapel was consecrated to the invocation of São João Baptista on Pico do Meio Dia near the site of a concrete cross that was consecrated on September 27, 1970. This new chapel gave rise to annual festivals celebrated every September.

== Geography ==
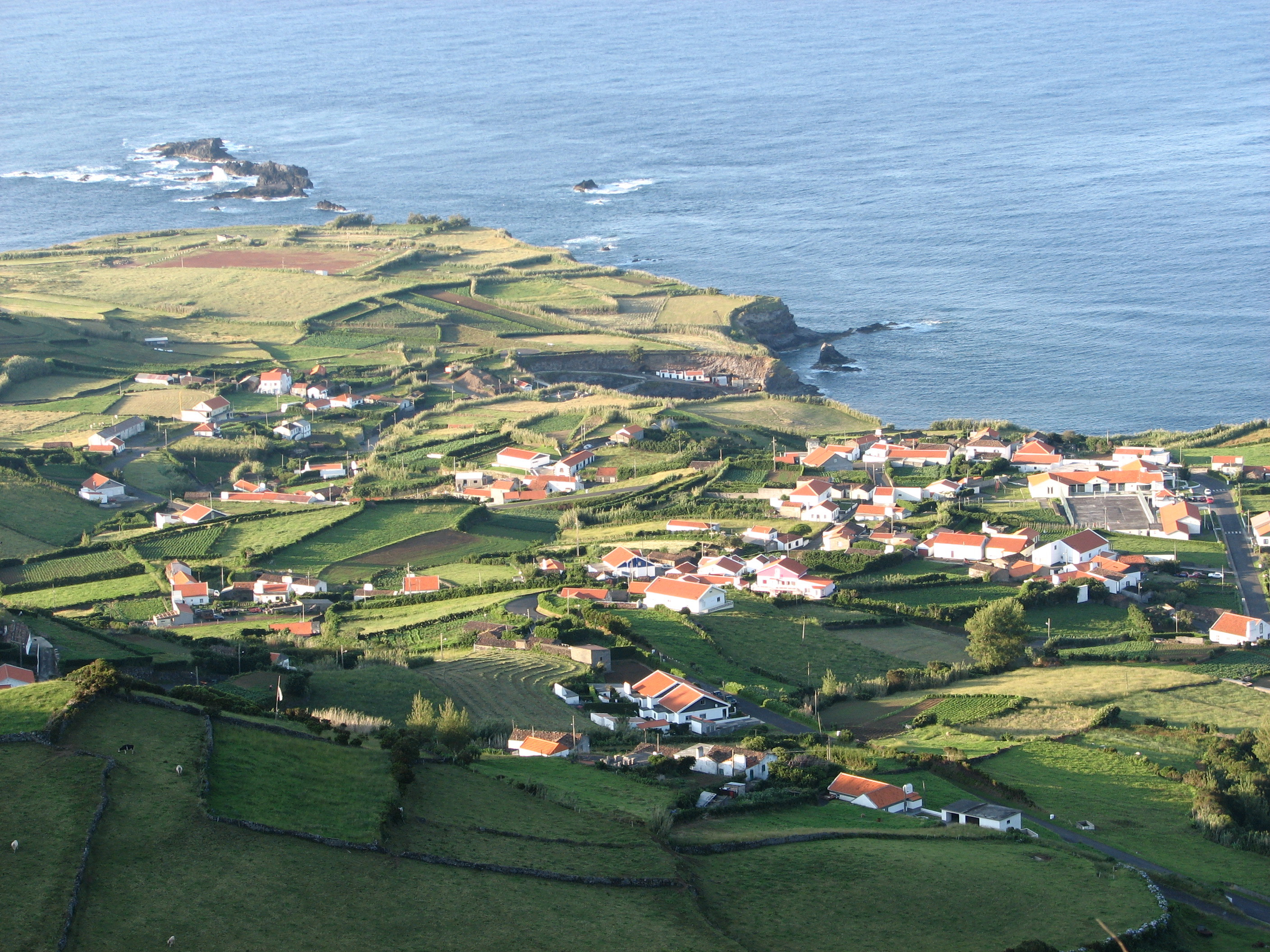
Panorama of Ponta Delgada das Flores, as seen from Pico do Meio Dia

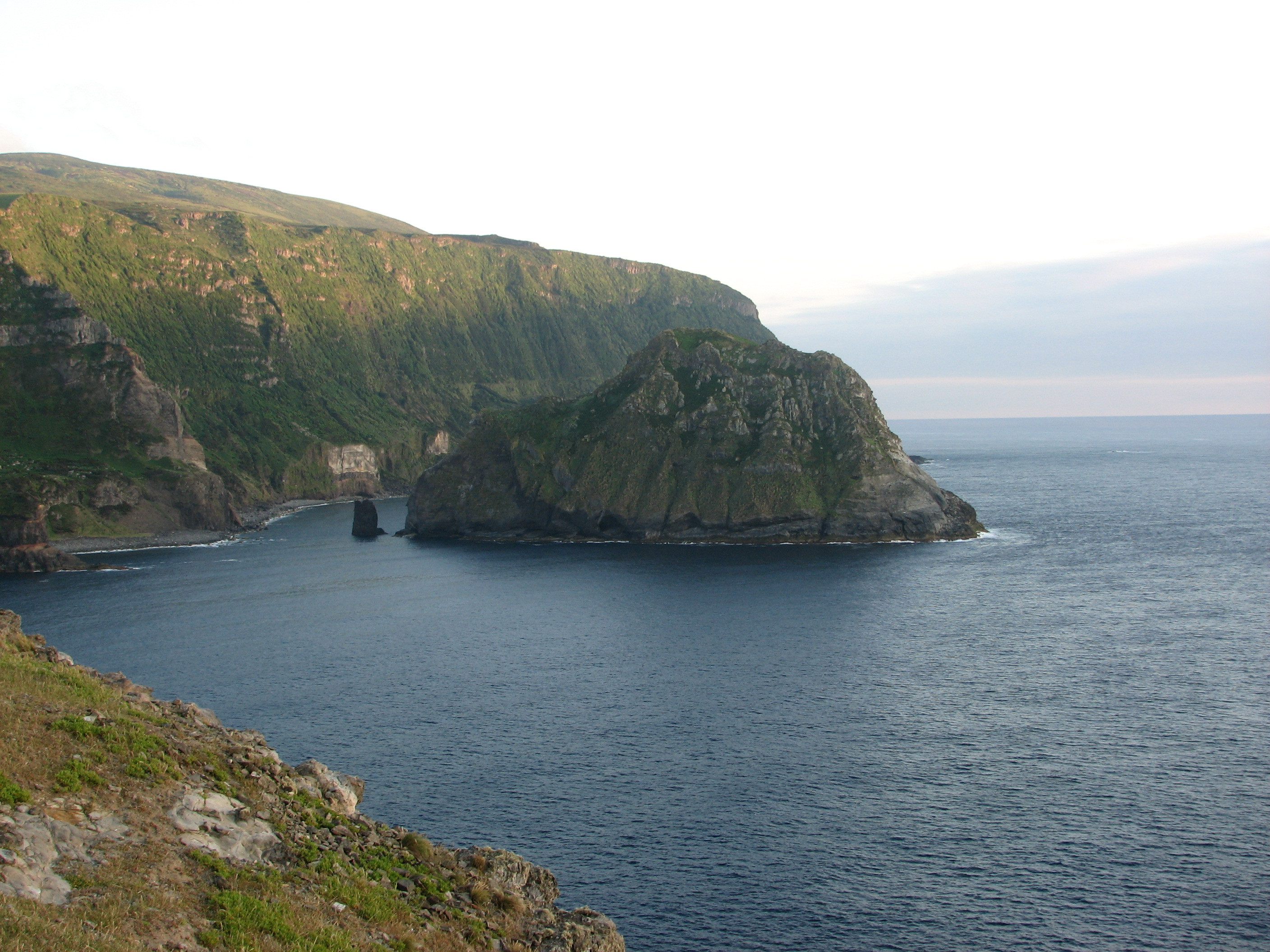
The Maria Vaz Islet, as seen from the area around Albernaz Point Lighthouse

The community is located on the northern coast of Flores Island, on a flat rock-bed that extends into the Atlantic Ocean, across from the island of Corvo (Flores' nearest neighbour). On either coast of the village are two islets, Maria Vaz (on the west coast) and João Martins, both named after important settlers during early colonization. Writing at the beginning of the 19th century, Father José António Camões described the villages place, as follows:

...passing the Furnal point you travel northeast to the port of Ponta Delgada. There is there, at the foot of the ocean, a sweet water spring that serves a great many of the inhabitants of that parish. There is a port...without fortifications...but with a cliff that is protective. Continuing north-east begins the great bay of Ponta Delgada, falling to this ocean is the Ribeira da Fazenda...and within the parish a port, called Portinho, where only with good humour can you unload your boats. There is a guard house. Outside the small port are two islets, called the islets of Portinho...continuing along the same wind trajectory there is a point called Ponta do Ilhéu.

The area today is connected to Santa Cruz das Flores by a coastal road system that also crosses the interior of the island. The first automobile reached the parish in 1966: one of the last places on the island to be reached by road vehicles. Until then, transit to the north was made by horse-drawn carriage, by horse or mule, foot or by boat access from the south (when the weather permitted).

As a consequence of modern emigration to the United States and Canada, and recently to the larger centre in Santa Cruz das Flores, the population has been in steady decline; in 1814 forty births were registered in the parish, but by the 1980s between two and six births were recorded.

=== Climate ===
Climate data for Ponta Delgada, 1977-1995, altitude 58 m (190 ft)
| Month | Jan | Feb | Mar | Apr | May | Jun | Jul | Aug | Sep | Oct | Nov | Dec | Year |
|---|---|---|---|---|---|---|---|---|---|---|---|---|---|
| Average precipitation mm (inches) | 196.4 (7.73) | 180.6 (7.11) | 133.7 (5.26) | 109.5 (4.31) | 107.9 (4.25) | 73.6 (2.90) | 51.8 (2.04) | 67.4 (2.65) | 127.3 (5.01) | 157.2 (6.19) | 208.1 (8.19) | 216.8 (8.54) | 1,630.3 (64.18) |
Source: Portuguese Environmental Agency

=== Ecoregions/Protected areas ===
There are a few lookouts that provide tourists with notable vistas of Ponta Delgada, including Miradouro do Pico do Meio-Dia, Miradouro do Alto do Portalinho and Miradouro do Porto and Miradouro do Facho. In addition Ponta Delgada is bisected by approximately seven pedestrian hiking trails, within the community and with other parishes.

=== Natural Features ===
- Ponta do Albernaz, natural rock cliffs located in the western portion of Ponta Delgada, location of the lighthouse
- Ilhéu da Maria Vaz, named for one of the original settlers of Flores, a small pyramidal islet in the bay of Ponta Delgada along its western coast.
- Ilhéus do João Martins, named for another settler, and located off the northern coast of Ponta Delgada.
- Pico do Meio Dia, location of the Chapel of São João Baptista, overlooking the southern part of Ponta Delgada
- Quebrada Nova dos Fenais, a fajã along the southwest limits of parish accessible by pedestrian trail.
- Ponta dos Ilhéus, an isthmus cliff on the southeast limit of the parish site of several mills constructed during settlement, now mostly in ruins.

== Economy ==
The parish's principal activities are farming and animal husbandry (dairy and cattle ranching primarily), focusing on dairy production, as well as subsistence fishing and a small commercial nucleus. The port has had remodeling and modernization to permit both an increase in commercial traffic between Ponta Delgada, Vila do Corvo (Corvo Island) and the rest of the archipelago, as well as to capture lucrative trans-Atlantic maritime tourism.

== Architecture ==
=== Civic ===
- Lighthouse of Ponta do Albernaz (Portuguese: Farol da Ponta do Albernaz), inaugurated on 28 January 1925 as part of the Plano Geral de Alumiamento e Balizagem (General Illumination and Nautical Signalling Plan) for the northern coast of Flores, with the intent of providing a beacon for shipping passing through the Flores-Corvo;

=== Military ===
- French Satellite Tracking Station of Flores (Portuguese: Estação de Telemedidas das Flores), referred to locally as the French Base of Flores; a ballistic missile tracking station established in 1964, and operational until 1994, when its duties were co-opted by the French tracking ship Monje.

=== Religious ===
- Church of São Pedro (Portuguese: Igreja Paroquial de Ponta Delgada/Igreja de São Pedro), parochial church dedicated to St. Peter, constructed in 1763 and remodeled during the latter part of the 20th century;
- Casa do Espírito Santo de Terra Chã, religious buildings used in annual celebrations for the Divine Holy Spirit, erected in 1819
- Casa do Espírito Santo de Baixo, religious buildings used in annual celebrations for the Divine Holy Spirit, erected in 1847
- Casa do Espírito Santo da Cruz, religious buildings used in annual celebrations for the Divine Holy Spirit, erected in 1865
- Casa do Espírito Santo das Crianças, religious buildings used in annual celebrations for the Divine Holy Spirit, erected in 1926

== Culture ==
The community is the centre of northern activities, and supports several cultural, social and sporting groups. In particular: it is the location of the regions Casa do Povo (literally the house of the people) and its ethnographic folklore group the Grupo Folclórico da Casa do Povo, a modern festival hall, the residence of the Grupo de Música Popular Vozes do Norte, and their football club Clube Desportivo de Ponta Delgada.

=== Festivities ===
The parish's principal festival is the Festa de São Pedro (Festival of Saint Peter) celebrated annually on June 29, as well as the Festa do Santo Amaro (Festival of Saint Maurus), on the first Sunday of September. In addition, the Festa do São João (Festival of Saint John) on the second Sunday of July and the festival Nossa Senhora da Guia (Our Lady of the Guide) are also important religious events. Ultimately, the celebrations associated with the Holy Spirit, centered around the Sunday of Pentecost are the highlight of the religious calendar.
