= Convent of São Boaventura =

- Convento do São Boaventura
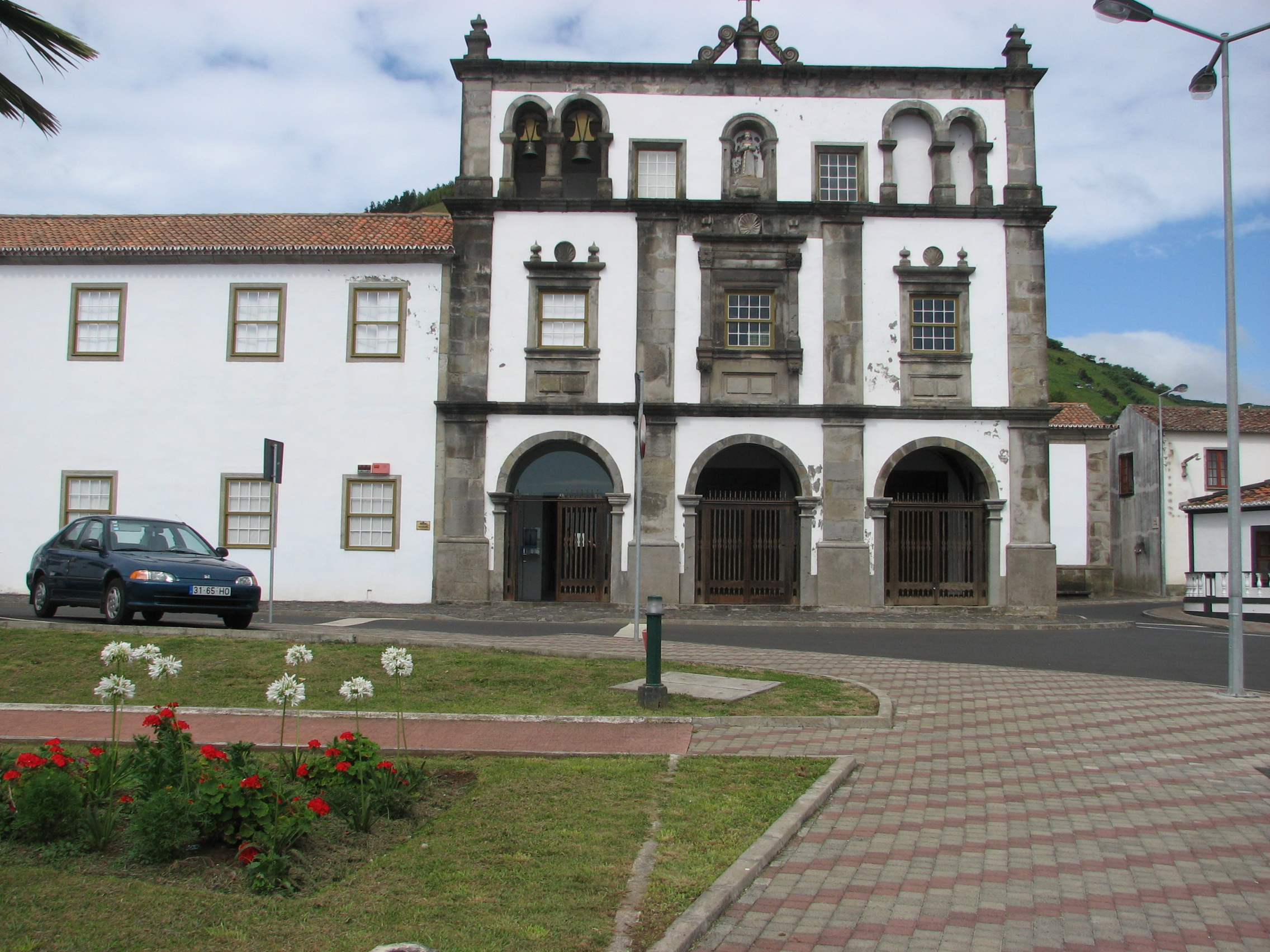
- The front facade of the Convent of Bonaventure and Church of St. Francis of Assisi, today the Scared Art Museum of Flores

- Location of the convent in the municipality of Santa Cruz das Flores

General information
- Type: Convent
- Architectural style: Baroque
- Location: Santa Cruz, Santa Cruz das Flores, Portugal
- Coordinates: 39°27′9.49″N 31°7′38.92″W
- Owner: Portuguese Republic

The Convent of São Boaventura (Portuguese: Convento de São Boaventura), Convent of Saint Bonaventure, popularly referred to it as the Church of São Francisco (Church of Saint Francis of Assisi), is located in the civil parish of Santa Cruz, in the municipality of the same name in the Portuguese archipelago of the Azores.

== History ==
This building, to the invocation of Saint Bonaventure, a Franciscan convent was built under the initiative of Inácio Coelho, then vicar of Santa Cruz through funds he made available on 26 June 1641. Legend suggests that the church and convent were erected in order to fulfill a vow following the triumph of Portuguese forces over Spain during the Restoration War.

During this period, friar Diogo das Chagas referred to the convent:

There is more to this new...village a convent of Franciscan friars who in August 1651 ordered constructed by the Very Reverend provincial Father Friar Mateus da Conceição, at the request of the said Reverend Father Vicar Inácio Coelho that he wanted to be patron, endowing him with a deed in Perpetuum in five moios of wheat annually, and a barrel of fine wine for the masses and quarter wheat, in addition to two rams in trade, in perpetuity following his funeral, and for the convent, he endowed nine acres of land with houses, which are today where the dormitories and church are located, where the first Mass and name was assigned to Saint Bonaventure...; etc...etc... At the end of the 17th century the convent was inhabited by seven curia and other attendants.

With the extinction of the religious orders on 17 May 1832, the church was transferred to the Third Order, and the convent acquired by a private landowner in 1834. This building remained in private hands until it was acquired António Vicente Peixoto Pimental who donated it to the Santa Casa da Misericórdia of Santa Cruz, who installed in the building their hospital and asylum.

The building was classified as a Property of Public Interest by the IPPAR, under resolution 98/80, 16 September 1980. Beginning in the 20th century, the spaces were remodelled with the arrival of French who occupied part of the former-convent. In the late 20th century the Museum of Flores was installed in the building, in the former convent and cloister, while the ancillary structures were used by the French forces, until the local health center was established. Under resolution 18/2011/A, by act of the Regional Legislative Assembly of the Azores, several projects were established, that included: a future intervention and general renovation of the convent's paints, to be consulted by the property-owners, local parish administration and municipality of Santa Cruz; and the protection of the building owing to salt. Public works at the convent, included repairs to the corners, frames and roof; during the course of the repairs it was determined that the level of degradation, suggesting an urgent preservation of the building. Following this restoration the building was trimmed in yellow ochre paint, resulting in a local polemic, owing to the change in the buildings appearance.
