= Cedros (Santa Cruz das Flores) =

- Civil parish
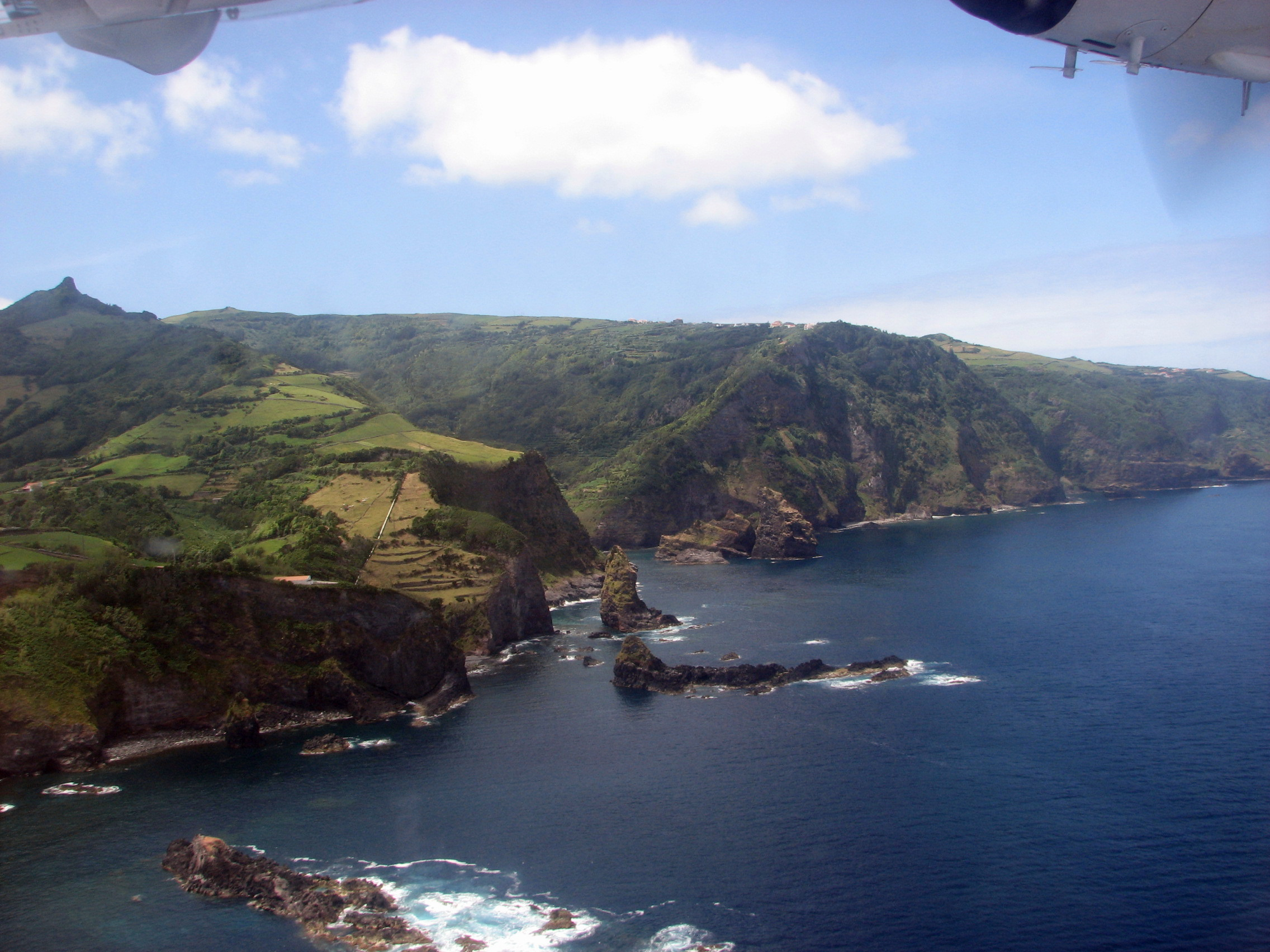
- Alagoa Bay and islets seen from the air (the village over the cliff at the center is Cedros; to the far right is Ponta Ruiva)

- Location in the Azores Cedros (Flores Island (Azores))
- Coordinates: 39°28′50″N 31°9′12″W
- Country: Portugal
- Auton. region: Azores
- Island: Flores
- Municipality: Santa Cruz das Flores
- Established: Parish: 29 July 1693

Area
  - Total: 10.30 km^{2} (3.98 sq mi)
- Elevation: 299 m (981 ft)

Population (2021)
  - Total: 112
  - Density: 10.9/km^{2} (28.2/sq mi)
- Time zone: UTC−01:00 (AZOT)
  - Summer (DST): UTC+00:00 (AZOST)
- Postal code: 9970-031
- Area code: 292
- Patron: Nossa Senhora do Pilar
- Website: cmscflores.pt

Cedros is a Portuguese civil parish in the municipality of Santa Cruz das Flores, on the island of Flores in the Azores. The population in 2021 was 112, in an area of approximately 10.30 square kilometres (3.98 mi^{2}).

== History ==
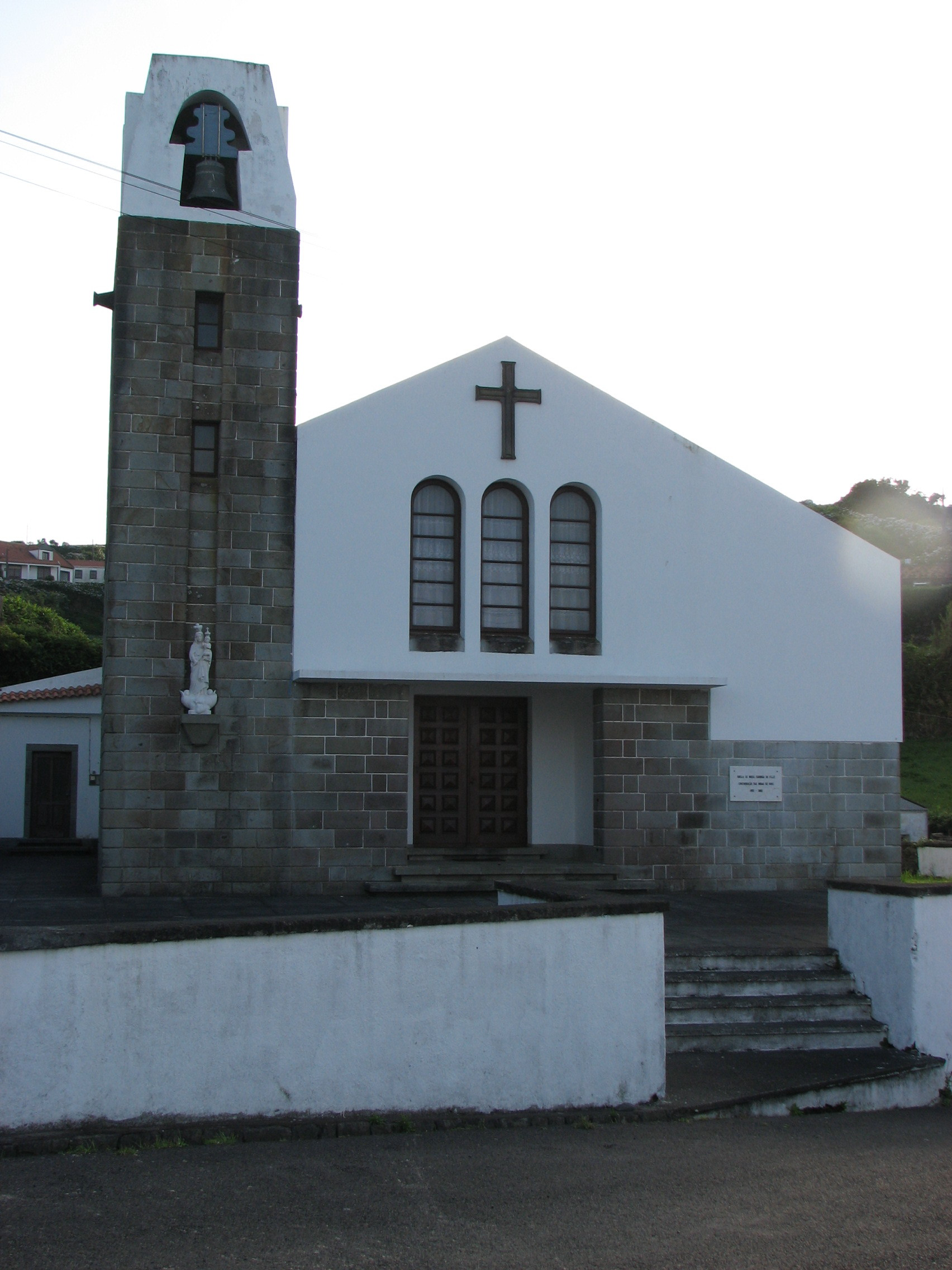
Parochial Church of Nossa Senhora do Pilar

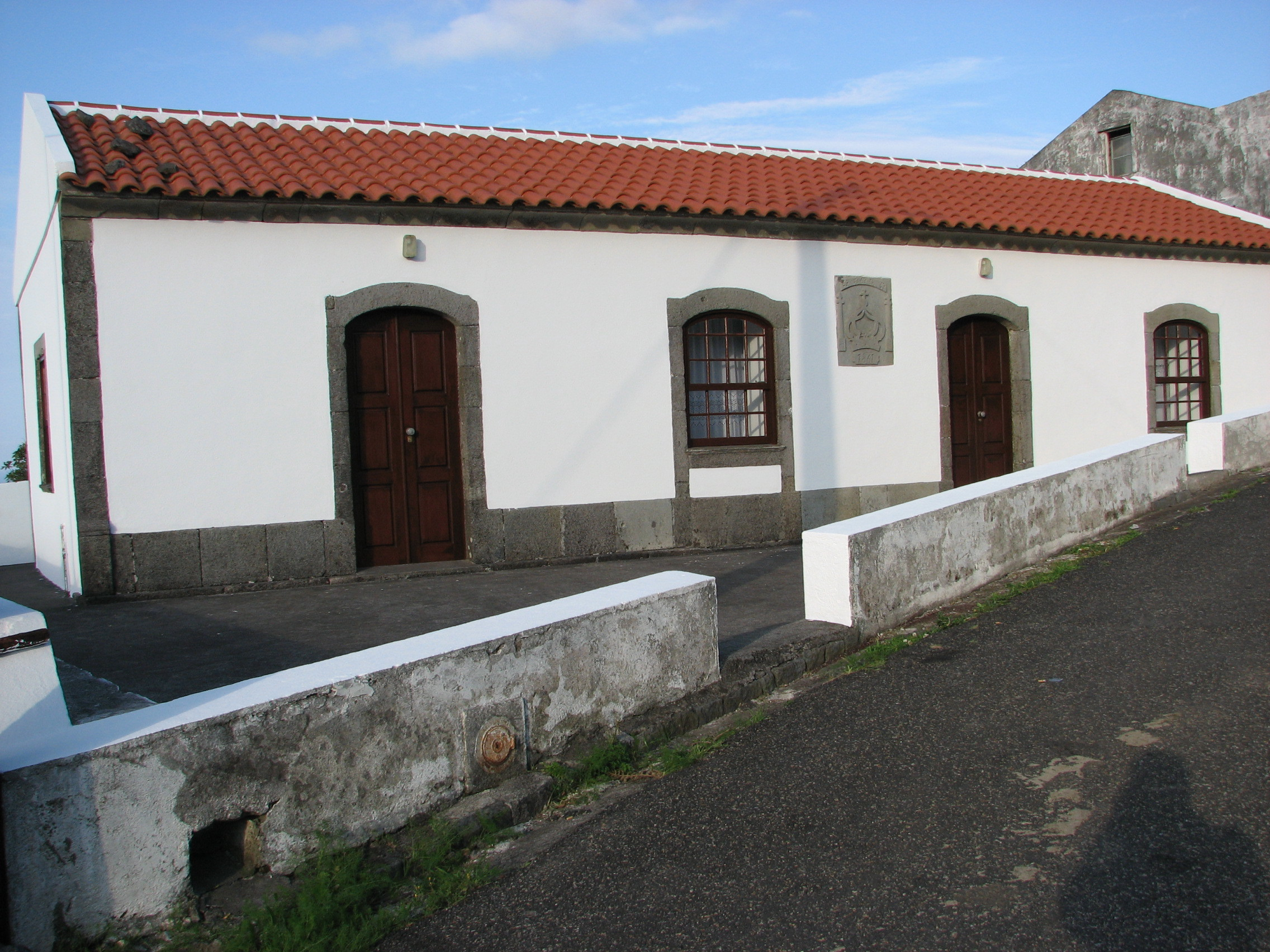
Casa do Espírito Santo de Baixo

Due to the difficulties associated with the region, its cliffs and climate in particular, settlement of this area developed during the late 15th century. From a small circle of three to four families, Cedros grew to about thirty neighbors by about 1715, according to Father António Cordeiro. The same author referred to the existence of the hamlet of Ponta Ruiva with a few residents and a small port, which were integrated into the parish of São Pedro (in Ponta Delgada, Santa Cruz das Flores) at the time.

Although Cedros was considered a "breadbasket" of the region, it had an important place in the economy of the island for the abundance of the Azorean cedar (cedros-do-mato) because its lumber was used in the construction of ships for fishing, for the early homes and the implements used in agriculture. The fibers of the cedars were usually dried in the sun, and used to produce twine or ropes.

Ilhéu Furado and the anchorage of Alagoa was, for many decades, the natural access to the island of Flores when winds from the southeast were strong. Alagoa was the heart of Cedros, due to its access to the sea, and connection to the interior pasturelands and orchards.

The distance between Cedros and Ponta Ruivo from their respective parishes, the mountainous cliffs and valleys and climate, made the residents petition the Bishop of Angra, at the time Friar Clement Vieira, to de-annex their localities from their respective parishes. By doing so, the residents would constitute their own parish and construct a church, to the invocation of Nossa Senhora do Pilar, at their own cost. The Captain-major at the time, D. Martinho de Mascarenhas (sixth Count of Santa Cruz) also supported the claims of the citizens, and offered to build a chapel and to donate a statue of Senhora do Pilar. After bishop António Álvares Pereira de Sousa visited the community in 1690, and after having agreed to elevate the community to parish he died, and the decision was delayed. Finally, Cedros, Ponta Ruiva and possibly Alagoa, were elevated to parish on July 9, 1693, a community of 176 inhabitants in 50 homes. Father Domingos Furtado de Mendonça was its first parish priest, he had an annual pay of about 24$000 réis, two parts in wheat and one in cash, of which he paid a portion to the Count of Sant Cruz. Faithful to their promise the residents constructed a new church, completed in 1693, and which the Count complied in donating the new chapel, completed in 1719. Inscriptions on two rocks found during demolition on the church in September 1945 confirm these facts, as well as a shield of D. Martinho de Mascarenhas and cross etched with 1693 and 1719, respectively. The church was reconstructed in 1822, but by 1868 a report by the Civil Governor of the District of Horta, António José Vieira Santa Rita, considered the building to be in a bad state of conservation.

Until the 20th century it was common for many Cedrenses, much like most poor in the Azores, to travel shoeless, and brought their shoes, ties and some clothing in a satchel when traveling to the "cosmopolitan" community of Santa Cruz. Ironically, the community had a distinction for being the population with the lowest level of illiteracy on the island of Flores: a fact that was attributed to professor Fraga (their local school teacher), who died in 1929.

After the demolition of the insecure old church in September 1945, the cornerstone of the new church was planted on January 22, 1950, thanks to the efforts of its parish priest, Father José Maria Álvares, receiving its consecration on June 18, 1953.

Until 1966, when the French military base was constructed, there was no formal road connecting Cedros with Ponta Delgada. At that time, Cedros became the terminus of the road network from the south (ending at Ponta Ruiva), and Ponta Delgada was only accessible by trail or by sea (as the weather permitted).

== Geography ==
=== Physical geography ===
The parish is delimited by the deep river-valley of Alagoa in the south, and Ribeira dos Cedros to the north (which separates Cedros from the parish of Ponta Delgada). Much like the parish of the same name on Faial, the settlement was given its name for the abundance of cedar trees (cedros-do-mato, Juniperus brevifolia), used by the colonists for building during settlement in the 16th century. In fact, the availability of this wood allowed the growth of the community, which was located in a relatively isolated promontory along the coast. Gaspar Frutuoso, noted: "...there is a high cliff, projecting into the ocean, dressed in trees of cedar, laurel and white wood, it's [an area] populated by many of the Captain's wild goats [and whom]...living above are three or four neighbors...this is the area we call Cedros, for there are many there".

Two sheltered bays also guard the coast of Cedros: along the coast of the valley of Alagoa (where there are several islets), and in front of Ponta Ruiva, where a small port was located. The small rocky islets (of which Fragata, Garajau, Carneiros and the islet of Álvaro Rodrigues) are all rocky, shallow features; apart from the islet of Álvaro Rodrigues, which was cultivated until about the middle of the 20th century, the islets are uninhabitable and lack sources of water.

=== Ecoregions/Protected areas ===
- Park of Alagoa (Portuguese: Parque de Alagoa) - located near an uninhabited settlement, it is a natural extension of the Ribeira da Alagoa, the ravine and valley that divides the coast;
- Nature Reserve of Alagoa Bay Islets and Baixa do Moinho (Portuguese: Reserva Natural dos Ilhéus da Baía da Alagoa e Baixa do Moinho), a site of communitarian interest, that includes an area of 100 square metres (1,100 ft^{2}) around the islets of Alagoa, for the protection of marine flora and fauna, and especially for population of roseate and common terns. It is part of the larger Sítio de Importância Comunitária (SIC) Costa Nordeste (Northern Coastal Site of Communitarian Interest) management plan, that includes an area with specific restrictions on what uses (including fishing and tourism) and environmental restrictions;
- There are several lookouts/belvederes within the limits of Cedros that add to scenic nature of the community: Miradouro dos Caimbros, Miradouro do Poço Comprido, Miradouro da Rocha da Gata and the Miradouro da Tapada Nova.

=== Human geography ===
The development of this area is unique in the Azores (owing to the higher altitudes and the prominence of strong winds) resulting in very isolated communities, that now have become linked by the roadways. Consequently, the parish has developed into three localities:

- Cedros, the center of the parish, location of the parochial church, its small school (now closed as children are bused to the vila of Ponta Delgada);
- Ponta Ruiva, a small hamlet situated five kilometers northeast of Cedros on a high promontory by the sea;
- Alagoa, a site along the deep valley of Ribeira da Alagoa, about 1 kilometre (0.62 mi) south of Cedros, with few permanent residents, that was once the location of a small fort used for the defense of the coast from attacks by pirates or privateers.

== Economy ==
The parish maintains its traditional rural character; the majority of its inhabitants are involved in agriculture, principally the raising of cattle, although some carpentry and commercial activities occur in this zone. Milling was also important, resulting in the construction of several mills along the Ribeira das Barrosas and Ribeira da Alagoa.

Also, due to a micro-climate in the area of Alagoa, the parish enjoyed a period of fruit cultivation (something rare to the rest of the island), where oblong apples (similar to pears in shape) were grown. For many decades, the small port of Alagoa was the point of embarkation for orange exports from the valley; an example of success in a peripheral economy, orange exports were sent directly to England, by English and Portuguese ships.

== Architecture ==
=== Civic ===
- Alagoa, the uninhabited community, but not in a state of ruins, notable for several architectural important buildings used during the early history of the community, including mills and a main bridge constructed in the 15th century;
- Decorated Stone Rua da Igreja (Portuguese: Pedra Decorada na Rua da Igreja);
- Haylofts of Fajã dos Cedros (Portuguese: Palheiros à Fajã dos Cedros);
- Haylofts of Rua da Esperança (Portuguese: Palheiros Rua da Esperança);
- Kiln of Cedros (Portuguese: Forno aos Cedros);
- Kiln of Fajã dos Cedros (Portuguese: Furnas à Fajã dos Cedros)
- Ponta Ruiva, a small hamlet, architecturally similar to homes built in Vila do Corvo;
- Residence Rua Manuel Maria de Freitas (Portuguese: Casa de Habitação Rua Manuel Maria de Freitas)
- Watermills of Ribeira dos Moinhos (Portuguese: Moinhos de Água e Caminho à Ribeira dos Moinhos)

=== Military ===
- Artillery Battery of Alagoa (Portuguese: Bateria da Alagoa), located in a dominant position overlooking the Bay of Alagoa, it was constructed during a period of Cedros' history when raids by pirates were frequent.

=== Religious ===
- Church of Nossa Senhora do Pilar (Portuguese: Igreja Paroquial de Cedros/Igreja de Nossa Senhora do Pilar)
- Império of the Divine Holy Spirit de Cima (Portuguese: Império do Divino Espírito Santo das Casas de Cima), constructed in 1856, a building used in traditional Holy Spirit feasts
- Império of the Divine Holy Spirit de Baixo (Portuguese: Império do Divino Espírito Santo das Casas de Baixo), constructed in 1861, a building used in traditional Holy Spirit feasts
- Império of the Divine Holy Spirit of Ponta Ruiva (Portuguese: Império do Divino Espírito Santo de Ponta Ruiva), constructed in 1861, a building used in traditional Holy Spirit feasts

== Culture ==
=== Festivities ===
The parish realizes its principal festival in honor of Nossa Senhora do Pilar and São Roque on the third Sunday of August. It also follows the tradition of the festivals of the Holy Spirit which are common on the islands of the Azores, here celebrated on the Sunday of Pentecosts.

=== Tradition ===
Faithful to tradition, there is still a handicraft industry reproducing in miniature implements used in the agriculture, for sale to tourists.
