= Church of Nossa Senhora da Conceição (Santa Cruz das Flores) =

- Church of Our Lady of the Conception
- Igreja de Nossa Senhora da Conceição
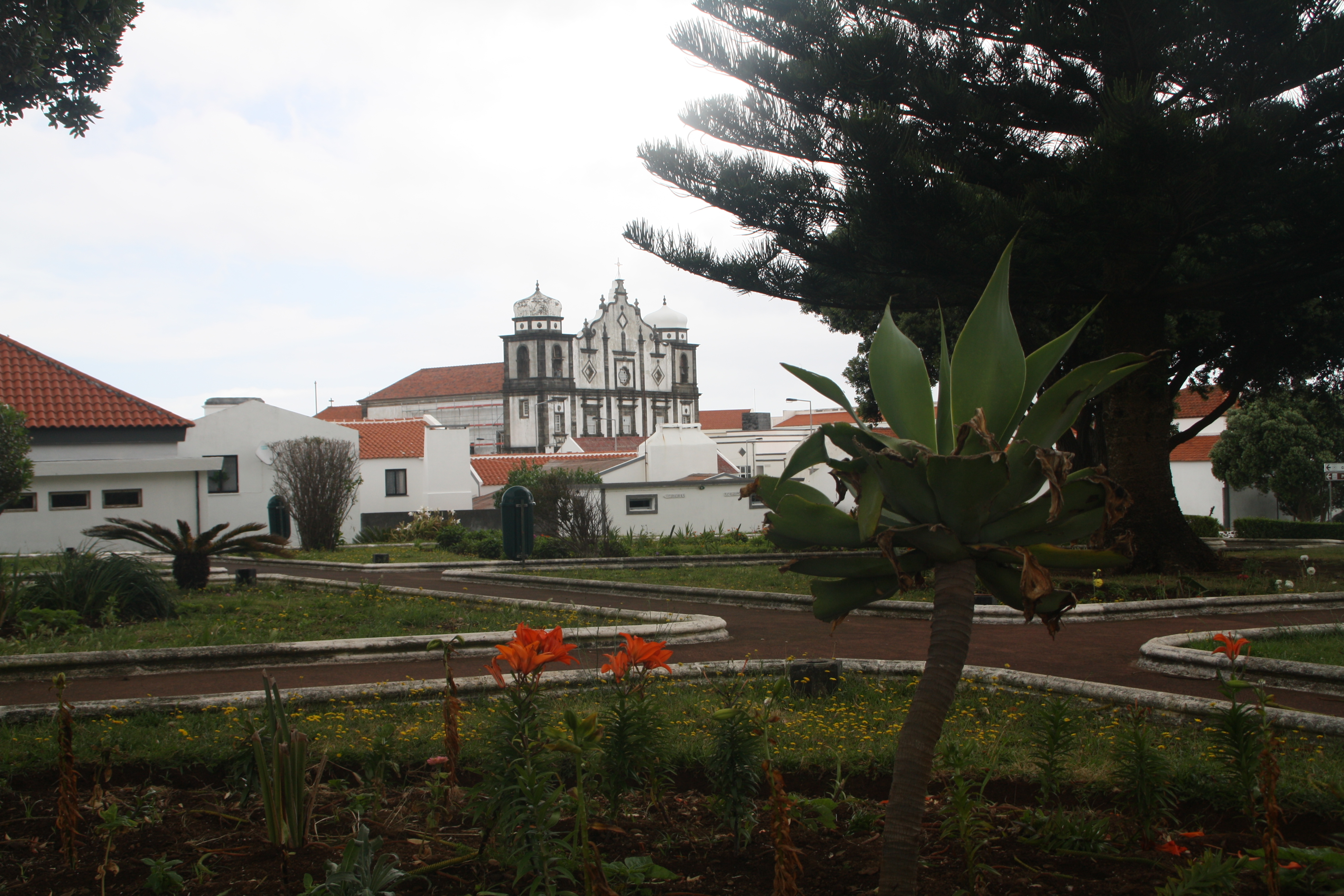
- A view of the Church of Nossa Senhora da Conceição, as seen from the main park in front of the Convent of São Boaventura
- Church of Nossa Senhora da Conceição
- 39°27′9.7″N 31°7′39.3″W
- Location: Flores, Western, Azores
- Country: Portugal

History
- Dedication: Virgin Mary

Architecture
- Style: Revivalist

Administration
- Diocese: Diocese of Angra

The Church of Nossa Senhora da Conceição (Portuguese: Igreja Paroquial de Santa Cruz das Flores/Igreja de Nossa Senhora da Conceição) is an 18th-century church located in the civil parish of Santa Cruz in the municipality of Santa Cruz das Flores, in the Portuguese island of Flores, in the archipelago of the Azores.

== History ==
The construction of the church began in 1781, on the site of a primitive temple in an area that was once the centre of the original town, under the direction of its first vicar, the Ouvidor Father Manuel Lourenço Vieira.

It was only 1859 that the church was consecrated; the delay in its construction is reflected in the facade which consists of two distinct styles, the last phase of poorer nature.

On 5 November 1998, a resolution by the president of the regional government (220/1998, JORAA, Série 1, 45) supported the classification of the property as a landmark of municipal importance. On 9 September 2004, it was reclassified under terms of Article 94 (Decree 107/2001) as a Imóvel de Interesse Público (Property of Public Interest).

== Architecture ==
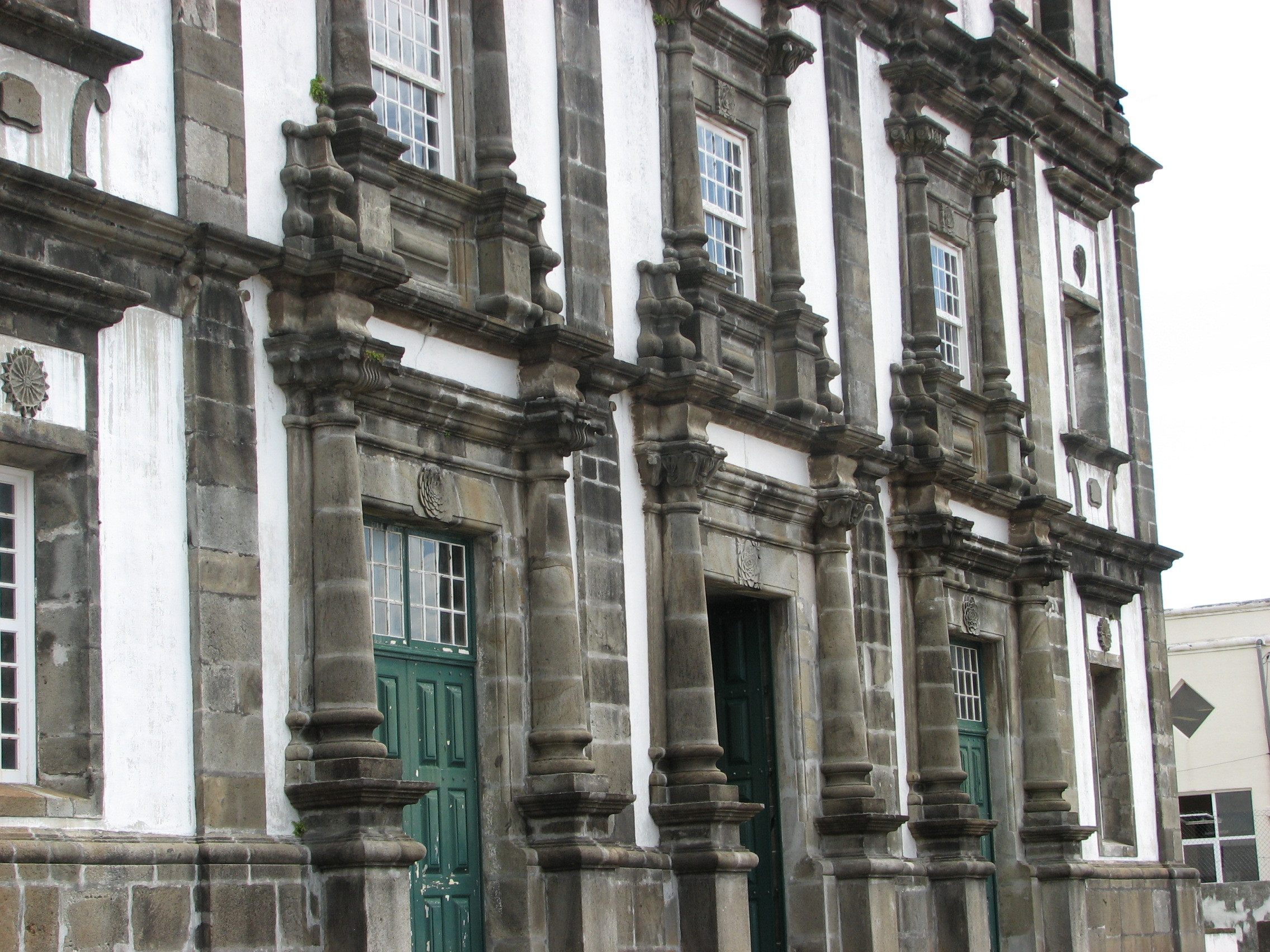
The imposing/bulky pedestals and pillars of the front facade

The church is situated to the left of the Praceta Roberto de Mesquita, incorporated into a walled garden with an octagonal reflecting pool. The large church (of great dimensions by Azorean standards) is situated in an elevated courtyard relation to the road, accessible by five large paved stairs with Portuguese pavement stone in a semi-circular form that amplifies the courtyard. The open space to the left of the church is defined by a lateral facade, tower and sacristy, as well as being paved in Portuguese pavement between stonework. The areas to the right facade are covered in grass. The building assumes an important position in Santa Cruz, being visible from most places in the town. It includes a principal body, a narrower chancel, two bell towers and annex structures on either side of the presbytery forming L-shaped extensions of the presbytery and nave. The entire building is constructed in masonry and stonework, plastered and painted in white, except for the soclos, cornerstone, cornices, pilasters, columns, frames, pinnacles and decorative elements, that include interior arches, pillars, corbels and stonework.

The principal facade is divided into three levels by cornices and three vertical sections by pilasters. On the ground floor, each section has a doorway, that corresponds to the three naves of the church. Framing the doorways are double lintels and cornices, with the doors flanked by large columns on pronounced pedestals. The capitals of the columns integrate into the cornice of the door, with the lateral columns topped by Ionic columns, while the central portico is topped by Corinthian columns. On the first lintel of each door is a rosette in relief, while above each capital is a bulky element that unites the cornice from the other levels. Over the cornice are vertical pinnacles above the columns.

The intermediary level is occupied a guillotine window per section, aligned to the doorway on the ground floor (but narrower). Each window is framed in a similar form of the doors, but with skirt between the pedestals and its columns. In each of the pedestals are inscriptions in Latin that read (from left to right):

CONCEPTIONEM, BEATÆ, VIRGINIS, MARIÆ, CUMGAUDIO and RECOLAMUS
Conception, Blessed, Virgin, Mary

Above the capitals of the columns are windows, which are more elaborated then the doors, bulky elements that connect the second cornice, to the upper (similar to the ones anterior).

The third level of the facade is divided into sections by the pilasters that rise from the preceding base into the curvilinear frontispiece topped by iron cross on a plinth. The pilaster divisions terminate in pinnacles just below the edge of the frontispiece. The central section has polylobal oculus framed by square stonework and cornice, from which rises a pilaster terminating at the central apex of the frontispiece in a diamond. Complementing the central oculus are lateral double-framed diamond-shaped oculi, surmounted by small niche in relief. Above each of the oculi is a linear cornice, supporting a segment of pilaster that terminates in another pinnacle that erupts from the frontispiece.

The bell towers are implanted on either side of the facade, divided into three sections by the extension of the cornices. The ground floor section includes a guillotine window with simple stonework frame, which is repeated in the second section. The framed window valance is decorated with a small central rosetta, although the second-floor window also includes a larger shell-like element of larger dimensions. Over the sill is a cornice, supported by two half-scrolls that define the skirt, with an incomplete cartouche in their centre. Above this section is the belfry, with an archway on each of the three principal faces, defined by an extension of the stonework that begins at the base. The towers are topped by a cornice and surmounted by a bulbous octagonal cupola over a drum, and surmounted by pinnacle.

The doors of the lateral facades are framed by a double lintel and cornice and flanked by pilasters over high, framed pedestals. A second cornice is situated above these doors, separated from the first by small extensions of the pilasters, and decorated by a pinnacle on either extreme, where a window is placed.

=== Interior ===
The interior consists of three naves divided by two lines of five arches supported by square pillars over protruding pedestal, base and capitals. The axial doorway is protected by a wooden windbreak, supporting a high-choir that occupies the first part of the naves (whose pillars are lower and support the walls that divided the choir in three sections. The supports for the central section are reinforced by four pillerettes in wood (two of smaller dimensions) connected to the windbreak, with the connection between the three sections accomplished through the doors. In addition to a central organ, on either side of the choir there are doorways that connecting it to the bell towers. These doorways are framed by stonework and double lintel, surmounted by cornice.

On the ground floor, on the epistole side, is a door that connects it to the interior of the tower, with staircase to the choir. On each of the pillars in the first part of the nave are holy water fonts in the form of conche shells. On the opposite side, is a section with rounded archway over pillars to the baptistry, located at the base of the left bell tower, and covered in vaulted ceiling and decorated in corner stonework, topped by cornice and its walls in polychromatic azulejo tile. The left wall includes a rectangular niche. The lateral interior doorways are located at the third part of the nave. To the right of the ambo is holy water fonte in conche shell. Above the level of the doors, on either wall, are four windows situated at different heights. On the third pillar from the entrance, on the ambo side, is the pulpit over corbel, with wooden guardrail and balustrade, accessible by staircase in stone. On the fifth part of the nave, over elevated step (representing the presbytery) is a door on either wall of the lateral nave: the ambo side accessing the sacristy and the epistole side to a small rectangular chapel, actually used for storage. These two doorways are similarly decorated as the doorway to the bell tower: framed by double-lintel and surmounted by conche shell in relief, and two pinnacles on either edge.

The triumphal archway is supported by pedestal, base and capitals. On either side of the archway, at the front of the lateral naves, are retables, surmounted by cornices and topped circular oculi. Above the triumphal archway, the frontispiece is divided by cornice that separates a decorative/symbolic element and six stars from a rectangular window. The presbytery and chancel is as deep as the central nave. On the ambo-side is a door that provides access to the storage room with two windows, and on the opposite wall a similar configuration (although the door is closed-off). At the foot of the main chapel, in an elevated space is the retable which (similar to the lateral retables) is decorated in Revivalist gilded and painted woodwork, which is almost Neoclassic in its style. The vaulted ceiling and walls are painted in figurative panels encircled by decorative motifs. The ceilings of the three naves, chapel, sacristy and lateral chapel (storage) are constructed in wood producing a vaulted appearance, supported by large cornices. The ceilings of the naves and sacristy are painted in blue.
