= José António Camões =

Father José António Camões (December 1777 – 18 January 1827) was a Portuguese Catholic priest, poet and historian. He wrote several works of satire, including his heroic satire O Testamento de D. Burro, Pai dos Asnos (The Testament of D. Burro, Father of the Asses).

== Early life ==
Thought to be the son of friar Manuel de São Domingos, a Franciscan friar in the Convent of São Boaventura (Santa Cruz das Flores, and a Corvino woman, and raised in the public system, he was baptized in the parochial church of Fajãzinha, on 13 December 1777, at about two or three years of age, and given only the name José, without a family surname. He was raised for a while on the island of Corvo, by his maternal grandparents, but accompanied friar São Domingos, as a student, to the Convent of São Boaventura after the friar visited Corvo.

After a difficult period in the convent, he abandoned his studies to work for a farmer (a family relative) in Fajãnzinha. Expelled from his first job, he went to work for another farmer, where he accompanied the farmer's son, Manuel Fernandes de Barcelos (1774–1854) in his studies.

By 1797, he was a professor of Latin in the parish of Santa Cruz. He later left for Terceira, where began his studies at the Convent of São Francisco; it was at this time that he adopted the surname Camões (the choice of name was inspired by his admiration for the famous Portuguese poet. After a long process, beginning in 1799, he was promoted by the Ecclesiastical Tribunal of Angra and given access to higher ecclesiastical rights (something that, by being abandoned, he could not achieve). He was ordained on 20 October 1804 in Angra, by special appointment of the Captain-General (dated 18 December 1804), and became a professor of Latin Grammar to the island of Flores (3 April 1805). With the permission of the parish, he was re-baptized on 16 July 1805 in Fajãzinha; one of his first acts as parish priest. He was very successful in his role as professor, attracting many students from Corvo and Faial.

In 1807, he was nominated vicar of the remote community of Ponta Delgada das Flores (a community that is more easily reached by boat than overland) and ceased his activities as professor (although some would follow him to the isolated community to continue their studies). While in Ponta Delgada, he was vice-vicar and then vicar, eventually attaining the role of ecclesiastical confessor for the islands of Flores and Corvo (1810), a role unpopular with some people because of his illegitimate birth. In 1812 he became clerical examiner, and in 1813, the receiver-general for the church in Corvo.

=== Author ===
José António Camões' first published works developed as a response to his critics (in 1812 or 1813) who had challenged his illegitimacy; he responded them in a weighty diatribe (in prose and verse) titled Sete Pecados Mortais (Seven Deadly Mortal Sins). He would write his seminal work O Testamento de D. Burro, Pai dos Asnos (The Testament of Dom Donkey, Father of the Asses), an apparently autobiographical account of his life, in prose, in which he described discrimination and maltreatment as a child and youth (by his maternal grandparents and familiars) for being of illegitimate birth, and those events that had plagued his life: he was careful to skewer many in Florense society, especially the local clergy.

His manuscript circulated in the communities of Flores, but eventually reached the bishopric of Terceira, which was without a bishop at the time (the 24th Bishop of Angra, D. José Pegado de Azevedo, had died on 19 June 1812 and his successor, friar D. Alexandre da Sagrada Família, although arriving in the Azores in 1813, would not take on his duties until 1816). The diocesanal cleric received a copy of the work, charged José António, and eventually stripped him of his roles as confessor and vicar of Ponta Delgada on 19 May 1813. Camões also received a summons (20 June 1814) to appear in Angra (for which he complied on 11 October 1814) to justify his actions to the church prosecutor. He was accused of damaging the reputation of the church, but absolved, on 20 February 1815, after a humiliating trial. Although absolved, he was required to respond to the inquisitors of the Santa Sé (since many of his works were against church dogma). His role as vicar of Ponta Delgada (already opposed by many influential residents), confessor and receiver for the islands were never reinstated. He solicited the intervention of the Captain-General, in order to be readmitted into his role as professor of Latin in Santa Cruz das Flores (a request that was also opposed by the bishopric in Angra, the residents of the municipality of Santa Cruz, and many on the island, until about 1822 or 1827): he was reinstated in 1815.

=== Later life ===
In disgrace, with few friends or students, he lived off handouts from church services or colleagues, but generally little food: he died in Ponta Delgada on 18 January 1827, at the age of 49.

José António Camões' manuscripts, for O Testamento de D. Burro, Pai dos Asnos and Sete Pecados Mortais, were posthumously re-printed in 1865 (in Boston) and 1883 (in Lisbon). His other works, particularly his sonnets were printed in the Jorgense (no.40) on 1 June 1873. Francisco Ferreira Drummond included one sonnet and one poem in his Anais da Ilha Terceira (1859 and 1864). Camões is also referred to in Relatório das Cousas mais Notáveis que Havião nas Ilhas Flores e Corvo a report to the Captain-General in 1822 (published in 1993).

== Published works ==
- Elegia escrita ao Secretário do Capitão General (1859)
- Soneto de repúdio à contra-revolução ocorrida em Angra a 3 de Agosto de 1823 (1864)
- Testamento de D. Burro, Pai dos Asnos (1865)
- Os Pecados Mortais. Diálogo Entre um Marido e sua Mulher no Qual Fazem uma Justa Paridade dos Sete Pecados Mortais com os Sete Clérigos que não Querem para Ouvidor Eclesiástico destas Duas Ilhas Flores e Corvo ao Padre José António Camões (1883)
- Soneto de louvor aos faialenese por se desligarem do governo de Angra (1873)
- Soneto de regozijo pela separação do governo do Faial do de Angra (1873)
- Soneto de louvor pela integração das ilhas das Flores e Corvo no governo do Faial (1873)
