= Church of São Pedro (Ponta Delgada, Flores) =

- Church of St. Peter
- Igreja de São Pedro
- Church of São Pedro
- 39°30′49.2″N 31°12′24.9″W
- Location: Flores, Western, Azores
- Country: Portugal
- Denomination: Roman Catholic

Architecture
- Style: Revivalist

Administration
- Diocese: Diocese of Angra

The Church of São Pedro (Portuguese: Igreja Paroquial de Ponta Delgada/Igreja de São Pedro) is a 17th-century church located in the civil parish of Ponta Delgada in the municipality of Santa Cruz das Flores, in the Portuguese island of Flores, in the archipelago of the Azores.

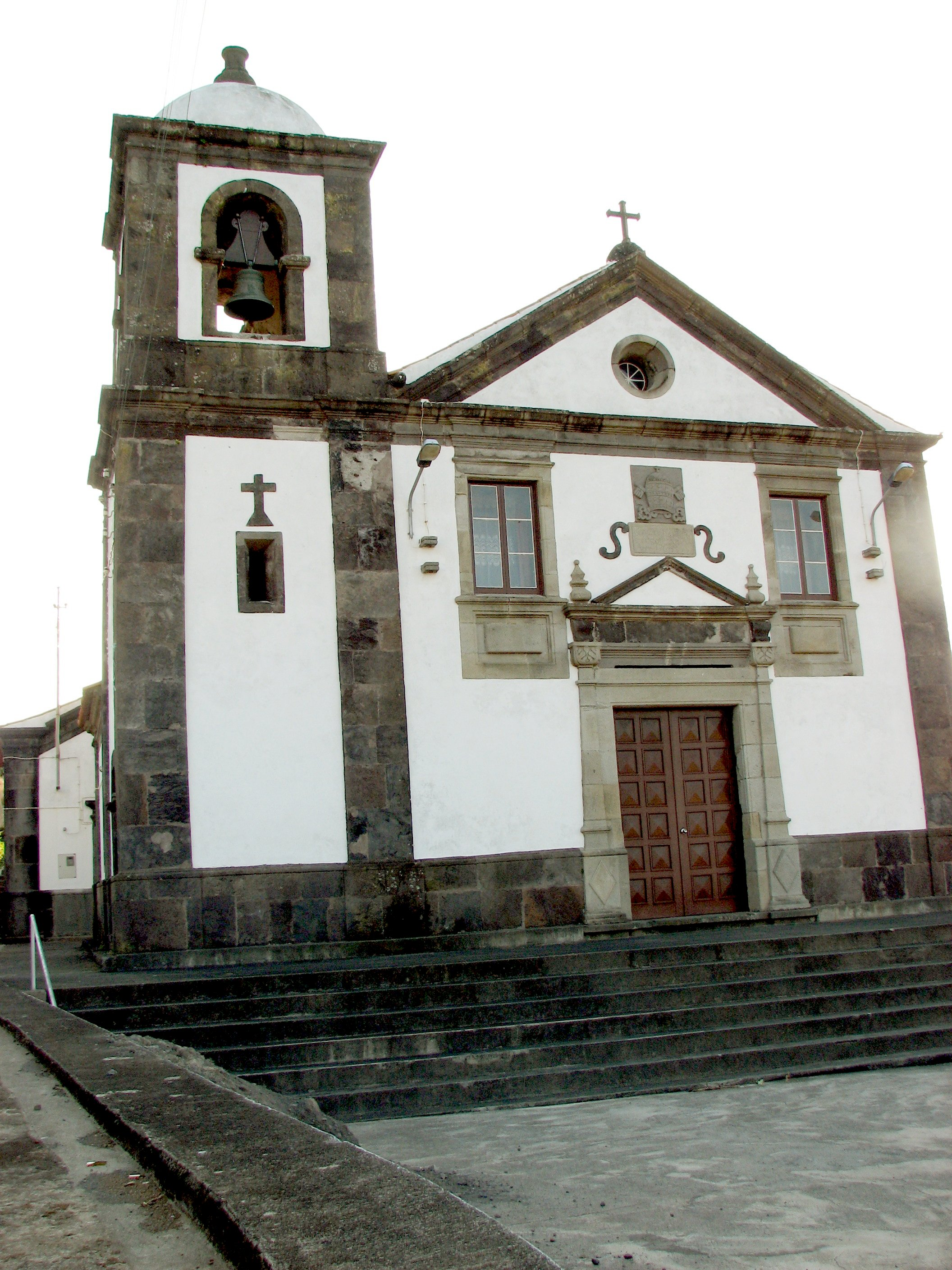
The front facade of the Revivalist church dating to the 18th century
