= Church of Nossa Senhora do Pilar (Cedros) =

- Church of Our Lady of the Pilar
- Igreja de Nossa Senhora do Pilar
- Location: Flores, Western, Azores
- Country: Portugal

Architecture
- Style: Revivalist

Administration
- Diocese: Diocese of Angra

The Church of Nossa Senhora do Pilar (Portuguese: Igreja Paroquial de Cedros/Igreja de Nossa Senhora do Pilar) is a 17th-century church located in the civil parish of Cedros in the municipality of Santa Cruz das Flores, in the Portuguese island of Flores, in the archipelago of the Azores.

== History ==
From the writings of Father António Cordeiros in 1715, thirty residents solicited the Bishop of Angra, then friar D. Clemente Vieira, to have Cedros de-annexed from the parish of Santa Cruz, and have a separate member of the curia assist their congregation. In order to justify this request the residents contributed, with their own funds, the cost to construct a church, to the invocation of Our Lady of the Pillar. The Captain-Donatary, D. Martinho Mascarenhas, 6th Count of Santa Cruz, offered to assist this group, with contributions to complete the retable of the new church and donation of an image of Senhora do Pilar.

It was only in 1690, that the deacon of the Sé Cathedral in Angra, owing to the death in office of the bishop, who emitted the necessary charter to authorize the de-annexation. On 9 July 1693, the locality of Cedros was raised to the status of parish, with its first priest being Father, Domingos Furtado de Mendonça, paid a stipend of 24$000 annually (two parts in wheat and the other in cash), paid for by the Commandery of the Islands of Flores and Corvo, then pertaining to the Count of Santa Cruz.

The church was concluded in 1693.

Its popularity meant that in 1719, the church was expanded; two tomb markers were discovered in the debris of the demolished church attesting to work done successively. One was a stone tablet with the coat-of-arms of the D. Martinho Mascarenhas and the other, a stone cross with the dates 1693 and 1719.

In 1822, the church was rebuilt.

In a report from the Civil Governor of the District of Horta, António José Vieira Santa Rita (dated 1868), the politician indicated that the church was in an advance state of ruin (with deteriorated parapets and ornaments) and that the cemetery was not being used. In fact, burials were being carried out in the church courtyard.

In September 1945, the old church was demolished, due to weaknesses in its structure. Religious services had already been transferred to the nearby Casa do Espírito Santo. The first cornerstone for the new church was laid on 22 January 1950, through the initiative of the vicar, Father Padre José Maria Alvares, and later inaugurated on 18 July 1953, its consecration presided by João de Fraga Vieira, vicar of Lomba. Following the mass, there was a solemn transference of the sacred sacramento from the Casa do Divino Espírito Santo to the new temple.
