= Santa Cruz das Flores =

- Municipality
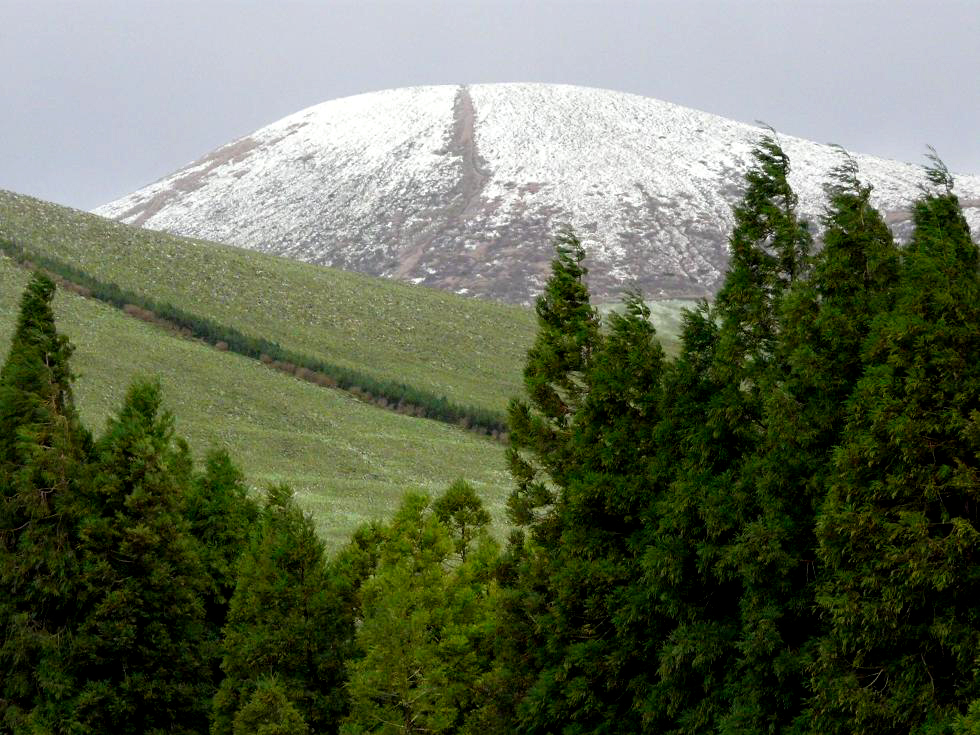
- Pico da Sé: a rare winter scene in the municipality of Santa Cruz das Flores

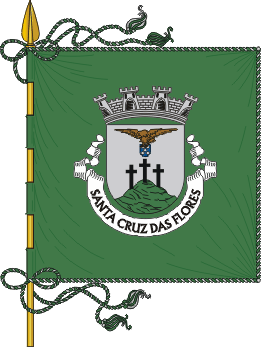
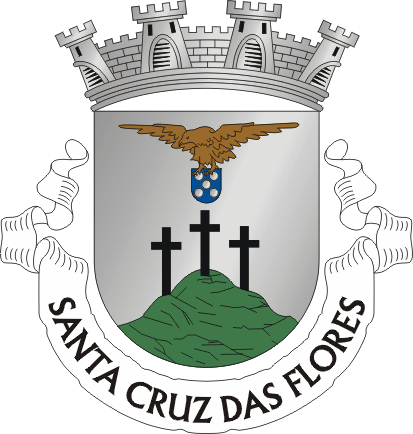
- Flag Coat of arms
- Interactive map of Santa Cruz das Flores
- Coordinates: 39°27′18″N 31°7′53″W
- Country: Portugal
- Auton. region: Azores
- Island: Flores
- Established: Settlement: c.1470 Municipality: c.1548
- Parishes: 4

Government
  - President: José Carlos Pimentel Mendes (PS)

Area
  - Total: 70.91 km^{2} (27.38 sq mi)
- Elevation: 35 m (115 ft)

Population (2021)
  - Total: 2,020
  - Density: 28.5/km^{2} (73.8/sq mi)
- Time zone: UTC−01:00 (AZOT)
  - Summer (DST): UTC+00:00 (AZOST)
- Postal code: 9970
- Area code: 292
- Patron: Nossa Senhora da Conceição
- Local holiday: (variable)
- Website: http://www.cmscflores.pt/

Santa Cruz das Flores (Portuguese pronunciation: [ˈsɐ̃tɐ ˈkɾuʒ ðɐʃ ˈfloɾɨʃ]; lit. '"Holy Cross of the Flowers"') is a municipality situated in the north half of the island of Flores, in the Portuguese archipelago of the Azores. Situated in the sparsely populated Western Group, the population in 2021 was 2,020 inhabitants in an area that covers approximately 70.91 square kilometres (27.38 mi^{2}), bordering the southern municipality of Lajes das Flores.

== History ==
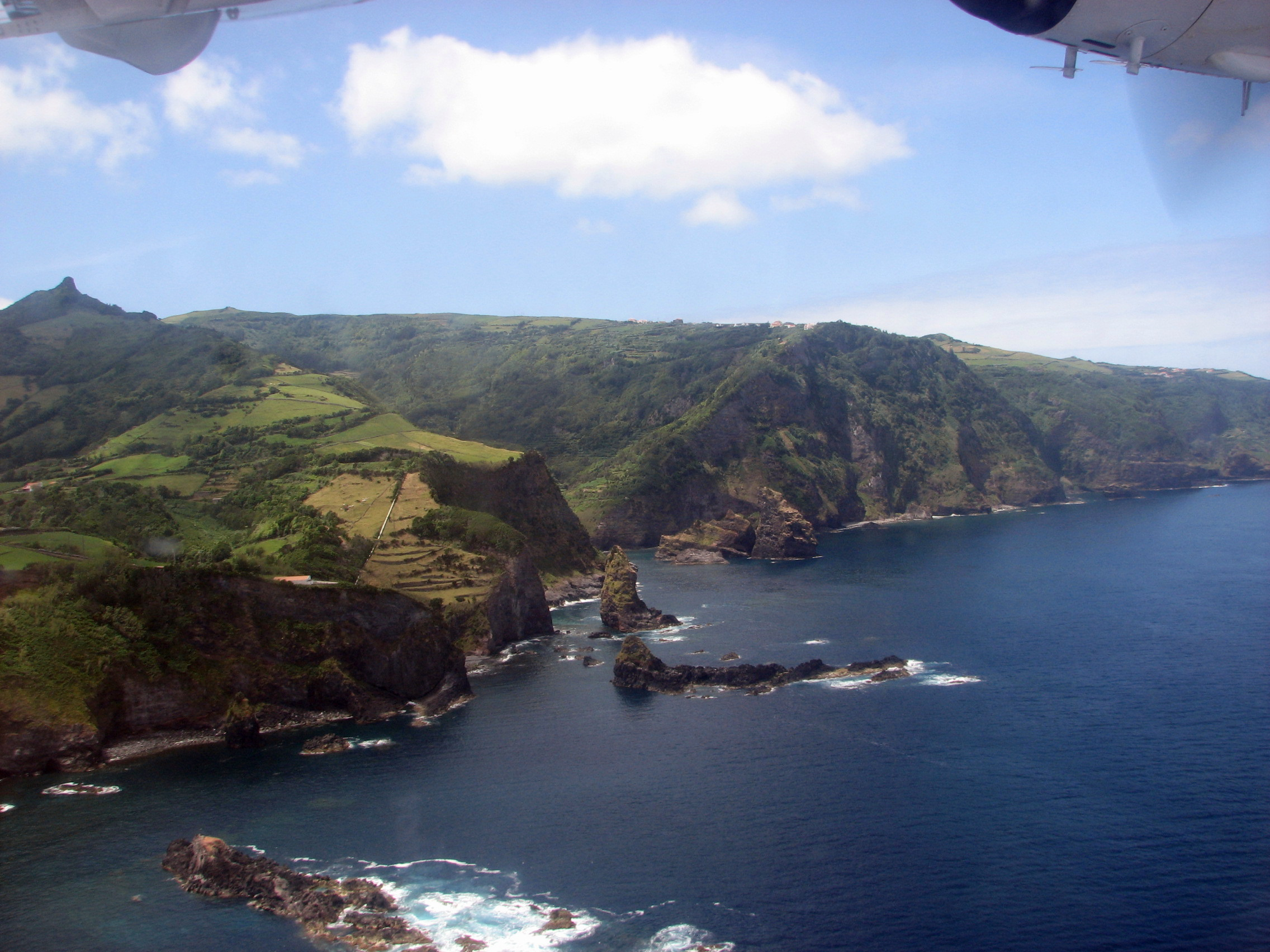
The Bay of Alagoa, a point where farmers exported oranges and where imports to the north eastern part of the island were channelled

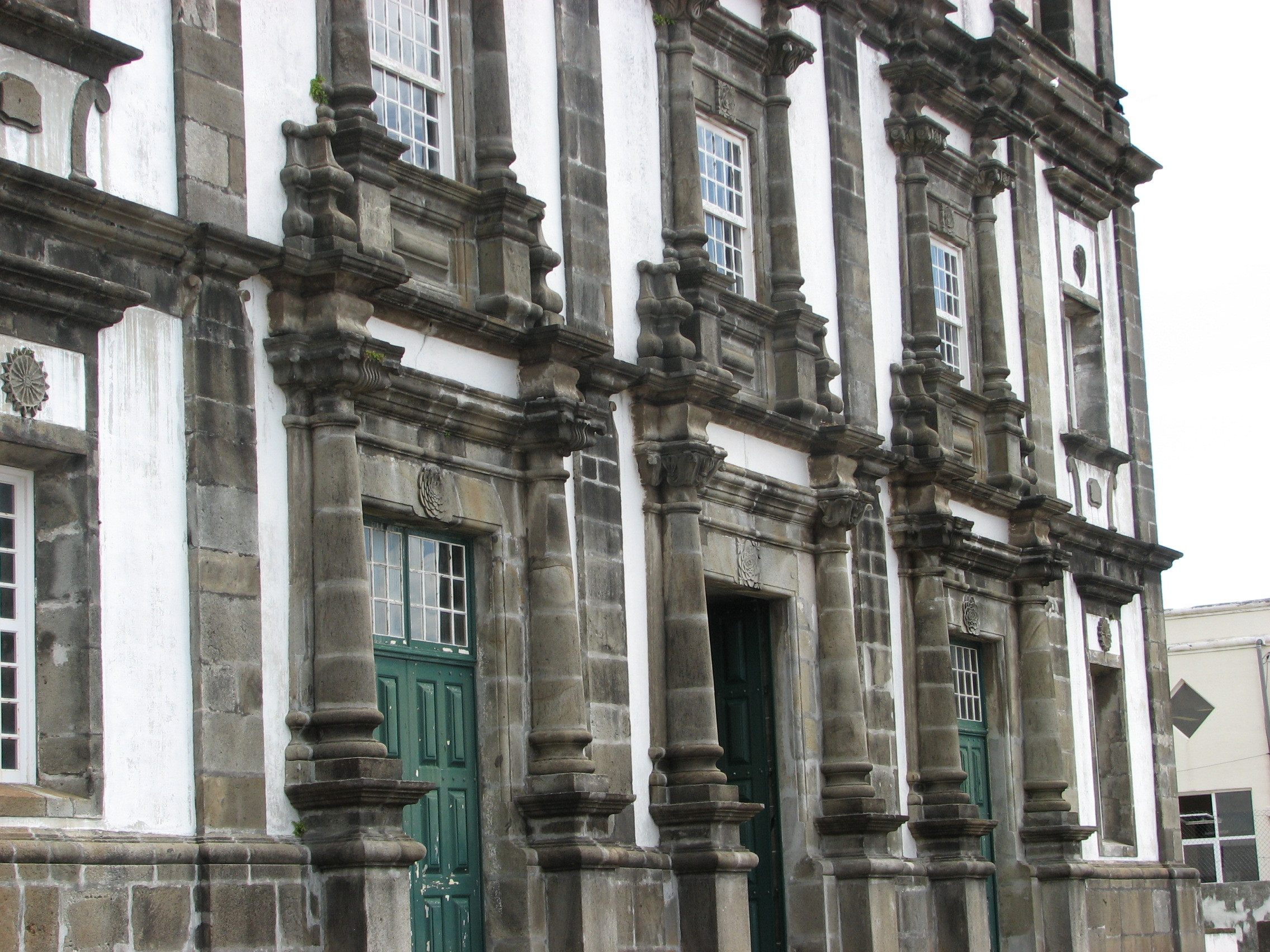
The ornate facade of the Church of Nossa Senhora da Conceição, the centre of religious life until the expulsion of the religious orders

The earliest record of the northern municipality referred to the village of Santa Cruz das Flores, in 1548. Transcribing the works of Father [Gaspar Frutuoso], Francisco Gomes documented the arrival of the crew of the nau Nossa Senhor da Misericórida. He included Gaspar Frutuoso's 1589 reference, described the growing urban area of Santa Cruz as a "well divided and plane villa" covered in thatched roofs. Ponta Delgada, he continued, was a parish of 30 neighbours surrounding its small hermitage (dedicated to Santo Amaro, even as its ecclesiastical patron since the 16th century was the apostle Peter).

In the beginning of the 17th-Century Diogo das Chagas, referred to the villa of Santa Cruz as the "head of the island" and the center of the administration, noting "[the village]...is very well located with the best port on the island...". He described his hometown as built on "firm foundations", delimited by its interlocking roads that began at the Santa Cruz sandbar and the other the port of Poças, all in the direction of Monte Calvário (today, Monte das Cruzes). He described "...the first road of the village and from the Porto das Poças another road, which is the last in the village, and where the rest of the roads intersect...". This year marked the municipal administration of the northern half of the island; part of the administrative regalia, was the obligatory construction of a lighthouse.

A primitive church, dating to the 16th century and constructed in 1627, by vicar Inácio Coelho, who in 1641 also provided land for the founding of the Franciscan Convent of São Boaventura, as well as the bread and wine for religious ceremonies.

By the end of 1693, Friar Agostinho de Mont'Alverne, referred to 9000 inhabitants, living in 180 homes, primarily in the village of Santa Cruz. These original settlers were Portuguese, primarily from the area of the Alentejo and Minho. It was about this time that the third oldest of the parishes was created by the Diocese in Angra, on 9 July 1693: Nossa Senhora do Pilar, delimited by the ravines of Barrosas (in the north) and Alagoa (in the south). The two localities that formed the parish, Cedros and Ponta Ruiva, de-annexed from the parishes of São Pedro de Ponta Delgada and the Matriz de Nossa Senhora da Conceição, in Santa Cruz, included 50 homes and 176 people. With its presbytery and image of it patron saint provided by the Count of Santa Cruz, its primitive parochial church was later expanded in 1719 and reconstructed in 1822.

By 1717, Father António Corderio described a population of over 200 homes, on a plain surface, well constructed, with four roads that lead to the sea, cut by various lanes. Many of its roads were marked by iconic buildings, including the hermitage of St. Peter and main parochial church (which continued to be constructed and reconstructed into the 18th century), in addition to the hermitages of São Sebastião, Santa Catarina, and the Franciscan Convent of São Boaventura (founded in 1641 by father Inácio Coelho).

The parochial church of Ponta Delgada resulted from the reconstruction of the old hermitage, around 1763, under the initiative of Father Francisco de Fraga e Almeida. Initially, the parish also included the areas of Ponta and Ponta Ruiva, but which were later deannexed to form the parishes of the Fajãs (in 1676) and Nossa Senhora do Pilar (in 1693), respectively. About the same time, José António de Sousa Bettencourt, a natural and property-owner from the island of Graciosa, began constructing a hermitage in the area of Caveira, that was consecrated on 22 December 1763, to the invocation of the Sainted Souls of the Flames of Purgatory (Portuguese: Almas Santas do Fogo do Purgatório). At the time, the inhabitants (numbering about 100 in 32 homes) were subject to the "spiritual and corporal convenience" of the parish of São Caetano in Lomba, since July 1757. Unfortunately, this parish operated in the neighbouring municipality of Lajes, and the parishioners were required to trek the distance for services between valleys. This continued until 1833 and 1834, when the little settlement of Caveira was transformed into a parish, thereby obtaining the patron of Benditas Almas (Blessed Souls), from 1954 on the invocation of Nossa Senhora do Livramento (Our Lady of Freedom)).

Santa Cruz, around 1815, had already developed into a beautiful city, all but in name. But, as the old ecclesiastical ouvidor José António Camões observed, its principal roadways (Rua das Poças, Rua do Rego, Rua de Santa Catarina, Rua do Porto, Rua Nova and Rua de São Sebastião do Moio) and various lanes were irregular, as too were its buildings. Of the 429 buildings registered by the local administration, only 113 were covered by standard shingles of the period. Of the 419 people that inhabited the areas of Ribeira dos Barqueiros, Vales, Pampilhal, Fazenda and Além da Ribeira (there were no records for the centre of town), no one person used footwear. Poverty was a general condition, and the Donatários of the island (first the Fonsecas, later the Counts of Santa Cruz and finally Pedro José Caupers) subjugated the populace as serfs. The Crown had bestowed the lands, politico-military institutions and clergy for the islanders, but neglected the socio-political institutions that relegated, as Father Camões described: ...the inhabitants of the island of Flores [as the]...most poor and miserable of the universe (except for the Corvinos).

The cornerstone of the parochial church of Caveira was placed on 13 June 1870, and its construction was completed on 11 September 1880, with the consecration of the altar.

Since 7 January 1841, the villa of Santa Cruz, was the judicial center for the dual-administration of Flores and Corvo (the Western archipelago); the justice system was handled from Santa Cruz, although a magistrate came from off-island. Santa Cruz grew and quickly surpassed Lajes demographically and in its economic position, finally coopting the politics in the two islands in 1895. On the 18 November of that year, the municipality of Lajes was made redundant, and along with Corvo, it became an integrated municipality from 1895 to about 1898. In 1898, the counsel José Luciano de Castro undertook the restoration of the individual administrative divisions.

Alleging problems with the firmness of its lateral walls, the parochial church of Cedros was demolished in September 1945, and a new temple constructed: it was consecrated on 18 June 1954.

== Geography ==
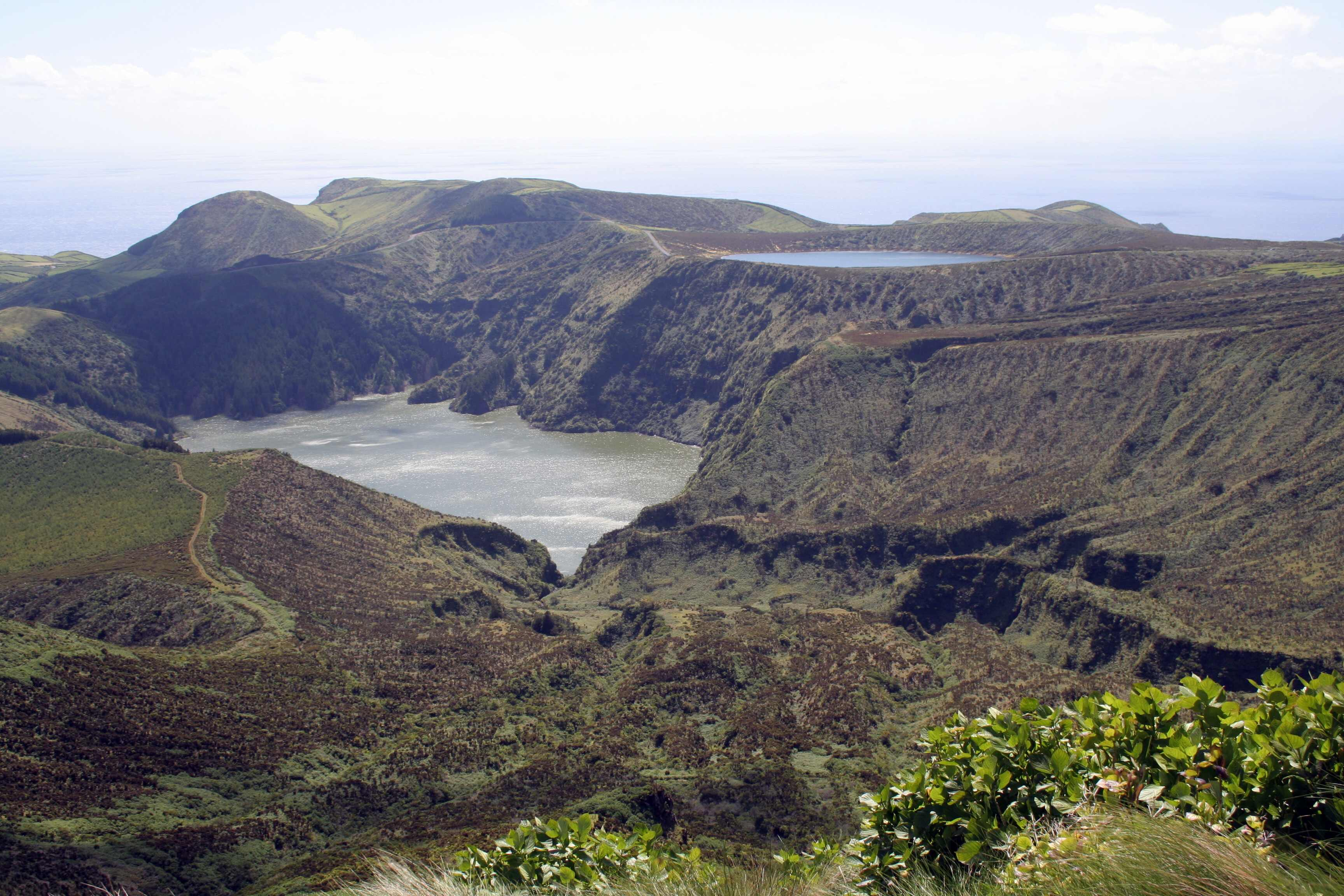
The twin lakes of Lagoa Funda and Lagoa Rasa, located in the central part of the municipality, and part of the Caldeira Funda Natural Forest Reserve

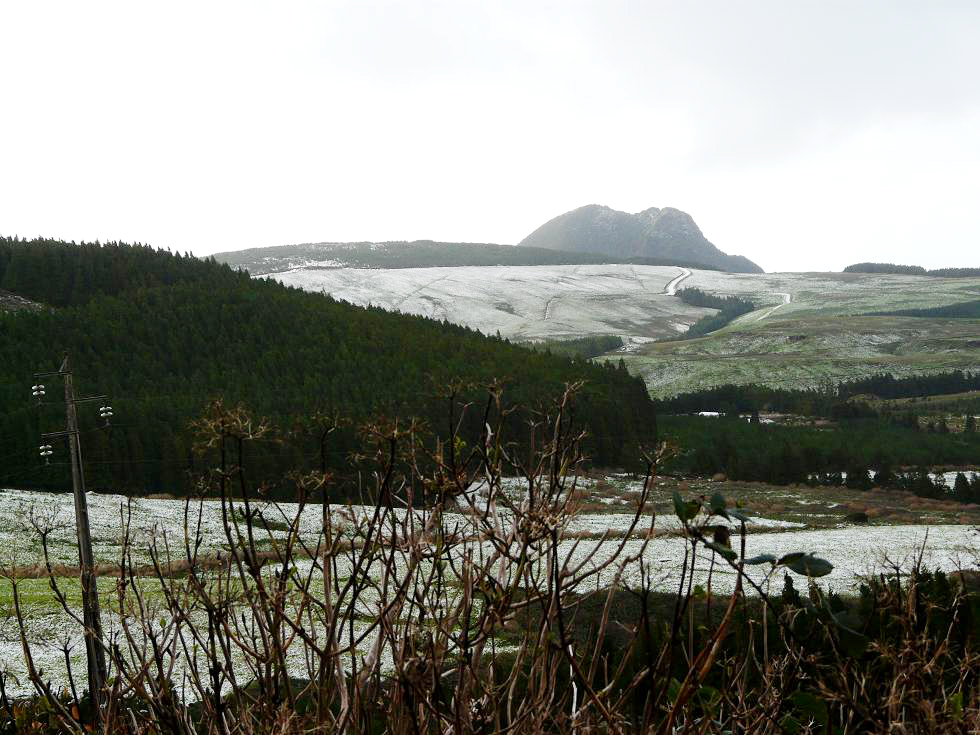
A view of Pico dos Sete Pés, one of the peaks that mark the interior of Santa Cruz

=== Physical geography ===
As part of a volcanic island, the municipality of Santa Cruz das Flores offers several scenic vistas, with extinct volcanic cones and lakes in an area generally rugged. It is a natural garden, whose principal activities includes floral-culture and the ubiquitous Azorean dairy industries. The only significantly level ground is occupied by its primary center, Santa Cruz das Flores (parish), located on the eastern coast and near the municipal border with Lajes das Flores. Apart from a commercial center, it is the home of the island's only airport and secondary school.

To the north, along the only roadway, is the hamlet of Fazenda de Santa Cruz, noted for its Forest Reserve (Reserva Florestal da Fazenda de Santa Cruz), artificial lake and the island's only electrical station (constructed in 1967). The park is home to a small spawning program for trout, provides sites for picnicking, location of deer pens and an abundance of endemic plant species.

At the end of the Regional Road is the community of Ponta Delgada a coastal community with a line of sight to Corvo, as well as many sheltered coves and bays. The Gruta dos Encharéus (an enormous coastal grotto 50 meters long by 25 wide), the Gruta do Galo, the islets of Maria Vaz, Cartário, Abrões, Muda, Pão de Açúcar and Furado, as well as the plains of Ponta Delgada, Moinho and Vermelha, among others, are natural symbols of the coast of this municipality.

=== Ecoregions/Protected areas ===
The western and interior parts of the municipality are largely vacant of inhabitants and unspoiled by development, partly responsible for the island's biodiversity being recognized by UNESCO (May 26, 2000). Many of the islands natural resources are located in this region, which includes Morro Alto (the highest point in the municipality and island at 915 meters) and the following natural sites of community interest:

- Recreational Forest Reserve Luís Paulo Camacho Portuguese: Reserva Florestal de Recreio Luís Paulo Camacho)
- Natural Forest Reserve of Caldeira Funda (Portuguese: Reserva Florestal Natural da Caldeira Funda)
- Natural Forest Reserve of Caldeira Rasa (Portuguese: Reserva Florestal Natural da Caldeira Rasa)
- Natural Forest Reserve of Morro Alto e Pico da Sé (Portuguese: Reserva Florestal Natural do Morro Alto e Pico do Sé)

In addition to the Forest Reserves, the municipality is bisected by a series of pedestrian hiking trails, that skirt the coastal areas and the interior. These trails, at many levels of endurance, include trips that cover: Ponta Delgada, Cedros, Ponta Ruiva, the village of Santa Cruz, Fazenda, Monte, Vales, Ribeira dos Barqueiros and even the smaller parish of Caveira.

=== Climate ===
Santa Cruz das Flores has a humid subtropical climate (Cfa) with very mild, rainy winters and warm to hot summers. It has the highest rainfall of all the Azores’ islands and owing to the influence of the Gulf Stream the mildest winters of any place so far from the equator. However, the warm Gulf Stream waters mean rain falls on two-thirds of all days during the year and humidity averages around 80 percent.

Climate data for Santa Cruz das Flores, Azores (1981–2010 normals, sun hours 1971-2000 & humidity 1921–1950)
Month	Jan	Feb	Mar	Apr	May	Jun	Jul	Aug	Sep	Oct	Nov	Dec	Year
Record high °C (°F)	21.1 (70.0)	21.0 (69.8)	21.8 (71.2)	22.5 (72.5)	25.3 (77.5)	26.9 (80.4)	29.8 (85.6)	30.4 (86.7)	29.6 (85.3)	26.6 (79.9)	25.0 (77.0)	23.1 (73.6)	30.4 (86.7)
Mean daily maximum °C (°F)	17.0 (62.6)	16.7 (62.1)	17.1 (62.8)	18.0 (64.4)	19.5 (67.1)	21.8 (71.2)	24.6 (76.3)	25.7 (78.3)	24.4 (75.9)	21.8 (71.2)	19.3 (66.7)	17.8 (64.0)	20.3 (68.6)
Daily mean °C (°F)	14.5 (58.1)	14.1 (57.4)	14.6 (58.3)	15.4 (59.7)	16.9 (62.4)	19.0 (66.2)	21.7 (71.1)	22.8 (73.0)	21.6 (70.9)	19.2 (66.6)	16.9 (62.4)	15.3 (59.5)	17.7 (63.8)
Mean daily minimum °C (°F)	11.9 (53.4)	11.5 (52.7)	12.0 (53.6)	12.7 (54.9)	14.2 (57.6)	16.2 (61.2)	18.8 (65.8)	19.8 (67.6)	18.8 (65.8)	16.5 (61.7)	14.4 (57.9)	12.8 (55.0)	15.0 (58.9)
Record low °C (°F)	2.1 (35.8)	4.0 (39.2)	3.4 (38.1)	5.0 (41.0)	9.0 (48.2)	9.2 (48.6)	11.4 (52.5)	13.8 (56.8)	11.4 (52.5)	9.1 (48.4)	6.5 (43.7)	5.4 (41.7)	2.1 (35.8)
Average rainfall mm (inches)	197.1 (7.76)	171.3 (6.74)	155.0 (6.10)	104.4 (4.11)	105.6 (4.16)	97.3 (3.83)	60.6 (2.39)	68.0 (2.68)	123.9 (4.88)	179.5 (7.07)	179.6 (7.07)	223.9 (8.81)	1,666.2 (65.6)
Average rainy days (≥ 0.1 mm)	23.9	22.0	21.1	18.6	18.6	15.7	15.0	16.4	19.7	21.9	22.1	24.7	239.7
Average relative humidity (%)	80	80	80	80	81	82	81	80	81	79	79	80	80
Mean monthly sunshine hours	73.8	79.8	107.0	129.7	168.4	163.8	205.3	215.2	157.3	117.5	82.3	65.3	1,565.4
Mean daily sunshine hours	2.4	2.8	3.5	4.3	5.4	5.5	6.6	6.9	5.2	3.8	2.7	2.1	4.3
Source 1: Instituto de Meteorologia
Source 2: Instituto de Meteorologia (sun hours), Deutscher Wetterdienst (humidity 1921–1950)

=== Human geography ===
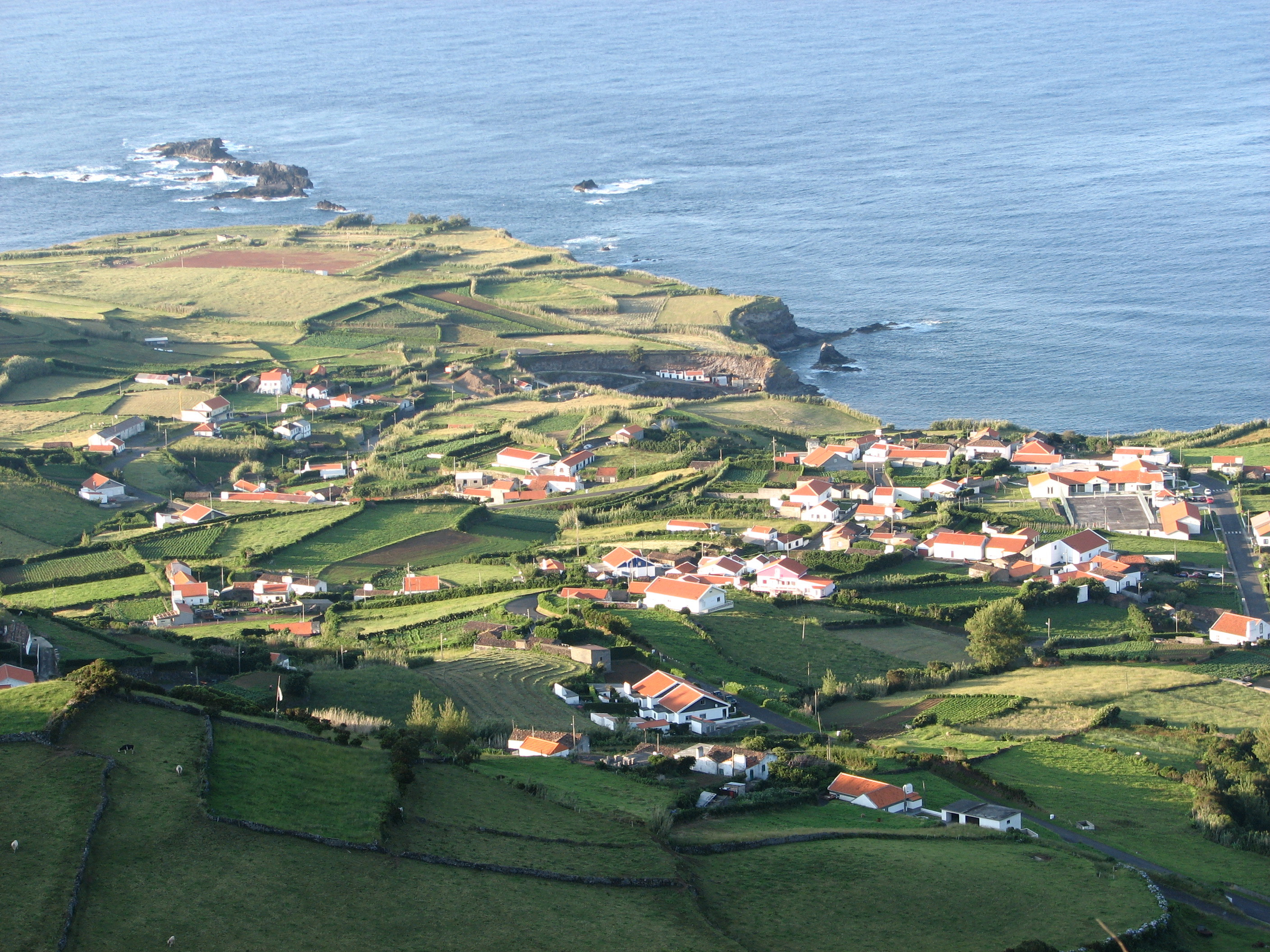
The northern centre of Ponta Delgada connecting Flores with Corvo

Population of Santa Cruz das Flores (1849 - 2004)
Year	Pop.	±%
1849	4,858	—
1900	3,629	−25.3%
1930	3,484	−4.0%
1960	3,207	−8.0%
1981	2,456	−23.4%
1991	2,628	+7.0%
2001	2,493	−5.1%
2011	2,289	−8.2%

Situated on the maritime coast, the urbanized area is situated on plateau demarcated by a western cliff and the main airport, and surrounded on its western edge by agricultural fields.

The municipality is administered by four civil parishes (Portuguese: freguesias) that include:

- Caveira - the smallest parish in size, bordering Lajes das Flores, with less than 100 inhabitants;
- Cedros - the "middle" parish that straddles the river-valleys of Alagoa Bay and historical location of orchards owing to its micro-climate;
- Ponta Delgada - third-largest community on the island, located along the northern coast;
- Santa Cruz das Flores - municipal seat, location of the airport and largest population (less than 2000 inhabitants).

Although the population of the municipality has remained relatively stable, it has seen a slow decrease over the years.

Since 2006, the local municipal government has developed many infrastructures, re-qualified many existing buildings, roads and improved the accessibility of existing localities. This included many improvements and expansion of roadways, provision of electrical, water and sanitary services, as well as the construction of new subdivisions (such as the Loteamento da Terça) and beautification programs.

== Architecture ==
=== Civic ===
- Lighthouse of Ponta do Albernaz (Portuguese: Farol da Ponta do Albernaz), inaugurated on 28 January 1925 as part of the Plano Geral de Alumiamento e Balizagem (General Illumination and Nautical Signalling Plan) for the northern coast of Flores, with the intent of providing a beacon for shipping passing through the Flores-Corvo;
- Municipal Library of Santa Cruz das Flores (Portuguese: Biblioteca Municipal de Santa Cruz das Flores)
- Museum Pimental de Mesquita (Portuguese: Casa-Museu Pimentel de Mesquita)
- Whaling Factory of Boqueiro (Portuguese: Fábrica da Baleia do Boqueirão)

=== Religious ===
- Church of Benditas Almas (Portuguese: Igreja Paroquial de Caveira/Igreja das Benditas Almas), around 1767 the first small church, was constructed under the initiative of José António de Sousa Bettencourt (dedicated to the Blessed Souls) on the site of today's cemetery, but the current church (of the same invocation) was only founded in 1867;
- Church of Nossa Senhora da Conceição (Portuguese: Igreja de Nossa Senhora da Conceição), the monolithic/bulky church of the Conception, sited on the primitive location of village temple, was initiated in 1781, but only completed a century later; for grande facade and ornate interior, the Regional Government classified this unique structure in the western group of islands as a Imóvel de Interesse Público;
- Church of Nossa Senhora do Pilar (Portuguese: Igreja de Nossa Senhora do Pilar), owing to its distance from Santa Cruz, the residents of Cedros solicited the Bishop of Angra, to Cedros de-annexed and its own curia installed. In order to justify this request the residents contributed, with their own funds to construct a church, supported by then-Captain-Donatary, D. Martinho Mascarenhas (6th Count of Santa Cruz), who contributed a retable and donated an image of Senhora do Pilar.
- Church of São Pedro (Portuguese: Igreja Paroquial de Ponta Delgada/Igreja de São Pedro), parochial church dedicated to St. Peter, constructed in 1763, promoted by Father Francisco de Fraga e Almeida, a man of great fortune, old vicar and Ouvidor for the islands of Flores and Corvo. The church was remodeled during the latter part of the 20th century;
- Convent of São Boaventura (Portuguese: Igreja e claustro do Convento Franciscano de São Boaventura), today home to the Museum of Flores, the Franciscan convent was built under the initiative of Inácio Coelho, then vicar of Santa Cruz. It is suggested that this church was originally conceived in fulfillment of a vow following the triumph of Portuguese forces over Spain during the Restoration War.
