= Santa Cruz das Flores (parish) =

- Civil parish
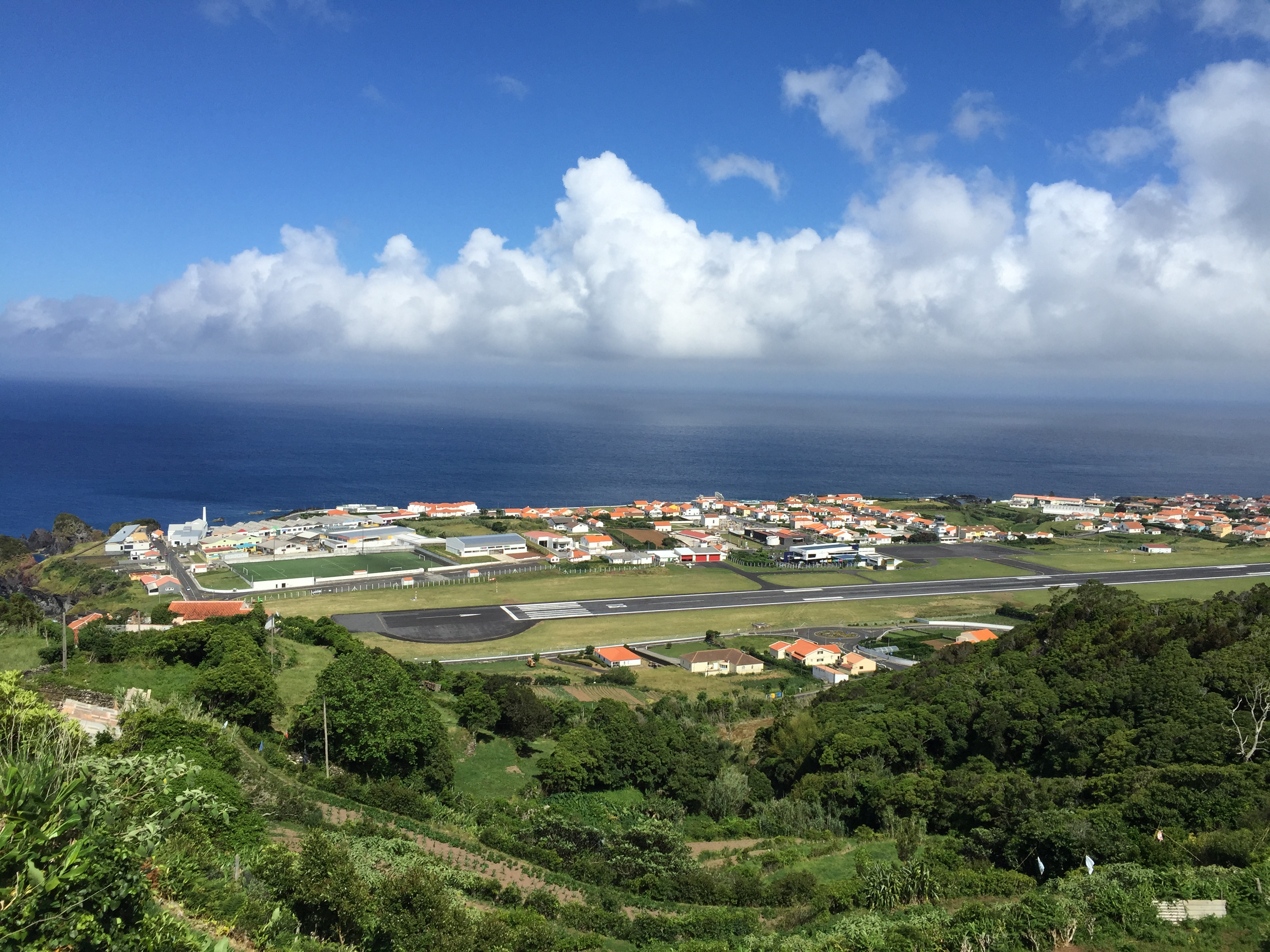
- View of the town and the airport

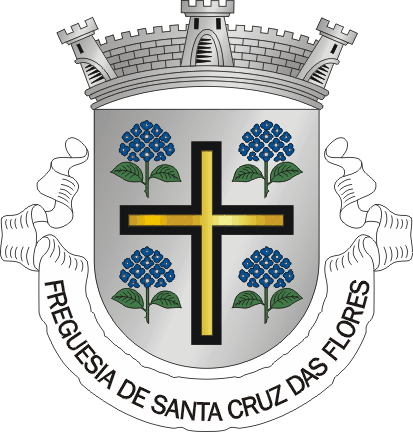
- Coat of arms

- Location in the Azores Santa Cruz das Flores (Flores Island (Azores))
- Coordinates: 39°27′9″N 31°7′39″W
- Country: Portugal
- Auton. region: Azores
- Island: Flores
- Municipality: Santa Cruz das Flores
- Established: Settlement: c.1508-1510 Parish: c.1548 Civil parish: 28 November 1684

Area
  - Total: 39.68 km^{2} (15.32 sq mi)
- Elevation: 29 m (95 ft)

Population (2021)
  - Total: 1,552
  - Density: 39.11/km^{2} (101.3/sq mi)
- Time zone: UTC−01:00 (AZOT)
  - Summer (DST): UTC+00:00 (AZOST)
- Postal code: 9970-331
- Area code: 292
- Patron: Nossa Senhora da Conceição
- Website: cmscflores.pt

Santa Cruz das Flores is a civil parish in the municipality of Santa Cruz das Flores, Azores, Portugal. The population in 2021 was 1,552, in an area of 39.68 km^{2}. It is the largest population center in the Western Group of the Portuguese Azores, concentrating all governmental and judicial services of the island. In addition, it is the site of the only secondary school, the civil airport, and the centers of health and commerce.

== History ==
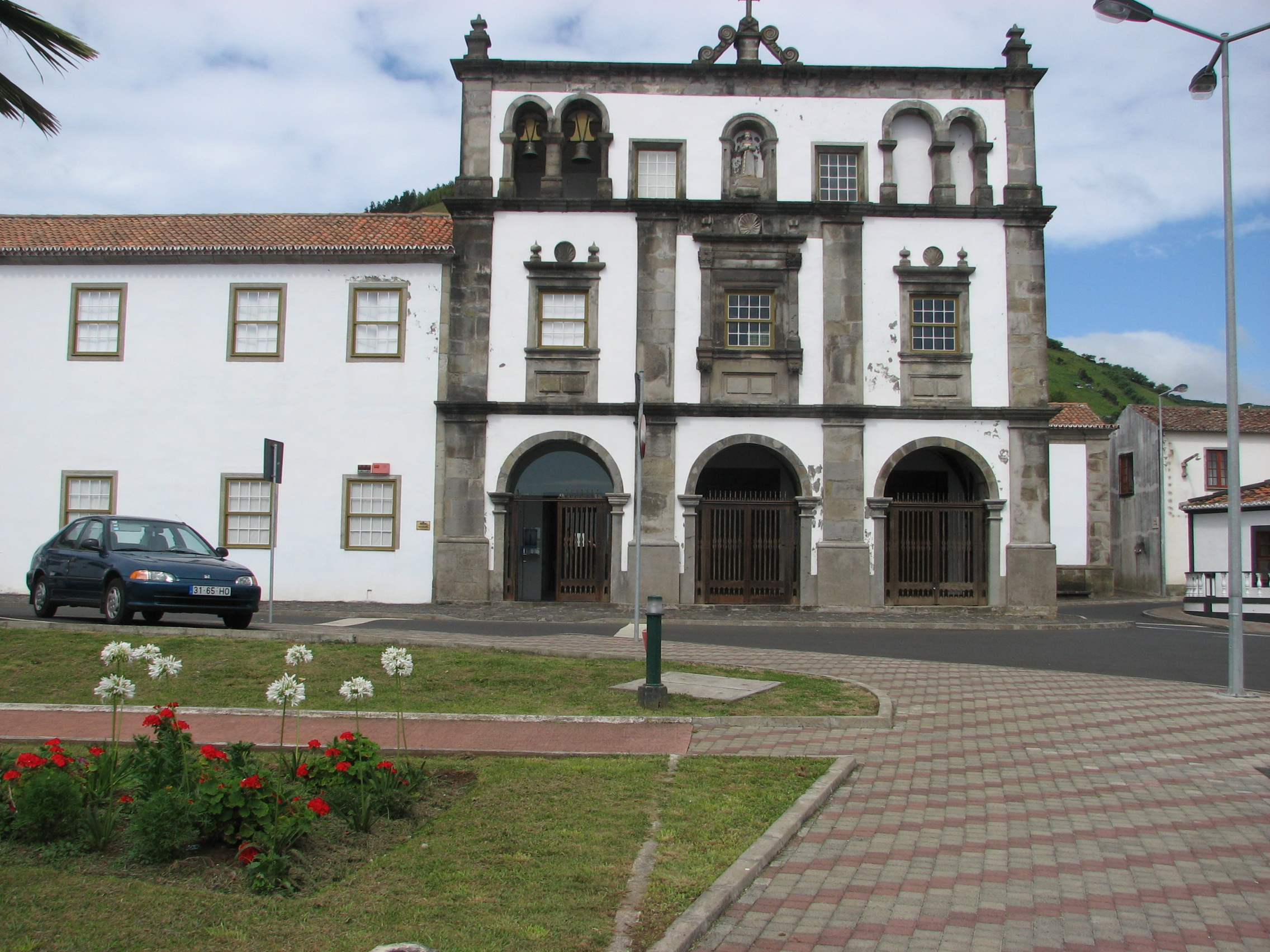
The multi-purpose Franciscan Convent of São Boaventura, utilized by the citizens as church, school and hospital. The Flores Museum is now located here as well.

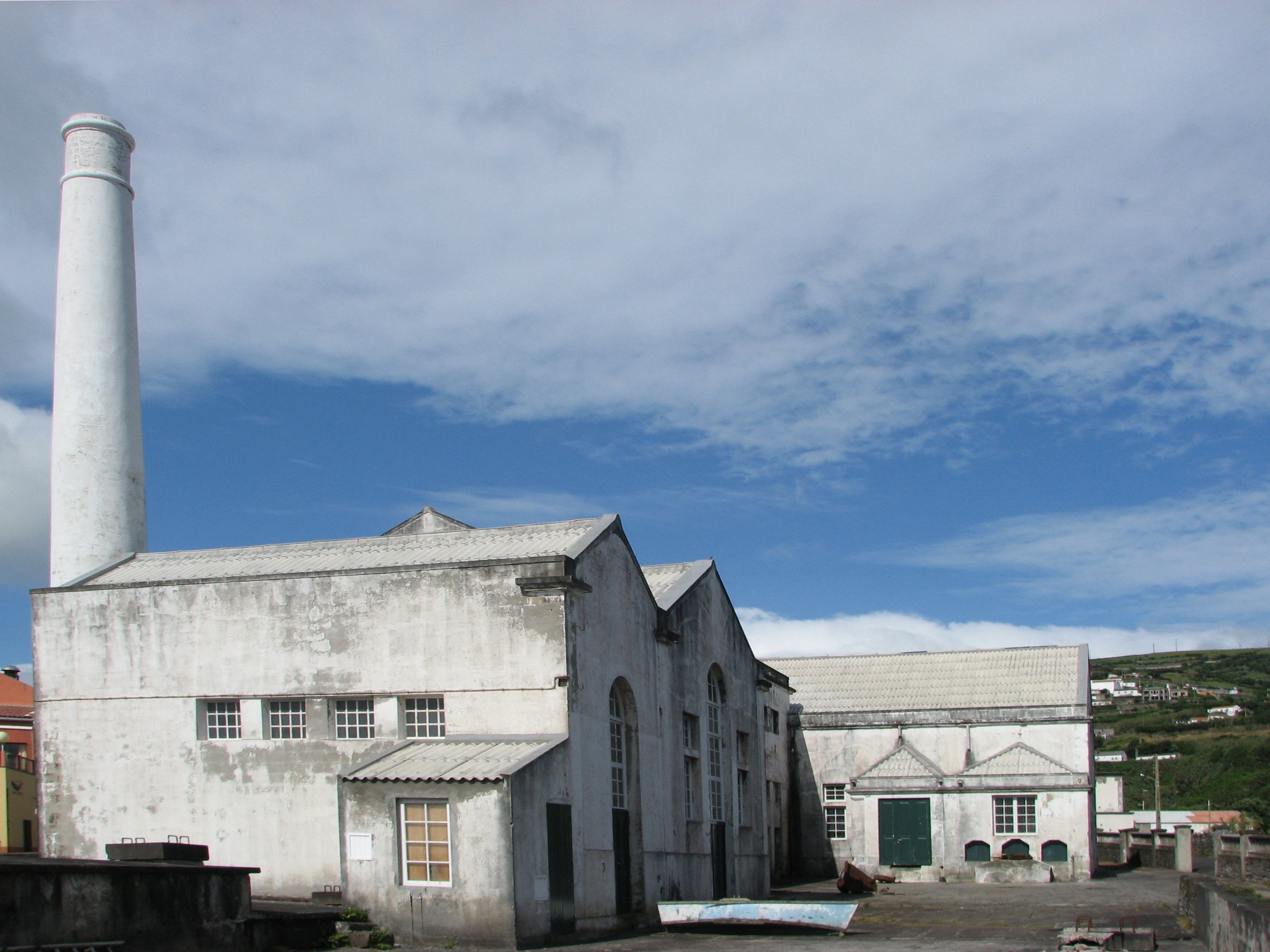
Antique Whaling Station. Now a whaling museum.

The first attempts to settle Flores occurred in the area of Caveira where Willem van der Haegen and his supporters disembarked looking for the mythical Ilhas Cassitérides. After these colonists abandoned their settlement new pioneers in 1508 and 1510 attempted to succeed in the area of the present Santa Cruz.

This settlement was helped by the installation of the Franciscan Convent (São Boaventura), now a museum. Its construction began in 1642, two years after Portugal's Restoration of Independence, under the initiative of local Florense Father Inácio Coelho. The convent was renowned for its Baroque alter-pieces and its ornamented roof (constructed from local cedros-do-mato, typical of the region).

The Franciscans had a profound effect on the local population, installing the annual celebrations for the Culto do Divino Espírito Santo (Cult of the Holy Spirit), and becoming responsible for the education of the local community. Offering many courses, including Latin, it was their system that became the basis for the reforms in the post-Pomboline national educational system. But, after lasting briefly, those educators abandoned the island and the Franciscans returned to their place in São Boaventura. During the early transition between Franciscan and public systems, Father José António Camões, was important in his functions (between 1797 and 1807) exercising his role as the only grammar teacher on the island. He returned to this place in 1815, where he continued until 1827 in this capacity. Santa Cruz remained the only educational centre in the Western Group of Azorean islands, until the middle of the 19th century; it consolidated its position, forcing the local population to send their children to live in the regional capital in order to obtain an education. The convent, whose chief benefactor was Father Maurício António de Freitas, promoter of the religious foundation Externato da Imaculada Conceição, was also the primary establishment to provide post-secondary education after the fall of the religious orders. The nucleus of post-secondary education began in October 1959, in the home of the poet Roberto de Mesquita, until it was moved, much later, to the Convent of São Boaventura where it was transformed into a public institution.

The convent also became the home of the local hospital (now medical centre) for the island, founded in 1878, on the initiative of António Vicente Peixoto Pimentel (1827–1881). The hospital occupied the Convent, after the Pombolino expulsion of the religious orders (in 1834), which was at the time owned by Francisco da Cruz Silva e Reis. It was purchased in 1877 by the Santa Casa da Misericórdia de Santa Cruz das Flores as a formal hospital and children's shelter. After a campaign, spearheaded by Peixoto Pimentel, part of the convent was demolished and an extension remodeled to serve the hospital, which was re-inaugurated in 1881, the same year that its founder died. Until the 1940s the convent operated in this capacity, where it was closed until 1945 due to a lack of modern conditions. Part of the convent was demolished, and a new building built after the establishment of the French Communications Base. Apart from local doctors, French military doctors brought new equipment, forms of treatment and conditions that allowed the hospital to boast its eminence in the Azores, even realizing complex surgeries not available on the other islands.

The construction of the Matriz Church of Nossa Senhora da Conceição (English: Our Lady of Conception) began in the close years of the 18th century, after one attempt was impeded by a strong rock deposit near the Praça do Município (now the Praça Marquês do Pombal). Construction ended in 1859, after many years of difficult financial constraints and unexpected difficulties in its construction.

During the second half of the 19th century, the whaling industry was an important part of the island's economy. After a few years of traditional whale-hunting the industrialization of the activity was formalized with construction of factory, and whale oil and products were concentrated in the area of Boqueirão. The Fábrica da Baleia do Boqueirão (Whale Factory of Boqueirão), now a part of the Flores Museum, occupies an advantageous place in the area around the port of Boqueirão, with a ramp adapted to drag sperm whales from the ocean. Its architect of this business was the Lisbon entrepreneur Francisco Marcelino dos Reis and directed by his partner José Jacinto Mendonça Flores, who was the local investor of Reis & Flores, provisioner to whaling fleets. Construction began in October 1941, and the machinery installed by March 1943. It is likely that the factory began operations in the summer of 1944, probably in the month of July. It continued to operate until 1976. After a couple of tentative attempts to restart operations, it was finally closed in 1981. At its peak (1963) the factory processed 103 whales. The final animal was processed on November 24, 1981, after José Jacinto Mendonça Furtado harpooned the 21st whale of the season.

Of the many stories of ships being sunk in the waters of Flores, owing to its rocky coastal shores, there is the strange story of the whaler Modena, from the port of Boston which foundered in the waters of Bermuda on April 22. Captain William H. Long and eleven men, after abandoning their ship, survived an adventure of 2,000 nautical miles (3,700 km) along the Gulf Stream to the mouth of Ribeira da Cruz, in Fajã do Conde. In this area, the sailors carved on the rocks: "Capt. W. H. Lang and 11 men landed May 5, 1873 from Bark Modena of Boston Mass. Foundered April 22".

== Geography ==
The villa of Santa Cruz, home of the municipal seat, is an urbanized area that includes the historical center, Fazenda d'Alem, Monte, Vales and Ribeira dos Barqueiros. The core is the urbanized area extends from the eastern coast (to include the airport) and inland. Along the coast two small ports condition exports and traffic: the Porto das Poças (in the south), used by commercial fishermen and for traffic to Corvo, and the Porto do Boqueirão (in the north), an older whaling station whose ramp and factory (Fábrica da Baleia do Boqueirão) have become part of the Museum of Flores. In the extreme north of the parish is the small port of São Pedro, linked to the northern limit of the airport's runway.

Due to its central place and the existence of the French Base, historically, Santa Cruz has not experienced the same level of emigration that occurred in other Florense communities during the 20th century. In settlements around the island, the number of inhabitants were halved during this period, while Santa Cruz maintained its population; in 1940, 2,100 people lived in the urbanized area, today about 2,000 people are residents of the parish.

=== Ecoregions/Protected areas ===
- Reserva Florestal de Recreio Luís Paulo Camacho (Recreational Forest Reserve Luís Paulo Camacho) - this bio-reserve includes a nearby dam, and park responsible for Trout aquaculture, destined for the rivers of the island, as well as a botanical park with a rich and diverse collection of endemic and exotic plant species;
- Miradouro da Monte das Cruzes - overlooking the villa, it provides a panorama that includes the villa, the zone of Barqueiros and the Vales plain, with its homes aligned along the river-valley;
- Miradouro da Cruzinha das Almas - located as one enters the valley of Fazenda de Santa Cruz, and where the visitor may see the cliffs and islets in Alagoa Bay;

== Economy ==
Owing to being the principal population center and home of the majority of administrative/economic services on the island, it is today a modern center concentrating on the tertiary sector. In addition, hotel and other services, the fishery, automobile repair, civil construction, commerce and restaurant businesses are equal contributors to the local economy.

But, because of the rich pasture-lands in the interior, the agricultural sector (dairy products and cattle raising) remain an important part of the economy. The export of butter to Lisbon, was an important part in the villa's development and industrial competition, that resulted in the creation of several small cooperatives on the island. The development of these agricultural syndicates, led by Father José Furtado Mota, was one of the important socio-economic movements in the Azores during the 20th century. This resulted in several conflicts, known on the island colloquially as the "Butter Wars". The growth in the dairy industry contributed to the decrease in other forms of agriculture, particularly cereals, since lands used for dairy-raising were more lucrative.

== Architecture ==
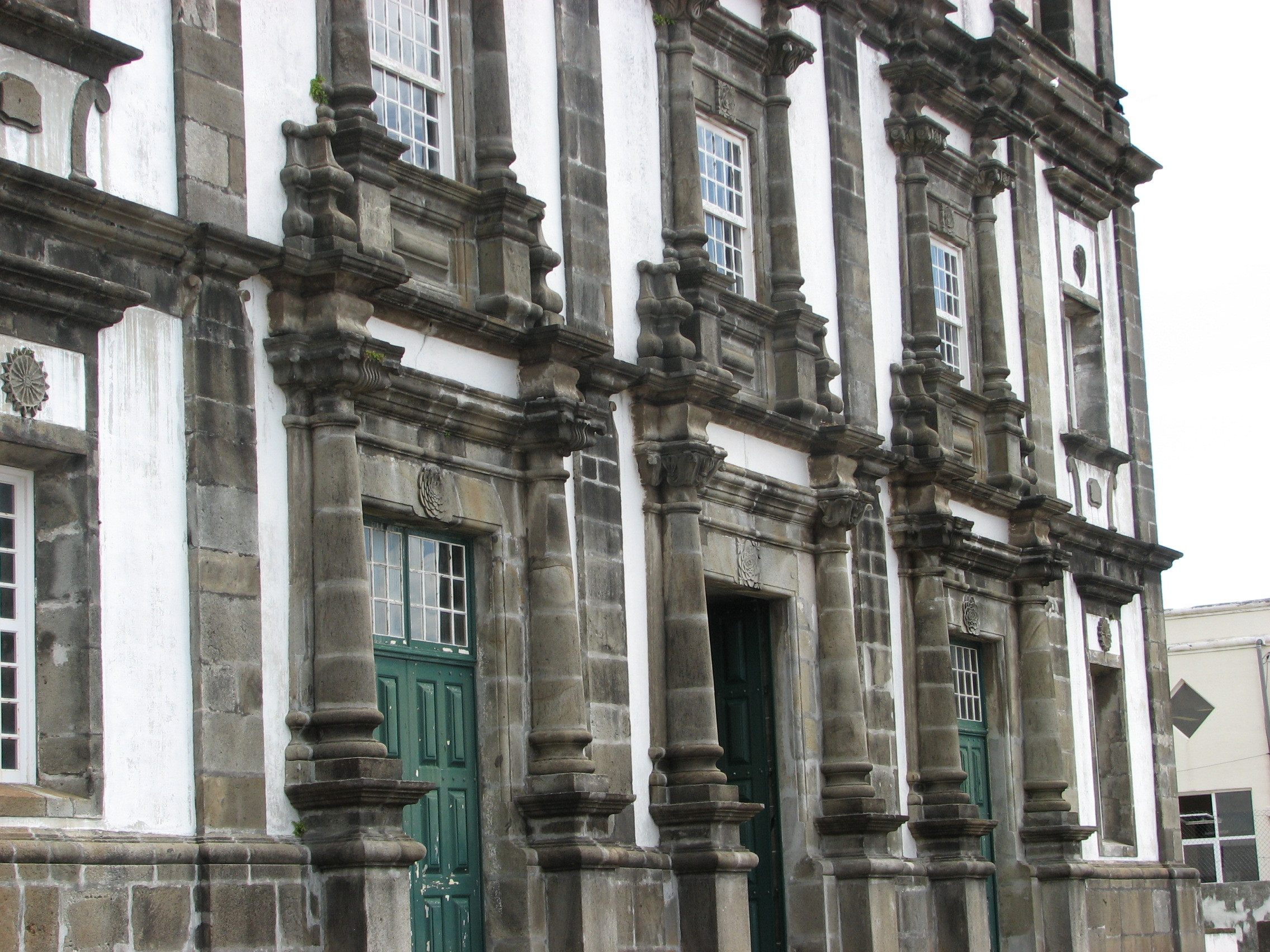
Front facade of the parochial Church of Nossa Senhora da Conceição

=== Civil ===
- Museum-Residence of Pimentel de Mesquita Portuguese: Casa-Museu Pimentel de Mesquita), currently adapted to house the local public library, the Casa Pimental de Mesquita was the historical home of one of the leading figures in the community;
- Whale Factory of Boqueirão (Portuguese: Fábrica da Baleia do Boqueirão), the whaling station, factory and boat ramp that was once one of the major industries on the islands, and now part of the Museum of Flores;

=== Religious ===
- Church of Nossa Senhora da Conceição (Portuguese: Igreja da Nossa Senhora da Conceição/Igreja Parochial da Santa Cruz), the parochial church and classified as a building of significant public interest;
- Church of Nossa Senhora de Lourdes (Portuguese: Igreja da Nossa Senhora de Lourdes), located in the locality of Fazenda de Santa Cruz;
- Convent of São Boaventura (Portuguese: Convento do São Boaventura), an old Franciscan Convent, and Church, and part of the Museum of Flores complex;
- Império of the Divine Holy Spirit of Vila (Portuguese: Casa do Espírito Santo da Vila), constructed in 1854, Casa da Rua da Aresta (constructed in 1865, and later rebuilt in 1888), Casa da Ribeira dos Barqueiros (constructed in 1873) and Casa do Monte (constructed in 1910), all examples of the historical Impérios dedicated to the Holy Spirit, and where religious celebrations that occur annually.

== Culture ==
Largely a dynamic contribution to the society, the Sociedade Filarmónica Dr. Armas da Silveira, initially designated the União Musical Florentina is an example of local culture. Founded in 1915 by the medic José Jacinto Armas da Silveira, it was continued following its founder's death (1924) to perform music during secular and religious events.
