= Diogo das Chagas =

Portuguese Franciscan friar and historian

Diogo das Chagas, O.F.M.
- Born: c. 1584; Santa Cruz, Flores, Azores, Kingdom of Portugal
- Died: 1661 (aged 76–77); Angra do Heroísmo, Terceira, Azores, Kingdom of Portugal
- Citizenship: Portuguese
- Education: University of Coimbra
- Occupations: Franciscan friar, Catholic priest and historian
- Relatives: Mateus Coelho da Costa (father); Catarina de Fraga Rodovalho (mother)
- Writing career
- Language: Portuguese
- Period: 1696-1717
- Genres: History, Geography, Ethnography
- Subjects: Azores, theology, philosophy
- Notable works: Espelho Cristalino em Jardim de Várias Flores (1654); Relação do que aconteceu na Cidade de Angra da ilha Terceira, depois da feliz aclamação d'el rei D. João IV, que Deus guarde, na restauração do Castelo de S. João Baptista do Monte Brasil, até se embarcarem os castelhanos que o ocupavam... Fundação da Província de São João Evangelista das Ilhas dos Açores (lost); Meditação da luta do Diabo com Adam, pelo qual saiu Cristo Senhor Nosso a lutar com o Diabo; Consolação da pobreza, e remédio para qualquer muito muito pobre, ser muito rico De como se busca e acha a bem-aventurança

Diogo das Chagas, O.F.M. (Diogo of the Holy Wounds); (c. 1584 in Santa Cruz das Flores – c. 1661 in Angra do Heroísmo) was a Portuguese Franciscan friar and historian. He is best known as the author of Espelho Cristalino em Jardim de Várias Flores, an important resource on the colonization of the islands of the central and western groups of the Portuguese archipelago of his native region of the Azores after 1640.

== Biography ==
Diogo was the son of Mateus Coelho da Costa, Captain-major of the island of Flores, and his wife, Catarina de Fraga Rodovalho.

Little is known of his infancy and childhood; Diogo wrote that his first studies occurred in the city of Angra, where he most likely entered the Friars Minor and received his initial ecclesiastical training. Due to the absence of a resident bishop in the Diocese de Angra, he travelled to Lisbon in 1612 in order to be ordained a priest. He returned to the Azores in 1614, and began studying the Arts at the Jesuit college in Angra. In 1616 he returned to the mainland where he registered at the University of Coimbra to continue his theological studies. He completed these studies in 1620 and again returned to the Azores, where he taught theology at the Friary of São Francisco in Angra.

Diogo became the Guardian of the Friary of São Francisco in Praia da Vitoria on the island of Terceira in 1627, where he received a license to preach in 1629. Along with his brother, Friar Mateus da Conceição (Matthew of the Immaculate Conception), he was responsible for convincing the Franciscan superiors to remove the Azores from the Province of the Algarve, headquartered on the mainland, and be established as their own independent province in 1638. It was only after the acclamation by King John IV of Portugal in 1641 that the Province of St. John the Baptist of the Azores was established.

A friend of Captain-major Francisco de Ornelas da Câmara, Diogo was a vocal supporter of the Siege of São Filipe during the Portuguese Restoration War (27 March 1641 - 4 March 1642), which was responsible for the surrender of the Spanish garrison at the Fort of São João Baptista in Terceira.

In 1646, Diogo was appointed Vicar Provincial for the Azores, a position he would hold until 1649. During his time in the role, he traveled successively throughout the archipelago, in order to meet with the friars scattered across the different islands. He was considered the most dignified Father in 1655, at the time that new provincial elections were held.

Diogo died in 1661 at the Franciscan friary in Angra do Heroísmo.

== Published works ==
- Espelho Cristalino em Jardim de Várias Flores (c. 1646 - c. 1654)
- Relação do que aconteceu na Cidade de Angra da ilha Terceira, depois da feliz aclamação d'el rei D. João IV, que Deus guarde, na restauração do Castelo de S. João Baptista do Monte Brasil, até se embarcarem os castelhanos que o ocupavam…
- Fundação da Província de São João Evangelista das Ilhas dos Açores (lost)
- Meditação da luta do Diabo com Adam, pelo qual saiu Cristo Senhor Nosso a lutar com o Diabo
- Consolação da pobreza, e remédio para qualquer muito muito pobre, ser muito rico
- De como se busca e acha a bem-aventurança
