= António Cordeiro =

Portuguese Jesuit priest and historian (1641–1722)

- Born: c. 1641; Angra do Heroísmo (Azores), Kingdom of Portugal
- Died: 2 February 1722; Lisbon, Kingdom of Portugal
- Education: University of Coimbra
- Occupation: Priest
- Relatives: António Cordeiro Moitoso (father); Maria Espinosa (mother)
- Writing career
- Language: Portuguese
- Period: 1696–1717
- Genres: History, geography, ethnography
- Subjects: Azores, theology, philosophy
- Notable works: Moral Teológica (1696); Cursus Philosophicus Conimbricensis (1714); In Proecipium Partium D. Thomae Theologia Scholastica (1716); História Insulana das Ilhas a Portugal Sujeitas no Oceano Ocidental (1717)

António Cordeiro (c. 1641 – 2 February 1722) was a Portuguese Catholic priest in the Society of Jesus and historian. He was the author of the classical chronicle História Insulana, and first to publish a public opinion on the form of governance for the archipelago of the Azores.

== Biography ==
Cordeiro was born in c. 1641 in Angra do Heroísmo. He was the sixth and final child of António Cordeiro Moitoso and his Graciosense wife Maria Espinosa.

His primary studies, and classes in the humanities, occurred in the city of Angra do Heroísmo, and he showed an exceptional intellect. Although he was their youngest child, his parents decided to send him to study at the University of Coimbra, where one of his brothers already studied.

In 1656, with less than 15 years of age, he departed for Lisbon on board a warship in a flotilla commanded by General António Teles de Menezes. On reaching the Portuguese coast, the armada was forced into combat against a Spanish squadron, where he and his brother, Pedro Cordeiro de Espinosa (Note: Pedro Cordeiro de Espinosa would become a canonical Doctor, professor and later dean at the University of Coimbra, and commissioner in the Captaincy of Bahia, in Brazil.) were taken prisoners. Seventeen days later the enemy brig came under attack from an English ship, and the Spanish captain was forced to retreat to Cádiz for repairs. While in Cádiz, young António attempted to escape, but was caught. Aside from being physically punished, he was brought before the supreme commander of Spanish forces, the Duke of Medinaceli, who was impressed by his brilliant oratory, and granted him safe passage to Portugal.

But, his problems did not end when he returned to Portugal: on crossing the Algarve he was confronted with an outbreak of plague, and upon arriving in Setúbal, he was detained and placed in quarantine.

=== Education ===
He finally arrived in Coimbra, and began his studies, where he studied philosophy in the Colégio of the Society of Jesus, where he was an exceptional student. He completed his course on 12 June 1657, and joined the Society, and shortly after, entered training to become a Canon at the University of Coimbra. He completed his university studies in 1676, beginning immediately his career as Master of the Society of Jesus, and professor at Coimbra.

=== Canon ===
Between 1676 and 1680 he taught philosophy, and until 1696 he taught scholastic and moral theology. In 1696, he was transferred to Braga, where he was professor at the Colégio da Companhia (College of the Society of Jesus), another branch of the Society. From Braga he went to the Colégio in Porto, where he remained for eight years, until he was assigned to the Colégio de Santo Antão (College of Santo Antão), in Lisbon, where he remained until his death.

In addition to his work as professor in the Society of Jesus, he was a renowned orator, who traveled between dioceses in catechism missions and introducing reforms organized by the Jesuits; he was a regular on the "circuit" between Braga, Viseu, Pinhel, Torres Novas and other places.

He also collaborated with the University of Évora, and other colégios of the Society, winning fame for his great intellect. D. José de Barbosa, on the publication of Cordeiro's História Insulana affirmed:

"...he was a ray that proceeded that of the Sun...illuminating, with his doctrine, the Universities of Coimbra and Évora, the studies of Braga, Lisbon and Porto, and, not content to reveal the science with subtle novelty, began a life of an apostle on the fervent missions to Viseu, Pinhel, Torres Novas and many other settlements, who even today...look to documents of his piety."

=== História Insulana ===
He dedicated himself to the history of the Azores, aided by the manuscripts of Gaspar Frutuoso, which were held in the possession of the Society of Jesus. From consulting Frutuoso's works he began to write his História Insulana, that described the history of the Azores. It was the first work to be edited, and published: it became a fundamental text on Azorean history, even as Frutuoso's Saudades da Terra was inaccessible and parts uncompleted until the end of the 20th Century. For those reasons, the Insulana constituted the most complete resource that indirectly accessed Frutuoso's work.

Father António Cordeiro died in the Colégio de Santo Antão, in Lisbon, on 2 February 1722.

== Published works ==
Although he was known to be a prolific author, his most remembered works were the following:

- Moral Teológica (1696)
- Cursus Philosophicus Conimbricensis (1714)
- In Proecipium Partium D. Thomae Theologia Scholastica (1716)
- História Insulana das Ilhas a Portugal Sujeitas no Oceano Ocidental (1717)
