= Cascata do Poço do Bacalhau =

Waterfall on Azores, Portugal

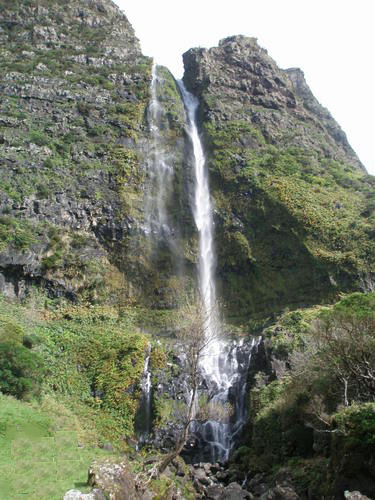
- The Cascata do Poço do Bacalhau in 2007
- Interactive map of Cascata do Poço do Bacalhau
- Location: Flores, Azores, Portugal
- Coordinates: 39°27′31″N 31°15′22″W
- Total height: 90 metres (300 ft)

The Cascata do Poço do Bacalhau (lit. 'Cod Pool Waterfall' in Portuguese) is a natural waterfall on the island of Flores, a constituent part of the Azores, Portugal. It is located within the boundaries of the civil parish of Fajã Grande, which is part of the municipality of Lajes das Flores. It falls from a height of about 90 metres (300 ft) into a pool below. It is a popular stop for tourists hiking in the surrounding area.

== Etymology ==
Cascata do Poço do Bacalhau means "Cod Pool Waterfall" in the Portuguese language. There are numerous local stories and theories about the origin of the name, but the most popular one is that the name is a reference to a cod-shaped rock that the waterfall hits in the pool below.

== Geography ==
The Cascata do Poço do Bacalhau is located in the civil parish of Fajã Grande, in the municipality of Lajes das Flores, on Flores Island, a constituent part of the Portuguese archipelago of the Azores. It is on the trail between the main town of Fajã Grande and the Ponta da Fajã hiking area. The waterfall is 90 metres (300 ft) high and descends to a small pool below, the Poço do Bacalhau (Cod Pool). The water in the natural pool is clear and suitable for swimming, making it a frequent destination for visitors to the island, particularly those who have finished the trek along the Trilho dos Lagos (Trail of the Lakes). The pool is surrounded by endemic vegetation, notably the Azores or Macaronesian laurel (Laurus azorica).

== Canyoning ==
Like most waterfalls on Flores, Cascata Poço do Bacalhau has been developed for canyoning. It is the final part of the "Casas inferior" route, which offers an advanced-level descent (rated a5a3V). The route spans 1.7 km, covers an elevation drop of 340 meters, and includes 12 rappels, with the highest reaching 60 meters. It should only be attempted under stable weather conditions. Located above this route is the "Casas superior" tour, which is 2.2 km long but significantly less popular.

== See also ==
- List of waterfalls
