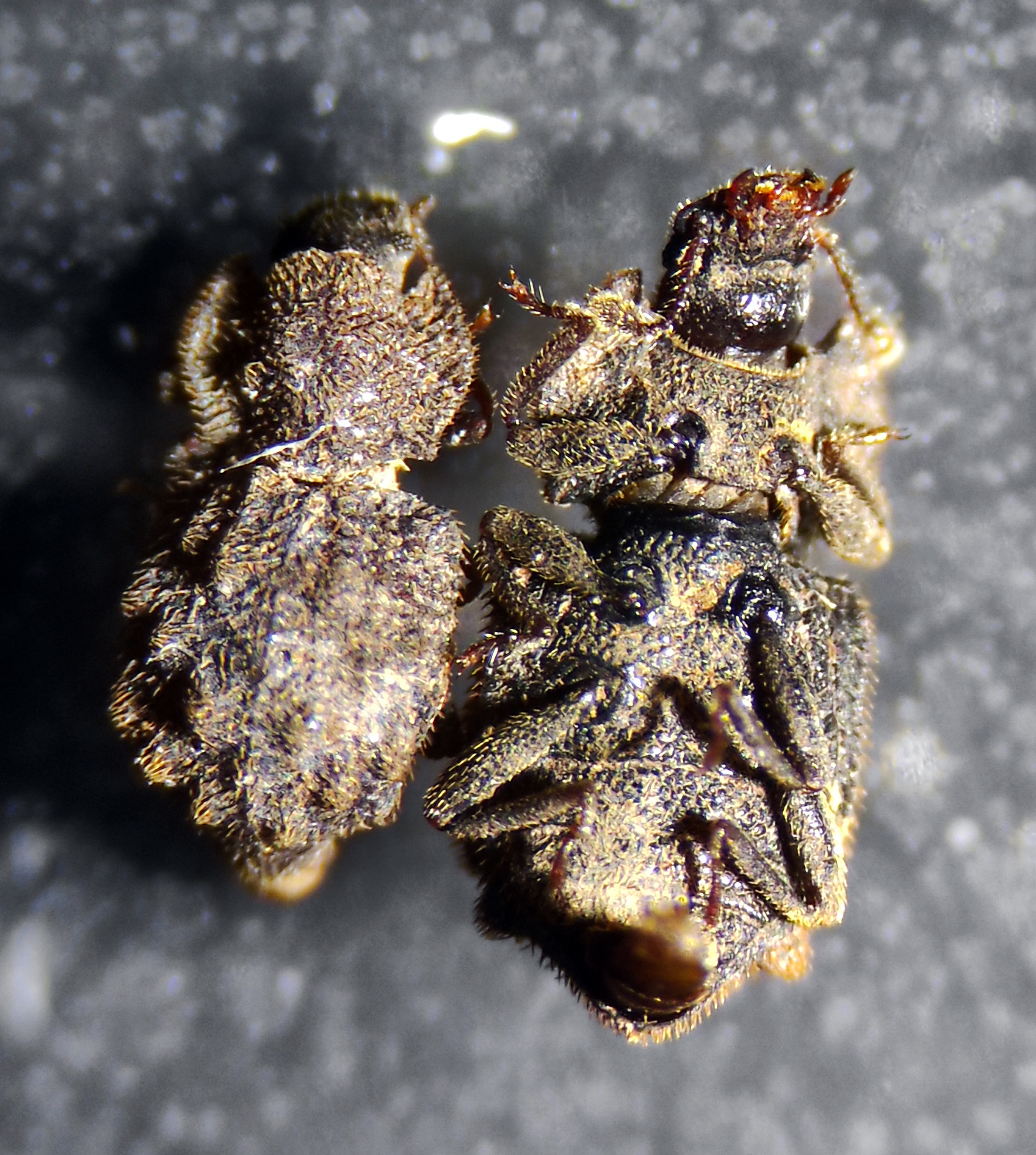
- Tarphius floresensis

Conservation status
- Critically Endangered (IUCN 3.1)

Scientific classification
- Kingdom: Animalia
- Phylum: Arthropoda
- Clade: Pancrustacea
- Class: Insecta
- Order: Coleoptera
- Suborder: Polyphaga
- Infraorder: Cucujiformia
- Family: Zopheridae
- Genus: Tarphius
- Species: T. floresensis

Binomial name
- Tarphius floresensis Borges & Serrano 2017

= Tarphius floresensis =

Species of beetle

Tarphius floresensis is a beetle species in the family Zopheridae endemic to Flores Island (Azores). It is commonly named as an iron-clad beetle in English or Escaravelho-cascudo-da-mata in Portuguese. The genus Tarphius is an evolutionarily ancient species particular to the Azores.

== Description and ecology ==
The average length of the beetle is less than half centimeters. It has small setae on its body, which makes the beetle to look "hairy". The general colour of the beetle is reddish or reddish-brown to dark brown. The dorsal part of the beetle is arcuate, while the dorsal surface is covered in dense rounded granules, each one with light setae on top. The beetle is incapable of flight.

The species can be found between 300 and 1000 m above sea level, often in wet places, such as slopes near rivers. The species mainly lives in soil, but can also be found under the bark of old trees. Interestingly, it has been found under both endemic and exotic trees. The beetle is present in some larger and well-preserved patches of native forests of the island. Tarphius is a Fungivorous beetle and is active at night.

== Distribution ==
Tarphius floresensis is endemic to Flores Island (Azores), Portugal. It has been found in Natural Forest Reserve of Morro Alto and Pico da Sé and Natural Forest Reserve of Caldeiras Funda and Rasa.

== Conservation status ==
Tarphius floresensis is considered as critically endangered species according to IUCN Red List. It is mostly threatened by habitat loss due to non-native invasive species and the change of land use. The most problematic invasive species reducing the habitats is Hedychium gardnerianum, which is introduced to the island as a decorative plant.

On the scope of a LIFE Programme (Life Beetles), efforts to raise awareness among locals about the beetle are being carried out through the following conservation actions

- Control of invasive flora species such as ginger lily (Hedychium gardnerianum), sweet pittosporum (Pittosporum undulatum) and earleaf nightshade (Solanum mauritianum) along the riverbed
- Application of Nature-based solutions (NBS) to control erosion, prevent natural hazards and creation of a favorable habitat for the project target species.
- Restoration of strategical habitat areas through the removal of Invasive species and by planting native species
- Promotion of habitat connectivity for the species.
