= Church of Nossa Senhora dos Remédios (Fajãzinha) =

- Church of Our Lady of Remedies
- Igreja de Nossa Senhora dos Remédios
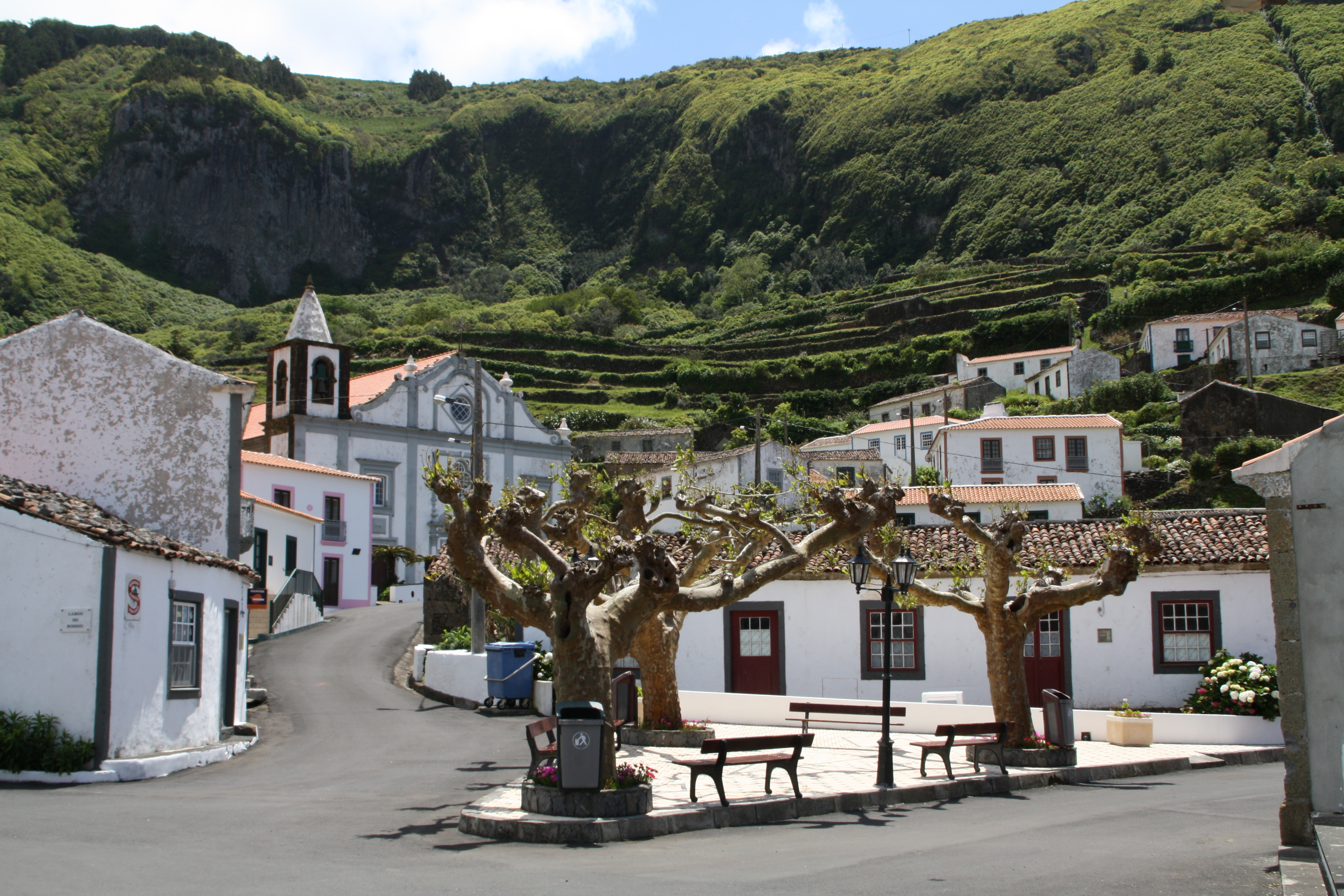
- The slightly off-centre facade of the parochial church, situated on an incline and implanted in the valley of Fajãzinha
- Church of Nossa Senhora dos Remédios
- 39°25′56.3″N 31°15′15.6″W
- Location: Flores, Western, Azores
- Country: Portugal
- Denomination: Roman Catholic

Architecture
- Style: Revivalist

Administration
- Diocese: Diocese of Angra

The Church of Nossa Senhora dos Remédios (Portuguese: Igreja Paroquial de Fajãzinha/Igreja de Nossa Senhora dos Remédios) is an 18th-century church located in the civil parish of Fajãzinha in the municipality of Lajes das Flores, in the Portuguese island of Flores, in the archipelago of the Azores.

== History ==
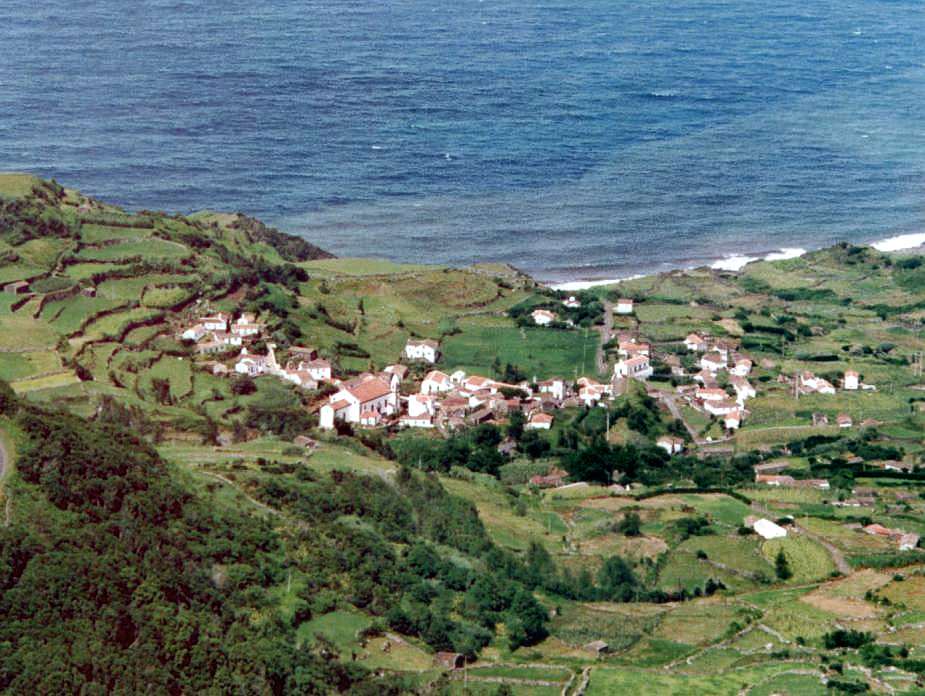
A view of the Fajãzinha valley with the church in the central village

The first reference to a church occurred in 1675, in the area known as Adro Velho immediately located near the actual church.

A provision by the Bishop of Angra friar D. Lourenço de Castro in 1676, de-annexed the parish of Fajãzinha from the parish of Lajes das Flores, to which the ecclesiastical parish belonged, as part of the greater parish of Nossa Senhora dos Remédios das Fajãs, with its seat in the Church of Nossa Senhora dos Remédios da Fajãzinha. Between 12 and 13 July, the new parish was delimited in the presence of the ecclesiastical Ouvidor, the Father Domingos Nunes Pereira and primary parish priest André Alves de Mendonça.

In 1747, a bell tower was constructed, dating from the inscription place on the church.

Stone was already being broken in 1771 for the construction of a new church. The construction of this church would only begin on 7 April 1776, with the sacristy (to the north) constructed in 1787. The belltower was remained incomplete for some time, gradually completed through the contributions of its parishioners. A date marker over the portico indicates the date of 1778, referring to its construction by Father Alexandre Pimentel de Mesquita. Finally, in the summer 1896, work began to conclude the bell tower, ultimately leading to its conclusion on 23 May 1834 (later followed in 1868 by work completed on the cemetery).

Between 1895 and 1898, the parish (along with all other parishes on the island) belonged to the integrated municipality of Santa Cruz das Flores, following the suppression of the municipality of Lajes das Flores.

== Architecture ==
The church is located in an area along the western coast, in the southeastern part of an open valley that leads to the sea, delimited in the northeast by the course of the Ribeira Grande ravine. The actual church is surrounded by buildings in an artificial platform formed by walled courtyard that sunk from the roadway.

The longitudinal plan consists of three naves and a presbytery, addorsed by a square bell tower, sacristy and annex, covered in tiled roof. The facades are plastered and painted in white with exposed pilastered cornerstones terminated in cornices. The principal facade includes three sections defined by pilasters and terminated in a gable, equally sectioned-off by lateral sections and crowned by pear-shaped pinnacles and Latin cross. Over the entrance is a circular and diamond-like oculus with trilobed frame. The main inscription interrupts the main facade, with the inscription:

EDIFICADA P.oR / P.e ALEXANDRE / PIMel DE MESqta. VI / GR.o DESTA IGR.a 1778
Built by / Father Alexandre / Pimentel de Mesquita VI / Built this Church in 1778

Each of the sections are marked by rectangular doors, with the central portico flanked by columns that support an entablature and frontispiece with interrupted scrolls, surmounted by the quadrilobed oculus, inserted within a rectangular frame connected to the flanking pilasters. The lateral doorways are surmounted by rectangular inscriptions and framed windows surmounted by cornices. To the left of the main structure is the belltower that includes a three-register structure, decorated with cornices dividing the belfry from the rest of the structure, that is crowned by octagonal rooftop. On the first registry of the tower is a marker with the inscription:

EDIFICADA / COM ESMOLAS / DOS DEVOTOS / 1898
Built / with alms / of the Devotees / 1898

The lateral facades are marked by framed doors and windows, with the sacristy having its own exterior access. Over the sacristy is the inscription:

IDFICADA / P.oR P.WG / SEB. ANT / DAS. 1787

In the rear of the building are two diamond-shaped oculi, corresponding to the tops of the lateral naves.

The interior naves are separated by five rounded-arches over rectangular pillars, with salient bases and capitals in granite. These naves are covered by wood ceilings and false vaults over granite cornices. The high choir, in wood, with balustrade overhangs the lower choir and interior baptistry, situated in the tower. In the third pillar opposite the epistle is a wooden pulpit, with rectangular basin over corbels (also in wood) that contort around the pillar with guardrail decorated in palms and crosses, surmounted by baldachin and reached by stone stairs, with guard of wooden balusters, skirting the pillar. At the front of the lateral naves are chapels under triumphal archways sheltering the retables in polychromatic and gilded woodwork, surmounted by oculi. The archways are surmounted by cornice with curvilinear angles, interconnect with the lateral cornice work.
