= Church of São José (Fajã Grande) =

- Church of St. Joseph
- Igreja de São José
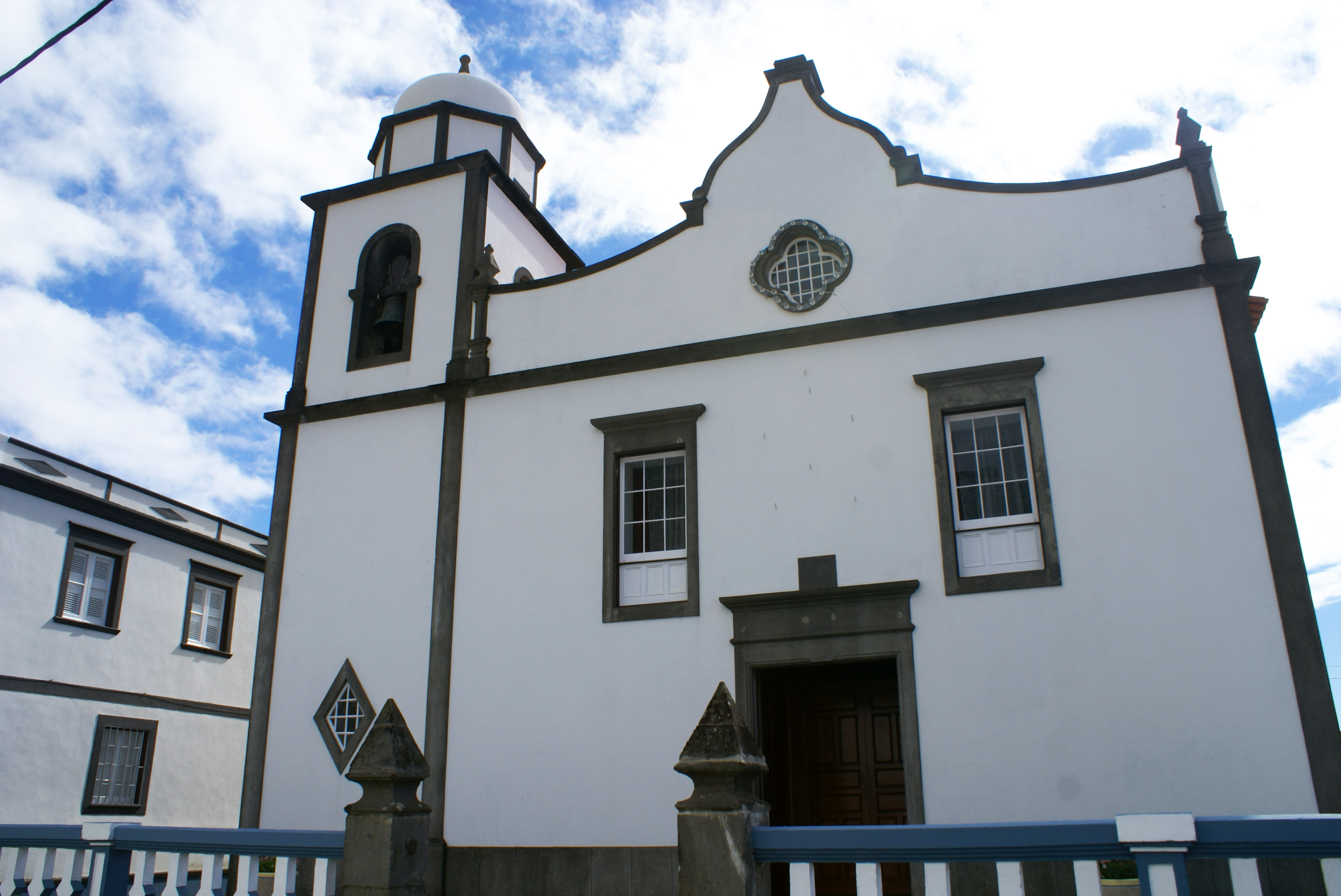
- The front facade of the church, identical to those of the region
- Church of São José
- 39°27′14.1″N 31°15′45.8″W
- Location: Flores, Western, Azores
- Country: Portugal
- Denomination: Roman Catholic

Architecture
- Style: Revivalist

Administration
- Diocese: Diocese of Angra

The Church of São José (Portuguese: Igreja Paroquial de Fajã Grande/Igreja de São José) is a 17th-century church located in the civil parish of Fajã Grande in the municipality of Lajes das Flores, in the Portuguese island of Flores, in the archipelago of the Azores.

== History ==
In July 1676, the ecclesiastical parish of Nossa Senhora do Remédios de Fajãzinha was instituted, that included several localities: Fajã Grande, Ponta, Caldeira and Mosteiro, by proviso of the Bishop of Angra, friar D. Lourenço de Castro.

In 1755, a chapel dedicated to São Jorge was constructed, that would eventually be the site of the actual church. The chapel was consecrated on 24 May 1757 and its burial occurred in January 1758.

In 1847, the chapel was expanded and concluded in 1849, with its consecration occurring on 1 August 1850.

On 28 November 1855, the Junta Geral do Distrito da Horta (District General Junta for Horta) complained to the government about the creation of the autonomous parish of Fajã Grande. A report by the Civil Governor Luís Teixeira de Sampaio (dated 3 April 1857), affirmed that the chapel of São Jorge was large enough to be constituted as its own parish; owing to its size and distance (a league) from Fajãzinha and separated by a running ravine, that in the winter cuts off completely the communication [between settlements]..., that it would be a great service to those people that a separate faith community be established. Legend suggests that, on those days when the Ribeira Grande ravine overflowed its banks, impeding passage to Fajãzinha, the local parishioners congregated at what became known as the Pedra da Missa (Mass Stone). Located on the right bank of the ravine, the parishioners would face the church of Fajãzinha, which they could see, praying during the liturgical mass, and dispersing when the locals ended their service. On 2 December, the General Junta (once again) protested to the central government that the settlement should not be de-annexed. But, on 4 April 1861, King D. Pedro V authorized the creation of the new parish, to be constituted by the localities of Ponta, Fajã Grande and Cuada, with its seat in the church of São José da Fajã Grande. On 20 June, a charter was issued by Bishop of Angra, friar Estêvão de Jesus Maria elevated the parish, separate it from the established Nossa Senhora do Remédios de Fajãzinha.

In 1880 there were public works associated with the interventions by a Fajãgrandense emigre, José Luís da Silveira, who had moved to the United States.

== Architecture ==
The triumphal arch is flanked by two collateral retables.
