= Cascata da Ribeira Grande =

Waterfall in the Azores, Portugal

Cascata da Ribeira Grande is a waterfall in Fajãzinha in the Azores of Portugal. It is described as a "towering jet of water that divides into smaller waterfalls before collecting in a still pool".

== See also ==
- List of waterfalls

== See also ==
The 6 Best Azores Waterfalls on QuestTraveAdventures
