= Morro Alto =

Mountain in Portugal

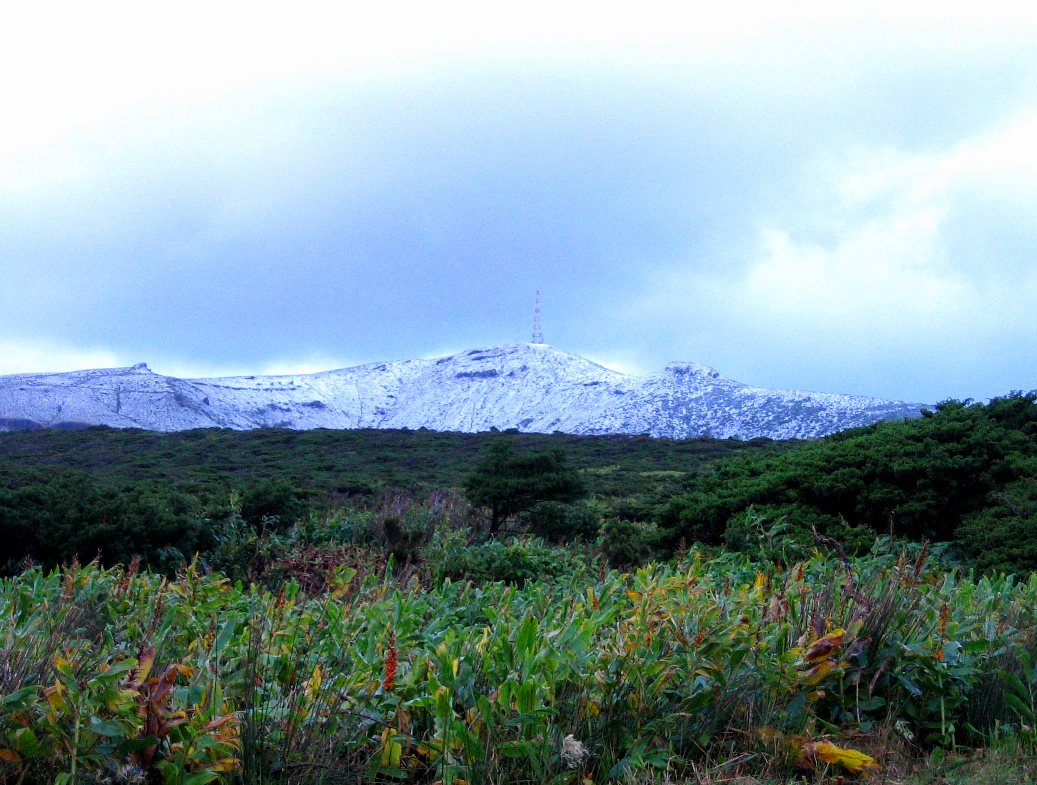
- View of the snow-covered Morro Alto, Flores Island, Azores

Highest point
- Elevation: 915 m (3,002 ft)
- Prominence: 915 m (3,002 ft)
- Coordinates: 39°28′N 31°13′W

Geography
- Location: Flores, Azores, Portugal

Geology
- Mountain type: Stratovolcano
- Last eruption: 950 BC ± 100 years

Morro Alto is the highest mountain of Flores, Azores, Portugal. It is part of a trachytic process represented by the Pico da Sé, forming an imposing volcanic apparatus embedded between two deep erosion valleys, product of the Badanela and Fazenda rivers.

The humid Atlantic climate acts as an ecological modeler creating the “foggy zone” with very strong winds and high rainfall, promoting the appearance of peat bogs, where the Azores juniper predominates, which gives this high zone a peculiar and distinctive appearance from the rest of the island. The viewpoint located there is at a high altitude and looks out from Morro Alto over a landscape of endemic vegetation quite varied, with extensive massifs of laurisilva forests characteristic of Macaronesia and is therefore a classified place of protected landscape. The altitude allows a comprehensive view of much of the island of Flores and the surrounding sea.

Currently part of the Special Conservation Zone of the Central Zone-Morro Alto. Nearby are Pico da Burrinha, Testa da Igreja and Pico dos Sete. On the plateaus that surround it, on the side of Fajã Grande, Pontas Brancas, Burrinha, Água Branca and Rochão Grande. Beside the Funda, Comprida, Seca and Água Branca lagoons and the meandering of Ribeira Grande and many other waterways.

== History ==
Formerly Morro Alto was an obligatory passage for anyone traveling from Fajã Grande to Cedros. In the same way, shepherds from Fajã, who on the day of Fio, traveled through Burrinha and Água Branca to collect the sheep scattered in those distant places.
