= Fajãzinha =

- Civil parish
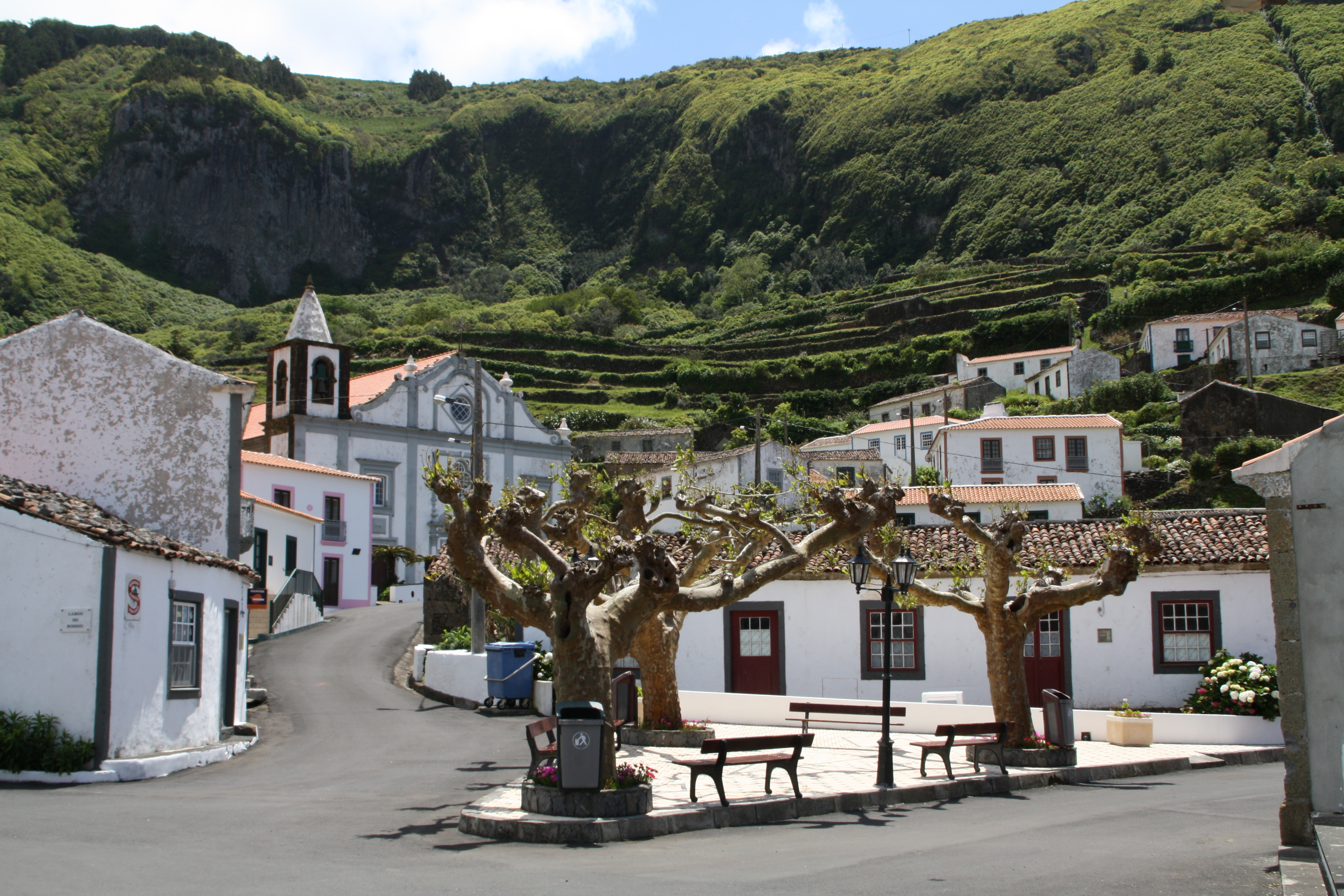
- The central square of Fajãzinha, with the Church of Nossa Senhora dos Remédios along the roadway, and the Ladeira do Picado in the background

- Location in the Azores Fajãzinha (Flores Island (Azores))
- Coordinates: 39°26′1″N 31°15′9″W
- Country: Portugal
- Auton. region: Azores
- Island: Flores
- Municipality: Lajes das Flores
- Established: Parish: July 1676; Civil parish: 28 November 1684

Area
  - Total: 6.16 km^{2} (2.38 sq mi)
- Elevation: 90 m (300 ft)

Population (2021)
  - Total: 71
  - Density: 12/km^{2} (30/sq mi)
- Time zone: UTC−01:00 (AZOT)
  - Summer (DST): UTC+00:00 (AZOST)
- Postal code: 9960-440
- Area code: 292
- Patron: Nossa Senhora dos Remédios
- Website: www.cmlajesflores.com

Fajãzinha (pronounced [fa.ʒɐ̃.ˈzi.ɲɐ]) is a civil parish in the municipality of Lajes das Flores located 15 kilometres (9.3 mi) from the main town of Lajes das Flores, on the western coast of Portuguese island of Flores. The population in 2021 was 71, in an area of 6.16 square kilometres (2.38 mi^{2}). It contains the localities Fajãzinha and Ladeiras.

== History ==
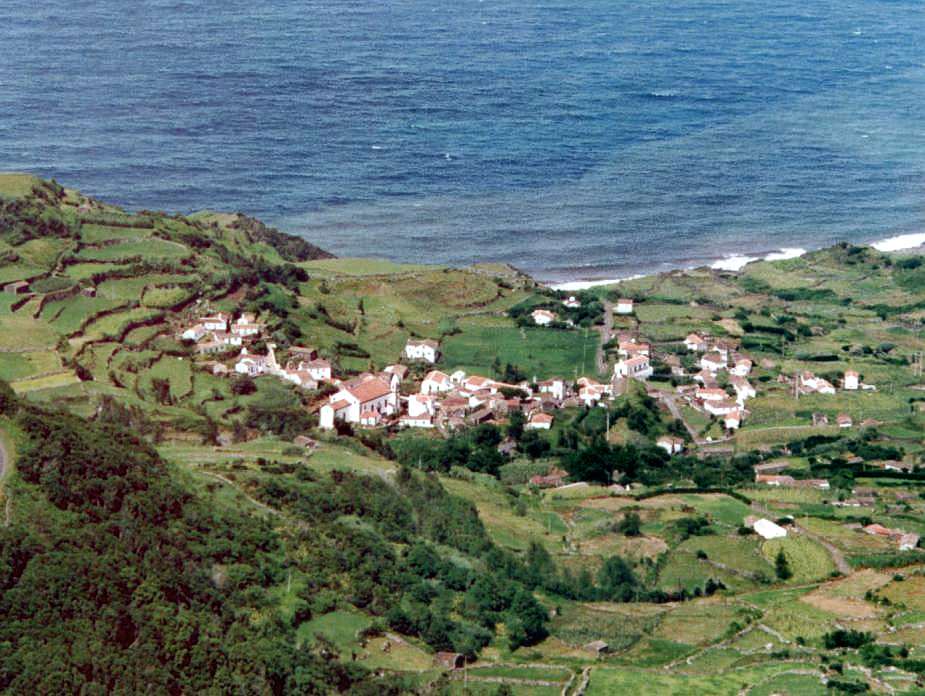
A view of Fajãzinha from the central plateau and Ribeira Grande

The western coast was explored during the middle of the 16th century, with the first stable settlements appearing in the beginning of the following century. These first colonists were captained by João Soares, native of São Miguel, who settled in the area of Lajedo.

Fajãzinha was de-annexed from Lajes das Flores in July 1676, by provision of the bishop of Angra, friar D. Lourenço de Castro. The parish of Nossa Senhora dos Remédios das Fajãs was established, with a jurisdiction that included the western coast from Ponta da Fajã until Mosteiro. It is the fourth oldest religious parish on the island.

One of the first stories from Fajãzinha was in 1789, by a judge, José Gonçalves da Silva, who referred to the construction of a stone bridge over the Ribeira Grande. It was a formidable construction for the era. It became historically referred to as a ponte da má memória (the bridge of bad memories); as Father António Camões would relate:

[There was a flood in 1794] that did not just destroy the bridge, but not as much as a small vestige, no remains, it disappeared from the rivers course, disappearing into the sea, leaving a large sandy debris field to a distance of 300 braças [660 metres, 2,170 ft], with unmeasurable loss for the farmers who had lands along the river's banks, and whom to the sea lost all.

Administratively, Fajãzinha has always been an administrative division of Lajes das Flores. Between 1895 and 1898, it was de-annexed from Lajes and incorporated into the neighbouring municipality of Santa Cruz das Flores. Since 1616 it was the religious center of the parish of the Fajãs, a Catholic organ whose principal patron was Nossa Senhora dos Remédios, that included Ponta, Fajã Grande, Caldeira and Mosteiro. But by 1850, Mosteiro and Caldeira become their own parishes, and in 1861, Fajã Grande and Ponta Delgada das Flores, received the same privilege.

=== 20th century ===
On 3 December 2010, around 5:00 am, following 72 consecutive hours of rain, a mudslide hit the town, causing severe destruction. During the event, homes were inundated, while cars and property were dragged away by a river of mud, water, vegetation and refuse from the village. At about 11:50 a.m., as the showers dissipated, the extent of the damage was made evident: the junta de freguesia (Portuguese: parish offices), main access to the hamlet, and electricity were cut off (although EDA, the local utility, was able to put the village on generators quickly). As some villagers congregated in the primary school and local church, some were immediately evacuated to the tourist village of Cuada to the south of parish.

On 13 June 2012, the Secretaria Regional da Ciência, Tecnologia e Equipamentos (Regional Secretariat for Science, Technology and Equipment) awarded the contract for construction of two retaining walls, construction of ditches and new paving of the parish to Tecnovia Açores, S.A. in order to improve access to the region following the mudslides.

== Geography ==
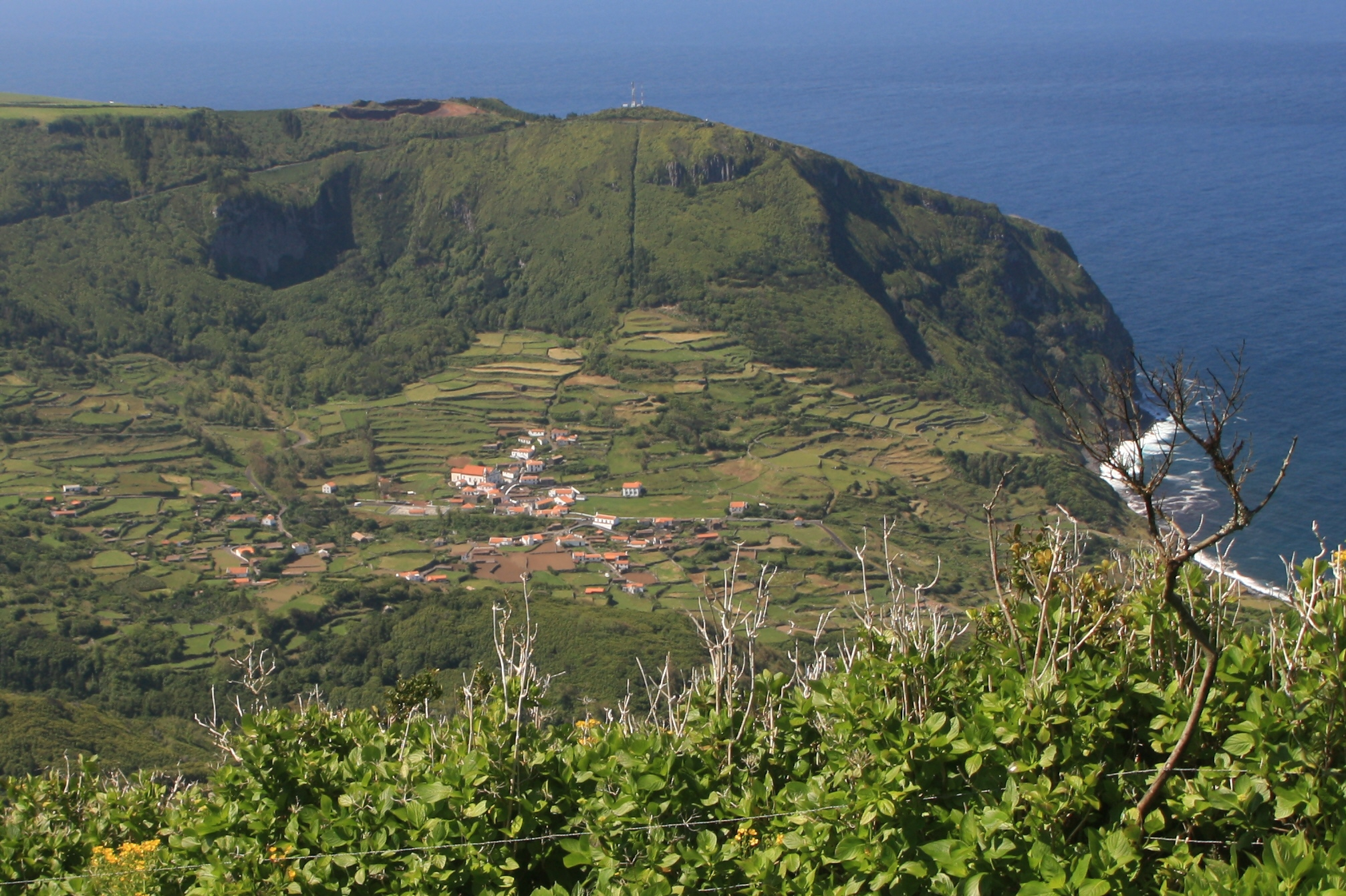
The valley of Fajazinha, bounded in the west by the Atlantic and surrounded by the cliffs on the remaining sides

The parish is located on the west coast of the Flores, south of the Fajã Grande, and extends through an irregular plain that includes four crater-lakes: Lagoa Funda (Deep Lake, which is 108 metres (354 ft) deep), Lagoa Comprida (Long Lake), Lagoa Branca (White Lake), and Lagoa Seca (Dry Lake). It is an area of many peat-bogs, and forests of endemic plants, including the cedro-do-mato (Azorean juniper), used by local artisans. Nearby is the waterfall, Cascata da Ribeira Grande.

Fajãzinha is intersected by the Ribeira Grande, a major river/rapids on the island, which, apart from its crystalline waters, is known for its innumerable floods. Father José António Camões, in his work Roteiro Exacto da Costa da Ilha, mentions the following:

Passing that population you will encounter Ribeira Grande, which divides this parish...its exaggerated force and impetuousness, which is truly great. The waters fall from a formidable height, extreme in the parish of Fajãzinha, from a height of 200 braças [440 metres, 1,440 ft] it falls; it incorporates and aggregates all the waters of the headlands, which demarcate the parish, from the east to southwest, which is the river-valley of the blacksmiths, four grottoes, without name in the Rocha do Velho, the grotto do Enchente, whose waters increase in volume and become furious in the winter, and also when there is rain in the summer, its invariable.

The region is a natural jewel, that João Vieira wrote:

“Along the difficult, the hand of man, with much sweat, constructed a church and houses, opened a road where heavy trucks cross, means of communication with the rest of the island. It's an admirable example of the implantation in the land and harmony with nature. Seen from above, the houses, maybe because of jealousy, run to the seas, accompanying Ribeira Grande, which has for four centuries have filled the navigable waters that crossed between the Old and New World. Between cereal fields of corn that circle the white homes, a road of black asphalt serpentine between greenery. If a biblical paradise existed by the sea...we could think that this corner was part of it...

The 2011 Lorca earthquake was responsible for creating a special wetland around the coast of Fajazinha. Baptized the Lagoa do Rolo, it has become the most westerly lake in Europe, although it is considerably small, spawning a small habitat for migrating birds from North America, during the fall (including the hawfinch and the hooded merganser).

== Architecture ==
=== Civic ===
- Haylofts of Ramal (Portuguese: Palheiros ao Ramal da Fajã Grande), a series of two-storey basalt buildings used for the collection of hay and stores for the winter months;
- Watermill of Ribeira da Alagoa (Portuguese: Moinho de Água de Ribeira da Alagoa), a 19th-century watermill consisting of an "L"-shape structure that served as home and workplace for a corn miller, today used as museological pole to perpetuate agricultural history.

=== Religious ===
- Church of Nossa Senhora dos Remédios (Portuguese: Igreja de Nossa Senhora dos Remédios), triple nave structure constructed through the dedication of Father Alexandre Mesquito, and later supported by contributions of its parishioners (resulting in the addition of the belltower).
