= Western Group =

- Island Group
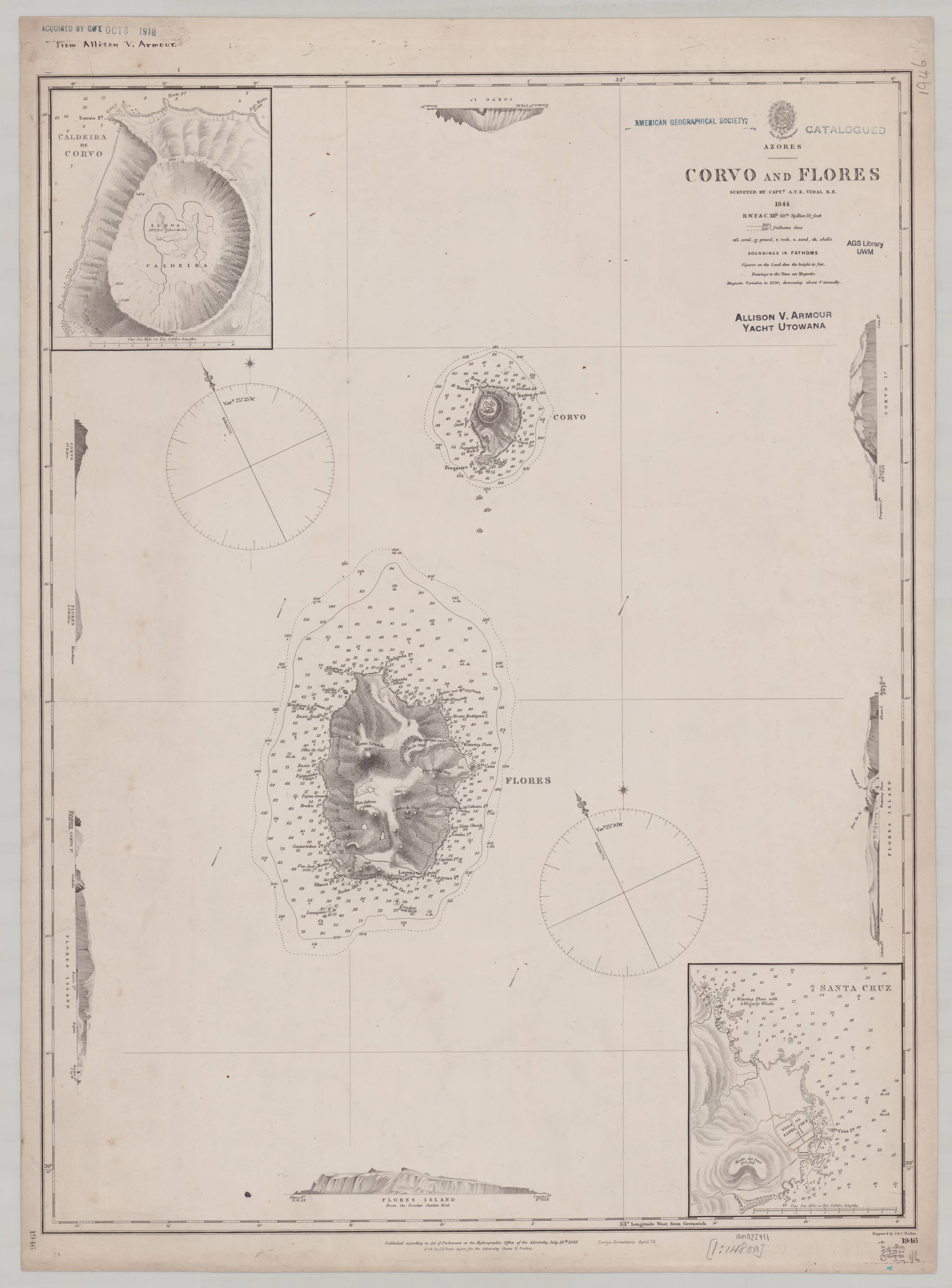
- Nautical chart of Flores and Corvo
- Interactive map of Western Group
- Coordinates: 39°26′37″N 31°11′57″W
- Country: Portugal
- Autonomous Region: Azores
- Region: Atlantic Ocean
- Subregion: Mid-Atlantic Ridge
- Position: Azores Plateau
- Time zone: UTC−1 (AZOT)
  - Summer (DST): AZOST (UTC)

The Western Group is one of the three island groups that form the Azores archipelago in Portugal. It comprises the islands of Flores and Corvo, situated on the North American Plate, approximately 900 miles (1,400 km) west of mainland Portugal.

== History ==
Flores and Corvo were discovered in 1452 by the Portuguese explorers Diogo and João de Teive, and were formally claimed by the kingdom of Portugal in January 1453 under King Afonso V. Flores was so named by 1475 for its profusion of yellow flowers, and Corvo derived its name "Caldeirão" from its volcanic crater.

== Geography ==
The Western group are one of the three groups of islands that form the Azores archipelago, situated approximately 900 miles (1,400 km) west of mainland Portugal. It is composed of two islands–Flores and Corvo. The islands situated on the North American Plate, on the other side of the Mid-Atlantic Ridge. Flores measures 141.7 km^{2} (54.7 sq mi) by area, and consists of rugged, mountainous terrain marked by deep ravines and coastal cliffs. It reaches its highest elevation at Morro Alto at 914 m (2,999 ft). Corvo measures 17.13 km^{2} (6.61 sq mi) by area and consists of a single extinct volcano peaking at Monte Gordo, featuring a 300 m (980 ft)‑deep crater lake. Both islands form part of a designated a UNESCO Biosphere Reserve. The resident population of Flores was recorded as 3,791 inhabitants in 2011, divided among the municipalities of Santa Cruz and Lajes das Flores.

== Transportation ==
Flores and Corvo have small regional airports with inter-island flights, and seasonal connectivity to Lisbon. Regular ferries link Flores to Corvo, with seasonal operations to Horta.
