= Fajã Grande =

- Civil parish
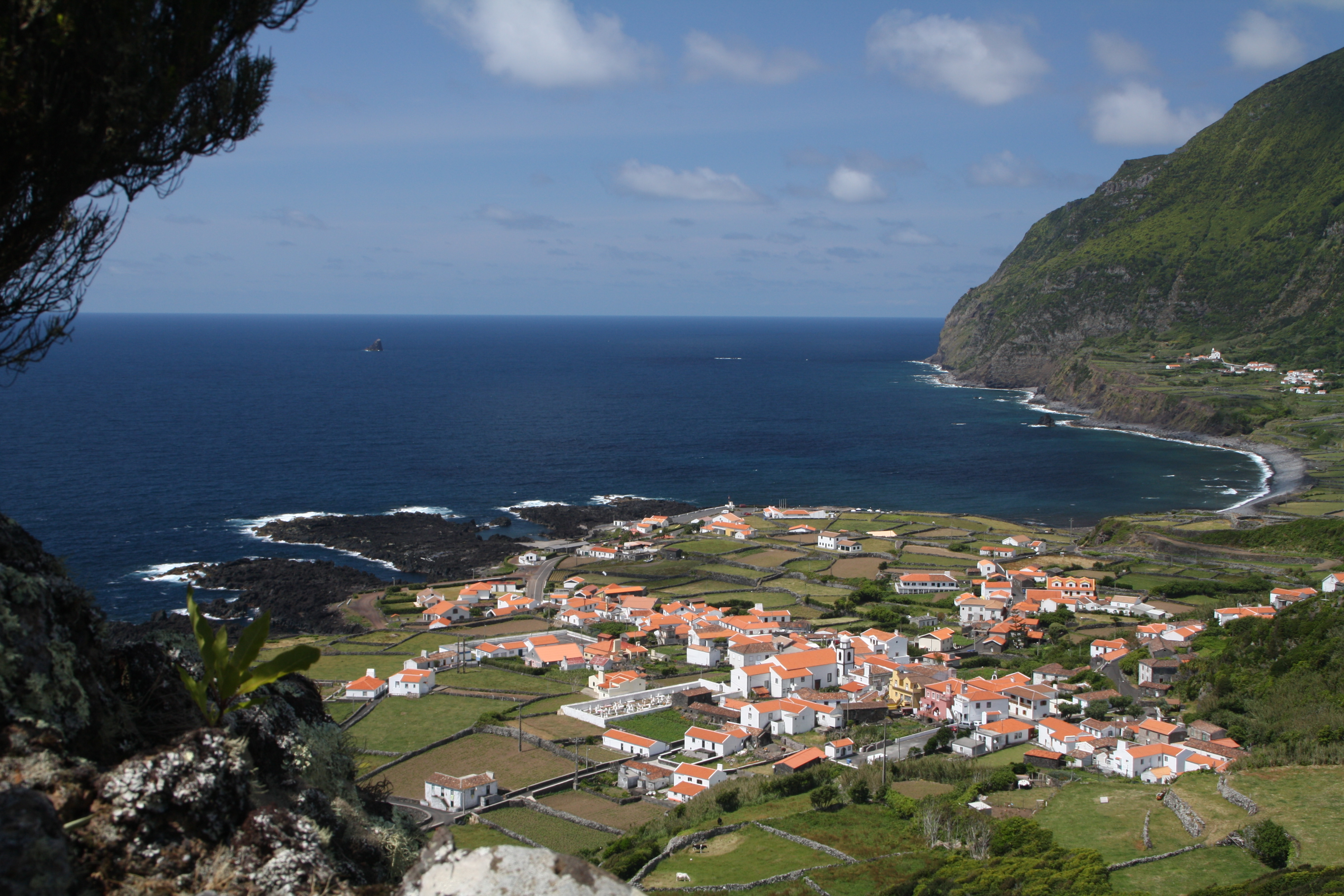
- Main village of Fajã Grande, as seen from a local miradouro, showing the coastline to the area of Canto, and the distant escarpment of Ponta da Fajã (far right)

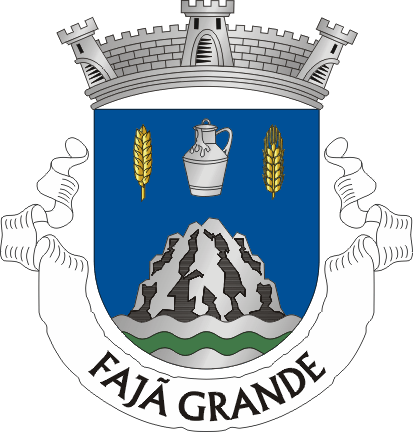
- Coat of arms

- Location in the Azores Fajã Grande (Flores Island (Azores))
- Coordinates: 39°27′13″N 31°15′45″W
- Country: Portugal
- Auton. region: Azores
- Island: Flores
- Municipality: Lajes das Flores
- Established: Parish: 4 April 1861; Civil parish: 28 November 1864

Area
  - Total: 12.97 km^{2} (5.01 sq mi)
- Elevation: 29 m (95 ft)

Population (2021)
  - Total: 220
  - Density: 17/km^{2} (44/sq mi)
- Time zone: UTC−01:00 (AZOT)
  - Summer (DST): UTC+00:00 (AZOST)
- Postal code: 9960-040
- Area code: 292
- Patron: São José
- Website: freguesiafajagrande.webs.com

Fajã Grande (pronounced [fa.ˈʒɐ̃ ˈɡɾɐ̃.dɨ]) is a rural civil parish in the municipality of Lajes das Flores in the Portuguese archipelago of the Azores. The population in 2021 was 220, in an area of 12.97 km^{2}. Although it is a relatively small population, it is one of the largest centers in the municipality of Lajes das Flores, about 17 kilometres (11 miles) from the municipal seat, and the westernmost settlement in Europe; the closest North American settlement is St. John's, Newfoundland and Labrador, Canada, being about 1,100 nautical miles (2,000 km; 1,300 mi) away. The North Atlantic archipelago of Bermuda, a British Overseas Territory formerly part of British North America, is 3,089 kilometres (1,919 mi) to the west and has close ties with the Azores through population migration.

== Toponymy ==
Meaning "big fajã", a special term roughly referring to a coastal scree influenced by lava, as the town resides down from a notable cliff-face.

== History ==
The western coast of Flores was slowly occupied in the middle of the 16th century, with the first population centers forming in the beginning of the 17th century. The first settlers were captained by João Soares, from the island of São Miguel, and who settled in Lajedo. The fertile land permitted the cultivation of woad, one of the most important commercial ventures in the Azores. As the Azorean chronicler Father Gaspar Frutuoso writing in the 16th century, indicated, that the colonists benefited from the abundance of water and easy access to the sea:

"There, about a quarter league is Fajã, called "Big" [referring to its name Great/Grande Fajã] which offers bread and woad on elevated land, with a few berths for Caravels, it produces at least 50 moios [Portuguese unit of solid measure] of bread and woad, and where, also, there is shellfish and fish of all kinds, and along its cape a beach, half a league in size, where there is always a strong ocean current; and from there, another half a league, the cliffs are covered with much urzela [a lichen], and large rocks, that spawn an infinity of seafood and large crabs, and from here, there is an explosion of rocks that fall to the sea, like a guns spray, where we find limpets and cowrie shells; and in front of this point, which forms a bay, where many type of ships anchor, including Carracks from India. In the middle of this anchorage a great river-valley falls from the cliffs to sea."

Although being populated for less than a century, Fajã Grande was already a center of commercial activity; caravels arriving from India were likely to stopover in Fajã Grande since it was one of the first ports to be discovered on their return. On the port of Fajã Grande, Father José António Camões, noted the following about its installations:

"...there is a small breakwater called Baixa d’Agoa. Continue down until you get to the port of Fajã Grande, which has in the middle a great mound of sand and rock called Calhau da Barra. Within this Calhau is a large "puddle" called the Poção, which gives refuge to ships that arrive from the sea."

The fertility of the land permitted the cultivation of the lichen Rocella tinctoria (Roccellaceae), a plant sought after by many of the commercial interests in the region eager to support the dye industries of Europe. The abundance of fresh water, and port, also made Fajã Grande an important stopover for pirates and privateers; while other communities in the archipelago lived in fear of pirates, Fajã Grande maintained a collaborative relationship and sold consumables to local crews.

It was likely one of the most prosperous communities in the western coast, resulting in its de-annexation from the neighbouring parish of Lajes das Flores, in July 1676. To create the new parish of Fajãs, the local community in Ponta da Fajã was de-annexed from the neighbouring parish of São Pedro de Ponta Delgada and integrated into the new administrative and ecclesiastical division. The formal delimitation of the parish was presided by Father Domingos Nunes Pereira, and the new Fajãs parish priest Father André Alves de Mendonça, on 12/13 July 1676.

Writing around 1720, Father António Cordeiro, affirmed that the Fajãs included about 80 homes. The creation of an autonomous parish in Fajã Grande dates back to 1855, when the administration of the District of Horta attempted to resolve the call by its residents to create a new civil parish. The debate was finally ended by the civil governor, Luís Teixeira de Sampaio, who reported on 3 April 1857, that a single parish of Fajã Grande was desirable, owing to its distance from the community of Fajãzinha (then parish seat), the size of its community, and the problem caused by annual floodings along the Riberia Grande river, which regularly cut links annually. Local narratives mention several instances when the Ribeira Grande impeded travel to Fajãzinha, resulting in the faithful having services at the Pedra da Missa (English: Stone of Mass), an elevated point on the river bank where they gathered, prayed and then dispersed after celebrating the liturgy. Governor Sampaio also noted that American whaling and high-seas travel had brought a new importance to the village, also justifying a rethink of the existing administrative divisions. Finally, on 4 April 1861, King Pedro V of Portugal decreed the creation of a new ecclesiastical parish, to include Ponta, Fajã Grande and Cuada, centred on the Church of São José da Fajã Grande (the responsibility of the Bishop of Angra, friar Estêvão de Jesus Maria, dated 20 June 1861. The parochial church was constructed from the small chapel (which was built in 1755, and blessed on 24 May 1757); the new temple was blessed on 1 August 1850, after three years of construction (it was finally completed in 1849). Due to further support from American emigrant José Luís da Silveira, the church was remodelled in 1880. A new church was later constructed in the area of Ponta da Fajã (the Church of Nossa Senhora do Carmo) and remained in use until 1922. Similarly, on 28 September 1969, a chapel in Ponta was completed, to the invocation of Nossa Senhora da Fátima.

Landslides around the area of Ponta da Fajã in 1987 resulted in the declaration of this zone as high risk resulting in the express prohibition of new buildings and future remodeling of existing homes. Further landslides around Covas, in 1991, resulted in new laws to restrict residents in the area, which was ignored by the 20 inhabitants, who have maintained existing buildings .

== Geography ==
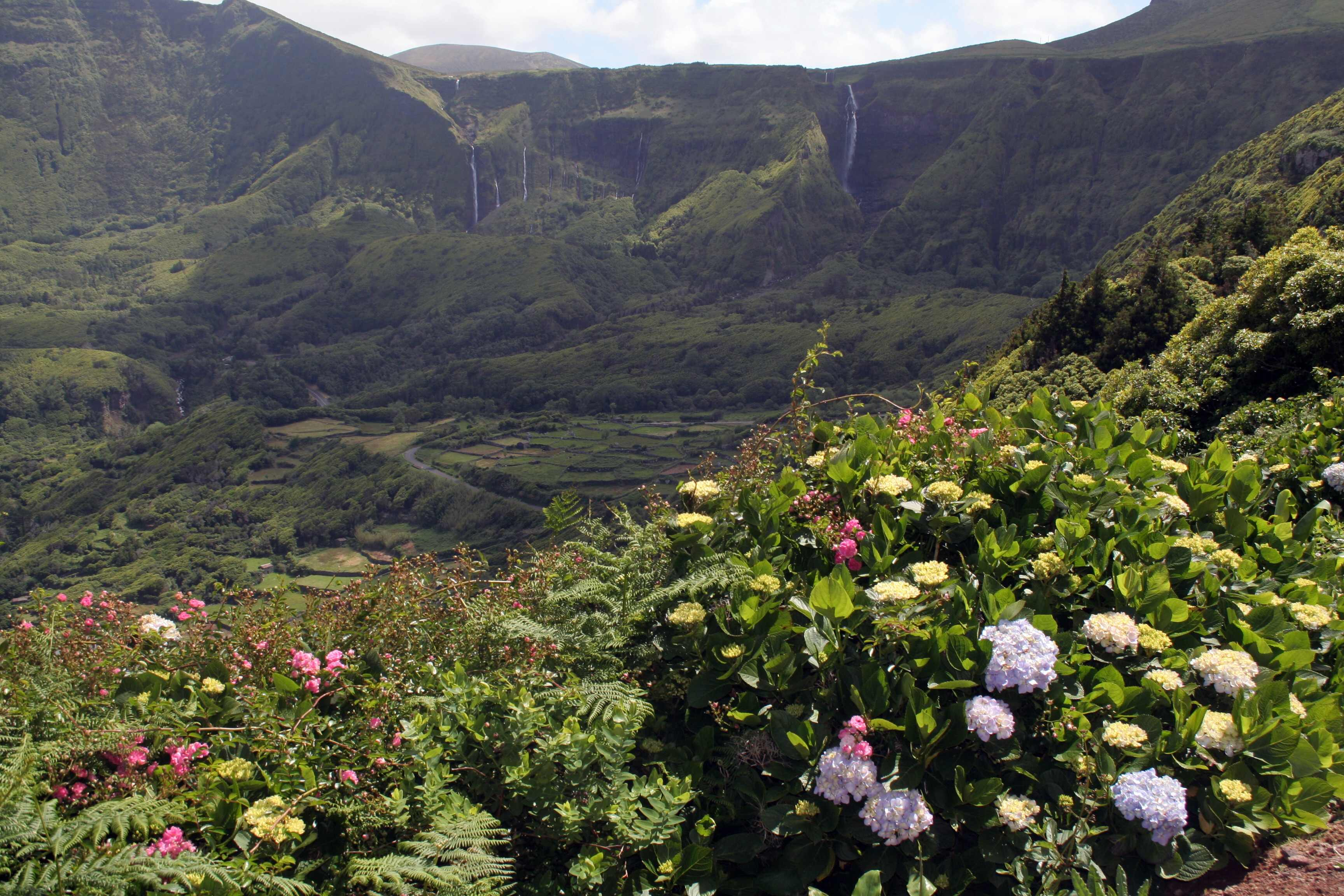
The Rocha da Fajã Escarpment showing many of the waterfalls and cliff face, Fajã Grande

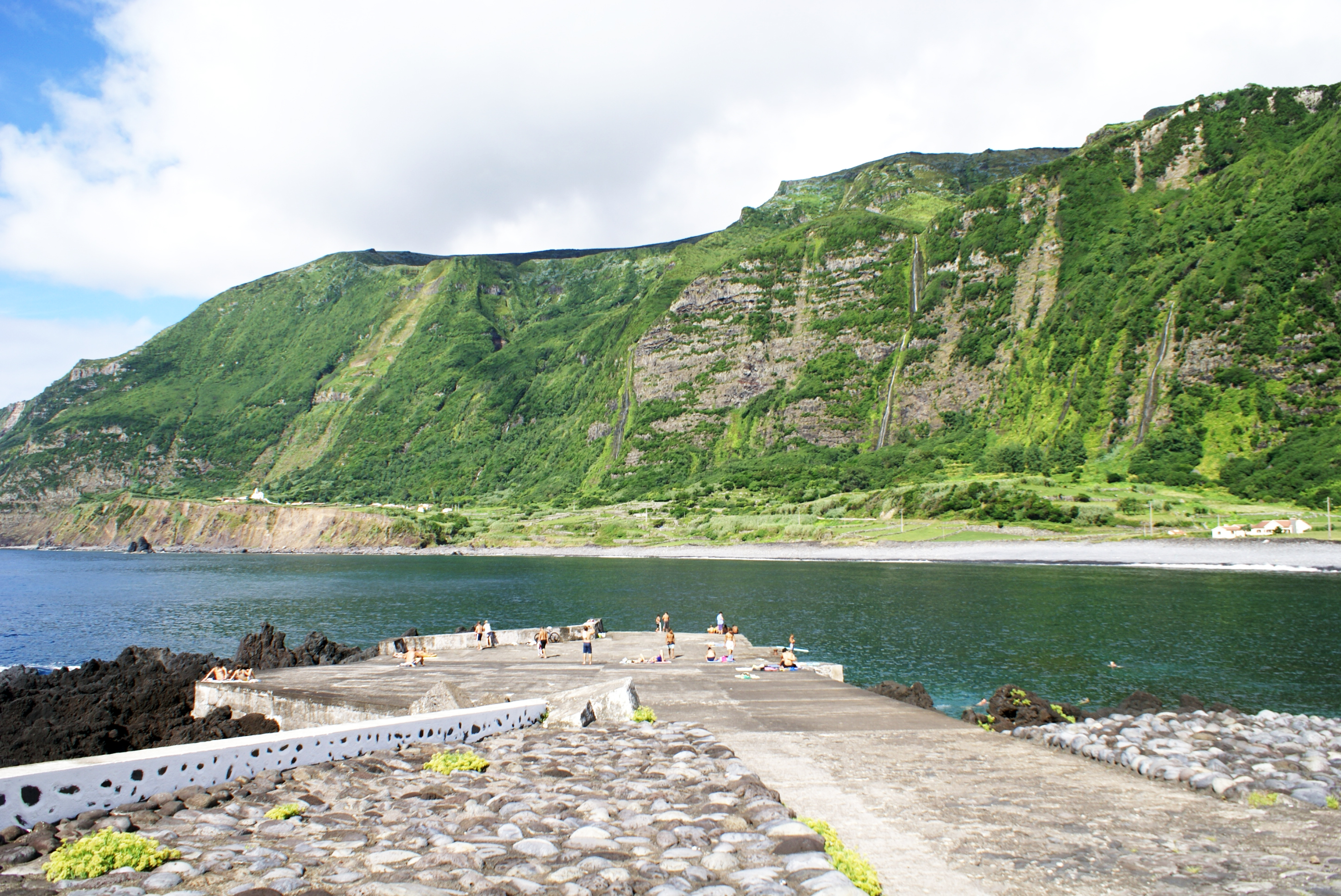
The port and swimming area of the main town

=== Physical geography ===
The village is located in an extensive fajã (a small area of flat fertile land at the bottom of a seaside cliff composed of volcanic and geomorphological debris) on the western coast and delimited by the Rocha da Fajã escarpment (that extends from the northwest to southeast border) and the Ribeira Grande river along the south. The escarpment is an almost sheer cliff face, approximately 600 meters in some places. The rest of Fajã Grande is formed from erosional forces along the Rocha da Fajã, producing a rich soil, although rocky, that is nutrient-rich due to the abundance of water from river tributaries. The escarpment is also a protective feature, permitting the cultivation of orchards and small parcels, and yams in the well-irrigated parcels along the river. Above the Rocha, about 550 metres (1,800 ft), the parish extends onto an irregular plateau covered in natural vegetation and peat. The excessive precipitation in this region, which usually exceeds 4,000 millimetres (160 in) annually, means that the river-valleys are always flooded or inundated. The northwest border extends along the western coast of the parish on a strip of land adjacent to the escarpment.

Situated on the plateau are four large crater lakes, Lagoa da Caldeira Funda (Lake of the Deep Crater), Lagoa da Caldeira Comprida (Lake of the Long Crater) and Lagoa da Caldeira Branca (Lake of the White Crater) which are full throughout the year, and the peat-covered Lagoa da Caldeira Seca (Lake of the Dry Crater) which only occasionally becomes flooded. The Lagoa dos Patos (Lake of the Ducks) is located at the base of the plateau.

Off the western coast, the Monchique Islet, is the westernmost point of the Azores (and Europe).

=== Climate ===
Climate data for Fajã Grande, 1977-1995, altitude 35 m (115 ft)
Month	Jan	Feb	Mar	Apr	May	Jun	Jul	Aug	Sep	Oct	Nov	Dec	Year
Average precipitation mm (inches)	135.5 (5.33)	133.9 (5.27)	101.9 (4.01)	99.4 (3.91)	94.1 (3.70)	65.1 (2.56)	56.7 (2.23)	67.2 (2.65)	109.0 (4.29)	134.5 (5.30)	167.4 (6.59)	170.9 (6.73)	1,335.6 (52.57)
Source: Portuguese Environmental Agency

=== Human geography ===
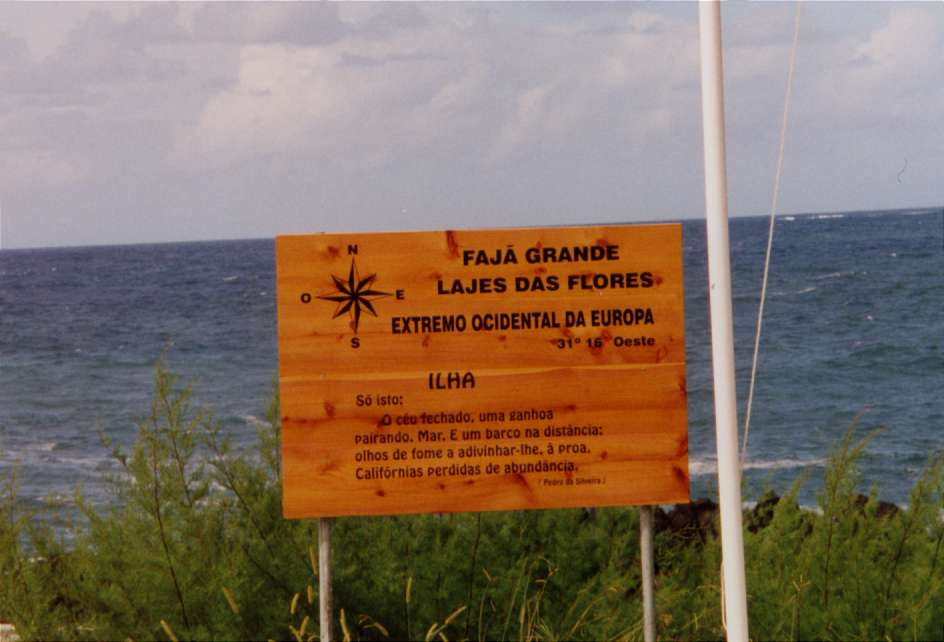
Westernmost village in the Azores, Portugal and Europe

The escarpment surrounds the community composed of three nuclei: Fajã Grande (the largest population), Ponta da Fajã Grande (a narrow strip between the coast and Rocha da Fajã), and Cuada (a settlement located on a plateau bordering the parish of Fajãzinha to the south). Cuada, for many years, was a collection of uninhabited homes, but today it has been rejuvenated by rural tourism, and classified as an Area of Municipal Interest.

The port at Fajã Grande, once an important commercial port, has lost much of its importance and is now used recreationally and, only rarely, for disembarking commercial goods. The entire zone is valued for its coastal waters, attracting both swimmers and surfers from around the island.

Between 1960 and 1980, approximately 60% of the active population emigrated to the United States and Canada.

== Economy ==
Fajã Grande had always been characterized by its land and connection to the sea, resulting in a considerable part of its population employed in the primary industries (about 50%), that included agriculture, livestock husbandry and fishing. Over time, secondary industries began to occupy a greater part of the local activities (but generally hovered around 20% of activities), and primarily tourism, commerce and complementary services.

== Architecture ==
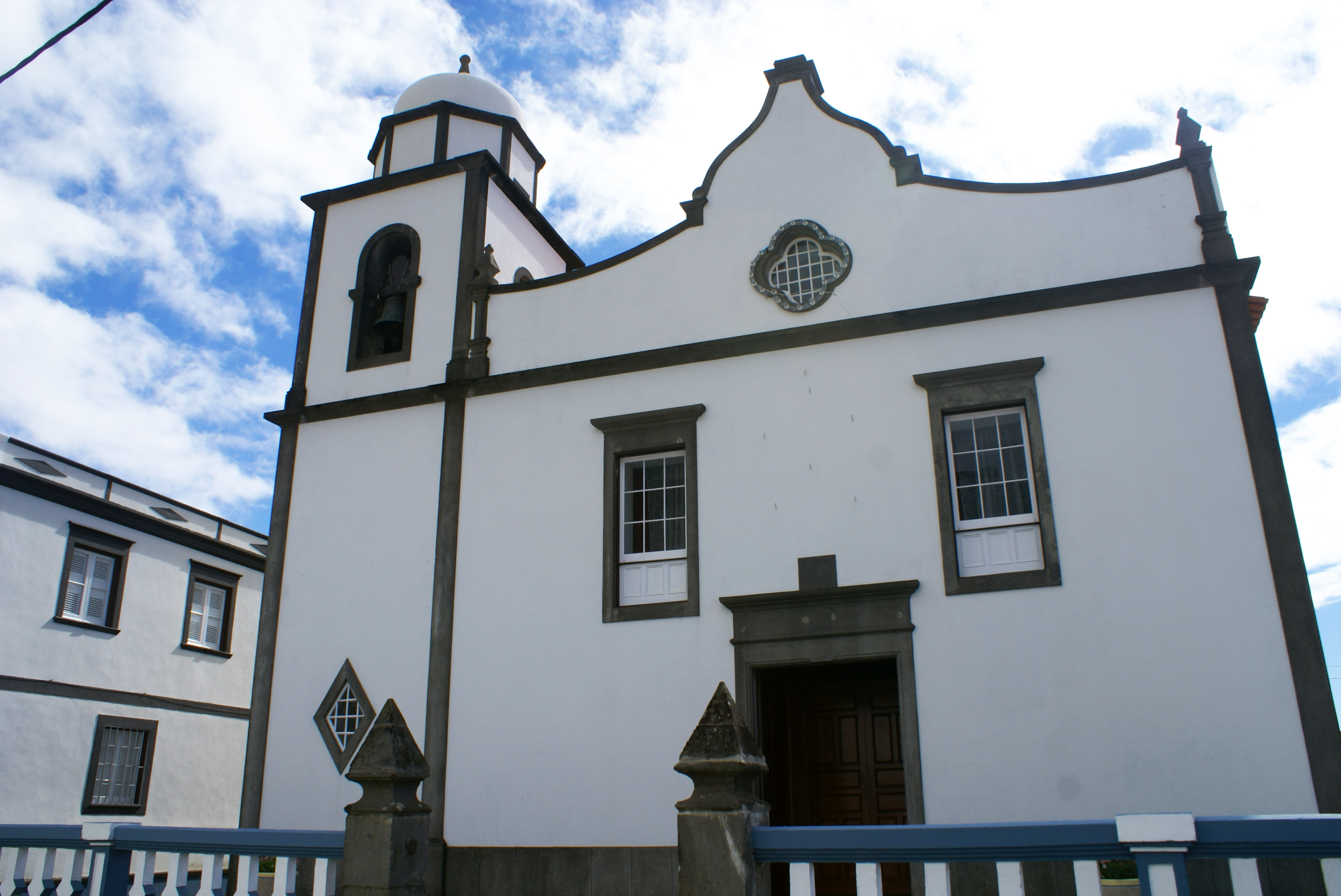
The parochial Church of São José

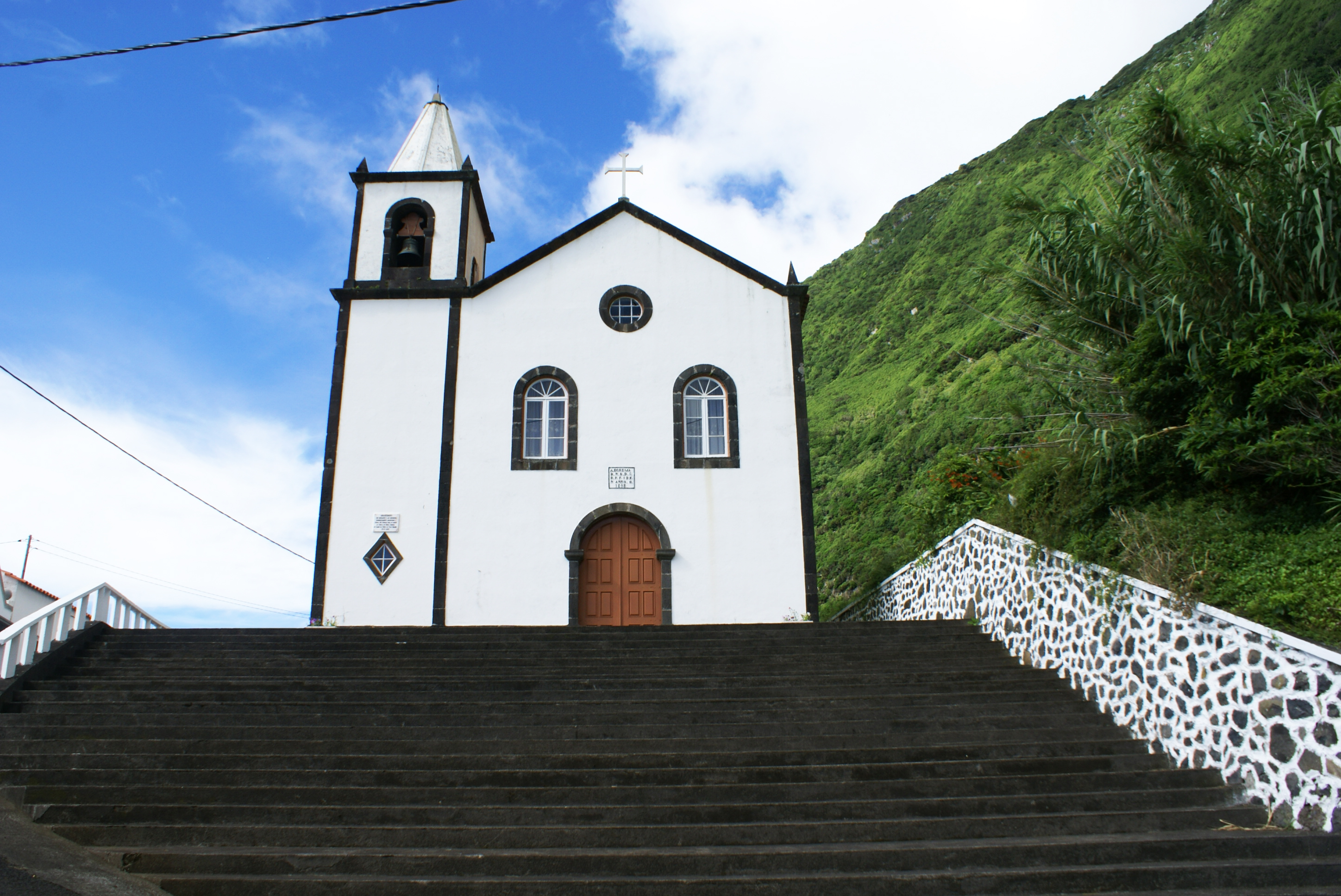
The church in the locality of Ponta da Fajã, dedicated to Nossa Senhora do Carmo

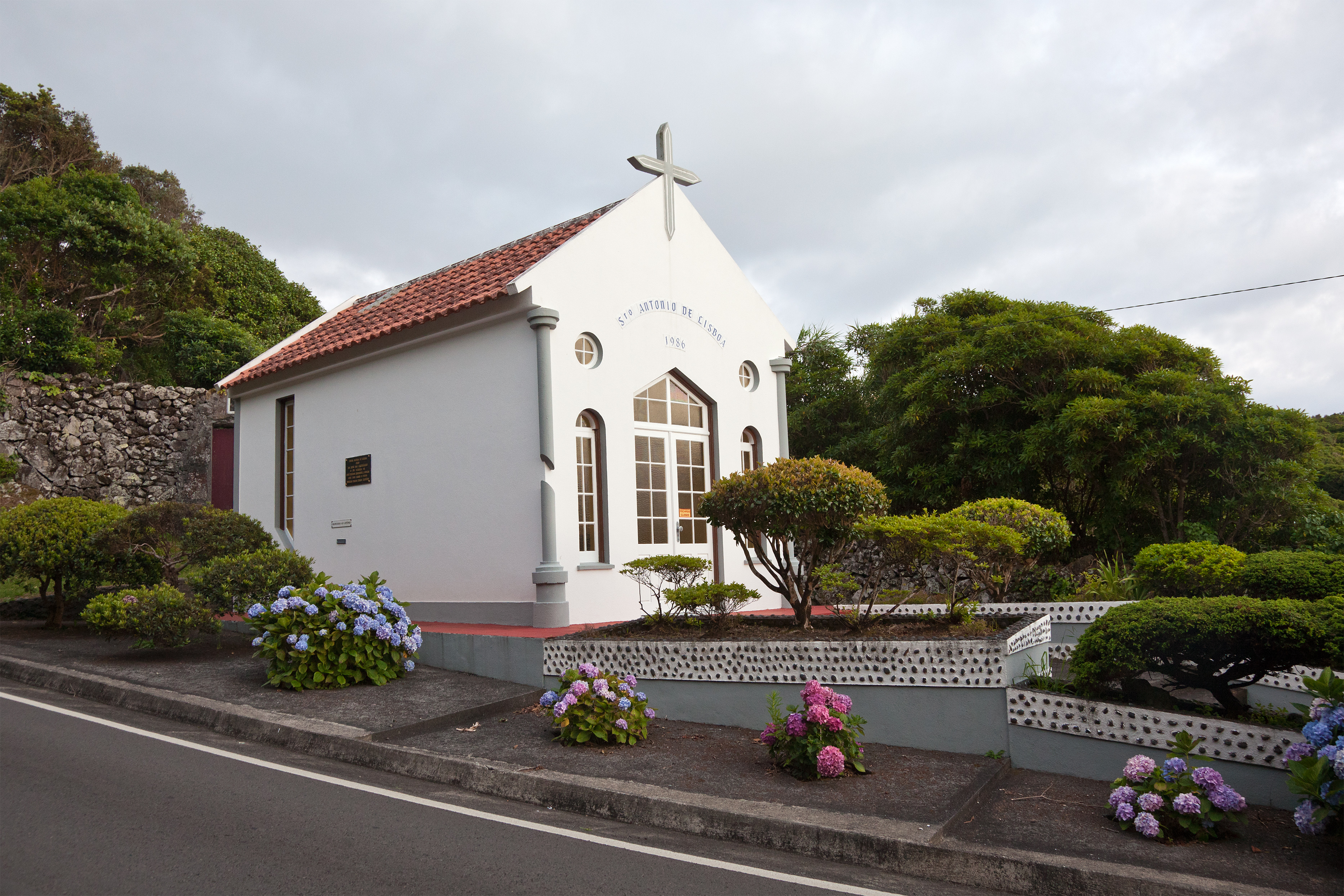
The Chapel of Santo António

=== Civic ===
- Site of Cuada (Portuguese: Sítio da Cuada/Lugar da Cuada)
- Whalewatching lookout (Portuguese: Vigia da baleia), a cabin overlooking the cliffs of Fajã Grande, with a panoramic view of the coast, used in the whaling industry to site pods of whales and direct whaling boats.

=== Religious ===
- Chapel of Santo António, on a path within the locality of Cuada;
- Church of Nossa Senhora do Carmo (Portuguese: Ermida da Ponta da Fajã/Igreja de Nossa Senhora do Carmo), erected in 1898, in the locality of Ponta da Fajã, consisting of a single nave building with belltower;
- Church of São José (Portuguese: Igreja Paroquial de Fajã Grande/Igreja de São José), constructed in 1868, it was based on a primitive chapel dedicated to Saint Joseph, which was originally built in 1755. The church is distinguished for two altars in the arch separating the chamber and chancel.
- Império of Cuada (Portuguese: Casa do Espírito Santo da Cuada), dated from 1841, a treatro involved in the festivals of Pentecost.

== Culture ==
Generally, Fajã Grande is typical of rural associativism, an agricultural centre underpinned by the socio-cultural dynamism of sport and social celebration. Fajã Grande includes several collective groups involved in daily life:

- Tuna Sol Mar, created in early 1993, it comprises people with interest in the musical arts, including playing, chorus and folklore traditional of Flores;
- Filarmónica União Musical Nossa Senhora da Saúde, instituted in 1950, a philharmonic band comprising 15 elements, whom promote music at local and regional festivities;
- Casa do Povo de Fajã Grande, a physical space, the people's house functions as a local social assistance and hall for meetings and events.

== Notable citizens ==
Fajã Grande has, over time, been a cradle for a few personalities, who have become notable in Azorean history, including specifically:

- José António Camões (Fajãzinha; 10 December 1777 — Ponta Delgada, 18 January 1827), a Catholic priest, poet, instructor, historian, and author of various works of satire, including his heroic satire O Testamento de D. Burro, Pai dos Asnos (The Testament of D. Burro, Father of the Asses), where he skewered Florentine society. Betrayed by the slighted members of the nobility and Roman Catholic clerics, he died a pauper. But, in the 20th century, his prose and incites brought the priest new fame, for his contributions to the local poor and his support for education;
- José Luís de Fraga, a Roman Catholic priest, noted for his oratory, writings and musical abilities;
- João Joaquim André de Freitas (Fajã Grande, 1860 — Lisbon, 22 June 1929), better known as Senator André de Freitas, he was a politician and benmerit, who began his career as a deputy within the Regenerator Party, and nominated to the post of Civil Governor of the district of Horta in 1908;
- Pedro Laureano Mendonça da Silveira (Fajã Grande, 5 September 1922 — Lisbon, 2003), literary critic, historian and poet, with several public works. He was part of the executive board of the magazine Seara Nova (until 1974) and author of various works of poetry and literature including the A Ilha e o Mundo (1953).
