= Flores Island (Azores) =

Island of Portugal

Native name: Ilha das Flores Nickname: The Pink Island
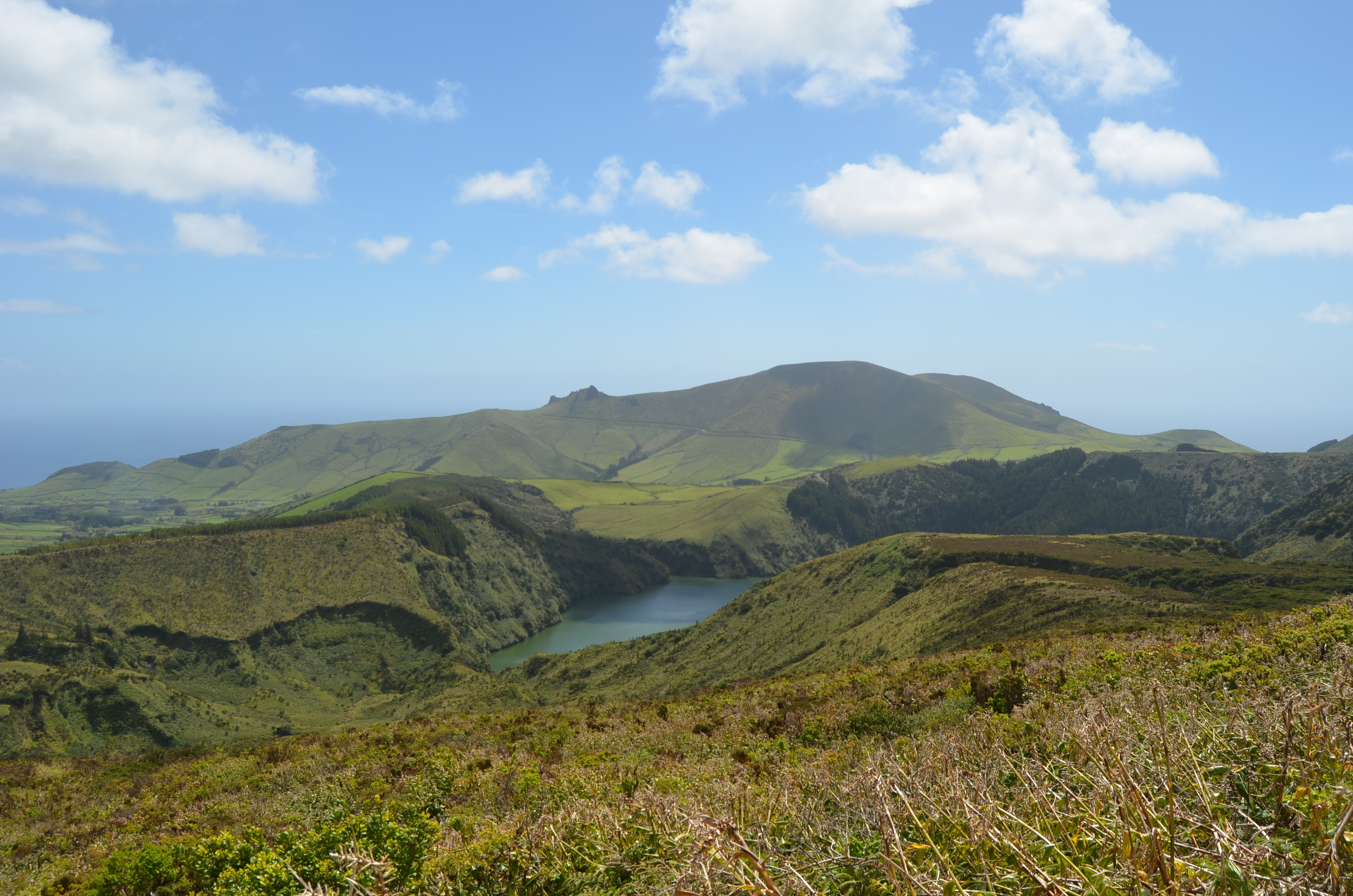
- View of the island's southern side, with the Funda Lake downhill

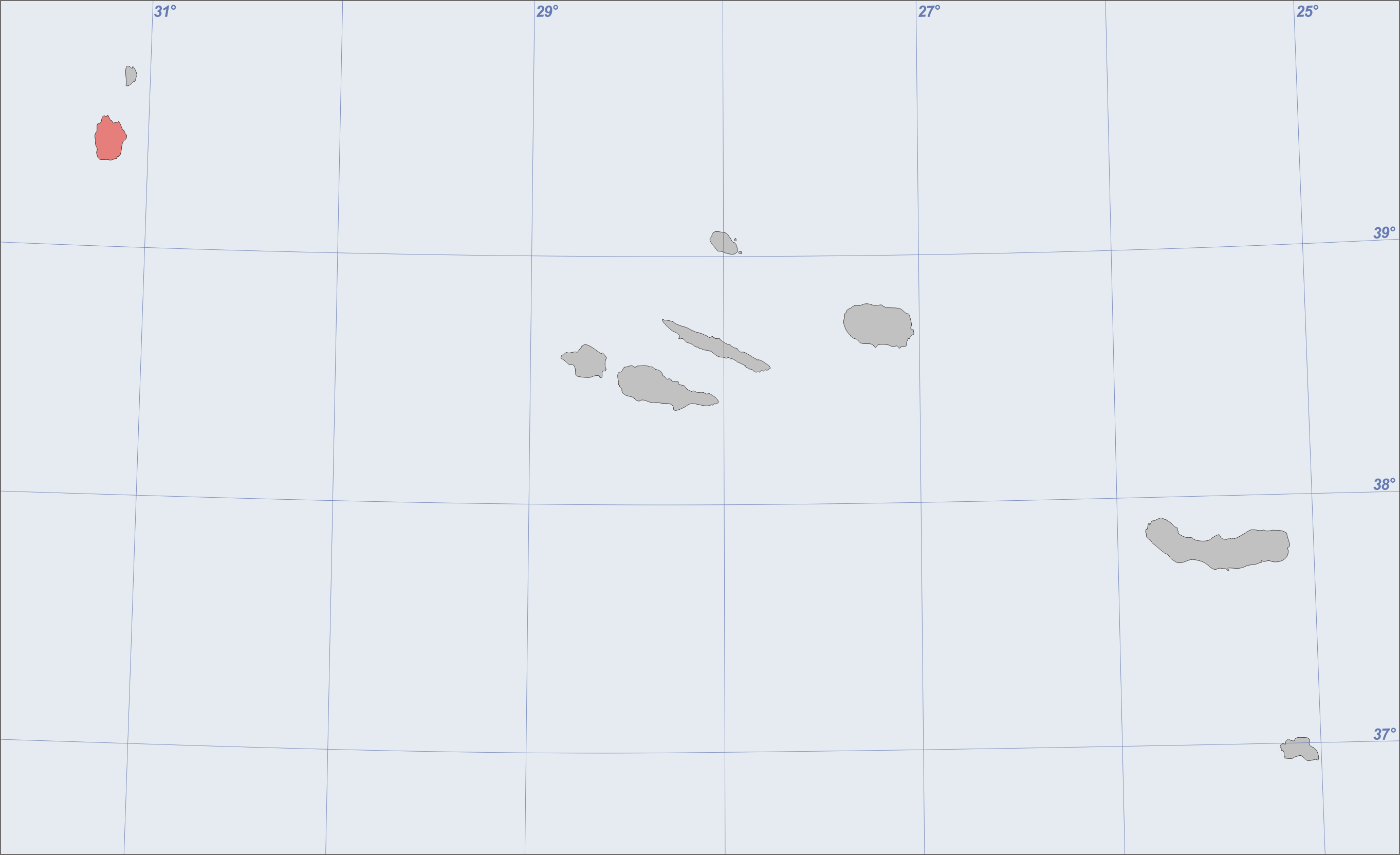
- Location of the island of Flores in the archipelago of the Azores

Geography
- Location: Atlantic Ocean
- Coordinates: 39°26′37″N 31°11′57″W
- Archipelago: Azores
- Area: 141.02 km^{2} (54.45 sq mi)
- Coastline: 72.79 km (45.23 mi)
- Highest elevation: 915 m (3002 ft)
- Highest point: Morro Alto

Administration
- Portugal
- Autonomous Region: Azores
- Municipalities: Lajes das Flores; Santa Cruz das Flores

Demographics
- Demonym: Florense/Florentino
- Population: ▼3,428 (2021)
- Pop. density: 28.33/km^{2} (73.37/sq mi)
- Languages: Portuguese
- Ethnic groups: Portuguese

Additional information
- Time zone: UTC−01:00

Flores Island (Portuguese: Ilha das Flores; Portuguese pronunciation: [ˈfloɾɨʃ]) is an island of the Western Group (Grupo Ocidental) of the Azores.

It has an area of 143 km^{2}, a population of 3,428 inhabitants, and, together with Corvo Island of the western archipelago, lies within the North American Plate. The nearby Monchique Islet is the westernmost point of Portugal.

It has been referred to as the pink island due to the abundance of pink hydrangeas on the island and association with poet Raul Brandão. It is well known for its abundance of flowers, hence its Portuguese name of Flores.

== History ==
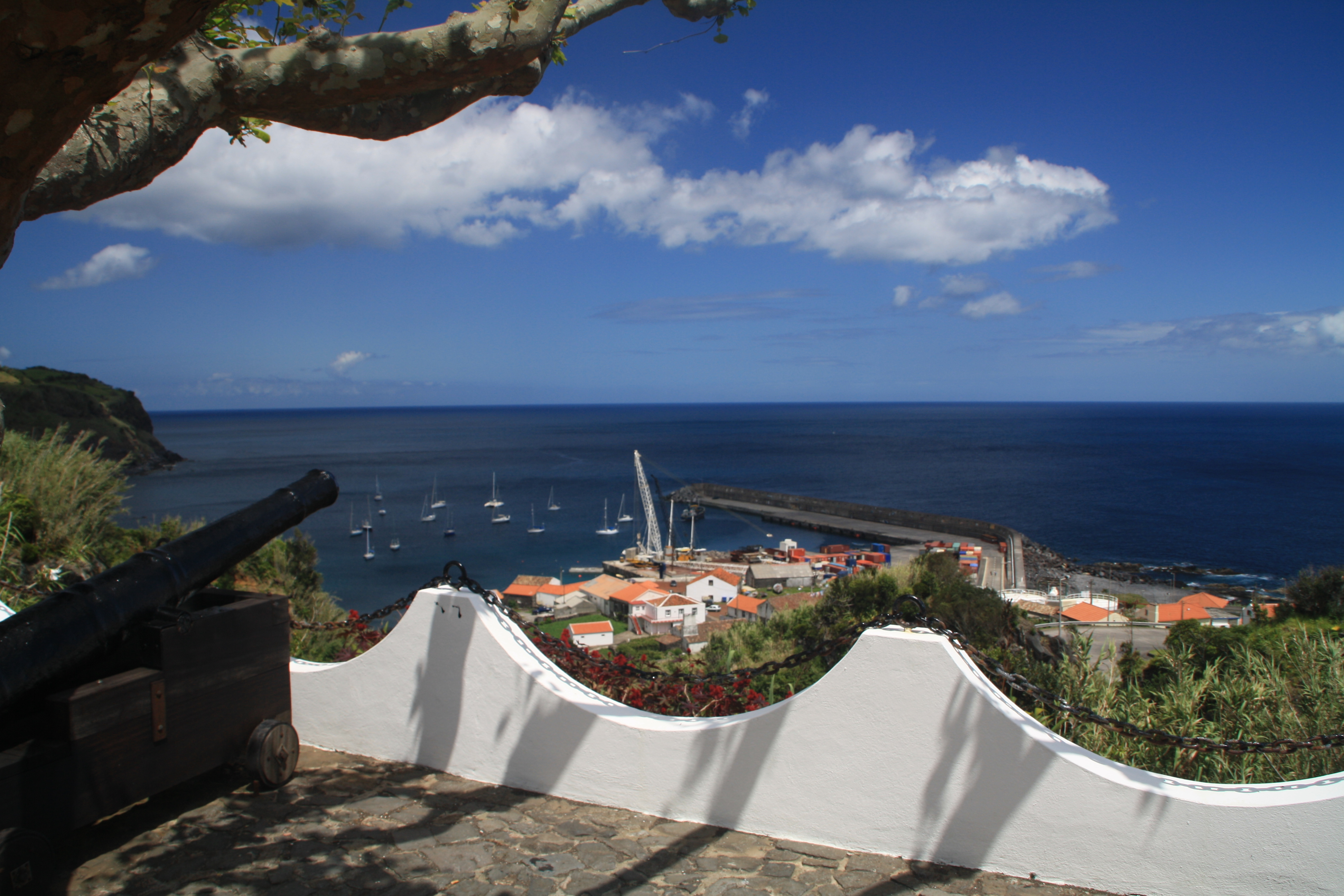
Former fort that defended the port of Lajes

Some early accounts existed of the "(seven) islands of the Azores and two islands of Flores" (referring to the islands of Flores and Corvo), but no "official discovery" occurred until the mid-15th century. The island of Flores was discovered in the late summer of 1452 by the navigator Diogo de Teive and his son João de Teive, and first noted by the pilot Pêro Velasco to Christopher Columbus during his voyages. For his reward, Teive received the concession of the sugar monopoly on Madeira.

The earlier names of the island were São Tomás (after Thomas Becket of Canterbury, not to be confused with Saint Thomas, which in Portuguese is spelled Tomé) and Santa Iria (Saint Iria). The island's charter passed to Fernão Teles de Meneses when little was accomplished in populating the islands, except for disembarking some sheep (1475). The death of Fernão Teles (1477) was to initiate exploration and settlement on the island, as his widow (Dona Maria de Vilhena) would contract the Flemish nobleman Willem van der Haegen to explore Flores and Corvo.

After meeting with Dona Maria Vilhena (who administered the island in the name of her young son, Rui de Teles), Van der Haegen came to an agreement and moved to the island between 1480 and 1490. Van der Haegen had arrived in the Azores in 1469 and lived for a time on Faial Island by invitation of the first Captain of Faial, Josse van Huerter. Following disagreements with van Huerter over land holdings, Van de Haegen settled in Quatro Ribeiras, Terceira until journeying to Ribeira da Cruz on Flores during the reign of King John II. The historians Gaspar Frutuoso and Diogo das Chagas noted that Van der Haegen cultivated lands (primarily for wheat export) and was involved in the indigo/woad industry, as well as exploring for mineral deposits (likely silver). Due to its isolated location outside shipping lanes, its intemperate climate, and infertile lands, he left Flores ten years later to resettle in Terceira by way of São Jorge Island. At the time, the name of the island was Corvo.

According to Bartolomé de las Casas, two dead bodies that looked like those of Amerindians were found on Flores. He said he found that fact in Columbus' notes, and it was one reason why Columbus presumed that India was on the other side of the ocean.

By 1504, the island's charter had passed to João Fonseca and settlers streamed through the port of Armoeira to the small hamlets. The island became permanently populated during the reign of King Manuel I in the year 1510 by people from various regions of continental Portugal, mainly from the northern provinces. The island became arable and grain and vegetables were cultivated. Over the next centuries, the inhabitants lived in isolated parts of the island and were visited by vessels from Faial and Terceira which came infrequently to trade whale oil, butter, and honey for other products, or those caravels that stopped en route to Europe. Several of the main communities and local sites were named for settlers of this mid-century period, including Santa Cruz, Lajes and Ponta Delgada.

The name of the island of Flores has been made familiar to generations of English readers by the opening line of Alfred, Lord Tennyson's poem "The Revenge: A Ballad of the Fleet": "At Flores in the Azores Sir Richard Grenville lay...", referring to the small English fleet of six ships (there were actually 22) under Lord Thomas Howard, anchored in the bay of Ribeira da Cruz in Flores, that on 9 September 1591 was surprised by 53 ships under Alfonso de Bazán. The English ships were part of a naval patrol intended to intercept Spanish ships from the Americas and were under repair and re-provisioning when the Spanish ships appeared. Five of the English ships slipped out to sea to the west of Corvo, but the Revenge (under Sir Richard Grenville) waited for her sick crew, many of whom had an epidemic of fever, to be returned from the shore, then decided to go straight through the approaching Spanish lines from the east. Revenge fought the Spanish ships for fifteen hours, resisting multiple attempts to board her. Her fatally wounded captain eventually ordered her to be scuttled ("Sink me the ship, Master Gunner—sink her, split her in twain!/Fall into the hands of God, not into the hands of Spain!"), but her crew instead negotiated an honourable surrender ("And the stately Spanish men to their flagship bore him then,/ Where they laid him by the mast, old Sir Richard caught at last,/ And they praised him to his face with their courtly foreign grace..."). The Battle of Flores, as it was known, culminated in the death of Grenville two days later and the Revenge became the only English ship to be captured during the Elizabethan conflict. However, the ship never reached Spain; it foundered during a storm near Terceira and went down with 200 Spaniards, along with several other Spanish ships.

Despite the isolation, the waters of Flores were frequently raided by pirates. Sir Walter Raleigh, the English privateer, was one of the early profiteers; he captured, after a bitter battle, the Portuguese carrack Madre de Deus laden with tonnes of spices, precious gems, and pearls, equivalent to half the public finances of the English court. Unusual for its time, the Madre de Deus was three times the capacity of a normal English brig, and the pirates towed it to the port of Dartmouth rather than destroying the ship.

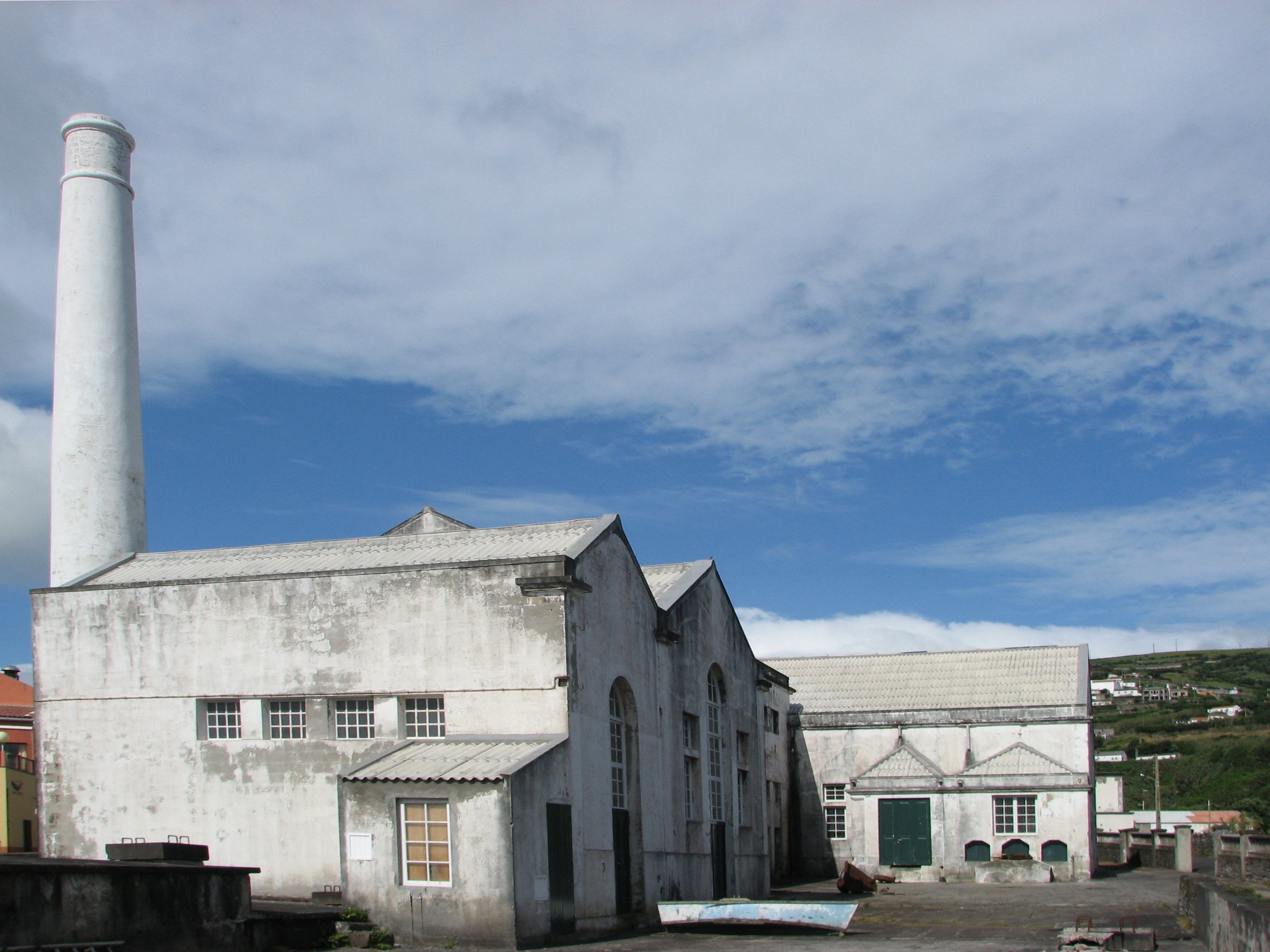
Boqueirão Whale Factory, continuously active during the late 19th and early 20th centuries

The pirate Peter Easton, who commanded a fleet of 40 privateers, made Flores a regular port-of-call, provisioning meat, water and kindling for his travels and supposedly married a daughter of the Captaincy of Flores. Doubly inconvenienced with the damages caused by this pirate's ships and with the complicity of local Florentines, Philip II of Portugal (Philip III of Spain) ordered, on July 30, 1611, the necessary means taken to capture Easton. He was never captured, although the local Florentine magistrate and Captain were arrested.

From the 1760s to the early 20th century, American whalers hunted sperm whales in the waters of the Azores, and many of the islands' inhabitants were recruited as whalers. The American whaler, Wanderer, operated off the coast of Flores between 1878 and 1924.

The CSS Alabama, an American Confederate States Navy ship, the most prolific commerce raider in the waters off Flores, was responsible for 69 sinkings in the course of two years beginning in the summer of 1862. Between 5 and 18 September 1862, it was responsible for capturing and setting ablaze the schooner Starlight, along with whalers off the coast of Flores.

The island's isolation has been remedied during the 20th century, first with the installation of telegraph services, then the establishment of Radio-Flores (1909), and later with point-to-point telephone communication (1925). Service between the island and the rest of the archipelago was handled by small sailing ships until the beginning of the century, with ships such as the 36-ton yacht Santa Cruz or 80-ton yacht Flores, until the latter was lost in the bay of Porto Pim, Horta, Faial during a storm.

In July 1962, the French laid the foundations for a missile tracking installation on the island, which was inaugurated in October 1966. In the following years, a hospital, a power station, and an airport were established, which brought a financial upswing to the entire island. After the French left the island in 1994, tourism became the island's dominant industry.

== Geography ==
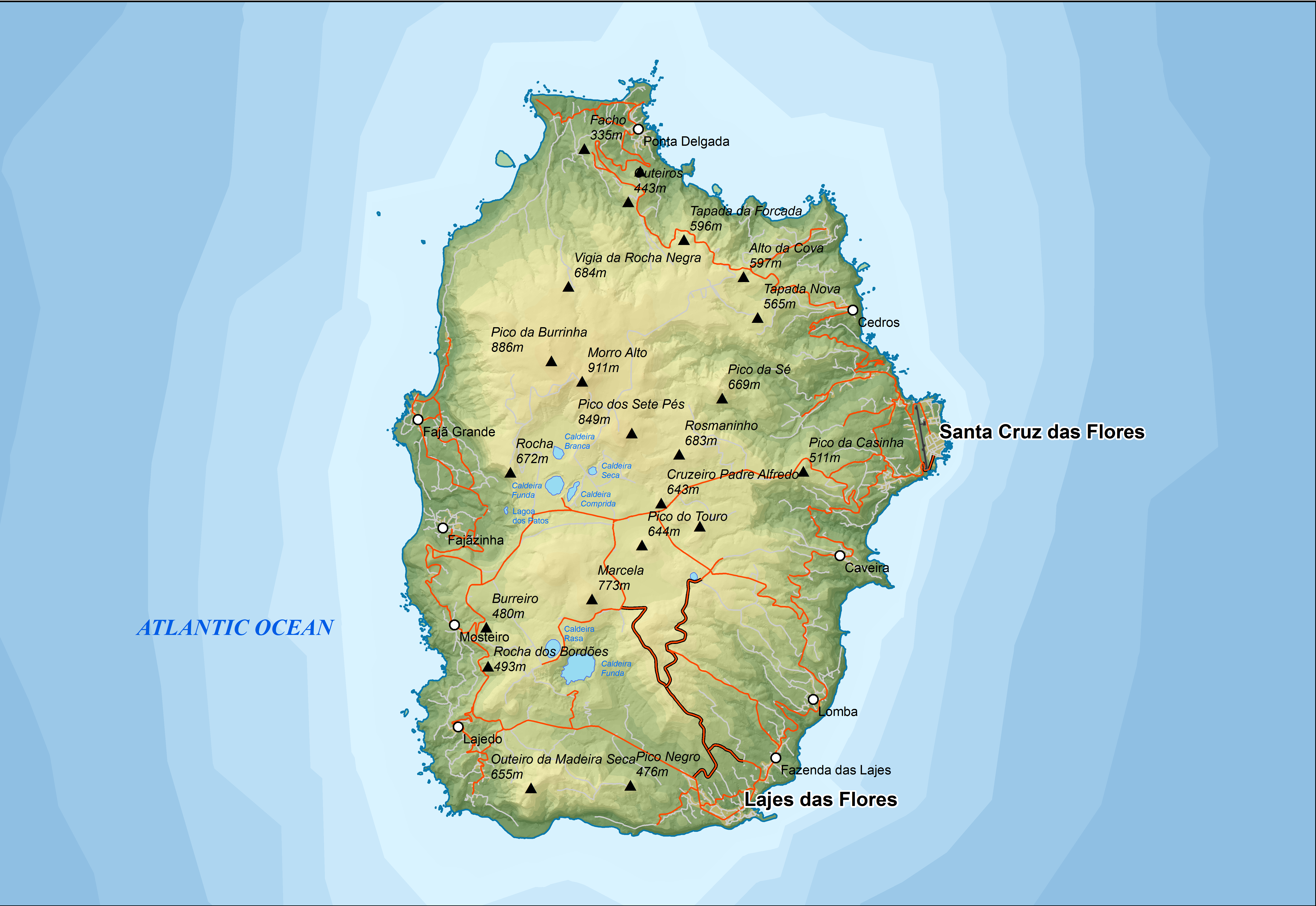
Map of Flores

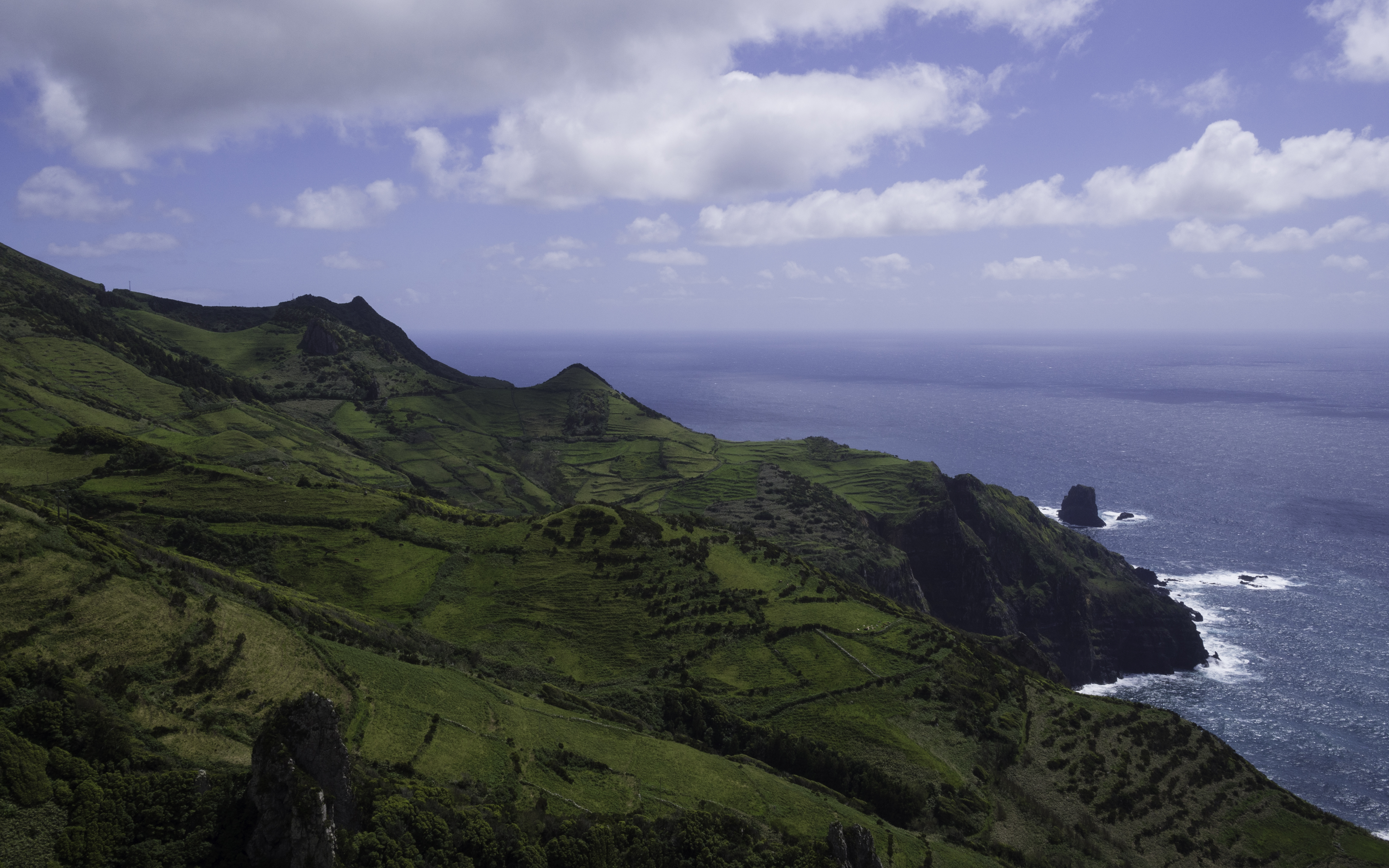
View of the island's rough, green west coast

Flores, along with the island of Corvo, is situated on the North American Continental Plate of the Mid-Atlantic Ridge and belongs to the western group of islands in the Azores archipelago. Geomorphologically, the island is composed of two units:

- The Central Massif, in the central plain, has many maar structures with lake-filled craters in the adjacent lands;
- The Coastal Periphery includes the coastal zones, cliffs, and ancient beaches, as well as the coastal shelf.

The island developed initially from a submarine volcano from the Pleistocene epoch that constructed small calderas and numerous pyroclastic cones. Following a long period of quiescence beginning about 200,000 years ago, several young phreatomagmatic craters and associated lava flows erupted during the Holocene epoch, including two about 3000 years ago. The Funda de Lajes tuff ring, formed about 3150 years ago, accompanied by a lava flow that traveled toward the southeast reach the area of Lajes. The Caldeira Comprida tuff ring in Caldeira Seca (west-central Flores) later, about 2900 years ago, producing a lava flow that traveled towards the region of Fajã Grande.

Azevedo et al. (1986) divides the lavas and deposits into two major volcanic complexes:

- The Basal Volcanic Complex, which includes products and deposits of both submarine and subaerial volcanism, formed by pyroclastic deposits and inter-bedded flows of alkali basalts.
- The Upper Volcanic Complex represents the main sub-aerial activity composed of three main stratigraphic units, including basaltic to trachytic flows with interbedded pyroclastic deposits in the first two layers, and a more recent unit of exclusively pyroclastic deposits.

During the summer, the island is covered with hydrangeas, which have large blue or pink flowers; this is the origin of the island's name (Flores is the Portuguese word for flowers).

The island has deep valleys and high peaks; Morro Alto is the highest place on the island, reaching an altitude of 914 metres, while Pico da Burrinha, Pico dos Sete Pés and Marcela are other peaks on the island. Flores has several inactive volcanoes; Caldeira Funda last erupted in 1200 BCE, and Caldeira Comprida in 950 BCE. In many situations where water collected in volcanic calderas (or caldeiras in Portuguese), lakes formed: there are seven of these lakes on the island. The Águas Quentes are small hot springs of boiling sulfurous water located in Costa do Lajedo. The hike to reach them can be difficult. The Gruta de Enxaréus is an enormous cavern, about 50 metres long and 25 metres wide.

=== Human settlement ===
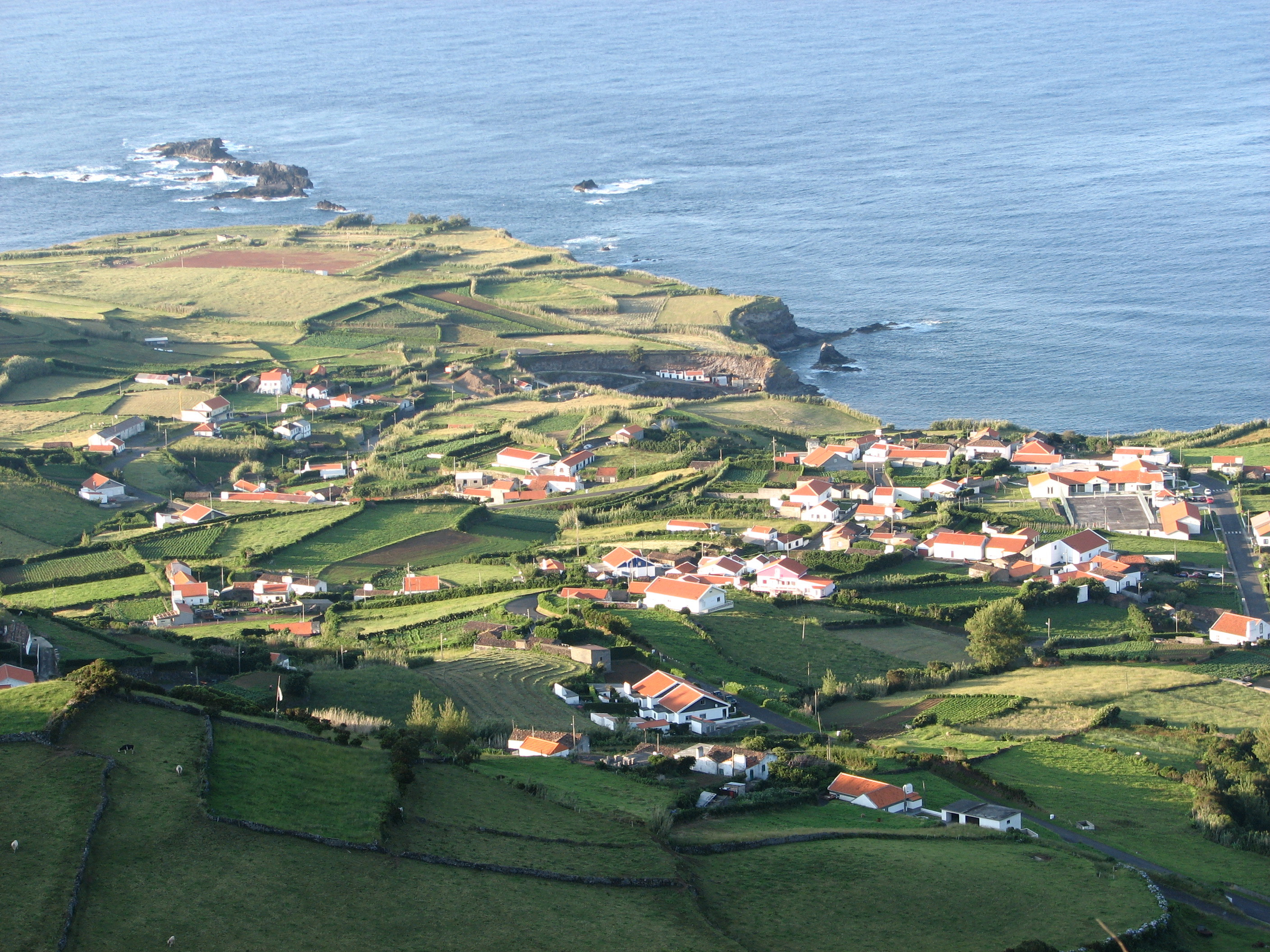
Ponta Delgada, settled in 1571, by Diogo das Chagas, immediately becoming a parish, located in Santa Cruz das Flores

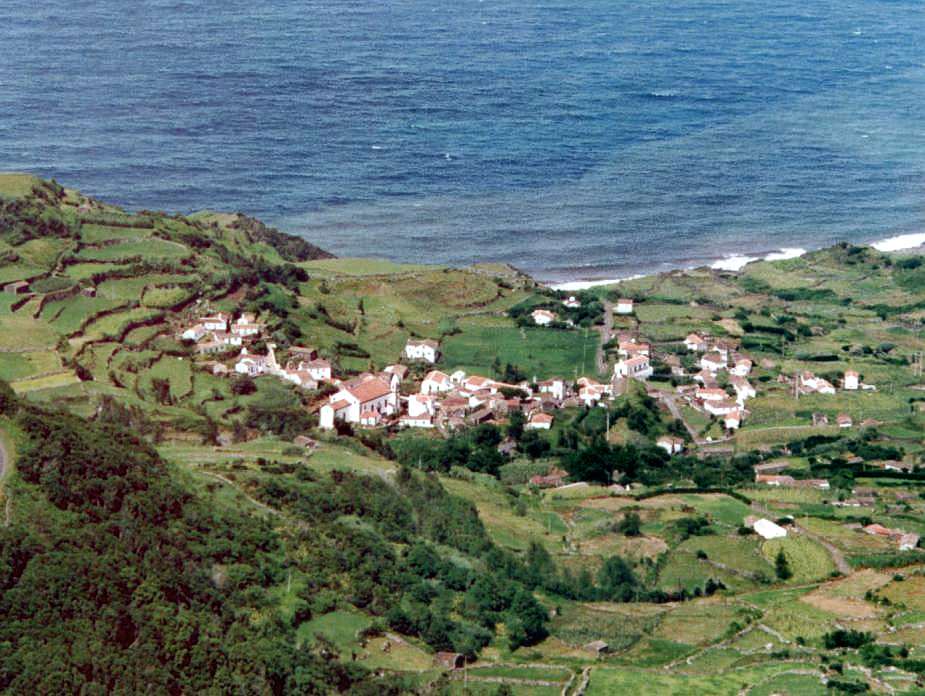
Fajãzinha, located along an alluvial plain fed by five lakes and ravines on the upper plateau of Lajes das Flores

Due to the generally rugged landscape of the island, many of the early settlements developed along the flatter coastal lands. The few settlements that are located in the interior are dotted by small homes or agricultural buildings.

Administratively, the island of Flores is divided into two municipalities (concelhos in Portuguese), which in turn are composed of several civil parishes, with their own civil committees and administrative executives:

- Santa Cruz das Flores, located in the east, has 2,020 inhabitants (2021 census), and includes the island's largest community (Santa Cruz das Flores), a community located on the eastern coast, and where the local airport, as well as the principal governmental services, primary and secondary schools, and regional health centre are located. It comprises the following civil parishes:
  - Caveira, the smallest parish in size, bordering Lajes das Flores, with 76 inhabitants;
  - Cedros, the "middle" parish that straddles the river-valleys of Algoa Bay and historical location of orchards owing to its micro-climate;
  - Ponta Delgada; third-largest community on the island, located along the northern coast;
  - Santa Cruz das Flores; municipal seat, the location of the airport and largest population (with 1,552 inhabitants);
- Lajes das Flores, the southern municipality includes many of the natural landscapes of the island and is inhabited by approximately 1,408 inhabitants (2021 census). The principal parishes are:
  - Fajã Grande, located in the basin and fajã on the western coast, with a population of 220 inhabitants;
  - Fajãzinha, with 71 residents, is located south of Fajã Grande; Fajãzinha is a diminutive of fajã, referring to it being a small agglomeration of homes in the corner of the fajã;
  - Fazenda, literally meaning "commercial goods" or "location where [these] goods are available for sale", it was the last civil parish to be formed (de-annexed from its neighbour in 1919); with 261 people living in an area of 29.5 km²;
  - Lajedo, an agricultural community located 9 km from Lajes, and close to the Rocha dos Bordões, as well as other natural monuments;
  - Lajes das Flores, the seat of the municipal government, located on the southeast coast; largest population center in the municipality;
  - Lomba, location of the island's first chapel, and neighbor of the parish of Lajes. Lomba represents an area bordered by river valleys along the southern coast;
  - Mosteiro, the smallest parish in area and density, with 19 residents, is the second smallest center on the island.

=== Climate ===
Under the Köppen climate classification, Flores Island has a humid subtropical climate (Cfa) that transits into an oceanic climate (Cfb) at higher elevations. Its climate is largely influenced by the warm Gulf Stream and the surrounding ocean, resulting in a narrow temperature range and a wet climate. Winters are very mild and rainy with a February average of 14.5 °C (58.1 °F). Summers are warm to hot with the average temperature in August averaging 26.0 °C (78.8 °F) during the day and 20.3 °C (68.5 °F) during the night. Throughout the year, temperatures rarely exceed 30 °C (86.0 °F) or fall below 5 °C (41.0 °F).

Precipitation is significant throughout the year, although summer months are drier than winter months. There are around 240 days with measurable precipitation. Humidity is constantly high (around 80% at sea level, increasing with altitude).

Climate data for Flores Airport (1991–2020 normals, 1971-2020 extremes, sun hours 1971–2000)
Month	Jan	Feb	Mar	Apr	May	Jun	Jul	Aug	Sep	Oct	Nov	Dec	Year
Record high °C (°F)	21.1 (70.0)	21.0 (69.8)	22.6 (72.7)	22.7 (72.9)	25.3 (77.5)	27.4 (81.3)	29.9 (85.8)	30.5 (86.9)	29.6 (85.3)	27.5 (81.5)	25.0 (77.0)	23.1 (73.6)	30.5 (86.9)
Mean daily maximum °C (°F)	17.1 (62.8)	16.9 (62.4)	17.2 (63.0)	18.2 (64.8)	19.7 (67.5)	22.1 (71.8)	24.9 (76.8)	26.0 (78.8)	24.6 (76.3)	21.8 (71.2)	19.4 (66.9)	17.9 (64.2)	20.5 (68.9)
Daily mean °C (°F)	14.8 (58.6)	14.5 (58.1)	14.8 (58.6)	15.7 (60.3)	17.1 (62.8)	19.4 (66.9)	22.0 (71.6)	23.1 (73.6)	21.9 (71.4)	19.4 (66.9)	17.1 (62.8)	15.6 (60.1)	18.0 (64.3)
Mean daily minimum °C (°F)	12.5 (54.5)	12.0 (53.6)	12.4 (54.3)	13.2 (55.8)	14.6 (58.3)	16.8 (62.2)	19.2 (66.6)	20.3 (68.5)	19.3 (66.7)	17.0 (62.6)	14.9 (58.8)	13.3 (55.9)	15.5 (59.8)
Record low °C (°F)	2.1 (35.8)	4.0 (39.2)	3.4 (38.1)	5.0 (41.0)	7.2 (45.0)	9.2 (48.6)	11.4 (52.5)	12.6 (54.7)	11.1 (52.0)	9.1 (48.4)	6.5 (43.7)	4.0 (39.2)	2.1 (35.8)
Average precipitation mm (inches)	192.0 (7.56)	158.9 (6.26)	165.8 (6.53)	114.1 (4.49)	104.8 (4.13)	95.0 (3.74)	64.9 (2.56)	80.8 (3.18)	115.9 (4.56)	177.6 (6.99)	153.8 (6.06)	217.7 (8.57)	1,641.3 (64.63)
Average precipitation days (≥ 1.0 mm)	17.6	15.5	15.8	13.0	11.3	10.0	7.6	9.9	12.5	16.1	14.6	18.5	162.4
Average relative humidity (%)	80	80	80	80	81	82	81	80	81	79	79	80	80
Mean monthly sunshine hours	73.8	79.8	107.0	129.7	168.4	163.8	205.3	215.2	157.3	117.5	82.3	65.3	1,565.4
Percentage possible sunshine	24	26	28	33	38	37	45	51	42	34	27	22	34
Source 1: Instituto de Meteorologia, (sun hours)
Source 2: Deutscher Wetterdienst (humidity 1921–1950)

== Environment ==
=== Ecoregions/protected areas ===
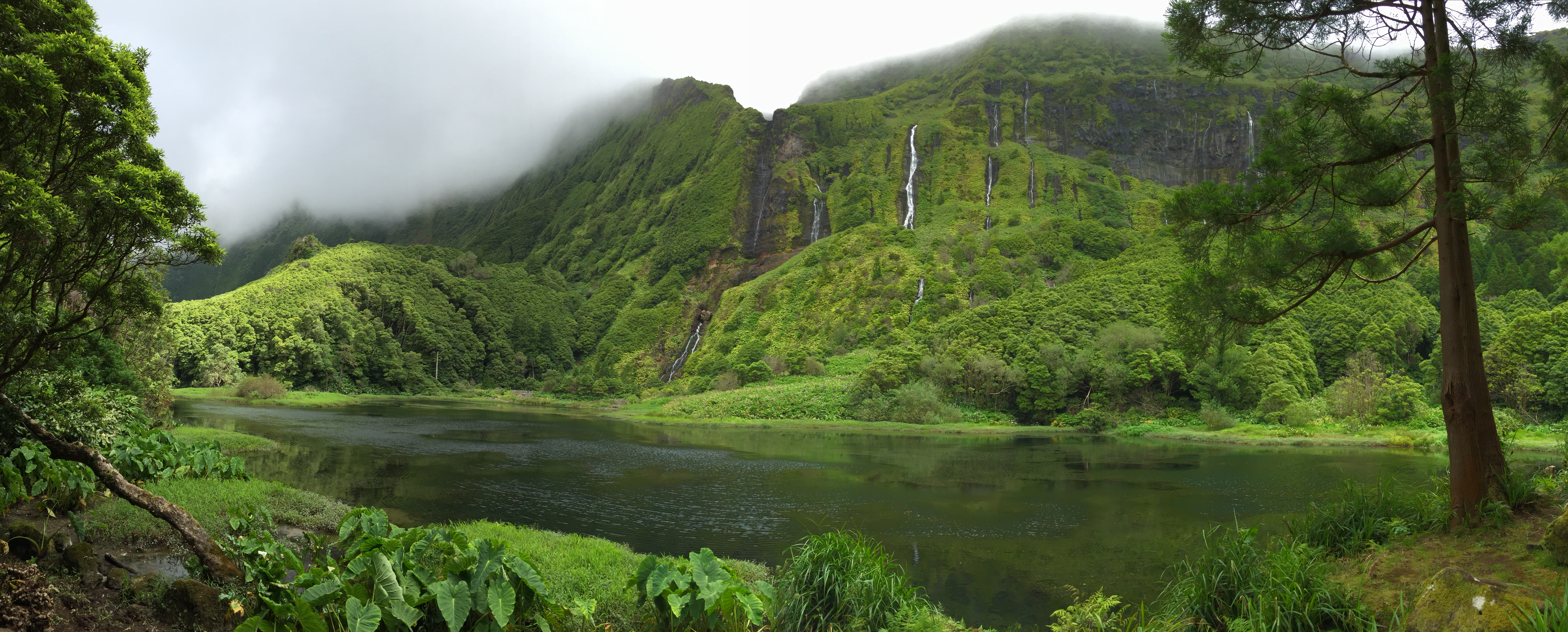

Fajãzinha, in the municipality of Lajes das Flores, is a typical Azorean village that includes ruins of watermills. Nearby are several waterfalls which flow into the Ribeira Grande.

On May 27, 2009, Flores was chosen as one of the several areas to be included on the UNESCO list of World Network of Biosphere Reserves at the Man and the Biosphere Programme meeting held in Jeju, South Korea, along with the islands of Graciosa and Corvo. The program targets the ecological, social and economic dimensions of biodiversity loss and the reduction of this loss. It uses its World Network of Biosphere Reserves as vehicles for knowledge sharing, research and monitoring, education and training, and participatory decision-making with local communities.

On 13 October 2010, the Regional Secretary for Environment and Ocean (Portuguese: Secretaria Regional do Ambiente e Mar) declared that the Rocha dos Bordões would be given a regional monument designation as part of an overall plan of integrating the Flores Nature Park (Portuguese: Parque Natural da Ilha das Flores). The park is formed from the central plateau, descends in the northern coast and along the southern coast from Morro Alto, including the many lakes, ending at the Rocha dos Bordões. In the government's decision, the regional secretary included an area "especially rich in peat and humid zone vegetation" together with the geological formation of the Rocha dos Bordões.

=== Important Bird Area ===
The island of Flores and the neighbouring Corvo Island, along with the surrounding waters, form the 210,400 ha Corvo and Flores Important Bird Area (IBA), designated as such by BirdLife International because it provides feeding and breeding sites for populations of Cory's, little and Manx shearwaters, as well as roseate and common terns and, possibly, Madeiran storm petrels.

== Economy ==
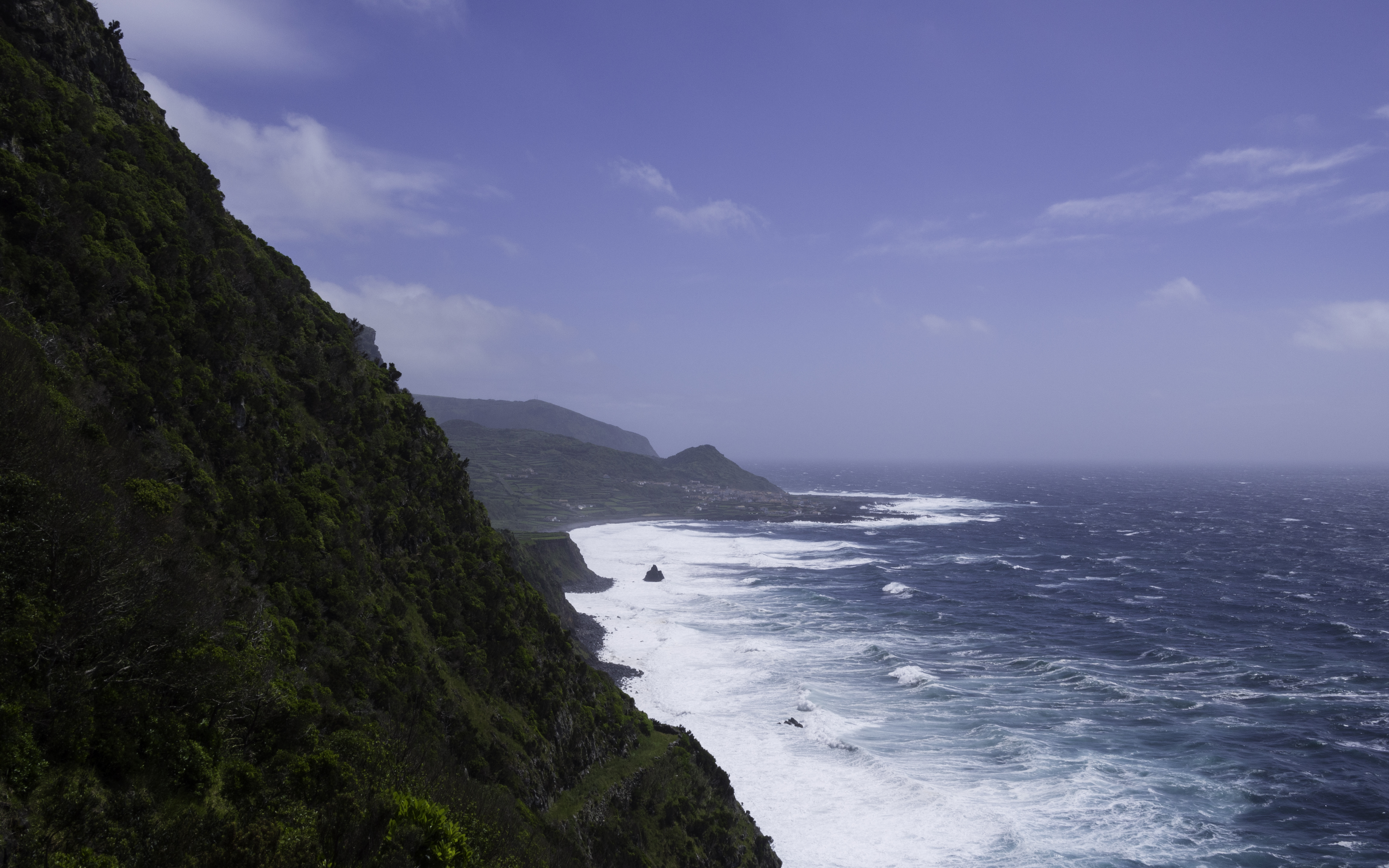
Flores, Portugal

The economy of the island is mainly agricultural, with taro and grain cultivation the principal activities. Due to the early settlers being from northern Portugal, the island's houses and streets resemble those found there. Portugal has a military agreement with France permitting France to have a base in the region. Santa Cruz das Flores houses the only airport on the island. While to the south of the village commercial fishermen operate out of the port and the ferry to Corvo Island is also based at Santa Cruz, the island's primary commercial port is located in Lajes das Flores.

== Transport ==
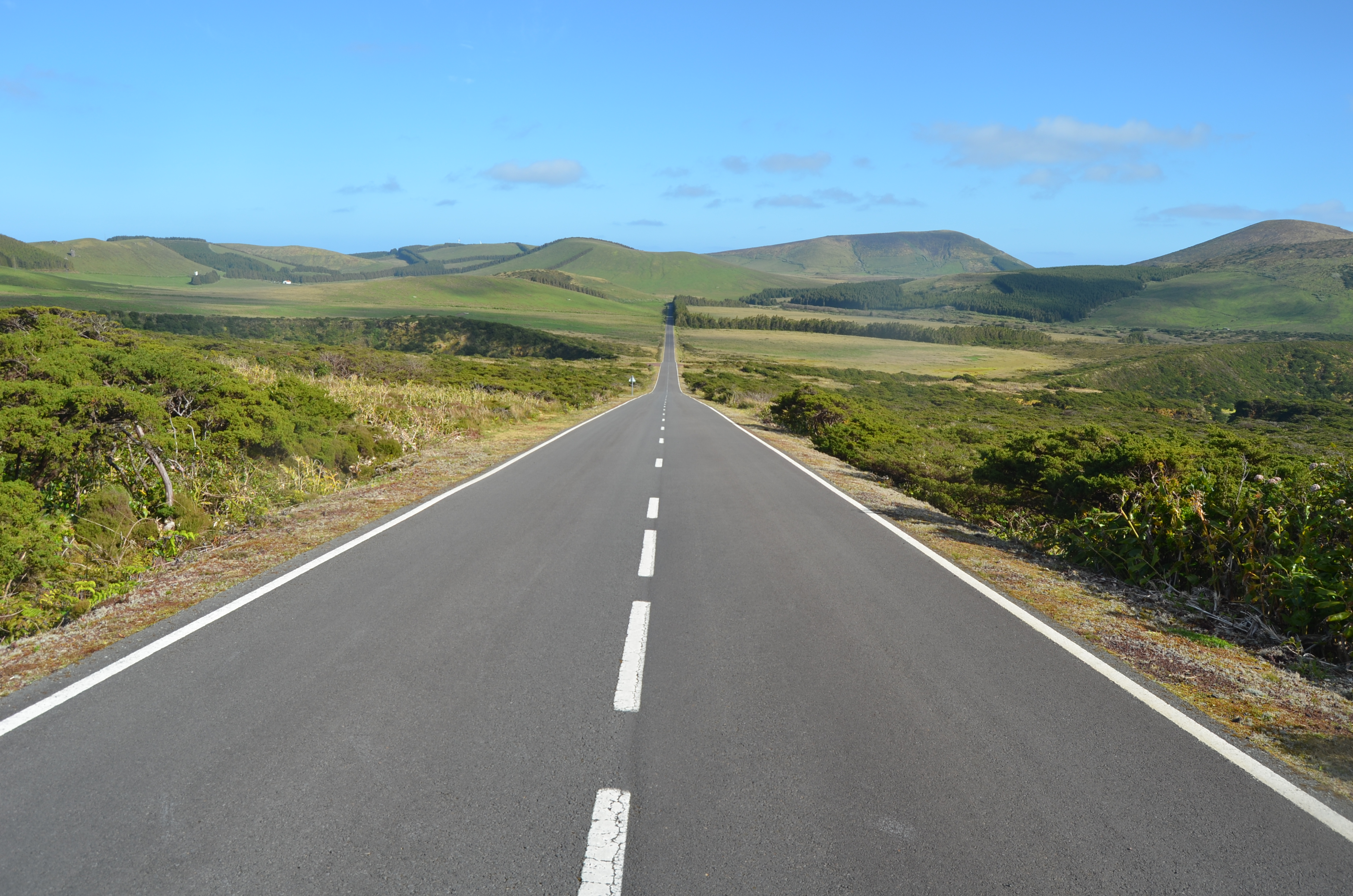
Estradas Nacionais in Flores, Portugal

The island is serviced by the Flores Airport (IATA: FLW, ICAO: LPFL), a regional airport operated by ANA – Aeroportos de Portugal, and located in the centre of the parish of Santa Cruz das Flores. The airport is unique in dividing the parish in two: an area along the coast, separated by the airport, from the remaining residential homes and businesses along Monte and Pau Pique.

On 26 August 2012, the Regional Secretary for Science, Technology, and Equipment oversaw the requalification of 17 kilometres (11 mi) of regional roadways on the island. The public works were intended to upgrade many of the island's roads, considered the worst network in the Azores during the late part of the 20th century. An initial investment of 22 million euros had recuperated 77 kilometres (48 mi) on the island prior to this, and 11 kilometres (6.8 mi) of roadways were proposed to complete the improvements to the region.

== Culture ==
In addition to the traditional meat and fish dishes that are popularly Azorean, the island's own dishes include: Papa Grossa, Sopa de Agrião, Cozido de Porco, Molhos de Dobrada, Inhames com Linguiça and Feijões com Cabeça de Porco, as well as a local cheese and creamy butter. The fishery is also the base of seafood dishes such as Caldeirada de Congro, Bonito Assado no Forno, and Pasteis de Ervas Marinhas, in addition to Atlantic lobster, cavacos, crab, limpet and barnacles.

== Notable citizens ==
- Diogo das Chagas (ca.1584 in Santa Cruz das Flores – ca.1661 in Angra do Heroísmo) was a Portuguese Franciscan friar and historian.
- José António Camões (Fajãzinha, 1777 – Ponta Delgada, 1827), priest, poet, historian, and author of various works of satire, including his heroic satire O Testamento de D. Burro, Pai dos Asnos, that poked fun at his critics, for their class-based antagonisms towards his illegitimacy. He was accused of damaging the reputation of the church, and brought before the inquisition, but absolved: yet, his antagonists had already destroyed his career, forcing him to live in disgrace off handouts from friends or church services, until his death.

== See also ==
- List of volcanoes in Azores
