= Fazenda (Lajes das Flores) =

- Civil parish
- Location in the Azores Fazenda (Flores Island (Azores))
- Coordinates: 39°23′20″N 31°9′59″W
- Country: Portugal
- Auton. region: Azores
- Island: Flores
- Municipality: Lajes das Flores
- Established: Civil parish: c.1919

Area
  - Total: 9.47 km^{2} (3.66 sq mi)
- Elevation: 119 m (390 ft)

Population (2021)
  - Total: 261
  - Density: 27.6/km^{2} (71.4/sq mi)
- Time zone: UTC−01:00 (AZOT)
  - Summer (DST): UTC+00:00 (AZOST)
- Postal code: 9960-220
- Area code: 292
- Patron: Senhor Santo Cristo
- Website: www.cmlajesflores.com

Fazenda (pronounced [fɐ.ˈzẽ.dɐ]) is a civil parish in the municipality of Lajes das Flores, on the island of Flores, in the Portuguese archipelago of the Azores. The population in 2021 was 261, in an area of 9.47 square kilometres (3.66 mi^{2}). This parish is the youngest in the municipality, having been de-annexed from the parish of Lajes das Flores in 1919.

== History ==
The first settlements In this region occurred In the zone called Eirinha Velha during the 16th Century. Few historians would refer to the area of Fazenda, until Father José António Camões elaborated on the island's; from Ribeira Funda, he would recount:

"In about 55 arms-lengths, the river runs to the sea along a cliff called Fazenda...continuing to the south-southeast, In the same bay, is a lowland called Cherne. A short distance from this lowland is a small point called Ponta da Fazenda".

Later, Father Camões would note that the zone was occupied by 72 homes, 395 inhabitants in total (198 men to 197 women). He would go on to describe the local industry, noting how the men were "hearty, robust and jovial" and responsible for the production of best roof-tiles on the island.

Albeit only administratively autonomous in 1919, it was religiously independent of Lajes das Flores in 1904. At that time, Senator André de Freitas had unsuccessfully attempted to promote the village to civil parish status. Similarly, and much later, Senator Machado Serpa had a similar idea; on December 9, 1919, organic law 915 was promulgated creating the civil parish of Fazenda. On 10 November 1959, Bishop D. Manuel Afonso de Carvalho established Fazenda as a parochial church congregation with all the rights under Canonical Law.

During the 1940s, a small whaling industry was operated by Fazendense Francisco Nunes Azevedo.

== Geography ==
Fazenda is administrative division of Lajes das Flores, and located to the north and northeast of the municipal seat. It extends from the eastern coast where it slopes along a north-northwest to south-southeast orientation to the center of the island. The settlements in this parish area oriented along the Regional Road connecting them to the parishes of Lomba (to the north) and Lajes das Flores (to the south). The parish contains the localities Calvário, Barreira Vermelha, Eiras and Feital.

== Economy ==
Fazenda has been characterized for its fertile soils, and the local population is primarily involved In agriculture and animal husbandry associated with the dairy industry. The parish's experience with cooperativism started on 4 April 1919, with the establishment of the Fructuária de Produção de Lacticínios da Freguesia do Senhor Santo Cristo dos Milagres da Fazenda, later renamed the Cooperativa Agrícola Fructuária de Produção de Lacticínios Senhor Santo Cristo by its founder, Father José Furtado Mota. In 1950, the co-operative's constitution was amended (29 November) and elaborated, becoming known As the Cooperativa Agrícola de Lacticínios do Senhor Santo Cristo, SCARL, under new directors Fernando Pereira Gomes, Francisco de Freitas Silva and Fernando Gomes Trigueiro. In 1968, the cooperative adapted new technologies and processes to produce a variant on the São Jorge cheese, while reducing the production of its local butter (At its only factory In Ribeirinha). At the time it was considered pioneering, and later duplicated by other dairy producers on the island. Later, In order to secure a greater portion of the export market, along with other branches on the island, the cooperative formed the União de Cooperativas da Ilha das Flores.

== Architecture ==
=== Civic ===
- Bridge of Riberia da Fazenda (Portuguese: Ponte sobre a Ribeira da Fazenda)
- Fountain of Rua da Chamorra (Portuguese: Chafariz da Rua da Chamorra)
- Fountains of Fazenda (Portuguese: Chafariz da Fazenda)
- Residences Rua da Chamorra (Portuguese: Casas de habitação Rua da Chamorra)
- Residences Rua Senador Machado Serpa (Portuguese: Casas com Forno Suspenso, Rua Senador Machado Serpa)
- Watermill of the King (Portuguese: Moinho do Rei)

=== Religious ===
- Church of Senhor Santo Cristo dos Milagres (Portuguese: Igreja Paroquial de Fazenda/Igreja do Senhor Santo Cristo dos Milagres)
- Império of the Divine Holy Spirit of Lajes (Portuguese: Império da Fazenda das Lajes)
