= Lajedo =

Lajedo may refer to the following places:

- Lajedo, Cape Verde, Santo Antão, Cape Verde
- Lajedo, Pernambuco, Brazil
- Lajedo do Tabocal, Bahia, Brazil
- Lajedo (Lajes das Flores), a civil parish in the municipality of Lajes das Flores, Azores, Portugal
