= Caveira =

Caveira is Portuguese for "skull", but may refer to:

- Caveira (parish), a civil parish in Portugal
- Caveira (Rainbow Six Siege), a fictional Brazilian special operator in Tom Clancy's Rainbow Six Siege
