= Church of Santíssima Trindade (Mosteiro) =

- Church of the Holy Trinity
- Igreja da Santíssima Trindade
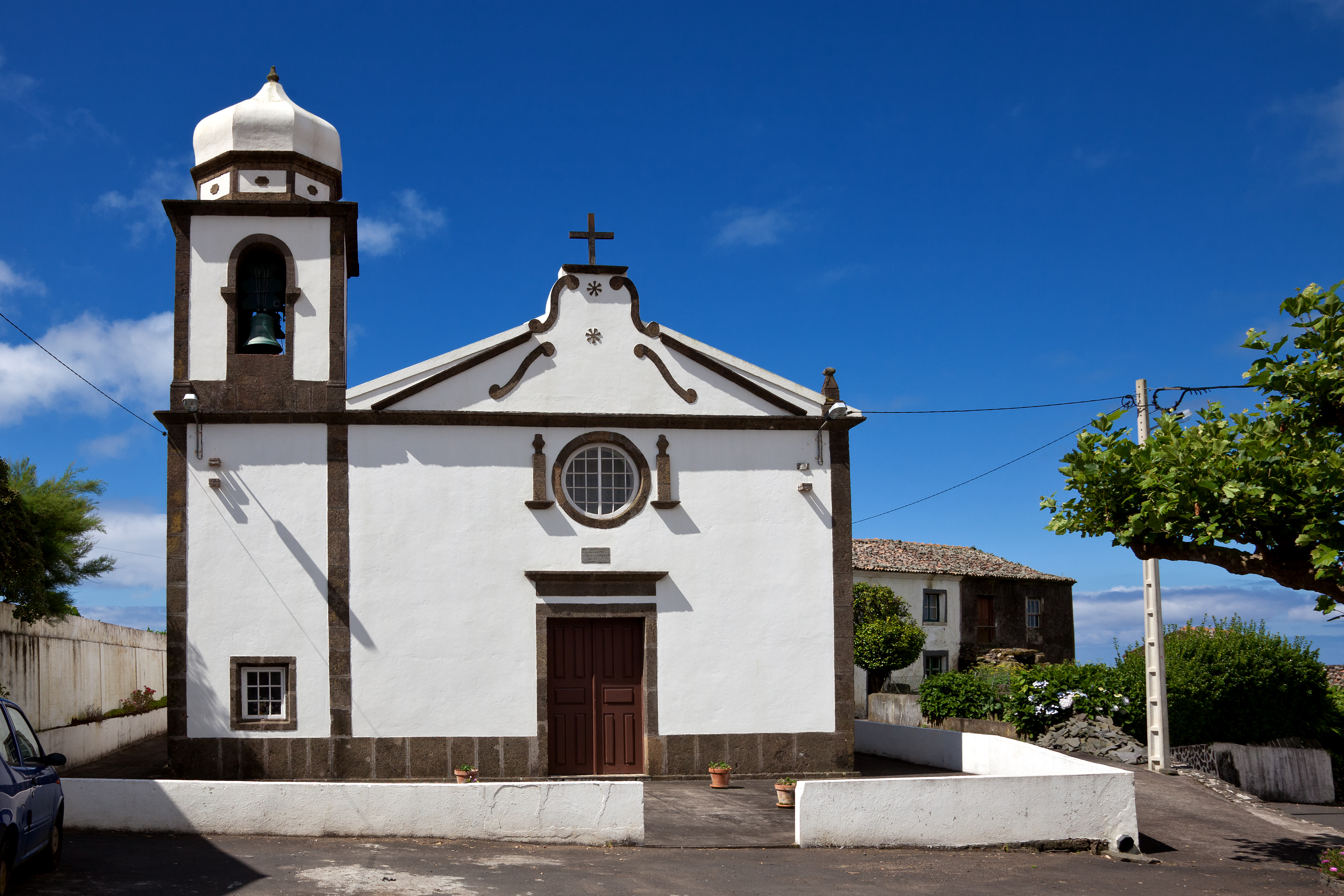
- The front facade of the Revivalist church of Mosteiro
- Church of Santíssima Trindade
- 39°24′47.2″N 31°15′4.8″W
- Location: Flores, Western, Azores
- Country: Portugal
- Denomination: Roman Catholic

Architecture
- Style: Revivalist

Administration
- Diocese: Diocese of Angra

The Church of Santíssima Trindade (Portuguese: Igreja Paroquial de Mosteiro/Igreja da Santíssima Trindade) is an 18th-century church located in the freguesia (civil parish) of Mosteiro in the municipality of Lajes das Flores, on the Portuguese island of Flores, in the archipelago of the Azores.

== History ==
According to the inscription over the main portico, the church dates from 1846, the year António de Freitas (an ex-seminarian born in Fajãzinha, returned from Macau, where he had made his fortune in the traffic of opium and child slavery. In his gratitude to God for saving his fortune ("as a sign of his recognition for the safety of all his possessions"), he decided to finance the construction of a new church, to the invocation of the Holy Trinity, in Mosteiro.

The church was erected in an isolated urban area inserted into a level area and courtyard. In front of the church is the Império do Espírito Santo, that dates from 1879.

The first burial in the new churchyard occurred on 8 October 1847.

On 23 October 1850, by royal decree, Queen D. Maria II elevated Mosteiro administratively, forming (along with locality of Caldeira) the new parish of Mosteiro, that substituted the former Mosteiros that dominated until then. It was later supported by the elevation of the religious parish to the status of ecclesiastical parish on 18 November in the same year, by friar D. Estêvão de Jesus Maria, then bishop of Angra.

From 1893 to 1896, the parish priest was Francisco Nunes da Rosa, whose Pastorais do Mosteiro (1904) is one of the first works of Azorean literature.

From 1896 to 1915, the old chapel in the parochial church was expanded, under the initiative of Father Caetano Bernardo de Sousa, then the parish priest. The collateral retables were designed and sculpted by Father Guilherme, priest for Mosteiro and Fazenda das Lajes.

Between 18 November 1895 and 18 January 1898, the parish was integrated into the municipality of Santa Cruz das Flores, when the municipality of Lajes was extinguished.

== Architecture ==
The single-nave church longitudinally extends to the presbytery, which is narrower, and addorsed by lateral bell tower and sacristy, plastered and painted while, while covered in ceiling tile. The principal facade with embrasure, pilaster cornerstones, terminates in a central frontispiece delimited by curvilinear forms and surmounted by stone cross. In the centre is the rectangular, framed doorway surmounted by frieze and cornices, topped by an inscription and a large circular oculus flanked by stone sculptures in the form of candles. The entranceway inscription includes:

DA SANTÍSSIMA TRINDADE FEITA NO ANNO DE 1846
Of the Holy Trinity built in the year 1846

The tympanum is decorated by two scrolls and stars, also from sculpted stone. The belltower, with pilaster cornerstones, has two storeys, separated by cornices, with a rectangular window at the lower level (lighting the old baptistery) and topped by rounded belfry with three bells. The tower is decorated with a bulbous cupola and pinnacles on each corner, while it is accessed from the rear through a door located at the level of the choir loft, preceded by an exterior staircase, constructed over washrooms.

The interior, plastered and painted in white, includes a wooden choir loft, supported by three stone cormels, superseded by a narrow staircase. To the side of the access to the baptistery is a marble inscription:

À MEMÓRIA DE MARIA LUÍSA RODRIGUES JORGE QUE COSTEOU UM GRANDE RESTAURO DESTA IGREJA E LEGOU, NO SEU TESTAMENTO, AVULTADA HERANÇA A ESTA PARÓQUIA. HOMENAGEM DE GRATIDÃO DOS SEUS CONTERRÂNEOS.
In memory of Maria Luísa Rodrigues Jorge who costed the great restoration of the church and connected, in her testament, great inheritance to this parish. Homage in gratitude of her contemporaries.

There are doors in the lateral walls, with a smaller door leading to the sacristy. The triumphal arch is supported by pilasters flanked by two lateral retables at angles, decorated in polychromatic and gilded woods. The ceiling is covered in painted wood forming panels.
