= Church of Nossa Senhora dos Milagres (Lajedo) =

- Church of Our Lady of Miracles
- Igreja da Nossa Senhora dos Milagres
- Church of Nossa Senhora dos Milagres
- 39°23′32.8″N 31°14′54.4″W
- Location: Flores, Western, Azores
- Country: Portugal
- Denomination: Roman Catholic

Architecture
- Style: Revivalist

Administration
- Diocese: Diocese of Angra

The Church of Nossa Senhora dos Milagres (Portuguese: Igreja Paroquial de Lajedo/Igreja de Nossa Senhora dos Milagres) is an 18th-century church located in the civil parish of Lajedo in the municipality of Lajes das Flores, in the Portuguese island of Flores, in the archipelago of the Azores.

== History ==
The construction of this parochial church was due to the contributions of José Francisco Mendonça in 1771.

The initiative of constructing the church resulted in the 19 December 1823 creation of the parish of Lajedo, by royal charter of King D. John VI. The new parish was delimited by the Ribeira da Lapa, Rebentão and Rocha Alta, and a rector assigned to the curia supported by four bushels and 51 alqueires of wheat, in addition to 8$000 réis, in addition to a stipend of one moio and 13$000 réis for hosts and wine, to be supplemented by the island treasury.

Work on restoration to the church was begun in 1868 and concluded in 1876. Its conclusion coincided with the pastoral visit of Bishop of Angra, D. João Maria Pereira de Amaral e Pimentel. In order to accomplish this task, some of the church's gold decorations were sold in order to finance the plastering and construction of the retable.

== Architecture ==
The centrally located church is found in Campanário, situated on a level platform, forming a partially landscaped courtyard. The rear of the churchyard is oriented to the rear of several homes, that show evidence of semi-circular and polygonal chimneys and ovens.

It consists of a unique nave and narrower presbytery, with bell tower and sacristy. The principal facade includes central door and two windows at the height of the high-choir. Between the two windows is a sculpted plaque:

REEDIFICADA PELO / PADRE FRANCISCO / LUIZ DE FREITAS / HENRIQUES / ~1868~
Reconstructed by / Father Francisco / Luiz de Freitas / Henriques / 1868

The three sections have double lintel surmounted by cornice, and the facade is delimited by socle, with cornerstones and cornice that continue to the belltower and circle the building. Over the cornice is a frontispiece that accompany the slope of the ceiling. The vertical apex of the frontispiece has a trapezoidal form, defined by two scrolls that support a horizontal section of cornice surmounted by cross with the initials JHS. In the tympanum is a circular oculus framing a 45º square (intersected by cornice) and flanked by two small squares. Asymmetrical, the right part of the facade is surmounted by a pinnacle. The rectangular bell tower, on the left part of the church is divided into two levels (both limited by stonework) by the continuation of the cornice from along the facade. The taller lower level has a window that illuminated the baptistery, while the upper register is decorated with cornice and topped by the archways of the belfry. The tower is surmounted by an octagonal cupola (with cornices and decorative elements) in four sections decorated with pinnacle. Access to the tower is made from the high-choir along an exterior staircase to a door in the rear of the tower.

The principal entrance is preceded by a protect windbreak of wood, over which is located the concave high-choir, with guardrails and balustrade of wood. To the left of the entrance is a wood grade that provides access to the baptistry (the ground floor of the belltower). To the right of this doorway is a plaque with the inscription:

HOMENAGEM / AO REVO. SR. PE. / JOSÉ FURTADO MOTA, / NO 50º ANIVERSÁRIO / DA SUA ENTRADA / NESTA PARÓQUIA EM 1909, / ONDE REALIZOU VÁRIOS E / IMPORTANTES MELHORAMENTOS
Homage / to Reverend Sir Father / José Furtado Mota / on the 50th Anniversary / of his entry / to this parish in 1909 / where he realized various and / important improvements

On each of the walls of the nave, in the centre, is a door to the exterior, flanked by two high windows. Opposite the epistole between the last window and the triumphal arch, is a pulpit over stone and corbel. The archway accesses the altar and chancel with complimentary doors and windows on each wall (one to the sacristy and one to the exterior), and the structure is flanked by two retables oriented on 45º angles. At the end of altar is a retable that includes cartouche with a crown and the inscription:

NOSSA SENHORA DOS MILAGRES
Our Lady of Miracles

The retables and pulpit guardrail are in painted Revivalist woodwork. The frames of the interior sections, the triumphal arch, the pulpit and cornice are painted to imitate granite. The nav and presbytery have wooden ceilings painted to simulate a vaulted ceiling.
