= Fajã de Lopo Vaz =

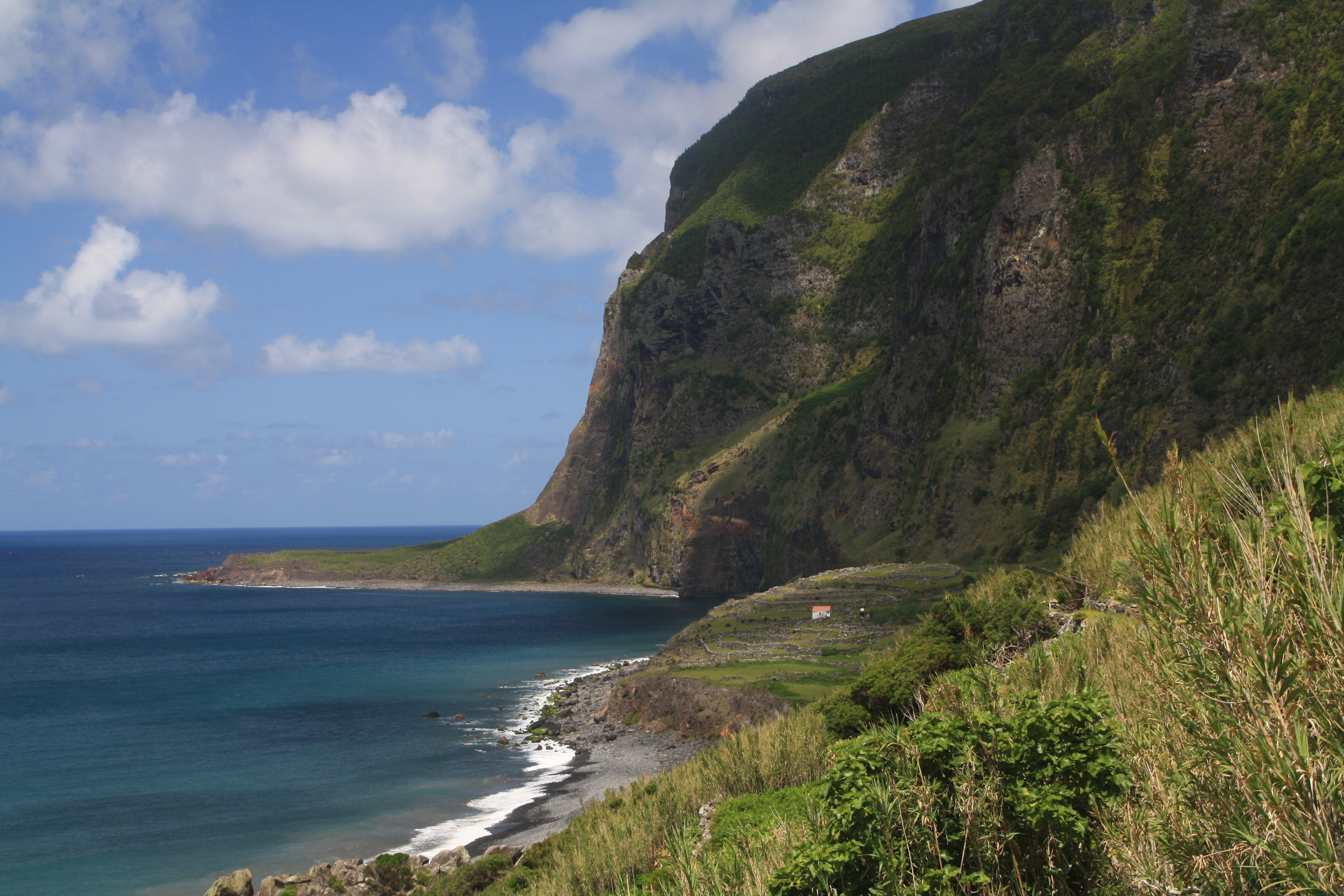
- A view from the base of the fajã showing minor building and hedged parcels.
- Interactive map of Fajã de Lopo Vaz
- Location: Lajes, Flores, Western, Azores, Portugal
- Coordinates: 39°22′32″N 31°12′39″W
- Named for: Lopo Vaz
- Visitors: Accessible by foot, yet restricted during periods of in-climate weather
- Geographic detail from Portuguese Army map

The Fajã de Lopo Vaz is a permanent debris field, built from the collapsing cliffs on the southern coast of the civil parish of Lajes, municipality of the same name, island of Flores, in the Portuguese archipelago of the Azores. It may have been one of the first points of settlement on the island, owing to its name, which is associated with one of the first settlers.

== History ==
Sometime between 1500 and 1528, during the administration of João da Fonseca, the 5th donatary-captain of Flores and Corvo, settlers began arriving on the island of flores, including Lopo Vaz and Antão Vaz, relatives who began small settlements. It is unclear whether the fajã was the result of these settlers, or their name were assigned to the geological feature. What is known, is that due to its isolation, early settlers were self-sufficient since access to the fajã was made difficult by only existing pedestrian trails. Today, a trail still connects the site to the main roadway in Lajes, but no motor vehicles can reach the fajã. A potable spring, located in the fajã, was likely to have affected sustaining settlement by colonists, providing drinking water and a source for irrigating their crops, in particular taro.

This fajã is still one of the few locations on the island of Flores where wild goats exist, although their origin is unknown; speculation does exist that they were either descendants of early animals abandoned on the island to "populate" the lands for settlement or domesticated animals who were left to graze throughout the centuries.

== Geography ==
It is a lowland platform, alongside the sea with a shoreline forming small black sand beaches and basalt rocky coastlines of varying dimensions. It geological form developed from the lava fields and landslides caused by erosion from the high cliffs, above which are the peaks of Pico Negro and Pico do Laurenzo. These conditions, along with cliffs and maritime coastline has resulted in the area being designated as a Special Protection Zone (ZPE) due to its isolation, geomorphology and unique ecosystem. The ZPE includes not only portions of the fajã platform but also the cliffs and shoreline.

Terrestrial access to the fajã begins normally at the overlook of Fajã de Lopo Vaz, and descends the flanks and cliffs along dirt roads, paved furrows and stairs of basalt stone established and maintained by settlers and local inhabitants of the region.

Owing to the incline and cliff faces on the descent, the pedestrian trail is insecure frequently, with rock dislodging from the cliffs and plummeting to the debris field.

The fajã, therefore, is practically uninhabited, covered in pasture-lands and local banana orchards cultivated by some property-owners. This isolation also makes it ideal for ornithology, the study of natural flora and fauna of Macaronesia or for the adventurous wishing to discover deserted beaches, quiet or calm.

One of the unusual residents that frequently appear along the coastline are hammerhead sharks, which is rare to the other inlets and bays of the island and archipelago.

== See also ==
- List of fajãs in the Azores
