= Church of Benditas Almas (Caveira) =

Coordinates: 39.4319588°N 31.1516503°W

- Church of the Blessed Souls
- Igreja das Bendistas Almas
- Church of Benditas Almas
- Location: Flores, Western, Azores
- Country: Portugal
- Denomination: Roman Catholic

Architecture
- Style: Revivalist

Administration
- Diocese: Diocese of Angra

The Church of Benditas Almas (Portuguese: Igreja Paroquial de Caveira/Igreja de Nossa Senhora do Livramento/Igreja das Benditas Almas) is a 19th-century church located in the civil parish of Caveira in the municipality of Santa Cruz das Flores, in the Portuguese island of Flores, in the archipelago of the Azores.

== History ==
The beginnings of the church date back to 1767, to a small temple built by José António de Sousa Bettencourt, to the invocation of the Blessed Souls (Portuguese: Benditas Almas) in the place today occupied by the parish cemetery; a temple 12 metres (39 ft) long and 4.3 metres (14 ft) wide. The land that came to be the church was then the property of João António de Bettencourt, a descendant of its founder, and was it a reasonable state.

On 19 December 1823, by regal charter, King D. John VI, elevated the locality to the status of parish, by request of rector of the neighbouring parish of Lomba, Father José Joaquim de Almeida.

Beginning on 11 August 1835, the parish council and priest made a formal request to the office of the vacated bishopric of Angra, to change its patronage to that of Our Lady of Deliverance (Portuguese: Nossa Senhora do Livramento). This was, as they alleged, because the feast day of Beneditas Almas were those days used for funeral rites, and therefore inappropriate for celebrations. The request was denied.

By 1867, an inventory of religious buildings found the church in an almost state of ruin. This was also confirmed in a report by the Civil Governor for the District of Horta, António José Vieira Santa Rita, who considered it lamentable the degree to which the spaces had been conserved. Beginning that year, work began on the construction of the actual church, to the invocation of the Blessed Souls. But, the first stone was only laid on 13 June 1870. The construction was slow and difficult, with much of the work completed through parish donations and from Azorean emigres in the United States, among them the Viscount of Silva Figueira. The church was inaugurated on 11 September 1880.

== Architecture ==
The church is implanted in the centre of the agglomeration known locally as Caveira de Cima, along the roadway connecting other arterials, over an elevated platform above the road.

The rectangular church comprises a nave with belltower and presbytery, with a sacristy and annex addorsed to the main body, covered in tiled roof. The principal facade is framed by stonework socles, cornerstones and cornices that encircle the structure over the tower and chapel. Above the cornice is frontispiece divided in three, consisting of a central section decorated by star-shaped oculus flanked by two small stars framed by circumference. At its apex is a cross over rectangular base. The axial doorway with double lintel and cornice is surmounted by a guillotine window at the level of the high-choir. This window, also with double lintel and cornice, have prolong jambs and is decorated in scrolls over the doorway. Above the window cornice are two pinnacles, and a small rosetta framed by circumference

To the left of the facade is located a rectangular bell tower, divided into levels by cornices that encircle the building. At the edge of the frontispiece, is a diamond frame, at the level of the high-choir, while at the belfry there are three faces with rounded archways. The bell tower is also decorated by cornice and surmounted by a bulbous cupola. Access to the belltower and upper body is made from an exterior staircase. The lateral doorways have cornices are loose from the lintels, while overhead there are complementary windows. Each of these have cornices surmounted by pinnacles with central rosetta in relief.

The nave's portico is protected by a wooden windbreak in the interior, that supports the rectangular high-choir (also in wood) with guardrails and balustrade. Six corbels support the structure along each wall. The wall opposite the epistole, at ground floor, has a door that leads to the baptistry situated under the bell tower, and covered in vaulted ceiling. The entirety of the interior is plastered and painted in white. Along the left wall is a pulpit over corbel and with wooden balustrade. To the left of the triumphal archway is a doorway that provides access to the sacristy. Both the pulpit and sacristy doors are decorated within cornices. In the sacristy, to the left of the door connecting it to the nave is a steep staircase to the pulpit protected by wooden balustrade, with a small storage area below it. In the main altar there a doorway to storage and windows on either wall, while the space is dominated by a gilded and polychromatic retable in an eclectic Revivalist style. The ceiling of the nave is covered in wood formed to imitate a vaulted ceiling over cornices.
