= Church of Nossa Senhora do Rosário (Lajes) =

- Church of Our Lady of the Rosary
- Igreja da Nossa Senhora do Rosário
- Church of Nossa Senhora do Rosário
- 39°22′41.7″N 31°10′27.3″W
- Location: Flores, Western, Azores
- Country: Portugal
- Denomination: Roman Catholic

History
- Dedication: Virgin Mary

Architecture
- Style: Revivalist

Administration
- Diocese: Diocese of Angra

The Church of Nossa Senhora do Rosário (Portuguese: Igreja Paroquial de Lajes das Flores/Igreja de Nossa Senhora do Rosário) is an 18th-century church located in the civil parish of Lajes in the municipality of Lajes das Flores, in the Portuguese island of Flores, in the archipelago of the Azores.

== History ==
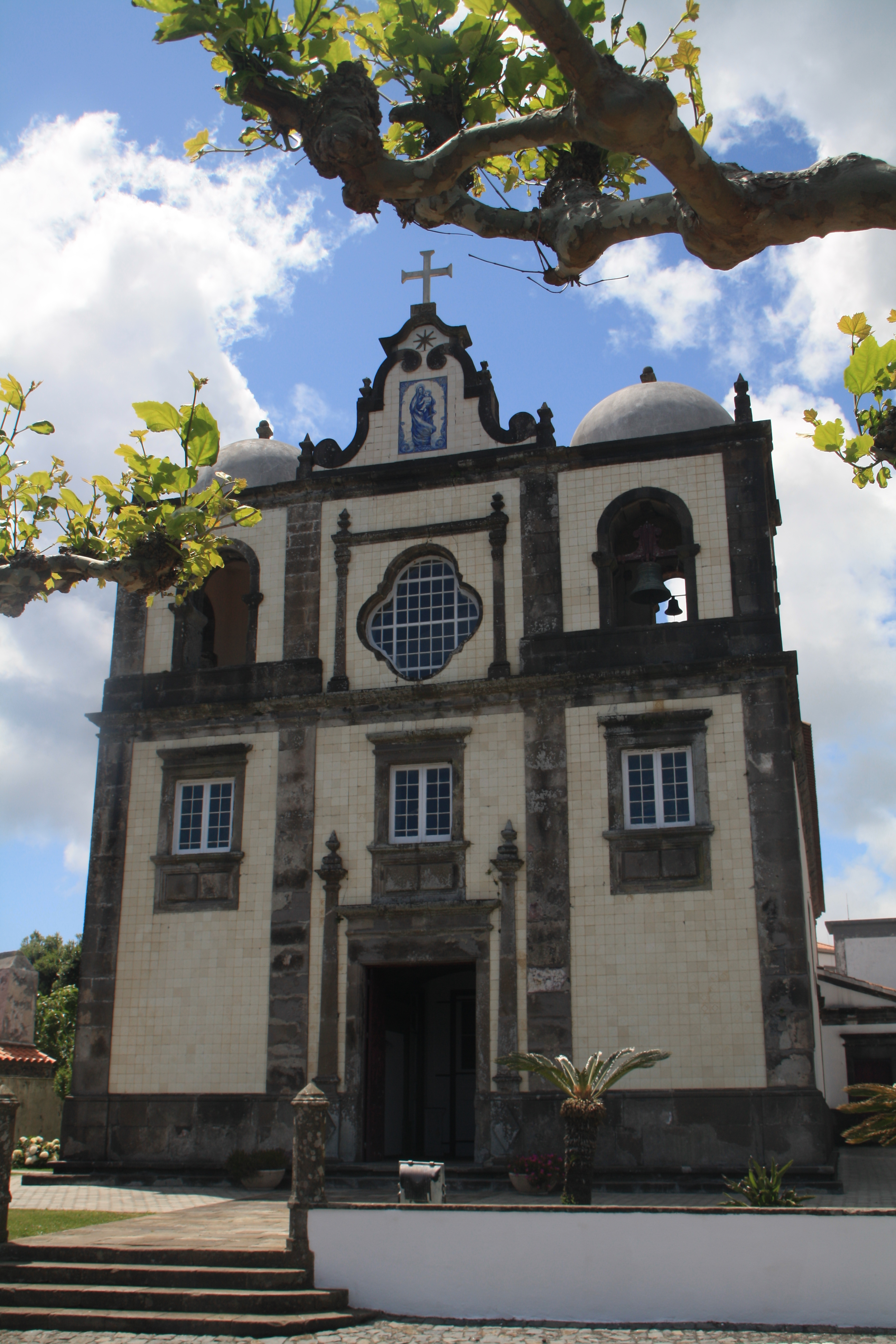
The imposing three-storey facade of the church, with its double bell towers

In 1515, Lajes was elevated to the status of town.

Sometime in the 16th century, the Hermitage of Espírito Santo (Divine Holy Spirit) which was located near the port was moved to the town, owing to a similar temple in the port.

On 25 July 1587, the primitive parochial church of Lajes, situated in the location occupied by the municipal cemetery was burned-down by English privateers, that landed five ships whose troops sacked the town and surrounding countryside.

By 1717, the parish included only 300 homes. Between 1763 and 1783, the actual church was raised on the site occupied by the Hermitage of Espírito Santo.

By 1800, there were 486 inhabitants comprising 75 homes and the parochial church within the town limits. Its vicar received a stipend of 7 bushels of wheat, 4 alqueires of wheat and 8$000 réis to support his services to the community.

In the middle of the 19th century, the church was renovated, followed by embellishments in the 1880s. At the beginning of the 20th century, the lateral retables were installed (1908), executed by the Florentinos António de Maurício de Fraga and Francisco José Pimentel. It would be another few decades before these retables were guided by the Micaelense artisan António Jacinto Carreiro (in the 1960s).

== Architecture ==
The church is located in the centre of the town, situated within a group of builds of the historic town, that include the Municipal Palace/Hall, the old Naval Radio-Telegraphic Station of Flores, as well as a short distance from the lighthouse of Lajes. It occupies a level courtyard and garden limited by minor wall.

The rectangular building has a principal facade that integrates two large, rectangular bell towers, long single-nave and auxiliary annexes that correspond to the sacristy.
