= Church of São Caetano (Lomba) =

- Church of St. Cajetan
- Igreja de São Caetano
- Church of São Caetano
- 39°24′6.3″N 31°9′23.3″W
- Location: Flores, Western, Azores
- Country: Portugal
- Denomination: Roman Catholic

Architecture
- Style: Revivalist

Administration
- Diocese: Diocese of Angra

The Church of São Caetano (Portuguese: Igreja Paroquial de Lomba/Igreja de São Caetano) is a 17th-century church located in the civil parish of Lomba in the municipality of Lajes das Flores, in the Portuguese island of Flores, in the archipelago of the Azores.

== History ==
In 1698, the parish of Lomba was created, and was associated with the probable construction of the primitive church.

The first parochial registers were dated from 1701.

The beginning of the rebuilding phase of the church began in 1753, that lasted until 1759.

Between 1873 and 1888, a new phase of construction was initiated. Father José António Camões, indicates that the church had a rector with a stipend that included 5 bushels, 3 alqueires and 8 of wheat, along with 8$000 réis, along with a treasurer supported by a bushel of wheat and 6$000 réis, supported by a contribution of 2$000 to the factory.

A new period of restoration and construction initiated in 1880, that ultimately lead to the church's re-consecration on 24 February 1886.

== Architecture ==
The church is implanted behind a small courtyard and comprises a single-nave extending to a narrower corp (corresponding to the presbytery) and annexes that included the sacristy and annexes off the principal space. The building is constructed in masonry stone plastered and painted white, with the cornerstones, pilasters, entablatures and frames in stonework.

The principal facade, which includes a belfry/steeple, is divided in three sections by entablatures (on the first floor an architrave, simple frieze and cornice and the second by just frieze and cornice) and in the three sections by a vertical pilasters (with plinths and capitals on the ground floor). The ground and first floor are complemented by arched windows; the first floor marked by rectangular doorway flanked by two windows and the upper floor with three windows corresponding to the openings on the ground floor. Over the main door is a cartouche with the sculpted 1888.

The main door opens to a small narthex, that corresponds to the perimeter of the tower, that extends to the windbreak. On either side of the narthex is a compartment accessible from the nave: opposite the epistole side is the baptistery and opposite it is winding staircase that leads to the high-choir and belfry. The choir, in wood, occupies the area at the front of the nave (over the windbreak) and is counter curved, protected by a guardrail of balustrades. It is preceded by a vestibule that is under the narthex and whose vaulted covering supports the belfry.

The walls of the nave have, on either side, a door that connects it to the exterior and three high windows. Opposite the epistole, to the right of the door, is a pulpit with large stone corbel and balustrade guardrail in wood. The door to the pulpit is the only one with double lintel surmounted by cornice. To the right of the pulpit is a door that leads to the sacristy. On angles to the nave, flanking the triumphal archway of the presbytery are retables, positioned on 45 degree angles. Within the main chapel, on either side, are doors that connect to the sacristy and storage annex. The lateral retables and principal chapel are gilded Revivalist decoration and partially painted, while the ceiling of the nave and presbytery are decorated in wood. In the sacristy is a chest of drawers and other Modernist furniture, in addition to a wood staircase that provides access to the pulpit.
