= Church of Senhor Santo Cristo dos Milagres (Fazenda) =

- Church of the Lord Holy Christ of the Miracles
- Igreja do Senhor Santo Cristo dos Milagres
- Church of Senhor Santo Cristo dos Milagres
- 39°23′20.7″N 31°9′59″W
- Location: Flores, Western, Azores
- Country: Portugal
- Denomination: Roman Catholic

Architecture
- Architect: João Jacinto Teixeira
- Style: Revivalist

Administration
- Diocese: Diocese of Angra

The Church of Santíssima Trindade (Portuguese: Igreja Paroquial de Mosteiro/Igreja da Santíssima Trindade) is an 18th-century church located in the civil parish of Fazenda in the municipality of Lajes das Flores, in the Portuguese island of Flores, in the archipelago of the Azores.
