= Francisco Nunes da Rosa =

Francisco Nunes da Rosa (22 February 1871? – 13 September 1946) was a Portuguese Catholic priest, short story writer and journalist.

== Biography ==
Born in Rio Vista, California, United States of America, to Portuguese migrants, he returned with them, at the age of five, to Madalena, Pico Island.

Ordained in 1893, he became the parish priest at the Church of Santíssima Trindade in Mosteiro, on Flores Island, post he held until transferring to the parish of Nossa Senhora da Boa Nova das Bandeiras, on Pico Island, in 1896, where he remained until his death.

While on Flores (1893-6), he wrote Pastorais do Mosteiro (1904) and while in Bandeiras (1896-1946) he wrote Gente das Ilhas.

Tomás da Rosa considers Nunes da Rosa one of the greatest Azorean storytellers, possibly second only to Vitorino Nemésio, deserving of a prominent place in the panorama of national fiction (Rosa, 1977), and, while “not reaching the level of the great Portuguese storytellers, he is, along with Florêncio Terra, a literary figure deserving of national projection, due to the quality of some of his stories of deep human expression with authentic, lively characters, in a very regional environment” (Rosa, 1990: 69).

He died in Bandeiras, Madalena, Pico Island on 13 September 1946.

== Bibliography ==
- Rosa, Tomás da. (1977), Gente das ilhas de Nunes da Rosa. Vigília, Horta.
- Rosa, Tomás da. (1990), Alguns estudos, Horta, Câmara Municipal da Horta.
