= Lajes das Flores (parish) =

Lajes
- Civil parish
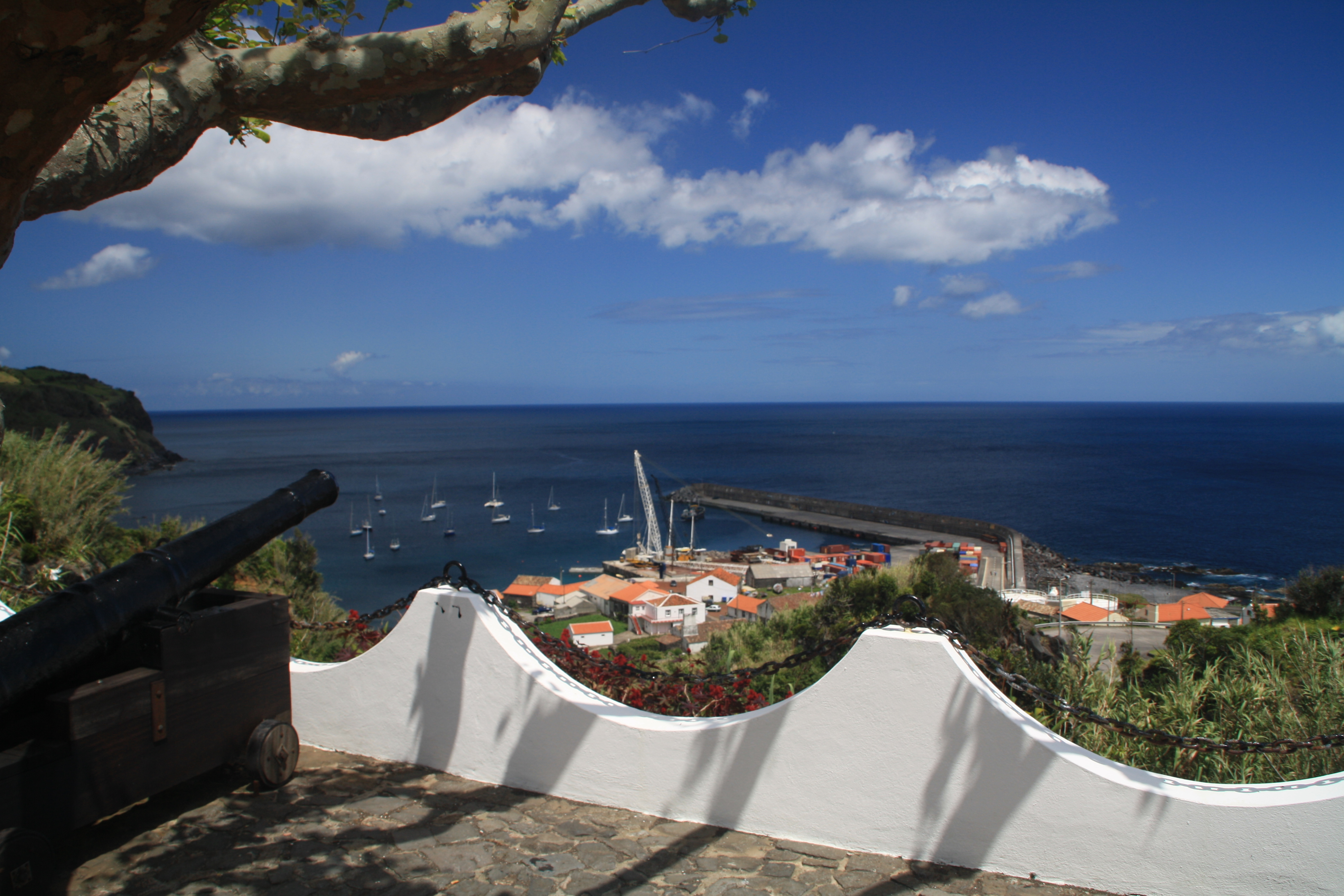
- The historical miradouro in the civil parish of Lajes, showing the emplacements used to protect the village from pirates

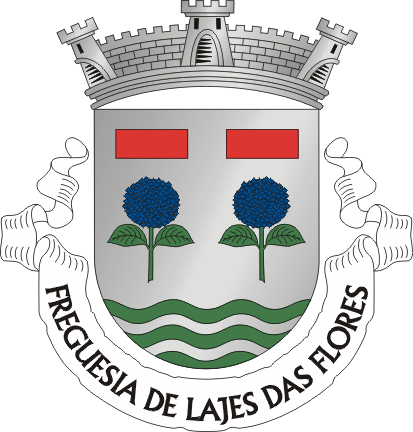
- Coat of arms

- Location in the Azores Lajes (Flores Island (Azores))
- Coordinates: 39°22′41″N 31°10′27″W
- Country: Portugal
- Auton. region: Azores
- Island: Flores
- Municipality: Lajes das Flores
- Established: Settlement: fl.1510 Town: c.1515

Area
  - Total: 18.79 km^{2} (7.25 sq mi)
- Elevation: 67 m (220 ft)

Population (2021)
  - Total: 562
  - Density: 29.9/km^{2} (77.5/sq mi)
- Time zone: UTC−01:00 (AZOT)
  - Summer (DST): UTC+00:00 (AZOST)
- Postal code: 9960-431
- Area code: 292
- Patron: Nossa Senhora do Rosário

Lajes das Flores is an Azorean civil parish, and municipal seat of the municipality of Lajes das Flores. The population in 2021 was 562, in an area of 18.79 km^{2}.

== History ==
The island and Corvo was discovered in 1452 (by Diogo de Teive and João de Teive, his son), donated on 20 January 1453 to D. Afonso of Bragança, its captaincy was eventually ceded by João Teive to Fernão Teles de Mensese on 20 January 1475. On 1 March 1504, the captaincy was donated to João da Fonesca by D. Manuel I. The village was founded in a sheltered bay, facilitating the easy disembarkation of goods and provisions, protected from westerly winds. The first documented settlement, by the Fleming Willem van der Haegen, occurred in the zone of Ribeira da Cruz (north of the parish) in the 16th century.

By 1510, the area of Lajes consisted of a significant population; it had benefited from its natural port and the settlement was elevated to the status of vila by the Portuguese government (responsible for administering the south and western portions of the island) by 1515 (making it the oldest settlement in the Western Group with this status). Initially, the settlement included Ribeira da Silva (in the area of Lomba), Fajã Grande, as well as the settlements of Lajedo, Fajãzinha, Caldeira, Mosteiro, Fajã Grande and Fazenda. Settlements in the western coast, with the exception of Lajedo, were de-annexed to form the parish of Nossa Senhora dos Remédios das Fajãs (independent as of 1676, with its seat in Fajãzinha).

The primitive church was constructed in the present location of the cemetery, but was burned-down by English privateers on July 25, 1587, when five English ships offloaded troops and sacked the village, and caused the residents to flee into the hills. Two fortes were constructed to guard the coastal frontier and villages: the Fort of Santo António, which defended the town from two American privateers in 1770 and the Forte do Espírito Santo. By 1868 these garrisons were demolished, but the name Santo António in the village remains, designating the area along the coast in front of the Church, the former location of the fort and chapel of the same name.

The historian Father António Cordeiro, in his work História Insulana described the village:

Her in the North, is the noble and strong Village of Lajes, in nothing is it subject to the Village of Santa Cruz, with more than 300 homes, and two great Companies, the Captain of Ordinance and the Captain-General of the Village, their space, constituted of one great road with many intersections, and have in front of them, to the sea, a few dangerous lowlands, where they committed the Villa, more than two leagues from the place known as São Pedro.

The Florense, José António Camões, in his Roteiro Exacto da Costa da Ilha, writing in the first decade of the 19th century, affirmed:

...there is that Village port in the south-southeast; outside is a bay anchored by sand. Continuing from the mentioned port, to the south is born a various cliffs, that is called the Canos d’agoa, that they say proceeded from the Caldeira Funda, which is found above it. Continuing to the south is the fajã called Fajã de Loppo Vaz, that they say was first place that they set foot on this island. They produce in this fajã all type of consumables, there is one of particular note, they leave the seeds in the shells of pumpkins, bogango, melons, watermelons, cabaça, etc. and in the following year, in the new culture of the following year, produce them as if being cultivated. There is in this Fajã a small port, quite ridiculous, called the English Port...the district of the Village of Lajes, in the river-valley of Fundão or Ladroens, continues to the South, in a short distance of more or less half a league existed in the pasta small settlement with two homes called Ribeira da Lapa, which is now desserted...its organ is Nossa Senhora do Rosário, whose Vicarage produces in the order of 7 moios, 4 alqueires of wheat and 8,000 reis. There is more, a chapel of the Castillians constructed in 1741...There is in this Village 75 homes where 486 souls reside, of them 240 men and 246 women. There are 35 tiled houses and 17 men with shoes. There are two companies of ordinance. The first formed in the Village, Monte and Morros, with one captain, one ensign, two lieutenants, that were strong, two sergeants and 170 soldiers, the second formed in Fazenda, Lajedo and Mosteiro, with one Captain, one Ensign, one Lieutenant, three Sergeants and 147 soldiers, with 77 in Fazenda, 36 in Lajedo and along the coast, and 34 in Mosteiro and Caldeira. There is a castle in the port of the Village with house and guard and nine pieces, and two large, one of which is along the cliff without a house, and one small.

Between 1763 and 1783, the parochial church was finally constructed.

Although formed as the religious parish to the invocation of the Divine Holy Spirit, the parish was changed to honour Nossa Senhora do Rosário (Our Lady of the Rosary), in the 19th century. Lajes was integrated into the municipality of Santa Cruz das Flores, between 1895 and 1898.

Fazenda was de-annexed in 1919.

== Geography ==
The urban area is implanted on a relatively plain escarpment, and arriba situated on the south-east corner of the island, expanding into the interior by its roadways. The area is marked by sloped relief, covered in forests, alternating with pasture-lands divided by hedgerows. Agricultural areas are completely divided, specifically between the parishes of Lajes and Fazenda.

The parish includes several smaller agglomerations and metropoles, that include the localities of Jogo da Bola, Monte, Morros, Outeiro Negro, Pátio Grande, Ribeira Seca and Vila de Baixo.

Between 1960 and 1980, emigrants of this parish became residents primarily of the United States and Canada. In 2001, the parish included 545 inhabitants (37% adolescents/children, 49% adults and 14% seniors), 437 registered to vote.

=== Ecoregions/Protected areas ===
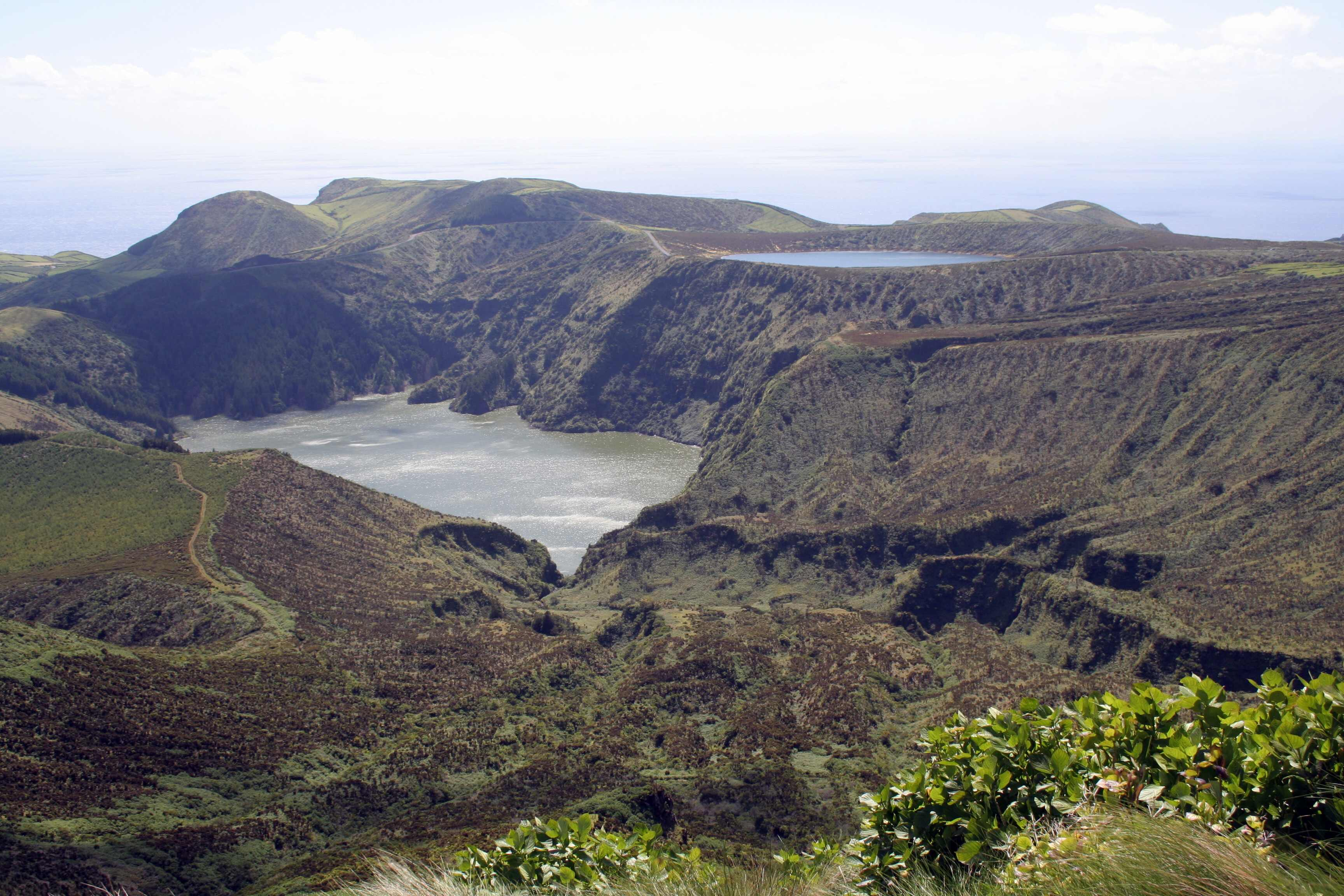
The landscape of Lagoa Comprida in the Natural Reserve of the Caldeiras Funda and Rasa

On 27 May 2009, Flores was included in the UNESCO world network of biosphere reserves. There are several natural landscapes that fall within the boundaries of the parish, these include:

- Natural Reserve of the Caldeiras Funda and Rasa - portions of the natural reserve, specifically the crater lakes of Lagoa Funda (Deep Lake) and Lagoa Comprida (Long Lake), fall within the parish's boundaries, a natural environment with many endemic plants and forests typical of the Azores;
- Pedrinha - a geological feature in the western part of the parish;
- Rocha Alta - the largest cliff on the island of Flores, about 500 meters in altitude;
- Fajã de Lopo Vaz - an area of high cliffs, with its islet (Islet of Lopo Vaz) located offshore;
- Pedras dos Frades - huge blocks of basalt rock located along the coast;
- Vale da Boca da Baleia - a valley landscape.

== Architecture ==
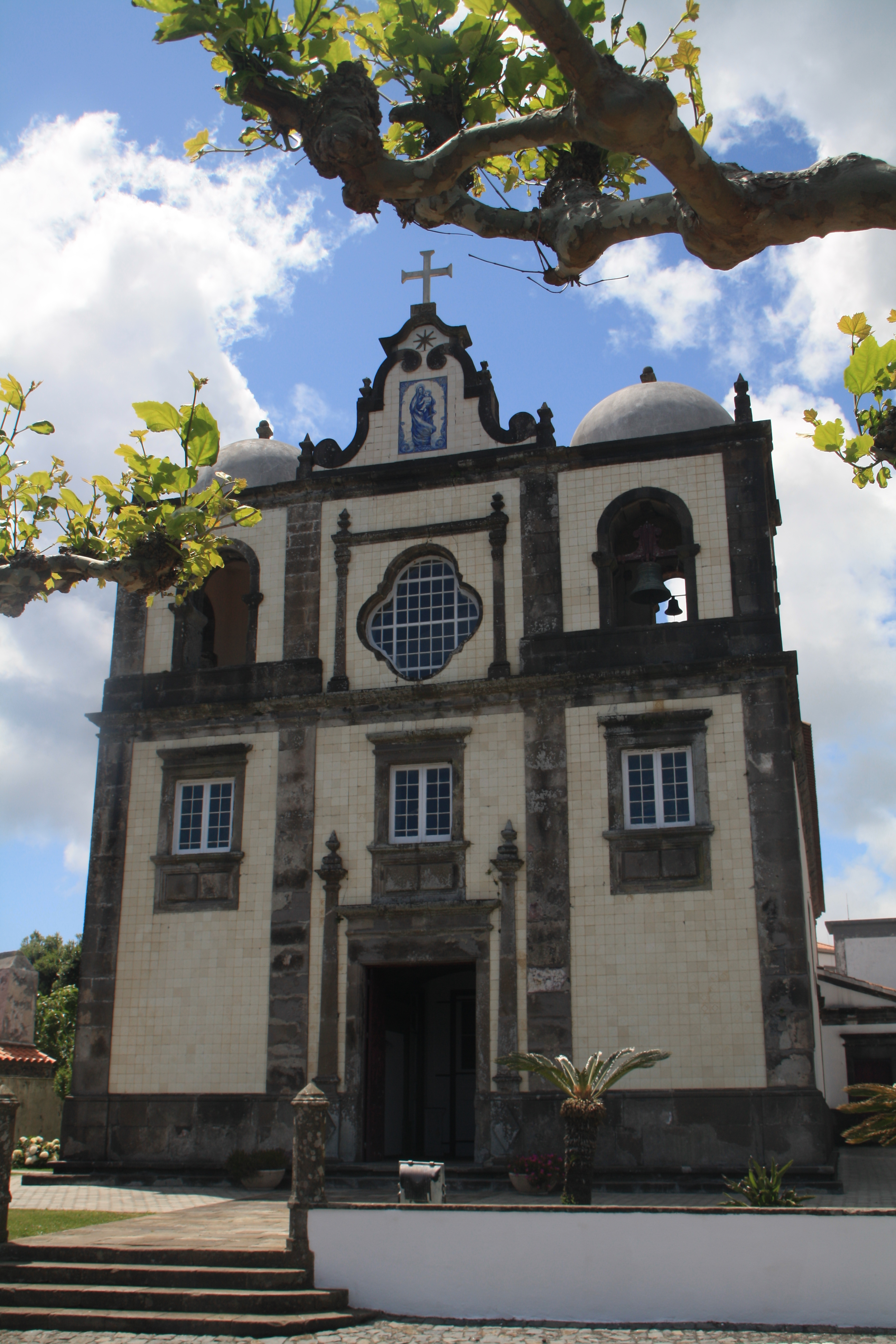
The front facade of the parochial Church of Nossa Senhora do Rosário, in the center of Lajes

The center of the parish is dominated by the Paços do Concelho (literally, the "Municipal Palace/Hall"), the dis-activated installations of Radionaval das Flores, the lighthouse and the commercial port (which serves the southern part of the island).

=== Civic ===
- Hostel Lajes (Portuguese: Pousada das Lajes), the single story mid-century building was constructed to support tourist activities;
- Lighthouse of Ponta das Lajes (Portuguese: Farol da Ponta das Lajes), although it was planned in the late 19th century, the first illuminated beacon on the site began operating in 1902, and a functional lighthouse only in 1910;
- Municipal Palace/Hall of Lajes das Flores (Portuguese: Paços do Concelho), the two-story Nationalist Style municipal building for Lajes das Flores;
- Naval Radio-Telegraphic Station of Flores (Portuguese: Estação Radiotelegráfica Naval das Flores), erected following a commission determined the need to install a beacon at Ponta das Lajes, but also to serve as radio and telegraph station: on 10 October 1910 it became operational;

In addition, there are three fountains constructed in the parish to provide water to the inhabitants since early settle: Chafrariz da Cruz, Chafrariz dos Morros and Chafrariz dos Montes;

=== Military ===
- Fort of Santo António (Portuguese: Forte de Santo António), demolished in 1868, the area in front of the Matriz Church retains the place-name, where the fort once protected the town.

=== Religious ===
- Church of Nossa Senhora do Rosário (Portuguese: Igreja Matriz de Lajes das Flores/Igreja de Nossa Senhora do Rosário), the current was constructed between 1763 and 1783, where the old chapel to the invocation of the Holy Spirit was located. It was renovated in the middle of the 19th century, but also received remodelling in 1880. The temple was repaired again in 1907 and 1910, with the lateral altars executed by the Florentines António de Maurício de Fraga and Francisco José Pimentel, and in the 1960s, by the Micaelense artist António Jacinto Carreiro. The church houses important reliquary that include a silver oil lamp, an antique ossuary and chalice offered by Pope Pius X, in gratitude for the assistance and rescue of people during the shipwreck of the Slavonia on 10 June 1909. It also houses an interesting painting of the "Baptism of Jesus" produced in the first quarter of the 20th century by Filomena Albertina Mourão de Freitas, a Lajense artist, who also created the image of Nossa Senhora do Rosário, for the azulejo on the front facade of the Church.
- Hermitage of Nossa Senhora das Angústias (Portuguese: Ermida de Nossa Senhora das Angústias), now located in the cemetery, it was once part of the original parochial Church; it was constructed in 1729 by two Spanish noblemen, D. Pedro and D. Manuel, who were saved from the shipwreck of the galleon Nuestra Señora de Angústias e San José alongside Lajes, with 180 crew (27 February 1727);
- House of the Divine Holy Spirit of Morros (Portuguese: Casa do Divino Espírito Santo dos Morros), a gathering-place for religious celebrations, constructed in 1846;
- House of the Divine Holy Spirit of Montes (Portuguese: Casa do Divino Espírito Santo dos Montes), also constructed to create a permanent presence for religious celebrations in 1868;
- Império of the Divine Holy Spirit (Portuguese: Império of the Divino Espírito Santo da Vila), reconstructed in 1819 and remodelled in 1846;
