= Lajedo (Lajes das Flores) =

- Civil parish
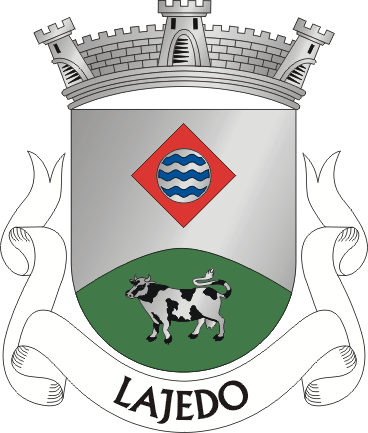
- Coat of arms

- Location in the Azores Lajedo (Flores Island (Azores))
- Coordinates: 39°23′32″N 31°14′51.45″W
- Country: Portugal
- Auton. region: Azores
- Island: Flores
- Municipality: Lajes das Flores
- Established: Settlement: fl.1800 Civil parish: c.1823

Area
  - Total: 6.79 km^{2} (2.62 sq mi)
- Elevation: 119 m (390 ft)

Population (2021)
  - Total: 75
  - Density: 11/km^{2} (29/sq mi)
- Time zone: UTC−01:00 (AZOT)
  - Summer (DST): UTC+00:00 (AZOST)
- Postal code: 9960-360
- Area code: 292
- Patron: Nossa Senhora dos Milagres
- Website: freguesialajedo.webs.com

Lajedo (pronounced [la.ˈʒe.du]) is a civil parish in the municipality of Lajes das Flores on the Portuguese island of Flores, in the archipelago of the Azores. The population in 2021 was 75, in an area of approximately 6.79 square kilometres (2.62 mi^{2}).

== History ==
Nossa Senhora dos Milagres de Lajedo, was one of the first settlements on the island, camouflaged and protected from North Atlantic pirates by the ridges and rocky outcrops where the settlements began. In fact, its name (Lajedo) means pavement covered in slabs; place where there are many slabs; large slabs and smooth, indicating the type of geology discovered by first explorers. Its 637 hectares of fertile soils, were explained by Isatis Tinctoria as ideal conditions to shelter and support those who wanted to live in the zone.

This is how João Soares dos Mosteiros, a native of the island of São Miguel, who made shore on the site and decided to stay, colonize and develop the region. Gaspar Frutuoso later wrote:

"By his hands [he] made, caulked and constructed a boat, without knowing any of these trades, and went with his wife and children to hear mass in the village of Lajes. They said of him, that when he returned home, he asked of his oldest daughter to take the boat up, and she placed it on her head and placed it where she wanted, for it was small and badly made, but served him, for the road was laborious, and many times this João Soares, went to Lajes on this small boat and, at times, fished in it."

The chronicler also registered the existence of two islets in the seat, land for animal raising and little pastureland to the interior, but that sustained game birds. Along the coast Frutuoso indicated the availability of sheltered anchorages and a freshwater ravine that could support ships by providing potable water. This area, which he referred as Lajedos, because the land is flatten and cliffs little high, that provide bread and woad.

Father José António Camões writing in 1815 described the region in these terms:

...there is a fajã called Costa, that has many vineyards, many fruit orchards, much like the rest of the island...within the islet Cartario, there is another smaller, and within this a cove called Portinho do Lajedo, where there wades small boats, but only with a lot of calm...[the hermitage of Nossa Senhora dos Milagres]...to which many devotees concur, it is more probable, that their devotion consists without exception in carrying their violins, and playing and dancing with the girls, etc.

The parish of Lajedo was created by regal charter at the end of 1823, even though a parish had already existed since 1781, under the invocation of Nossa Senhora dos Milagres. This temple was reconstructed in 1868, under the supervision of the parish priest, Father Francisco Luís de Freitas Henriques. The new parish was delimited by the Ribeira da Lapa, Rebentão and Rocha Alta, and the Rector assigned a priest for "four moios and 501 bushels of wheat and 8000 réis in money and a Treasurer for 1 moio of wheat and 3000 réis, that included hosts and wine, to be paid for by the island treasury".

Lajedo depended, administratively, on the municipality of Santa Cruz between 1895 and 1898, during the suppression of Lajes das Flores, when only one municipality existed on the island.

Electricity arrived to the region late, only on 4 February 1978, where until then work at night was done by whale oil lamps, kerosene or fire light. Pierluigi Bragaglia, an Italian who lived in Lajes, wrote of a curious episode associated with the agricultural cooperative Ilha das Flores, whose seat was in Lajedo, and ultimately powered the local economy and provided electricity.

It was this last parish of Flores that abandoned the old lamps and whale oil, whose director of the Cooperative, José de Freitas Escobar Júnior, installed, with several years in advance, a turbine in a ravine below the village, and with a system of wires he could turn on the light of his office...to do his accounts, an early night...by means of a simple interruptor; almost a miracle for other parishes.

José de Freitas Escobar Júnior, was one of the more important figures in the Azores, owing to his management and directorship of the Cooperative Ilha das Flores, for 40 years. Native of Flores, he had emigrated to the United States and later to Brazil, before returning some years later when his brother was gravely ill. He decided to remain, because he felt he could contribute to Lajedo; the fact that he had engineered electrical light thirty years before the electrification of the parish, already made him a popular figure. The system was complex, but its functioning demonstrated the authors capacity: he was made president of the municipal council of Lajes between 1944 and 1946 and, once again in 1948. He died in 1986, at the age of 84, in the parish of Mosteiro.

== Geography ==
Situated in the extreme southern portion of the island of Flores, Lajedo is located 9 kilometres (5.6 mi) from the seat of the municipality (Lajes) and 22 kilometres (14 mi) from the regional airport in Santa Cruz das Flores. The parish consists of several smaller communities and localities, including specifically the villages of Campanário and Costa, an area that is primarily marked by fertile pasturelands supported by the ravines of Campanário and Lapa, that cross the territory.

== Architecture ==
=== Civic ===
- Ceramic Kiln along Costa do Lajedo (Portuguese: Forno de Cerâmica na Costa do Lajedo)
- Fountain Rua Avelino Lopes de Freitas (Portuguese: Chafariz Rua Avelino Lopes de Freitas)
- Haylofts along Costa do Lajedo (Portuguese: Palheiros da Costa do Lajedo)
- Residence Costa do Lajedo (Portuguese: Casa de Habitação da Costa do Lajedo)

=== Religious ===
- Church of Nossa Senhora dos Milagres (Portuguese: Igreja Paroquial de Lajedo/Igreja de Nossa Senhora dos Milagres)
- Império of the Divine Holy Spirit da Costa do Lajedo (Portuguese: Império do Divino Espírito Santo da Costa do Lajedo)
- Império of the Divine Holy Spirit do Lajedo (Portuguese: Império do Divino Espírito Santo do Lajedo)
- Stone Cross (Portuguese: Cruz de Pedra Estrada Regional E.R.1-1A, 22.9 km marker)

== Notable citizens ==
- José de Freitas Escobar Júnior (Lajedo, 1902 - Mosteiro, 1986), was an entrepreneur and politician, manager of the Cooperative Ilha das Flores and president of the municipal council of Lajes, known for his early electrification of Lajedo and directorship of the cooperative;
- Francisco Caetano Tomás (born 12 September 1924), priest/canon in the Roman Catholic Diocese of Angra and seminary; was educated in Philosophy, and much later, ordained as a priest in Rome, before residing in Angra do Heroísmo, providing instruction in the local Seminary, for many years;
