= Mosteiro (Lajes das Flores) =

- Civil parish
- Location in the Azores Mosteiro (Flores Island (Azores))
- Coordinates: 39°24′46.4″N 31°15′.6″W
- Country: Portugal
- Auton. region: Azores
- Island: Flores
- Municipality: Lajes das Flores
- Established: Settlement: 1676; Parish: 1860; Civil parish: 13 January 1898

Area
  - Total: 5.99 km^{2} (2.31 sq mi)
- Elevation: 279 m (915 ft)

Population (2021)
  - Total: 19
  - Density: 3.2/km^{2} (8.2/sq mi)
- Time zone: UTC−01:00 (AZOT)
  - Summer (DST): UTC+00:00 (AZOST)
- Postal code: 9960-630
- Area code: 292
- Patron: Santíssima Trindade
- Website: freguesiamosteiro.webs.com

Mosteiro is the smallest civil parish in the municipality of Lajes das Flores on the Portuguese island of Flores, in the archipelago of the Azores. The population in 2021 was 19, in an area of 5.99 square kilometres (2.31 mi^{2}).

== History ==
Its toponymy has been debated by historians, although some theories suggest that it was named for the comparable civil parish on the island of São Miguel. The first colonists, motivated to settle here by a man named João Soares, were settlers from the region of Mosteiros, renaming this zone in its honour.

In 1676, the locality of Mosteiro was de-annexed from the parish of Lajes das Flores and included in the ecclesiastical parish of the Fajãs, with its seat in the parish of Nossa Senhora dos Remédios da Fajanzinha.

The adventurer António de Freitas, former seminarian, had emigrated to China, where he made his fortune. Returning from his life in the Far East in 1846, he ordered the construction of the Parochial Church of Mosteiro, in the invocation of the Holy Trinity, in gratitude for God's intervention in saving his possessions during the trip.

In 1850, Mosteiro was elevated to parish, along with Caldeira, on the completion of the parochial church. As related by Francisco Gomes, "at the time of the erection of the parish it was decently ornamented, and provided with vestments, and other objects necessary for the Divine Cult". During this period, the parish included 90 homes, including 300 inhabitants. As Father José António Camões, wrote after describing the bridge of Sargo, he also referred to the small port of Mosteiro "where tragically three or four boats capsized...the small port is part of a small community called "Os Mosteiros", and indicate the existence of two streams, the "Ribeira do Mosteiro" and "Ribeira dos Ladrões" (or Fundão) that ends the district of the parish of Nossa Senhora dos Remédios and Nossa Senhora do Rosário of Lajes". The same historian referred to a population of 31 homes, including 83 men and 92 women, noting: "There are eight tiled houses, and not a man who wears shoes. There is a twenty-year judge with scribe, subject to the jurisdiction of the town of Lajes. The ordinance soldiers of the village are subordinate to the 2nd company in the villa of Lajes."

During the 18th century, with the lack of development and investments, many of the residents from the parish abandoned the parish for prosperous centres in Brazil. This was later supplanted by emigration to the United States.

The parish continued to be part of the municipality of Santa Cruz das Flores, between 18 November 1895 and 13 January 1898, when Lajes was suppressed.

== Geography ==
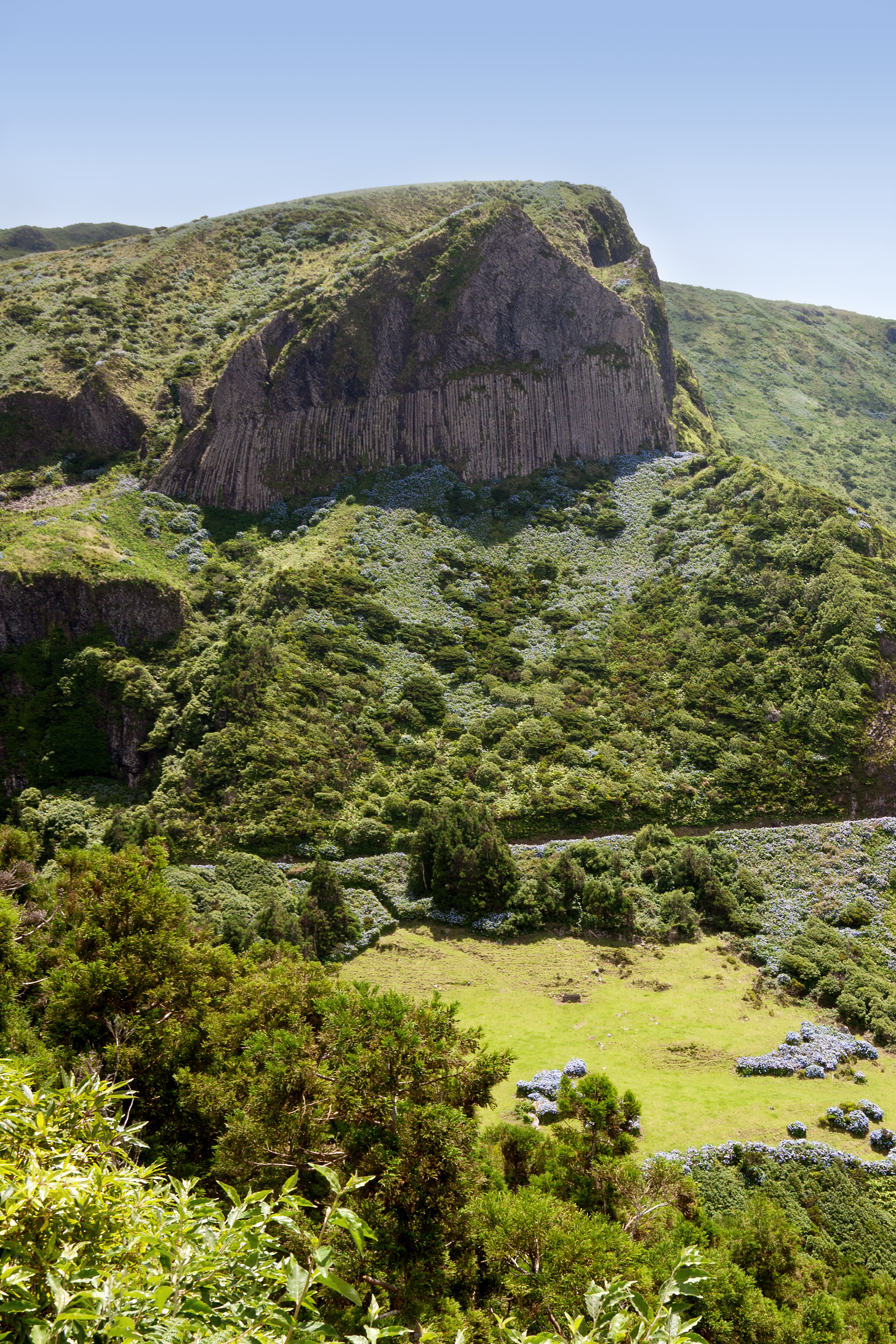
A view of the Rocha dos Bordões one of the emblematic geological features of the island

The parish of Mosteiro is part of the municipality of Lajes das Flores, whose municipal seat is located 20 kilometres (12 mi). With an area of 7 square kilometres (2.7 mi^{2}), it was one of the smallest parishes in Portugal, constituted by the settlements of Mosteiro and the locality of Caldeira.

The parish and coastal waters are a natural sanctuary for endemic, maritime flora and fauna, many unexplored, offering conditions for fishing, diving and nautical sports.

== Economy ==
Agriculture, herding and a subsistence economy supports the economy of the parish. Cultivation of lands and raising of dairy/cattle are the essential parts of the islands' economy. Almost all the residents raise dairy cattle, on a subsistence basis, in particular pastures and greenspace, resulting in the associated nickname Green Meat (Portuguese: Carne Verde). Considered a speciality market, the meat produce has become a regional mark for the island.

Mosteiro is the centre of the regional public school for basic and 1st cycle instruction, but is inoperative due to the lack of students.

Helping to support its nascent tourist market, the parish maintains several historical buildings and structures; these include parochial church, the Império de Divino Espírito Santo, the watermills and lookouts, such as the Chafariz da Caldeira, Cabeço do Sinal, Cabeço da Muda, Vista do Portal Poio and Cruz dos Bredos.

== Architecture ==
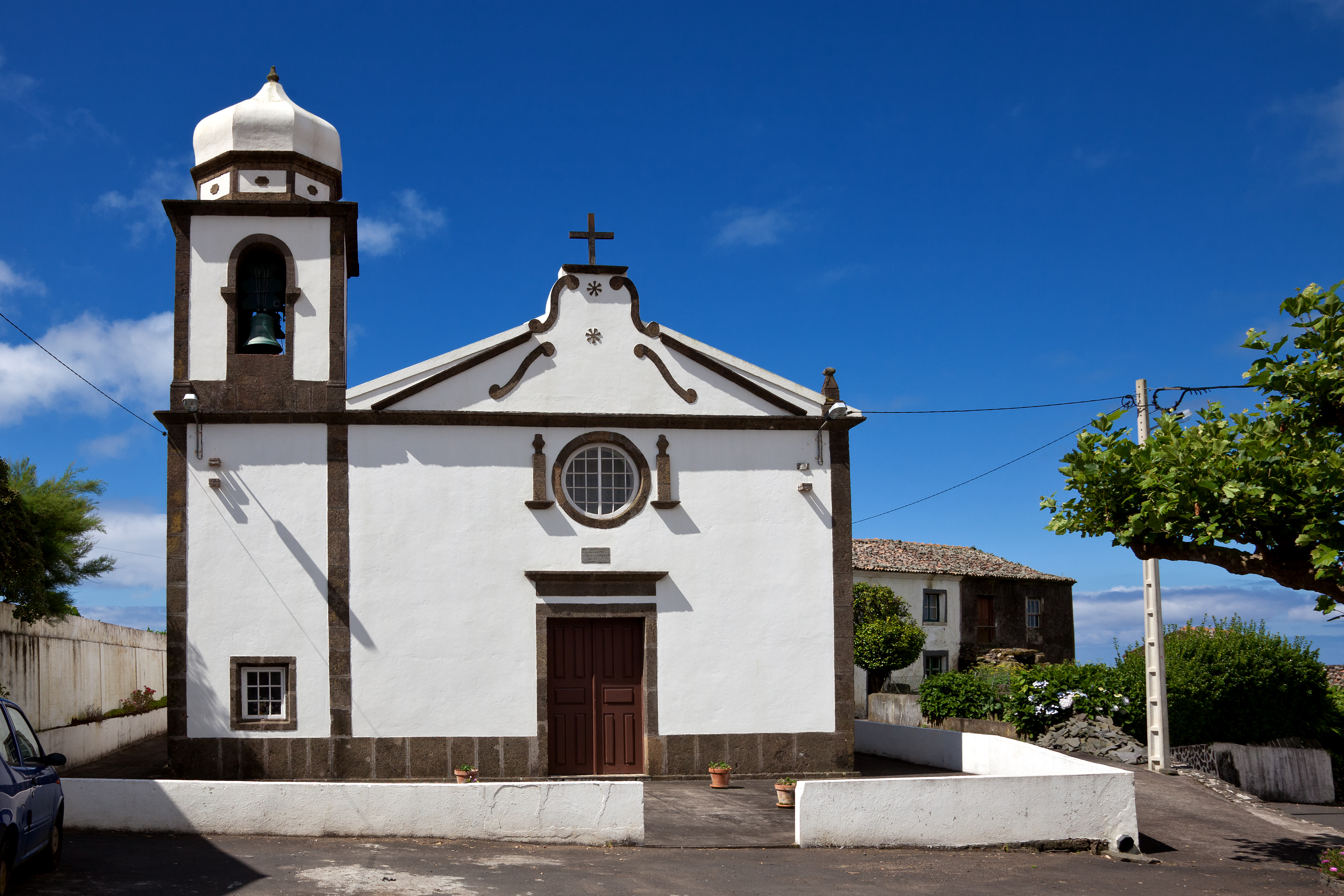
The parochial Church of the Santissima Trinidade in the centre of the parish

=== Civic ===
- Haylofts of Mosteiro (Portuguese: Palheiros de Mosteiro), a group of haylofts characterized by two story buildings of local stone, dating from the 19th century;

=== Religious ===
- Church of Santíssima Trindade (Portuguese: Igreja Paroquial de Mosteiro/Igreja da Santíssima Trindade), an 18th-century, Revivalist temple, comprising a single nave and presbytery, with a well-illuminated interior and ceilings of wood. The principal facade was completed with a triangular frontispiece, marked by a rectangular portico and oculi, while the interior include a high altar, two lateral retables on angles, in addition to a revivalist altarpiece;
- Funeral Monument of António Freitas (Portuguese: Monumento Funerário de António Freitas), situated in the cemetery of Mosteiro, the funeral monument is composed of an urn elevated above four steps over a plinth, while surmounted by cross. The monument includes decorative elements, such as flowers, and to the north, the urn is decorated with a skull and crossbones.
