= Caveira (parish) =

- Civil parish
- Location in the Azores Caveira (Flores Island (Azores))
- Coordinates: 39°25′54″N 31°9′6″W
- Country: Portugal
- Auton. region: Azores
- Island: Flores
- Municipality: Santa Cruz das Flores
- Established: Settlement: c.1478 Parish: c.1823 Civil parish: c.1836

Area
  - Total: 3.28 km^{2} (1.27 sq mi)
- Elevation: 289 m (948 ft)

Population (2021)
  - Total: 76
  - Density: 23/km^{2} (60/sq mi)
- Time zone: UTC−01:00 (AZOT)
  - Summer (DST): UTC+00:00 (AZOST)
- Postal code: 9970-031
- Area code: 292
- Patron: Nossa Senhora do Livramento

Caveira (pronounced [kɐ.ˈvɐ͜i.ɾɐ]) is the smallest freguesia ("civil parish") by area on the island of Flores, located within the municipality (concelho) of Santa Cruz das Flores, in the Azorean archipelago (Portugal). The population in 2021 was 76, in an area of 3.28 km^{2}. It is located 5 kilometers south of Santa Cruz das Flores, the municipal seat, in an area primarily concentrating on agriculture.

== History ==
The first colonists were a group of Flemish settlers captained by Willem van der Haegen, who selected the valley of Ribeira da Cruz for his settlement. They arrived at the end 15th century with the hope of finding precious metals (tin and silver, specifically), in the belief that Flores was part of the mythical Ihas Cassitérides (English: Islands of Silver and Tin). They made their homes in the small grottoes along the river-valley, but when they realized that there were no deposits, they abandoned their settlement and moved to the area of Topo, on the island of São Jorge. The area remained uninhabited for many decades until the 16th century, as Father Gaspar Frutuoso noted is his historical tome Saudades da Terra and where he mentioned the community but omitted whether it was populated. The first reference to a populated settlement in Caveira appeared in the works of António Cordeiro, published in 1717, citing the existence of a small place along the coast.

From here Caveira evolved, becoming a primitive community dependent on the much larger administrative and religious village of Santa Cruz (whose parish included Caveira). Owing to the distance and difficulty in traveling from the valley of Ribeira da Cruz, in 1757, the parish vicar (Father Agostinho Pereira de Lacerda) requested that the bishop of Angra (at that time Brother Valério do Sacramento) annex Caveira to the neighboring parish of São Caetano da Lomba (even though it was part of the neighboring municipality). The situation did not improve communication or the betterment of the faith community connected to Lomba, and with the assistance of a local property-holder (José António de Sousa Bettencourt of Graciosa), a small chapel was constructed on the current site of the local cemetery. The chapel to the invocation of Benditas Almas (Blessed Souls), was 12 metres in length and 4.2 meters in width. Once completed, the parish priest José Joaquim de Almeida quickly petitioned that Caveira should be elevated to parish, going as far as a petition directly to King John VI of Portugal (dated December 19, 1823). The church remained the property of João António Bettencourt (a descendant) who maintained the building in a reasonable condition, but its condition degraded considerably. In a report by the Civil Governor of the District of Horta (in 1867), António José Vieira Santa Rita reported the lamentable condition of the sanctuary. The cornerstone of the new church was laid on June 13, 1870, but its completion was slow and difficult. Although supported by emigres to the United States and notable local residents, such as the Visconde da Silva Figueira, the main chapel wasn't completed until September 11, 1880. From this time the new church was named for Nossa Senhora do Livramento, although the Church in Angra refused to accept the change.

In the beginning of the 20th century, rich in dairy resources, a local man (José Luís) began a local butter-producing business focused on the local Caveirense market. As the local population slowly shrank, the business was eventually integrated into the União das Cooperatives.

=== Legend of Caveira ===
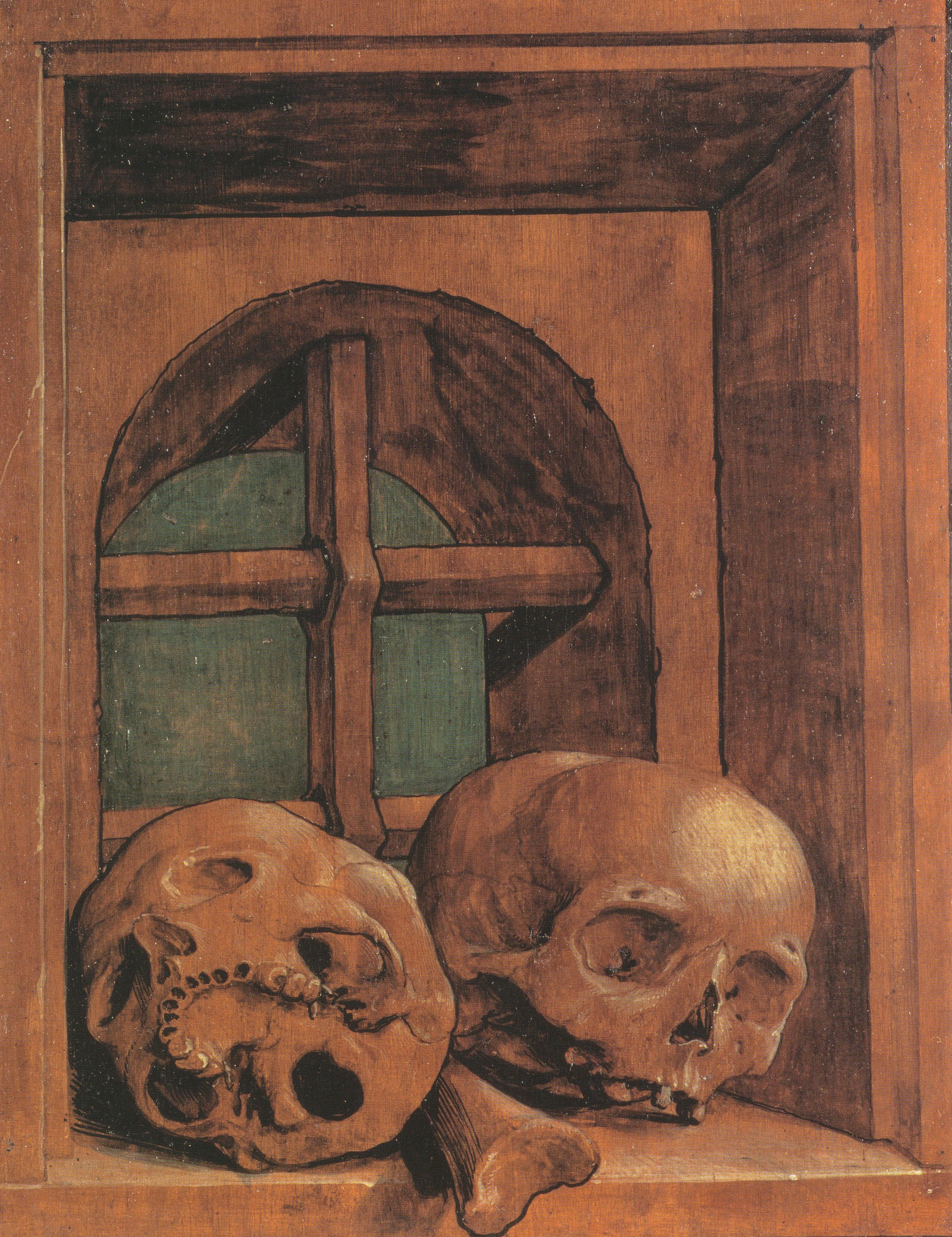
The legend of how the village received its name

During the 16th century, during the Age of Exploration, caravels frequently passed along Flores, on their voyages between Europe and the Americas. These ships were regularly buffeted by Atlantic storms and shipwrecked along the coast. It is said that a survivor of one of these storms, hungry, wet and cold, appeared along a windy and rugged part of the north-east coast, where he was given food, dry clothes and cared for by the local residents. The man, Demétrio, began to enjoy his life in the small village, married and remained there, where he became a popular with its residents. Although a good Christian man, he had many ideas that were considered heretical: for example, he exclaimed that prayers for the dead had no meaning and he negated the existence of Purgatory or Hell. Finally, although he believed in a soul, he believed that it resided in the blood, and that upon a human's death it separated from the body and transformed into a bird, until the body was cremated or degenerated into the soil. He also believed that the bird was the incarnation of Morana, the god of death, and that it sang while the body died, facilitating the soul's entrance into heaven.

While his neighbours did not accept his ideas, he continued to live, educating his sons, and living in harmony with the residents of the village. After a few years, Demétrio, now an old man, after many years in bed with illness, died. At that moment a wagtail flew onto a faia tree close by, but did not begin to sing as was expected. Demétrio was buried on top of a mountain, and his wife, influenced by her husband's faith, was a little preoccupied with the fact that the bird did not sing. After some time afterword there started to appear a skull (Portuguese: caveira) with an inner light, and the local residents believed that it was Demétrio's soul trying to obtain prayers in order to be delivered from Purgatory. Someone then decided to begin services and pray the rosary for God's intercession on behalf of the good, but heretical, Demétrio. After a short time, the bird began to sing and the skull stopped appearing. At the top of the rugged rock the family constructed a niche, with a panel representing the skull, but the name of the village began to referred to as Caveira.

== Geography ==
=== Physical geography ===
The small parish is located along a promontory divided by a couple of river-valleys: Ribeira da Cruz, in the north, which bisects the hamlet, and Ribeira da Silva, in the south, which separates the civil parish from Lomba, in the municipality of Lajes das Flores. In addition, the Ribeira do Moirato bisects the southern portion of the parish and joins the Ribeira da Silva to empty into the ocean along Fajã Pedro Vieira. The Caveira promontory is encircled by basaltic fractures and dominated by Ponta da Caveira, an area formed from large polychromatic basalts formations where the community is situated. The northern Ribeira da Cruz is an open escarpment and valley that extends towards the center of the island. Near the mouth of the Ribeira da Cruz is the large cliffs of Rocha Fernão Jorge, a semi-triangular physical feature formed from basaltic prisms originating from lava flows. It is a unique feature, similarly found in Antsiranana Bay, northern Madagascar.

Along the coast is the Gruta dos Encharéus, a large cavern/fracture at the base of Ponta da Caveira (50 meters width, 25 meters long and 15 meters in depth) where boats may penetrate and dock. It was once used as a hideout for pirates, privateers and smugglers in the past, but is currently a tourist site.

=== Climate ===
The higher altitudes makes the parish susceptible to strong ocean winds. Heavy precipitation in this zone allows agriculture to thrive, and in particular the raising of dairy cattle.

=== Human geography ===
The catholic faith community is guided by Nossa Senhora do Livramento, although officially still holding onto the primitive Benditas Almas canonical titles. Its relative proximity to Santa Cruz has allowed the growth of secondary industries associated with activities in the municipal center. The parish also contains the locality Espigão.

== Economy ==
The community is focused on agricultural production, and in particular dairy activities. As mentioned, João Luís, was the principal investor in the local butter industry in Caveira. In other communities on Flores, other businessmen concentrated on the single-market butter business; for example, Ponta Ruiva and Ponta Delgada had their own butter factories serving their own markets. These smaller communities did not participate in the Florense agricultural syndicate pioneered by José Furtado Mota at the time. This created tensions between consumers and producers, who remarked in a 1918 Açoreano Oriental article that residents of Santa Cruz were never supplied butter, even as 10,000 kilograms of butter were being exported. Local residents of this community were required to travel to any of the outlying communities in order to purchase butter, including Caveira. The gradual de-population of this community spelled the extinction of the private butter industry, as the União das Cooperatives swallowed-up smaller businesses.

== Architecture ==
- Bridge of Ribeira da Silva (Portuguese: Ponte de Ribeira da Silva)
- Residence Rua do Norte (Portuguese: Casa de Habitação da Rua do Norte)

=== Religious ===
- Church of Benditas Almas (Portuguese: Igreja Paroquial de Caveira/Igreja das Benditas Almas), around 1767 the first small church, was constructed under the initiative of José António de Sousa Bettencourt (dedicated to the Blessed Souls) on the site of today's cemetery, but the current church (of the same invocation) was only founded in 1867;

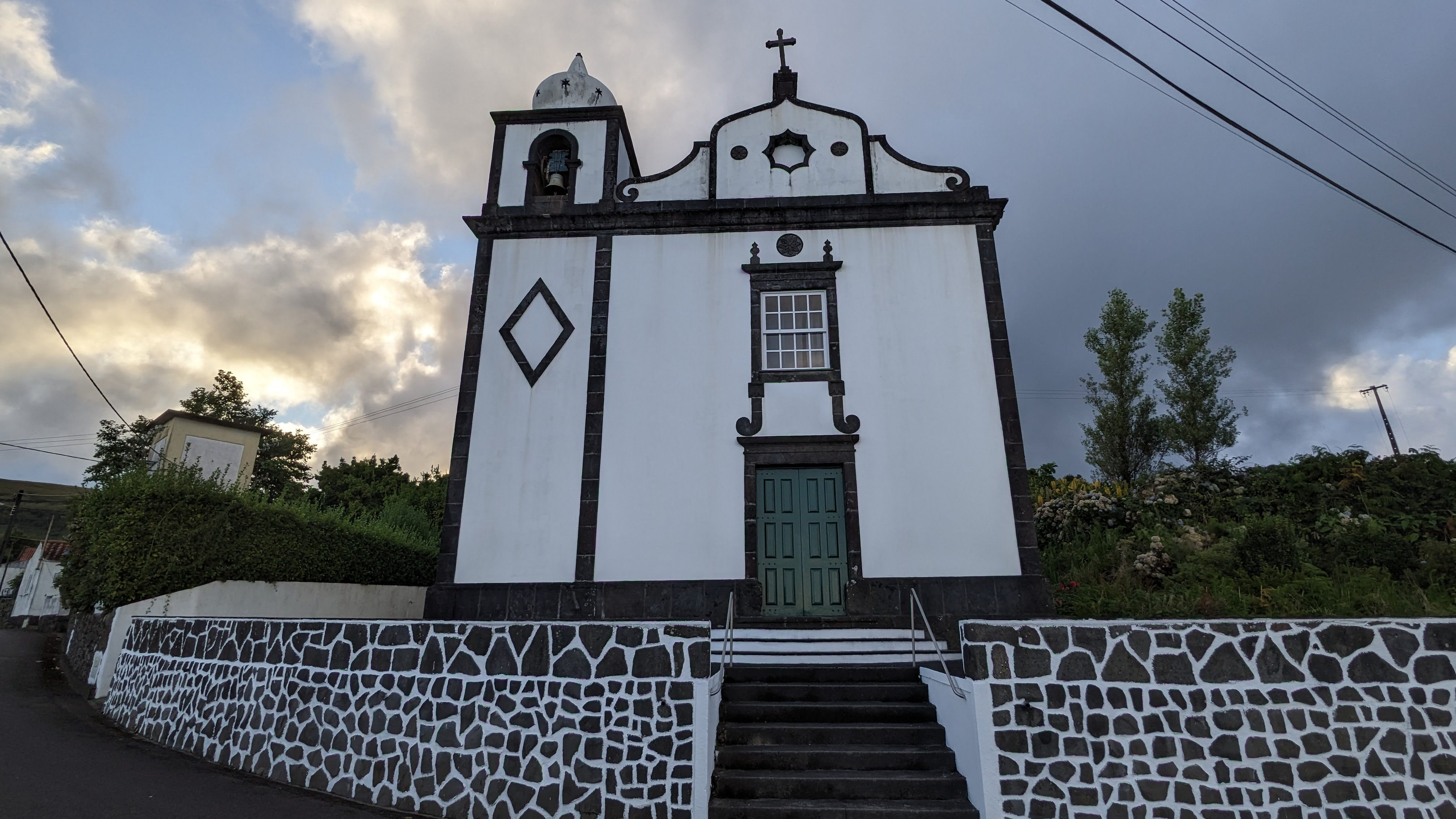
Church in Caveira - Church of Benditas Almas
