= Lomba (Lajes das Flores) =

- Civil parish
- Location in the Azores Lomba (Flores Island (Azores))
- Coordinates: 39°24′5″N 31°9′23″W
- Country: Portugal
- Auton. region: Azores
- Island: Flores
- Municipality: Lajes das Flores
- Established: Settlement: fl.1510

Area
  - Total: 9.87 km^{2} (3.81 sq mi)
- Elevation: 197 m (646 ft)

Population (2021)
  - Total: 200
  - Density: 20/km^{2} (52/sq mi)
- Time zone: UTC−01:00 (AZOT)
  - Summer (DST): UTC+00:00 (AZOST)
- Postal code: 9960-500
- Area code: 292
- Patron: São Caetano
- Website: www.cmlajesflores.com/lomba/lomba.htm

Lomba is a civil parish in the municipality of Lajes das Flores on the island of Flores in the Portuguese archipelago of the Azores. The population in 2021 was 200 in an area of 9.87 square kilometres (3.81 sq mi).

== History ==
The religious parish, since 1698, was established to the invocation of Saint Cajetan of Thiene, at the time a population of 750 residents (during the 19th century).

== Geography ==
The civil parish is located on the east-southeast coast of the island, and confined by the parishes Fazenda (to the south) and Caveira (in the north), approximately 5 kilometers from the municipal seat, along the margins of Ribeira da Silva on the border of the municipality. Its taxonomy was derived from its location; Lomba was located on a high precipice over the ocean, delimited by valleys on either side (lomba is the Portuguese term for hill), and was once called Lomba da Boa Vista.

== Architecture ==
=== Civic ===
- Agricultural sheds Rua do Cabeço (Portuguese: Estaleiros da Rua do Cabeç)
- Fountain of Lomba (Portuguese: Chafariz da Lomba)
- Hayloft of Quateiro (Portuguese: Palheiro ao Quarteiro)
- Port of Lomba (Portuguese: Porto da Lomba)
- Residence of Maurício Vieira (Portuguese: Casa do Maurício Vieira)
- Residence Rua da Terra Chã (Portuguese: Casa de Habitação da Rua da Terra Chã)

=== Religious ===
- Church of São Caetano (Portuguese: Igreja Paroquial de Lomba/Igreja de São Caetano), the parochial church dates to 1698, but the current structure was constructed during the 18th century, based on a common three-register structure prevalent in the region, that includes a steeple/belfry.
- Funeral Monumento (Portuguese: Monumento Funerario do Cemitério da Lomba)
- Império of the Divine Holy Spirit of Lomba (Portuguese: Império do Divino Espírito Santo da Lomba)
