= Lajes das Flores =

- Municipality
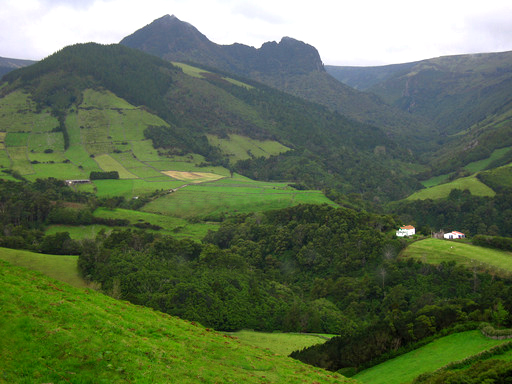
- Rugged interior of the municipality of Lajes das Flores

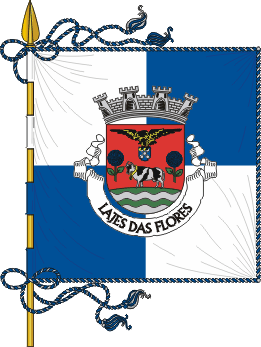
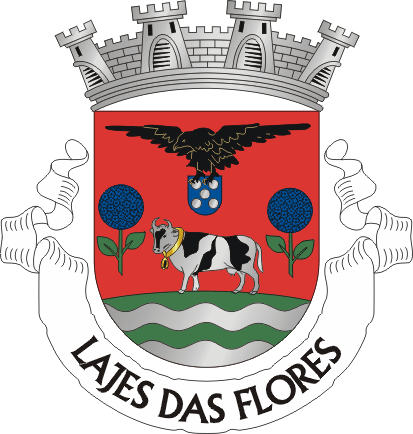
- Flag Coat of arms
- Interactive map of Lajes das Flores
- Location in the Azores Lajes das Flores (Flores Island (Azores))
- Coordinates: 39°24′20″N 31°13′4″W
- Country: Portugal
- Auton. region: Azores
- Island: Flores
- Established: Settlement: c.1457 Municipality: c.1832
- Parishes: 7

Government
  - President: João António Vieira Lourenço

Area
  - Total: 70.05 km^{2} (27.05 sq mi)
- Elevation: 384 m (1,260 ft)

Population (2021)
  - Total: 1,408
  - Density: 20.10/km^{2} (52.06/sq mi)
- Time zone: UTC−01:00 (AZOT)
  - Summer (DST): UTC+00:00 (AZOST)
- Postal code: 9960-431
- Area code: (+351) 292 XXX-XXXX
- Patron: Nossa Senhora do Rosário
- Local holiday: 3rd Monday in July
- Website: Cmlajesflores

Lajes das Flores (Portuguese pronunciation: [ˈlaʒɨʒ ðɐʃ ˈfloɾɨʃ]) is a municipality in the western part of the Azores; it includes the southern part of the island of Flores. To the north, it is bordered by Santa Cruz das Flores. The population in 2021 was 1,408, in an area of 70.05 square kilometres (27.05 mi^{2}). Its municipal seat is in the parish of the same name.

== History ==
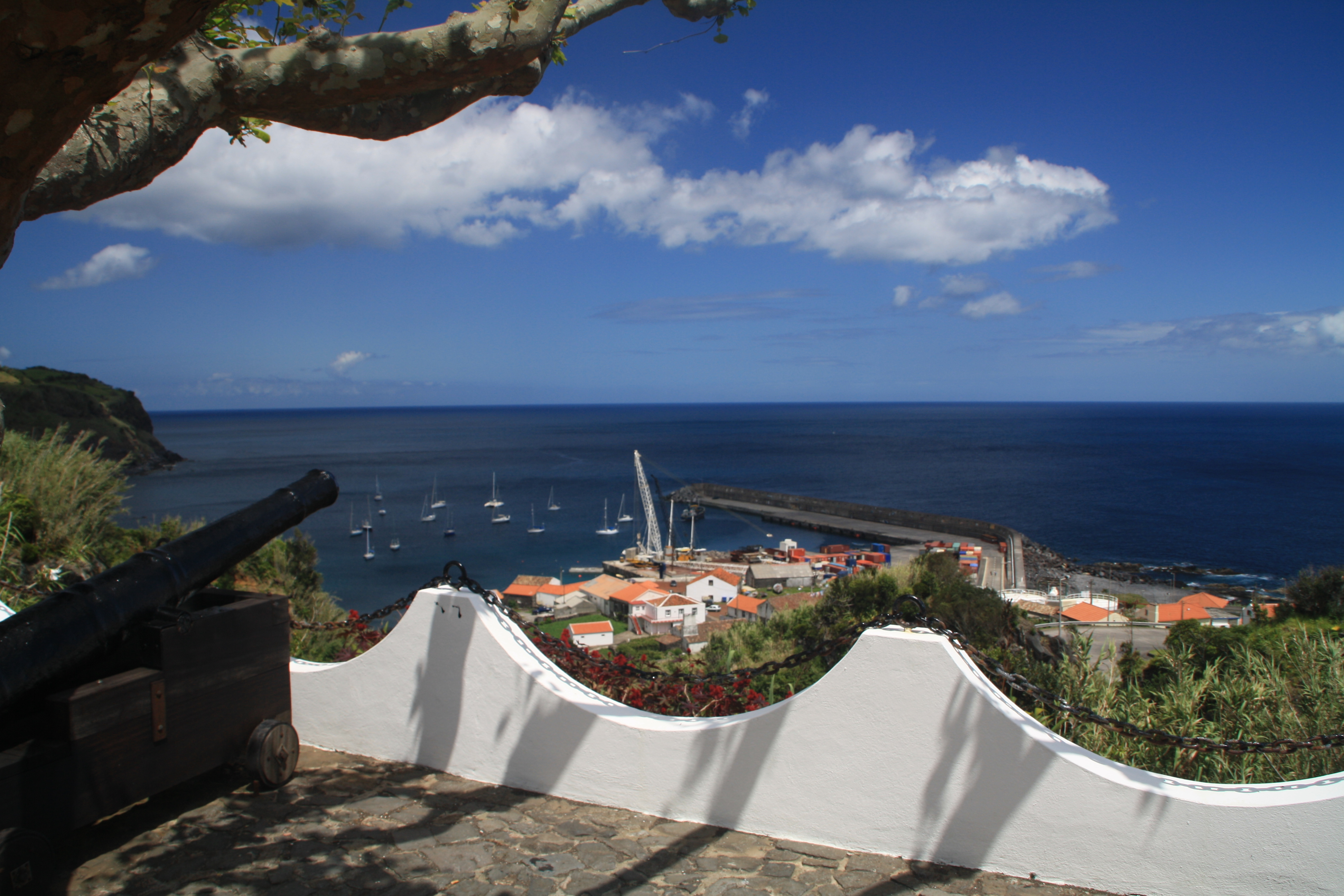
The overlook and former fort that defended the port of Lajes

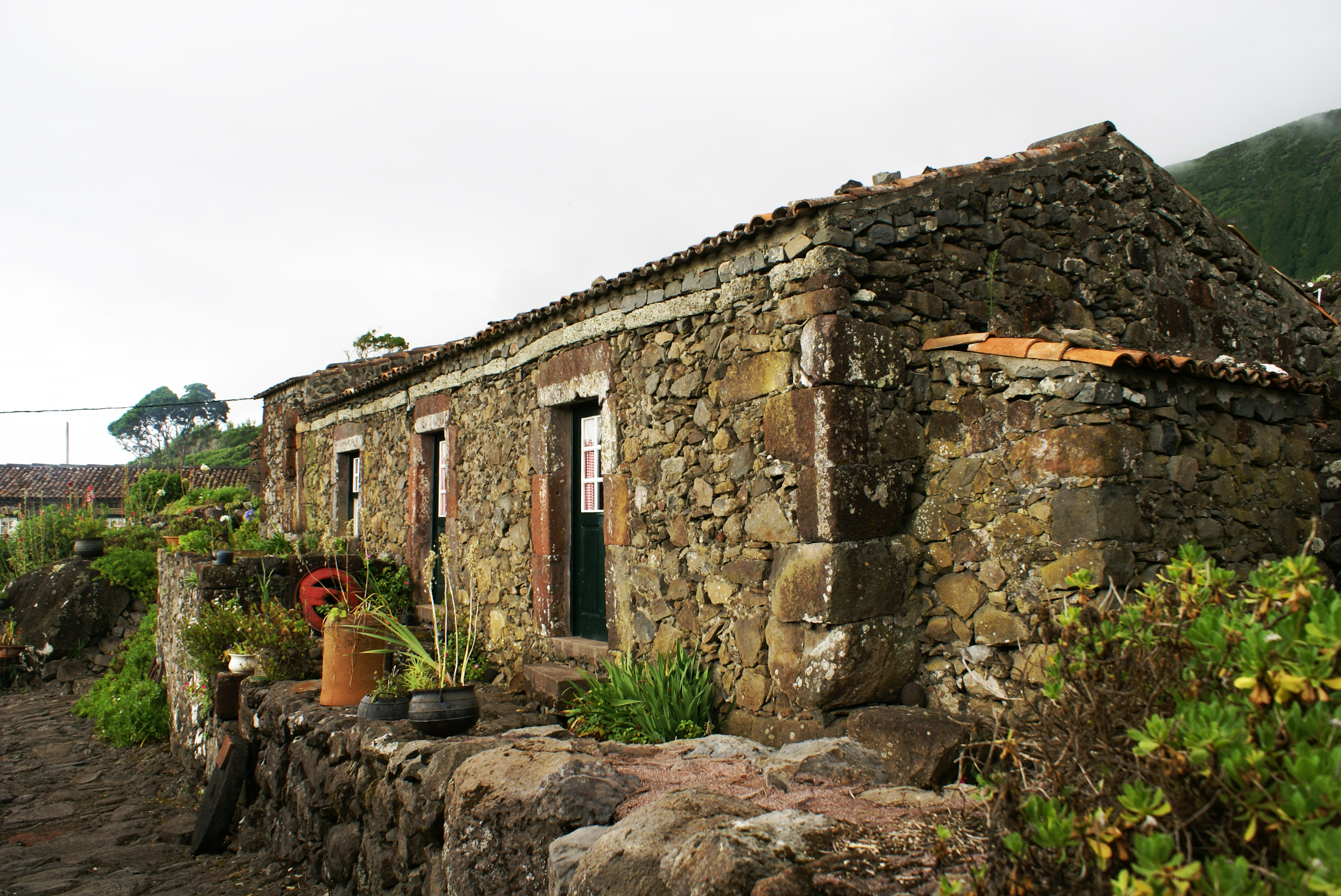
One of the former residences in the village of Cauda

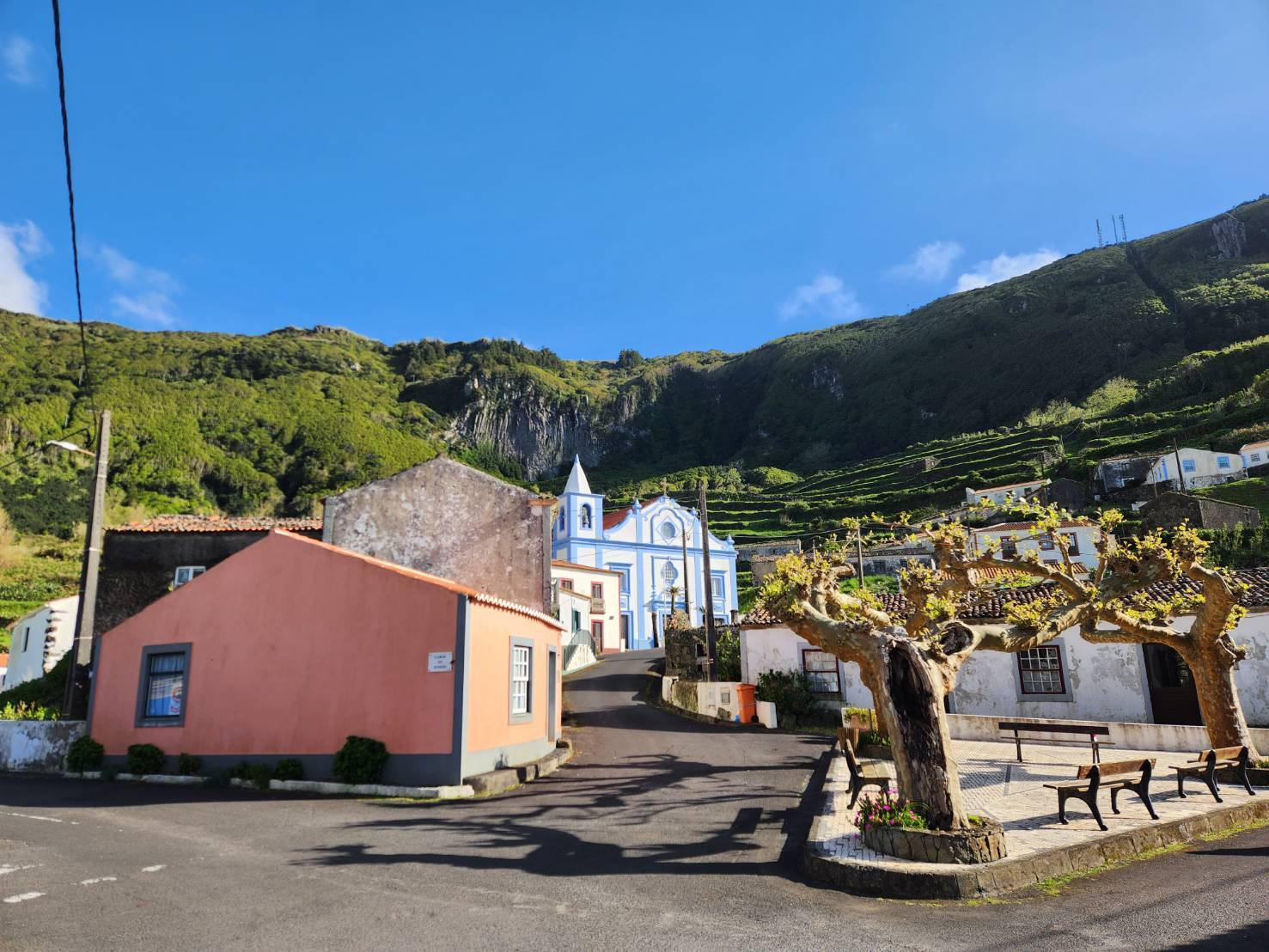
A view of center of the village of Fajãzinha

Flores was discovered by Diogo de Teive and his son, João de Teive, in 1452. Within a year, 20 January 1453, the islands of Corvo Marini (Marine Crows), meaning the islands of Flores and Corvo, was donated to D. Afonso, Duke of Bragança and Count of Barcelso by King Afonso V. On 20 January 1475, João Teive ceded the captaincy to Fernão Teles de Meneses, but by 1 March 1504, the captaincy was donated to João da Fonseca by King Manuel I.

The first documented reference to Lajes was to the first religious parish on the island, to the invocation of Nossa Senhora do Rosário (Our Lady of the Rosary). Lajes, the town, was the first area to be populated in the southern part of the island, around the 16th Century; in 1510, owing to its natural port and growing settlement it prospered, attaining the title of "vila" (town) by 1515 (becoming, some say, the oldest settlement in the Western Group of Azorean islands).

In 1587, the small community was destroyed by English privateers, then when the population was more numerous than in Santa Cruz.

Initially, Lajes das Flores extended from Ribeira da Silva (now part of the parish of Lomba) to Fajã Grande (which included the localities of Lajedo, Fajãzinha, Caldeira, Mosteiro, Fajã Grande and Fazenda). The western places, with the exception of Lajedo, were de-annexed to form the parish of Nossa Senhora dos Fajã, an independent parish in 1676 (and whose seat in Fajãzinha). Fazenda, was eventually de-annexed in 1919.

Around the 19th-Century, due to the rivalries on the small island, and owing to Santa Cruz das Flores' dominance economically and politically, it was undertaken to unify Lajes and Santa Cruz municipalities into one. The Civil Governor of the District of Horta (which included within it the islands of Horta, Flores and Corvo), António José Vieira Santa Rita, in a royal report dated 1869, rationalized that the island could not support two municipalities, and that on the island of Corvo "one administrative parish is enough for the population". Continuing he affirmed that "in actuality, instead of benefitting, the [municipal status] is a burden on the population who would have it alleviated...they find themselves annexed already for falling under...the Municipality of Santa Cruz, and also by the service of the industry and judiciary". On June 26, 1867, then national assembly deputy Martens Ferrão had suggested the same in that "the two islands Flores and Corvo would be constituted as just one municipality, and that it naturally should be her future." In his analysis, José António Vieira Santa Rita also proposed the extinction of Lajes, finding that the residents of the Villa would unfavourably, but that the rest of the southern settlers would tolerate it. The fusion of the municipalities was forced by decrete on November 18, 1895, and published in the official journal the following day, and included the suppression of the municipalities of Lajes and Corvo. This was appreciated and supported by the Municipal government in Santa Cruz das Flores, during this time governed by the "Partido Regenerador (Cartistas)", of which the former Martens Ferrão was a member. This change did not last too long; on January 13, 1898, the Cartistas fell out of favor, and the municipalities were restored: Lajes das Flores, Santa Cruz das Flores and Corvo. This change was welcome to the small bourgeois in Lajes; on March 17, 1898, the restored Municipal Council sent a formal letter of thanks to the Minister of the King, José Luciano de Castro, for "...the autonomy which was disputed by the populous in general in all the municipality". From that session onwards the main square of Lajes was renamed from the plain Largo do Município to Largo do Exmo. Conselheiro José Luciano de Castro.

The establishment of the Telecommunications Station and French Base on the Flores (in 1960), although in Santa Cruz, was an economic benefit to most of the citizens in both municipalities. The first aspect station to arrive in Lajes municipality was the Radionaval Station, which was installed in the Lajes lighthouse (in the centre of town). The lands were expropriated for the station in 1945, although the final inauguration did not occur until 1951. In 1965 the LORAN Station of Flores was completed in the parish of Fazenda.

The completion of the commercial port in Lajes was significant in altering the roadways of the southern municipality, during the mandate of its President/Mayor Albino Cristiano Gomes.

== Geography ==
Situated on the southern maritime coast and extending to the southwest, the municipality of Lajes is one of two administrative divisions of the island of Flores. The southern municipality is more widely populated than its northern neighbour, although settlements within the interior are considered few and scattered on the rugged landscape.

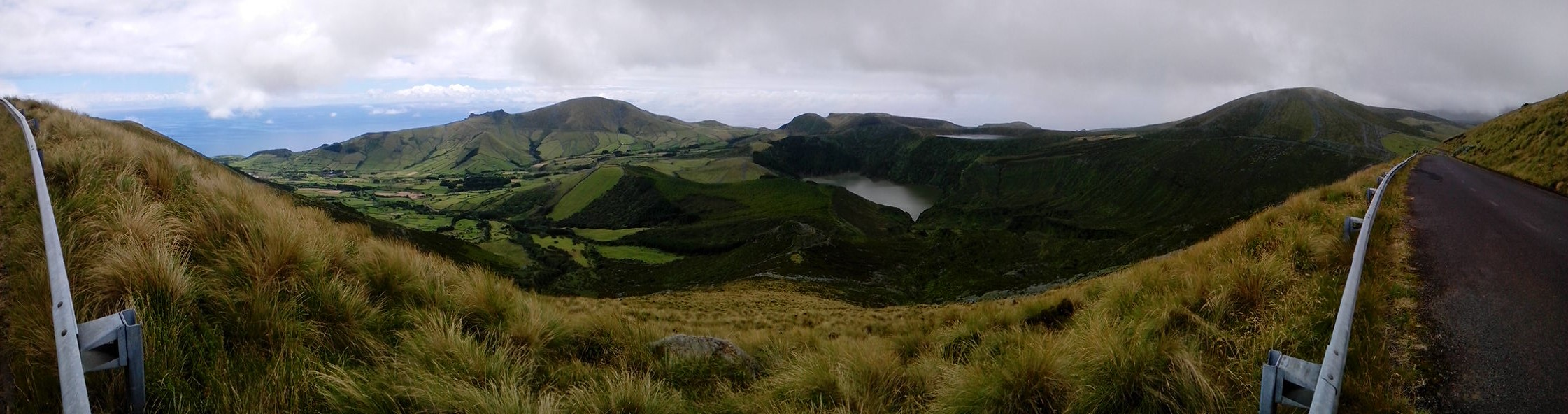
The interior of the island of Flores, showing Lagoa Funda and Lagoa Rasa, in the municipality of Lajes

Lajes is included in the Zona de Protecção Especial da Costa Sul e Sudoeste da ilha das Flores (South and Southwest Coast of Flores Special Protection Zone) as part of the Rede Natura 2000.

The municipality is composed of seven civil parishes (Portuguese: freguesias) with their own administrative organs (Portuguese: Juntas de Freguesia), they include:

- Fajã Grande - located in the basin and fajã on the western coast, with a population of less than 250 inhabitants;
- Fajãzinha - less than 100 residents live in this community, located north of Fajã Grande; Fajãzinha is a diminutive of fajã, referring to it being a small agglomeration of homes in the corner of the fajã;
- Fazenda - literally meaning "commercial goods" or "location where [these] goods are available for sale", it was the last civil parish to be formed (de-annexed from its neighbour in 1919); there less than 300 people living in an area of 29.5 square kilometres (11.4 mi^{2});
- Lajedo - an agricultural community located 9 km from Lajes, and close to one of the islands ex-libris, the Rocha dos Bordões, as well as other natural monuments;
- Lajes das Flores - the seat of the municipal government, located in the southeast coast; largest population center in the municipality;
- Lomba - location of the island's first chapel, and neighbour of the parish of Lajes, Lomba literally represents an area border by river-valleys along the southern coast;
- Mosteiro - the smallest parish in area and density, with less than 50 residents; it is the second smallest center on the island.

The main urban nucleus (Lajes) is implanted in a small area that includes the historical small port and arriba in the southeast, from where the first community of Lajes extending along former footpaths and rural roads. The area is marked by an accented relief of cliffs and mountainous, dominated by patches of forest, alternating with walled pasturelands. Agricultural areas are located between Lajes and Fazenda, situated in the northeast, while the southern coast comprises the Fajã Grande, Fajãzinha, Fazenda, Lajedo, Lajes, Lomba and Mosteiro.

== Economy ==
Lajes economy is driven by agriculture, including dairy production, and a reasonable fishery. In the past, whale-hunting was an aspect of the latter economy, during the 1960-70s, which has since been abandoned, although remnants of this aspect are visible in some of the communities.
