= 1st Regional Legislature (Azores) =

1st Regional Legislature of the Azores I Legislatura da Região Autónoma dos Açores
- I Legislatura da Assembleia Legislativa da Região Autónoma dos Açores

Type
- Type: Unicameral

History
- Founded: April 2, 1976

Leadership
- President: Álvaro Monjardino, PSD since 21 July 1976
- Vice-President: Alberto Madruga da Costa, PSD since 21 July 1976
- Vice-President: Angelino de Almeida Páscoa, PS since 21 July 1976
- Secretary: João Vasco Paica, PSD since 21 July 1976
- Secretary: Suzete Oliveira, PS since 21 July 1976

Structure
- Seats: 43
- Legislative Assembly political groups: People's Party, Movement of Socialist Left, Portuguese Communist Party, Communist Party of the Portuguese Workers, Socialist Party, Social Democratic Party

Elections
- Legislative Assembly voting system: Party-list proportional representation D'Hondt method
- Last Legislative Assembly election: N/A

Motto
- Antes morrer livres que em paz sujeitos (Rather die as free men than be enslaved in peace)

Meeting place
- Sociedade Amor da Pátria; Horta, Faial (Azores), Portugal

Website
- www.alra.pt

1st Regional Legislature (21 July 1976 to 20 October 1980), was the first session of the Regional Assembly and Government of the Autonomous Region of the Azores.

The constitution of the 1st Regional Legislature was written on 27 June 1976. It was only possible since the new Constitution of the Portuguese Republic, approved on 2 April 1976, explicitly allowed for the creation of the Autonomous Region of the Azores, and those governmental institutions necessary to operate the bureaucracy. One of these institutions was the Regional Assembly, which, at the time, was responsible for establishing the government of the Autonomous Region, and included: President Álvaro Monjardino (PSD), Vice-President Alberto Madruga da Costa (PSD), Vice-President Angelino de Almeida Páscoa (PS), and secretaries João Vasco Paica (PSD) and Suzete Oliveira (PS). It was not until September 4, 1976, after the approval of the government, in the presence of the President of the Republic, General Ramalho Eanes, that the first Assembly began its functions.

== History ==
Election Results 21 July 1976
Island	CDS	PS	PSD
Santa Maria	0	1	2
São Miguel	1	5	7
Terceira	0	3	5
Graciosa	0	1	2
São Jorge	1	0	2
Pico	0	1	3
Faial	0	1	3
Corvo	0	1	1
Flores	0	1	1

"It is not without reason, that the first session of the Regional Assembly occurs in this city of Horta...it is good and just, at this crossroads of our history that we reunite here, in a place of peace and open to the world, in this place of refuge and tolerance, where many roads even today cordially cross...where was born the first President of the Portuguese Republic."

On 21 July 1976, Álvaro Monjardino was elected by plenum of the Regional Assembly, the first President of the Azorean Parliament. The preliminary session of the Assembly, which took two days to deliberate, included 43 regional deputies: 27 representing the Social Democratic Party (PSD), 14 from the Socialist Party (PS) and 2 members of the Democratic and Social Centre – People's Party (CDS–PP). The representatives had gathered at the Amor da Pátria building, as no Regional Assembly had yet been constructed.

Representatives of the Assembly were duly elected from 43 electoral districts, with the majority of the seats occupied by members of the Portuguese Social Democrats (PSD). The Social Democrats (PSD), under the leadership of Mota Amaral, became the first Government of the Azores in the 1st Regional Assembly. On the day of the first session, General Altino Pinto de Magalhães, then the President of the Junta Regional of the Azores (effectively the Portuguese governor) and Frank Carlucci, the United States Ambassador in Portugal (the two had administrated the Azores since the summer of 1975 in order to bring stability and provide security), surrendered control of the region's administration to the PSD.

== Regional Government ==
Having established a plurality of the seats cast in the regional elections, the Partido Social Democrata was obligated to form the first regional government. Over time, the Regional Presidency would be established and governed from Ponta Delgada, on the island of São Miguel: the residency of President would be at the Palace of Santanna, and main administrative offices would be located in the center of São José.

The executive, many of which took office on 8 September 1976 (until 20 October 1980), were appointed by decree of the Ministry of the Republic on September 1, 1976, as no formal process had yet been established, and consisted of:

- Presidente (President of the Regional Government):

João Bosco Soares da Mota Amaral;

- Secretário Regional das Finanças (Regional Secretary for Finances):

Raúl Gomes dos Santos;

- Secretário Regional da Administração Pública (Regional Secretary for the Public Administration):

José Mendes Melo Alves;

- Secretário Regional da Educação e Cultura (Regional Secretary for Education and Culture):

José Guilherme Reis Leite;

- Secretário Regional do Trabalho (Regional Secretary for Work):

António Gentil Lagarto;

- Secretário Regional dos Assuntos Sociais (Regional Secretary for Social Issues):

Rui Manuel Miranda de Mesquita, appointed 8 September 1976, but replaced by;
Luís Artur de Figueiredo Falcão de Bettencourt, appointed 2 January 1979, but replaced by;
Maria de Fátima da Silva Oliveira, appointed 17 September 1979;

- Secretário Regional da Agricultura e Pescas (Regional Secretary of Agriculture and Fishing):

Eng. Germano da Silva Domingos, appointed 8 September 1976, but replaced by;
Eng. Téc. Agrário, Ezequiel de Melo Moreira da Silva, appointed 2 January 1979;

- Secretário Regional do Comércio e Indústria (Regional Secretary for Commerce and Industry):

Eng. António Manuel de Medeiros Ferreira, appointed 8 September 1976, but replaced by;
Américo Natalino de Pereira de Viveiros, appointed 1 October 1977;

- Secretário Regional dos Transportes e Turismo (Regional Secretary for Transport and Tourism):

José Pacheco de Almeida, appointed 8 September 1976, but replaced by;
Eng. Manuel António Meireles Martins Mota, appointed 2 January 1979, but replaced by;
Alberto Romão Madruga da Costa, appointed 17 September 1979;

- Secretário Regional do Equipamento Social (Regional Secretary for Social Equipment):

Eng. João Bernardo Pacheco Rodrigues

- Subsecretário Regional Adjunto da Presidência (Under-Secretary and Regional Adjunct to the Presidency):

João Vasco da Luz Botelho de Paiva

- Secretário Regional Adjunto da Presidência (Regional Secretary Adjunct to the Presidency):

Eng. José Gabriel Mendonça Correia da Cunha
