= Convent of Nossa Senhora do Carmo (Horta) =

- Convento de Nossa Senhora do Carmo
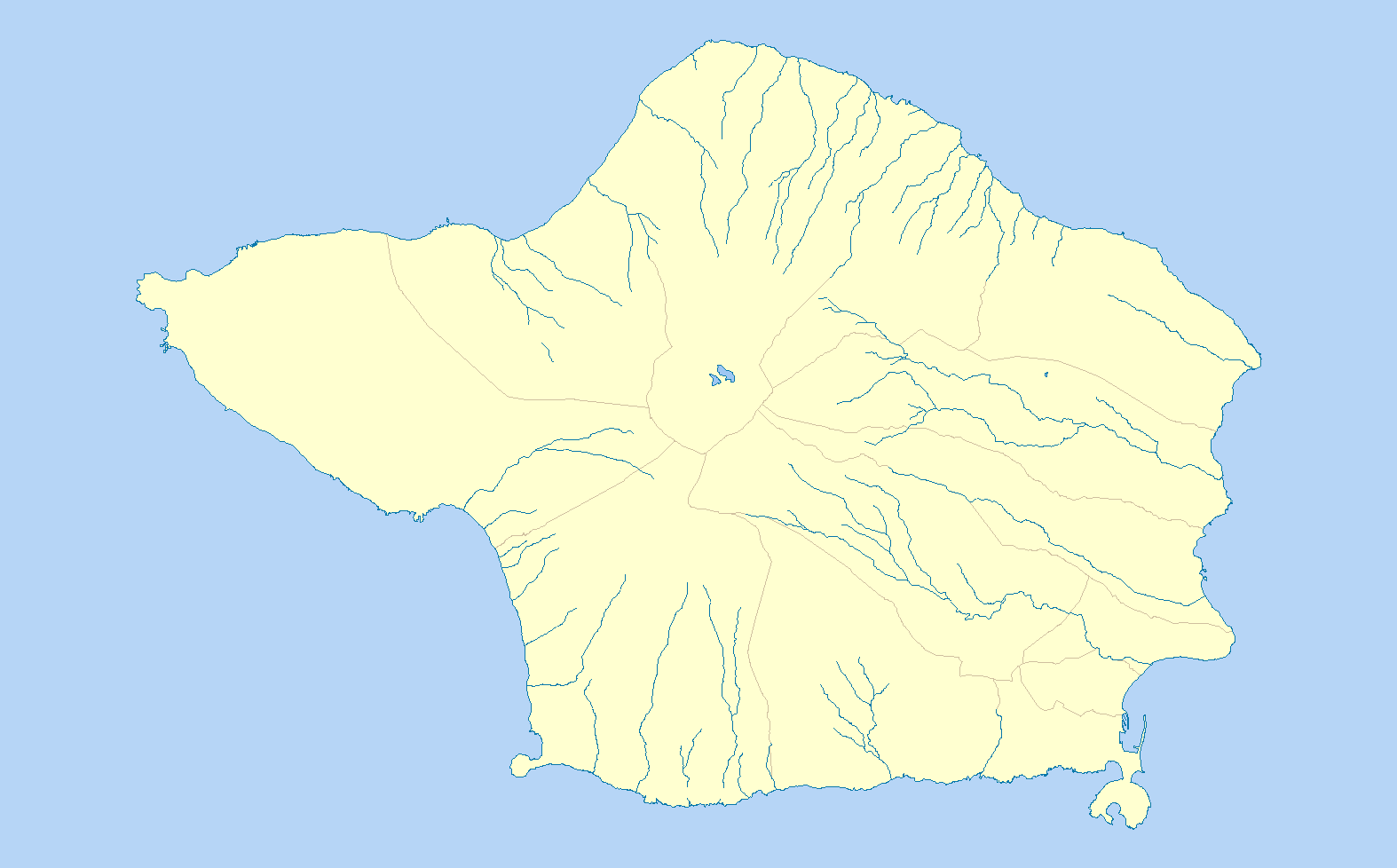
- Location of the convent within the municipality of Horta

General information
- Status: Sacred Art's Museum (Church); Hotel, in the future (Convent)
- Type: Convent, Church, Museum
- Architectural style: Baroque, Rocaille
- Location: Matriz, Horta, Portugal
- Coordinates: 38°32′19.44″N 28°37′43.78″W
- Opened: 17th century
- Owner: Portuguese Republic

Technical details
- Material: Masonry

The Convent of Carmo (Portuguese: Convento do Carmo) is a former-convent situated in the civil parish of Matriz, municipality of Horta in the Portuguese archipelago of the Azores. For several centuries it was one of the several convents that dotted the urban area of the island of Faial, but was damaged during several earthquakes. After the expulsion of the religious orders the convent began a slow decline, and was eventually expropriated by the Portuguese Armed Forces as an administrative post and garrison.

== History ==
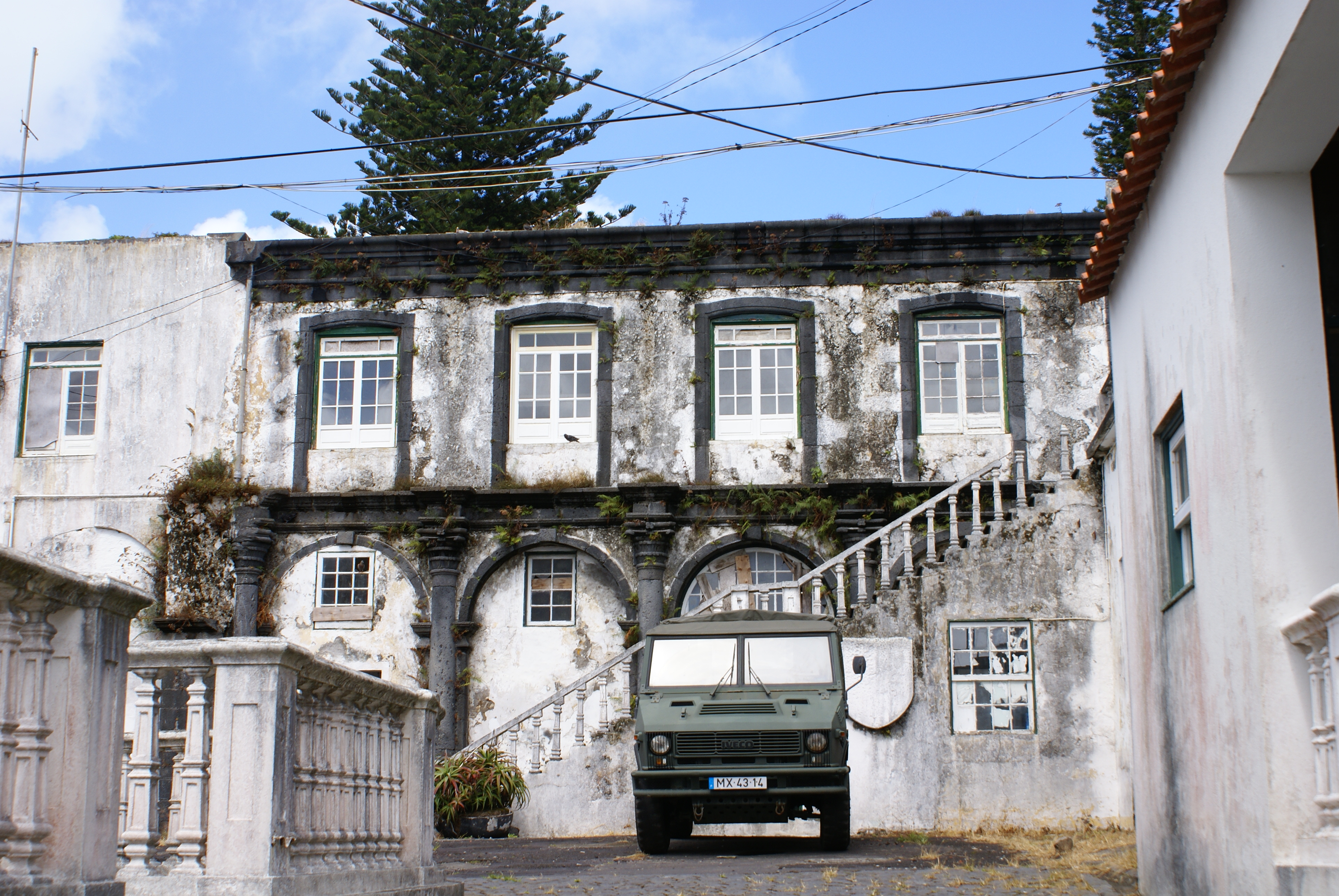
A view of the vaulted archways of the cloister of the former-Convent of Carmo, annexed alongside the Church of Nossa Senhora do Carmo

Its construction began in the 17th century, specifically in 1652, under the influence of D. Helena de Boim, wife of the captain-major Francisco Gil da Silveira.

After the construction of a chapel, dedicated to the invocation of Nossa Senhora da Boa Nova (Our Lady of Good News), D. Helena de Boim decided to create a hospice, in order to lodge Carmelite friars, that included round-trips through the kingdom to the States of Brazil and Maranhão.

To promote the convent, D. Helena de Boim donated her possessions to the Order of the Brothers of Mount Carmel, and lands alongside the chapel in order to begin construction of the monastery, and later the church.

The building evolved considerably throughout the years, primarily due to reconstruction, following several earthquakes that struck Faial over the years. It also affected the churchyard, situated over the centre of town, which was restored, rebuilt and expanded.

Much of the construction resulted from the earthquake that struck the island in 1926. A similar earthquake rocked the islands of the central group on 9 July 1998, provoking destruction in the areas of Ribeirinha, Pedro Miguel, Salão and Cedros, and destroying homes in Castelo Branco (Lombega), Flamengos and Praia do Almoxarife.

The convent was transferred to the Lay Carmelites in 1836, as a consequence of the extinction of the religious orders in Portugal, and owing to the intervention of António de Ávila (later Duke of Ávila e Bolama) the convent was spared, even as other liberals wished to destroy the building.

At the time of its extinction, there were 12 sisters and three studying form admission to the order.

A year later, the convent passed into the possession of the Portuguese State, who installed a garrison and barracks. By the time of the 1926 earthquake its role had changed significantly, and continued in the possession of the Ministry of Defense to the present, functioning as a military post, thereby affecting its use as a tourist landmark.

In 2016, the municipal council and Ministry of National Defense signed a memorandum of intent to integrate the structure into the Revive (Reabilitação de Património e Turismo), a program to requalify 30 public buildings in advance states of degradation, but elevated heritage value, being stated that it will reopen as a 5 star Hotel, with the opening scheduled for around 2022.

The church is since 2021 the headquarters of the Horta's Sacred Art Museum, a museum that holds the largest collection of sacred art in the Azores, with a collection of objects dated since the 13th until the early 20th century, having in display a fine collection of Flemish sculptures and others in the context of local religious institutions and private collections, gilded woodcarvings, portuguese tiles (Azulejo), sacred furniture, liturgical jewellery and furnishings.

== Architecture ==
The church and convent is situated in a courtyard consisting of a large rectangular platform, whose principal access (almost to the front of the principal facade) is along the Travessa do Carmo (a staircase of large cobblestone rises).

The principal facade includes to bell towers and is divided into three floors decorated in cornice. The towers, are delimited by a central section with pilasters, corresponding to the lateral corps and surmounted by bulbous copulas over octagonal base. There are four sections on all floors, with the last one occupied by the belfry. The central part, corresponds to the nave, and there are three sections per floor (with the doorways on the ground floor decorated in archways) and surmounted by a cut frontispiece with decorated tympanum. There is an inscription on the archway entrance to the left part of the church, that reads 1838.

On the same floor as the facade are two porticos that provided access to the primitive convent. To the right lateral facade there is a rectangular corp, one-storey in height, with three sections, decorated in cornice. The left lateral facade (behind the military entranceway the compound) are elements of the old cloister.

The church of the old Convent of Carmo comprises a single nave to a narrower chancel, covered in a vaulted ceiling, and two lateral bodies marked by two chapels. Access the convent and the pulpits are provided from the false transepts. The lateral chapels are surmounted by cornice topped by rectangular openings, with guards). The archways that correspond to the false transepts end at a cornice that mark the beginning of the vaulted ceiling. A high-choir exists on the extreme nave opposite the main altar. Among various retables in gilded woodwork, is the one on the side of the epistole, which have characteristics that Joanino, framed by an investment of figurative azulejo tile that is equally Joanino in character.
