= Luís Garcia =

Portuguese Azorean engineer and politician (born 1971

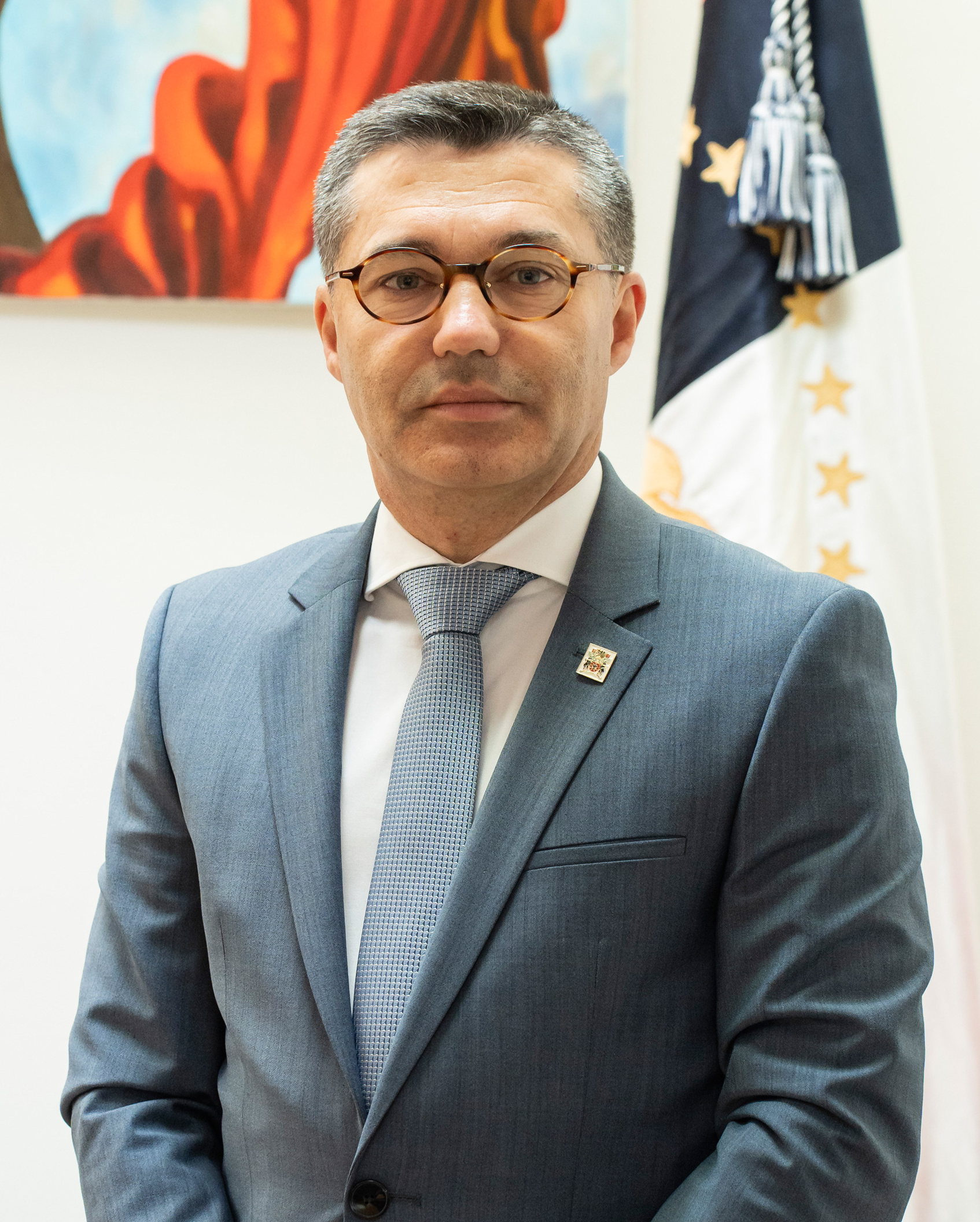
- Garcia in 2020

President of the Legislative Assembly of the Azores
- Incumbent
- Assumed office 16 November 2020
- Preceded by: Ana Luís

Member of the Legislative Assembly of the Azores for Faial
- Incumbent
- Assumed office 17 November 2008
- Constituency: Faial

Personal details
- Born: Luís Carlos Correia Garcia; 25 December 1971 Matriz parish, Horta, Azores
- Party: Social Democratic Party (PSD)
- Education: University of Lisbon

Luís Carlos Correia Garcia (born 25 December 1971) is a Portuguese Azorean engineer, politician, member of the Legislative Assembly of the Azores for the constituency of Faial since 2008, and member of the Social Democratic Party (PSD). He has served as the incumbent President of the Legislative Assembly of the Azores since 16 November 2020 and was re-elected to a second term as assembly president in February 2024.

== Biography ==
Luís Garcia was born on 25 December 1971 in Matriz parish, Horta, on Faial Island in the Azores. He received a bachelor's degree in zootechnics from the University of the Azores and is a member of the Order of Engineers.

In addition to being a member of the Legislative Assembly of the Azores since 2008, Garcia serve as a councilor of the Municipality of Horta for two terms from 2005 until 2009 and again from 2013 until 2017, as well as a member of the Municipal Assembly of Horta from 1999 until 2001.
