= Dionísio Mendes de Sousa =

Portuguese politician and writer (1940–2026)

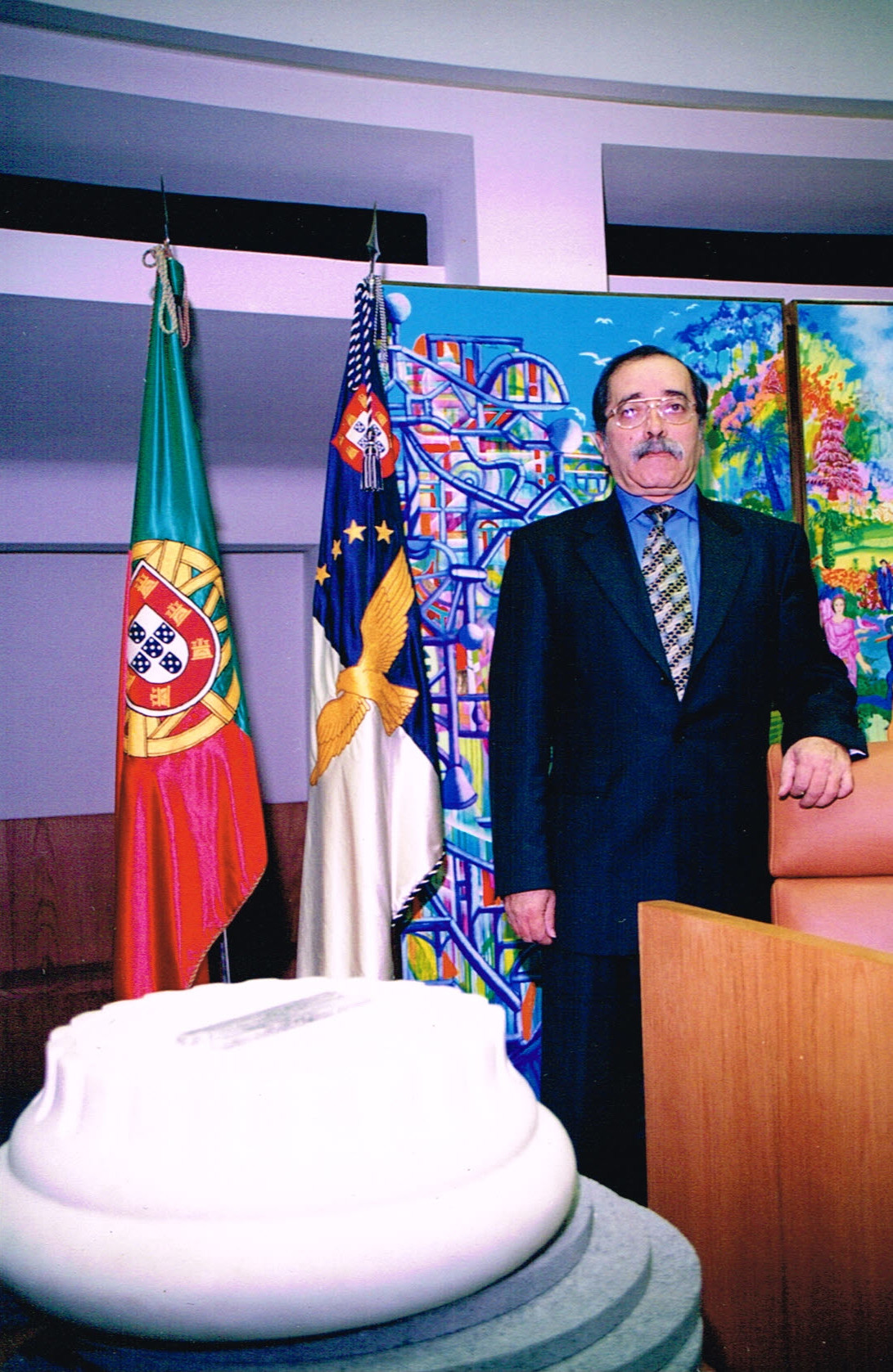

7th President of the Legislative Assembly of the Azores
- In office 1995–1996
- Preceded by: Humberto Melo
- Succeeded by: Humberto Melo
- Constituency: Azores

Personal details
- Born: Dionísio Mendes de Sousa; 9 October 1940 Vila de São Sebastião, Angra do Heroísmo, Azores, Portugal
- Died: 12 November 2026 (aged 86)
- Citizenship: Portuguese
- Party: PS

Dionísio Mendes de Sousa (9 October 1940 – 12 November 2026) was a Portuguese politician, writer and educator, who was President of the Legislative Assembly of the Azores between 1995 and 1996.

== Life and career ==
=== Early life and education ===
Sousa was born in Vila de São Sebastião, Angra do Heroísmo, on the Azorean island of Terceira. Following his primary education, Mendes studied at the Episcopal Seminary in Angra do Heroísmo from October 1952 to June 1964.

=== Academic career ===
Between 1965 and 1968 he was conscripted into mandatory military service and stationed at various military installations, including the main army barracks in Lisbon. During his military service he frequented classes at the Faculty of Letters at the University of Lisbon, obtaining a licentiate diploma in philosophy. By the 1969-70 term, he was teaching history at the secondary school Liceu Padre António Vieira and Portuguese at the Externato Séneca in Lisbon. In 1971 he took courses in pedagogical sciences at the University of Lisbon. Between 1971 and 1974 he participated in night classes as working student at the Instituto Superior de Economia (ISEF) while working as the personnel services director at Transul – Empresa de Transportes in the southern Tagus estuary.

During the 1976-1977 school year he taught psychology and philosophy at the Liceu de Almada secondary school, while during the 1977-1978 school term he was teaching intern at the Liceu Antero de Quental in Ponta Delgada. For the 1978-1979 school year he returned to Terceira, working at the Liceu de Angra do Heroísmo, becoming the president of the executive council there in the 1979-1980 school year.

=== Politician ===
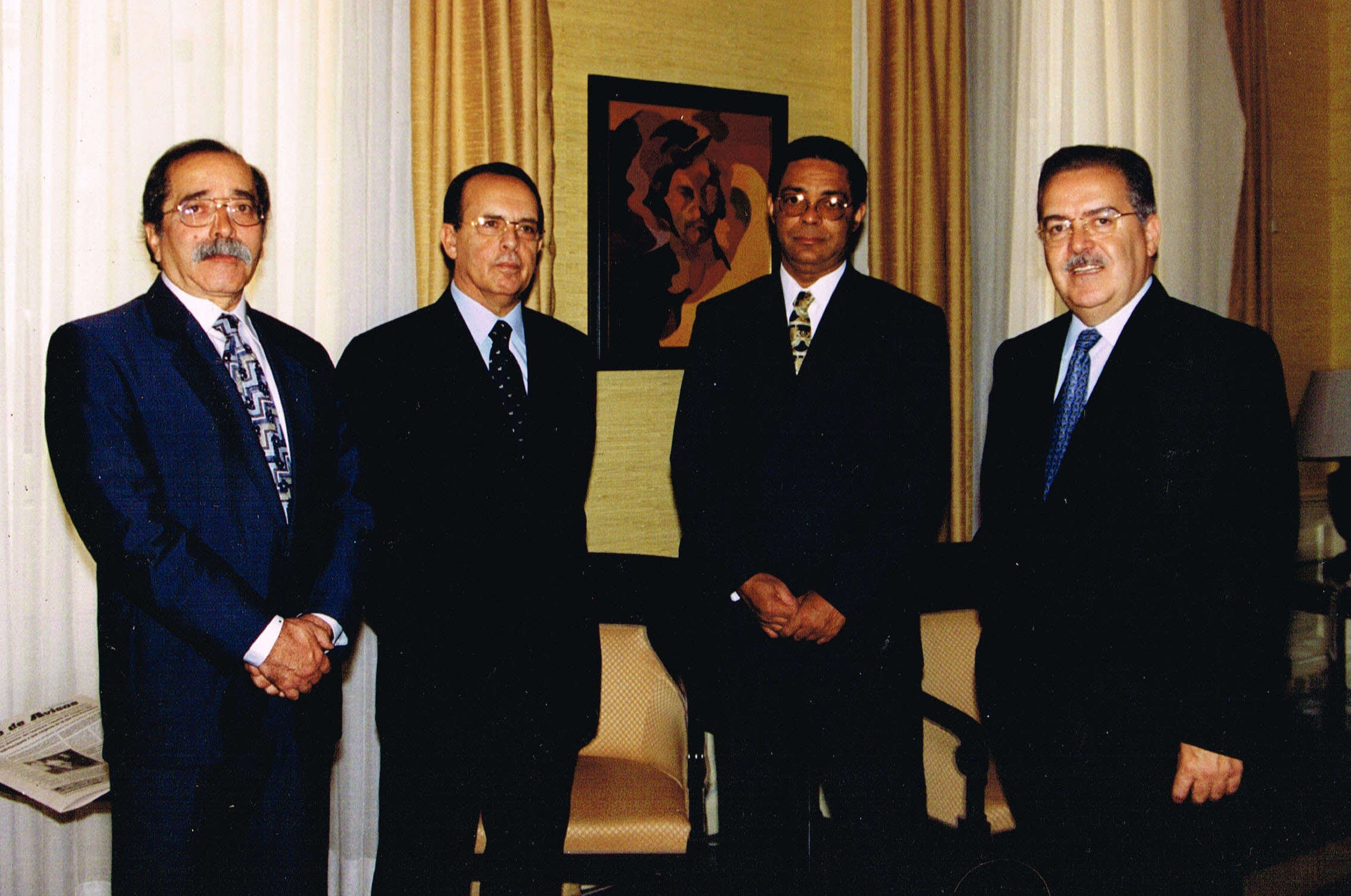
Dionisio Sousa with the Assembly presidents of Madeira, Cape Verde, and the Canary Islands, during the Atlantic Parliament workshops in May 1998

During the regional elections of 5 October 1980 Sousa was elected to the regional Legislative Assembly of the Azores as an independent. In 1982 he became a member of the PS Azores.

Between 1980 and 2004, he served as a regional deputy during six legislatures. He was president of the PS parliamentary group between 1981 and 1992. In various legislatures he was the president of the Permanent Commission of the Regional Assembly on Social and Economic Affairs. Between 1982 and 2004, he exercised various party positions within the PS at the local, regional, and national levels, including regional secretariat of the PS, member of the Regional and National Commissions of the PS, member of the municipal assembly of Angra do Heroísmo, president (for eight years) of the PS parliamentary group, candidate for the municipal council of Angra (1989), and President of the PS Azores.

From 1996 to 1998 he was elected President of the Regional Legislative Assembly of the Azores. On 3 September 2001, he was awarded the Grand Cross of the Order of Prince Henry by former President of the Republic Jorge Sampaio.

From 2002 to 2004 he was president of the Rádio Clube de Angra (Radio Club of Angra) and, in 2004, obtained his pension for his work as secondary school professor. On 11 May 2006 during a meeting of the regional assembly, the assembly unanimously voted to award Dionísio Mendes with the Autonomic Insignia of Valor for his contributions to the Azores.

=== Writer ===
From 1980 Mendes was involved in Azorean newspapers and other media, including A União, Diário Insular, Açores Expresso, Correio dos Açores, and the Projecto Autonómico de Aristides da Mota (31 March 1892) In 2013, he provided the preface and edited the work Testamento Poético ("Poetic Testament") of Coelho de Sousa.

On his own, Dionísio Mendes was responsible for Achegas sobre a Autonomia and Livro de Bagatelas, which were followed on 14 January 2014 by the trimestral publication Boa Nova, the first journal edited in Vila de São Sebastião.

=== Personal life and death ===
Dionísio married Maria Doralice Barcelos Falcão Sousa in 1974. The couple had two children: Ana Rita Falcão de Sousa, and José Duarte Falcão de Sousa.

He was the author of various blogs, including O Ventilhador and Álamo Esguio.

Dionísio died on 12 November 2026, at the age of 86.
