= Church of Santa Bárbara =

Church of Santa Bárbara may refer to:

- Church of Santa Bárbara (Vila do Porto), municipality of Vila do Porto, the Azores
- Church of Santa Bárbara (Horta), municipality of Horta, the Azores
