= Alberto Madruga da Costa =

2nd President of the Azores

2nd President of the Government of the Azores
- In office 20 October 1995 – 9 November 1996
- Preceded by: João Bosco Mota Amaral
- Succeeded by: Carlos César

5th President of the Legislative Assembly of the Azores
- In office 13 September 1991 – 20 October 1995
- Preceded by: Humberto Melo
- Succeeded by: José Guilherme Reis Leite

2nd President of the Legislative Assembly of the Azores
- In office November 1978 – September 1979
- Preceded by: Álvaro Monjardino
- Succeeded by: Álvaro Monjardino

Personal details
- Born: Alberto Romão Madruga da Costa; 15 April 1940 Matriz, Azores, Portugal
- Died: 14 November 2014 (aged 74) Ponta Delgada, Azores, Portugal
- Spouse: Verónica Madruga da Costa
- Education: University of Lisbon; University of Coimbra
- Occupation: Banker, Journalist

Alberto Madruga da Costa GC IH • GC M (15 April 1940 – 14 November 2014) was a businessman, former politician and President of the Legislative Assembly of the Azores from 1978-1979, and again in 1991-1995, including a brief span as President of the Government of the Azores, between 1995-1996.

== Early life ==
Alberto Romão Madruga da Costa was born in the civil parish of Matriz, municipality of Horta in 1940, son of Romão Nunes da Costa and Ema Clotilde Madruga da Silva Costa.

He attended the Liceu Nacional de Horta (National Lyceum of Horta), the national secondary school at that time from 1950 to 1955, before attending similar classes between 1955 and 1957 in Ponta Delgada, at the comparable Liceu Nacional de Ponta Delgada. Later, he frequented German classes in the Faculty of Letters, at the University of Lisbon and University of Coimbra, before taking-up compulsory service on the continent and Angola (between 1965 and 1969).

== Career ==
He began his career in the Banco Português do Atlântico (BPA), the Portuguese Atlantic Bank, where he became manager of the Horta branch, before assuming a similar position at the Banco Comercial Português (BCP), the Portuguese Commercial Bank. Meanwhile, he taught German in his old preparatory school, the Lyceum of Horta.

His early activities in politics, included a term as councilman for the Administrative Council of the city of Horta, between 1974-1975, eventually leading to his presidency in that body from 1975 to 1976, for the Junta Geral of the District of Horta, the post-Carnation Revolution body that administered the local authority.

A member of the Social Democratic Party (PSD), he was first a deputy in the regional assembly of the Azores for the constituency of Faial, during the first through sixth legislative sessions, a career that began in the 1976-1980 term of president Mota Amaral, lasting until 2000. During that time, he was the Vice-President (July 1976-November 1978), then President (November 1978 to September 1979), of the Legislative Assembly during the PSD governments, during two terms: 1978 to 1979, and later, 1991 to 1995. As well as Regional Secretary for Transport and Tourism (until October 1984) in the PSD government, between October 1985 and September 1991, he was, for various times, the parliamentary leader of his party in the assembly, before being re-elected President of the Legislative Assembly on 13 September 1991 (re-elected on 2 November 1992) until October 1995.

=== Presidency of the Azores ===
He was briefly appointed President of the Regional Government of the Azores, following the resignation of Mota Amaral, from 20 October 1995 until 9 November 1996. His tenure was marked by an administration that was low-profile, with little public intervention. For his role as president he was appointed to the State Council, the Superior Council of National Defense, Superior Council for Internal Security and Superior Council for Information by the President of the Portuguese Republic.

== Later life ==
In June 1995 he was presented the Grande Cross of the Order of Merit, and later, in January 2010, he was bestowed the Grande Cross of the Order of the Infante Henrique. By unanimous decision of the Azorean Legislative Assembly, in plenary session on 11 May 2006, Madruga da Costa was presented the Autonomy Insignia of Valor for his contributions to Azorean autonomy.

He was appointed in a non-executive administrator position in the regional electric-producer EDA - Empresa de Electricidade dos Açores, as well as serving as director at the Correio da Horta, between March 2004 and the end of December 2005.
