= Fernando Menezes =

Portuguese politician (1952–2026)

President of the Legislative Assembly of the Azores
- In office November 2000 – 17 November 2008
- Preceded by: Humberto Melo
- Succeeded by: Francisco Coelho

Member of the Legislative Assembly of the Azores
- In office 1992 – 17 November 2008
- Constituency: Faial

Personal details
- Born: 16 April 1952 Matriz parish, Horta, Azores, Portugal
- Died: 21 July 2026 (aged 74) Lisbon, Portugal
- Party: Socialist Party (PS)
- Education: University of Lisbon
- Occupation: Lawyer

Fernando Manuel Machado de Menezes (16 April 1952 – 21 July 2026) was a Portuguese Azorean lawyer and politician, who was a member of the Socialist Party (PS). He served as the President of the Legislative Assembly of the Azores, the regional assembly of the Azores, for two terms from 2000 until 2008 during the VII and VIII legislatures.

== Life and career ==
Menezes was born on 16 April 1952 in Matriz parish, Horta, on Faial Island in the Azores. He received his law degree from the University of Lisbon (Universidade Clássica de Lisboa) and became a lawyer.

He was first elected to the Legislative Assembly of the Azores, representing the Faial constituency, in the 1992 Azorean regional election. He won re-election in 1996 and 2000 and served as leader of the Socialist Party parliamentary group. Following the 2000 regional election, Fernando Menezes was elected President of the Legislative Assembly of the Azores, serving two terms from 2000 until 2008.

Additionally, Menezes served on the Horta Municipal Assembly. Within the Socialist Party (PS), Menezes held the positions of the coordinating secretary of the party's Faial island chapter, vice president of the Azorean branch of the Socialist Party and its regional secretariat, and a member of the PS' National Political Commission.

Menezes also helped revise the constitution and the Political-Administrative Statute of the Autonomous Region of the Azores.

Menezes died in Lisbon on 21 July 2026, at the age of 74.
