= Ana Luís =

Portuguese economist, politician (born 1974)

11th President of the Legislative Assembly of the Azores
- In office 5 November 2012 – 16 November 2020
- President: Aníbal Cavaco Silva; Marcelo Rebelo de Sousa
- Prime Minister: Pedro Passos Coelho; António Costa
- Preceded by: Fransico Coelho
- Succeeded by: Luís Garcia

Member of the Legislative Assembly of the Azores
- Incumbent
- Assumed office 2008
- Constituency: Faial Island

Personal details
- Born: Ana Luísa Pereira Luís; 28 January 1976 (age 50) Horta, Azores, Portugal
- Party: Socialist
- Children: 3

Ana Luísa Pereira Luís (born 28 January 1976) is a Portuguese politician who serves in the Legislative Assembly of the Azores from Faial Island as a member of the Socialist Party since 2008. She was President of the Legislative Assembly from 2012 to 2020, and a member of the Administrative Council in Horta, Azores.

== Early life and education ==
Ana Luísa Pereira Luís was born in Horta, Azores, Portugal, on 28 January 1976. On 30 June 1998, she graduated from college with a degree in economics. She was a financial and human resources manager.

== Career ==
In Horta, Luís was a member of the Administrative Council and director of the chamber of commerce.

In the 2008 election Luís was elected to the Legislative Assembly of the Azores from Faial Island as a member of the Socialist Party. In 2012, she was elected to succeed Francisco Coelho as president of the assembly with 43 votes in favour and 13 against. She was reelected as president in 2016, but after the 2020 election Luís Garcia, a member of the Social Democratic Party, succeeded Luís as president.

During Luís' tenure in the assembly she was a member of the Social Affairs committee. As president of the assembly she was simultaneously president of the Standing committee. She was president of the President of the Board of Directors of the Society for Housing and Infrastructures Promotion and Rehabilitation (SPRHI). She was elected president of the Conference of European Regional Legislative Assemblies on 10 November 2017.

== Personal life ==
Luís is married and is the mother of three children.

== Works cited ==
=== News ===
- "Ana Luís é a nova presidente da Assembleia Legislativa". Açoriano Oriental. 5 November 2012. Archived from the original on 25 June 2025.
- "Ana Luís preside à Assembleia Legislativa dos Açores". Diario de Noticias. 5 November 2012. Archived from the original on 23 July 2018.
- "Elections: José Bolieiro sworn President of the Regional Government – Azores". Portuguese American Journal. 23 November 2020. Archived from the original on 25 June 2025.

=== Web ===
- "Ana Luís Pereira Luís" (PDF). Conference of European Regional Legislative Assemblies. Archived (PDF) from the original on 21 June 2024.
- "Atividade Parlamentar". Legislative Assembly of the Azores. Archived from the original on 25 June 2025.
- "Deputada Ana Luís - Registro Biográfico". Legislative Assembly of the Azores. Archived from the original on 25 June 2025.
- "The President of the Azores Assembly, Ana Luís, elected unanimously as President of CALRE 2018". Conference of European Regional Legislative Assemblies. Archived from the original on 20 February 2024.
