= Presidents of the Legislative Assembly of the Azores =

President of the Legislative Assembly of the Azores
- President da Assembleia dos Açores
- Coat of arms of the Azores

- Flag of the Azores

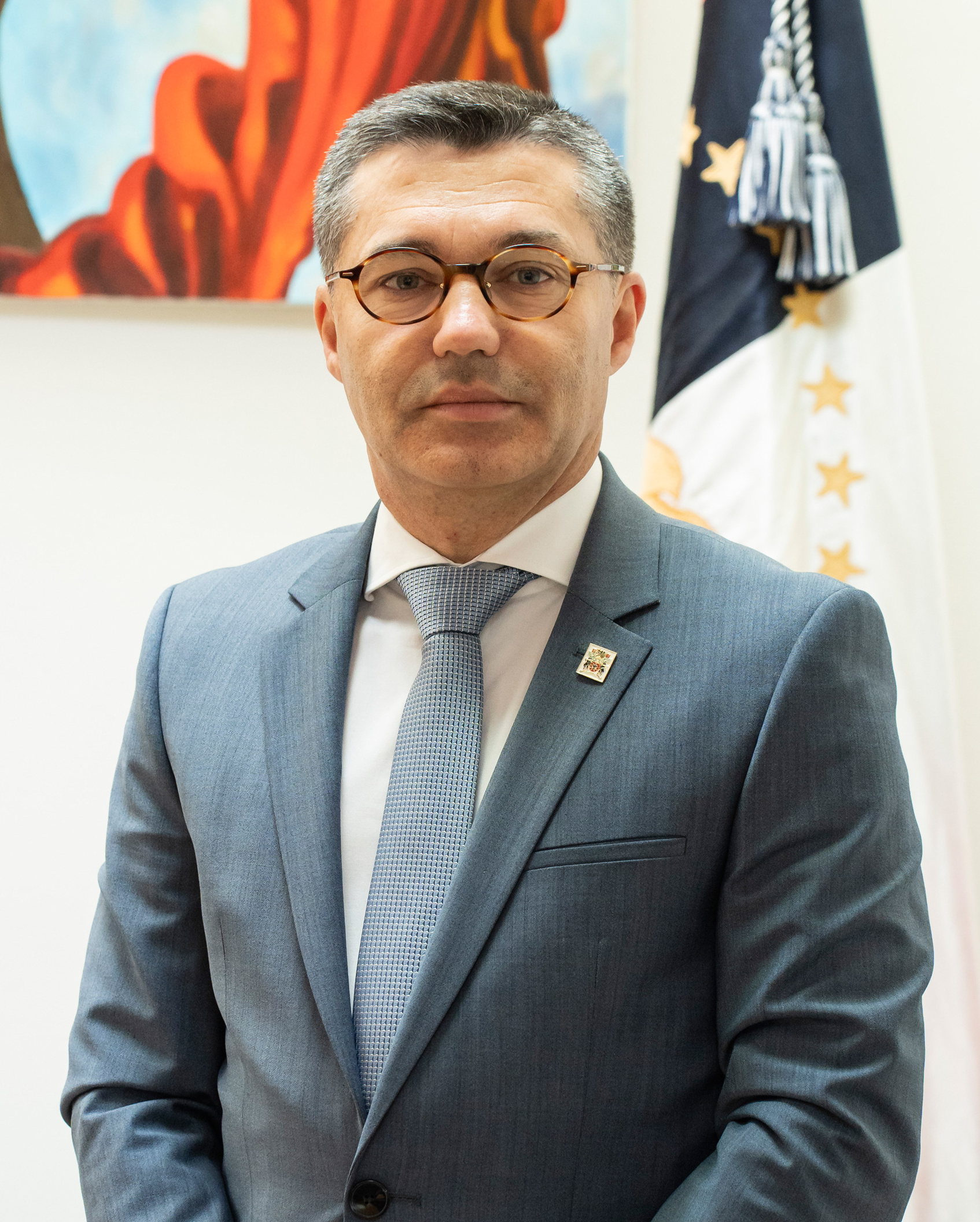
- Incumbent; Luís Garcia since 16 November 2020
- Style: President
- Residence: The Cedars House
- Nominator: Vasco Cordeiro
- Term length: 4 years
- Inaugural holder: Álvaro Monjardino
- Formation: 21 July 1976
- Succession: Alberto Madruga da Costa
- Deputy: Ricardo Cabral (PS); Berta Cabral (PSD)
- Website: http://www.alra.pt/

The list of presidents of the Legislative Assembly of the Azores consists of the chairpersons for the autonomous local legislature of the Azores, since the Carnation Revolution that installed the democratic Third Portuguese Republic. This list includes the leaders of the transitional regimes and those presidents elected after the institutionalization of the autonomy statute that provided the archipelago with its laws and democratic rights.

On 21 July 1976, Álvaro Monjardino was elected by the Regional Assembly, the first President of the Azorean Assembly, nominated by the first President of the Azores (João Bosco Mota Amaral).

== Presidents ==
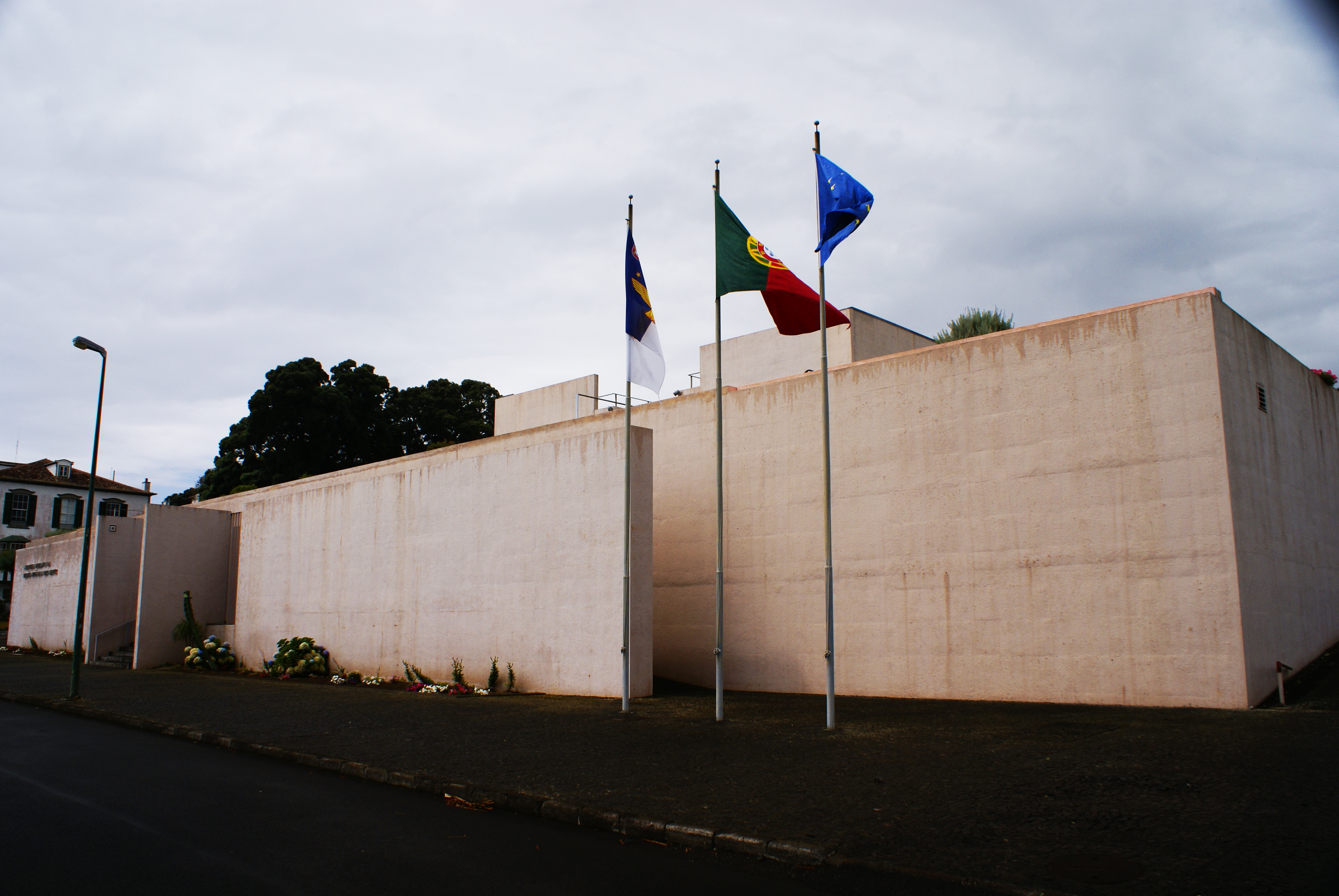
The Legislative Assembly of the Azores on the island of Faial, is the seat of the regional legislature

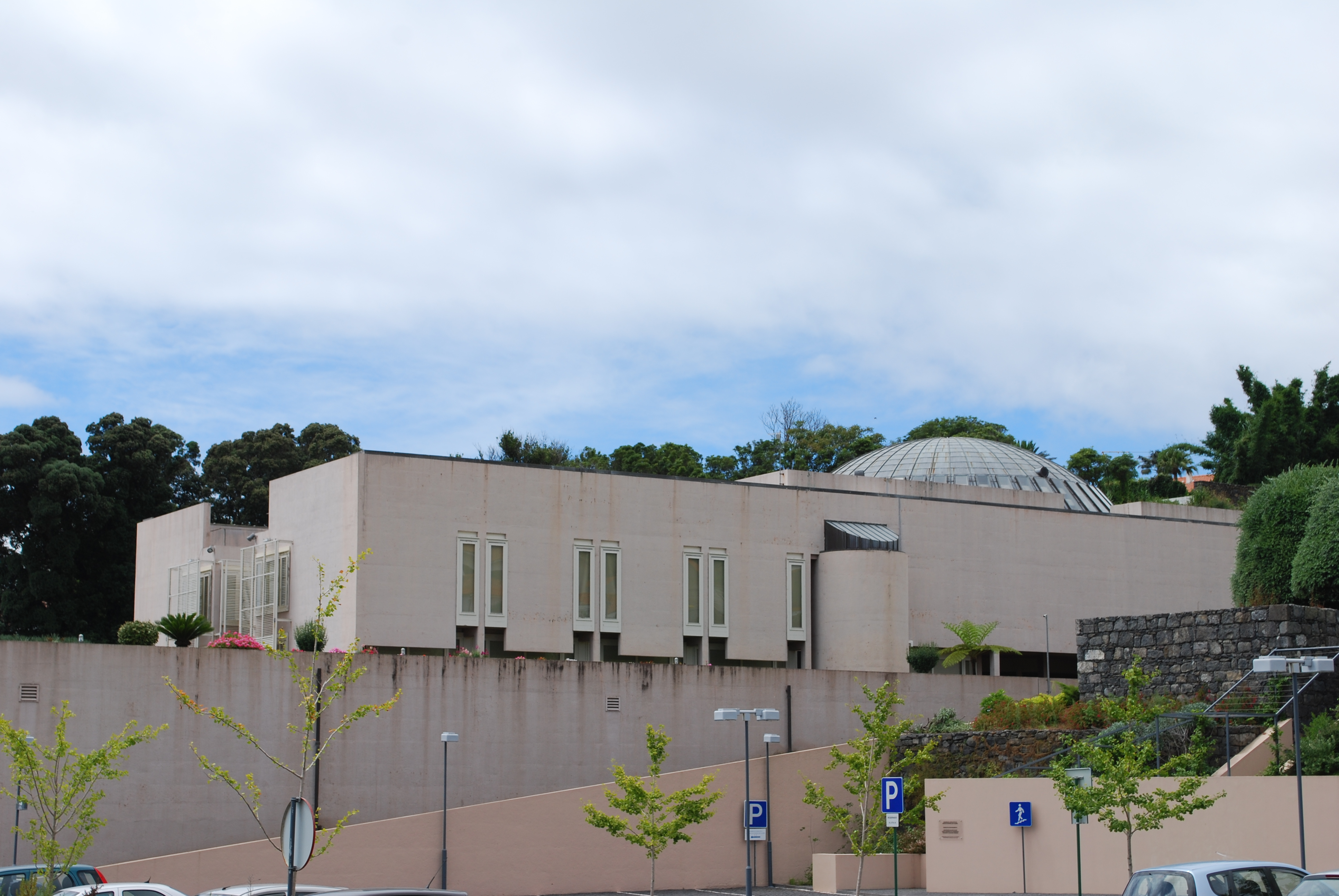
A profile of the legislature, showing the dome where the assembly meets

The numbering reflects the uninterrupted terms in office served by each president.

The current President of the Legislative Assembly of the Azores is Luís Garcia, whose party won the Azorean regional election in February 2024, and was nominated by President José Manuel Bolieiro for the position.

The colors indicate the political affiliation of each President.

Socialist
Social Democratic

Term	No.	Portrait	Name (Lifespan)	Term of office			Party
Term	No.	Portrait	Name (Lifespan)	Start	End	Duration	Party
Regional Legislative Assembly of the Azores (1976–Present)
I	1		Álvaro Monjardino (1930–2024)	1976	1978	~2 years	Social Democratic
II	2		Alberto Madruga da Costa (1940–2014)	1978	1979	~1 year	Social Democratic
III	3		Álvaro Monjardino (1930–2024)	1979	1984	~5 years	Social Democratic
IV	4		José Guilherme Reis Leite (born 1943)	1984	1991	~7 years	Social Democratic
V	5		Alberto Madruga da Costa (1940–2014)	1991	1995	~4 years	Social Democratic
VI	6		Humberto Melo (born 1955)	1995	1996	~1 year	Social Democratic
VII	7		Dionísio Mendes de Sousa (1940–2026)	1996	1998	~2 years	Socialist
VIII	8		Humberto Melo (born 1955)	1998	2000	~2 years	Social Democratic
IX	9		Fernando Menezes (1952–2026)	November 2000	17 November 2008	~8 years	Socialist
X	10		Francisco Coelho (born 1966)	17 November 2008	14 October 2012	3 years, 332 days	Socialist
XI	11		Ana Luís (born 1976)	5 November 2012	16 November 2020	8 years, 11 days	Socialist
XII	12		Luís Garcia (born 1971)	16 November 2020	present	5 years, 363 days	Social Democratic
XIII	12		Luís Garcia (born 1971)	16 November 2020	present	5 years, 363 days	Social Democratic
