= Maria de Fátima Silva de Sequeira Dias =

Maria de Fátima Silva de Sequeira Dias (12 October 1958 – 7 January 2013) was an Azorean historian, author, and academic. A professor in the Department of Management and Economics at the University of the Azores, she specialized in the history of the Azores, an autonomous region of Portugal.

Sequeira Dias was born in Ponta Delgada, Azores. She received her bachelor's degree, master's degree and doctorate from the University of the Azores. Her 1983 doctoral thesis for economic history, "Uma estratégia de sucesso numa economia periférica. A casa Bensaude e os Açores 1800-1873, focused on the Bensaude family, a prominent Azorean business family, won the "Recent Doctoral Research In Economy History Award" for her work. She completed post-doctoral work at universities throughout Europe, including the Institut d' Études Européens at the Université libre de Bruxelles, the Universidade Nova de Lisboa's Faculdade de Ciências Humanas, the Economic History Institute at the Norwegian School of Economics and Business, and the Centre d'Économie Internationale at the University of Geneva.

Much of Sequeira Dias' research centered on the history of the Azores. More specifically, she specialized in the history of Judaism in the Azores, as well as the influence of the Jewish population on the economic development of the islands.

== Death ==
Sequeira Dias died in Ponta Delgada, Azores, Portugal on 7 January 2013, aged 54, from undisclosed causes. She had been conducting research for two forthcoming books at the time of her death: a biography of José de Almeida, a former leader of the Azores Liberation Front (FLA), and a book on the introduction of electricity to the Azores.

== Sample of Works authored ==
- Fábrica de Tabaco Micaelense - 145 anos, 1866-2011 (2011)
- SAAGA – 40 anos de História (2009)
- Os Açores na História de Portugal, séculos XIX e XX (2008)
- António Costa Santos: uma vida ao serviço dos Açores (2007)
- Indiferentes à Diferença. Os judeus nos Açores nos séculos XIX e XX (2007)
- O Ateneu Comercial de Ponta Delgada - cem anos na promoção cívica dos empresários micaelenses (2005)
- Em defesa dos interesses empresariais desde 1835 (2002)
- Uma Estratégia de Sucesso numa Economia Periférica. A Casa Bensaude e os Açores 1800-1871 (1999)
- Diário de Navegação. 50 anos de operação da SATA (1997)
- Uma estratégia de sucesso numa economia periférica. A casa Bensaude e os Açores. 1800-1873 (1996)
- Ponta Delgada - 450 anos de cidade (1996)
- A Fábrica do Tabaco Micaelense, 1866-1995 (1995)
- Escritos sobre História das Mulheres (1995)
