= José Guilherme Reis Leite =

Portuguese politician

4th President of the Legislative Assembly of the Azores
- In office 1984–1991
- President: António Ramalho Eanes; Mário Soares
- Prime Minister: Mário Soares; Aníbal Cavaco Silva
- Preceded by: Álvaro Monjardino
- Constituency: Azores

Personal details
- Born: José Guilherme Reis Leite; 25 December 1943 (age 82) Angra do Heroísmo, Azores, Portugal
- Citizenship: Portuguese
- Party: PSD
- Occupation: Historian
- Profession: Professor

José Guilherme Reis Leite GC IH (Angra do Heroísmo, 25 December 1943 — ), is a professor, historian and Azorean politician, whose functions included his role as Regional Secretary for Education and Culture, deputy and President of the Legislative Assembly of the Azores, in addition to representative for the Azores in the Portuguese National Assembly.

== Career ==
José Guilherme Reis Leite was educated in History at the Faculty of Letters at the University of Lisbon, before obtaining his doctorate in Modern and Contemporary History from the same institution. He completed his dissertation, Política e Administração dos Açores de 1890 a 1910 - O Primeiro Movimento Autonomista (The Politics and Administration of the Azores from 1890 to 1910: The First Autonomy Movement), under the orientation of professor António Henrique de Oliveira Marques.

He became a professor of history at the National Lyceum of Angra do Heroísmo (Portuguese: Liceu Nacional da Angra do Heroísmo), a position which he held until his retirement.

=== Politician ===
Reis Leite became the Secretário Regional da Educação e Cultura (Regional Secretary for Education and Culture) in the first Regional Legislature of president Mota Amaral between 1976 and 1980, as well as the second Legislature (1980–1984). Since 1984, he was a regional deputy in the Legislative Assembly of the Azores, until 1992.

He was a deputy in the Assembly of the Republic for the Azores between 1992 and 1999, at a time member of the Portuguese parliamentary delegation for the Council of Europe (1992–1996) and the Western European Union (1992–1996).

=== Historian ===
José Guilherme Reis Leite is a correspondence member of the Portuguese Academy of History, member of the Geographic Society of Lisbon, the Marine Academy, and correspondence member of the Santa Catarina Historic and Geographic Institute (Brasil). In addition, in the Azores, he is a member of the Cultural Institute of Ponta Delgada, the Cultural Center of Horta, the Azorean Cultural Institute (involved in the executive from 1985 to 1990), the Afonso Chaves Society and the Historical Institute of Terceira (presiding on the executive from 2001 to 2005).

In addition to collaborator in social communication for the Azores, and political commentator, he is a reputed historian and investigator of Azorean history, including works published on the autonomy and evolution of political liberties in the archipelago. He has published several articles in local magazines, colloquies and national/international conferences on the subject, being invited to present at events at the University of the Azores and University of Minho.

=== Later life ===
For his involvement in the political, historical and cultural identity of the Azores and Portugal, he was awarded the Grande Cross of the Order of Prince Henry.

== Published works ==
- Os Fishers - esboço histórico de uma Família Açoriana, Angra do Heroísmo (1978)
- António Cordeiro e uma proposta de Autonomia para os Açores no século XVIII, Angra do Heroísmo (1978)
- A luta pelo Governo Autónomo nos Açores: uma sentença do Desembargo do Paço a favor da Nobreza de Angra, no século XVIII, Angra do Heroísmo (1984)
- As Fontes de Francisco Ferreira Drumond nos Anais da Ilha Terceira, Angra do Heroísmo (1985)
- O códice «529 - Açores» do Arquivo Histórico Ultramarino: A Capitania Geral dos Açores, Angra do Heroísmo (1988)
- José Agostinho, Autonomista Angra do Heroísmo (1988)
