= Church of Santa Bárbara (Horta) =

- Church of Cedros
- Igreja de Santa Bárbara
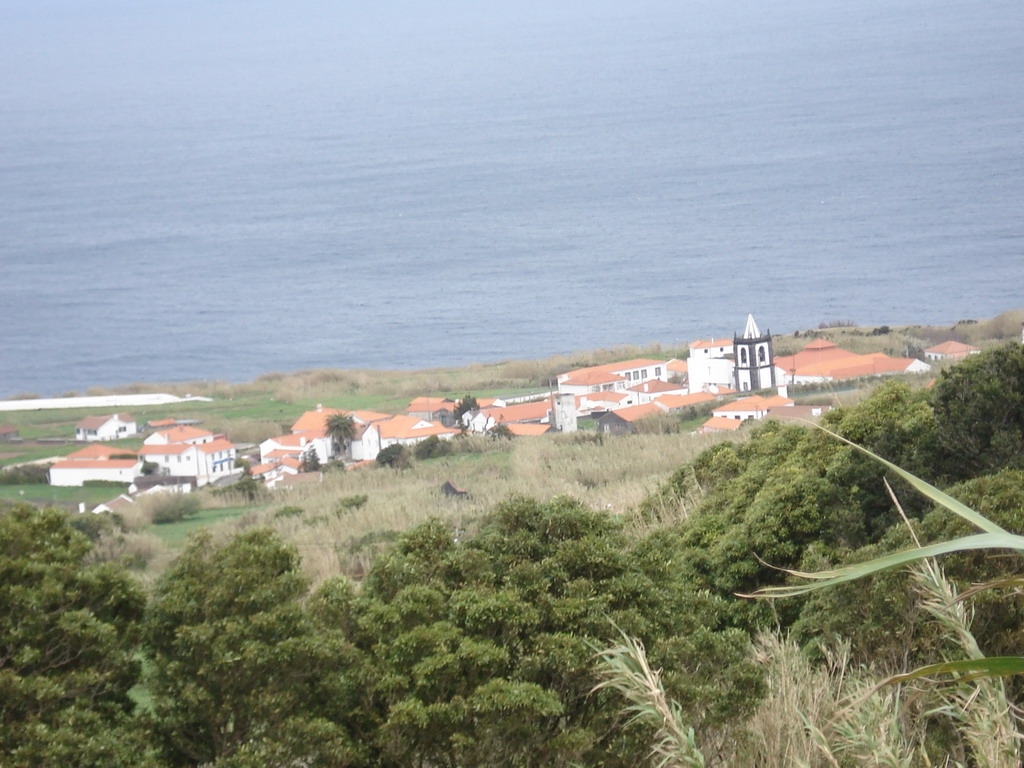
- The Church of Santa Bárbara in the centre of Praça one of the neighborhoods of the rural parish of Cedros
- Church of Santa Bárbara
- 38°38′7.18″N 28°41′35.21″W
- Location: Faial, Central, Azores
- Country: Portugal
- Denomination: Roman Catholic

Architecture
- Style: Manueline, Baroque, Modern

Specifications
- Length: 33.75 m (110.7 ft)
- Width: 24.5 m (80 ft)

Administration
- Diocese: Diocese of Angra

The Church of Santa Bárbara (Portuguese: Igreja de Santa Catarina dos Cedros) is a church in the civil parish of Cedros, municipality of Horta, on the Portuguese island of Faial in the archipelago of the Azores. Its parish falls within the Roman Catholic Diocese of Angra, and serves the parishioners of the northern coast from the border with Salão to Ribeira Funda.

== History ==
The main facade of the church and courtyard from Rua da Igreja, showing its mix of modern and historical elements

The first reference to the church dates to 1594, by Faialense historian Silveira Macedo, who referred to its construction. A lateral inscription over the south portico identifies the date that the lateral chapel was constructed as 1596.

But writer Marcelino Lima suggested that its foundation may have been earlier, quoting Gaspar Frutuoso. During the third quarter of the 16th century, Gaspar Frutuoso writing in his epic chronicle "Saudades da Terra", described the church as a three nave temple, with five columns, one to the left of the entrance.

On 20 November 1971, there was a large fire that destroyed the main nave and lateral chapels. Its reconstruction resulted in an expansion of the space and modernization of the design, but the reinauguration of the temple only occurred in 1977.

Following the 1998 earthquake, the church was damaged, resulting in new renovations.

In October 1999, Helder Manuel de Oliveira, a resident of Castelo Branco, was informed by his sister (who lived in Ribeira Funda) that Father João Antonio Neves (a natural of Prainha, municipality of São Roque), who was parish priest of Castelo Branco, but had become the new parish priest in Cedros, had discovered at the end of September or beginning of October, in the parochial residence, an image of Nossa Senhora do Rosário (Our Lady of the Rosary), which he found under a staircase in a hole. Helder's cousin had informed him that the priest had mentioned that the image was 300 years old, believing it to have been created in the 17th or early 18th century, and which coincided with the death registries that referred to the chapels of Nossa Senhora dos Remédios and Nossa Senhora do Rosário (which were part of the old Church of Santa Bárbara). Since it was custom at the time to have an image of its patron saint in the chapel, and since an image of Our Lady of the Rosary had disappeared, he assumed that the image was that of the original saint, hidden by the then parish priest.

== Architecture ==
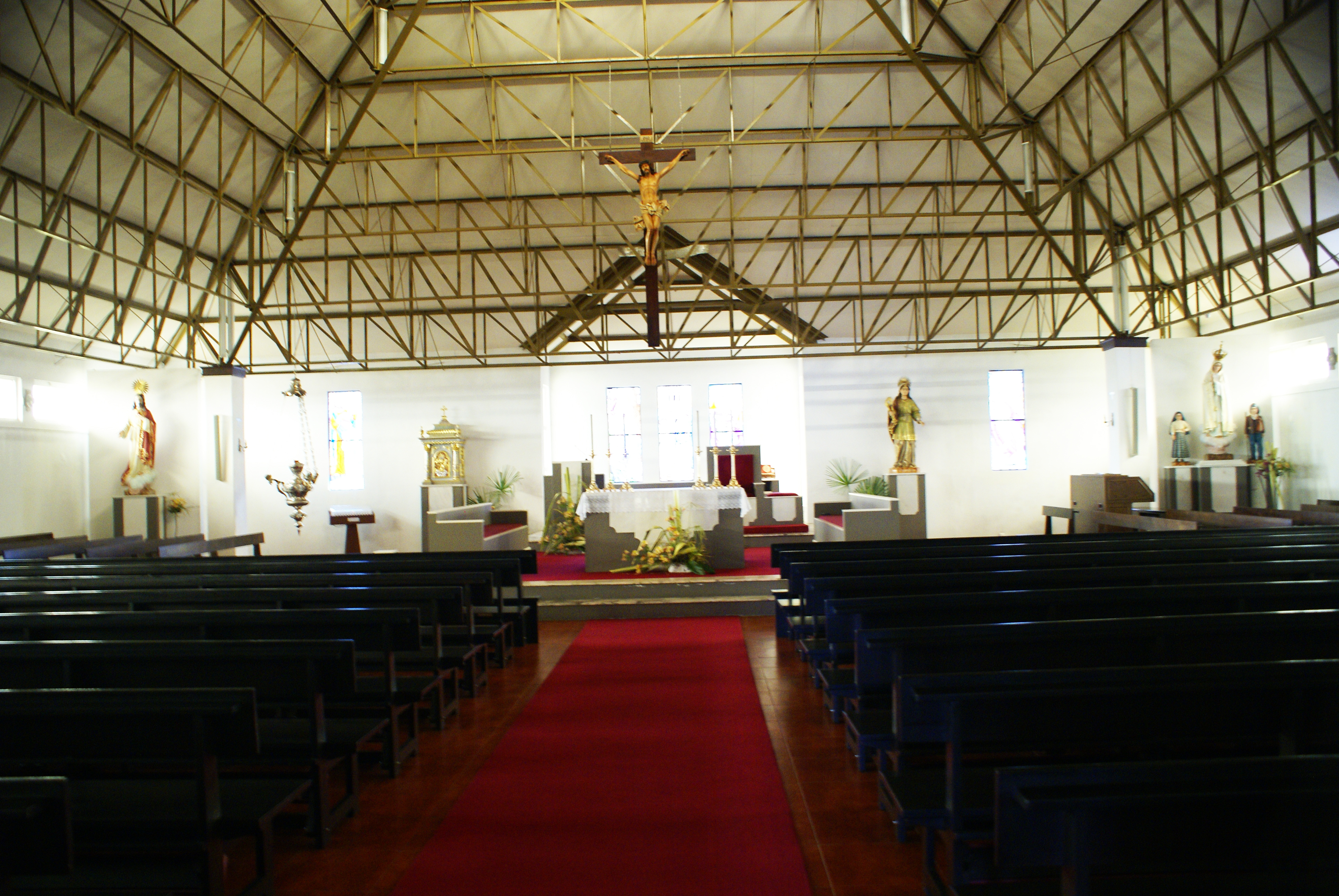
The interior of the modernized church, showing the open concept nave and lattice ceiling

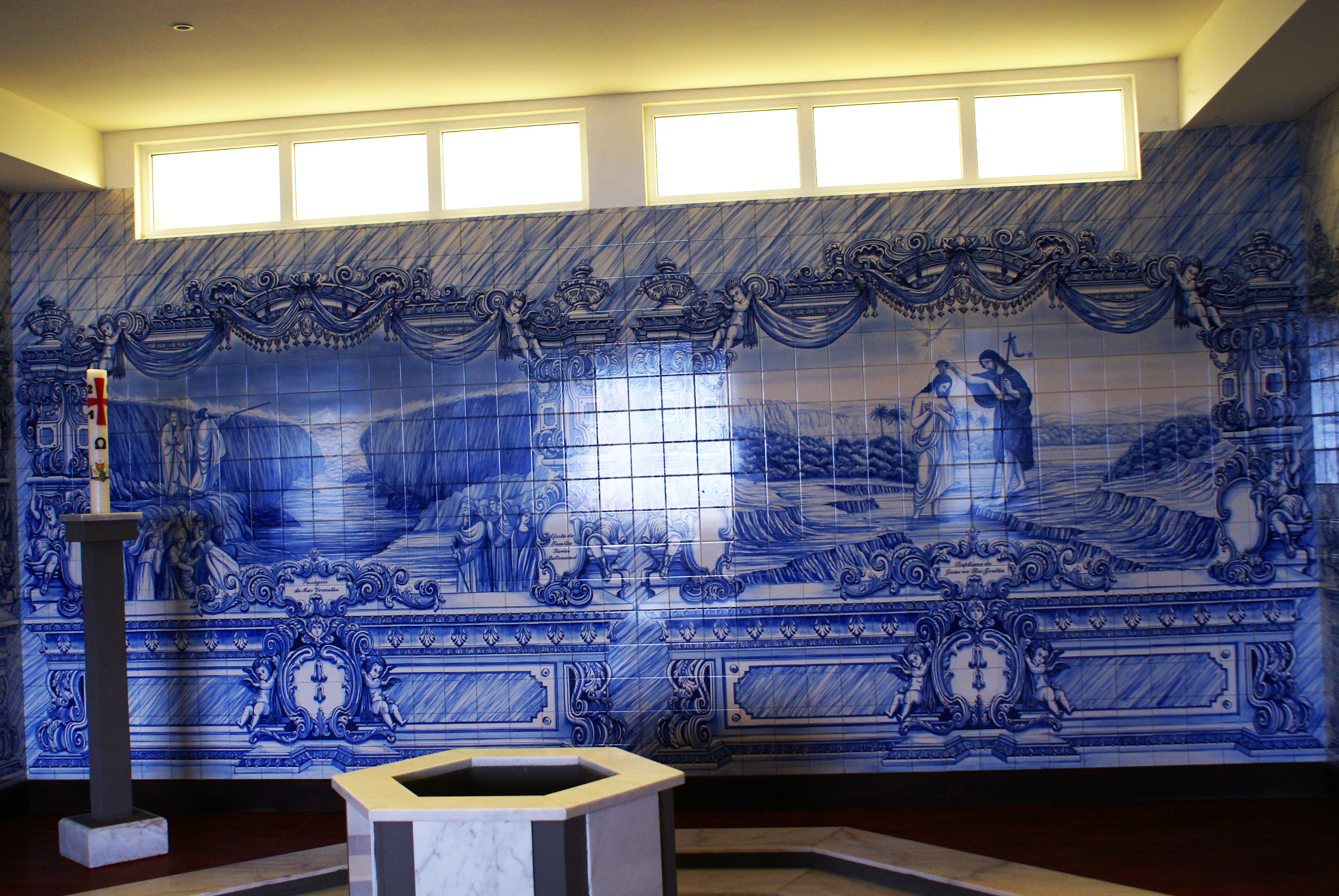
The ornate walls in azulejo tile that comprise the lateral baptismal font space

The church is situated in the locality of Praça, the main agglomeration in the parish, on a rise, accessible from Rua da Igreja. It is fronted by the Museu Etnográfico dos Cedros (Ethnographic Museum of Cedros), instituted by the local Casa do Povo (social centre) to the west and churchyard.

Originally designed on a five nave longitudinal plan, the current model is a simplification and modernization from the first design, with main space, and lateral spaces for sacristy, baptismal font and lateral pius. The design has taken on an eclectic design mixing modernist trends, Manueline elements and Baroque motifs. In the lateral

Over the southern lateral doorway is an inscription stating: "Esta capela fez António Martins em 1596".

The main portal is worked/sculpted basalt, in Roman arch, with three archivolts separated by decorated pilasters. The exterior archivolt is flanked by sculpted pilasters, which extend above each respective capital and end in a floral.

The two-storey rectangular bell-tower includes footers, cornerstones, frames, corners and pinnacles in masonry. The rest of the surface is plastered and painted in white. Dividing each floor are cornices: on the first floor is a rectangular window and the second floor includes four Roman arches with the tower bells. The tower is topped by a pyramidal spire and corner pinnacles.
