= Cedros (Horta) =

- Civil parish
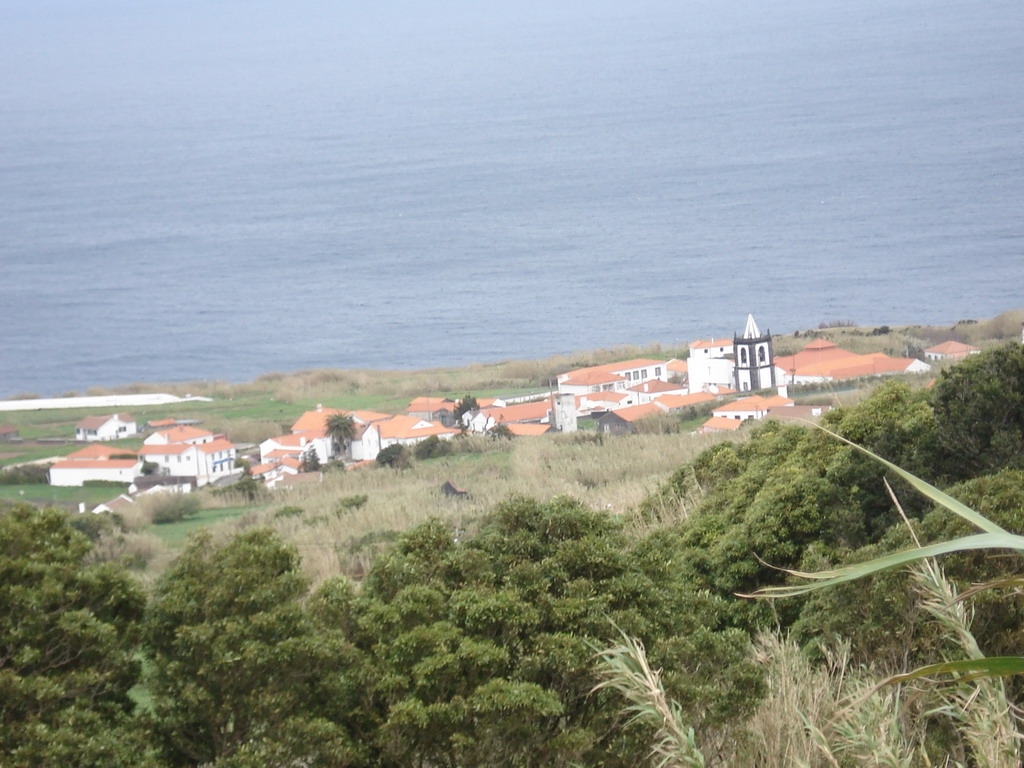
- The main agglomeration in the parish, Praça, as seen from the Santa Bárbara belvedere

- Location of the civil parish of Cedros within the municipality of Horta
- Coordinates: 38°38′3″N 28°41′55″W
- Country: Portugal
- Auton. region: Azores
- Island: Faial
- Municipality: Horta
- Established: Settlement: c. 1594

Area
  - Total: 24.54 km^{2} (9.47 sq mi)
- Elevation: 96 m (315 ft)

Population (2011)
  - Total: 907
  - Density: 37.0/km^{2} (95.7/sq mi)
- Time zone: UTC−01:00 (AZOT)
  - Summer (DST): UTC+00:00 (AZOST)
- Postal code: 9900-341
- Patron: Santa Bárbara
- Website: http://www.cedros-faial.com

Cedros (pronounced [ˈse.dɾuʃ]) is a freguesia ("civil parish") in the northern part of the municipality of Horta on the island of Faial in the Portuguese archipelago of the Azores. The population in 2011 was 907, in an area of 24.5 square kilometres (264,000,000 ft^{2}). The northernmost parish on the island, it is located 19 kilometres (12 mi) northwest of Horta and is linked via the Estrada Regional E.R. 1-1ª roadway to the rest of the island. The tree-covered hills and pasture-lands cover the interior, and hedged farmlands extend to the Atlantic coastline cliffs, a natural plateau above the sea, that was settled by early Flemish and Spanish colonists in the late part of the 15th century. Primarily an agricultural community, the population is comparable in size to other parishes on the island, though this has decreased by half since the 1950s (when there were approximately 2000 inhabitants). Today, it remains an agricultural centre of the island of Faial, anchored by the Cooperativa Agrícola dos Lactícinios do Faial, one of the primary rural industries on the island, responsible for sales of milk, cheese and butter.

== History ==
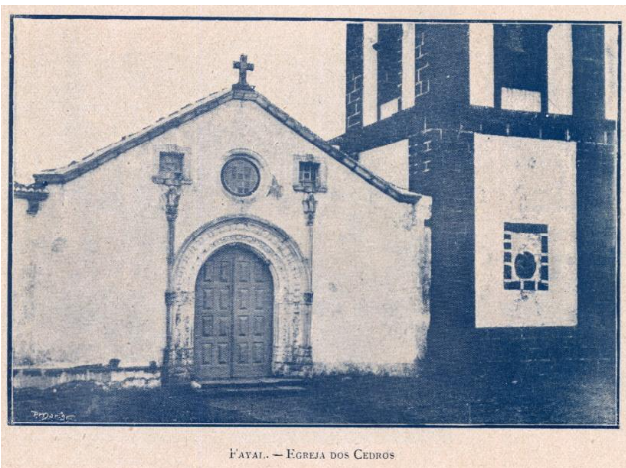
The parochial Church of Santa Bárbara in 1903

The parochial Church of Santa Bárbara, as it currently appears in Praça (the village square) after extensive renovation following the 1971 fire.

The history of the settlement of Cedros was tied to the failure of the Flemish nobleman Josse van Huerter's first expedition in 1466 to the island. Abandoned by Huerter, some members of his failed expedition were joined by settlers from Terceira and Spain whom explored and settled along the northern coast of Faial.

The origin of the name Cedros comes from the local cedars (the Cedros-das-Ilhas or Cedros-do-Mato) found in the pasture-lands and forests of the area (Latin: Juniperus brevifolia). In addition to the cedars, along the numerous river-valleys (especially Ribeira Funda, Ribeira Pinheiro and Ribeira Sousa) they encountered species of Pine, Juniper, flowering plants (such as the family Adoxaceae), laurel (Latin: Laurus azorica), Buckthorn (Latin: Rhamnus), and Ginger Lily (Latin: Hedychium gardnerianum), as well as other broad-leaf plants. Close access to potable water allowed the settlers to develop small tracts of land, build homes of ubiquitous volcanic rock and cultivate a subsistence lifestyle: a few animals (cows, lambs or goats) and a small vegetable garden. The introduction of wheat allowed the development of a small local export industry.

Between 1466 and 1467, Josse van Huerter returned to the island, through the patronage from the Duke of Burgundy. After a failed settlement on the Lomba dos Frades, he established the nucleus of what would become Horta and beginning the first Captaincy of the island. Some of the more adventurous settlers, primarily from the island of Terceira, followed the trails north to the area now known as Santa Bárbara (Praça). These new settlers were more affluent then the original settlers (some even noblemen), who constructed larger, more ornate homes: such as the Castelo da Rocha Negra (or Casa dos Lacerdas dos Cedros), a three-floor house with molded cornices, verandas, and corbels in black volcanic rock.

Father Gaspar Frutuoso, the celebrated Portuguese historian, priest and humanist, best known for his six-part tome Saudades da Terra that documented the genealogy and history of the Azores archipelago, recounted the conflicts, histories and personalities of the region. While, the development of the stain/woad industry and conflict between impresarios Van Huerter and Wilhelm van der Hagen were important events on the island, it was the Fleming Hern Jannequim that created controversies in Cedros. Also known as Arnequim, he caused his own problems by confronting and expelling the Magistrate-of-Justice and then threatening the Captain-General with death, when they prepared to capture him. The conflict was eventually resolved by the King who was bemused by his audacity. Regardless, Flemish influence and importance had slowly begun to decline on the island, and Spanish settlers began to venture to this region.

The village was formally founded in 1594: this date is conjecture, based on evidence found during the reconstruction of the parochial Church of Santa Bárbara following a fire that occurred in November 1971. The church was originally constructed during the Iberian Union, in grand dimensions and in a style different from other churches on Faial (including four bells in the tower). The northern bell was large, and many locals reflected that it could be heard from as far as the base of the island's caldera. A current myth, perpetuated by older residents, involves the disappearance of the bells which, some say, were mysteriously removed and installed at the Sé Cathedral of Angra do Heroísmo, Terceira. An anonymous letter was also sent at one time stating that the bells were buried beside the church, although the bells were never found. Another interesting holdover of the Iberian Union was the enormous silver-plated oil lamp that hung within the church (the only other lamp of similar dimensions was hung in Spain).

By 1643, Friar Diogo das Chagas claimed the parish was inhabited by 2126 people. In 1672, a violent eruption caused an important exodus to Brasil. Also, the end of the Iberian Union, resulted in the expulsion of most of the Spanish living in the parish (which included Salão at the time). Similarly, an epidemic between 1717 and 1718 caused the deaths of many. Yet, the growth of the Carmelite, Jesuit and Franciscan religious orders at about the same time resulted in the growth of the faith community on Faial.

=== Legend of the Moorish Crown of Cedros ===
A legend that dates back to the Philippine dynasty, recalls the time after the fall of Terceira, when the islands of the Azores were occupied by forces of Philip II of Spain. Even before this time the Azores had always been cursed by pirates and privateers, who would attack by surprise during foggy days, under the cover of night or the light of day. They assaulted, robbed and sacked many of the communities along the coast, sometimes conscripting men to work as slaves. As legend tells, a pirate galleon, commanded by a Moorish King attacked the island of Faial, but since the ship was spotted in time, the local population was given time to prepare. The pirates encountered stiff resistance and were forced to retreat without pillaging the homes along the northern coast.

During the course of the retreat, the Moorish King lost his crown (made of silver and adorned with leaf in sparkling metal), after leaving it along a hedge-row while battling the defenders. Along the coast, the King remembered he had left his crown behind, and not wanting to lose his symbol of power, he resolved to return to the island. But, not wanting to be recognized as pirates they returned as local mariners. Not discovering the lost crown where he had left it, the group began to ask around but found no clues to its location. The local people began to get suspicious, and they were obliged to abandon their search and returned to their lands in North Africa, from which they did not return.

Meanwhile, the crown was discovered by a woman from Cedros, who, when she heard that they were searching for it, was suspicious that they were pirates and attempted to hide the crown. She wisely raised her skirt, and placed her leg through the ring-like crown, and passed unbeknownst to the pirates. Realizing the value of the object, and not wanting her contemporaries to know what she had hidden, she continued to wear the crown around her leg until it began to swell and hurt. In the end she informed the towns-people, who attempted to extricate the woman from the crown, washing her leg in water and ash soap to loosen it, but without success. In the end, the residents had no alternative but to cut the crown and later re-solder it cautiously. In the end the crown remained in the parish of Cedros and over time it was used in the feasts to the Divine Holy Spirit. With the passing of time and fearful of damaging such a symbolic and rich object, a copy of the crown was created, and the original was hidden away and guarded. As the legend ends, the crown continues to be guarded every year at the home of the mordomo of the Holy Spirit feasts, and that the cuts are still visible around the crown. It is unknown whether any part of the above story is more than legend.

== Geography ==
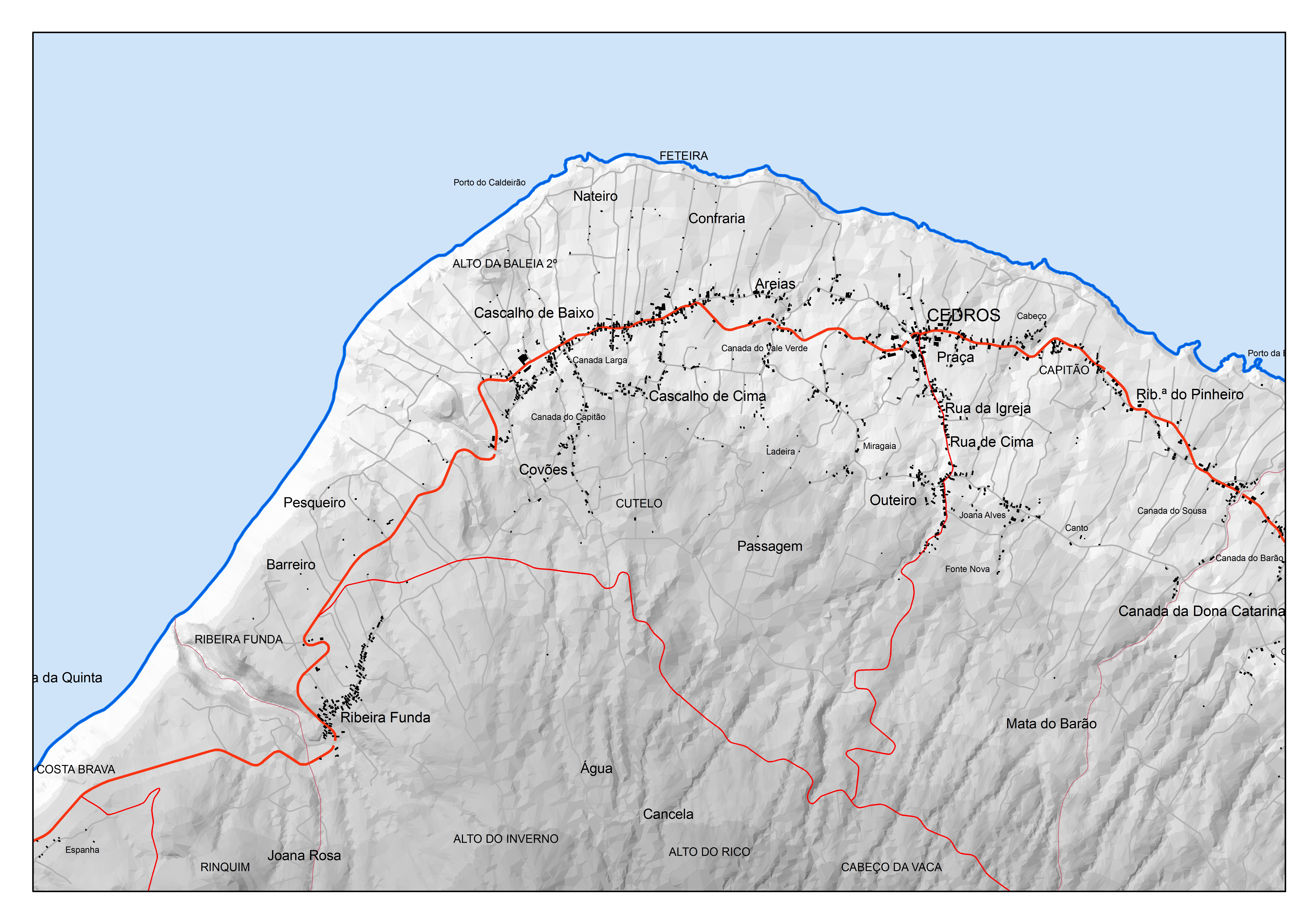
The northern coast of Cedros showing many of the communities and principal agglomerations

Cedros is one of the largest parishes on the island of Faial. It is bordered on the east by Salão and west by Praia do Norte and extends from the coast to the center of the island (and the Caldeira Volcano). Apart from the rich pasture-lands and hedged-fields in Alto do Inverno, Alto do Rigo or Cabeça da Vaca, the coastal cliffs are approximately 75 to 271 metres (246 to 889 ft) above sea level (the highest coastal altitude in this parish being near Ribeira Funda). The region is intersected by several rivers and valley creeks including Ribeira Funda (the Deep Ravine), Ribeira Pinheiro (Pine Ravine) and Ribeira Sousa (Sousa Ravine, named after one of the original settlers), which are usually dry throughout most of the year.

The population is concentrated along the Regional E.R. 1-1a Roadway that circles the island. Praça (village square) is the more urbanized centre of parish, although most places are identified by the smaller neighbourhoods, or localities (Portuguese: lugares), where settlements developed, including Porto de Eira, Cabeço, Cascalho, Covões and Ribeira Funda. Uphill, a secondary road (linked to the E.R. 1-1ª by the Canada da Sousa, Rua de Igreja and Canada do Vale) connects the localities of Canto, Janalves and Miragaia (colloquially known as the Rua de Cima). Each of these places have their own distinctions, and some include their own local pubs, community markets (Portuguese: mercearias) or religious sanctuaries (there are four imperios (temples to the Holy Spirit) in Cedros.

== Economy ==
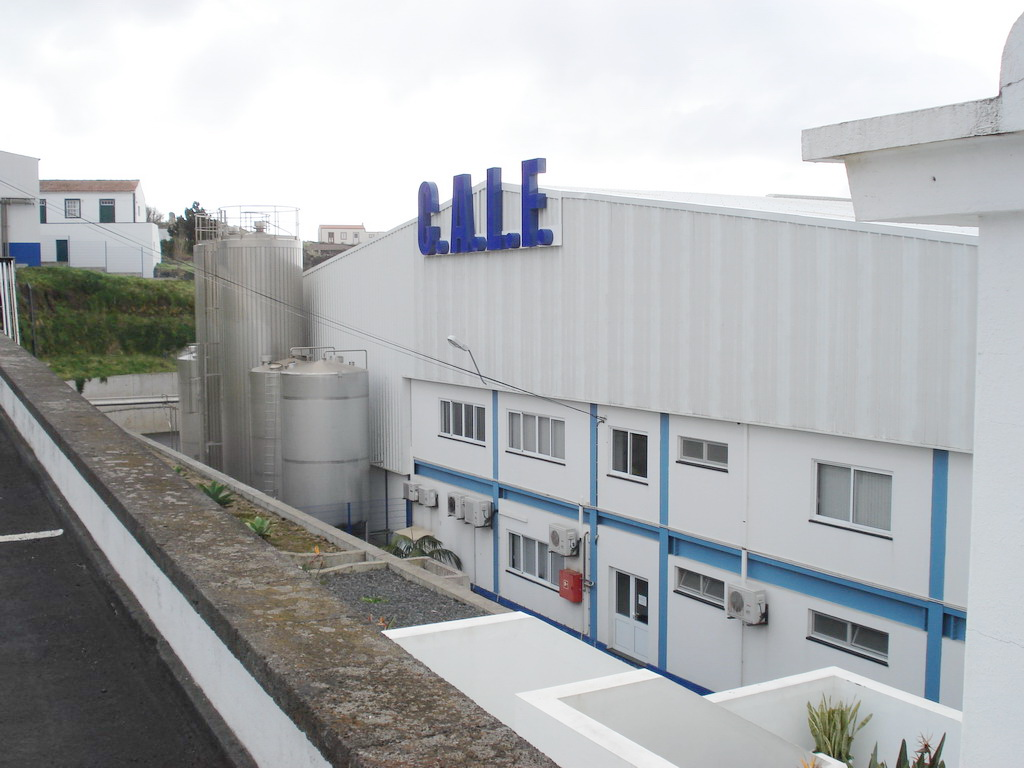
CALF (Cooperativa Agrícola dos Lactícinios do Faial) expanded milk processing facilities, as seen along the E.R. Regional Road

The main economy in this area is agriculture. The soil of the parish is fertile allowing the cultivation of various legumes and grains. Wheat, corn, beans, potatoes and sweet potatoes have been agricultural staples in the region over the decades.

Dairy production has also had an important role in the economy since this northern coast was populated, but it only became an organized industry in the early 1920s. About this time an enterprising couple (Professor Constantino Magno do Amaral and D. Teresa) began a small factory in the area of Rua da Igreja, eventually occupying the building currently "occupied" by Ethnographic Museum (Nulceu Etnográfico dos Cedros) across from the main church. Later, a second firm, Castro, Merrinho & Xavier began operating in Cascalho, along Canada do Inês. José Freitas also developed a small business in Canto da Gatinha, a group of investors started the União dos Lavradores that operated along the regional road, and the União Industrial Cedrenses (locally referred to as "fábrica do Marujo") was also formed in Praça (long after Professor Amaral's operation had ceased). By 1941 many of these operations had been bought or failed and the remaining businesses, Castro, Merrinho & Xavier and União Industrial, were being squeezed by low milk prices. It was then that a group of enterprising farmers, under the counsel of Professor José da Rosa Aica, banded together to form what would eventually be known as the cooperative CALF: the Cooperativa Agrícola dos Lactícinios do Faial. The idea of a cooperative spread quickly in the north of the island through the parishes, and it quickly became the largest enterprise on the island. Castro, Merrinho & Xavier was later purchased by a group from Lisbon to form Lacto Açoreana, it lasted briefly, eventually coming under the control of a Horta businessman and failing. The União Industrial Cedrense was purchased by Martins & Rebello, then the largest milk processor in Portugal, and moved to Cascalho (not too far from the Cooperativo) to occupy the old Castro, Merrinho & Xavier buildings. By 2004, the Cooperative had survived the competition, and restructured its operations to compete in the European market, expanding physically to handle the production. It is the principal business located in Cascalho, and responsible for the production and packaging of cheese and butter under the Ilha Azul label. In Cedros, Martins & Rebello did not survive the century. As part of its customer-driven re-inorientation, the factory once-again reintroduced its store-front cheese shop (abandoned during the late 20th century), and experimented with new variants for restaurants, such as their Moledo table cheese.

Tourism has become the second local industry in the region. "Rural Tourism", highlighted by the Nucleo Etnográfico dos Cedros and several renovated "bed and breakfast"-like cottages, attract visitors to this northern coast village. The museum once included several examples of antique farm implements, equipment and tools used in daily life, as well as some pictures associated with the village and life in 19th-20th centuries. Currently, the museum is in disuse, and most of the exhibits have been placed "in storage".

The area is served by several small shops, including bakery and pastry shop, hair-dressers, mechanical shops, car dealerships, restaurants, and a supermarket opened in 2012, that serves both the local market of Cascalho and nuclear settlements of Cedros, as well as other parishes surrounding the civil parish. The history of the restaurant O Esconderijo has been described recently by the geographer & blogger Christophe Neff in his blog, in the chapter « Nick's Hideway – O Esconderijo » in one of his last posts, retrieving 20 years of geographical research in the Island of Faial.

== Architecture ==
=== Civic ===
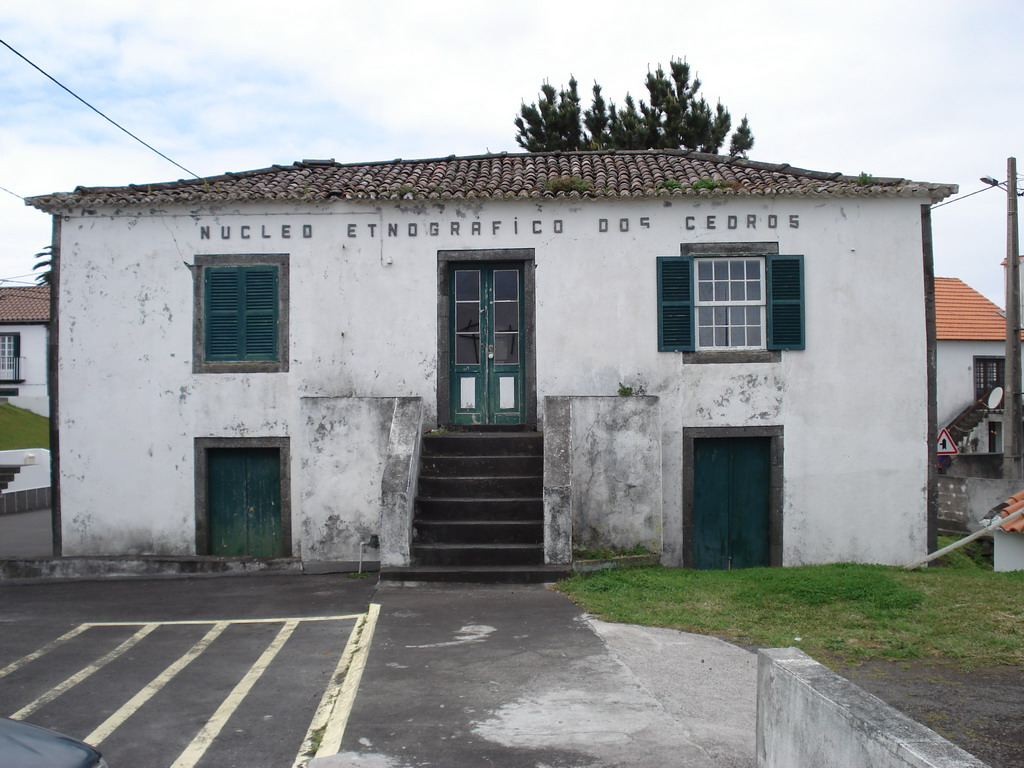
Nucleu Etnográfico dos Cedros (Ethnographic Museum of Cedros); once the second factory used by Constantino Amaral and D. Teresa in their dairy business in Cedros

- Casa do Capitão (House of the Captain) - located along the Canada do Capitão, mostly in ruins, this building was the Captain-major's house in the parish (although it is unclear whether he resided here for any length of time); it is a two-story rectangular house constructed of volcanic rock, which still retains a front facade, with access to the second story made by outside staircase or interior ladder;
- Museu Etnográfico dos Cedros (Ethnographic Museum of Cedros) - site of one of the first dairy factories, and currently unused, although it once housed exhibits from the communities's past;
- Casa dos Lacerdas dos Cedros/Castelo da Rocha Negra (House of the Lacerdas or Castle of the Black Cliffrock) - one of the examples from Cedros history or a nobleman's home, it is an ornate building with worked black rock;
- Moinho de Vento (Canada do Capitão) - one of many windmills on the island, it dates back to the beginning of the 20th century, constructed of wood over a rock base, covered with a conic structure caped with a zinc-metal roof, with wooden ladder;
- Moinho de Vento (Cascalho de Baixo) - a windmill dating back to the beginning of the 20th century, with major remodeling by Cooperative and landmark of Cascalho; constructed of wood over a rock base, covered with a conic structure caped with a zinc-metal roof, with wooden ladder. central windmill owned by Cooperative and landmark of Cascalho.

=== Religious ===
- Igreja de Nossa Senhora de Fátima (Church of Our Lady of Fatima) - located outside of Ribeira Funda, this church consists of a single nave, small narrow chapel and a central tower on the front facade constructed of local volcanic stone. The tower, a reinforced structure, is surmounted by a hexagonal pyramid and cross, with a tower clock in three of four faces. Access to the church is made by two symmetrical winding staircases.
- Igreja de Santa Bárbara (Church of Santa Bárbara), the parochial church located in Praça, an eclectic mix of Manueline, Baroque and Modern architecture resulting from a reconstruction, caused by the 1971 fire that destroyed the original structure.
