= Álvaro Monjardino =

Portuguese politician (1930–2024)

President of the Legislative Assembly of the Azores
- In office 1979–1984
- President: João Bosco Mota Amaral
- Preceded by: Alberto Madruga da Costa
- Succeeded by: José Guilherme Reis Leite
- In office 1976–1978
- President: João Bosco Mota Amaral
- Preceded by: Humberto Melo
- Succeeded by: José Guilherme Reis Leite

Personal details
- Born: Álvaro Pereira da Silva Leal Monjardino; 6 October 1930 Angra do Heroísmo, Portugal
- Died: 16 August 2024 (aged 93)
- Citizenship: Portuguese

Álvaro Monjardino (6 October 1930 – 16 August 2024) was a Portuguese lawyer and politician.

== Early life ==
Monjardino attained his Licenciatura in Law, as well as the Curso Complementar de Ciências Jurídicas (Complimentary Course in Judicial Sciences) before beginning his career in politics.

== Career ==
Monjardino was elected as an independent deputy for the National Assembly in the Estado Novo regime, under the banner of the ANP, for the district of Angra do Heroísmo, between 1973 and 1974.

He joined the Junta Regional dos Açores (Regional Junta of the Azores) in the Social Democratic (PSD) party, elected for the constituencies of Graciosa and, later Terceira.

He became the first and third elected presidents of the Legislative Assembly of the Azores, between 1976 and 1984, with a pause between 1978 and 1979, when he occupied the position of Minister Adjunct to the Prime Minister, during the Fourth Constitutional Government, between 1978 and 1979. He would return to hold the position of president of the Regional Assembly from 1979 to 1984.

== Later life and death ==
Monjardino was described as a historian and studious investigator in judicial matters, publishing various documents on the subject. At one time he was president of the council of the Instituto Histórico da Ilha Terceira (1984–1999), as well as a correspondence partner of the Portuguese Academy of History. He was one of the principals involved in the classification of the historical centre of Angra do Heroísmo as a World Heritage Site by UNESCO.

He was a director, collaborator and correspondent for the daily newspaper A União.

He maintained a law office in the old city and was an administrator/director of several businesses.

Monjardino died on 16 August 2024, at the age of 93.
