= Diário Insular =

Portuguese newspaper

- Type: Daily newspaper
- Format: Berliner
- Owner: Sociedade Terceirense de Publicidade
- Founder: Cândido Pamplona Forjaz
- Publisher: Oficinas gráficas da Sociedade Terceirense de Publicidade, Lda.
- Editor-in-chief: A. Mendes
- Editor: José Lourenço
- Photo editor: António Araújo, Rodrigo Bento, João Costa, Fausto Costa, Pedro Alves
- Founded: 1946
- Language: Portuguese
- Headquarters: Avenida Infante D. Henrique, 1 Angra do Heroísmo (Azores), Portugal

Diário Insular (Island Daily) is a Portuguese newspaper, published daily from Angra do Heroísmo, island of Terceira in the archipelago of the Azores.

== History ==
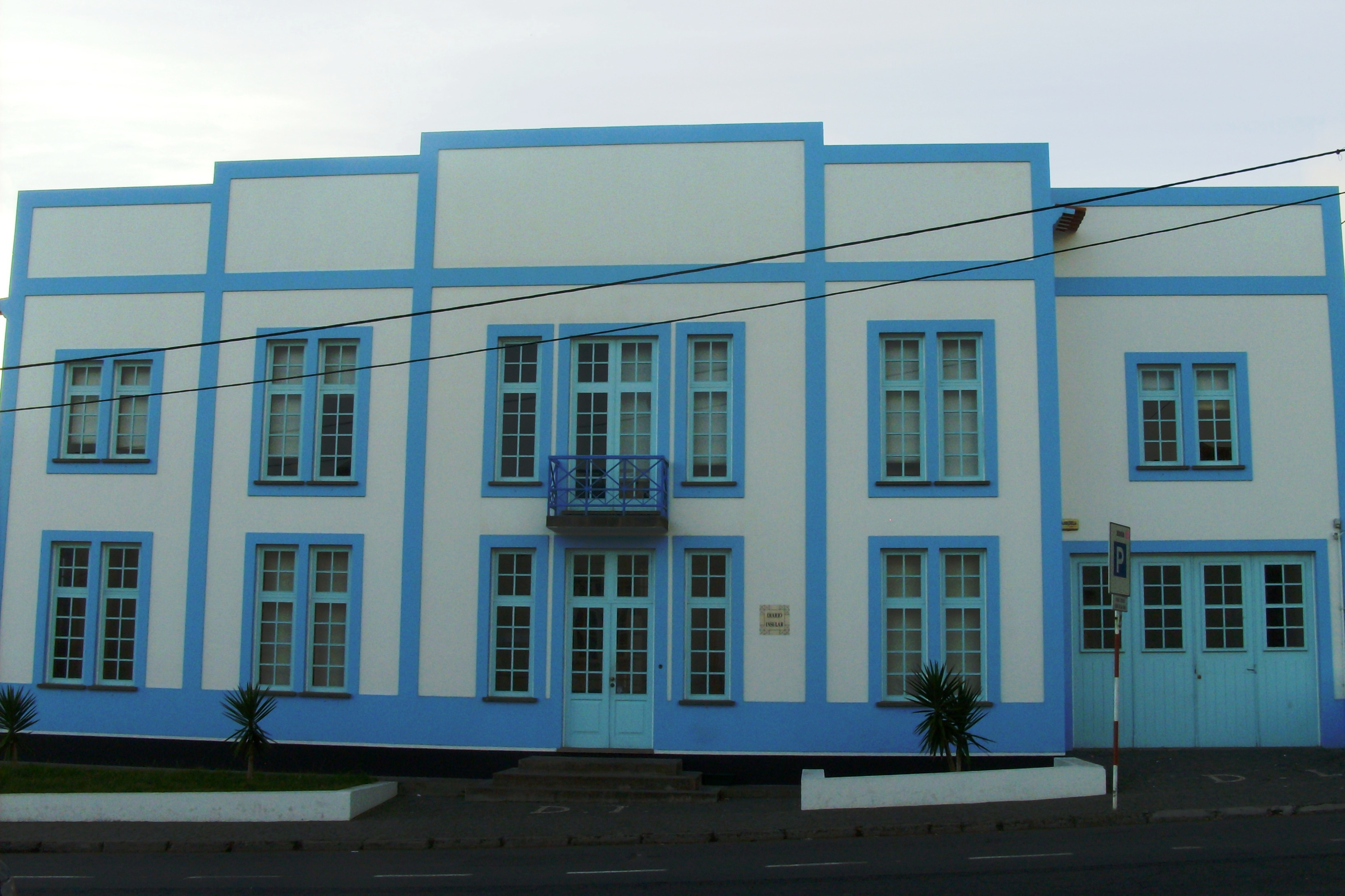
The austere Nationlist-style facade of the Diário Insular in Angra do Heroísmo

Founded in 1946, by Cândido Pamplona Forjaz, who was director from 1962 to 1974, Diário Insular was decidedly-associated with the Estado Novo regime of António Oliveira de Salazar. Yet, during this period, the publication was censured by the Salazar government for commentaries or reports that contradicted the regime.

Diário Insular is owned by Sociedade Terceirense de Publicidade, under daily management of director José Lourenço.
