= Matriz (Horta) =

- Civil parish
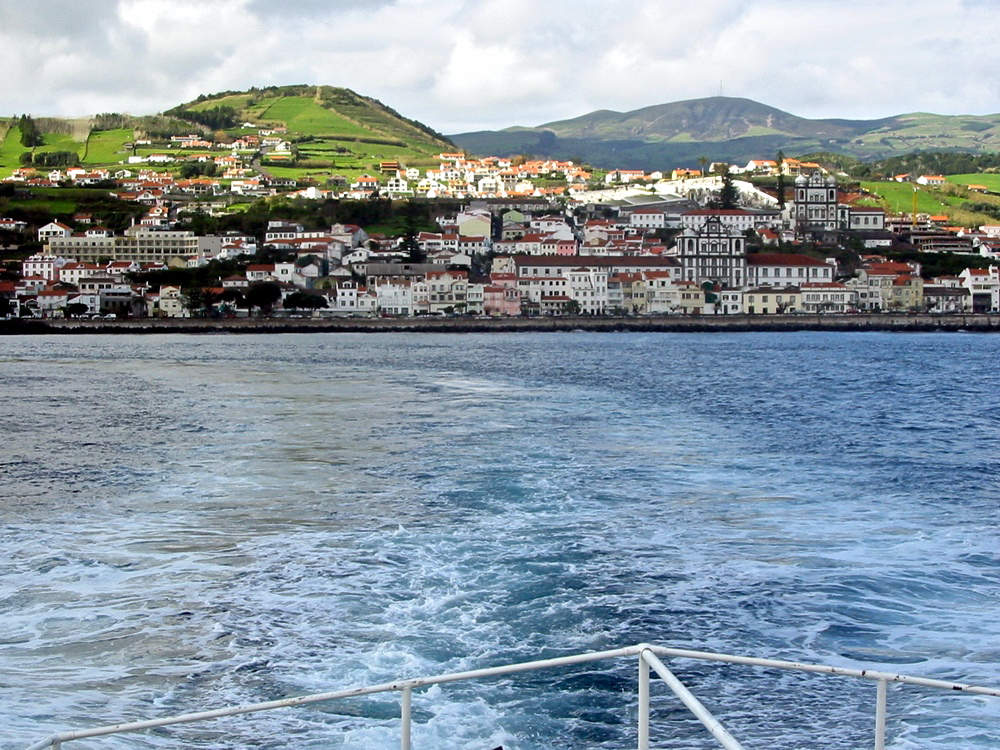
- Matriz, as seen from Horta Bay, showing the old quarter and many of the historical buildings, as well Monte Carneiro

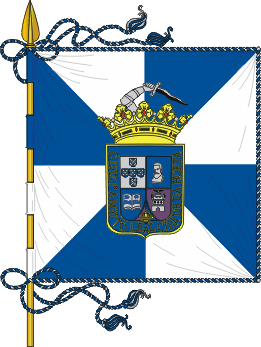
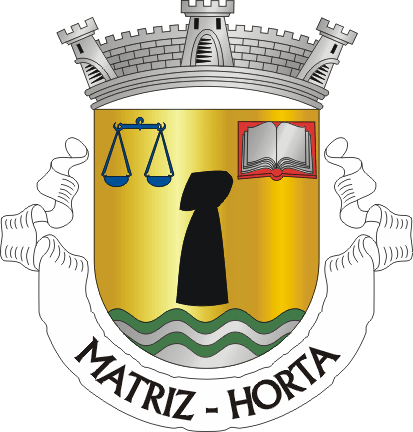
- Flag Coat of arms

- Location of the civil parish of Matriz within the municipality of Horta
- Coordinates: 38°32′19″N 28°37′51″W
- Country: Portugal
- Auton. region: Azores
- Island: Faial
- Municipality: Horta

Area
  - Total: 1.81 km^{2} (0.70 sq mi)
- Elevation: 76 m (249 ft)

Population (2011)
  - Total: 2,562
  - Density: 1,420/km^{2} (3,670/sq mi)
- Time zone: UTC−01:00 (AZOT)
  - Summer (DST): UTC+00:00 (AZOST)
- Postal code: 9900-114
- Area code: 292
- Patron: Santissimo Salvador
- Website: http://freguesiamatriz.pt/

Matriz is a freguesia ("civil parish") in the municipality of Horta, in the Portuguese Azores, which is part of the urbanized core of the city of Horta. The population in 2011 was 2,562, in an area of 1.81 km². It is the smallest and most populous parish on the island. It contains the localities Matriz and Dutras.

== History ==
It was the second Captain-major of Faial, Joss d'Utra, son of the Flemish pioneer Josse van Huerter, that originally settled and developed the area of Matriz. The religious parish, Matriz do Santissimo Salvador, was created from successive growth of the village of Horta in 1498, by the royal decree of King Manuel I of Portugal.

The primitive Church Matriz de São Salvador was completed and inaugurated on June 28, 1514; it complements the Flemish church of the same name in Bruges and the Sé of Angra do Heroísmo. It was successively sacked in 1589, then 1597, by English privateers.

In 1643, Diogo das Chagas identified that the area of the Matriz had about 1,985 inhabitants in 449 homes. It was also a centre of the faith community during the period of exploration; the home to several churches and religious sanctuaries, that include: the Jesuit Church and Convent, the Church of Misericórdia (Mercy), the Convent of São João, the Convent of Nossa Senhora da Glória, the Convento de Santo António, the Império dos Nobres (in homage to the 1672 volcanic eruption) and the old Clock Tower (former tower of another destroyed church).

== Geography ==
Matriz is buttressed between its urban neighbors Angústias (along its southern border), Conceição (along its northern), and the landlocked parish of Flamengos (towards the west)): it fronts Horta Bay, and the island of Pico towards the east. Generally, the parish is a gently sloping tract of land that slopes towards the interior (Flamengos), that is highly urbanized and which constitutes the core the city of Horta.

Most commercial, administrative and residential uses are concentrated in this parish, including the Regional Assembly, many of the historical churches (including Igreja Matriz do SS.º Salvador da Horta), convents and social services, antique farmers market, post office, archive and other public buildings. Landmarks includes the Horta Museum, Sociedade Recreativa Amor da Pátria, Império dos Nobres (Empire of Nobles), Horta's clock tower, the former Walter Bensaúde Hospital (future expansion of the Department of Oceanography and Ichthyology of the University of the Azores, a panoramic view at Monte Carneiro and the Horta Archive and the Public Library (the old Bensaúde House, Port.: Casa Bensaúde).

== Architecture ==
=== Civic ===
- CTT Correios, Telégrafos e Telefones (Portuguese: Edifício dos Correios, Telégrafos e Telefones, CTT, da Horta)
- Faialense Theatre (Portuguese: Teatro Faielense)
- Legislative Assembly of the Azores (Portuguese: Edifício Sede da Assembleia Legislativa Regional dos Açores)
- Society of Amor da Pátria (Portuguese: Edifício da Rua Dom Pedro IV/Sociedade Amor da Pátria)

=== Religious ===
- Convent of the Third Order of Monte Carmel (Portuguese: Convent of Carmo)
- Convent of Nossa Senhora do Carmo (Portuguese: Convento de Nossa Senhora do Carmo)
- Convent of São Francsico (Portuguese: Convento de São Francisco/Igreja de Nossa Senhora do Rosário)
- Jesuit College of São Francisco Xavier/Church of Horta Portuguese: Colégio de São Francisco Xavier/Igreja Paroquial da Horta)
