= Salão =

- Civil parish
- Location of the civil parish of Salão within the municipality of Horta
- Coordinates: 38°37′14″N 28°39′53″W
- Country: Portugal
- Auton. region: Azores
- Island: Faial
- Municipality: Horta
- Established: Settlement: fl.1600 Parish: c.1620 Civil parish: c.1730

Area
  - Total: 10.40 km^{2} (4.02 sq mi)
- Elevation: 107 m (351 ft)

Population (2011)
  - Total: 401
  - Density: 38.6/km^{2} (99.9/sq mi)
- Time zone: UTC−01:00 (AZOT)
  - Summer (DST): UTC+00:00 (AZOST)
- Postal code: 9900-501
- Area code: (+351) 292 XXX-XXXX
- Patron: Nossa Senhora do Socorro

Salão (pronounced [sɐ.ˈlɐ̃w̃]) is a freguesia ("civil parish") in the municipality of Horta on the island of Faial, the Portuguese Azores. The population in 2011 was 401, in an area of 10.40 km².

== History ==
The settlement of Salão can be traced back to 1620, to a Castilian family that moved there from the adjacent community of Santa Bárbara (now the area of Praça in Cedros). The family originally settled there in 1589, but after an acrimonious disagreement between neighbors, the family moved farther south. They constructed a new home in the zone that would be referred to as Carapeta; Carapeta (or Carapeto) is a disused term referring to "one who makes lies or liars".

The nucleus of what would develop into Salão started in Carapeta, around the river-valleys that crossed the area. A local fountain (Portuguese: Fonte da Carapeta) supported the small community (of mostly Spanish settlers) in its infancy, until it was destroyed in the 1926 earthquake. They brought to the island their worship of Nossa Senhora do Perpétuo Socorro (Our Lady of Perpetual Help/Aid); a statue was brought from Spain, specifically. The statue was 80 cm tall, can completely covered in gold leaf. Years later the statue was removed and placed in the hands of a local family from Canto, whom conserved the image for many years.

By 1640, with the dissolution of the Iberian Union, the Spanish were expelled by inhabitants of Cedros. As the story goes, masked and armed residents of Cedros with pitchforks, sickles, knives and hoes, ordered the local residents to collect their clothing and leave the parish. Driving them towards Horta, the Cedrenses accompanied the Spanish as far as Alto da Ribeirinha (in the neighboring parish of Ribeirinha). As they returned from the expulsion, the inhabitants discovered many of the Spanish clothing lying along the route. From there on, the area became known as Espalhafatos which literally means "scattered suits", referring to the ornamented clothing found scattered along the route.

But settlers continued into the area, settling in communities such as Lomba, Barreiro, Cela and Canto: by 1730, Salão became a civil parish. A church, the Church of Nossa Senhora do Socorro (Our Lady of Help/Aid) was constructed in 1780, to replace the older 1727 chapel. It was a simple sanctuary with a single nave and altar, and 24.2 meters (length) by 10.12 meters (wide) dimensions. In 1834, the church received three golden altarpieces from the destroyed Convent of São João (Portuguese: Convento do São João) in Horta, a new pulpit, and extensive remodeling to include two chapels dedicated to Nossa Senhora do Rosário (Our Lady of the Rosary) and Nossa Senhora das Dores (Our Lady of the Stigmata). This church survived until the 9 June 1998 earthquake that destroyed many of the bridges and homes in Salão.

Cela, another neighborhood in Salão, developed because of a nun who settled in the parish after the religious orders were ended in 1834. The nun constructed a simple small home, similar to her accommodations in the convent where she continued her worship until her death; in this context, Cela refers to "cell", or, basically, the simple, stark chambers used by the nun for her living quarters in the convent. The area where she would live became known as Cela, because the local peoples referred to her home as "Casa da Cela" then "the place of Cela".

At its height (1871), the population of Salão was 1,186 inhabitants in 285 homes. Since this period, it has slowly decreased due to emigration to North America. In 1962 there were 210 families, and 750 inhabitants. In 1970, it continued to fall to 585: the neighboring parish (Riberinha) had a greater population.

Canalized water only appeared in the parish as of 28 May 1948, a second fountain was also inaugurated on 26 July 1950.

== Geography ==
Salão (also referred to as Solão historically) derives its name from the term for a mixture of clay, sand and tephra derived from pyroclastic projectiles. The zone of Salão, which occupies the space between the Riberinha Graben and Cedros Plateau is an area of deposits of lapilli particulars, or tephra projectiles smaller than 64 mm. The name Salão refers to the historical local common name for these materials; in current Portuguese taxonomy, Salão, literally means "large hall" or "living room", and the reference to volcanic ejecta is not familiar.

The parish is located on the north coast of Faial, between Riberinha and Cedros, linked to other communities by the Regional Road E.R. 1-1ª, that encircles the island and connects it to the city of Horta. The parish is composed of several "communities" (similar to neighborhoods) that include Canada do Arrabalde, Canada do Barão, Canada da Dona Catarina, Canada do Mestre, Carapeto de Baixo, Carapeto de Cima and Salão.

=== Ecoregions/Protected areas ===
One of the primary areas of environmental protection is the Parque Florestal do Cabouco Velho (Forest Park of Cabouco Velho), located in Alta, in the civil parish. An area of 5 hectares, the park provides areas for picnicking, with grills and washrooms, in an area protected to conserve the endemic plants and fauna. Today, the Parque de Campismo(camping park) adds another layer to local activities and tourist attractions of the island, providing areas to camp, grills and public washrooms for traveling hikers and tourists.

== Economy ==
Historically, Saloenses cultivated small gardens and parcels near their homes. Crops cultivated in these hortas were common and sweet potatoes, beans, peas, local yam and taro, as well as fruit trees (such as oranges, lemons, apples, figs, cherries, tangerines and apricots).

In addition to agriculture, the Saloenses dedicate their resources to the fishery. At one time two whaling boats were docked in porto of Salão, being one of the first whaling ports in the Azores. A whaling company, Companhia Baleeira Saloense, grew due to the ideal whaling waters between the islands of São Jorge and Graciosa. The ending of commercial whaling resulted in the refocusing of the community to subsistence fishing and agriculture, as well as the dairy industry.
