= University of the Azores =

University in Azores, Portugal

- Universidade dos Açores
- Former name: Instituto Universitário dos Açores
- Type: Public
- Established: January 9, 1976
- Rector: Susana da Conceição Miranda Silva Mira Leal
- Vice-Rectors: Suzana Nunes Caldeira; Francisco Martins; Adolfo Fernando da Fonte Fialho; Artur Gil
- Faculty: 302
- Administrative staff: 321
- Students: 3,014
- Undergraduates: 2,218
- Postgraduates: 537
- Doctoral students: 106
- Location: Ponta Delgada, São Miguel, Azores, Portugal; 37°44′45″N 25°39′49″W
- Campus: Multiple campuses: Angra do Heroísmo Horta Ponta Delgada
- Colors: Blue
- Mascot: Açor (goshawk)
- Website: uac.pt

The University of the Azores (Portuguese: Universidade dos Açores), or commonly abbreviated as UAc, is the only public university in the Autonomous Region of the Azores. It was founded on January 9, 1976, two years after the Carnation Revolution that ended several decades of dictatorship in Portugal, but before the Portuguese Third Republic was institutionalized, along with the region's autonomy. The university is a public institution dependent on the Ministry of Science, Technology and Higher Education and was established in order to advance sustainable development and higher education in the Azores.

== History ==
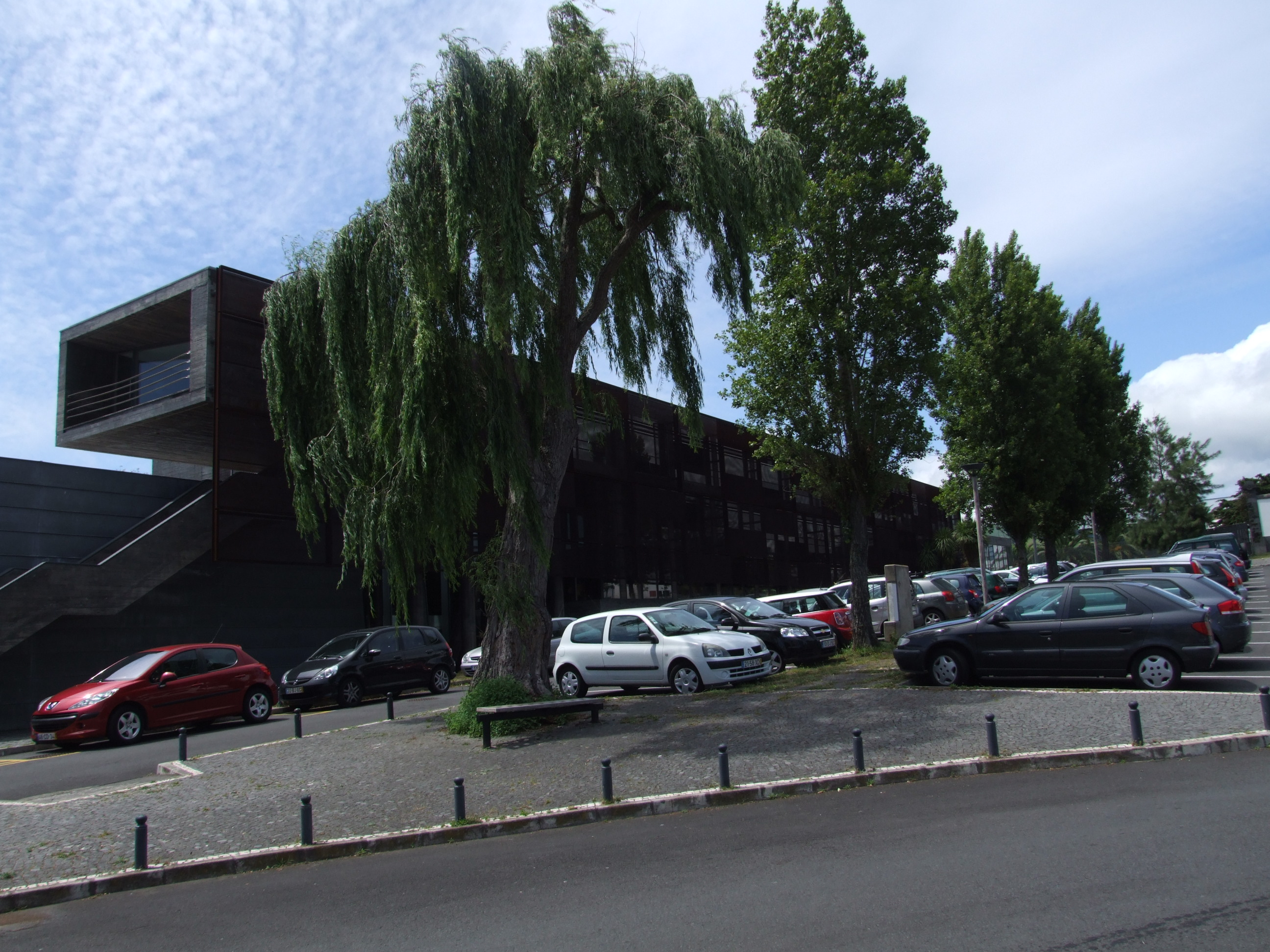
The University Library on the Ponta Delgada Campus

The establishment of the University of the Azores developed from a period of autonomous politics related to separatist movements that developed in the second half of 1975. Although not completely responsible, the events following the Carnation Revolution provided the conditions necessary for the creation of the university. Due to a level of academic disorder on the continent, that forced the closing of many universities, several of the wealthier families sent their children to the United States or Canada in order for them to complete their studies. It was during this post-revolutionary period that the idea of creating a local institution of higher learning was debated. A small group of academics and elites explored alternatives in order to lower costs, distances and reduce the impact of national government centralization. It was at this time that the central government suggested the creation of a Centro Universitário (University Centre), one that the President of the Regional Junta, General Altino de Magalhães, refused to consider since he felt that the community would only accept the establishment of a formal university.

A working group was established by ministry order 414/75 on 14 October 1976 to debate the issues and provide solutions. On 9 January 1976, Decree 5/76 was promulgated to establish the Instituto Universitário dos Açores (University Institution of the Azores), during an atmosphere of regionalization that fostered the establishment of local/regional institutions responsible for teaching, investigation, cultural development and community services. The intent of the Act was to respond to the process of democratization developing during the post-Carnation Revolution period, and allow the development of regional equilibrium between the continent and the regional institutions. On 25 July 1980, with the promulgation of the Decree-Law 252/80 formalizing the establishment of an institute of higher education, the community began to refer to it as the University of the Azores.

== Structure ==
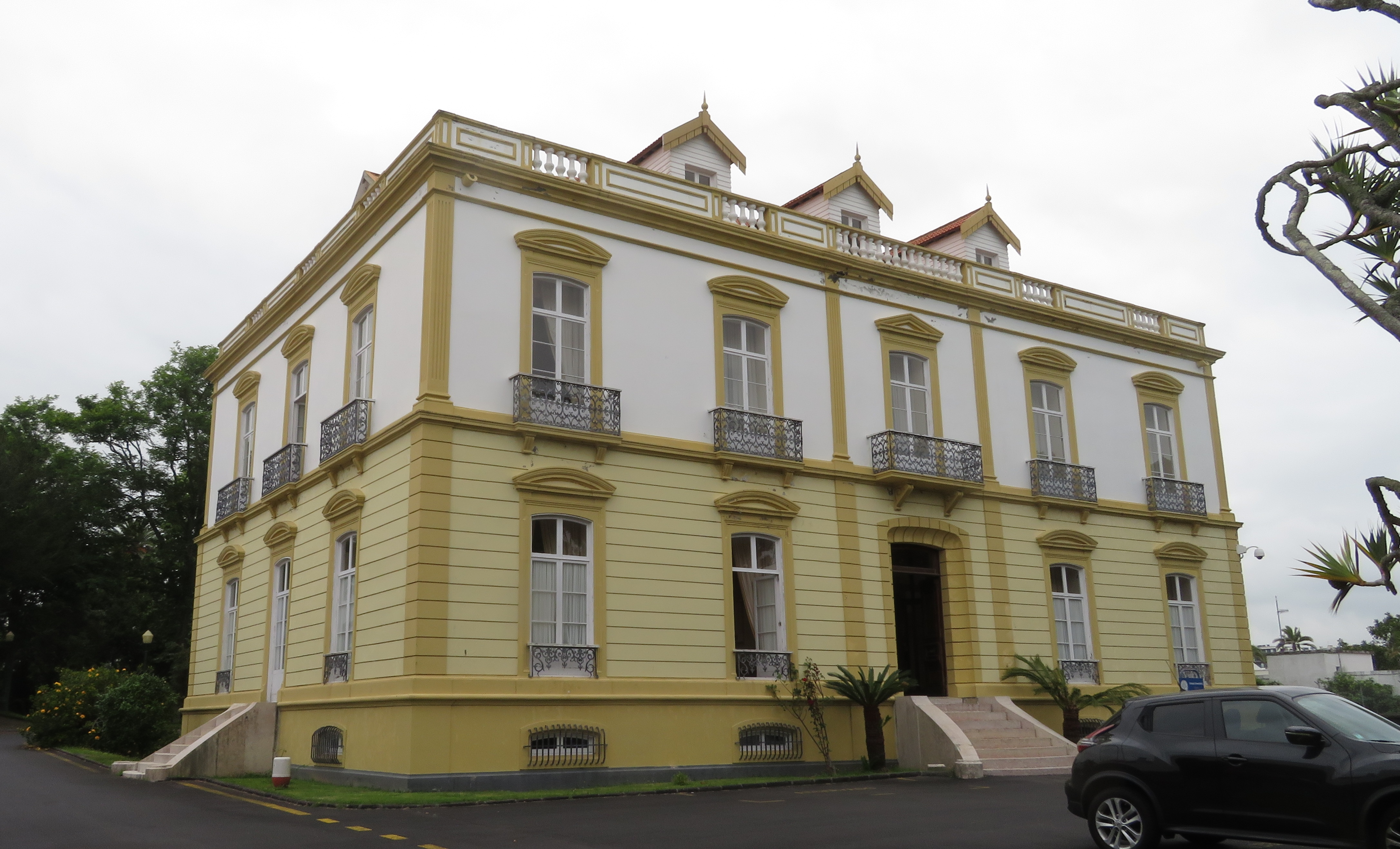
Rectorate, Ponta Delgada campus

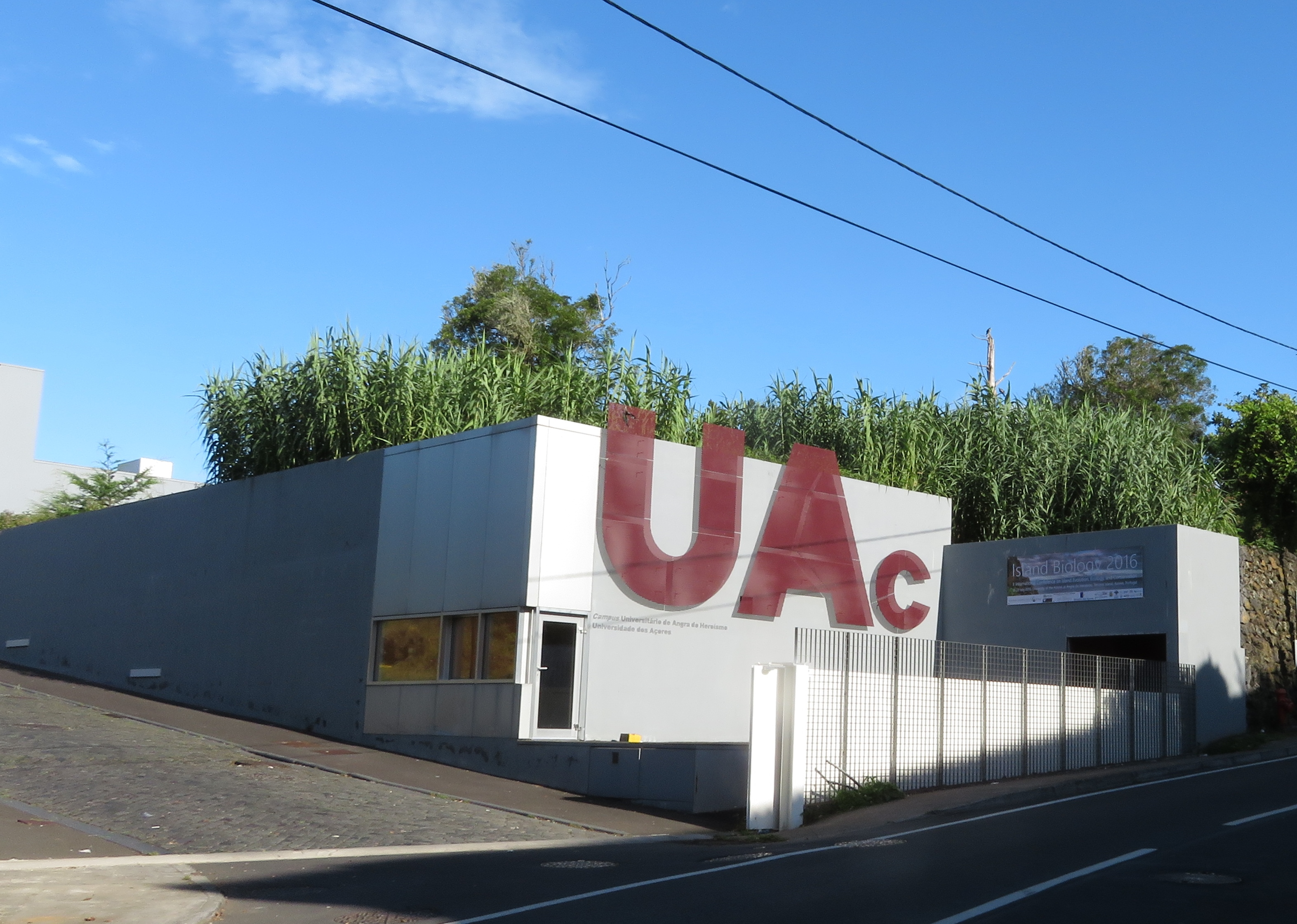
Entrance to the campus, Angra do Heroismo

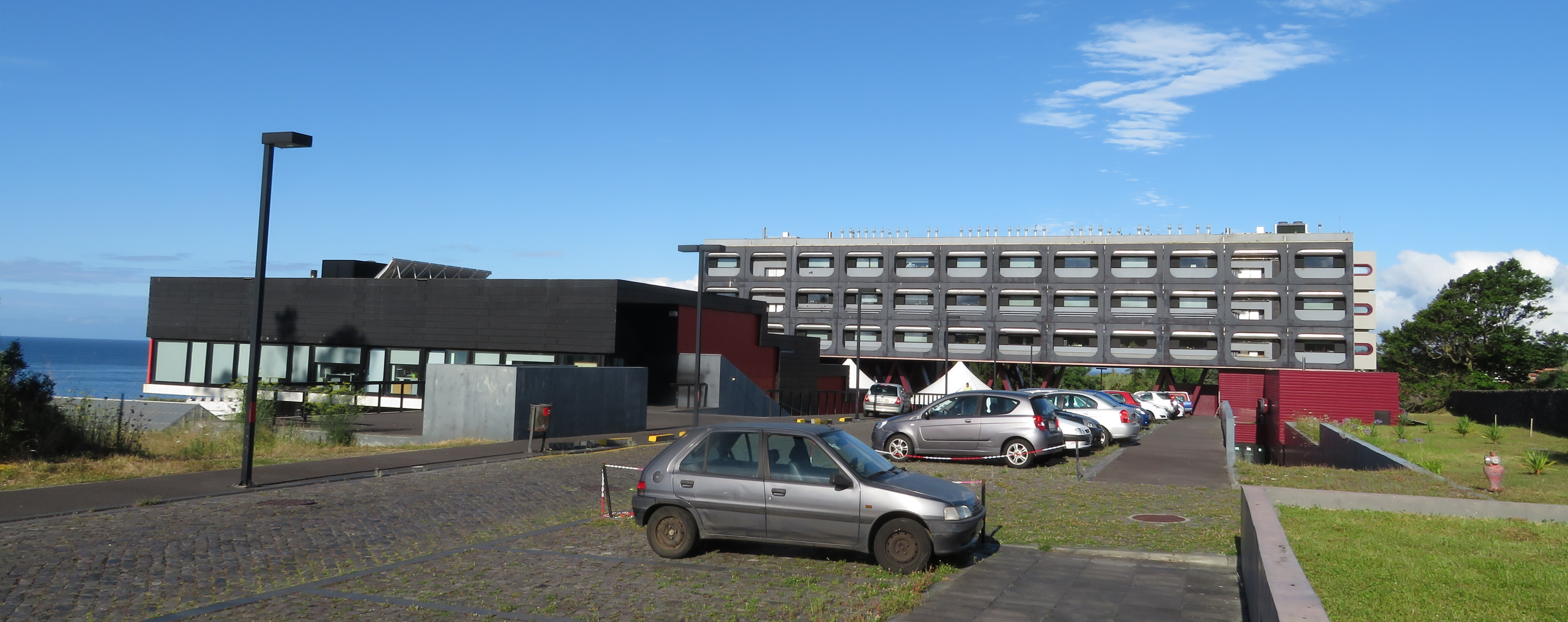
Campus, Angra do Heroismo

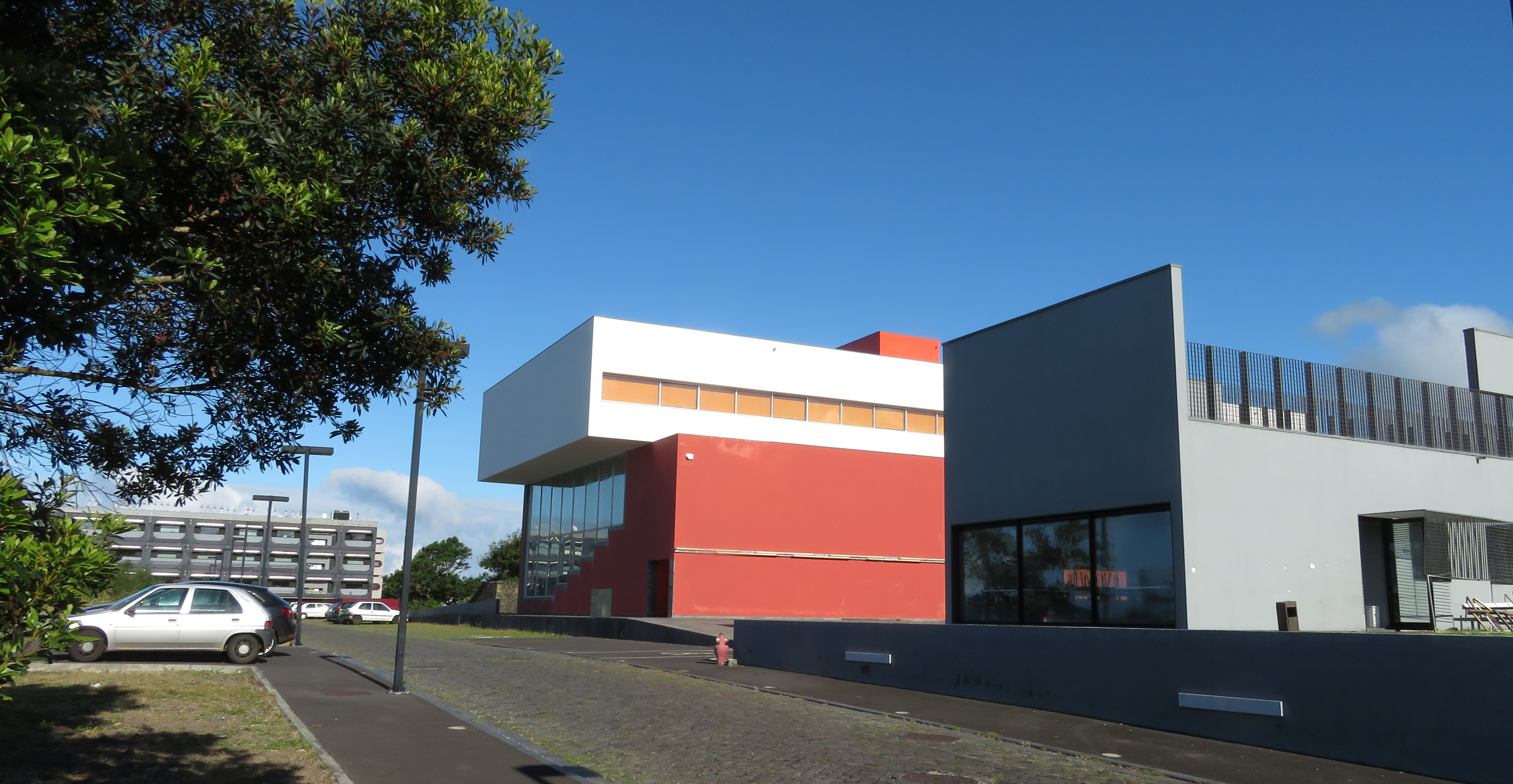
Campus, Angra do Heroismo

In order to effectively provide educational services to the regional population, the university established three campuses, in Ponta Delgada (São Miguel), Angra do Heroísmo (Terceira) and Horta (Faial), and organized into schools, research institutes and centers, to provide instruction and investigation services. In addition to the main campus (Ponta Delgada), which provides a concentration of various disciplines, the other two campuses provide specialized training in agrarian sciences, and Marine sciences, oceanography and fisheries.

Since its foundation, the university has had four rectors. Currently, its rector is Avelino de Freitas de Meneses, a professor of insular history of the Atlantic.

=== Schools ===
- Escola Superior de Saúde, (English: School of Heath), in Angra do Heroísmo and Ponta Delgada
- Escola Superior de Tecnologias e Administração, (English: School of Technologies and Administration), in Ponta Delgada

Faial

- Institute Okeanos e Departamento de Oceanografia e Pescas
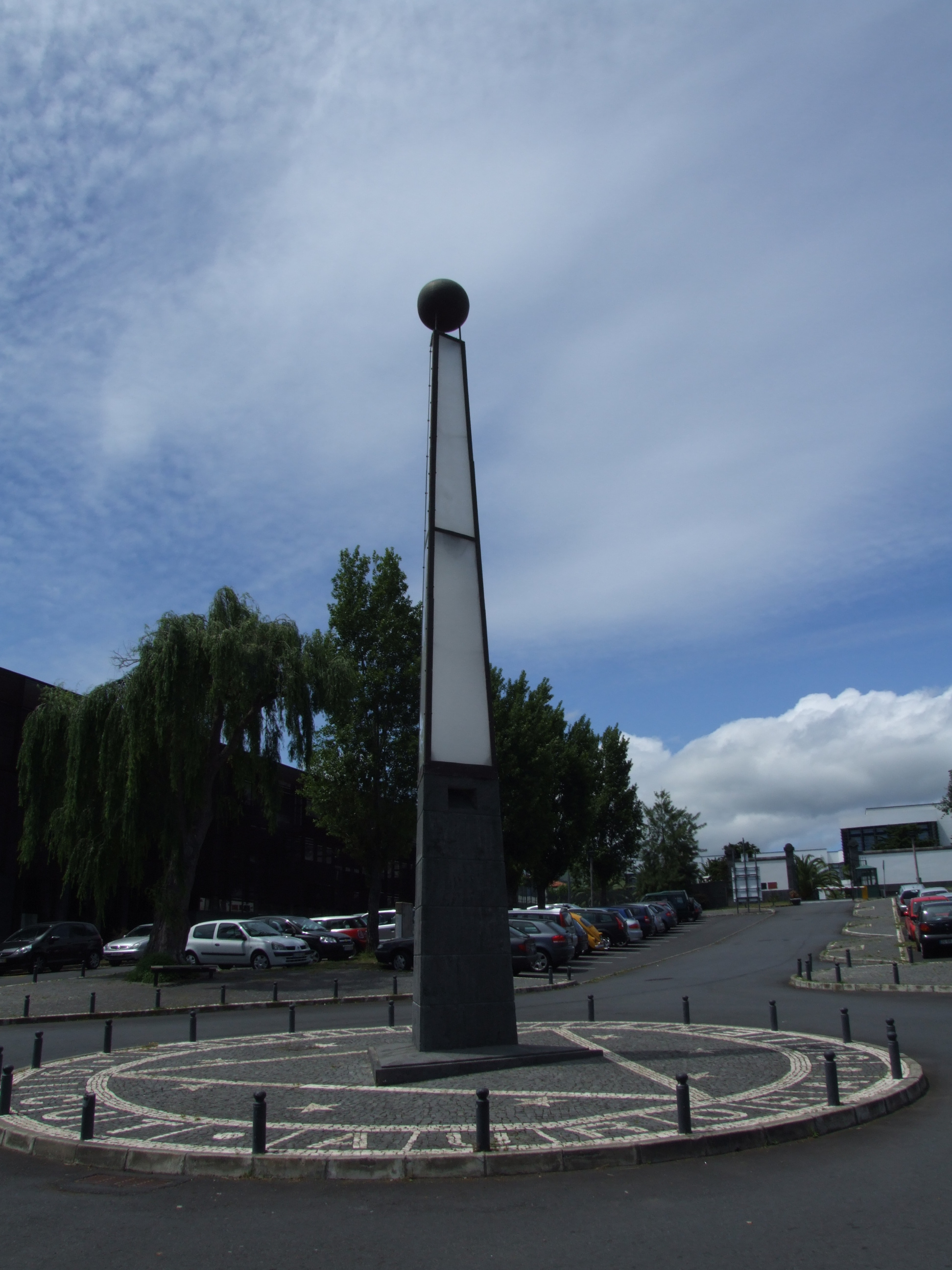
  Central obelisk on the Main Campus in Ponta Delgada, São Miguel
  , (Department of Oceanography and Fisheries) - the only unit located on the island, it was created in 1976, in order to foster "scientific understanding, the conservation of marine life and the sustainable use of the Atlantic Ocean in the region of the Azores". Since 1991, UAc has been a founding member of IMAR (Institute do Mar) and in 1996 joined the network of European Association of Research Stations, EurOcean, the European Network of Excellence on Marine Biodiversity (MarBEF) and European Seas Observatory Network (ESONET). Further, UAç participates in the steering committees for three great initiatives by Census of Marine Life program: ChEss (Biogeography of Chemosynthetic Ecosystems), MAR-ECO (Patterns and Processes of the Ecosystems of the Mid-Atlantic Ridge) and CenSeam (A Global Census of Marine Life on Seamounts). There is also participation on international initiatives as part of the OTN (Ocean Tracking Network).

São Miguel

- Faculdade de Ciências e Tecnologia, (English: School of Science and Technology) - located in Ponta Delgada, São Miguel
- Faculdade de Ciências Sociais e Humanas, (English: School of Social Sciences and Humanities), in Ponta Delgada
- Faculdade de Economia e Gestão, (English: School of Business and Economics), in Ponta Delgada

Terceira

- Faculdade de Ciências Agrárias e do Ambiente, (English: School of Agrarian and Environmental Sciences), in Angra do Heroísmo.

The areas of education and research are:

  - Agriculture: pastures, horticulture, frutaculutre; soils and fertility; protection of plants; hydrology and water resources; rural engineering; regional economies and natural resources;
  - Environment: ecology and conversation; agricultural biology; chemical and physical atmosphere; chemical and water microbiology; climatology; spatial planning; basic sanitation; diagnosis and environmental auditing; environmental impact studies; physical oceanography;
  - Biotechnology
  - Animal Production: nutrition; alimentation; reproduction and maintenance;
  - Food technology: hygiene and food safety; human nutrition; oenology.

== Research centers ==
- Centro de Biotecnologia dos Açores (CBA) (English: The Biotechnology Centre of Azores)
- Centro de Estudos de Economia Aplicada do Atlântico CEEAplA (English: Centre of Applied Economics Studies of the Atlantic)
- Centro de Física e Investigação Tecnológica Dep. de Física da FCT/UNL (English: The Center for Physical and Technological Research )
- Centro de História de Além-Mar (English: The Centre for Overseas History )
- Centro de Inovação e Sustentabilidade em Engenharia e Construção
- Centro de Investigação e Tecnologia Agrária dos Açores (CITA-A)
- Centro de Vulcanologia e Avaliação de Riscos Geológicos
- Centro de Empreendedorismo da Universidade dos Açores|Centro de Empreendedorismo

== Faculty ==
- Maria de Fátima Silva de Sequeira Dias, late historian of the Azores, Department of Management and Economics.

== See also ==
- List of universities in Portugal
- Higher education in Portugal
