= Faial Island =

Portuguese island of the Central Group of the Azores

Native name: Ilha do Faial Nickname: The Blue Island
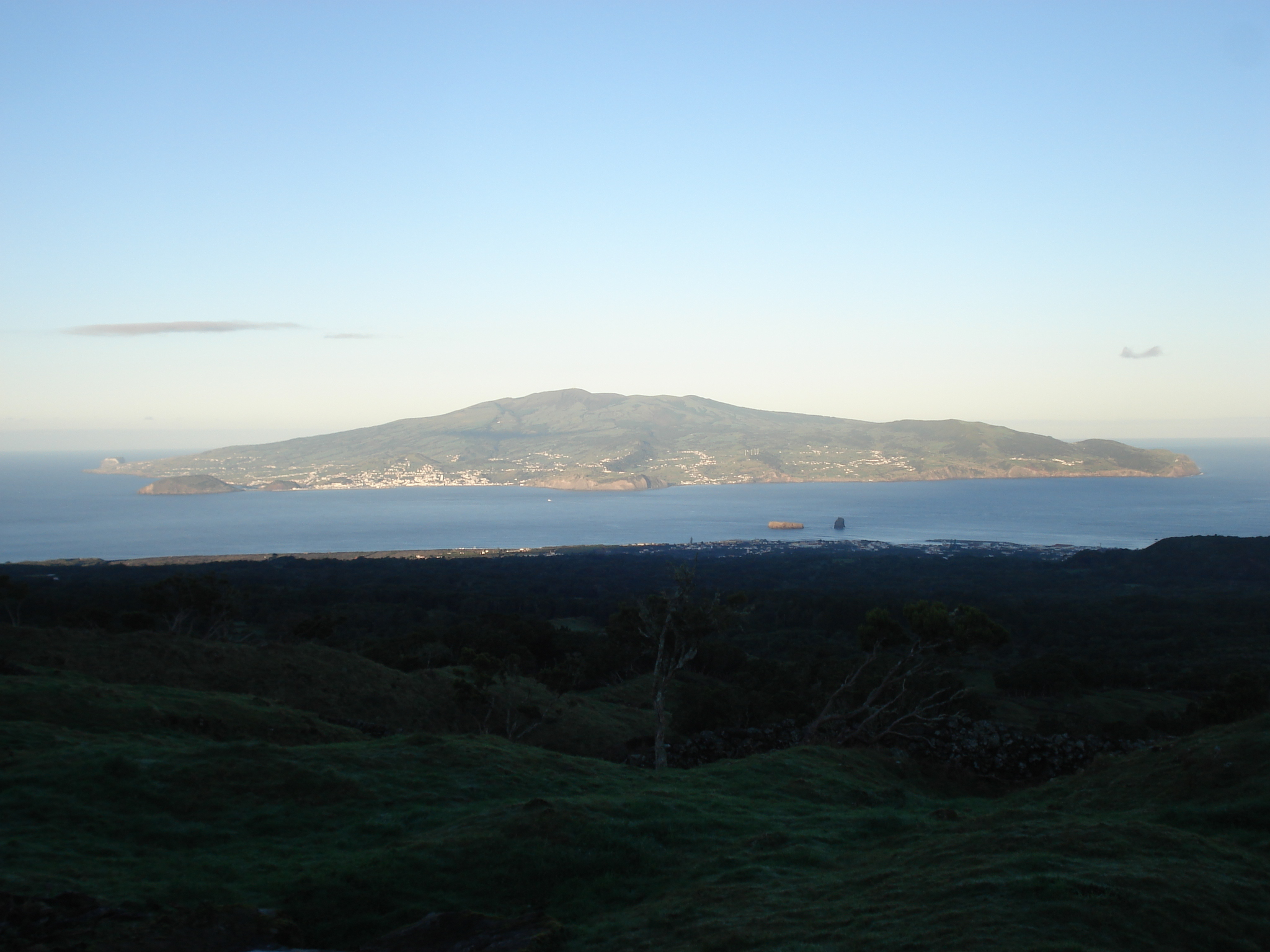
- Faial, as seen from the island of Pico

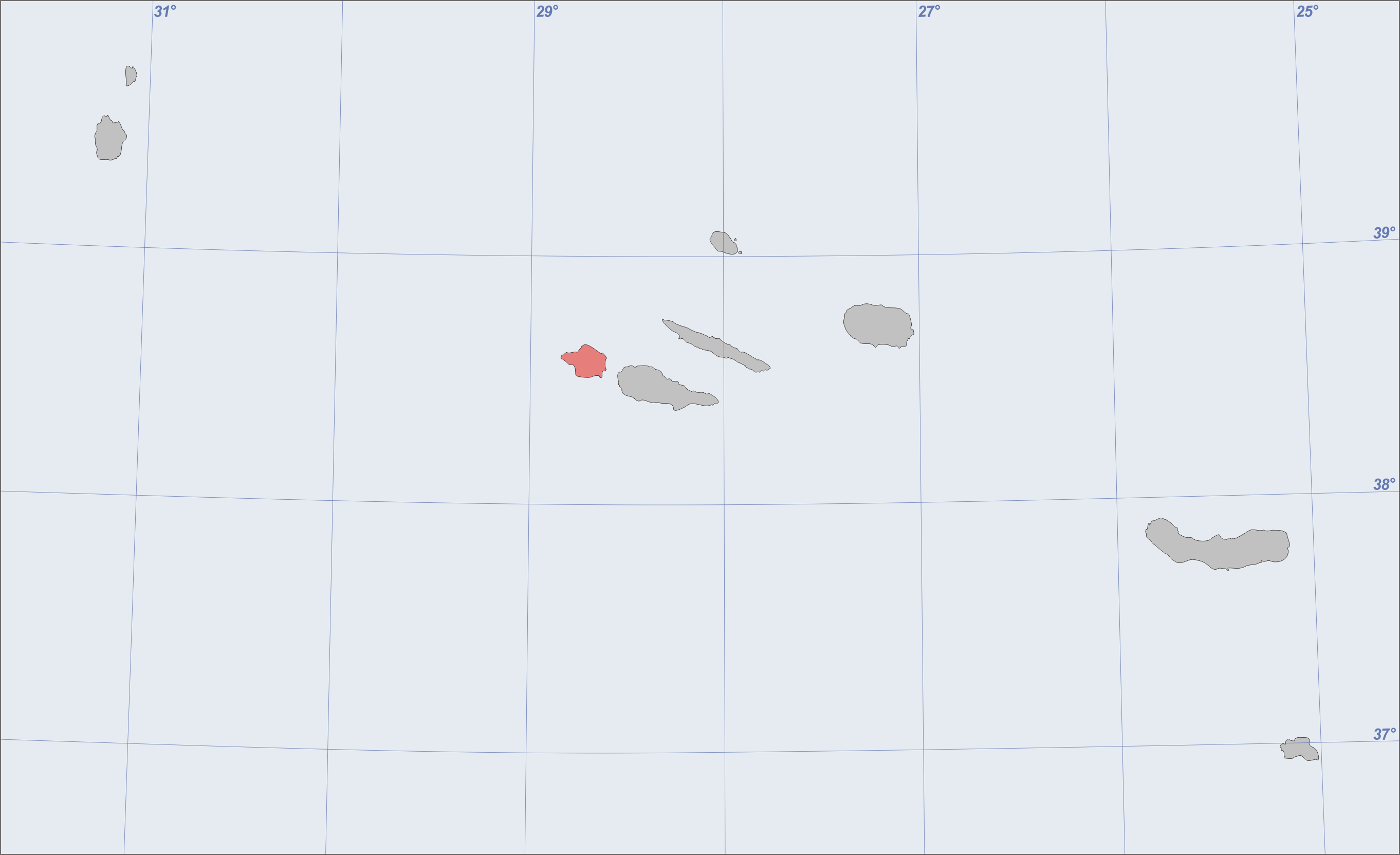
- Location of the island of Faial in the archipelago of the Azores

Geography
- Location: Atlantic Ocean
- Coordinates: 38°34′57″N 28°42′17″W
- Archipelago: Azores
- Area: 173.06 km^{2} (66.82 sq mi)
- Coastline: 80.27 km (49.877 mi)
- Highest elevation: 1,043 m (3422 ft)
- Highest point: Cabeço Gordo

Administration
- Portugal
- Autonomous Region: Azores
- Largest settlement: Horta, Azores (pop. 6,400)

Demographics
- Demonym: Faialense
- Population: ▼14,334 (2021)
- Languages: Portuguese
- Ethnic groups: Portuguese

Additional information
- Time zone: UTC−01:00

Faial Island (pronounced [fɐjˈal]), also known as Fayal Island, is a Portuguese island contained within the Central Group or Grupo Central of the Azores, in the Atlantic Ocean.

The Capelinhos volcano is the westernmost point of the island and can be considered the westernmost point of Europe (from a geophysical perspective) other than the Monchique Islet.

The largest town on the island is Horta with a population of approximately 7,000 inhabitants.

The nearby islands of Pico and São Jorge form an area commonly known as the Triângulo, or Triangle in English.

Faial Island has also been referred to as the Ilha Azul, Blue Island, is a name derived from the writings of Portuguese poet Raul Brandão describing the large and robust number of hydrangeas that bloom during the summer months:

The man [who] had the idea to border the road with these plants should have a statue on the island. In no other place do they prosper better: they need a covering of light, humidity and heat...they are in their place. Their blue is the blue that adorns the Azores on limpid days...this is a blue that is even more blue, the bunches of flowers of a colour more intense and fresh. They are in every direction: rising along the roads and the fields, forming hedges; they serve to divide the plots and to cover the peaceful animals.

— Raul Brandão, As Ilhas Desconhecidas (1926), p. 33.

== History ==
=== Early records ===
During the Middle Ages, (Note: Many stories have been told in the history of Portuguese discovery related to the Azores of the land of Atlantis, Sete Cidades, lands of São Brandão, the Ilhas Afortundadas, Ilha do Brasil, Antília, Ilhas Azuis, Terras do Bacalhaus, and the mysterious island of equestrian statue (attributed to the island of Corvo).) the island of Faial appeared on the 1375 Catalan Atlas as Ilha da Ventura or Insula de La Ventura, meaning Venture Island. By 1427, islands in the middle of the Atlantic had been discovered by Portuguese navigators. During his first voyage of exploration (1451), the navigator Diogo de Teive explored the coast of Faial.

The humanist friar Gaspar Frutuoso recounted that the first explorers did not find an uninhabited island, and that a hermit, who had a small flock and lived in a cave in the interior, had occupied the land. (Note: Later, during the settlement phase, colonists from Terceira were known to leave their herds on the island, returning in the summer while checking their holdings, and regularly communicated with this hermit. He disappeared, according to legend, when he crossed the channel between Faial and Pico (Saudades da Terra, Vol.VI, Cap.37).)

=== Settlement by the Flemish following Josse van Huerter (late 1400s) ===
By 1460, nautical charts referred to this island as Ilha de São Luis. Around this time, Valentim Fernandes da Morávia, a German intellectual and translator residing in Lisbon, gave the first account relating to the settlement of the island. He wrote that Friar Pedro, the queen's confessor, traveled with the Infanta Isabella of Portugal, Duchess of Burgundy, to Flanders, where he met and developed a friendship with the nobleman Josse van Huerter. During their conversations, D. Pedro talked to van Huerter about the islands and their deposits of silver and tin (which he assumed were the Ilhas Cassitérides, or in English, the Islands of Tin). Van Huerter convinced 15 other men of the profitability of a venture in the archipelago.

Around 1465, Huerter disembarked for the first time on Faial along the beach of Praia de Almofariz (now Praia do Almoxarife). The expedition remained in the area of Lomba dos Frades for about a year, until their supplies ran out. His compatriots were angered by the lack of the promised precious metals, and van Huerter quickly escaped to Flanders and the court of the Duchess of Burgundy.

In 1467, Huerter returned to Faial on a new expedition, supported by the Duchess, who "ordered men and women of all conditions, as well as priests to convey their religious orders, in addition to ships loaded with furniture and utensils necessary for the land and construction of houses, and she sent them for two years, with everything they needed for subsistence" (according to a caption made by the German geographer Martin Behaim on the Nuremberg Globe). Valentim Fernandes also noted that Isabella had ordered civil criminals to be deported to the island. Infante D. Fernando, the Duke of Viseu and Master of the Order of Christ, gave Van Huerter the title of Captain-Major (Note: The title is a feudal title used in the Atlantic colonies and Brasil where a governor is not warranted, and where the administration of lands, the provision of courts and system of finances require a political administration. The Captains-major were generally remunerated from 10% of the land rents, as well as having their selection of lands within their administration.) of the island. Immediately, the new colonists faced challenges due to a lack of potable water. They moved their settlement to the adjacent valley (which continues to bear the name of Flamengos, the Portuguese term for Flemish or literally, Flemish people). Van Huerter constructed a small chapel, consecrated in the name of Santa Cruz (Holy Cross). He eventually returned temporarily to Lisbon, where he married Beatriz de Macedo, the governess of the Duke of Viseu. Still an apt negotiator, he returned to Faial promoting the settlement of the colony and his holdings. He convinced a second group of settlers, under the Flemish nobleman Willem van der Haegen (later known as Guilherme da Silveira) to bring his compatriots, their families, and support staff to the island in 1467.

The settlers concentrated in the area of Conceição and Porto Pim, creating the nuclei of the Vila de Orta (later the Vila de Horta), a name transliterated from the surname of Josse van Huerter. By 1490, this Flemish community numbered approximately 1,500 people and was joined by several families from the Alentejo, Moinho and other islands in the archipelago. The rapid growth of the island, in this phase, was the result of the cultivation of wheat, and the growth in the woad industry. It was some time later, when the island's name changed to "Fayal", due to a large number of Faya trees (Myrica faya). With the island's improving economy, more Portuguese settled and rapidly the Flemish influence diminished.

=== Iberian settlers face privateers (late 1500s) ===
In 1583, as part of Spain's conquest of the Azores (which began with a landing party on Terceira), a Spanish fleet was sent to Faial. During the expeditionary assault, a body of armed men landed at Pasteleiro and engaged the defenders. Although reinforced by French troops, the garrison was unable to fend off the invaders. During the Iberian Union of Portugal and Spain, the island was frequently attacked by English and French ships. English raiding parties led by George Clifford, 3rd Earl of Cumberland and Robert Devereux, 2nd Earl of Essex attacked the island several times between 1589 and 1597.

Battle of Faial Island
- Part of the Anglo-Spanish War (1585–1604)
Date	22–23 June 1594
Location	Offshore of Faial Island, Azores
Result	English victory

Belligerents
Kingdom of England	Kingdom of Portugal (under the Iberian Union)

Commanders and leaders
George Clifford, 3rd Earl of Cumberland	Francisco de Melo (probable)

Strength
Several English privateer ships	1 Portuguese carrack (Cinco Chagas)

Casualties and losses
Unknown	Total loss of ship and crew

The attacks were partly due to the influx of Spaniards to the islands, as opportunities for Iberian businessmen improved. The raiders, not differentiating between Portuguese and Spanish people or properties, targeted both indiscriminately. To protect themselves, the Faialense built a large number of fortresses; in the 18th century, there were more than 20. Meanwhile, offshore from Faial, on 22/23 June 1594, in what became known as the Battle of Faial Island or the action of Faial, three ships of the Earl of Cumberland attacked the 2,000-ton Portuguese carrack Cinco Chagas, which historians believe to be the richest treasure ship ever to sail from the East Indies, firing and sinking the ship immediately off the island with all hands and all cargo lost. The Cabeço do Fogo Volcano erupted in 1672, leading to substantial emigration to Brazil.

=== Development of Horta as a transatlantic waypoint (1700s - mid 1900s) ===
In intervening years, Horta became a stopover for Jesuit missionaries travelling to and from Brazil and Asia. The Jesuits constructed a college in Horta, as did the Carmelites and Franciscan Orders. In the 18th century, the explorer James Cook also reached the islands before initiating his Pacific voyages of discovery.

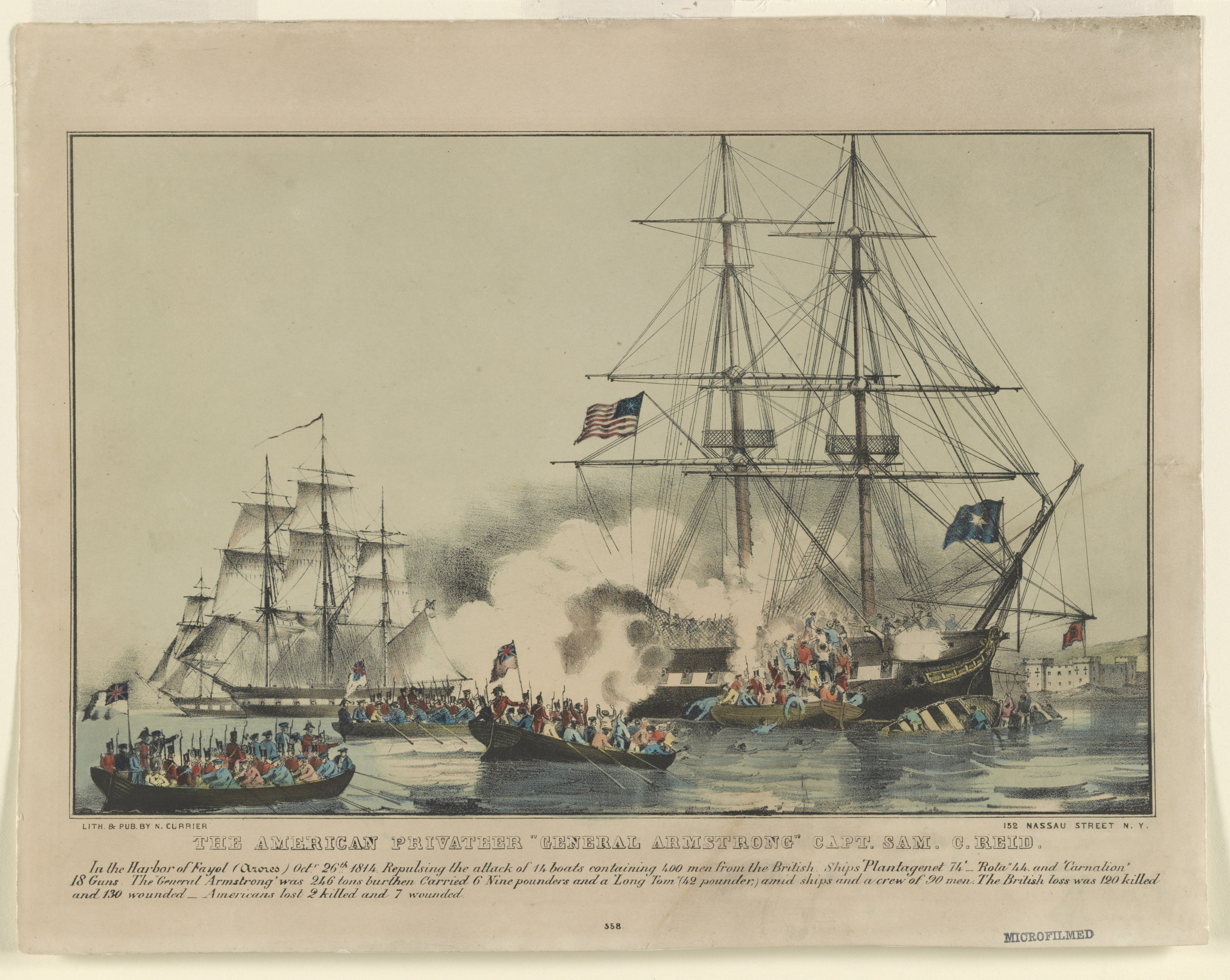
During the War of 1812, British ships Plantagenet, Rota, and Carnation attacked the American privateer General Armstrong on 26 September 1814 in the Fayal harbour.

The people of Faial were active participants in the struggles between the Liberals and Absolutists, finally deciding to favor the Liberals, and welcoming the visit of King Pedro IV in 1832. For its loyalty, Horta was elevated to the status of a town.

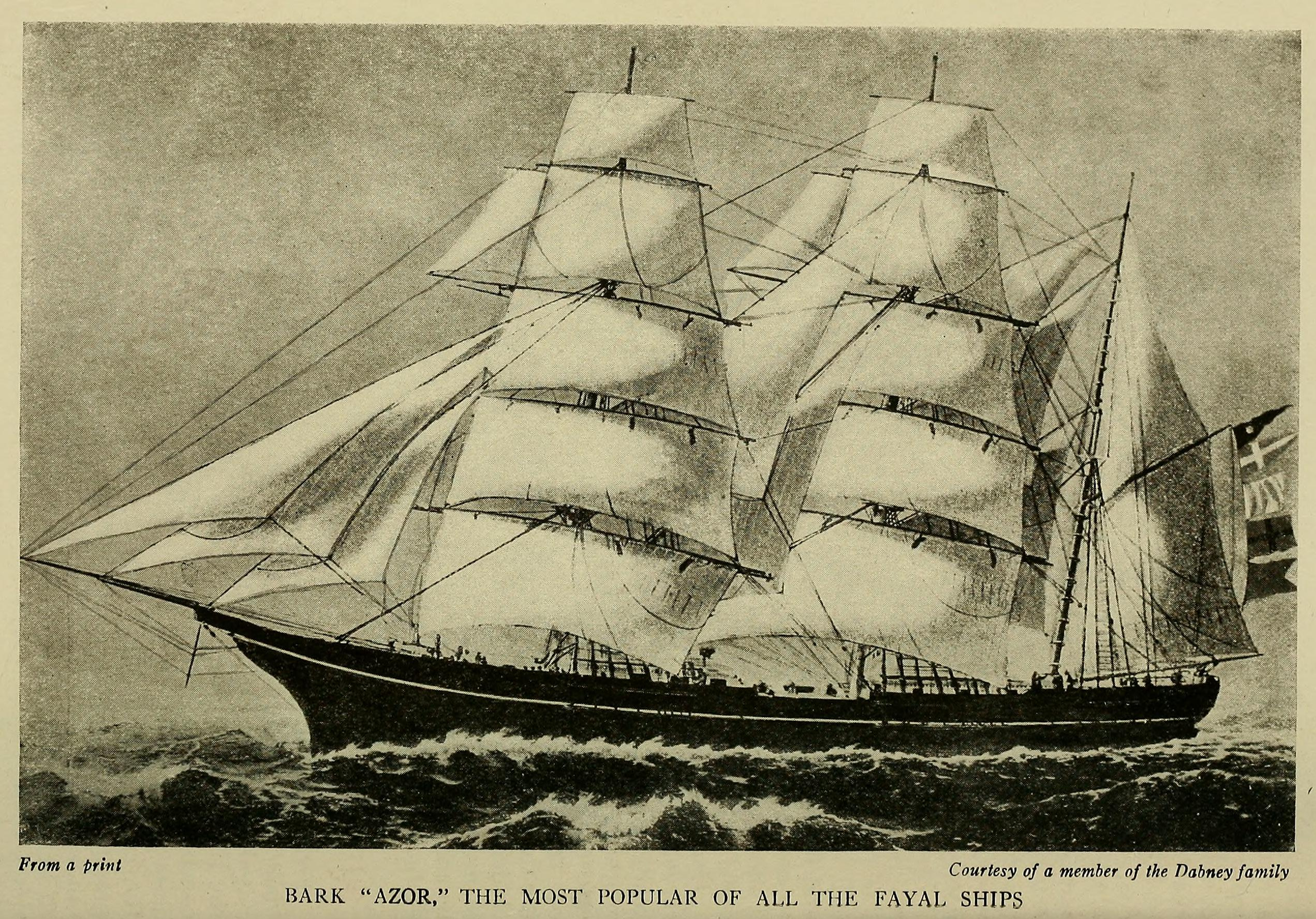
The bark Azor, the most popular of all the Fayal ships.

In 1876, work started on the construction of a dock in the protected harbor of Horta. As time progressed, Faial's importance expanded through this dock, as a waypoint to trans-Atlantic traffic. Charles William Dabney, the American entrepreneur (1794–1871), was responsible for the growth of the industry of the islands, with whaling, wine, and orange exports predominating.

A philanthropic figure, Dabney was responsible for cultivating the economy of the island and supporting its population, aiding agriculture, and generating markets abroad for their goods. As well as owning the Fayal shipping line, he was US consul for the Azores 1826–1871; one of the three Dabneys who for many years held the post of American consul for the Azores. The growth of industry and trans-Atlantic sail traffic also expanded Horta's importance, as a safe harbor and coal storage base. In 1919, the first airplane to cross the Atlantic stopped at Horta. Horta's exceptional situation also led to Pan American establishing a Clipper base there.

Similarly, British, American, French, German, and Italian intercontinental submarine cable stations were based in Horta. During World War Two, Horta was also an important naval base, giving shelter to some of the Allied ships that took part in the Normandy invasion. Historical and local accounts indicate that Horta housed British, German, and American telegraph staff working nearby or in close proximity to each other. According to local Hortense residents, the British and German telecommunications officers often socialized together, playing tennis, attending celebrations, and participating in lively gatherings.

The British Europe & Azores Telegraph Company, the German Deutsch-Atlantische Telegraphengesellschaft (DAT), and the American Commercial Cable Company all operated in Horta, with their offices housed in the same building known as Trinity House. The German community in Horta had an active social, cultural, and sports calendar, hosting regular gatherings and parties at their homes, including receptions for visiting compatriots. These events often took place in the gardens of the German Colony, a residential neighbourhood built to house DAT technicians. The colony featured leisure and sports facilities, such as a tennis court and lawn, which were likely venues for social interaction among the international telegraph operators.

=== Migration to the United States (1950s - 1970s) ===
The island, dependent on whaling and agriculture, remained prosperous until the eruption of the Capelinhos volcano in 1957. Communities of the northern and western coasts were harshly affected by the eruption, as agricultural lands were untillable and covered with sand and ash. This led to the migration of 4,000 people to the United States, spearheaded by members of the Portuguese diaspora in New England and Massachusetts. In addition, whaling, as a viable commercial enterprise, was slowly curtailed with innovations in the chemical sector and the influence of animal-rights groups.

=== Migration to Canada (1950s - 1990s) ===
The 1957 eruption of the Capelinhos volcano on Faial Island devastated local communities, rendering agricultural lands unusable and prompting an emigration movement. While many affected individuals relocated to the United States under the Azorean Refugee Act, a substantial number also migrated to Canada, seeking new opportunities and stability. Canada's post-war economic expansion created a demand for labour in sectors such as agriculture, construction, and manufacturing.

To address this need, the Canadian government, in collaboration with Portugal, initiated labour recruitment programs targeting Portuguese workers. In 1953, the first significant group of Portuguese immigrants arrived in Canada, marking the beginning of a notable wave of migration. Between the 1950s and 1970s, approximately 140,000 Portuguese immigrants settled in Canada, with a significant proportion originating from the Azores, including the island of Faial

=== Autonomous Region of Portugal (1980s - 2000s) ===
Economic and political changes since the 1980s have helped to revitalize the island's economy and development. After the Azores gained the status of an Autonomous Region within Portugal, Horta, the island's only city, hosted the Regional Parliament (Parlamento Regional) of the Azores.

== Geography ==
=== Physical geography ===
Radar image of Faial Island

Along with other islands in the Azores archipelago, the island of Faial is volcanic, being one of the most volcanically active islands of the archipelago, and is close to the tectonic rift between the European and North American Plates. The island can be considered (from a geophysical perspective) the westernmost point of Europe (the two islands west of Faial, Flores and Corvo are already on the American plate).

The island is shaped as an irregular pentagon that occupies an area of approximately 173 square kilometres (67 mi^{2}), formed along a leaky transform fault extending from the mid-Atlantic Ridge to the Hirondelle faults. This is the same fault that bisects the remainder of the Central Group of islands along a west-northwest to east-southeast orientation. Although formed by complex volcanological events, the current landmass is dominated by the crater of its central stratovolcano with relatively gently sloping flanks, showing little sign of major erosion.

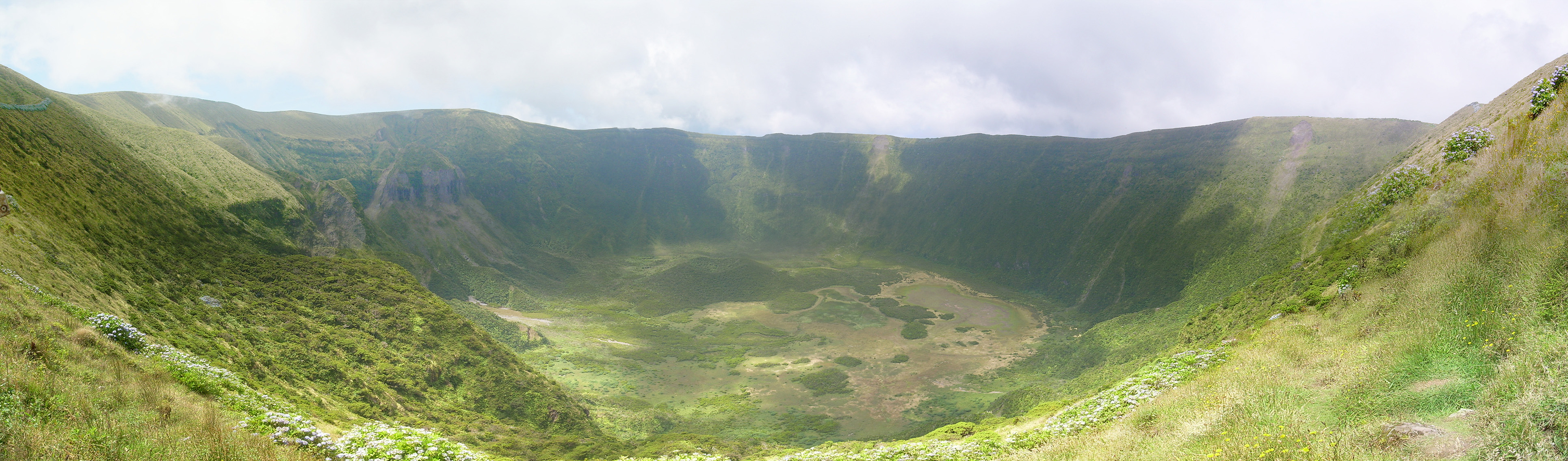
The view of the central Caldeira as seen from the southern rim of the Caldeira Volcano

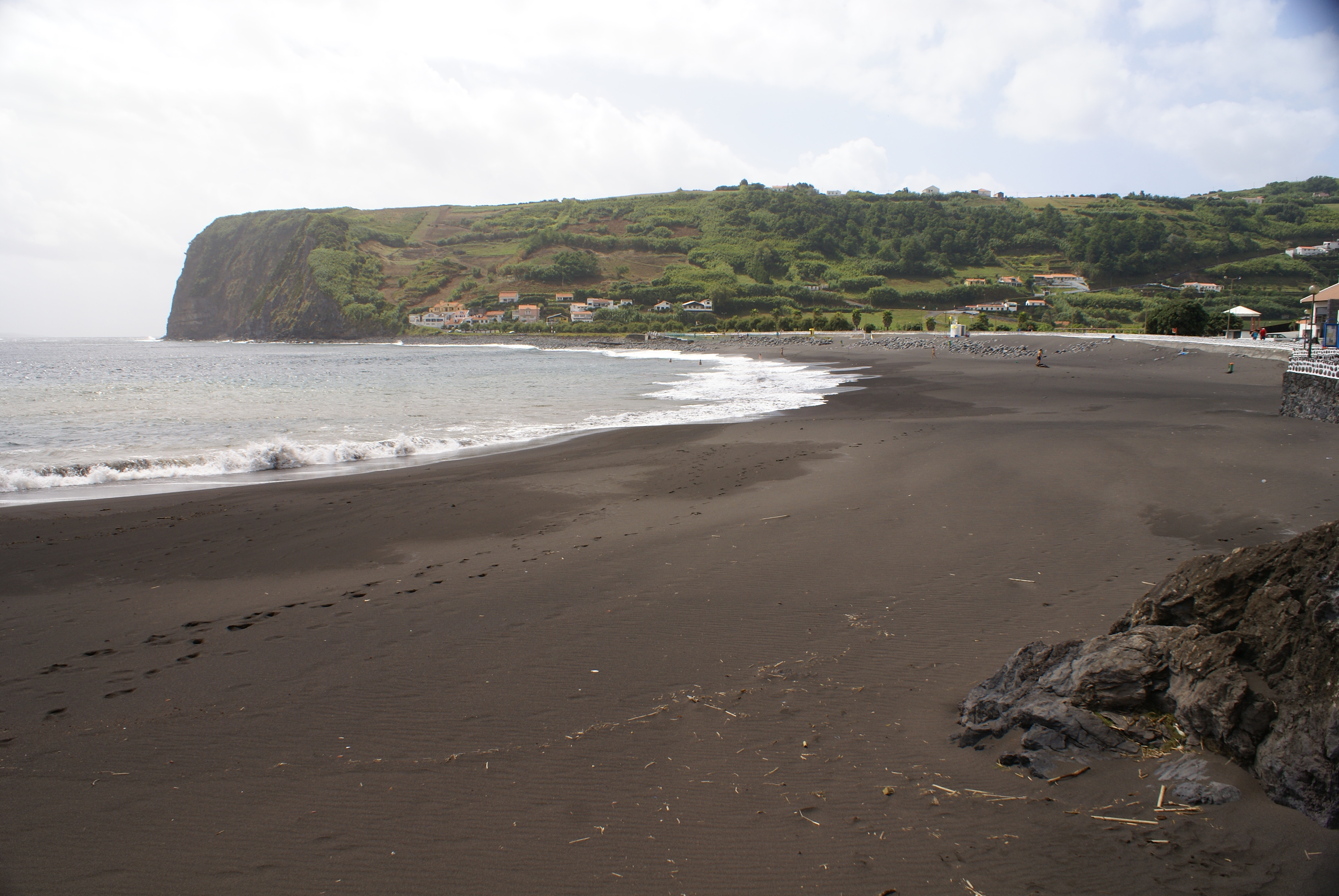
Almoxarife Beach, a black volcanic sand beach in Praia do Almoxarife.

The island was formed from several geomorphological structures resulting from volcanism and other tectonic forces:

- The nature of the stratovolcano structure results in an island that converges at the central Caldera Volcanic Complex, although the highest point occurs along the southern rim, at the peak of Cabeço Gordo (1,043-meter above sea level). The Caldeira (Caldera) is an almost circular 2000-meter perimeter, with a 400-meter depth below the summit of Cabeço Gordo (almost 570 m above sea level). Its center is broken by water marshes, thickets, and minor cinder cones, and surrounded by almost vertical cliffs with diverse vegetation, both endemic or invasive to Macaronesia. It is composed of pyroclastic material, pumitic projectiles, phreatic and phreatomagmatic deposits, and examples of pyroclastic flows and lahars.
- The Pedro Miguel Graben, located in the island's northeast, is characterized by an extensive fault system, showing the remnants of the original Ribeirinha Central Volcano that formed the island. In the southeast, the Horta Platform is characterized by low-altitude projectiles and extensive lava flows. Several strombolian and surtseyan cones, such as Monte da Guia, cover the area occupied by the island's main urban center.
- The Capelo Volcanic Complex is the most recent geomorphological feature, composed of a linear series of scoria cones, resulting from basaltic volcanism of low explosivity. On September 27, 1957, the last eruption took place along Costa da Nau and Ponta dos Capelinhos, near the small parish of Capelo. At first, a small "Ilha Nova" (new island) formed off the coast, quickly disappearing. During a subsequent eruption a cone and a small isthmus formed off the coast, and then volcanic activity dissipated. The volcano became active again on December 16, 1957; this lasted until May 12, 1958, and connected the islet with Faial, effectively enlarging the island by 2.4-km^{2} and extending the Ponta dos Capelinhos into the western ocean.

The mineral fayalite is named for this island, having been first identified and described there in 1840. It is an iron-rich expression within the olivine family.

=== Climate ===
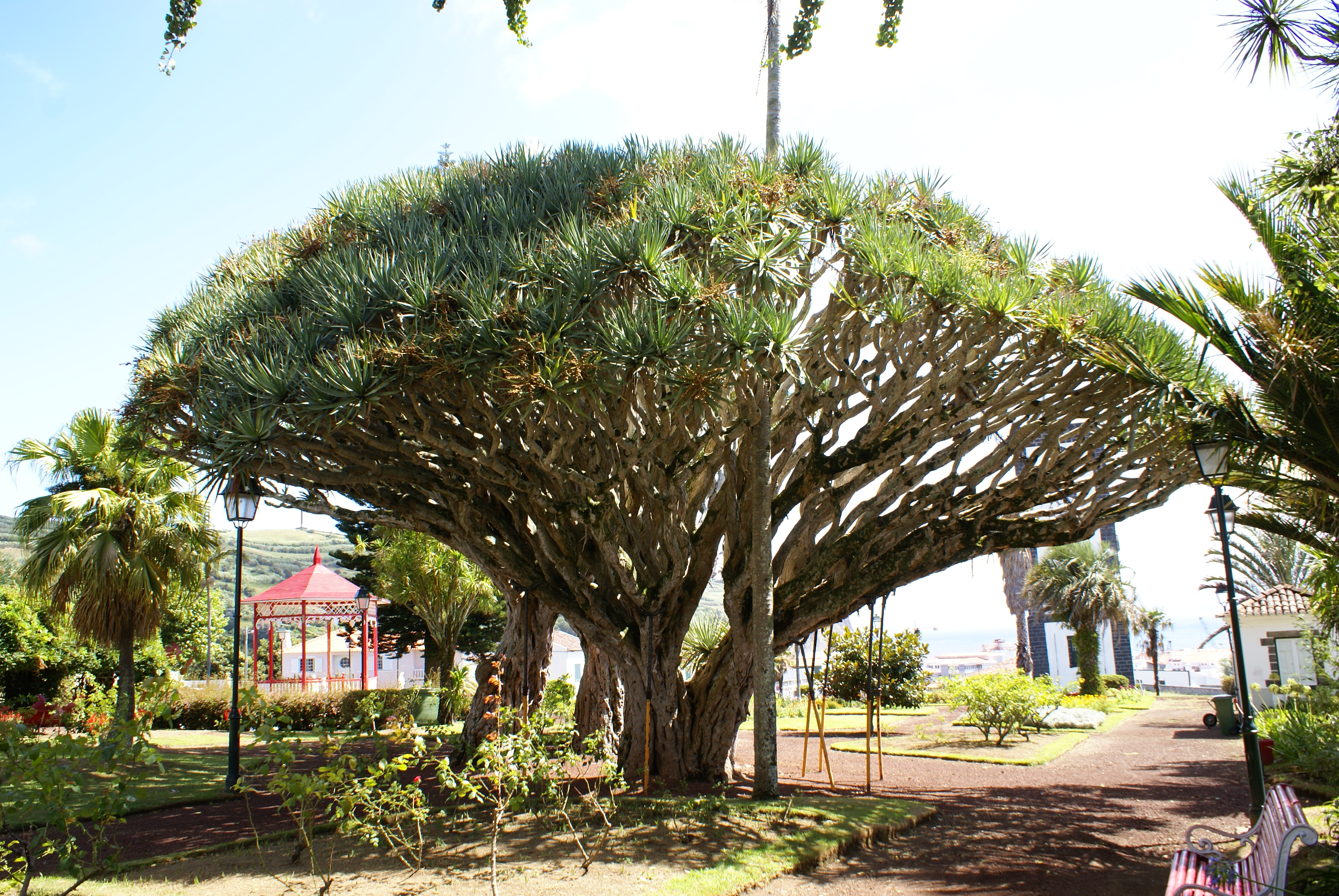
Florêncio Terra Garden

Faial has a humid subtropical climate with some Mediterranean influences, oceanic at higher altitudes. Average temperature is around 17–18 °C (63–64 °F), 20 °C (68 °F) at daytime and 15 °C (59 °F) at nighttime. It has very mild winters for its latitude, in part due to its location in the mid-Atlantic Ocean and influence from the Gulf Stream, averaging 14 °C (57 °F) in its coldest month, February, and frosts never occur other than at high altitude. For comparison, Ocean City, Maryland, at a similar latitude, is 11.4 °C (52.5 °F) colder in its coldest month, averaging only 2.6 °C (36.7 °F). Summers are warm and relatively dry. Temperatures are moderated year-round, never too hot or too cold, daily temperatures are also moderated, with only 5 °C (41 °F) difference between highs and lows.

Average relative humidity remains high at around 80% and insolation is relatively low with around 1800–1900 hours of annual sunshine, similar to locations in coastal northwestern Europe such as Nantes, France, although the sun is stronger in Faial because of its lower latitude. Precipitation is plentiful especially in the winter months, averaging 1,000 mm (39 in) annually. At higher altitudes (e.g. Caldeira Volcano) temperatures are cooler, precipitation and humidity are increasingly higher, and fog is very common.

Climate data for Horta Observatory (Monte da Guia), elevation: 62 m or 203 ft, 1971-1994 normals, 1961-1990 extremes
Month	Jan	Feb	Mar	Apr	May	Jun	Jul	Aug	Sep	Oct	Nov	Dec	Year
Record high °C (°F)	20.4 (68.7)	21.2 (70.2)	21.0 (69.8)	21.7 (71.1)	24.0 (75.2)	26.9 (80.4)	28.9 (84.0)	30.1 (86.2)	30.4 (86.7)	26.2 (79.2)	24.0 (75.2)	21.5 (70.7)	30.4 (86.7)
Mean daily maximum °C (°F)	16.4 (61.5)	16.0 (60.8)	16.5 (61.7)	17.3 (63.1)	19.0 (66.2)	21.4 (70.5)	24.3 (75.7)	25.5 (77.9)	24.2 (75.6)	21.4 (70.5)	19.0 (66.2)	17.3 (63.1)	19.9 (67.7)
Daily mean °C (°F)	14.3 (57.7)	13.7 (56.7)	14.2 (57.6)	14.9 (58.8)	16.5 (61.7)	18.8 (65.8)	21.4 (70.5)	22.4 (72.3)	21.5 (70.7)	18.9 (66.0)	16.9 (62.4)	15.2 (59.4)	17.4 (63.3)
Mean daily minimum °C (°F)	12.1 (53.8)	11.4 (52.5)	12.0 (53.6)	12.5 (54.5)	13.9 (57.0)	16.2 (61.2)	18.5 (65.3)	19.4 (66.9)	18.7 (65.7)	16.5 (61.7)	14.7 (58.5)	13.1 (55.6)	14.9 (58.9)
Record low °C (°F)	4.3 (39.7)	4.6 (40.3)	4.9 (40.8)	4.8 (40.6)	8.6 (47.5)	11.8 (53.2)	13.9 (57.0)	14.3 (57.7)	12.5 (54.5)	10.4 (50.7)	7.6 (45.7)	5.6 (42.1)	4.3 (39.7)
Average rainfall mm (inches)	90.0 (3.54)	94.0 (3.70)	74.9 (2.95)	63.4 (2.50)	58.7 (2.31)	47.2 (1.86)	33.5 (1.32)	54.5 (2.15)	95.6 (3.76)	115.3 (4.54)	123.8 (4.87)	111.1 (4.37)	962 (37.87)
Average relative humidity (%)	80	80	80	79	81	81	80	80	80	79	80	81	80
Mean monthly sunshine hours	91.4	95.4	120.1	154.6	181.6	174.1	231.8	237.8	178.3	144.5	102.8	82.8	1,795.2
Source: IPMA, NOAA (humidity)

Climate data for Horta Airport, Castelo Branco, elevation: 45 m (148 ft), 1972-1990
Month	Jan	Feb	Mar	Apr	May	Jun	Jul	Aug	Sep	Oct	Nov	Dec	Year
Record high °C (°F)	19.7 (67.5)	20.2 (68.4)	21.4 (70.5)	21.1 (70.0)	26.6 (79.9)	25.2 (77.4)	27.6 (81.7)	28.3 (82.9)	28.1 (82.6)	25.8 (78.4)	22.8 (73.0)	20.8 (69.4)	28.3 (82.9)
Mean daily maximum °C (°F)	16.6 (61.9)	16.2 (61.2)	16.7 (62.1)	17.3 (63.1)	19.0 (66.2)	21.2 (70.2)	24.2 (75.6)	25.3 (77.5)	24.2 (75.6)	21.7 (71.1)	19.2 (66.6)	17.3 (63.1)	19.9 (67.9)
Daily mean °C (°F)	14.3 (57.7)	13.9 (57.0)	14.3 (57.7)	14.8 (58.6)	16.5 (61.7)	18.6 (65.5)	21.2 (70.2)	22.3 (72.1)	21.4 (70.5)	19.0 (66.2)	16.9 (62.4)	15.2 (59.4)	17.4 (63.3)
Mean daily minimum °C (°F)	12.0 (53.6)	11.5 (52.7)	12.0 (53.6)	12.2 (54.0)	13.9 (57.0)	16.0 (60.8)	18.3 (64.9)	19.3 (66.7)	18.6 (65.5)	16.3 (61.3)	14.5 (58.1)	13.0 (55.4)	14.8 (58.6)
Record low °C (°F)	4.8 (40.6)	4.9 (40.8)	4.7 (40.5)	5.0 (41.0)	8.6 (47.5)	10.5 (50.9)	13.8 (56.8)	13.4 (56.1)	10.7 (51.3)	10.9 (51.6)	7.5 (45.5)	5.3 (41.5)	4.7 (40.5)
Average rainfall mm (inches)	95.3 (3.75)	117.8 (4.64)	88.6 (3.49)	71.4 (2.81)	74.9 (2.95)	54.9 (2.16)	34.0 (1.34)	66.8 (2.63)	94.0 (3.70)	102.4 (4.03)	136.3 (5.37)	122.9 (4.84)	1,059.3 (41.71)
Average relative humidity (%)	82	83	83	82	83	83	81	82	82	82	83	83	82
Source: IPMA

=== Ecoregions/Protected areas ===
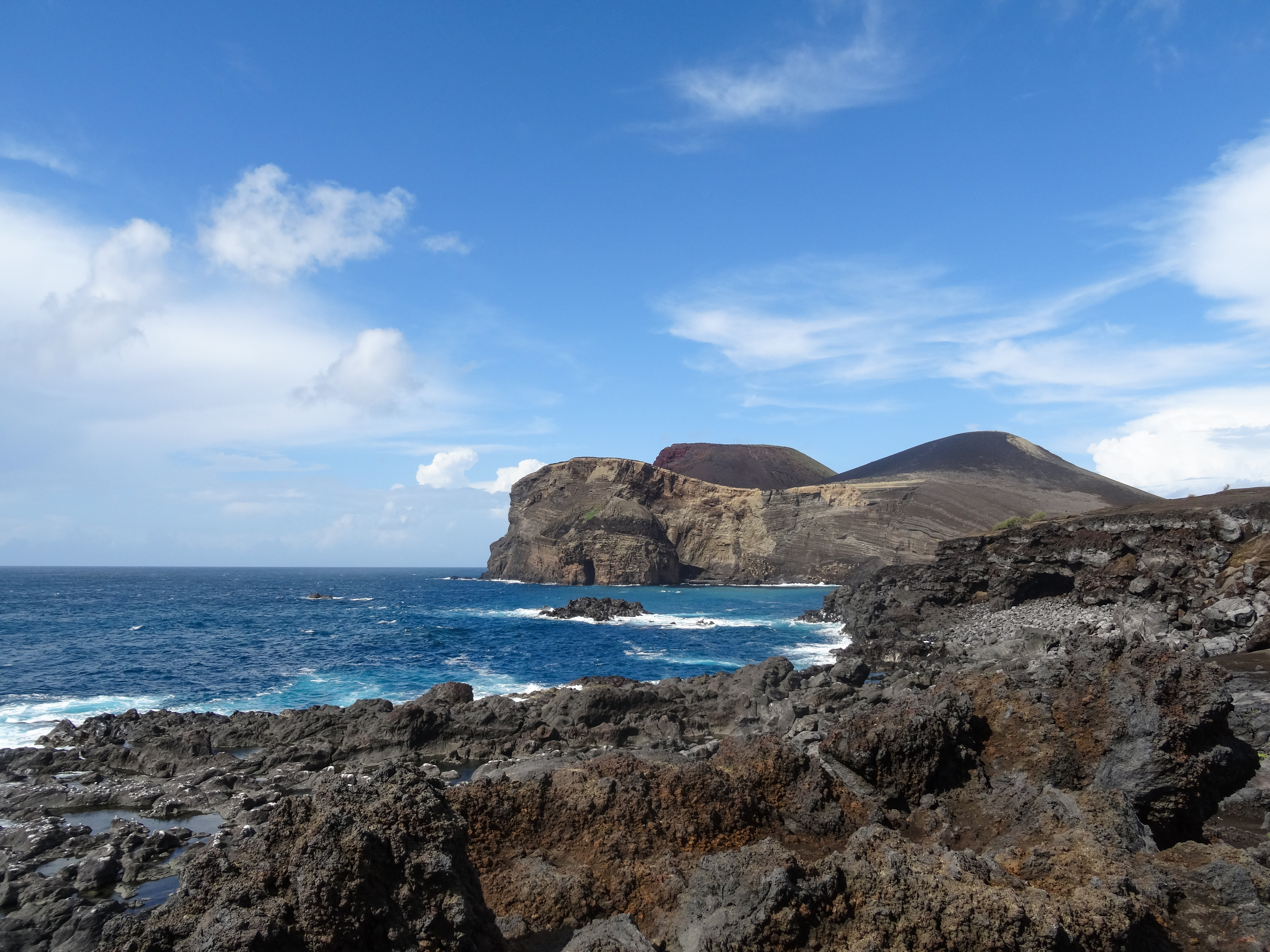
Capelinhos Volcano and Ponta dos Capelinhos (including Lighthouse)

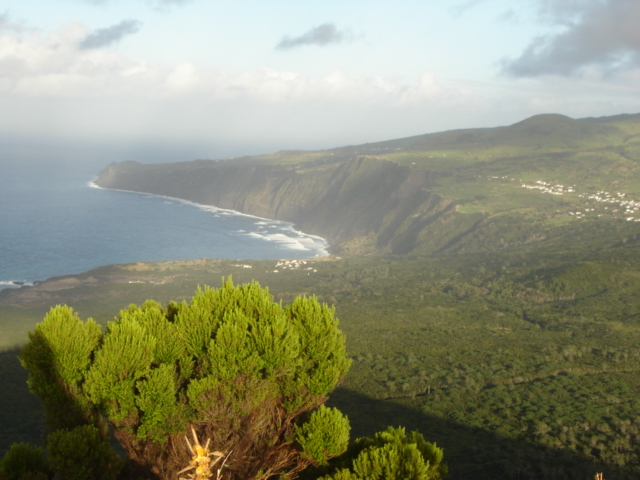
North coast as seen from Cabeço Verde

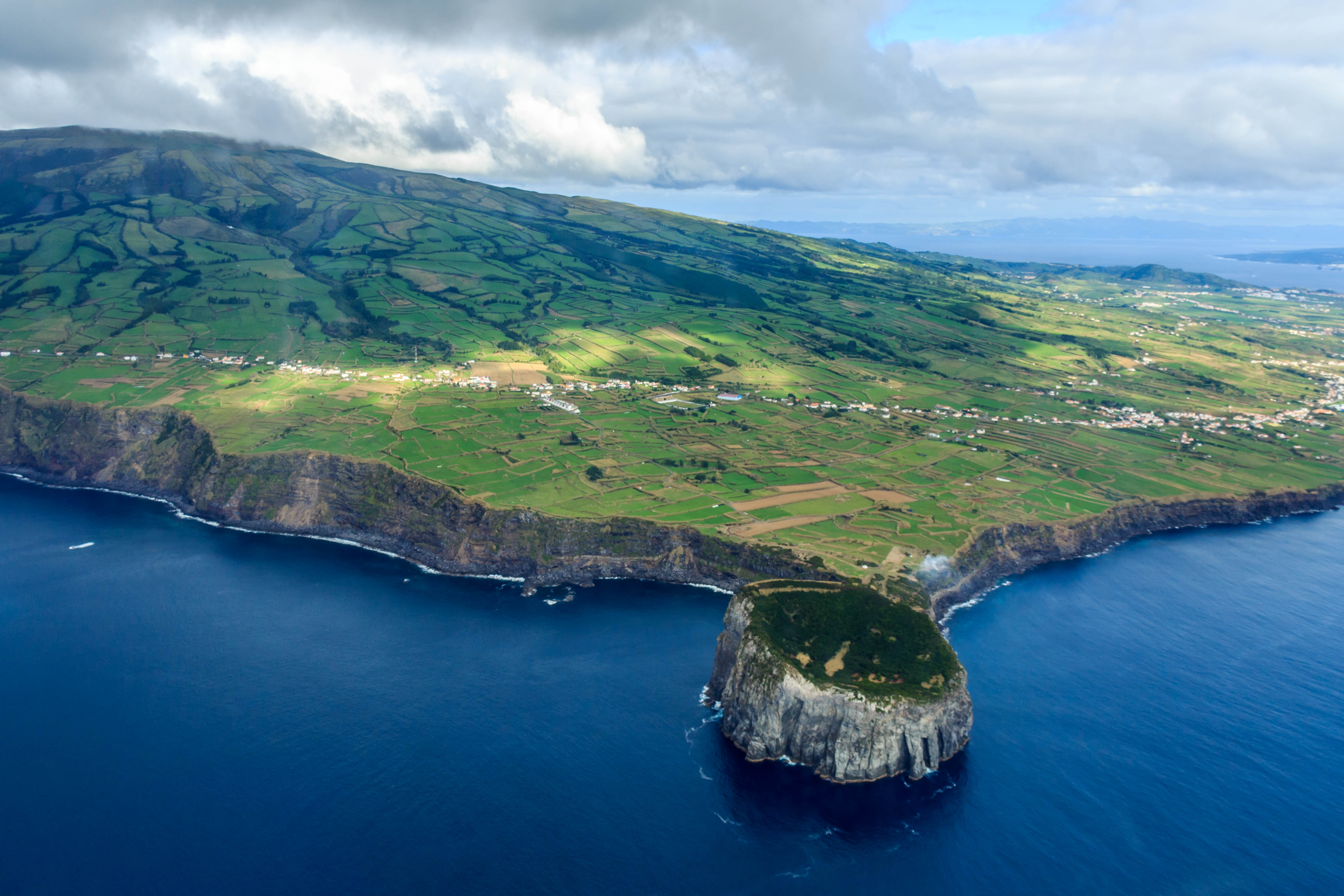
Morro do Castelo Branco

In 2008, the Regional Government of the Azores established a comprehensive administrative framework to administer and promote the various environmental ecosystems of the island. These areas were reorganized under Regional Legislative Decree 46/2008/A, into the Faial Nature Park, that includes 13 protected areas:

Nature Reserves

- [FAI01] Nature Reserve of the Caldeirinhas (Portuguese: Reserva Natural das Caldeirinhas)
- [FAI02] Nature Reserve of the Caldeira (Portuguese: Reserva Natural da Caldeira do Faial)
- [FAI03] Nature Reserve of the Morro do Castelo Branco (Portuguese: Reserva Natural do Morro do Castelo Branco)

Protected Areas for the Management of Habitats and Coast Species

- [FAI04] Protected Area of Cabeço do Fogo (Portuguese: Área Protegida para a Gestão de Habitats ou Espécies do Cabeço do Fogo)
- [FAI05] Protected Area of Capelinhos, Northwest Coast and Varadouro (Portuguese: Área Protegida para a Gestão de Habitats ou Espécies dos Capelinhos, Costa Noroeste e Varadouro)
- [FAI06] Protected Area of Varadouro-Castelo Branco (Portuguese: Área Protegida para a Gestão de Habitats ou Espécies Varadouro-Castelo Branco)
- [FAI07] Protected Area of Lomba Grande (Portuguese: Área Protegida para a Gestão de Habitats ou Espécies Lomba Grande)

Protected Landscapes

- [FAI08] Protected Landscape of Monte da Guia (Portuguese: Área de Paisagem Protegida do Monte da Guia)
- [FAI09] Protected Landscape of the Central Zone (Portuguese: Área de Paisagem Protegida da Zona Central)

Protected Areas for the Management of Resources

- [FAI10] Protected Resource Area of the (Faial Sector) Faial-Pico Channel (Portuguese: Área Protegida de Gestão de Recursos do Canal Faial-Pico/Sector Faial)
- [FAI11] Protected Resource Area of Castelo Branco (Portuguese: Área Protegida de Gestão de Recursos do Castelo Branco)
- [FAI12] Protected Resource Area of Capelinhos (Portuguese: Área Protegida de Gestão de Recursos dos Capelinhos)
- [FAI13] Protected Resource Area of Cedros (Portuguese: Área Protegida de Gestão de Recursos dos Cedros)

In addition, there are a few instituted forest reserves on the island of Faial, under the authority of the Direcção Regional de Recursos Florestais (Regional Directorate for Forest Services):

- Forest Reserve of Capelo (Portuguese: Reserva Florestal do Capelo)
- Forest Reserve of Cabouco Velho (Portuguese: Reserva Florestal do Cabouco Velho)
- Recreational Forest Reserve of Falca (Portuguese: Reserva Florestal de Recreio da Falca)

Other areas of geological or environmental interest:

- Anelares Grotto (Portuguese: Gruta dos Anelares), located along the southern road of the Ribeira da Lombega, in Castelo Branco, this is a geological formation produced from a lava tube near the mountainous coast: it extends 35.5 meters from Ribeira da Lombega, is 2.5 meters wide and is 3.7 meters at its highest point.

While diving in the Faial-Pico canal in 2013, the submarine Lula1000 discovered a coral reef 280–300 metres (920–980 ft) in depth and covering an area of 1,000 square metres (11,000 ft^{2}). In a communiqué to the Rebikoff–Niggeler Foundation, the group suggested that the reef formation was an important first discovery for the submarine team, which was located in the waters of the Azores since 1994, in order to document sea depth. Until this time, there were no documented records of coral reefs at such a depth in the waters of the Azores, nor at such a distance from Faial.

=== Human geography ===
Administratively, the island is governed as one municipality, with its government seat in the city of Horta. Operationally, there are thirteen civil parishes with their own assemblies, three of which (Angústias, Matriz, and Conceição) constitute the principal urbanized core:

- Angústias; urban parish that includes the escoria cones of Monte da Guia, Monte Escuro and Monte Carneiro, as well as the island's hospital, the major hotels, the commercial and container port, and many historical buildings (such as the Fort of Santa Cruz, The Cedars, and the Church of Nossa Senhora das Angústias): 3,025 inhabitants (2003).
- Conceição; urbanized and rural parish connected to the city of Horta, with 1,157 inhabitants in 2001. It was one of the nuclei of the modern city of Horta, the location of the historic forts of Alagoa and Bom Jesus, and the location of the Courts building and Fayal Sport Club (and football field).
- Matriz; the urban heart of the city of Horta, with 2,523 inhabitants (2001); landmarks include the Horta Museum, Sociedade Recreativa Amor da Pátria, Império dos Nobres, the historic Clock Tower, the former Walter Bensaúde Hospital and the Horta Archive and the Public Library, as well as the location of the Municipal Government (Câmara Municipal da Horta).
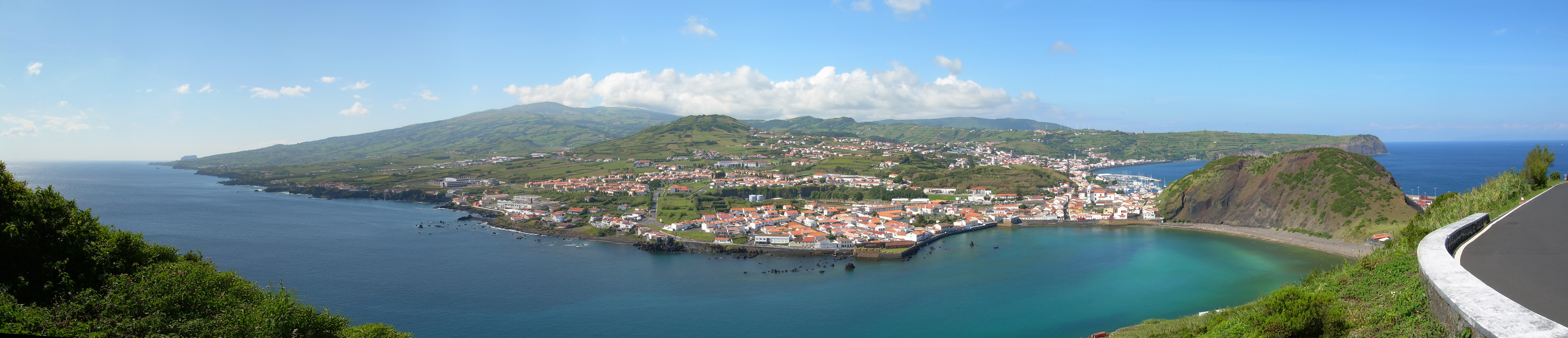
The urbanized city of Horta, seen from Monte da Guia (looking towards Cabeço Gordo stratovolcano), showing principally the civil parish of Angústias

The remainder of the parishes (except Flamengos) circle the island, all linked by the regional road network and its ancillary roads:

- Flamengos; one of the first nuclei of settlement and colonization, and the only interior/landlocked parish in the municipality of Horta founded by Flemish colonists and Portuguese settlers from the archipelago.
- Praia do Almoxarife; the beachhead of the early colonists to Faial, Almoxarife is a coastal parish on the east coast, located between Ponta da Espalamaca and Lomba dos Frades, and known for its black sand beach.
- Pedro Miguel; located on the eastern coast between Lomba dos Frades and Lomba Grande, its 723 inhabitants lost their primary place of worship, the Church of Nossa Senhora da Ajuda, during the 1998 earthquake.
- Ribeirinha; nestled in the river valley of the Pedro Miguel Graben and existing along the fracture zone of the Ribeirinha Volcanic complex along the north-northeast coast, Riberinha has experienced many seismic events historically.
- Salão; the smallest parish by population situated on the northern coast of Faial, a community built by Spanish settlers who were later expelled following the end of the Iberian Union.
- Cedros; built on the coastal cliffs of the Cedros Plateau along the northern coast, it is the oldest parish on Faial; involved in agriculture and dairy industry (including the milk cooperative C.A.L.F).
- Praia do Norte; a zone of recent historical volcanism, built on layers of ash and pyroclastic deposits, the parish became "extinct" between 1672 and 1845 following the eruption of Cabeço do Fogo, which depopulated the parish. Emigration also occurred following the eruption of Capelinhos in 1957–58.
- Capelo; a parish built along a linear series of volcanic cones, including Capelinhos off the western coast; its eruption in 1957–58 led to the implementation of an immigration program spearheaded by Senator John F. Kennedy that reduced the population of Faial and Capelo.
- Castelo Branco; location of the international airport, its 1,115 inhabitants are involved in a mix of agricultural and enterprises associated with primary and secondary industries along the southern coast that includes the micro-climate of Varadouro.
- Feteira; a parish dominated by agriculture, the inhabitants are equally tied to the commercial activities in Horta, and have become a suburb of the larger city.

Numerous earthquakes and seismic events have impacted Faial throughout its populated history. The most important were the earthquakes and aftershocks that occurred around Christmas and New Year's Day in 1759–1760. Similar in nature was the 1926 earthquake that rumbled the city of Horta, in early-April, where damages were reported in Flamengos, Ribeirinha, and Conceição. Then, on August 31 at 8:42, a new earthquake caused eight deaths and destroyed buildings in Horta, as well as the parishes of Conceição, Praia do Almoxarife (ruining 220 homes), Flamengos, Feteira, and Castelo Branco, Salao, and most of the Lomba do Pilar. Approximately 4,138 homes and buildings were partially or totally damaged. The years 1957–1958 (Capelinhos eruption), 1963, and 1973 all experienced similar tremors and events. The 1998 Azores earthquake on July 9, which shook the islands of Faial, Pico, and São Jorge at 07:19 (its epicentre north-northeast of Faial), measured 5.6 on the Richter scale and caused damage to the parishes of Riberinha, Pedro Miguel, Salão, and Cedros, as well as more extensive damage in Castelo Branco (mainly Lombega), Flamengos, and Praia do Almoxarife. Eight people died in the earthquake, and 1,700 were left homeless.

== Economy ==
Faial's early economic growth was propelled by the cultivation and processing of woad, a blue-coloured dye produced from the plant Isatis tinctoria. It was the only source for blue dye until the end of the 16th century, when Portuguese trade routes started bringing indigo from the Far East. Economic and population growth was also spearheaded by legends of tin and silver perpetuated by members of the Portuguese court.

The island economy experienced a degree of prosperity until 1957, when the Capelinhos Volcano erupted in the western part of the island, reactivating emigration to North America, encouraged by promises of aid made by Massachusetts senator John F. Kennedy to the affected populations.

The main agricultural commodities of the island are potatoes, cereals, fruits, and wines, along with cattle (which make up its dairy and meat industry). The city of Horta is the centre of commerce and services on the island.

In the 1970s, after the Carnation Revolution, Portugal experienced economic growth, and an airport was opened; with it, tourists came. After Portugal entered into the European Economic Community (EEC), the standard of living rapidly grew and today the population is generally prosperous.

== Architecture ==
Faial is a tourist destination with a rich collection of historical, natural, and modern attractions that bring yachts, cruise ships, tourist groups, and naturalists to the hills and towns of the island. Apart from several hotels and bed & breakfasts scattered throughout the parishes, the visitor seeking sun will likely travel to the black sand beaches of Praia de Almoxarife, Conceição and Porto Pim, as well as the rock pools scattered along the coast. Varadouro is one such place, known for its warmer waters, micro-climate, summer cottages, and extensive salt-water pools open to the ocean.

=== Civic ===
- Termas do Varadouro (Thermal Spa of Varadouro)
- Geological Museum of the Volcano
- Interpretative Center of the Capelinhos Volcano (including the Capelinhos lighthouse)
- Escola de Artesanto do Capelo (School of Handicrafts)

=== Military ===
- Fort of Santa Cruz
- World War Two Artillery Batteries

=== Religious ===
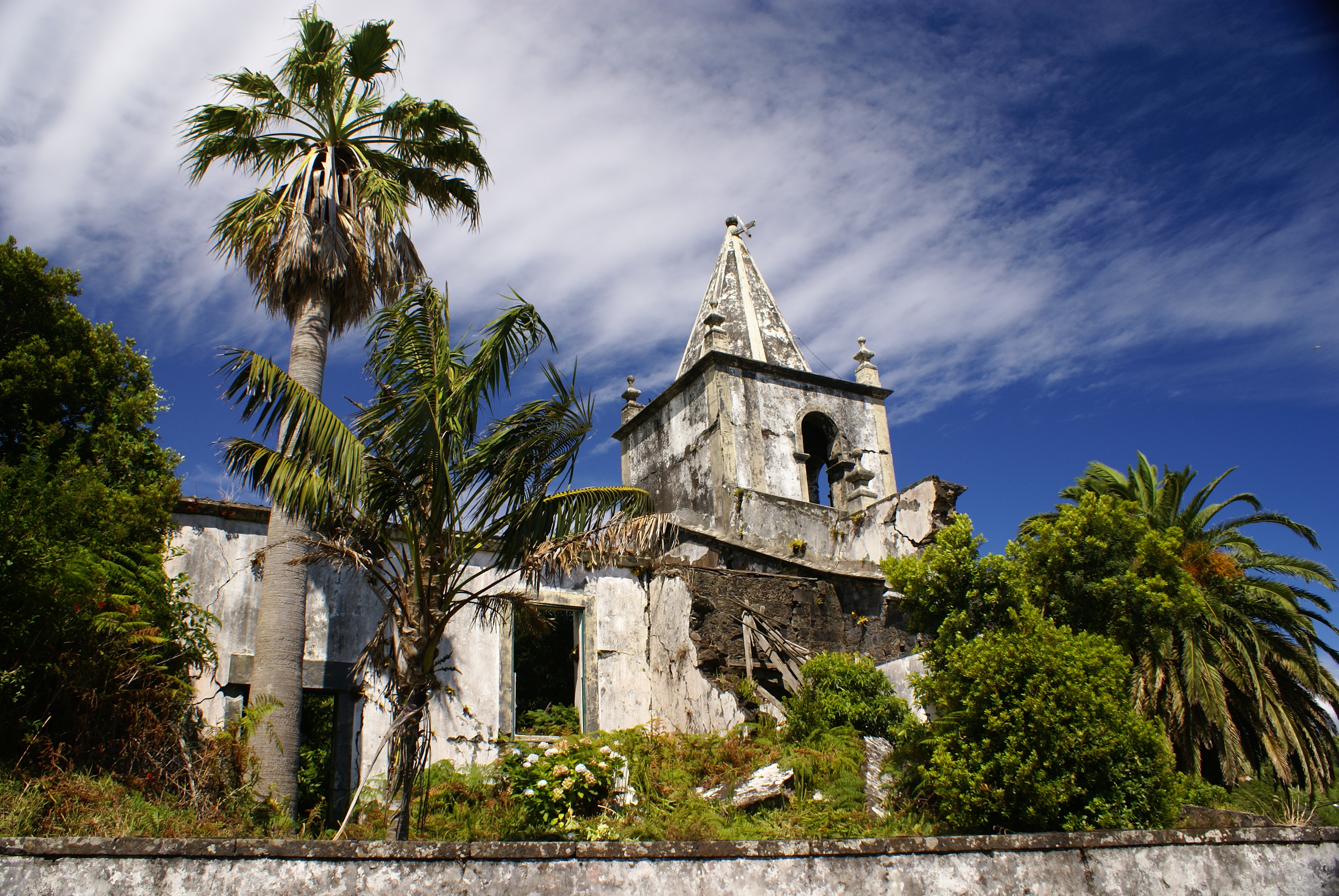
Nossa Senhora da Ajuda Church, a church in Pedro Miguel, destroyed by an earthquake in 1998

- Chapel of Nossa Senhora de Esperança – ruined chapel on the grounds of the parochial church, Capelo
- Chapel of Nossa Senhora do Carmo – located in Varadouro, Capelo
- Chapel of São Pedro – abandoned chapel to St. Peter, located in Feteira
- Church of Santa Catarina de Alexandria – situated in Castelo Branco
- Church of Santissima Trinidade (Holy Trinity) – located in Capelo
- Church of the Divino Espírito Santo – one of the oldest churches on the island, located in Feteira
- Church of Nossa Senhora das Dores - Praia do Norte

== Culture ==
=== Festivities ===
Faial has a calendar that includes several secular and religious festivals. The most important ones occur in the summer. From Ascension Day until August, the feasts of the Holy Spirit are major events in each parish and neighborhood. During these events, a procession goes to the local church, a mass is celebrated there in conformity with a tradition/legend of Saint Elizabeth of Portugal, and then the procession returns to the local império, where a feast of meat broth and soup is served to the invited guests, and the same soup and massa sovada (sweet bread) is handed out as a traditional sign of penitence. On Faial, generally, these feasts are by invitation, whereas on other islands they are open to the public.

The patron saint of Faial is Saint John, celebrated as São João da Caldeira, on June 24. This is a day celebrated with a mass at the Chapel of São João, followed by family picnics along the roadways and fields of the Caldera. Similarly, in Largo Jaime Melo in Horta, people gather from around the island to enjoy picnics, and other diversions (such as band music and/or singers).

On August 1, people celebrate the annual feast of Nossa Senhora da Guia, a celebration originally started by local fisherman in the name of the Virgin Mary. A flotilla of small boats with one carrying the statue of the Virgin arrives in the harbor at Port Pim. From there, following benedictions, the statue is taken in procession to the top of Monte da Guia, where mass is celebrated in the chapel of Monte da Guia.

The most important festival of the Faialense calendar is the secular Semana do Mar (Sea Week). It is a week-long celebration in Horta of Faial's link to the sea, celebrated in song, dance, exhibitions and kiosks selling different foods (of local and continental Portugal) and goods. During the day there are several sailing competitions and exhibits, while in the evening while many sample foods along the Avenida Marginal. Others listen and/or dance to popular and/or traditional musical acts on one of several platforms devoted to bands, traditional and modern/contemporary musical artists. The events culminate with a traditional closing ceremony and fireworks display.

=== Tradition ===
The island, like some other Azorean islands, produces cheeses and other milk products, along with beef, and by-products notable in Portugal. Its cuisine features local seafood.

Scrimshaw, handiwork made of whale teeth, is a traditional craft of the Azores. Other types of handiwork traditionally created on the island include straw embroideries on tulle, flowers made from fish scales, decorations in cut paper, as well as crochet lace-work with characteristic motifs.

== Notable people ==
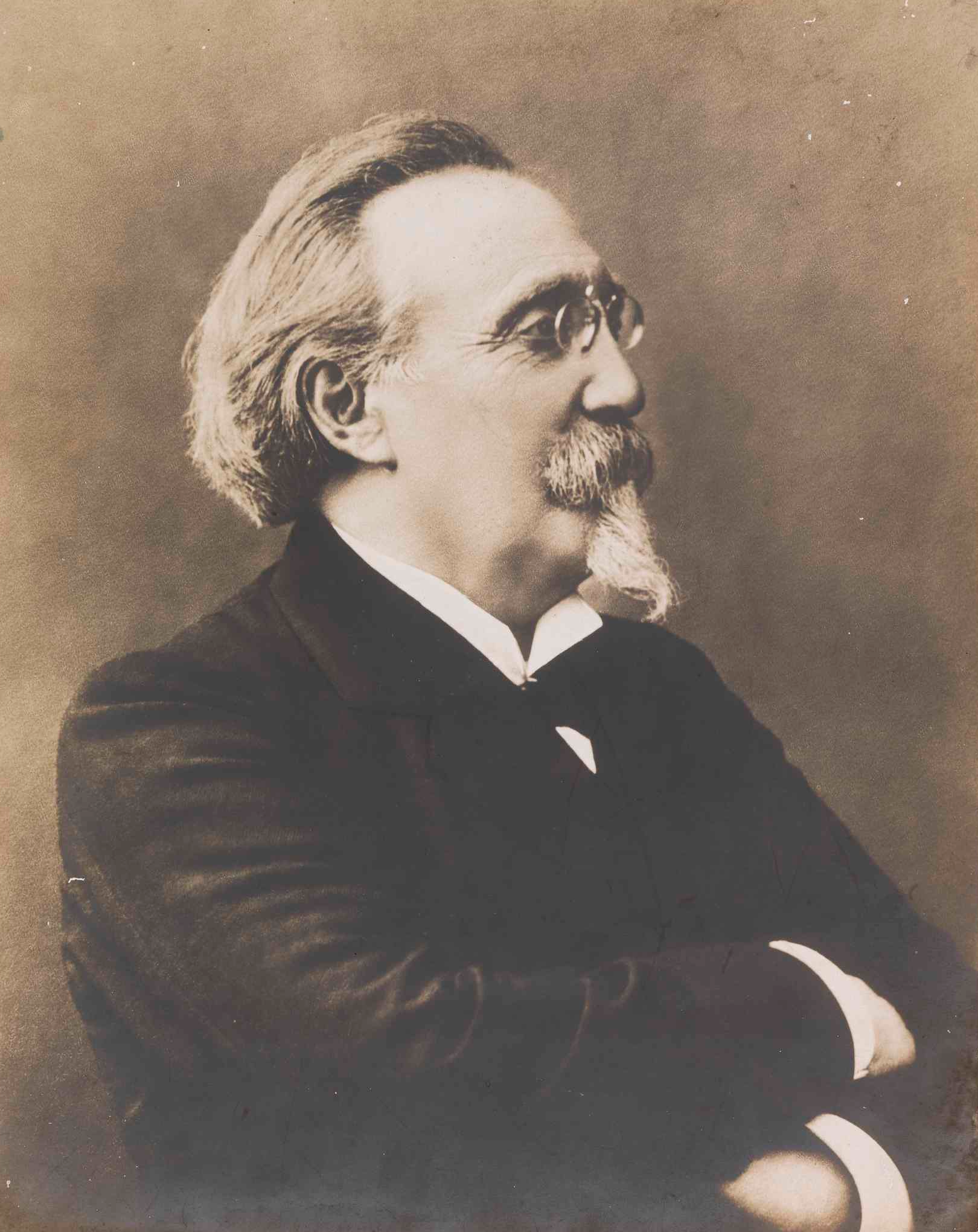
Manuel de Arriaga, ca.1905

- António José de Ávila (1807–1881) Mayor of Horta and 27th, 32nd and 34th Prime Minister of Portugal 1868–1878
- Manuel de Arriaga (1840–1917) a lawyer, the first elected President of the First Portuguese Republic
- António José de Ávila, 2nd Marquis of Ávila and Bolama (1842–1917) a military officer, politician, member of the nobility
- José de Almeida de Ávila (1844–1902) Portuguese Marine and Civil Governor of the district of Horta 1894/5
- Teresa Madruga (born 1953) a Portuguese actress
- Ana Luís (born 1976) a former economist and 11th President of the Legislative Assembly of the Azores

== See also ==
- List of volcanoes in Azores
- Condor seamount, a submarine mountain located at 17 km west-southwest of Faial Island

== Sources ==
- Daniel, Luís; Soares, Natacha, eds. (2003). Faial, Açores: Guia do Património Cultural [Faial, Azores: Guide to the Cultural Heritage] (in Portuguese). Horta (Azores), Portugal: Atlantic View – Actividades Turísticos, Lda.
- Caldas, J. V. (2000). Atlântida, vol.XLV. Instituto Açoreano de Cultura, Angra do Heroísmo.
- Frutuoso, G. (2003). Saudades da Terra, Vol.6. Instituto Cultural de Ponta Delgada.
- Lucidus (1988). Atlas Turístico: Açores. Lucidus Publicações, Lda., Lisbon.
- Scarth, A.; J. C. Tanguy (2001). Volcanoes of Europe. Oxford University Press. p. 243 pp. ISBN 0-19-521754-3.
- Tostões, A.; F. J. Silva; J. Vieira; M. Lurdes Janeiro; N. Barcelos; V. Mestre (1989). Arquitectura Popular dos Açores. Ordem dos Arquitectos, Ponta Delgada.
- Brandão, Raul (1926). As Ilhas Desconhecidas [The Unknown Islands] (PDF). Lisbon, Portugal: Livrarias Aillaud & Bertrand. Archived from the original on 2014-09-25.
- "Fayal". Global Volcanism Program. Smithsonian Institution.
- Machado, Adriane; Azevedo, José M. M.; Alemeida, Delia P. M.; Farid Chemale Jr. (2008). "Geochemistry of Volcanic Rocks from Faial Island (Azores)" (PDF). 5 (1). Lisbon: e-Terra, GEOTIC – Sociedade Geológica de Portugal: 1–14. Archived from the original (PDF) on 2011-05-11.
- Rocha, Gilberta Pavão Nunes (2007). "A população da ilha do Faial no contexto açoriano 1950–1970" [Faial Population in the Azorean Archipelago 1950–1970] (PDF) (in Portuguese). 16. Horta (Azores), Portugal: Boletim do Núcleo Cultural da Horta: 117–136. Archived from the original on June 24, 2009.
