= Tambroso =

Mountain peak on Faial, Azores

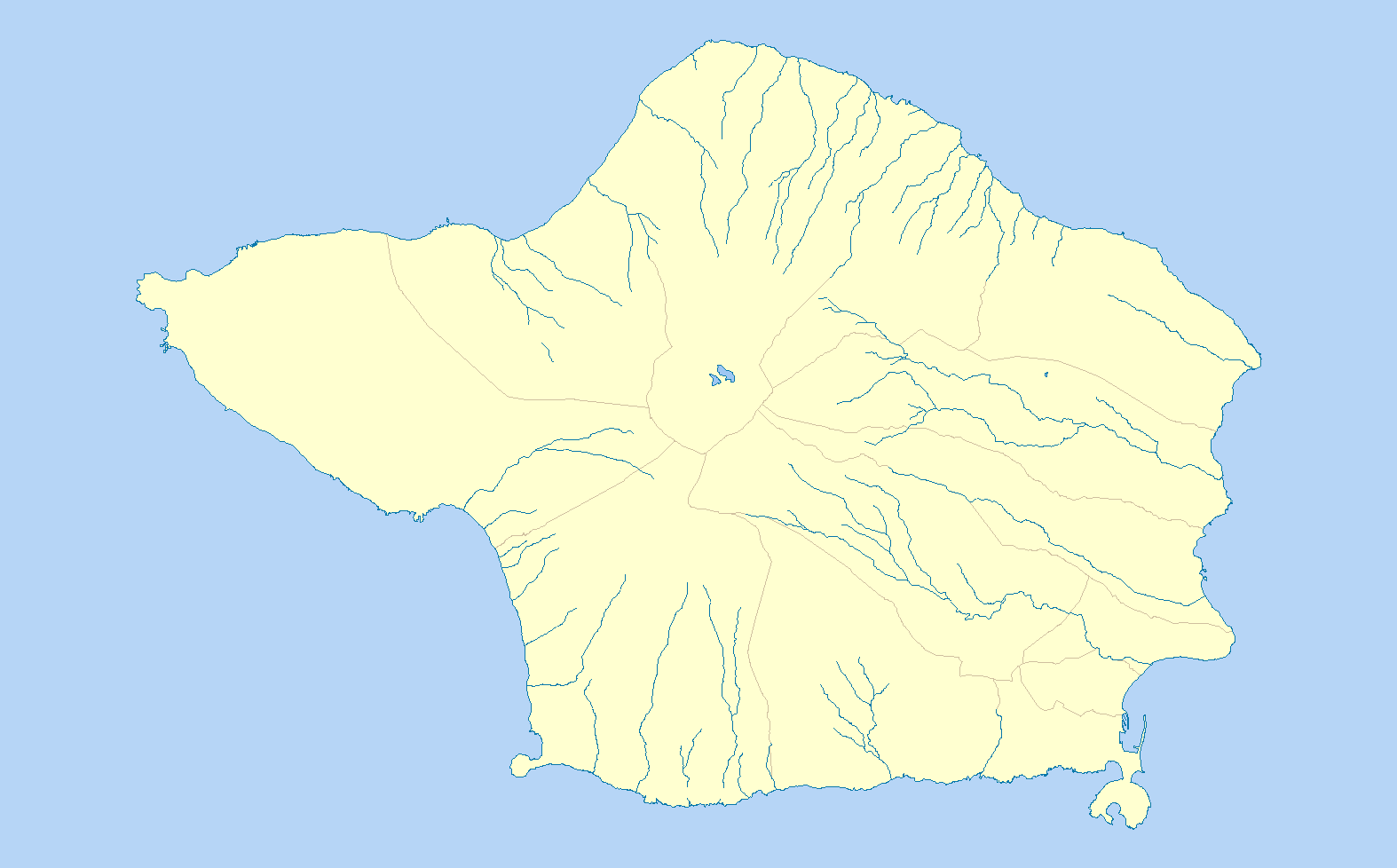
- Location within Faial

Highest point
- Elevation: 497 m (1,631 ft)
- Prominence: 506 m (1,660 ft)
- Coordinates: 38°35′59.99″N 28°39′0″W

Naming
- Language of name: Portuguese

Geography
- Parent range: Cabeço Gordo

Tambroso is a mountain peak on the Azorian island of Faial. It is located in the civil parish of Ribeirinha, in the municipality of Horta. The mountain, as well as its surrounding land-forms, is geographically close to the volcanic caldera at the center of Faial. The eruptive igneous rocks produced by this caldera forms the base of Tambroso, as well as many other peaks on Faial Island. The whole series of peaks has a maximum elevation at Cabeço Gordo, which is 1,043 metres (3,422 ft) above sea level.

== Geography and geology ==
The elevation of Tambroso itself reaches to 506 metres (1,660 ft) above sea-level. It is situated near another local peak, Alto da Pedreira, and the town of Ribeirinha. Climatically, the mountain is situated in a temperate ocean climate, as is the rest of Faial Island.

The rocks that make up much of the Azores are generally related to a triple junction which produces Neogene-aged, intrusive and extrusive/ eruptive, mafic igneous rocks, and sedimentary formations derived from them. The rocks that form Tamborso are mapped as part of the Cedros volcanic complex. The lower portion of this volcanic complex's formation began in the middle Pleistocene's Chibanian age, while upper portion consists mainly of pyroclastic flows and other deposits that date from the late Pleistocene up to the year 1958, which marked the most recent eruption on Faial Island. The area around the base of Tambroso may also be affected by uplift and other types crustal movement along an east-west trending fault which is situation to the south of the mountain.

== See also ==
- Geography of the Azores
