= 1926 Horta earthquake =

Coordinates: 38.534583°N 28.629568°W

The 1926 Horta earthquake (Portuguese: Sismo da Horta de 1926/Terramoto da Horta), occurred at 8:42 a.m. (local time) on 31 August. It caused the destruction of many of the buildings located in the city of Horta, the central group of the Portuguese autonomous region of the Azores, resulting in the death of nine and the partial or complete destruction of 4,138 buildings.

== Earthquake ==
From April 1926 onwards, the island of Faial was rocked by a series of tremors that increased in intensity, until 5 April. On this date, a singular event resulted in destruction or damage to buildings in the civil parishes of Flamengos, Ribeirinha and Conceição, in particular in the localitiesof Farrobo, Lomba and Espalhafatos.

On 31 August, at about 8:40 in the morning, the islands were raised by a violent earthquake with its epicentre centralized in the Faial-Pico Channel, at a depth of 1.6–4 kilometres (0.99–2.49 mi) and with a body wave magnitude of 5.3–5.9. The earthquake progressed to a Mercalli Intensity of X (Extreme) in the northern part of Horta (around Conceição). The shock resulted in the death of nine people, with 200 injured, and the general destruction of many of the heritage buildings located in that region of the city.

The greatest damage occurred in the urban parish of Conceição and rural parishes of Praia do Almoxarife (where of the 220 homes, only 16 continued to be habitable), Flamengos, Feteira and Castelo Branco, in addition to the areas between Lomba do Pilar and Salão. In all, approximately 4,138 homes were partially or totally destroyed.

== See also ==
- List of earthquakes in 1926
- List of earthquakes in the Azores
