= Pedro Miguel (Horta) =

- Civil parish
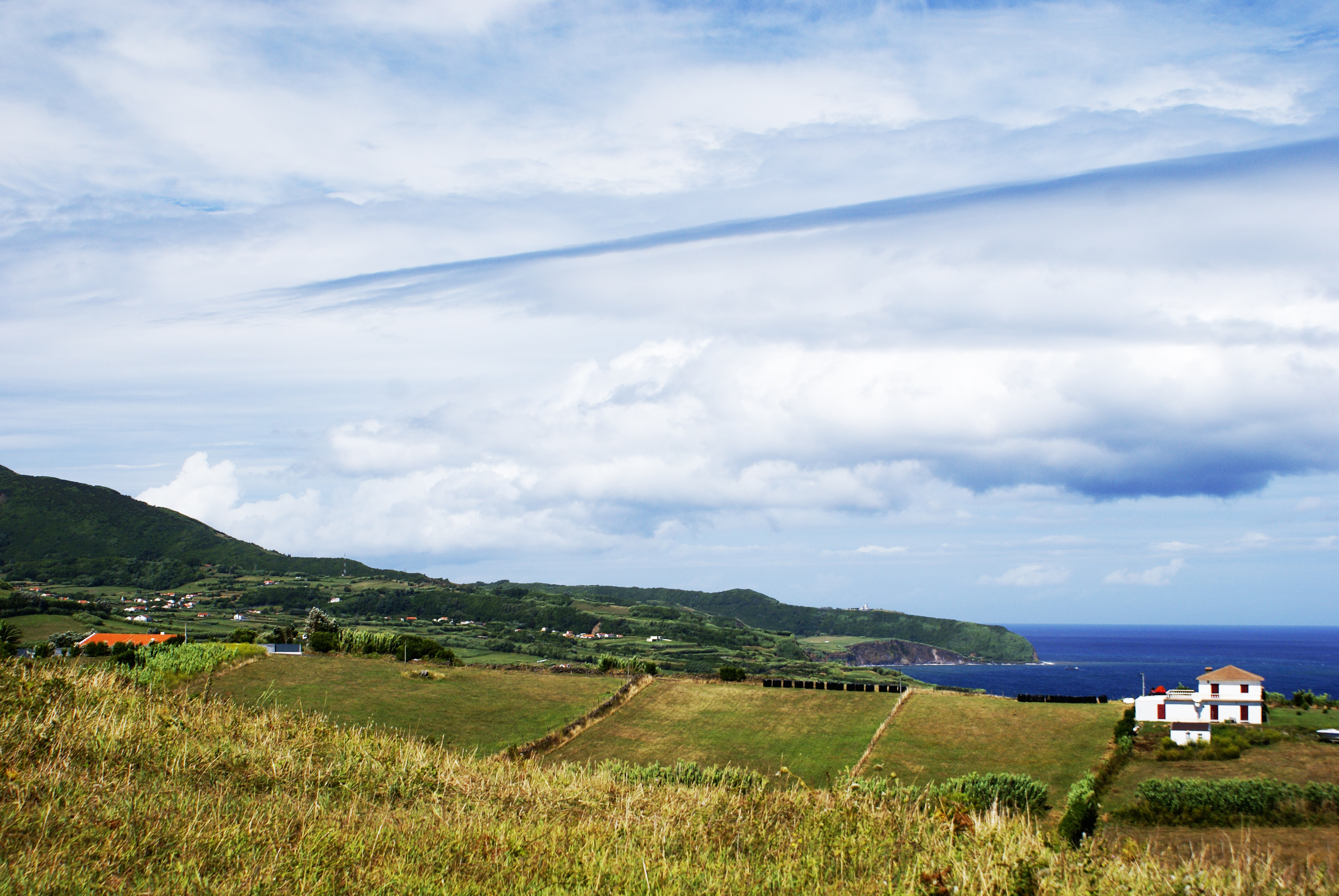
- Ponta de João Dias promontory, in the civil parish of Pedro Miguel, showing the eastern coast of Faial to Ribeirinha

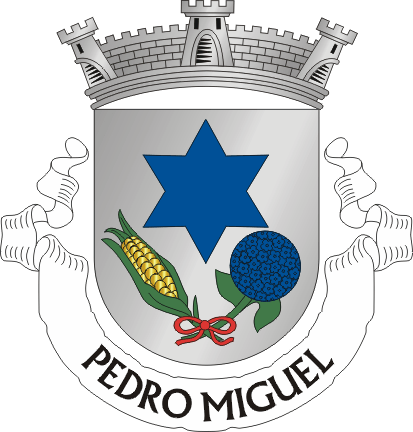
- Coat of arms

- Location of the civil parish of Pedro Miguel within the municipality of Horta
- Coordinates: 38°34′29″N 28°37′7″W
- Country: Portugal
- Auton. region: Azores
- Island: Faial
- Municipality: Horta
- Established: Settlement: fl.1600 Parish: c.1616

Area
  - Total: 14.48 km^{2} (5.59 sq mi)
- Elevation: 121 m (397 ft)

Population (2011)
  - Total: 759
  - Density: 52.4/km^{2} (136/sq mi)
- Time zone: UTC−01:00 (AZOT)
  - Summer (DST): UTC+00:00 (AZOST)
- Postal code: 9900-429
- Area code: 292
- Patron: Nossa Senhora da Ajuda
- Website: http://www.jfpedromiguel.pt/

Pedro Miguel (pronounced [ˈpe.dɾu mi.ˈɡɛl]) is a freguesia ("civil parish") in the northeastern part of the municipality of Horta on the island of Faial in the Azores. Pedro Miguel is located 6 km north of the city of Horta on the main regional road that encircles the island. The population in 2011 was 759, in an area of 14.48 km^{2}.

== History ==
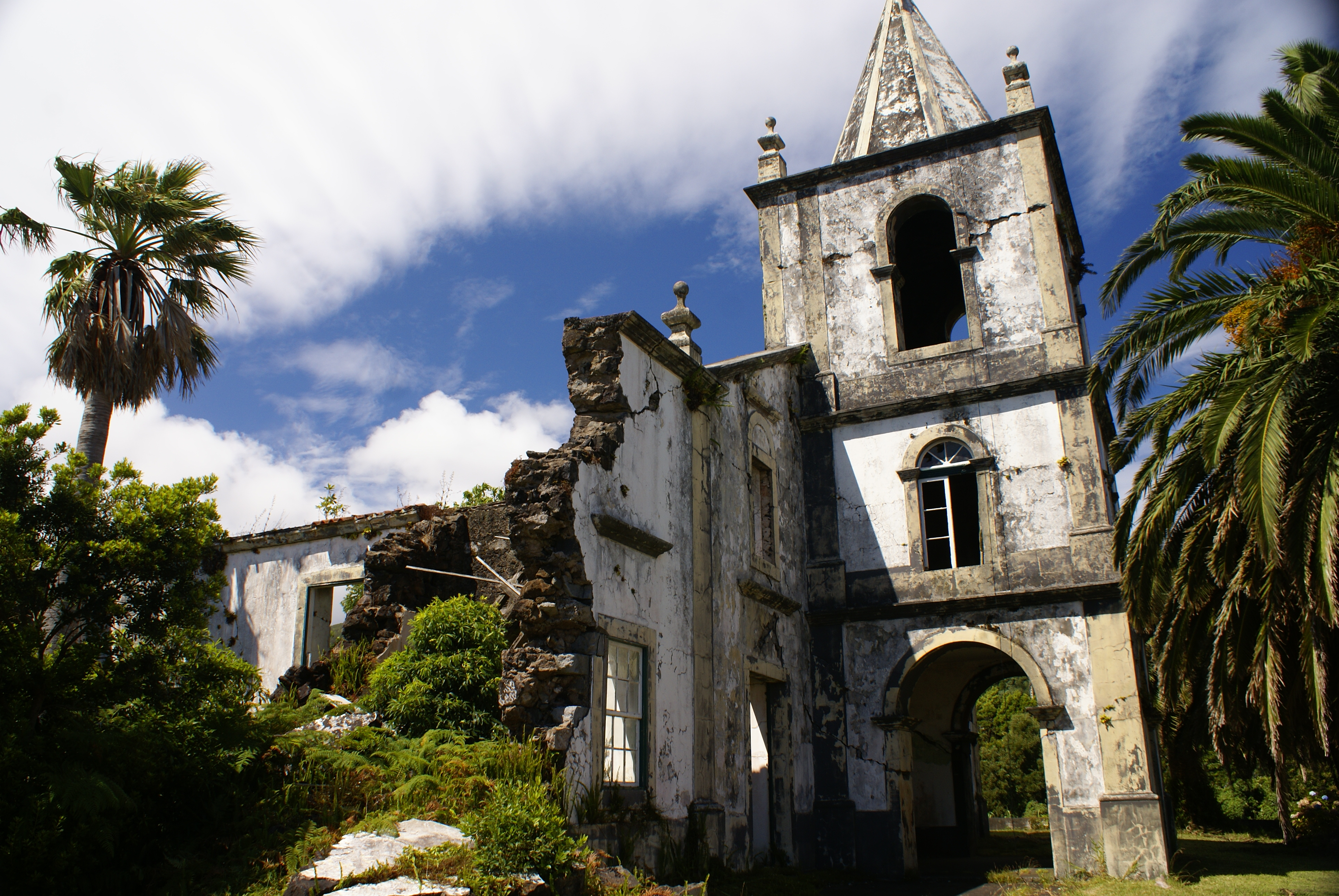
The remnants of the Church of Nossa Senhora da Ajuda, irreparably damaged after the 1998 earthquake

The first record of the parish, which was named for one of the original inhabitants, dated August 7, 1590, came from a financial transaction between King Sebastian who sent the vicar 25 thousand reis (ostensibly for construction or furnishing of their church).

Pedro Miguel became a parish in 1666. In order to protect itself from surprise attacks by pirates that roamed the Canal, a small fort Forte Baixo was constructed in the 17th century.

In 1871, both a boys' and a girls' school operated from Pedro Miguel, since the community was part of a greater district that included Ribeirinha and Praia do Almoxarife. A justice of the peace operated from this district, where the electoral assembly was also situated. The population had reached 1,757 inhabitants by this time.

During the 1998 earthquake, which hit affected the northern communities of the island, several houses were damaged and the parochial church was irreparably damaged.

== Geography ==
Population of Pedro Miguel (1643 - 2001)
Year	Pop.	±%
1643	384	—
1871	1,757	+357.6%
2001	723	−58.9%

The parish of Pedro Miguel is situated in an area between Lomba dos Frades and Lomba Grande, and is bisected by the Ribeira de Pedro Miguel. It contains the localities Abegoaria, Arrochela, Atras da Ladeira, Caminho Redondo, Grota Funda, Rua da Igreja and Rua Velha.

=== Ecoregions/Protected areas ===
Grota Funda is a cave located in a large volcanic crater located west of the parish centre, and which founded fragments of vegetable coals.

== Economy ==
The communities economy revolved around mainly cereals and agricultural, as well as many orange orchards located closer to the center. The dairy industry was also an important contributor, and the Pedro Miguel was a major producer of local exports (most importantly butter).

== Culture ==
Founded on 23 June 1977, the Grupo Folclórico e Etnográfico de Pedro Miguel (English: Folklore and Ethnographic Group of Pedro Miguel) was established to perpetuate some of the traditions of the community, including folklore, song, dance and ethnographic representations. Using stylized period costumes, dating to late 19th and early 20th century, the group has travelled throughout the island and archipelago to present their brand of traditional culture. The large group (in 2011 about 41 members) of varying ages (13 to 60 years) promoted their first recorded CD in 2011, entitled Ao Toque da Viola.
