= Pedro Miguel =

Pedro Miguel may refer to:

- Pedro Miguel (Horta), a civil parish in the municipality of Horta
- Pedro Miguel Etxenike, a Spanish physicist
- Pedro Miguel González, Panamanian politician
- Pedro Miguel Arce, Nicaraguan actor
- Pedro Miguel Neves, Portuguese basketball player
- Pedro Miguel Fault, Seismic fault of Panama
- Pedro Dias (footballer, born 1973), also known as Pedro Miguel Dias, Portuguese footballer
- Pedro Miguel Schiaffino, Peruvian chef
- Pauleta, also known as Pedro Miguel Pauleta, Portuguese footballer
- Pedro Miguel Aráoz, Argentine priest
- Pedro Miguel (footballer), Qatari footballer
