= Valentim Fernandes =

Portuguese printer (died 1518 or 1519)

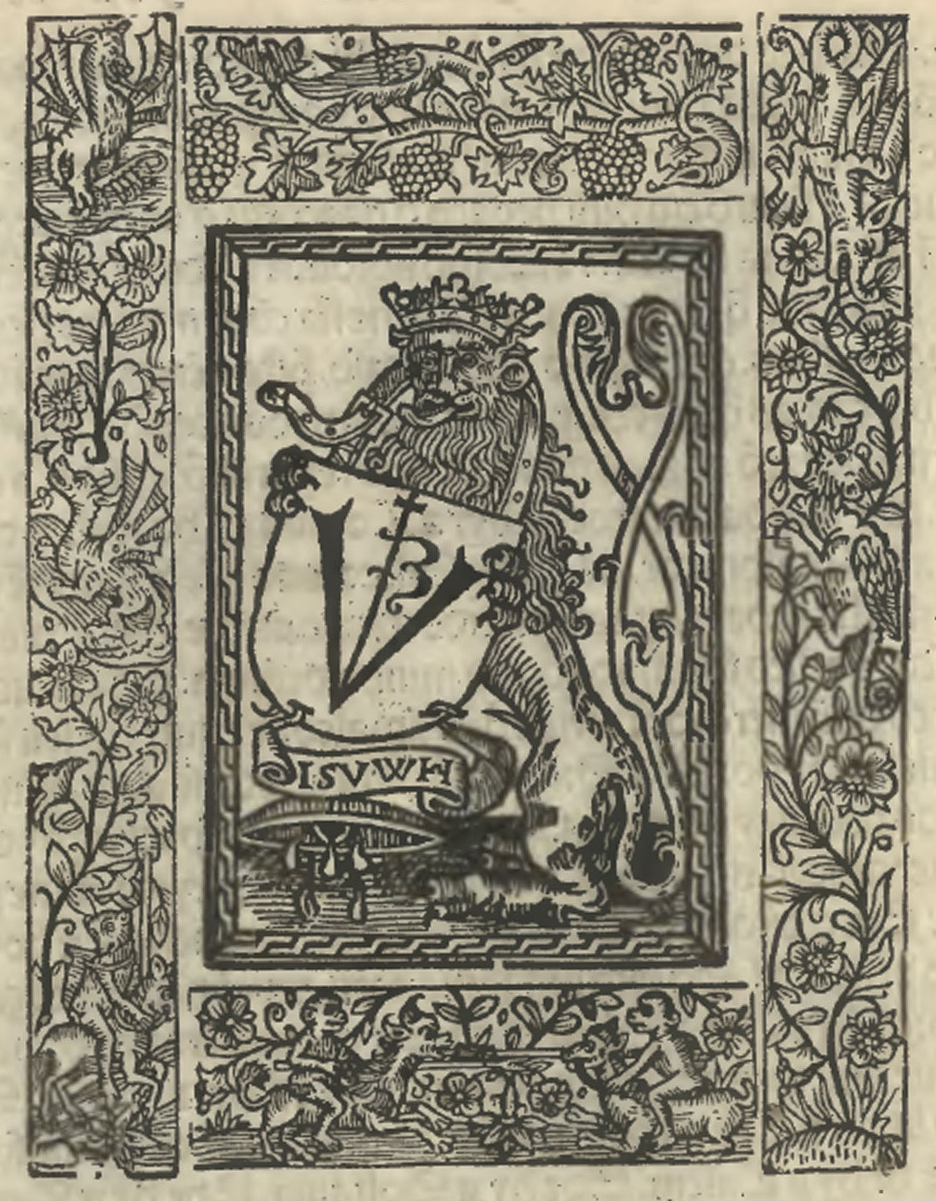
Printer's mark of Valentim Fernandes

Valentim Fernandes (died 1518 or 1519) was a printer who lived in Portugal. An ethnic German originally from Moravia, he moved to Lisbon, Portugal in 1495 where he lived and worked for 23 years, he was a writer and a translator of various classical texts. He printed on the orders of Leonor of Viseu and worked on the book Vita Christi.

His 1506-1507 Descripcam described how camel caravans carried Saharan salt from Oualata to Timbuktu, and then onto Djenne. There the salt was exchanged with the Soninke Wangara for gold.

He died in Lisbon in 1518 or 1519.

He worked with different intellectuals and artists, including Albrecht Dürer, Hieronymus Münzer and Mathias Ringmann (better known as Philesius Vogesigena who was a translator).

== See also ==
- Valentim Fernandes manuscript (Descripcam)
