= Valentim Fernandes manuscript =

The Valentim Fernandes manuscript (Manuscrito Valentim Fernandes), also known as Relation of Diogo Gomes (Relação de Diogo Gomes) and Descripcam is a manuscript that discusses the beginning of Portuguese sea navigation. Written in Latin, it is divided into three parts:

- "De prima inuentione Guinee"
- "De insulis primo inventis in mare Occidentis"
- "De inventione insularum de Açores" (now as Azuris in Latin)

== History ==
The manuscript was written in around 1506 or 1507, and is attributed to Diogo Gomes, who made the first notes on the Henrican navigations and discovered the Cape Verde Islands.

The codex was written by J. A. Schmeller in 1847 at the Munich National Library.

The text was studied by the German Conrad Peutinger or the Portuguese Damião de Góis during the 16th century. It was notable in that it clearly described the deliberately scientific and commercials goals of Henry the Navigator on the exploration.

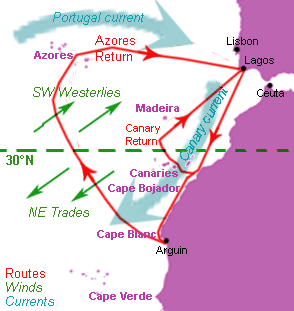
Henrican navigation routes

Henry the Navigator sent his caravels and headed to new lands (ad quaerendas terras). Its ships headed into the western ocean and into what was terra firma, outside the limits of Ptolemy (ultra descriptionem Tolomei, now as ultra descriptionem Ptolemaeus). Its information on naval commerce between Tunis and Timbuktu and the Gambia helped inspire exploration of the West African coast. It used maps and quadrants. Henry, in the time of Gomes' first voyage, corresponded with a merchant from Oran who had information about the exploration of The Gambia. In 1445, before the discovery of Senegal and Cape Verde, he had collected information on the way to Timbuktu.

Gomes contacted discovered peoples, engaging them in diplomatic relations and commerce while evangelizing the Christian faith. After reaching Rio Grande on the other side of Cape Verde, strong sea currents changed its route and its crew feared that they would reach the end of the ocean, and headed for the Gambia. They headed up the river, reaching the city of Kantor (or Cantor). They did business in Kukia (the upper source of the Niger River), the center of the West African gold trade. They learned about visits by merchants and caravans from Tunis, Fez and Cairo and the lands of Islam. It described how camel caravans carried Saharan salt from Oualata to Timbuktu, and then onto Djenne. There the salt was exchanged with the Soninke Wangara for gold.

A final part, contains the only coeval account of the rediscovery of the Azores by the Portuguese under the service of Henry the Navigator.

Another African voyage that was known in 1462, came two years after the death of Henry the Navigator (some sources state that he died in 1460), when the island of Cape Verde was rediscovered. Gomes, like his predecessor claimed to have named it. The narrative has a reference to the final illness of Henry the Navigator, as well as discussing his life, realizations and objectives. It discussed what seemed to be his first explorations. Under the command of João de Trasto, he reached Grand Canary in 1415.

The original chronicle namely Codex Hisp. 27 is held in the Bavarian State Library in Munich. The original Latin was published by Johann Andreas Schmeller titled Uber Valentim Fernandez Alembico in Abhandlungen den philosoph.-philolog Kl. der bayerisch. Akademie der Wissenschaften, vol. IV., part III. (Munich, 1847);
