= Praia do Almoxarife =

- Civil parish
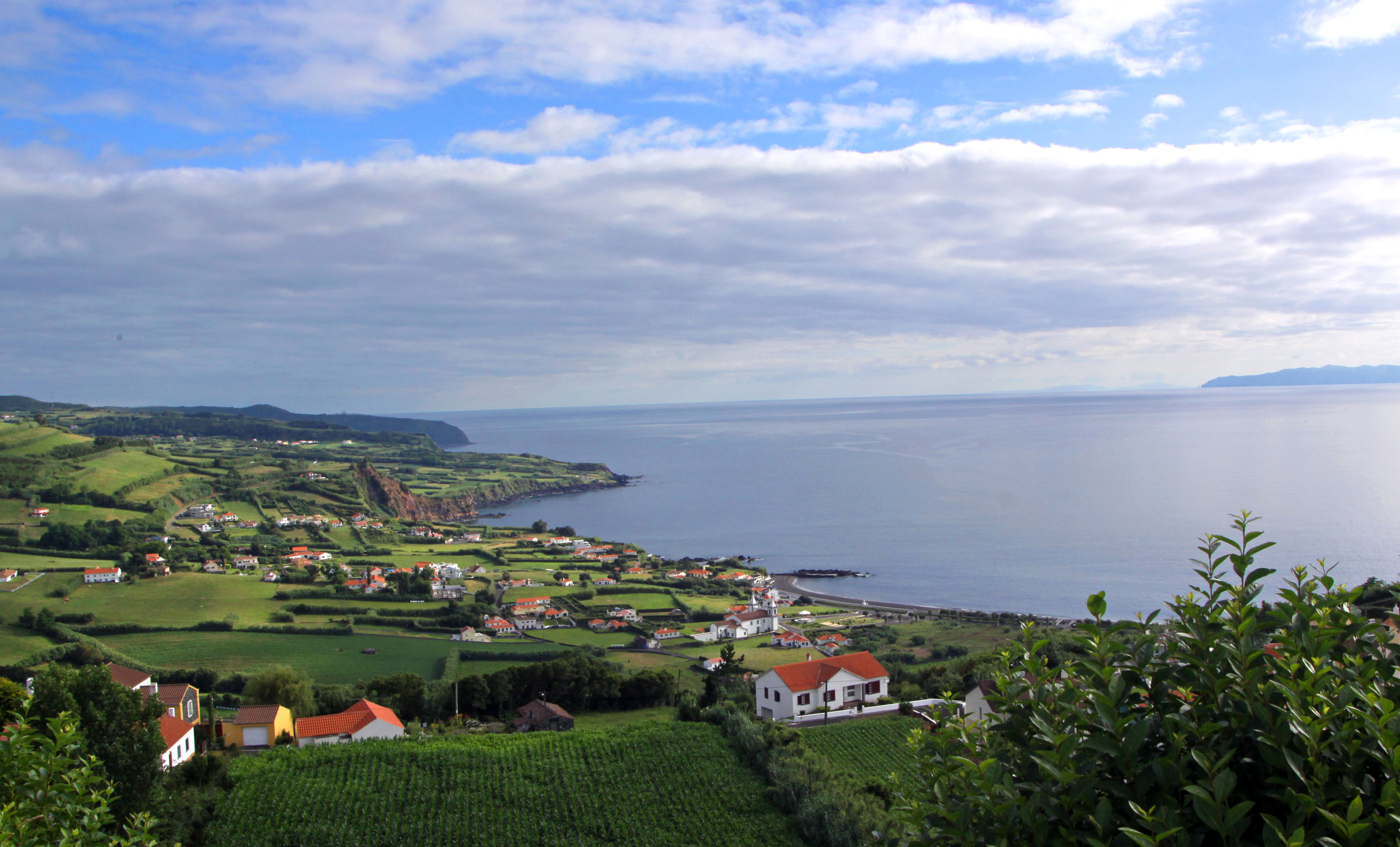
- The area of Facho, overlooking the main village of Praia do Almoxarife, as seen from the escarpment of Espalamaca

- Location of the civil parish of Praia do Almoxarife within the municipality of Horta
- Coordinates: 38°33′38″N 28°37′27″W
- Country: Portugal
- Auton. region: Azores
- Island: Faial
- Municipality: Horta
- Established: Settlement: c.1466

Area
  - Total: 9.20 km^{2} (3.55 sq mi)
- Elevation: 138 m (453 ft)

Population (2011)
  - Total: 834
  - Density: 90.7/km^{2} (235/sq mi)
- Time zone: UTC−01:00 (AZOT)
  - Summer (DST): UTC+00:00 (AZOST)
- Postal code: 9900-451
- Area code: 292
- Patron: Nossa Senhora da Graça

Praia do Almoxarife (pronounced [ˈpɾaj.ɐ du aɫ.mo.ʃɐ.ˈɾi.fɨ]) is a freguesia ("civil parish") in the municipality (concelho) of Horta, of the Portuguese archipelago of the Azores. The population in 2011 was 834, in an area of 9.20 km^{2}. Although it was the beachhead of early settlement on the island, its population has not grown significantly since it was settled. It has become an important summer destination and tourist center for its long black sand beach.

== History ==
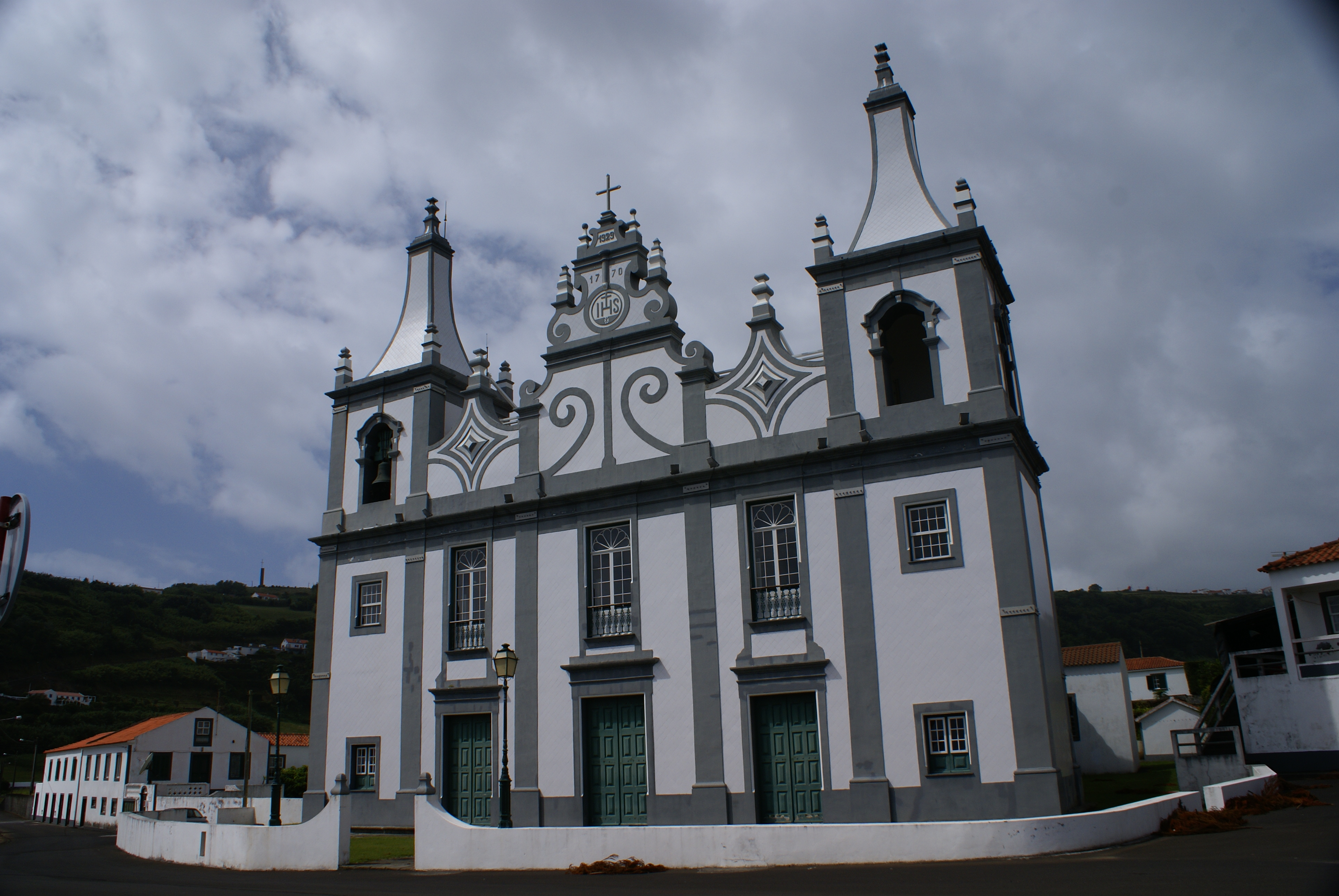
The front facade of the Church of Nossa Senhora da Graça

Praia was originally a beachhead of settlement on Faial, first used by as a beachhead for explorers, and then by new colonists coming to settle the central group of the Azores. In 1466, Josse van Huerter and his Flemish compatriots landed on the beach in a misguided hope of discovery precious metals (in particular tin and silver). Their settlement abridged the Lomba dos Frades, where they stayed for about a year. There was a falling out between Huerter and his crew, and he narrowly escaped the island with his life. He later returned in 1466-67, with a commission from the Duchess of Burgundy to settle and populate the islands in the name of the crown of Portugal. Quickly, he discovered that the area's limitations continued, and he abandoned this settlement in favour of the adjacent valley, later known as the Vale dos Flamengos (Valley of the Flemings); some island chroniclers blamed the abandon of Praia on the lack of a potable water source.

Meanwhile, other settlers continued to occupy this region, where a small settlement persisted through the decades. Praia, likely, received its current toponymy (based in Moorish or Islamic origin) for being the point of settlement for the administrator of lands or royal treasurer on the island; almoxarife means treasurer, a term now in disuse in Portugal, but which refers to an agent responsible for guarding, distributing, inventorying goods or supplies.

On 12 September 1597, English privateers sacked and burned down the buildings in the parish.

By 1643, friar Diogo das Chagas, noted that the parish consisted of 305 inhabitants dispersed within the valley.

On 1 February 1718, many residents gathered at the Casa da Câmara (Municipal House), in Horta, following the catastrophic eruption on the island of Pico, which disturbed the parishes of Santa Luzia and Bandeiras. From here, the local residents travelled in procession to the Church of Nossa Senhora da Conceição (Our Lady of the Conception), with an image of Senhor Santo Cristo, which was met by another group of faithful carrying a statue of the Virgin Mary. At the church the groups prayed for "redemption and mercy". During the course of their benedictions, the community made a pledge to continue to celebrate masses of penance, devotion and thanksgiving on future anniversaries in the name of Senhor Santo Cristo; as they pledged "for every year as long as the earth existed...at the municipality's expense...with all officials...assisted by all communities, to be made at your church of Praia...at all expense necessary".

Following the beginning of the First Portuguese Republic until 1926, owing to an anti-religious secularism in the political administration in Portugal (and the Azores), the masses of thanksgiving were discontinued. After the 1926 Horta earthquake which destroyed 204 houses out of 220 in Praia do Almoxarife, a new petition by citizens, to renew the tradition, was forwarded to the Ministério do Interior (Ministry of the Interior), where the minister authorized the chief of the district to renew the tradition.

== Geography ==
Nestled between Lomba da Espalamaca and Lomba dos Frades, the parish is primarily an agricultural settlement. Bisected by the eastern Regional Road E.R.1-1ª, the community is divided to an eastern beach community, and western pastureland that extends westerly to the island's caldera. The parish contains the localities Caminho do Meio, Canada dos Cedros, Facho, Fenandega, Ladeira da Praia, Lomba, Praia, Ramada and Rocha Vermelha.

== Sights and architecture ==
Close to Largo Coronel Silva Leal, the centre of the municipality, several old houses built in the traditional style of the island can be seen in the small lanes of Rua da Igreja and Rua Padre António Cândido Avelar.

Igreja de Nossa Senhora da Graça, the comparatively large parish church, was mentioned in a document in 1568 for the first time. Having been burnt by privateers in 1597 it was rebuilt in a baroque style in 1758 with two side chapels and two tall towers. The church was severely damaged by an earthquake on 9 July 1998 and repaired afterwards.

A small park with a pavilion was laid out in front of the church. Opposite the church a small Holy Spirit Chapel was built, Império da Trindade. The years 1873 and 1943 were painted onto the façade, 1873 referring to the construction and 1943 referring to the renovation of the chapel.

== Economy ==
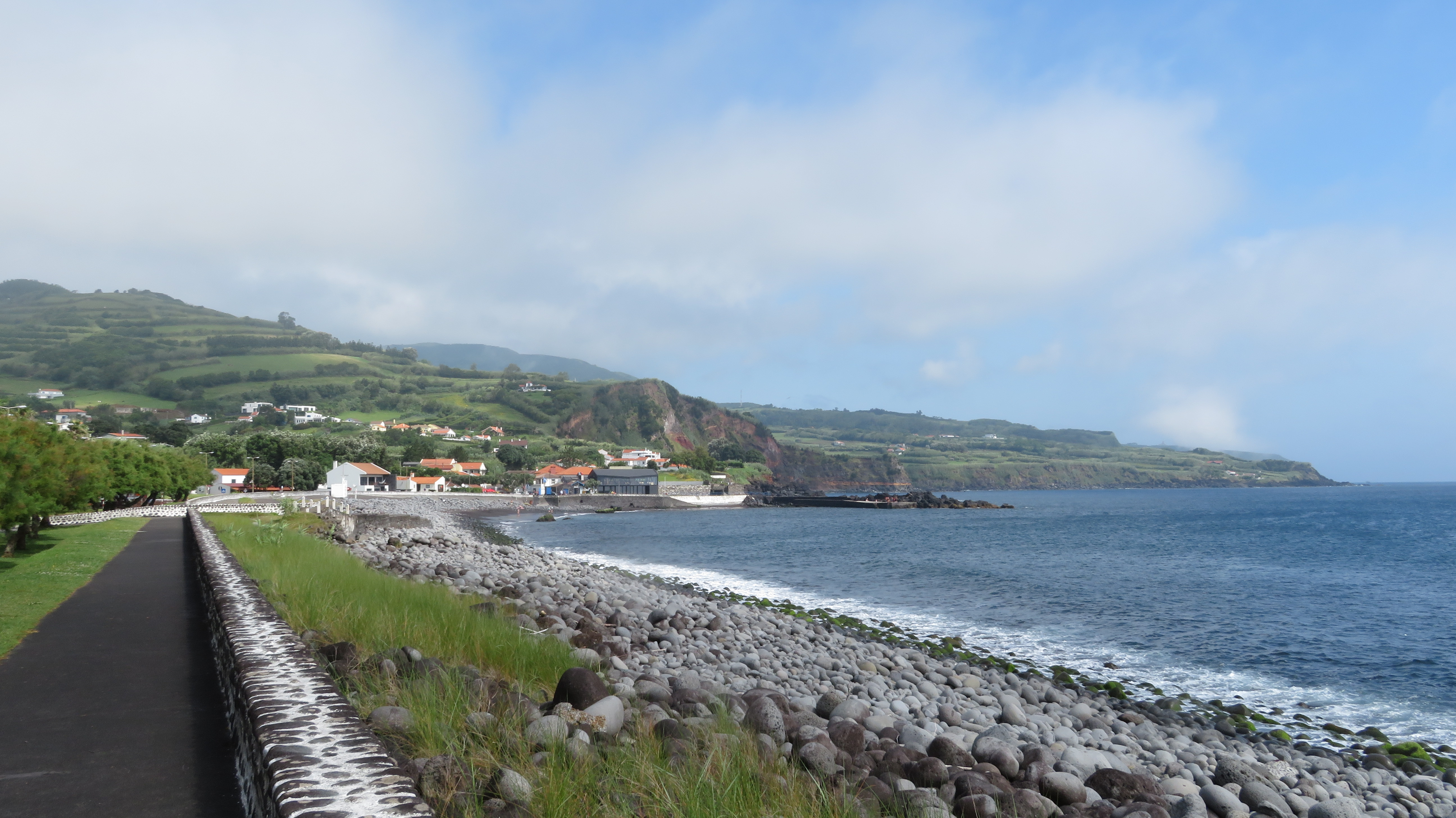
Beach of Praia do Amoxarife

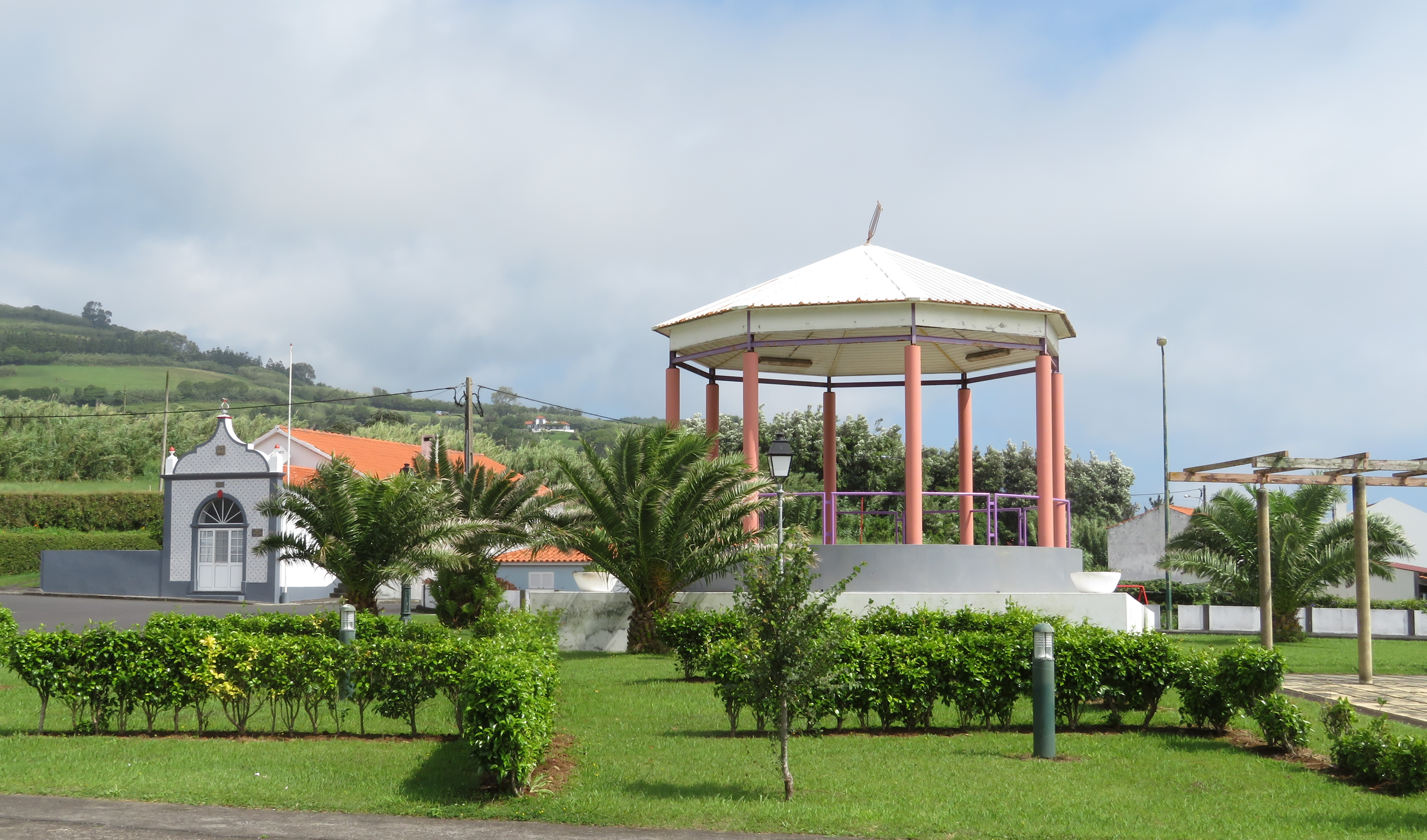
Public park and Império da Trindade

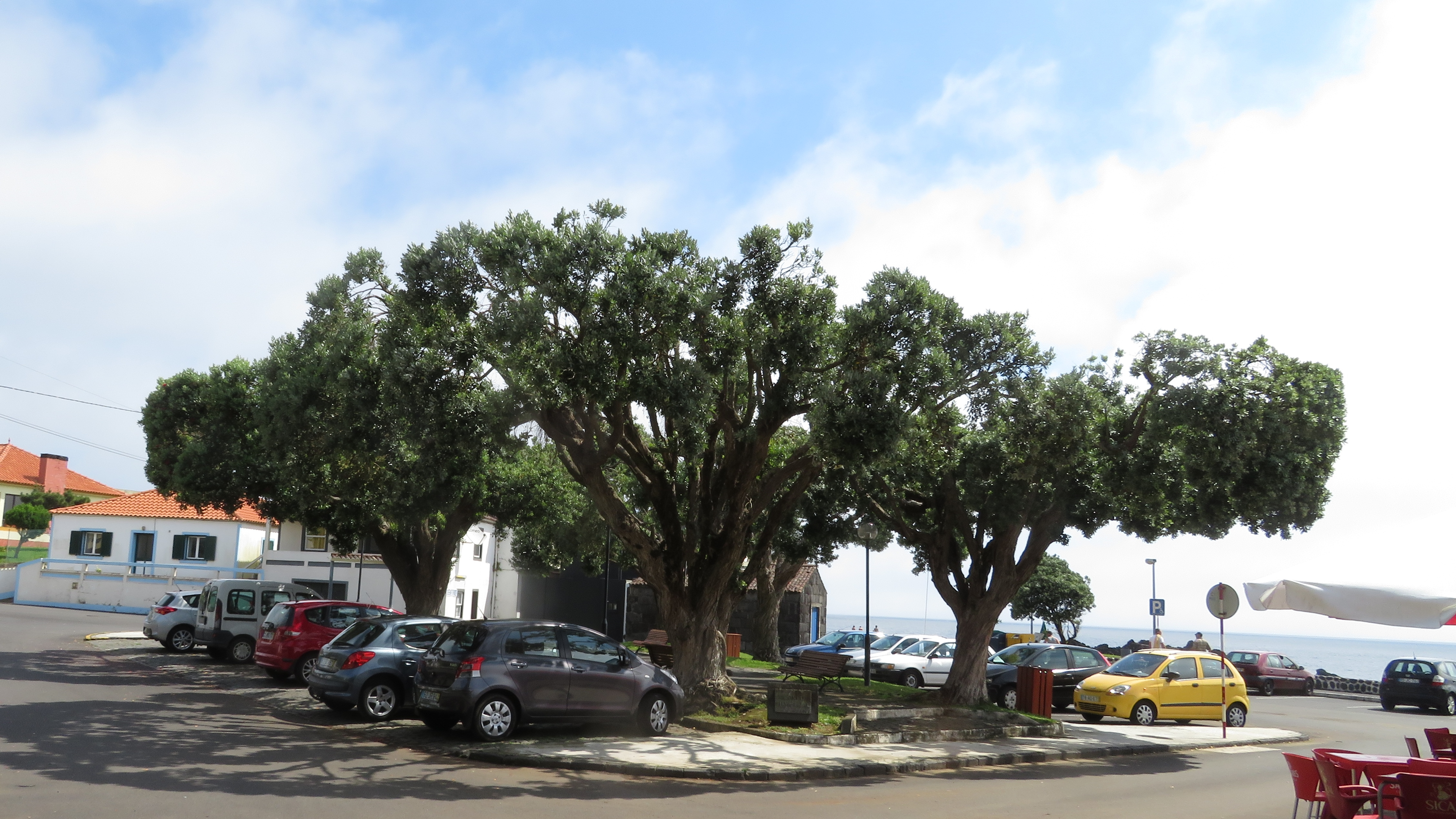
Central square Largo Coronel Silva Leal

Due to its relative proximity to Horta, the community has become a surrogate for tourist and summer vacationers due to its beach. This has steadily become an important primary economic resource, overtaking the traditional agriculture and dairy production, which is primarily concentrated to the west of the Regional Road. There is a certain touristic infrastructure around "Largo Coronel Silva Leal" the central square of Praia do Almoxarife.
