= Ribeirinha (Horta) =

- Civil parish
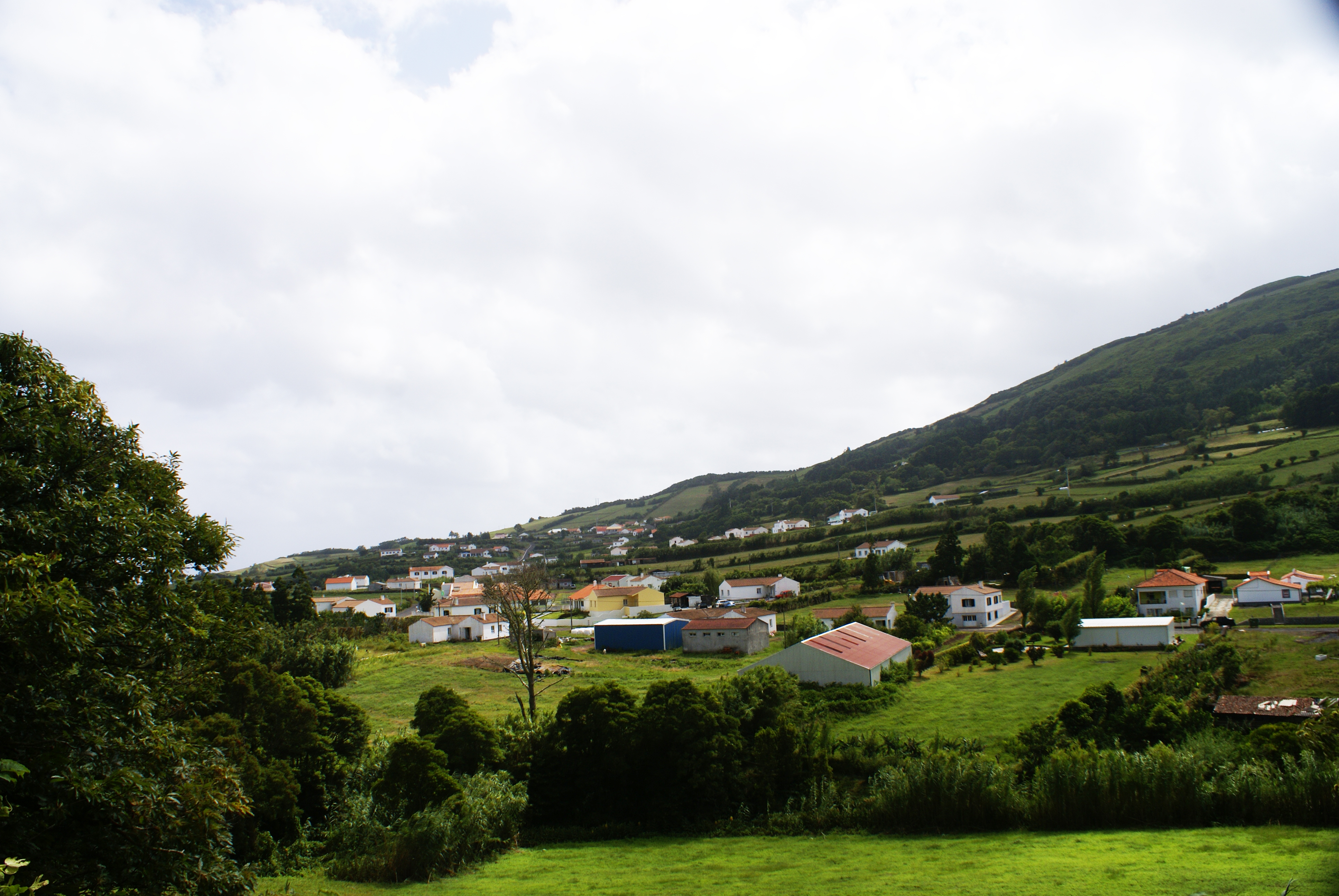
- A partial view of the main residential enclave of Ribeirinha, along the northern slope of the Pedro Miguel Graben

- Location of the civil parish of Ribeirinha within the municipality of Horta
- Coordinates: 38°35′25″N 28°36′48″W
- Country: Portugal
- Auton. region: Azores
- Island: Faial
- Municipality: Horta
- Established: Settlement: fl.1600 Parish: fl.1643

Area
  - Total: 12.26 km^{2} (4.73 sq mi)
- Elevation: 114 m (374 ft)

Population (2011)
  - Total: 427
  - Density: 34.8/km^{2} (90.2/sq mi)
- Time zone: UTC−01:00 (AZOT)
  - Summer (DST): UTC+00:00 (AZOST)
- Postal code: 9900-491
- Area code: (+351) 292 XX XX XX
- Patron: São Mateus da Ribeirinha
- Website: http://www.jf-ribeirinha.com/

Ribeirinha is a freguesia ("civil parish") in the municipality of Horta in the Portuguese archipelago of the Azores. The population in 2011 was 427, in an area of 12.26 km^{2}. It contains the localities Canadinha, Chã da Cruz, Espalhafatos, Lomba dos Espalhafatos and Rua da Igreja.

== History ==
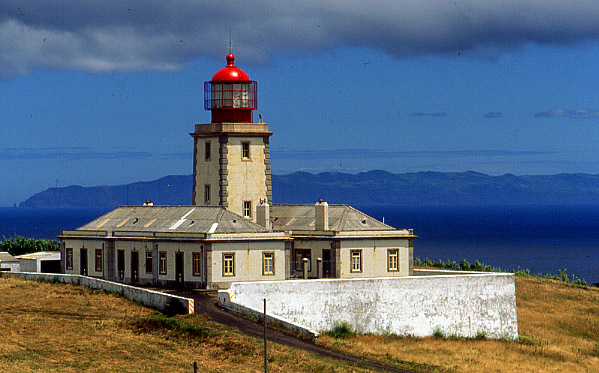
The Ribeirinha Lighthouse as it looked prior to the events of 9 July 1998

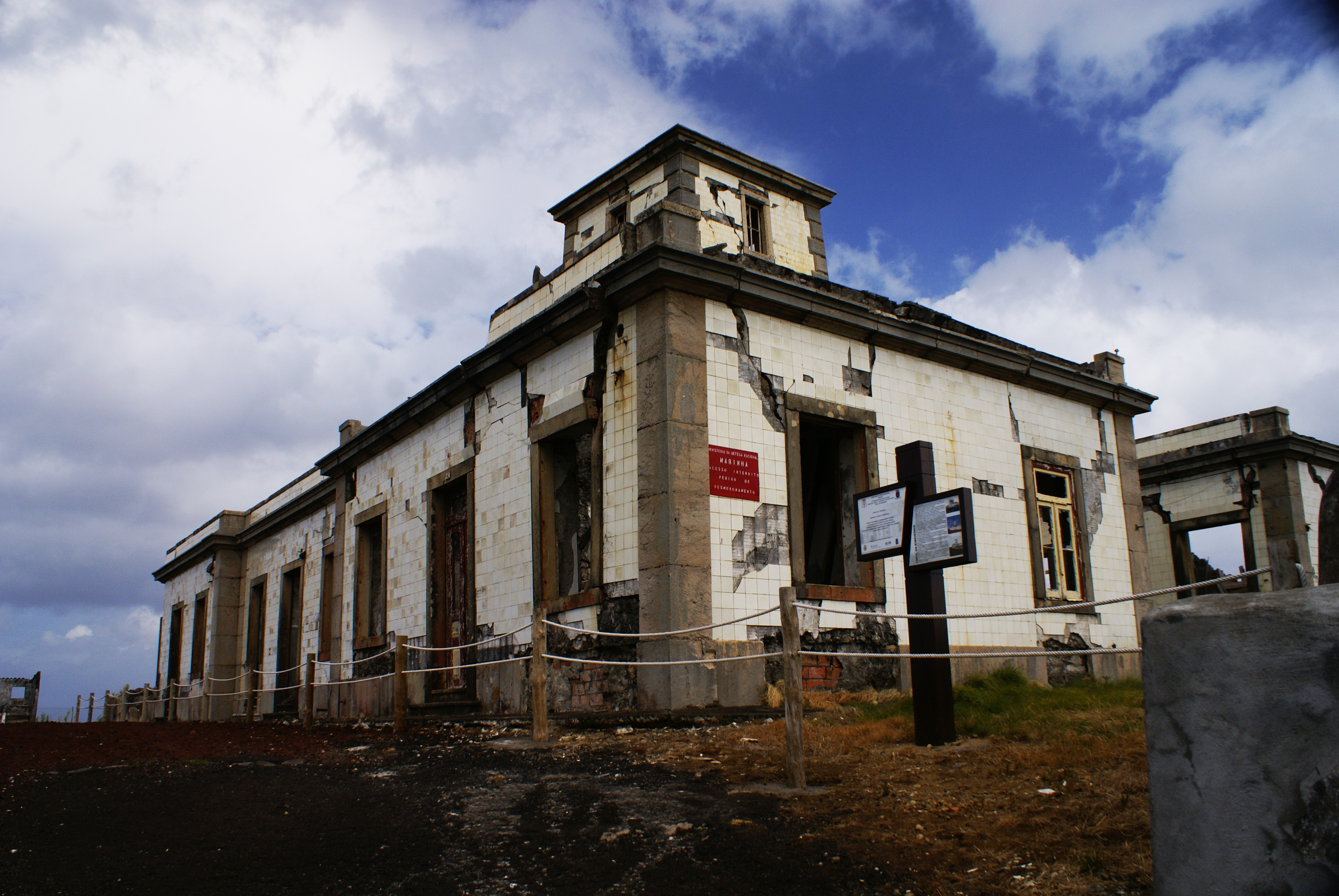
The ruins of the Ribeirinha Lighthouse after the 1998 earthquake that affected many of the parishes of Faial

The parish receives its name from the small river and valley that was occupied during the period of settlement. Riberinha, in Portuguese, literally means small "ribeira", or small river-valley owing to its location. New settlers constructed their village two kilometers from the coast, due to several incursions by pirates. This distance allowed the inhabitants to monitor the coast and plan traps for the invaders. One area, Poceirão dos Mouros, refers to one of these traps where the pirates (the Moors of the Canal, as they were known) were ensnared.

In 1643, as recounted by friar Diogo das Chagas, the parish consisted of 71 homes and 254 inhabitants. A quarter of a century later, the Church of São Mateus da Ribeirinha was constructed, and would remain the center of religious life in the parish until the violent earthquake of July 9, 1998.

One of the more colorful stories from Faial pertains to the end of the Iberian Union, when (in 1640) Spanish residents of Salão were expelled from their homes by their neighbors in Cedros. Many escaped by way of their frontier with Ribeirinha bringing with them their clothes and possessions, which were lost during the violent events. The area where their clothing was tossed in the ensuing scuffle was given the name "Espalhafatos", which means "scattered suits", referring to the ornamented clothing found scattered along the route.

On May 21, 1932, a giant hydroplane, the Dornier Wall (DO-X) with twelve motors, on a trip to Vigo, Spain made port in front of the community.

Generally, the population of this region has shown a dramatic decrease between 1890 (1,112), 1940 (1,031) and the last census 2001 (439). This primarily the consequences of immigration, economic upheavals and a shift from agricultural production (and its lower standard of living).

Overlooking the canal, the Ribeirinha lighthouse was one of the more important landmarks on the island. It was mentioned in many works of the Portuguese writer Vitorino Nemésio, who wrote the ex-libris of the lighthouse in his work Mau Tempo no Canal. The lighthouse is a square form, covered in white azulejo (tiles); a rectangular base, featuring a central tower. Construction began during the month of May, 1915m and inaugurated in the winter of 1919 (November 1). Its optic (made from crystal) and lantern (partly red) distinguish it as a unique World Heritage artifact. Following the earthquake of 1998, the building was abandoned due to major cracks and deterioration of the internal structure. Following the earthquake, which was centered 5 km off the coast of Ponta da Ribeirinha, the lighthouse was left in ruins. A preemptive demolition of the building in 2001 was abandoned following a campaign of the Liga dos Amigos do Farol (the League of Friends of the Lighthouse). Their objective to preserve and reconstruct the lighthouse has not yet materialized. Meanwhile, the older equipment has been placed in the possession of the Casa do Povo da Ribeirinha.

== Geography ==
=== Physical geography ===
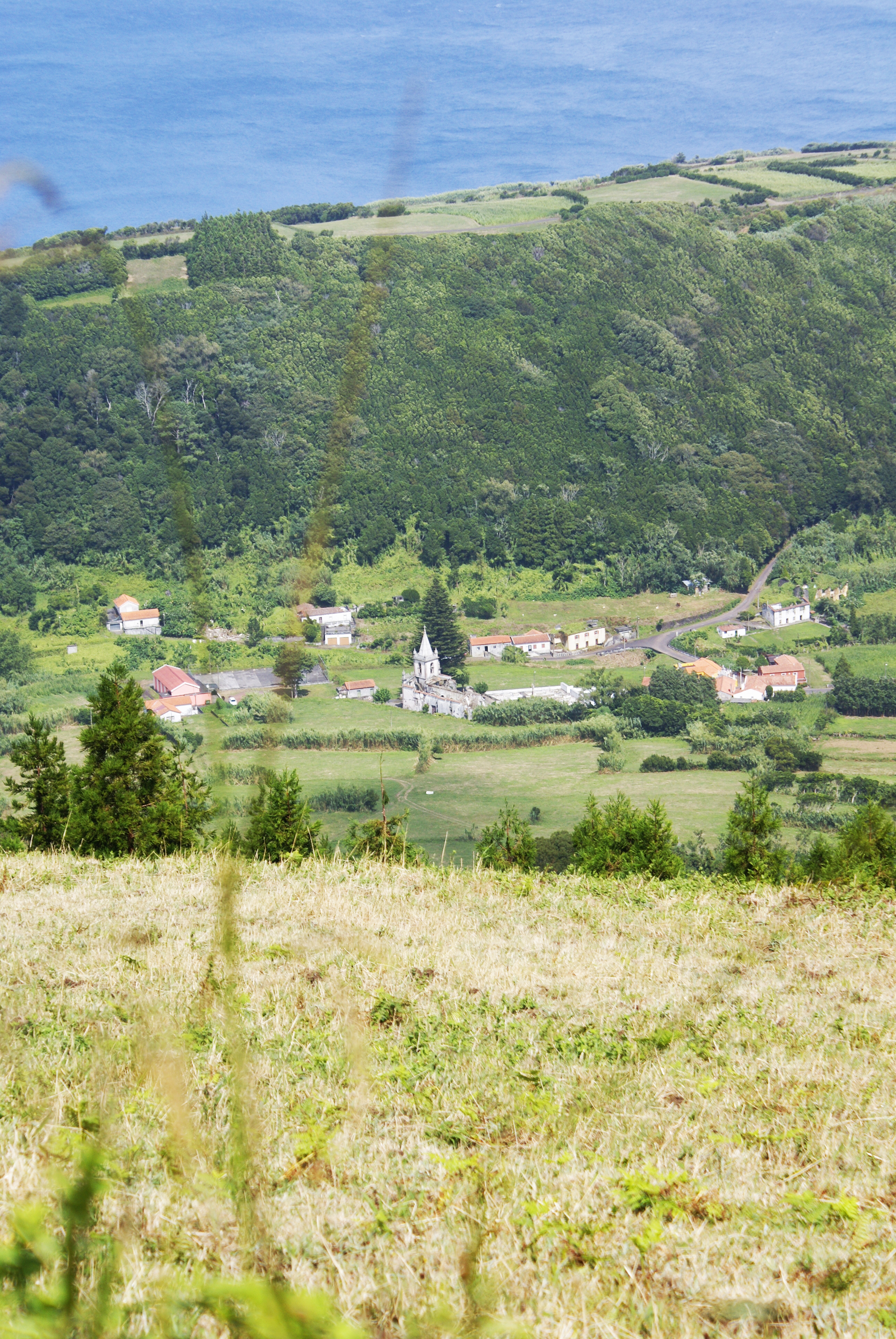
A partial view of the old destroyed Church of Ribeirinha in the river-valley

Ribeirinha lies within two morphological formations, the ancient Ribeirinha Volcanic Complex, and the more recent Pedro Miguel Graben structure. The ancient Ribeirinha Volcanic Complex includes lava flows intermixed with heavily altered pyroclastic deposits and, in the western part of the parish, covered in pumice and ash from more recent volcanic events produced by the central volcano. Although there exist no volcanic structures, the region is vulnerable to the products from any central eruption on the island and peaks, such as Tambroso.

The parish is crossed by important geological faults: Chã da Crus Fault (reactivated during the 9 July 1998 earthquake), the Ribeirinha-Espalhaftos Fault and the Carapeto Fault oriented along a north-northwest to south-southeast alignment. Gaspar et al. (1998) consider the possibility of a structural fault, aligned northeast to southwest coincident with the Ribeirinha-Espalhafatos Fault that occurred during the 1998 earthquake.

=== Human geography ===
The community itself is divided into areas located within the Ribeirinha river-valley, and portions that are situated on several mountains and escarpments overlooking the same: Ribeirinha and Espalhafatos. Administratively, Riberinha is divided by borders along Lomba Grande (543 metres) and Lomba da Ribeira (209 metres) oriented west to east (both covered with many endemic species of plants, shrubs and trees natural to the Azores). Towards the interior, the plateau Trás-da-Serra is a feature of volcanic origins, as well as a protected countryside comprising many farmlands and diverse natural views.

The sheltered port of Boca da Ribeira is one of the oldest fishing ports found in the northernmost point of the Faial Channel.

On 22 March 2012, a private day centre for seniors was inaugurated, to support a maximum of 30 people in the community of Espalhafatos, an area with access to both northern and eastern residents. Built in order to meet the local needs and remove seniors' dependency, the building was opened by Optimus Senium, a local company that took advantage of a vacated restaurant in order to provide meals, transport of the elderly, care and comfort, medical support, nursing and physiotherapeutic care, as well as stimulating activities of a socio-cultural and psycho-social nature.

== Architecture ==
Through successive use and re-use Ribeirinha has maintained a small group of architecturally significant buildings. The effects from earthquakes and inundation along the Riberia da Ribeirinha has made a historical catalogue of these structures difficult.

=== Civic ===
- Lighthouse of Ribeirinha (Portuguese: Farol da Ribeirinha), a third-order coastal lighthouse, destroyed and now in ruins after the 1980 Azores Islands earthquake;

=== Religious ===
- Church of São Mateus (Portuguese: Igreja Paroquial da Riberinha/Igreja de São Mateus), another historical church destroyed during the 1980 earthquake; most of the eastern facade has been carved away, revealing the complete interior of the temple;
- Império of the Holy Spirit (Portuguese: Império do Espírito Santo da Ribeirinha/Império Amarelo), or Yellow Império, is an elevated two-storey império used in the celebrations of the Cult of the Holy Spirit annually, and located alongside the Ribeira da Ribeirinha, not far from the cemetery and church.
