= List of freguesias of Portugal: H =

The freguesias (civil parishes) of Portugal are listed in by municipality according to the following format:

- concelho
  - freguesias

== Horta (Azores) ==
- Angústias (Horta)
- Capelo
- Castelo Branco
- Cedros
- Conceição
- Feteira
- Flamengos
- Matriz (Horta)
- Pedro Miguel
- Praia do Almoxarife
- Praia do Norte
- Ribeirinha
- Salão
