= Feteira =

Feteira may refer to:

- Feteira (Angra do Heroísmo), a parish in the district of Angra do Heroísmo, Azores
- Feteira (Horta), a parish in the municipality of Horta, Azores
