= Horta Airport =

Horta Airport Aeroporto Internacional da Horta

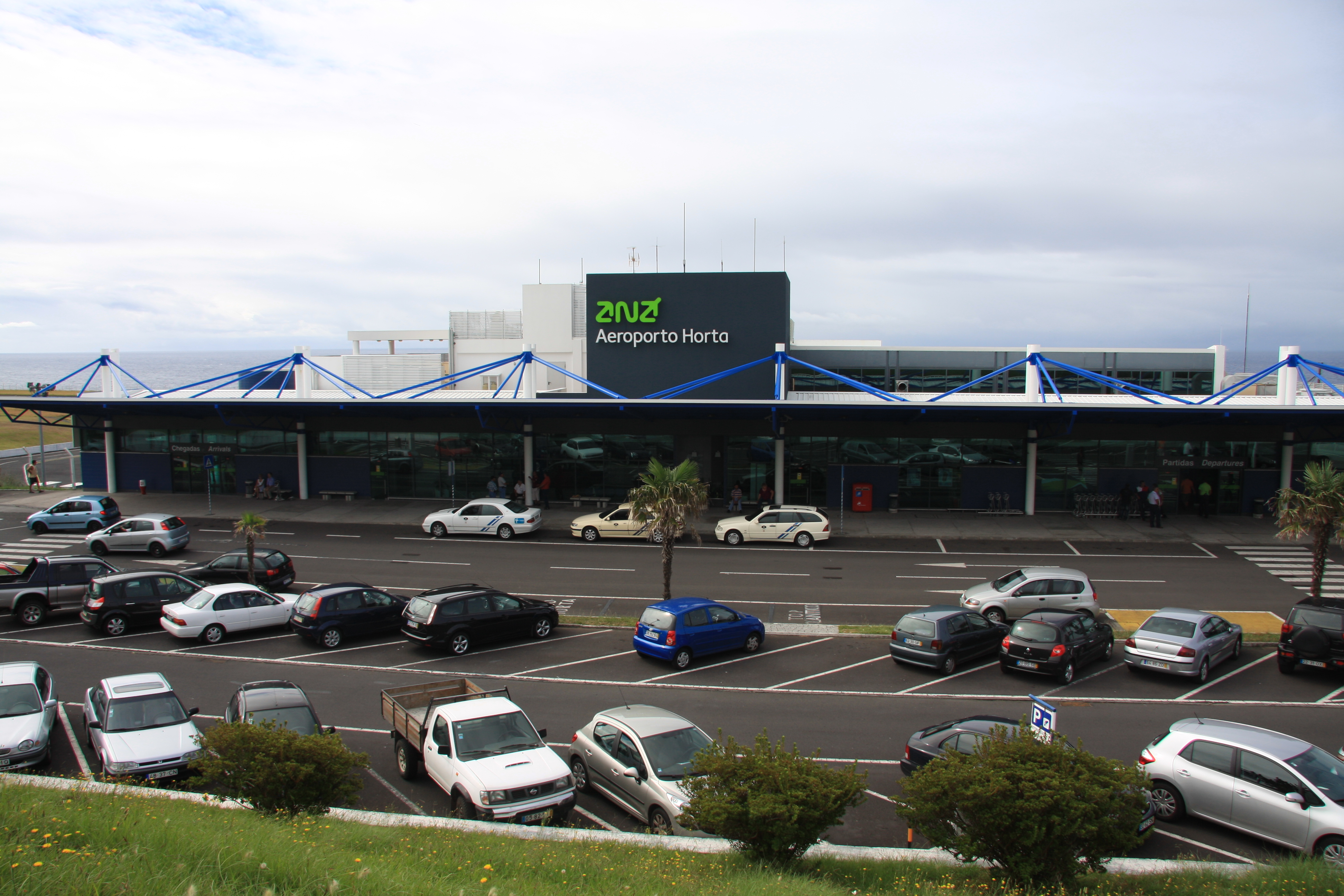
- IATA: HOR; ICAO: LPHR; WMO: 08505

Summary
- Airport type: Public
- Owner: Government of Portugal
- Operator: ANA Aeroportos de Portugal
- Serves: Horta
- Location: Castelo Branco, Faial
- Elevation AMSL: 118 ft (36 m)
- Coordinates: 38°31′12″N 028°42′59″W
- Website: https://www.aeroportohorta.pt/pt/hor/home

Map
- Location in the Azores

Runways
| Direction | Length | | Surface |
| Direction | m | ft | Surface |
|---|---|---|---|
| 10/28 | 1,595 | 5,233 | Asphalt |

Statistics (2018)
- Passengers: 247,000
- Passengers change 17-18: ▲0.4%
- Movements: 4,500
- Movements change 17-18: ▼0.6%
- Sources: Portuguese AIP; Airport Director: João Resendes Nunes Corvelo

Horta Airport (IATA: HOR, ICAO: LPHR) is an airport located in the parish of Castelo Branco, 9.5 km (5.9 mi) southwest of the center of Horta, on Faial Island in the archipelago of the Azores. The airport was remodeled and reinaugurated in December 2001, in order to serve the islands of the Central Group (Terceira, Graciosa, São Jorge, Pico and Faial), as well as expanded to support domestic connectivity to Lisbon.

It is an important economic tool in the economy of the region, and a vital connection to the smaller aerodromes in the outlying islands. Currently, there are plans to expand the runways by 275 m (902 ft), and night time air flight services have been approved.

== History ==
The airport at Horta was inaugurated on 24 August 1971 by then President Almirante Américo Tomás. On 5 July 1985, TAP Air Portugal initiated direct flights between Horta and Lisbon: the first aircraft was a Boeing 737 named Ponta Delgada.

Along with the airports in Lisbon, Porto, Faro, Flores, Santa Maria, Ponta Delgada and Beja, the airport's concessions to provide support to civil aviation was conceded to ANA Aeroportos de Portugal on 18 December 1998, under provisions of decree 404/98. With this concession, ANA was also provided to the planning, development and construction of future infrastructures.

Following the 2001 renovation, the airport was designated an international airport. Although a seasonal pattern of activity and airline movements occur at this airport, there has been a steady increase in the passenger numbers and cargo transited at Horta Airport.

Between the months of October and November 2009, the runway grooving was undertaken by the company Proysesa.

On the afternoon of 28 July 2011, a refurbished control tower was inaugurated, which permitted the airport to oversee the Central Group, as well as the Western Group of islands (Flores and Corvo). A Wide Area Multilateration (WAM) system was installed in the expanded tower, allowing the supervision of aviation within the airspace, as well as monitoring approaching aircraft to the islands of Pico, São Jorge and Graciosa, in addition to allowing a larger workspace for air traffic controllers. During the inauguration, the administration of the airport also identified plans to install satellite technology that would allow aircraft to land in instances of low cloud cover, or where visibility was poor or non-existent. The installation of these new systems would occur at the two ends of the runway in 2012.

In 2012, the contamination of the gasoline tanks at Horta airport resulted in a deviation from normal flight operations, resulting in flights being refueled on other islands (primarily Lajes Field on Terceira). The contamination of the jet fuel, resulted in delays between Lisbon and Horta, where flights would have to include a stopover on Terceira. A similar situation in 2009, lasting for 20 days resulted in redirected flights to Ponta Delgada (São Miguel) and Vila do Porto (Santa Maria).

== Terminal ==
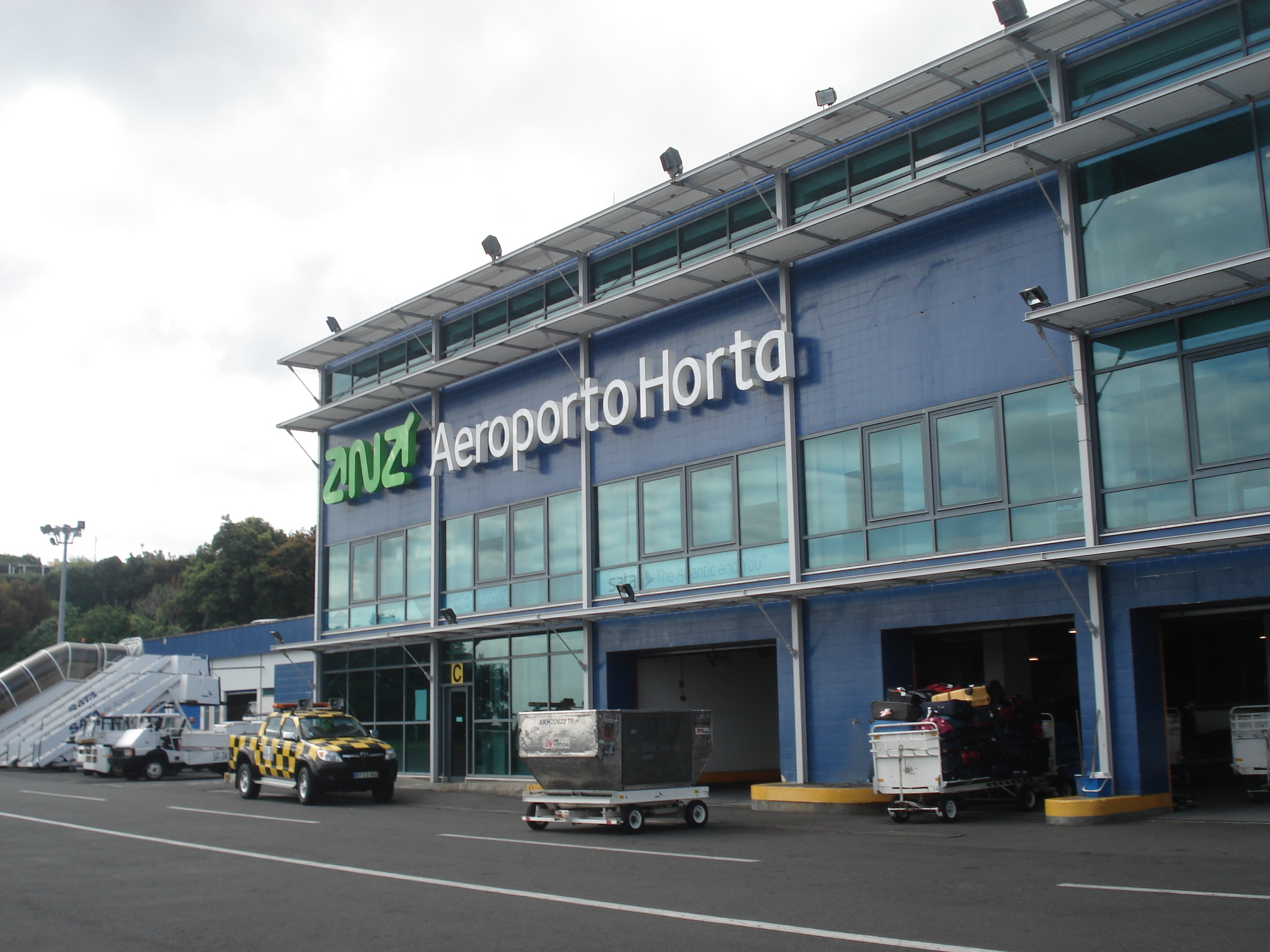
The three-story terminal building, with departures/arrivals on the runway-level, checkin on the street-level and first-floor cafe/lounge

The three-story terminal building is divided operationally, with departures and arrivals on the same floor (street-level), cafe and lounge on the first floor and runway-level departures lounge and logistics. The street-level departures and arrivals concourses are situated on opposite ends of the terminal; flight check-ins, baggage check and oversize security in the western wing, while in the east is the enclosed arrivals lounge with one baggage carousal, and car rental services. The runway-level departures lounge and arrivals is connected directly to the street-level by staircase and escalators respectively.

The first-floor cafe/lounge is marked by an exterior observation deck, with a view of the runway, control tower and the distant island of Pico.

== Airlines and destinations ==
The following airlines operate regular scheduled and charter flights at Horta Airport:

| Airlines | Destinations |
|---|---|
| Azores Airlines | Lisbon |
| SATA Air Açores | Corvo, Flores, Ponta Delgada, Terceira |

== See also ==
- Aviation in the Azores
