= Maria Branco =

Azorean widwife (1842-1887)

- Born: 15 / 03 / 1842; Horta, Faial, Azores
- Died: 03 / 11 / 1887; Horta, Faial, Azores
- Occupation: Midwife
- Parent(s): Manuel and Josefa Branco

Maria Branco (15 March 1842, Horta, Faial, Azores – 3 November 1887, Horta, Faial, Azores), was an Azorean woman who became the most well-known midwife of the Dabney family during their stay in Horta, Faial, Azores, which was a colony of Portugal. Her expertise was in difficult birth cases.

== Biography ==
Ever since her grandparents, the Branco family worked for the estate of the North American entrepreneur and United States Consul General in the Azores, John Bass Dabney, established in the island since 1808.

Maria's father, Manuel Branco, was a longshoreman who spent his days loading crates of oranges, while her mother, Josefa Branco, worked as a housemaid at The Cedars mansion. This provided Maria with a privileged childhood for her social status, as she was given the chance of spending time with the family's children.

Instead of following in her mother footsteps as a maid, she started from a young age to attend the neighborhood births. Having assisted various types of labors, she quickly became an expert at solving complex cases. She stood out for her ability to keep mother and children healthy.

== See also ==
- Midwife
- Horta
- Faial
- Azores
