= Castelo Branco (Horta) =

- Civil parish
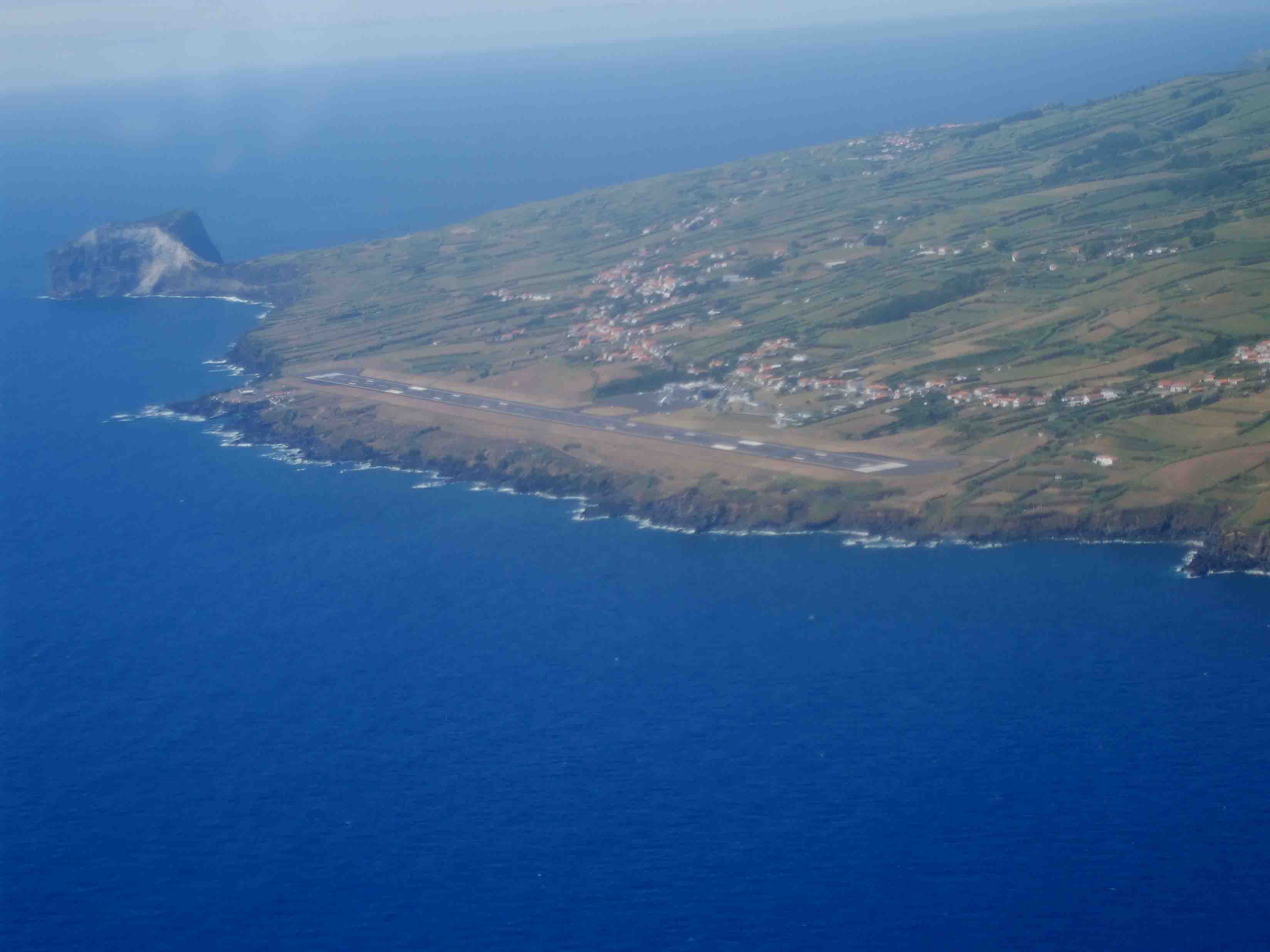
- The International Airport in Castelo Branco and view of the urbanized settlement

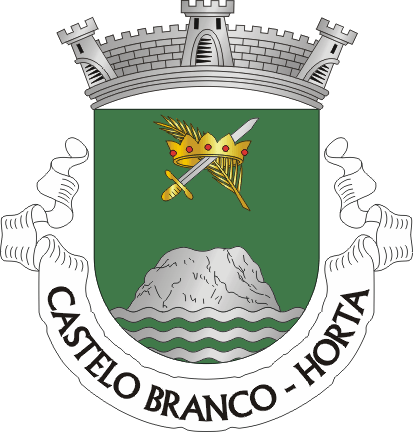
- Coat of arms

- Location of the civil parish of Castelo Branco within the municipality of Horta
- Coordinates: 38°32′7″N 28°44′25″W
- Country: Portugal
- Auton. region: Azores
- Island: Faial
- Municipality: Horta
- Established: Settlement: 16th century

Area
  - Total: 23.91 km^{2} (9.23 sq mi)
- Elevation: 196 m (643 ft)

Population (2011)
  - Total: 1,309
  - Density: 54.75/km^{2} (141.8/sq mi)
- Time zone: UTC−01:00 (AZOT)
  - Summer (DST): UTC+00:00 (AZOST)
- Postal code: 9900-323
- Area code: (+351) 292 XX XX XX
- Patron: Santa Catarina de Alexandria
- Website: http://www.castelobranco.org

Castelo Branco (pronounced [kɐʃ.ˈte.ɫu ˈbɾɐ̃.ku]) is the southern freguesia ("civil parish") on the island Faial, in the Azores; part of the municipality of Horta. This agricultural community is primarily known for the location of the Central Group's first airport, Horta Airport. The population in 2011 was 1,309, in an area of 23.91 km². It contains the localities Canada da Santa Catarina, Cancela, Cerrado Grande, Farrobim do Norte, Grota do Meio, Jogo, Lombega, Pedreiras, Ribeira Grande and Ribeirinha.

== History ==
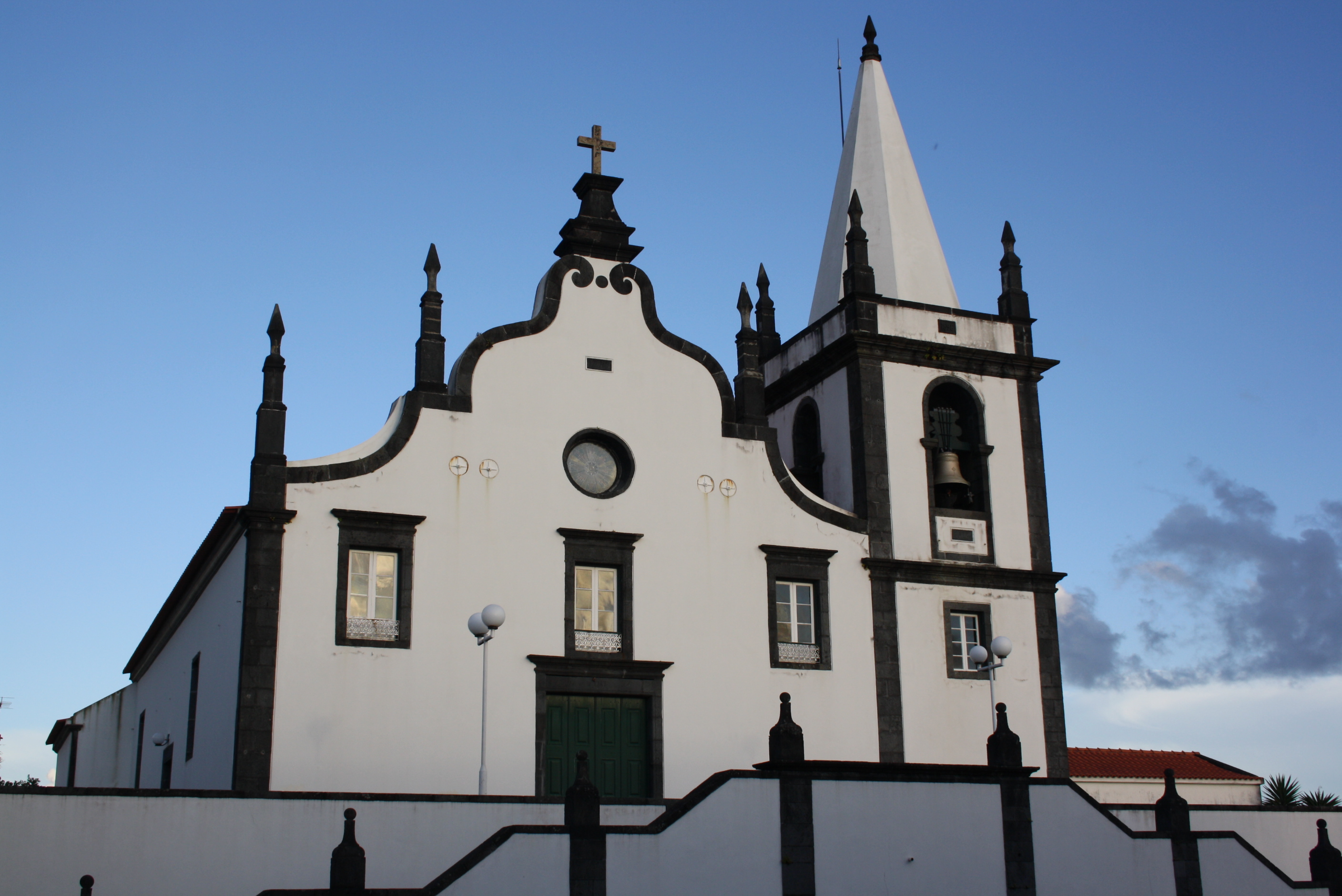
The Church of Santa Catarina, in the junction of several roads in Castelo Branco

The first record of the region referred to its old church, dated 30 July 1568; the church became integrated into the diocese in 1643.

On 10 July 1514, on the orders of King Manuel I the appropriate religious equipment was installed at this primitive church, which was then composed of three naves, and built over 5 columns. Father Gaspar Frutuoso would later note that the church was one of a succession of churches to be formally built in each of the parishes on the island (following those of Horta, Feteira and Flamengos).

Until 1580, a convent existed in the parish, but, owing to the numerous pirate and privateer attacks, the nuns moved their order to Horta, to the Convent of São João Baptista. In 1767, the primitive church was replaced by the existing sanctuary to the adoration of Santa Catarina de Alexandria.

Diogo das Chagas acknowledges that 1,042 inhabitants in 245 residences lived within the borders of Castelo Branco.

The parish was also one of the many parishes depopulated by the 1957 eruption of the Capelinhos volcano, off the coast of Capelo. It contributed to immigration into Europe and North America during the middle of the 20th century, although recently there has been a subtle growth in demographics.

In December 2002, Horta Airport, which is located in the parish, was given its international designation. It was original inaugurated on August 24, 1971 by then-President of the Republic, Américo Tomás. The first direct flights began on July 5, 1985, between Lisbon and Horta on TAP Air Portugal.

== Geography ==
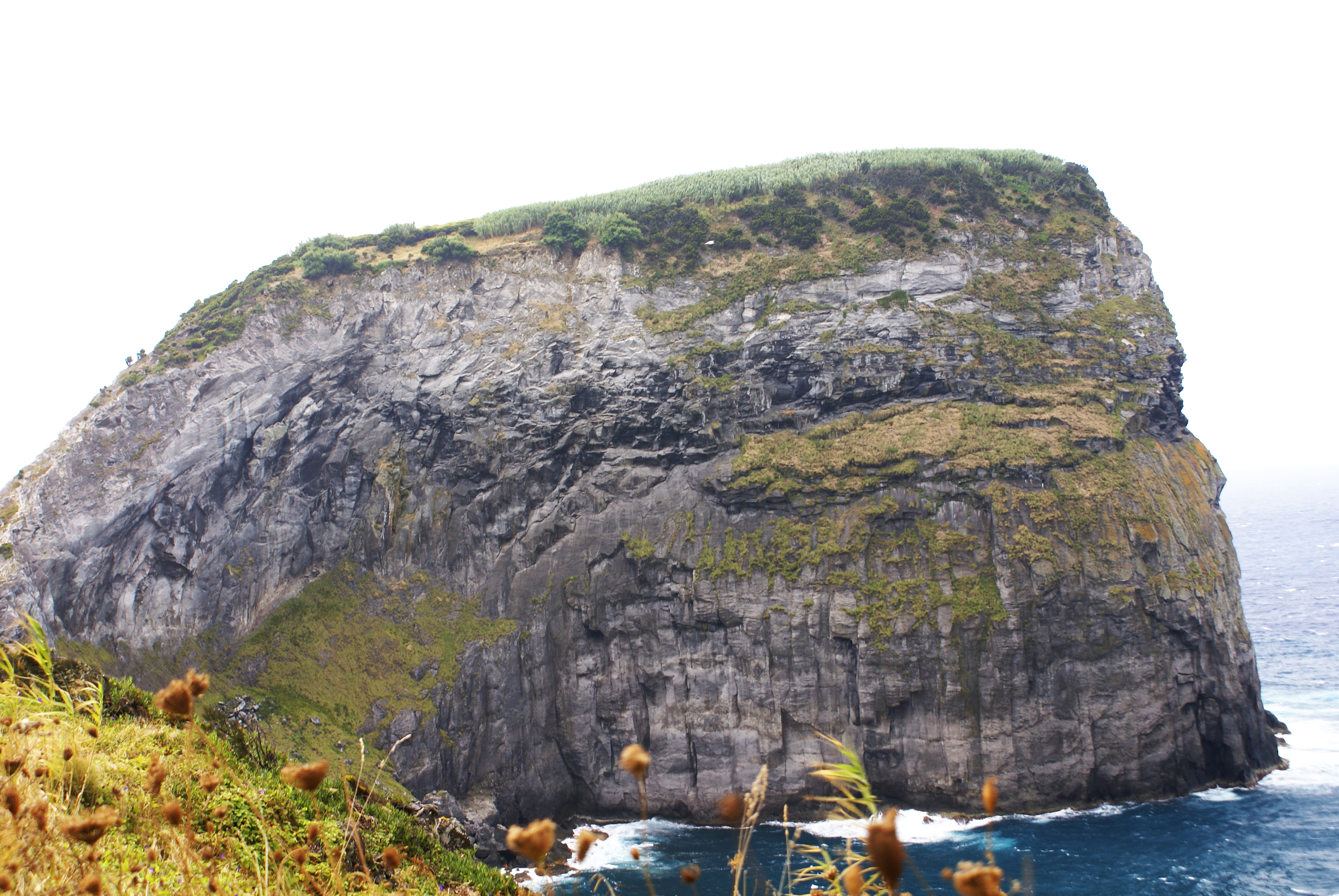
The Morro de Castelo Branco, a protected area for marine and migratory birds

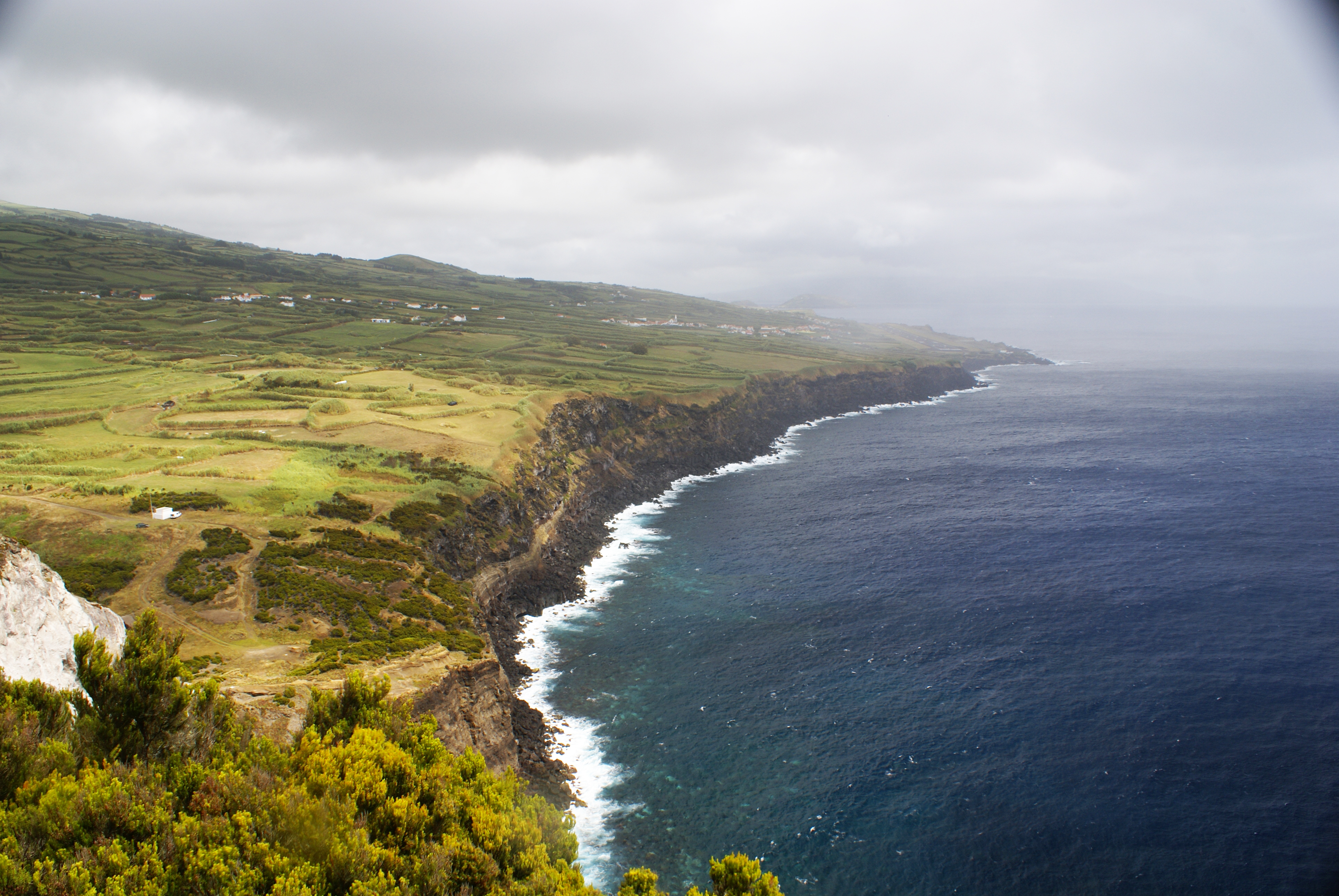
A view of Castelo Branco looking towards the east, from the Morro

Generally, this parish is a zone of pastureland extending from the ocean-front parcels to hillier forests around the Caldeira Volcano. The port at Castelo Branco, the old commercial fishing port, has been transformed into a swimming zone. The principal water courses in this region are: Ribeira de Santa Catarina, Ribeira Grande and Ribeira da Lombega

The name "Castelo Branco" was derived from the location of a white rock dike located at the edge of the parish and connected by a thin rock isthmus, like a medieval "white castle". This Morro de Castelo Branco is a 10,000-year-old rock formation, and a protected area due to the number of bird species that use it as a rookery. The Gruta dos Anelares is located near this area.

== Economy ==
Agriculture is the principal activity in the parish, due to its fertile soils, producing a wide variety of grains and vegetables (such as wheat, rye, barley and pumpkins). Sugar cane, flax seed, and tea have all contributed to the economy of the parish, even cultivating tobacco until recently. Over the centuries, these activities have also included herding and the dairy industry, as well as ancillary services associated with these activities, including cheese and butter production associated with the islands' base industry. Although local production was common, these industries were subsistence, while high-volume production was handled by the islands' remaining export companies, such as CALF Cooperativa Agrícola dos Lactícinios do Faial and Martins & Rebello. At the beginning of 2012, two local entrepreneurs established the Queijaria O Morro that began to produce a local artesnal fresh cheese.

The fishery also adds to the parish's economy, at one time a principal center of whaling and now primarily commercial fishing. It is also common that most involved in these primary industries are also involved in other activities.

In addition to a commercial bakery, the industrial zone of Lombega is the center of the aluminum industry.

Tourism in the region has grown in importance with the development of the International Airport.

== Culture ==
Local handicrafts are an important tradition in the region. For example, a collection of miniature wooden agricultural implements created by António Duarte, are on display by the author in Canada de Santa Catarina. Each piece is a detailed miniature, with a lot of attention to detail. Similarly, other artists, such as José Rosa who work in tin, the painter Lurdes Andrade or the fine embroidery of Isaura Rodrigues are all examples of the traditional handicrafts produced in this parish.

The Sociedade Filarmónica Euterpe de Castelo Branco (a band), founded on April 12, 1912 is the pride of the community, along with its folklore group. In sports, the Futebol Clube de Castelo Branco (founded in 1917) has been active in regional football, challenging other groups in the Horta series.

In addition to the parish's feast day in honor of its patron saint (Santa Catarina de Alexandria), falling on November 25, the community also celebrates other religious events. The festival of Saint Peter (in June), which has become an important event in the religious calendar, and Our Lady of Lourdes (on August 15).

== Architecture ==
=== Civic ===
- Carreira Barrio (Portuguese: Bairro de Casas para Famílias Pobres em Castelo Branco/Bairro da Carreira)
- Carreira Windmill (Portuguese: Moinho de vento da Carreira)
- Residences of Ladeira das Covas (Portuguese: Casas Rurais de Ladeira das Covas)

=== Religious ===
- Church of Santa Catarina de Alexandra (Portuguese: Igreja Paroquial de Castelo Branco/Igreja de Santa Catarina de Alexandria)
- Império of the Divine Holy Spirit of Lombega (Portuguese: Império do Divino Espírito Santo da Lombega)
