= Horta, Azores =

Horta
- Municipality
- Very Loyal City of Horta
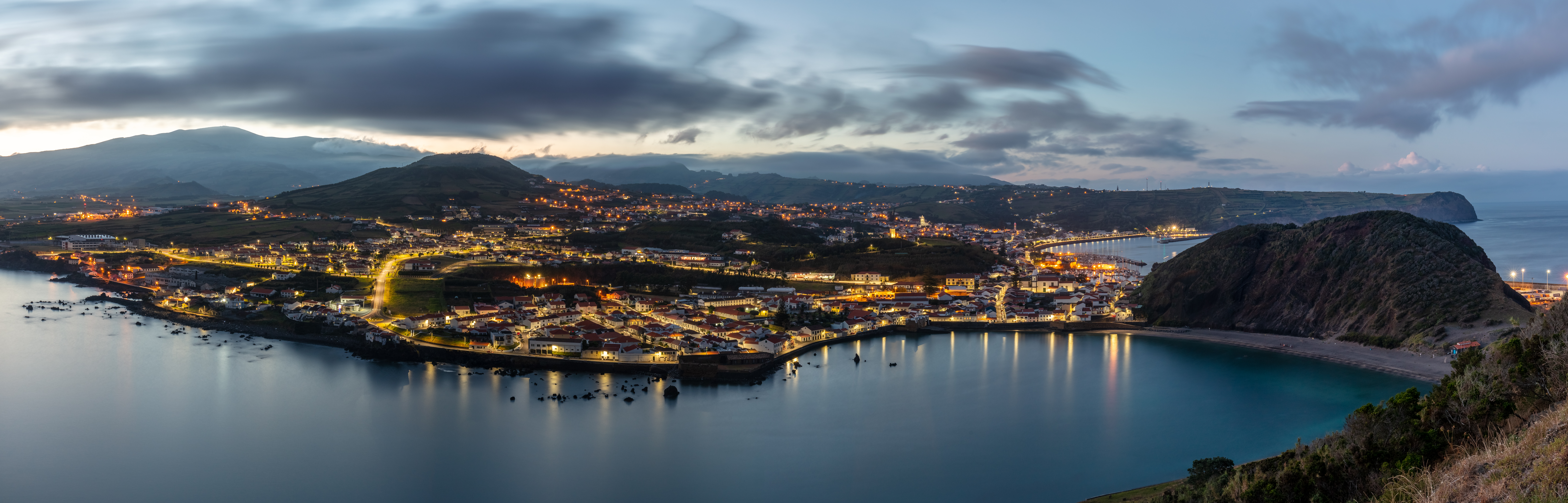
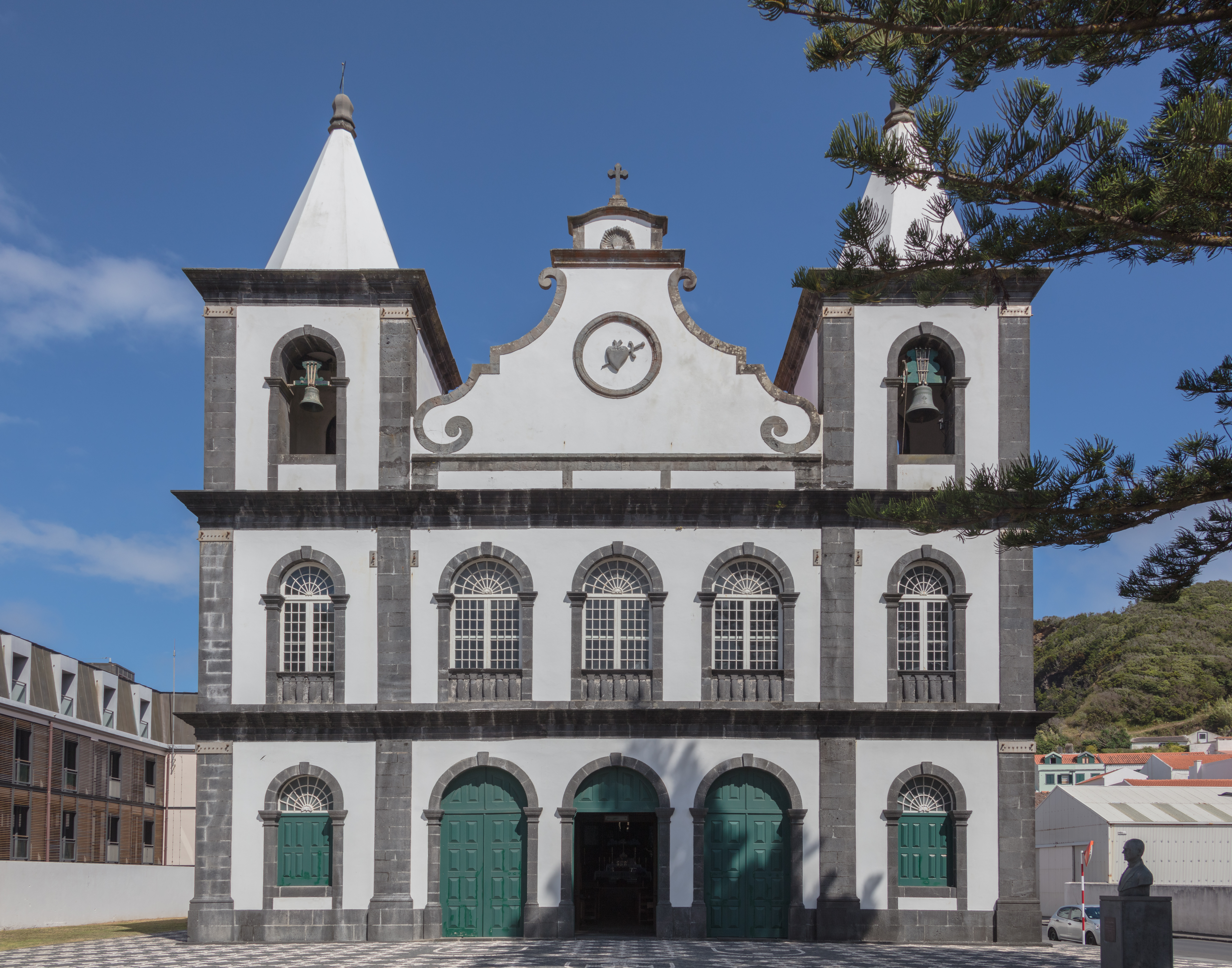
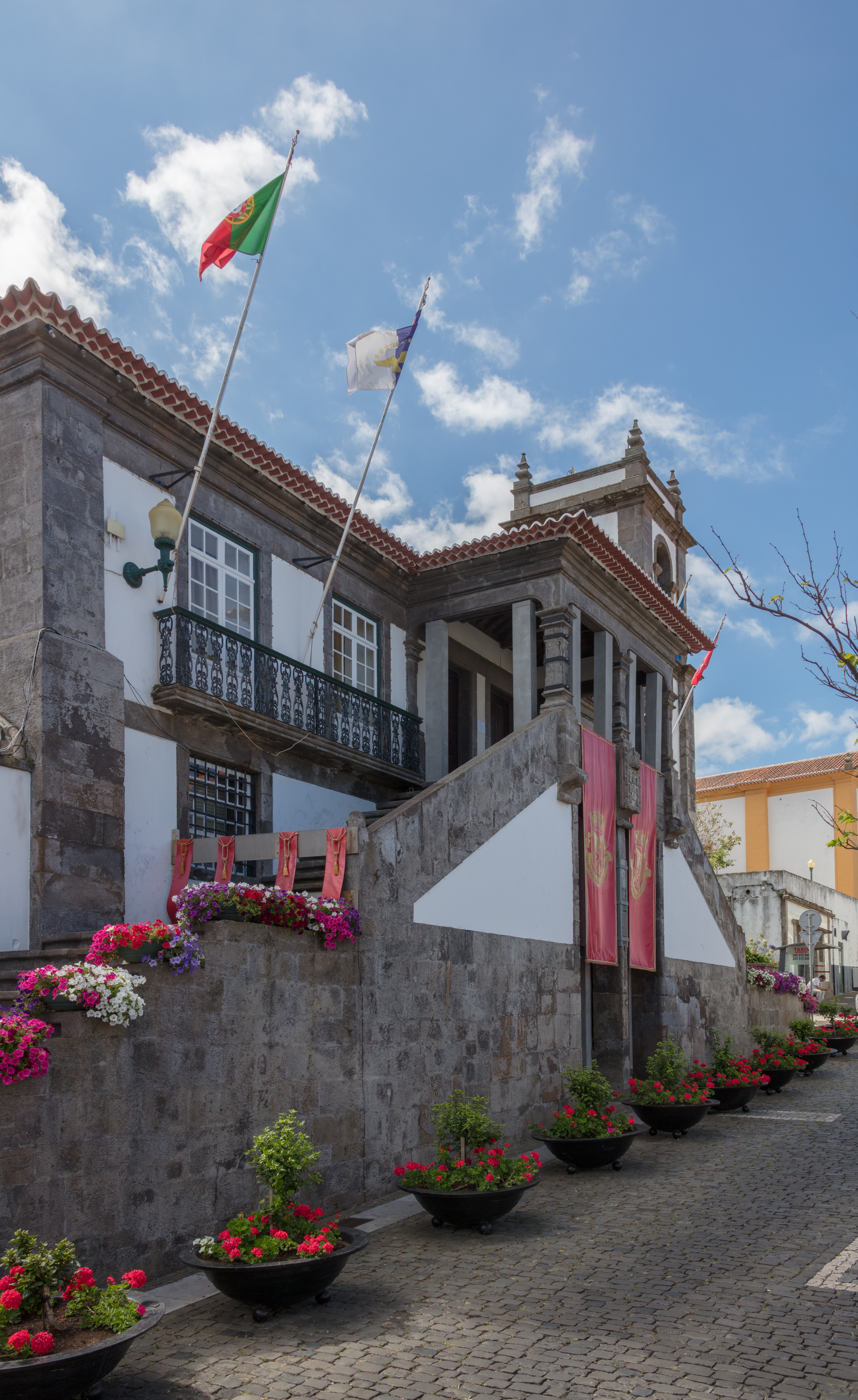
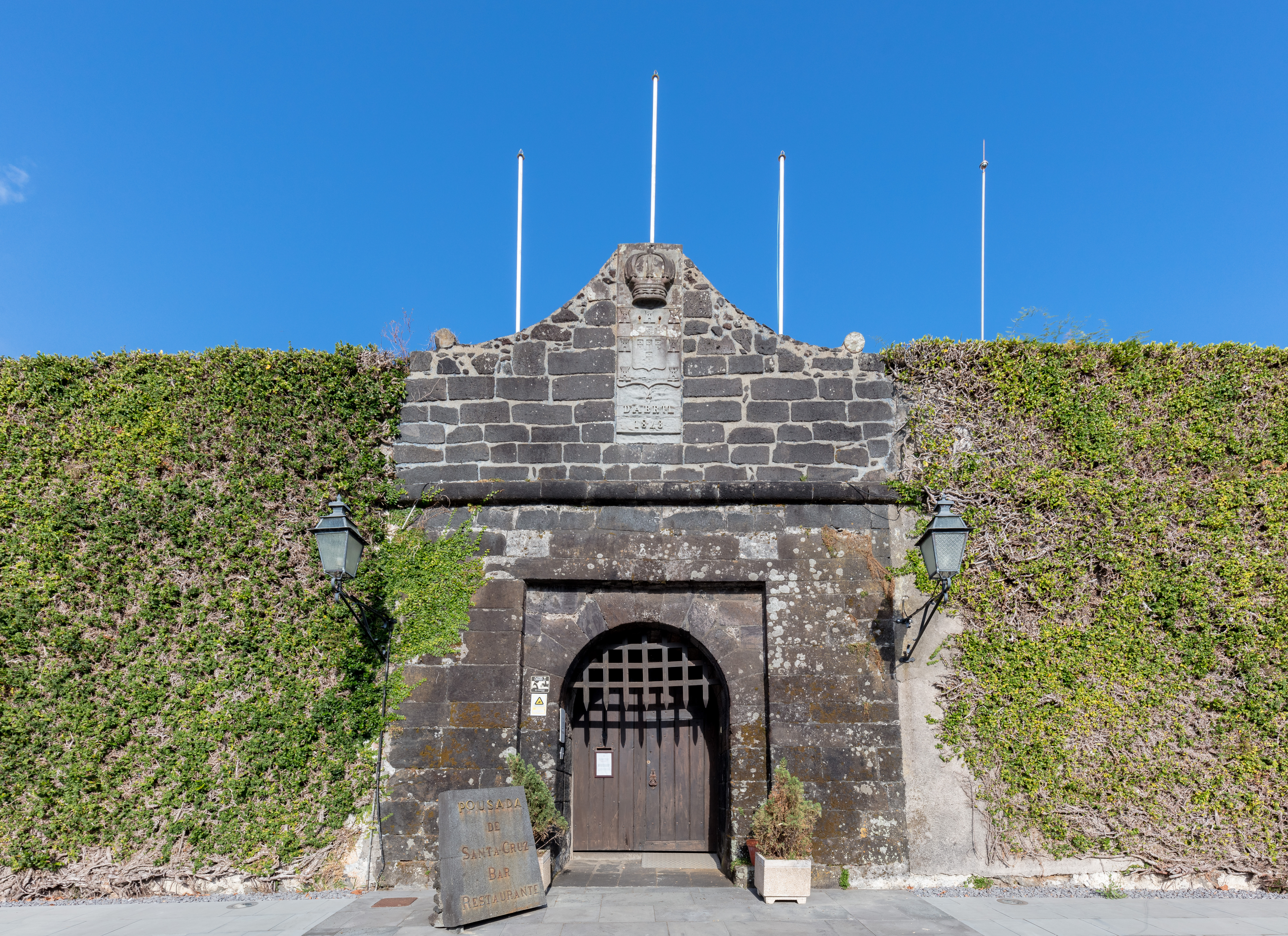
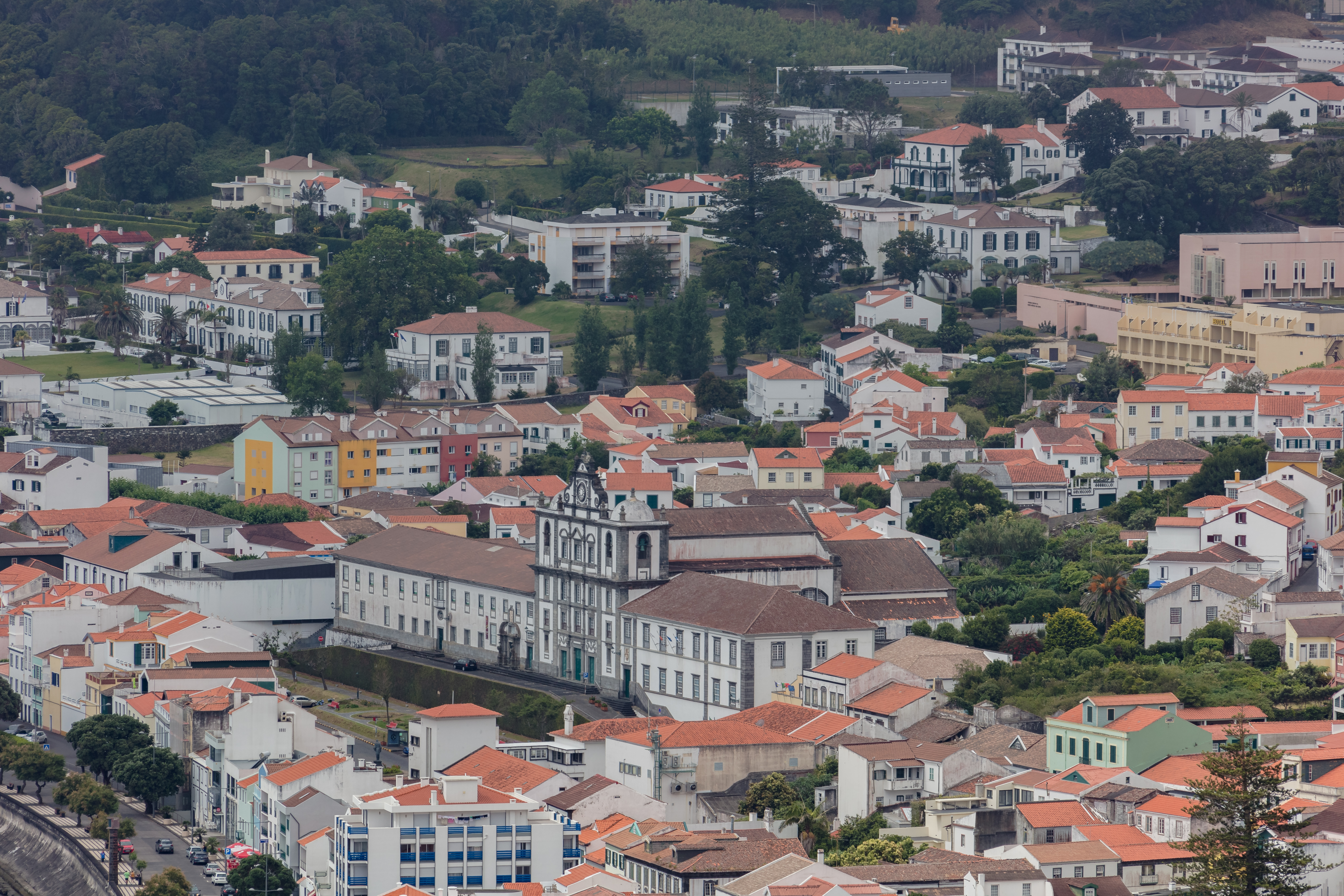
- Panorama of Horta Church of Our Lady of Anguish City Hall Fort of Santa Cruz College of Jesuits

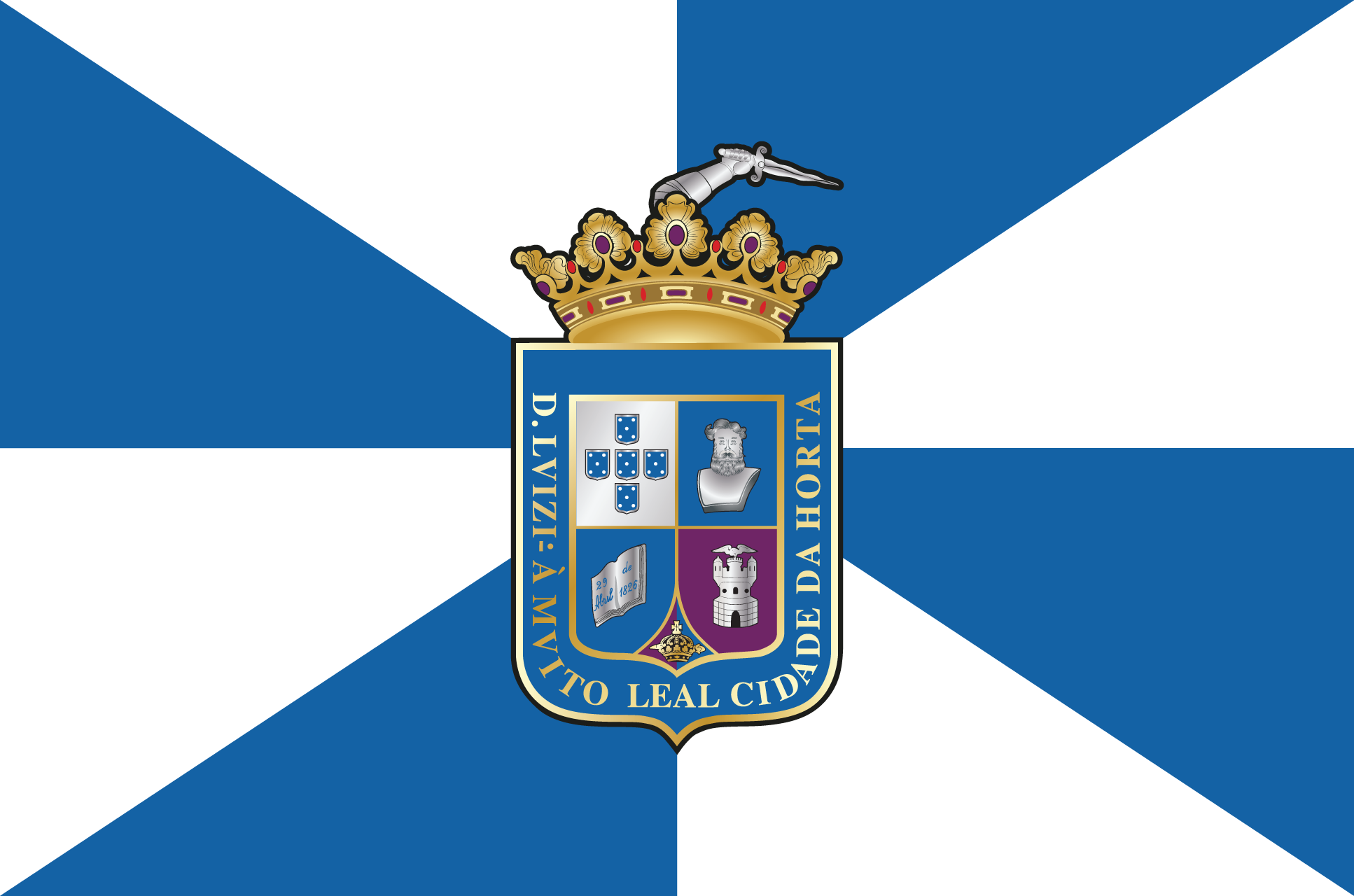
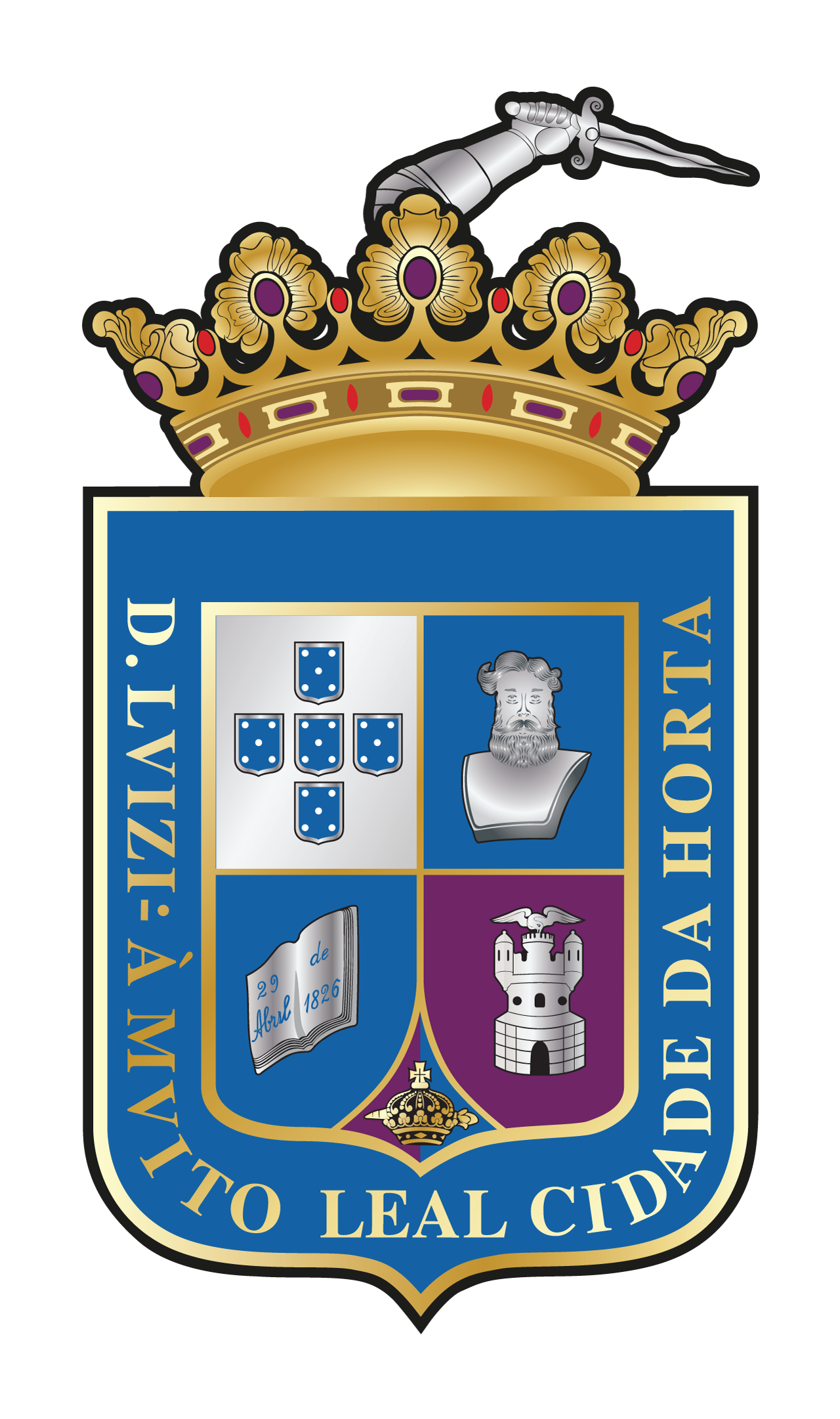
- Flag Coat of arms
- Interactive map of Horta
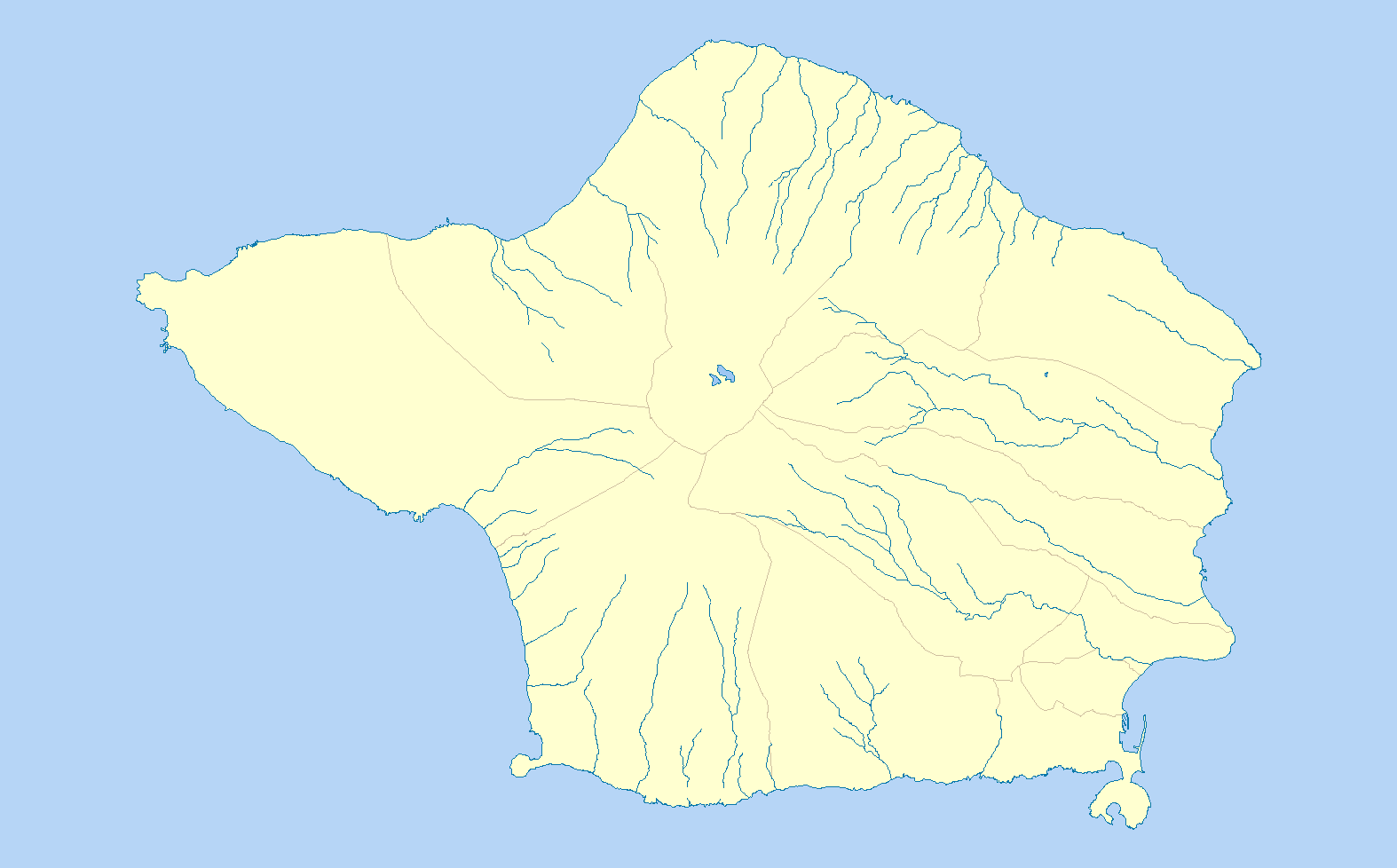
- Location in the Azores Horta (Faial)
- Coordinates: 38°34′46″N 28°42′59″W
- Country: Portugal
- Auton. region: Azores
- Island: Faial
- Established: Settlement: c. 1467; Town: c. 1498; City/Municipality: 4 July 1833
- Parishes: 13

Government
  - President: José Leonardo Goulart da Silva

Area
  - Total: 173.06 km^{2} (66.82 sq mi)
- Elevation: 404 m (1,325 ft)

Population (2021)
  - Total: 14,331
  - Density: 82.809/km^{2} (214.48/sq mi)
- Time zone: UTC−01:00 (AZOT)
  - Summer (DST): UTC+00:00 (AZOST)
- Postal code: 9900-997
- Area code: 292
- Patron: Santíssimo Salvador da Horta
- Local holiday: 24 June
- Website: https://www.cmhorta.pt

Horta, (Note: Portuguese pronunciation: [ˈɔɾtɐ]) officially the Very Loyal City of Horta, (Note: Portuguese: Muito Leal Cidade da Horta) is a city in the Portuguese archipelago of the Azores encompassing the island of Faial with its largely green municipality (Município da Horta) with semi-arid yet fertile hillsides, rising highest away from the city, to the west. About the narrowest width of the island to the east, facing the settlement is the much larger Pico Island noted for wine production. The single-island-municipality's population in 2021 was 14,334 spread over 173 square kilometres (67 mi^{2}). The city as an urban to suburban mass of no more than a tenth of the island has a population of about 7,000.

Horta's marina is a primary stop for yachts crossing the Atlantic Ocean, and its walls and walkways are covered with paintings created by visitors noting the names of their vessels, crews, and the years they visited. Peter's Café Sport is a venue, popular among transatlantic sailers, facing the marina that houses Faial's scrimshaw museum (artifacts carved from whale tooth and jawbone).

The Legislative Assembly of the Azores is in Horta, making it Azores' legislative capital.

== History ==
=== 15th through 17th centuries ===
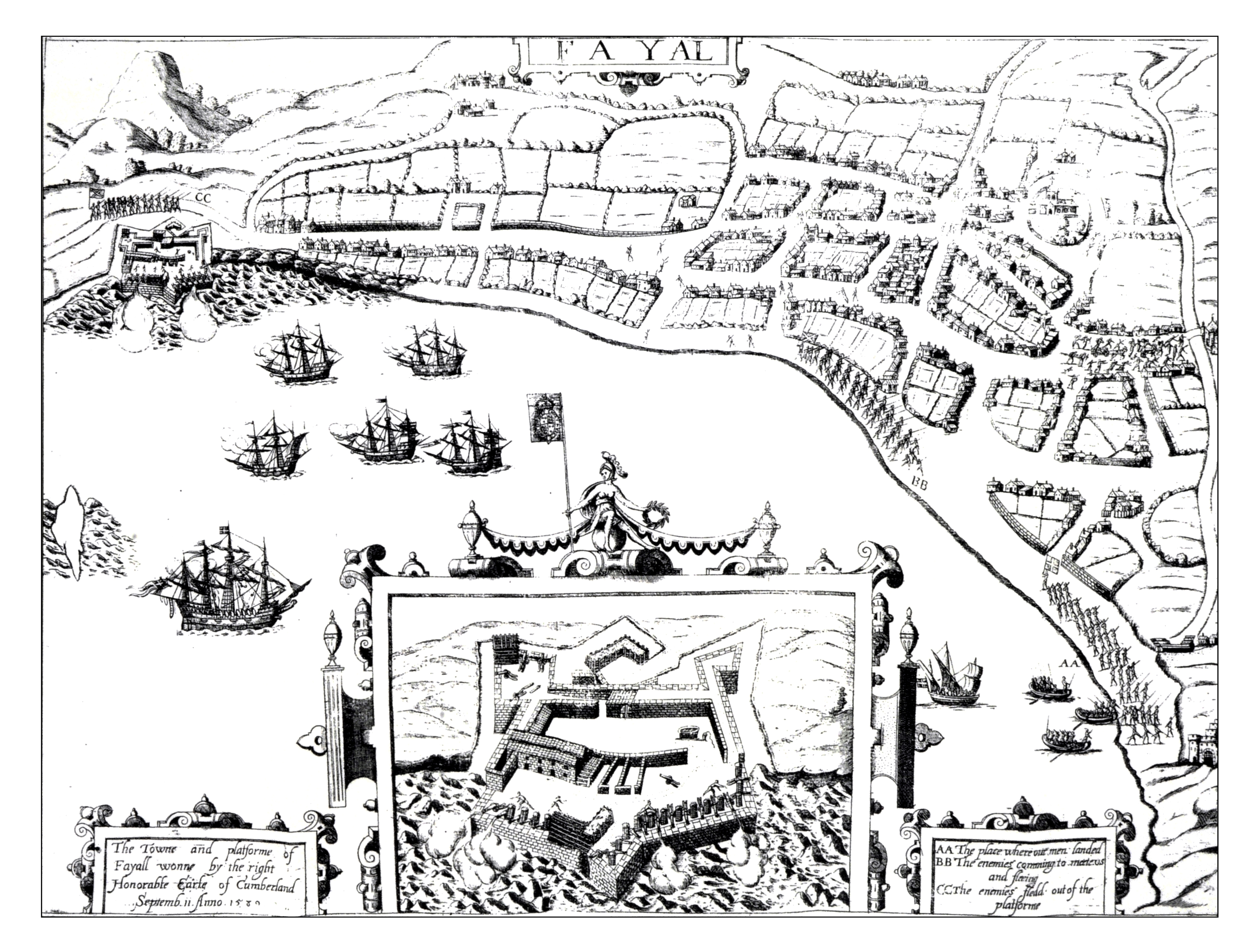
The Bay of Horta showing the main settlement as it appeared in 1589

In 1467 the Flemish nobleman Josse van Huerter returned to Faial on a second expedition, this time disembarking along the shore of what would be known as Horta Bay. He built a small chapel which would later form the nucleus of a small community known as Horta, a name possibly derived from the transliteration of his name. In the Portuguese language the word horta means "orchard," another possible origin of the settlement's name. The infante D. Fernando, Duke of Viseu, granted Huerter the first captaincy of the island on February 2, 1468.

Unlike on other Azorean islands, Flemish peasants and business interests were not the first settlers of Faial. The first Faialense settlers were generally farmers from continental Portugal—particularly northern Portugal—hoping to escape poverty. Huerter eventually cultivated new business opportunities in Flanders, attracting a second wave of Flemish settlers under the stewardship of Willem van der Haegen (later transliterated to Guilherme da Silveira), who brought Flemish administrators, tradesmen, settlers, and other compatriots to settle on Faial.

Huerter's son Joss de Utra (who would become the second Captain-General) and his daughter D. Joana de Macedo (who married Martin Behaim at the Santa Cruz chapel) continued living on Faial long after van Huerter's death. In 1498 King Manuel I of Portugal decreed Horta elevated to the status of vila (town), as its center had grown to the north from the area around the Santa Cruz chapel. The island prospered by exporting wheat and woad-derived dyes.

On June 28, 1514, the parish of Matriz do São Salvador da Horta was constituted and services were begun. In 1567 the cornerstone of what would be the Fort of Santa Cruz was laid. Horta's increasing population compelled the creation of the parishes of Nossa Senhora da Conceição (July 30, 1568) and Nossa Senhora da Angustias (November 28, 1684) by the diocese of Angra. As two nuclei developed around Santa Cruz and Porto Pim, growth also extended around the older Matriz, where the Tower Clock now stands, and the public square, where Alameda Barão de Roches now exists. Public buildings were erected between Rua Visconde Leite Perry and Rua Arriage Nunes and eventually the town hall and court offices moved to the former Jesuit College, after the Jesuits were expelled from Portugal in 1758.

In 1583—during the beginning of the Iberian Union—Spanish soldiers under the command of D. Pedro de Toledo landed in Pasteleiro on Faial's southwestern coast. After skirmishing at the doors of the fort, the Spanish executed Captain of Faial António Guedes de Sousa. Four years later George Clifford, 3rd Earl of Cumberland—while commanding a fleet of 13 British ships in the Azores Voyage of 1589—captured a Spanish ship and then plundered Faial's churches and convents, profaning them and destroying reliquaries and crucifixes. The British captured several artillery pieces and set fire to houses within the Fort of Santa Cruz. In 1597 a new British force under Walter Raleigh, second in command to Robert Devereux, Earl of Essex, sacked and burned religious buildings and churches in Horta and the neighboring parishes of Flamengos, Feteira, and Praia do Almoxarife. The constant threat of privateers and pirates forced the construction of several forts and lookouts.

In 1643, Horta had about 2579 inhabitants and 610 homes. In 1675 D. Frei Lourenço, Bishop of Angra, authorized the renovation and re-ornamentation of the chapel of Santa Cruz. This work was completed in 1688.

=== 18th and 19th centuries ===
During the 18th and 19th centuries, Horta was a small town extending along the shoreline. It was peppered by various convents and churches, but little commerce and almost no industry. However, due to its central location in the Azores and Atlantic Ocean, it prospered as a stopover on important commercial routes between Europe and the Americas. For a time Horta was a center of commerce and travel, particularly as a gateway for Azorean orange exports and exports of wine from Pico Island, as well as an important stop for North American whalers, and later as a refueling port for coal-powered ships during their transatlantic passages.

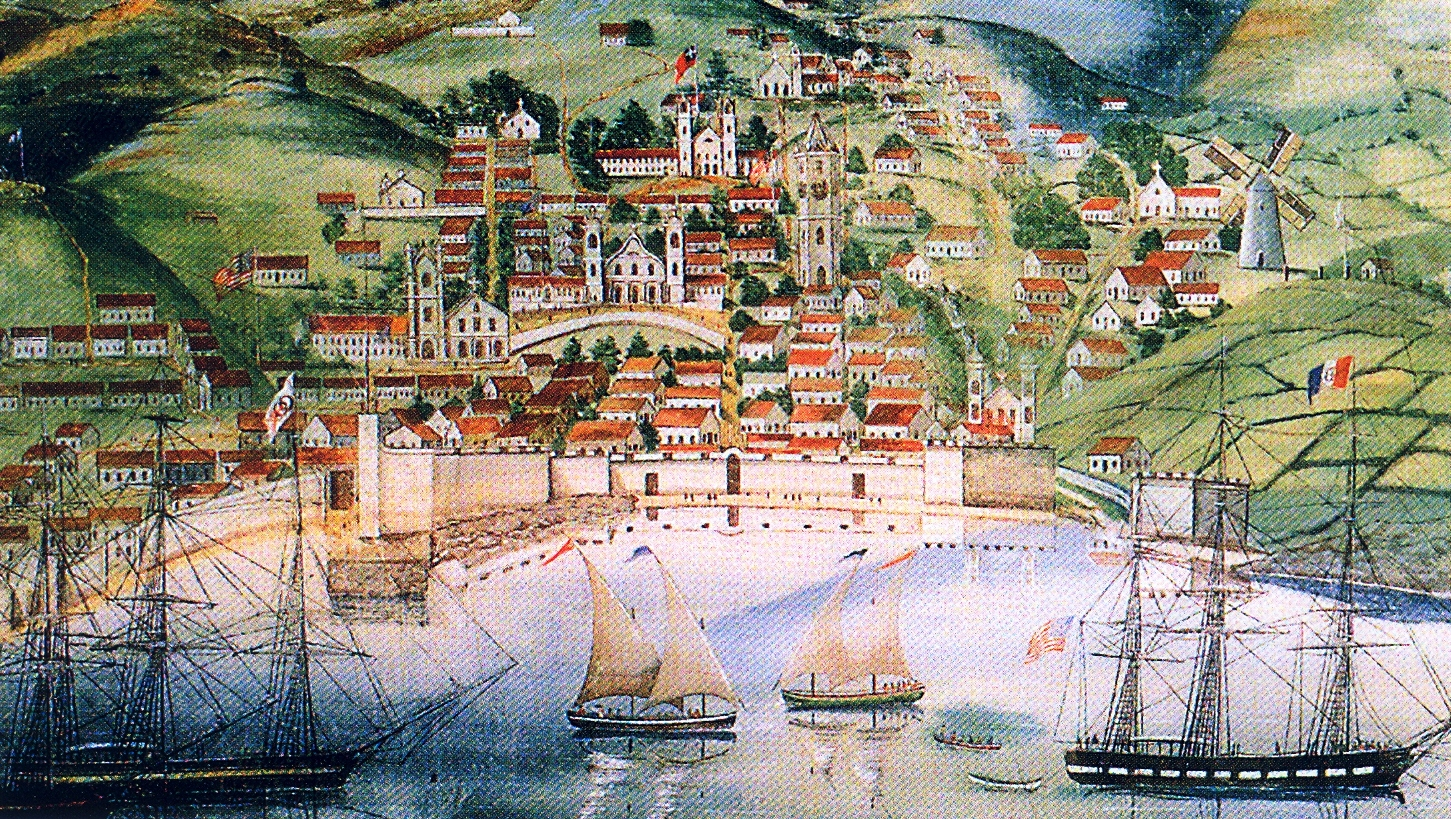
A vista of the village of Horta, Faial from the New Bedford Whaling Museum, c.1842 (Purrington & Russel)

In 1804 John Bass Dabney (1766–1826), the United States Consul General in the Azores, married Roxanne Lewis and moved to a home in Horta. Their son Charles William Dabney (who later married Francis Alsop Pomeroy) succeeded his father in this position and played an important part in the history and economy of Horta and Faial. This was helped by the construction of a commercial port in 1876 and the installation of transatlantic telegraph cables in 1893. The Dabney family steered the island's economy for 83 years with good effect on the dynamic growth of the port, the export of oranges and Verdelho wine from Pico, and commerce related to the whaling industry.

On September 26, 1814, the American privateer brig General Armstrong, under the command of Samuel Chester Reid, was sunk by three ships of the British Royal Navy under the command of Robert Lloyd. After being forced to scuttle his ship, Reid formally protested the ship's destruction in a neutral port, criticizing Portuguese incapacity to defend their own waters. Her principal piece of naval artillery, the cannon "Long Tom", was later recovered from Horta Bay. It was eventually offered to General Batcheller, the United States Minister in Lisbon, in compensation. General Batcheller returned to Horta to pick up the cannon and delivered it to New York City on board the ship USS Vega on or about April 18, 1893.

On July 4, 1833, the vila of Horta, through the initiative of the Duke d'Ávila and Bolama, was elevated to the status of city and the district capital as a reward for Faial's support of Liberal forces during the Portuguese Liberal Revolution. The city hall's coat of arms were changed to read “Very Loyal City of Horta” by decree of King Luís I of Portugal on May 3, 1865.

Construction of Horta's commercial port in 1876 increased the city's international importance. On August 23, 1893, the first telegraph cables linking Horta (Alagoa) and Lisbon (Carcavelos) made Horta a link in transatlantic communication. The presence of several foreign cable companies in Horta increased the economic activity and development, urban growth, and frequency of cultural and sporting activities on the island. Between 1893 and 1969 Horta was an important post in intercontinental communications.

=== 20th century ===
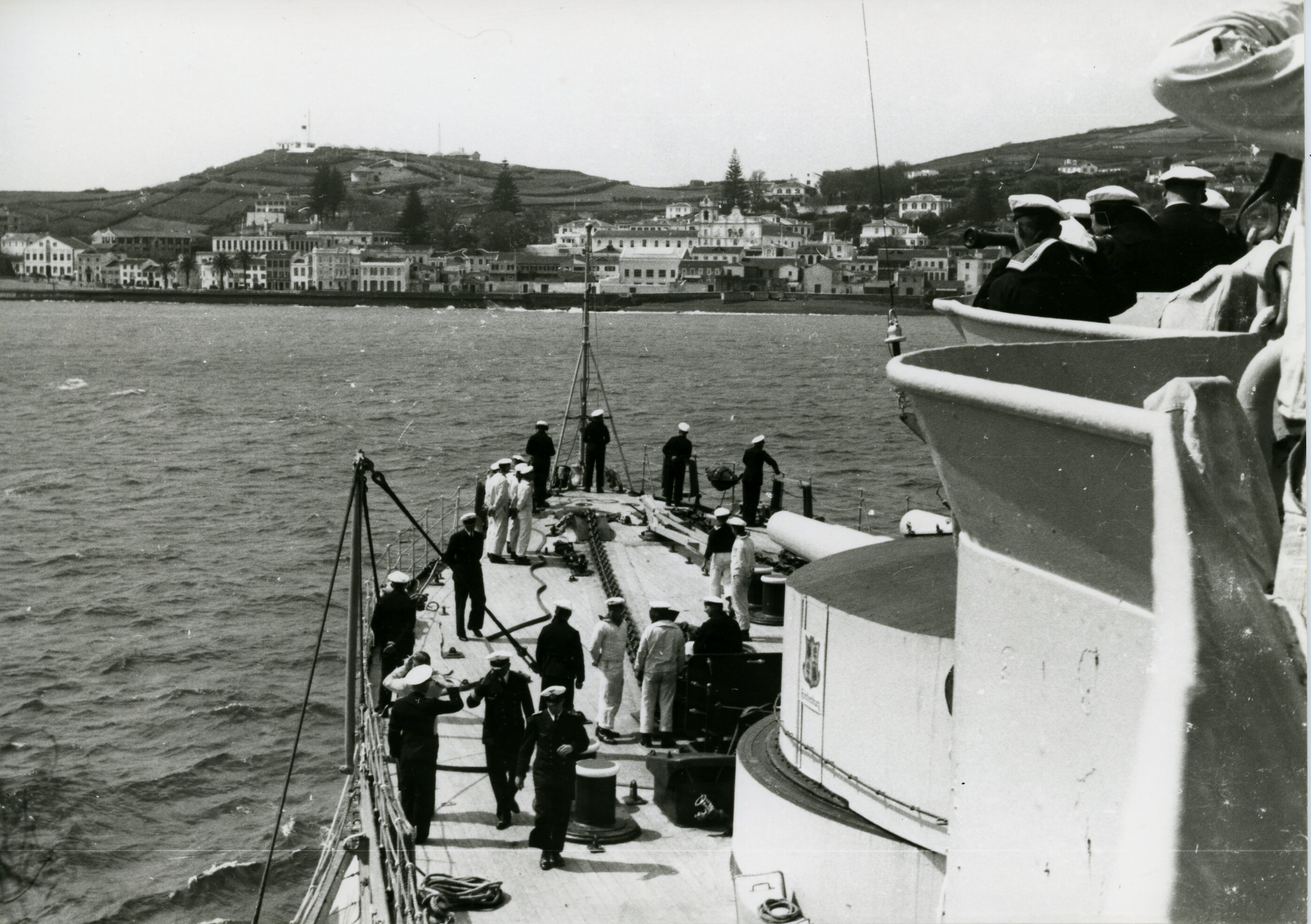
A view of Horta harbour from the German battleship Schlesien before the outbreak of World War II

Horta entered into the annals of early aviation history when United States Navy Captain Albert Cushing Read completed the first Atlantic leg of the first transatlantic flight when he landed his Curtiss NC-4 floatplane in the Bay of Horta in May 1919.

In 1921 Dutch seagoing tugboats began using Horta as a stopover. After a hiatus during World War II, they returned during the period of European reconstruction.

After 1939 Horta was a scheduled waypoint on the transatlantic flying boat routes between North America and Europe, including the Pan Am Clipper fleet which docked in Horta harbour.

By 1960 yachts started using Horta's sheltered port during transatlantic voyages.

On 24 August 1971, in the civil parish of Castelo Branco, President of Portugal Américo Tomás inaugurated the Horta Airport. Since 1972 the Sociedade Açoreana de Transportes Aéreos (which was the forerunner of SATA Air Azores) has provided scheduled flights from Horta to the islands of the triangle (Central Group). During the 1980s TAP Air Portugal, the national flag carrier, established direct service from Horta to Lisbon, while further fleet improvements allowed SATA to directly link Horta with all Azorean islands. Following major renovations in December 2001, the airport was designated an international airport, although no foreign airlines have scheduled or charter flights arriving at Horta Airport.

Periodic improvements to Horta harbour allowed the city to become a stopover for yachts and cruise ships and provide ongoing assistance to transatlantic voyagers. This was facilitated when the municipal authority inaugurated a 300-slip marina on 3 June 1986. Horta harbour is a fleet centre for the Azorean ferry lines Transmaçor and Atlanticoline, resulting in new investments and the construction of a secondary pier for inter-island passenger traffic.

== Geography ==
=== Climate ===
Horta has a mild maritime climate, which according to Köppen can be classified as a humid subtropical climate with significant Mediterranean influences. The average annual temperature is around 18 °C (64 °F). Precipitation averages about 1,087 millimetres (42.8 in) per year and is particularly concentrated from October to March. July and August are the driest months. Temperatures are mild to warm year-round and average 20 °C (68 °F) in the daytime and 15 °C (59 °F) at night.

Climate data for Horta (Observatório Príncipe Alberto do Mónaco), altitude: 55 metres (180 ft), 1991-2020 normals, 1961-1990 sunshine hours
Month	Jan	Feb	Mar	Apr	May	Jun	Jul	Aug	Sep	Oct	Nov	Dec	Year
Record high °C (°F)	20.5 (68.9)	21.4 (70.5)	22.2 (72.0)	23.4 (74.1)	23.2 (73.8)	28.6 (83.5)	30.0 (86.0)	31.1 (88.0)	29.7 (85.5)	27.6 (81.7)	25.0 (77.0)	22.5 (72.5)	31.1 (88.0)
Mean daily maximum °C (°F)	16.9 (62.4)	16.7 (62.1)	16.9 (62.4)	17.8 (64.0)	19.1 (66.4)	21.6 (70.9)	24.4 (75.9)	25.8 (78.4)	24.6 (76.3)	21.9 (71.4)	19.3 (66.7)	17.8 (64.0)	20.2 (68.4)
Daily mean °C (°F)	14.9 (58.8)	14.5 (58.1)	14.7 (58.5)	15.5 (59.9)	16.8 (62.2)	19.1 (66.4)	21.7 (71.1)	23.0 (73.4)	22.0 (71.6)	19.5 (67.1)	17.2 (63.0)	15.7 (60.3)	17.9 (64.2)
Mean daily minimum °C (°F)	12.9 (55.2)	12.2 (54.0)	12.5 (54.5)	13.1 (55.6)	14.4 (57.9)	16.6 (61.9)	19.0 (66.2)	20.2 (68.4)	19.4 (66.9)	17.2 (63.0)	15.1 (59.2)	13.6 (56.5)	15.5 (59.9)
Record low °C (°F)	5.1 (41.2)	4.7 (40.5)	3.0 (37.4)	6.9 (44.4)	8.7 (47.7)	12.4 (54.3)	14.8 (58.6)	16.0 (60.8)	14.5 (58.1)	6.7 (44.1)	7.5 (45.5)	5.3 (41.5)	3.0 (37.4)
Average precipitation mm (inches)	105.4 (4.15)	92.8 (3.65)	113.7 (4.48)	77.2 (3.04)	77.7 (3.06)	59.0 (2.32)	41.8 (1.65)	47.8 (1.88)	87.9 (3.46)	132.2 (5.20)	111.9 (4.41)	139.7 (5.50)	1,087.2 (42.80)
Average precipitation days (≥ 1 mm)	13.3	12.2	13.0	10.9	9.0	8.4	5.5	6.8	9.7	13.6	11.6	15.2	129.1
Average relative humidity (%)	80	80	80	79	81	81	80	80	80	79	80	81	80
Mean monthly sunshine hours	91	95	120	155	182	174	232	238	178	144	103	83	1,795
Source 1: IPMA (normals & precipitation)
Source 2: NOAA (sunshine hours & humidity)

Climate data for Horta (Monte da Guia), elevation: 62 m or 203 ft, 1971-1994 normals, 1961-1990 extremes
Month	Jan	Feb	Mar	Apr	May	Jun	Jul	Aug	Sep	Oct	Nov	Dec	Year
Record high °C (°F)	21.1 (70.0)	21.1 (70.0)	21.1 (70.0)	25.0 (77.0)	24.5 (76.1)	27.8 (82.0)	30.6 (87.1)	31.1 (88.0)	30.0 (86.0)	27.8 (82.0)	25.0 (77.0)	23.9 (75.0)	31.1 (88.0)
Mean daily maximum °C (°F)	16.4 (61.5)	16.0 (60.8)	16.5 (61.7)	17.3 (63.1)	19.0 (66.2)	21.4 (70.5)	24.3 (75.7)	25.5 (77.9)	24.2 (75.6)	21.4 (70.5)	19.0 (66.2)	17.3 (63.1)	19.9 (67.7)
Daily mean °C (°F)	14.3 (57.7)	13.7 (56.7)	14.2 (57.6)	14.9 (58.8)	16.5 (61.7)	18.8 (65.8)	21.4 (70.5)	22.4 (72.3)	21.5 (70.7)	18.9 (66.0)	16.9 (62.4)	15.2 (59.4)	17.4 (63.3)
Mean daily minimum °C (°F)	12.1 (53.8)	11.4 (52.5)	12.0 (53.6)	12.5 (54.5)	13.9 (57.0)	16.2 (61.2)	18.5 (65.3)	19.4 (66.9)	18.7 (65.7)	16.5 (61.7)	14.7 (58.5)	13.1 (55.6)	14.9 (58.9)
Record low °C (°F)	3.3 (37.9)	3.9 (39.0)	5.0 (41.0)	5.0 (41.0)	8.3 (46.9)	11.1 (52.0)	13.9 (57.0)	15.0 (59.0)	11.1 (52.0)	10.6 (51.1)	8.9 (48.0)	3.9 (39.0)	3.3 (37.9)
Average rainfall mm (inches)	90.0 (3.54)	94.0 (3.70)	74.9 (2.95)	63.4 (2.50)	58.7 (2.31)	47.2 (1.86)	33.5 (1.32)	54.5 (2.15)	95.6 (3.76)	115.3 (4.54)	123.8 (4.87)	111.1 (4.37)	962 (37.87)
Average relative humidity (%)	80	80	80	79	81	81	80	80	80	79	80	81	80
Mean monthly sunshine hours	91	95	120	155	182	174	232	238	178	144	103	83	1,795
Source 1: IPMA (normals & precipitation)
Source 2: NOAA (sunshine hours & humidity), Worldwide Bioclimatic Classification System (extremes)

=== Human geography ===
Population of Horta (1849 - 2011)
Year	Pop.	±%
1849	24,763	—
1900	22,075	−10.9%
1930	21,510	−2.6%
1960	20,281	−5.7%
1981	15,489	−23.6%
1991	14,920	−3.7%
2001	15,063	+1.0%
2004	15,224	+1.1%
2011	15,038	−1.2%
2021	14,331	−4.7%

Three parishes comprise the urban area of the city of Horta (the urbanized area and historical center): Angústias, Conceição, and Matriz. The remaining parishes comprising the rest of the municipality are located along the Regional E.R.1-1ª road network, and includes lands from the ocean to the central volcano (with the exception of Flamengos, which is the only landlocked parish). Faial Island, comprising Horta's urbanized area and the parishes, has an area of 173.06 square kilometres (66.82 mi^{2})

- Capelo - located in the western portion of the island that includes the most recent historic volcanism on the island; location of the Capelinhos Volcano and Recreational Forest Park
- Castelo Branco - located on the southern coastal area between Capelo and Feteiras; location of Horta International Airport
- Cedros - largest civil parish and agricultural lands, located on the northern coast between Capelo and Salão
- Feteira - southern parish located between the urbanized core of Horta and Castelo Branco; primarily agricultural activities in transition into suburban community of Horta
- Flamengos - the only landlocked civil parish on the island, established by original settlers from the Low Countries of Europe
- Pedro Miguel - located to the north of Praia do Almoxarife, along the eastern coast
- Praia do Almoxarife - original settlers disembarked along the beach of Praia do Almoxarife during the original 1465 and 1467 expeditions; currently the main tourist beach community on the island
- Praia do Norte - located between Cedros and Capelo, a zone affected by historic volcanism from the Capelo Volcanic Complex
- Ribeirinha - a civil parish occupying the ancient geological zone that formed the island of Faial
- Salão - settled by Spanish during the Iberian Union, and located between Cedros and Ribeirinha

In 2011, the national census discovered a resident population of 15,038: a slight decrease from the 2001 population (15,063 inhabitants). Yet, the number of aggregate families grew significantly (4795 to 5465 families reporting their participation in such groups), an increase from 2.8 to 3.1 people per family. Similarly, there has been a 21.69% increase in the number occupied buildings within the municipality.

==== City of Horta ====
I love Horta like loquats! I had a longing of what was, I don't know how, of here. Everything imagined is more or less frustrated when we comprehend: but in Horta, no, it is exceeded. At the end of the Rua do Mar are the built-up homes; over the unique celebretated road of the town are the alleyways that descend to the coast and provide a modest contribution to the fires and transit.

— Vitorino Nemésio

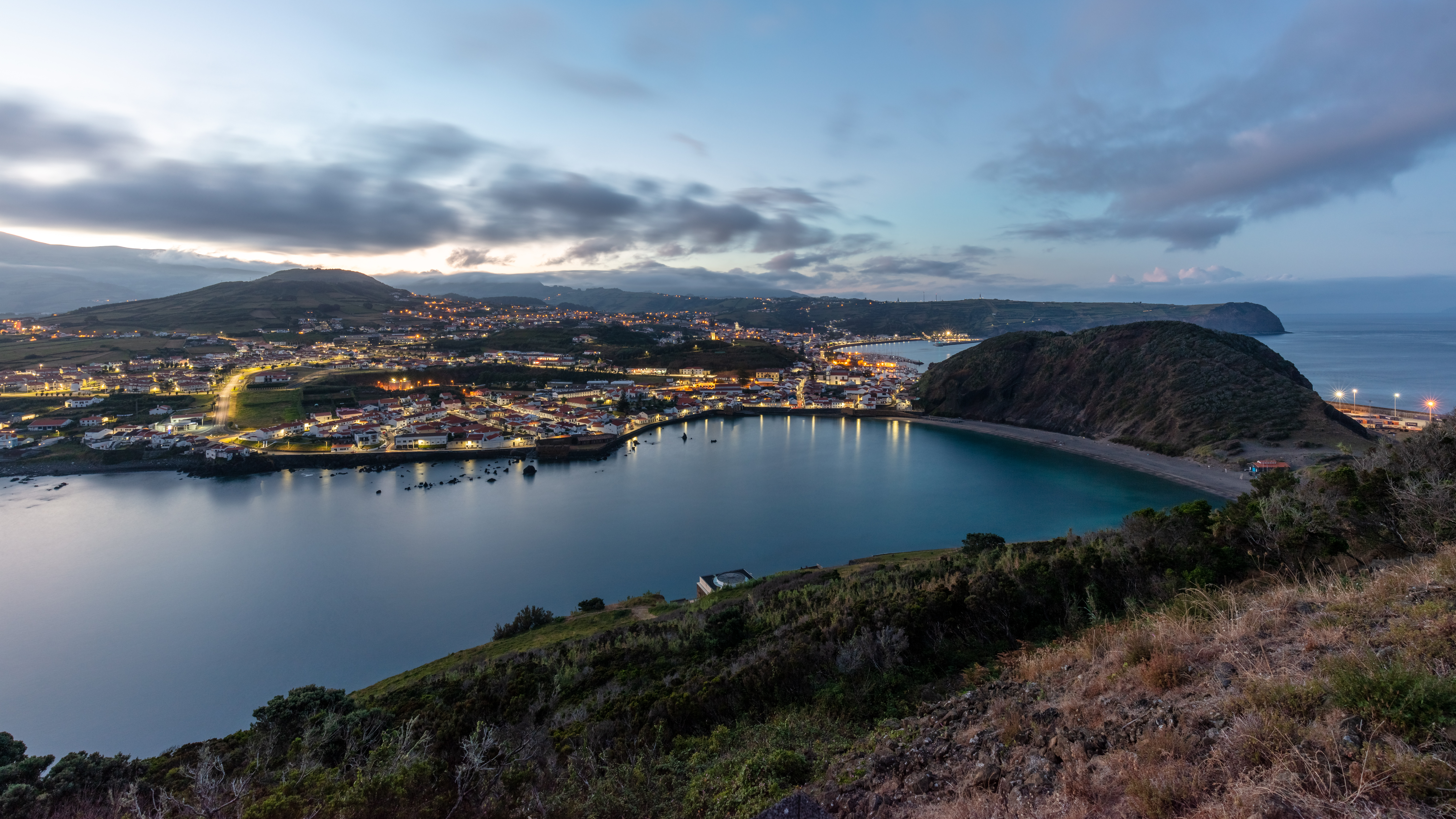
Horta and its marina from Monte da Guia

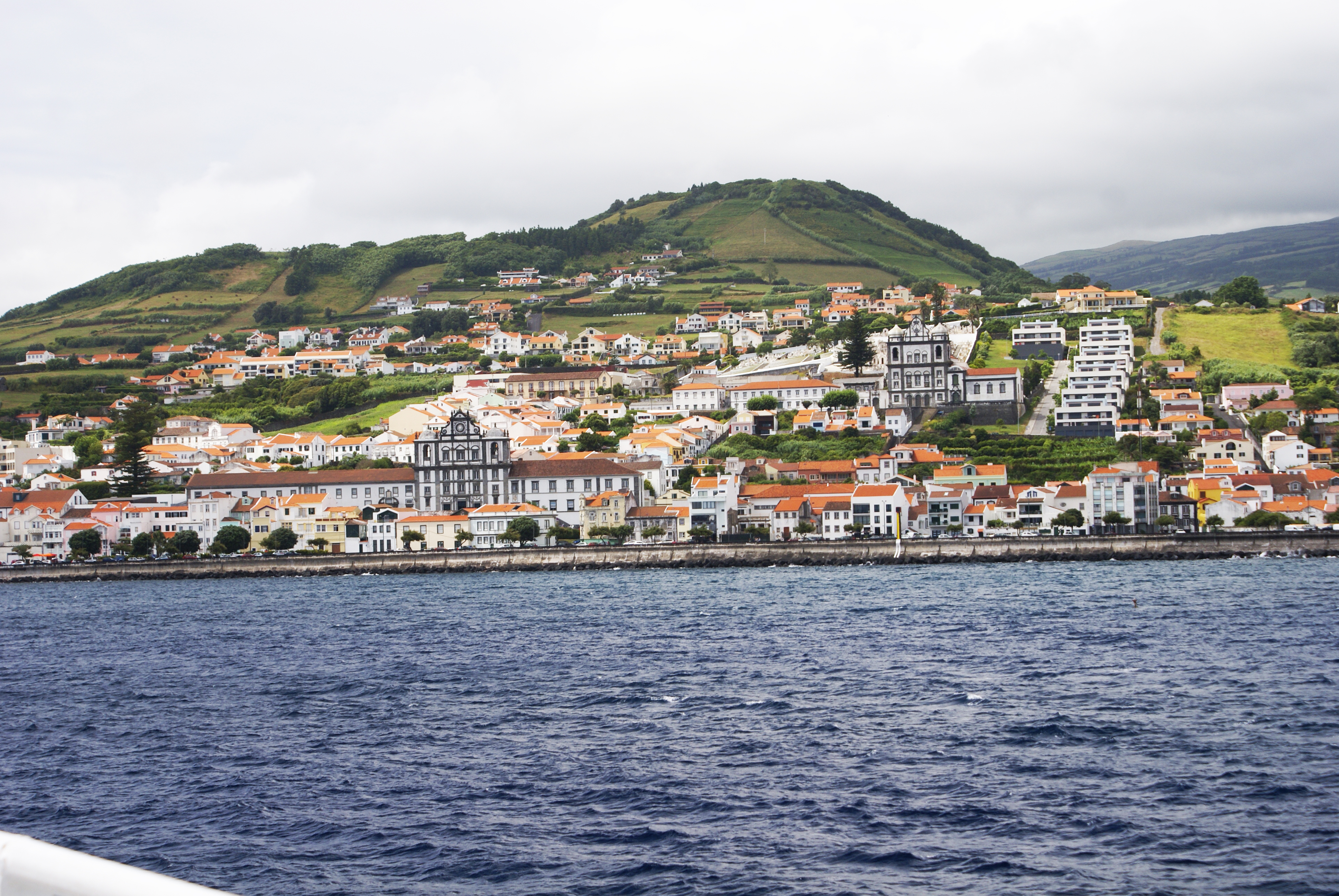
The centre of Horta, with a view that includes the Câmara Municipal (left foreground) and Carmo Church (right background)

From Espalamaca or Monte da Guia, the city of Horta is typical of insular Portuguese coastal communities and the urban traditions of the Middle Ages and Renaissance. The city is seaward looking, much like Angra do Heroísmo or Velas. It is rounded by several volcanic cones located to its southern and eastern margins, the most prominent being Monte da Guaia, Monte do Carneiro, and Monte Escuro. Horta is centered along its principal avenue—referred to as either Avenida Marginal or Avenida D. Infante Henriques—and cut by several smaller roads. The city's historical center lies to the north near Espalamaca, with a grouping of north–south and east–west roads developed during initial colonization. The population of Horta's urban center during the first decade of the 21st century was about 7,000.

Horta grew from streets such as:

- Rua Vista Alegre/Ladeira da Paiva/travessa Almeida Garrett (that includes the Church Matriz, and Convent of Saint John);
- Rua Advogado Graça/Travessa do Poiso Novo (where the original Casa da Câmara and Convent of Glory were situated);
- Rua de São Paulo;
- Rua de São Pedro and Travessa da Misericórdia; and,
- Rua Dr. Azevedo and Calçada M. Vila, near the entrance to the Largo do Colégio.
- Rua de São João
- Rua Ten. Aragão (currently between the Império dos Nobres and the Sociedade Amor da Pátria)
- Rua da Conceição/Alameda Barão de Roches/Rua D. Pedro IV/Rua E. Rebelo, with the Pelourinho, the Casa da Câmara and older urban prison (Cadeia), the Convent of Glory, this area constituted the original Vila of Horta. The oldest dwellings and the older ornate façades are located in this area.
- Rua Maestro Simaria, located near the Rua Serpa Pinto, and the ancient Largo do Colégio Jesuíta;
- Rua Conselheiro Miguel da Silveira, and open to the Avenida Marginal.

These streets formed from the central colony along hills parallel to each other and perpendicular to the ocean. Littoral growth was made cautiously until the town square, civic center, town hall, and local water wells were built along the seashore in both directions. Religious institutions generally mark the extent of urbanized–rural limits (as the Convent of Nossa Senhora do Carmo and Convent of the Capuchos do today to the northeast).

Modern Horta grew beyond the limits of this early colonization. A secondary nucleus grew in the area of Porto Pim, and infilling occurred sporadically until a crescent formed along the banks of the east coast, only contained by Ponte de Espalamaca to the north and open ocean to the south. The cinder cones in the south likely protected settlers and ships from the north Atlantic weather systems. Horta grew slowly into the river valleys of Faial's interior, linking the parishes of Flamengos to the west and Feteira to the southwest to form an incomplete urbanized mass. The nodes of growth basically follow the road network, including the recently completed "Scute" (freeway) that bypasses the southern E.R.1-1ª road between Angustias and Feteira.

== Twin towns — Sister cities ==
Horta is twinned with:

- New Bedford, Massachusetts, United States
- Fremont, California, United States
- Santa Cruz, Madeira, Portugal

== Economy ==
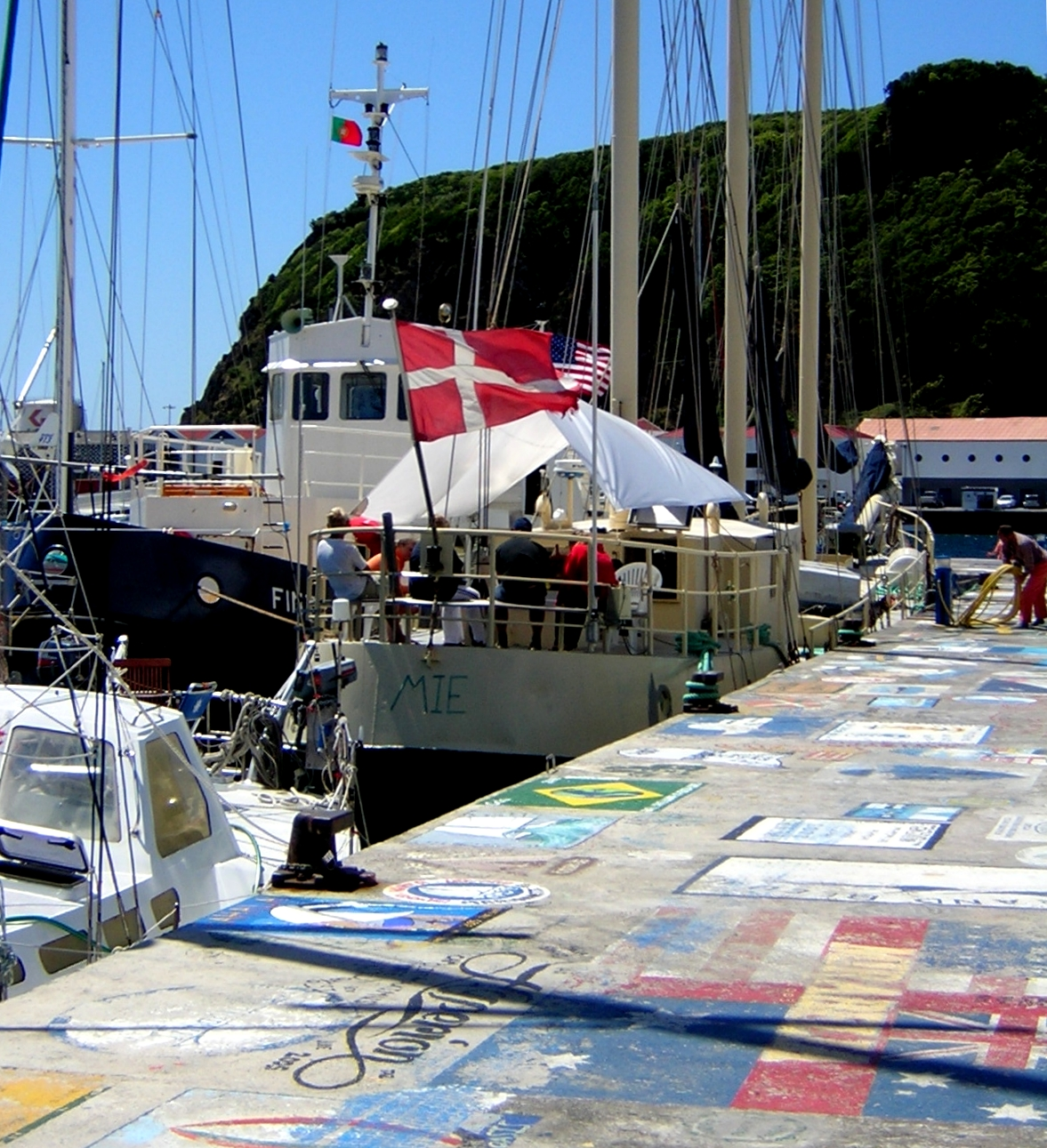
The pier and seawalls in Horta Harbor and Marina are covered with the "calling cards" of visiting yachts.

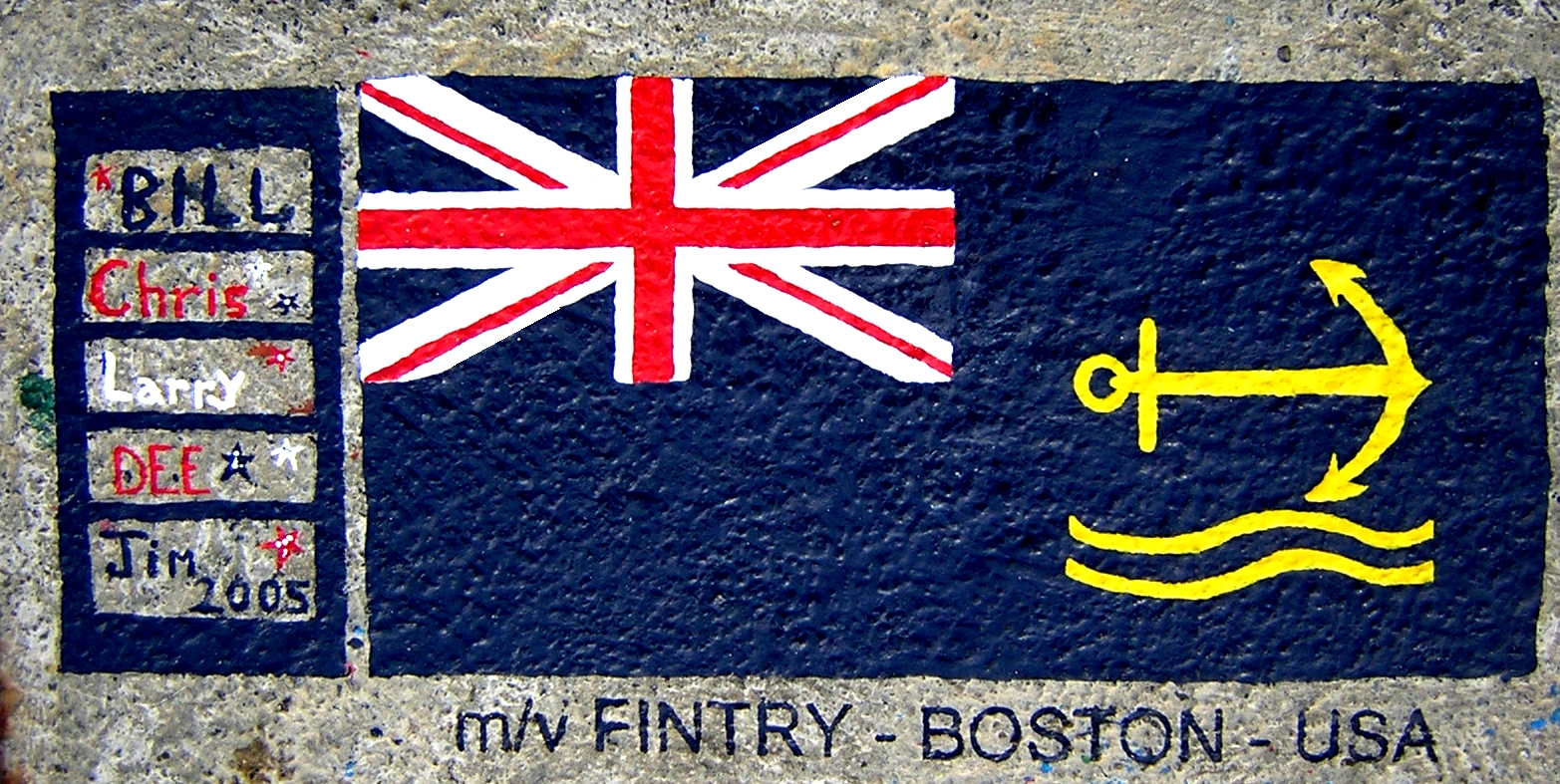
An example of one of the murals painted on the Marina seawall, showing the ensign of the Royal Maritime Auxiliary Service

Due to its central position in the Triangle of islands in the Azores's Central Group, Horta has been the focus of economic activity on Faial. It was the staging and export centre for many of the economic cycles of the region: the export of woad-derived dyes, oranges, whale oil, and Pico-grown Verdelho wines historically built Faial's economy. Many of the landed gentry concentrated their shops, production facilities, and homes in the city, while agricultural goods were shipped to the city before being sent on to Europe or North America. For a long time, the island of Pico was an exclave of Horta with summer homes, agricultural parcels, and herds owned by residents of Faial, until its emancipation on 8 March 1723.

After the failure of the economic cycles through boom-and-bust economies (brought on by weather, plant disease, or market deviation), the city of Horta became a staging point for transatlantic shipment firstly for whaling fleets, and later for the submarine cable companies that laid communication lines between Europe and North America. These spurts of growth concentrated the population and political and economic classes within Horta, and economic activities on Faial.

Horta today is polarized between the same dichotomy that existed between the hinter- and heartlands, with most primary economic activities (agricultural mostly) dispersed into the parishes, while the secondary and tertiary activities are concentrated in the three main parishes (Angústias, Conceição and Matriz). In addition, the prosperity of the early 20th century, concentrated on the transatlantic traffic, has developed into a tourist-oriented economy concentrated on the architecture, geographic, leisure, and sociocultural aspects of the island. This includes sightseeing tours and whale-watching expeditions departing from the city, the arrival of semi-weekly cruise ships during the summer, and cultural festivals that unite local residents and visitors throughout the year.

== Transportation ==
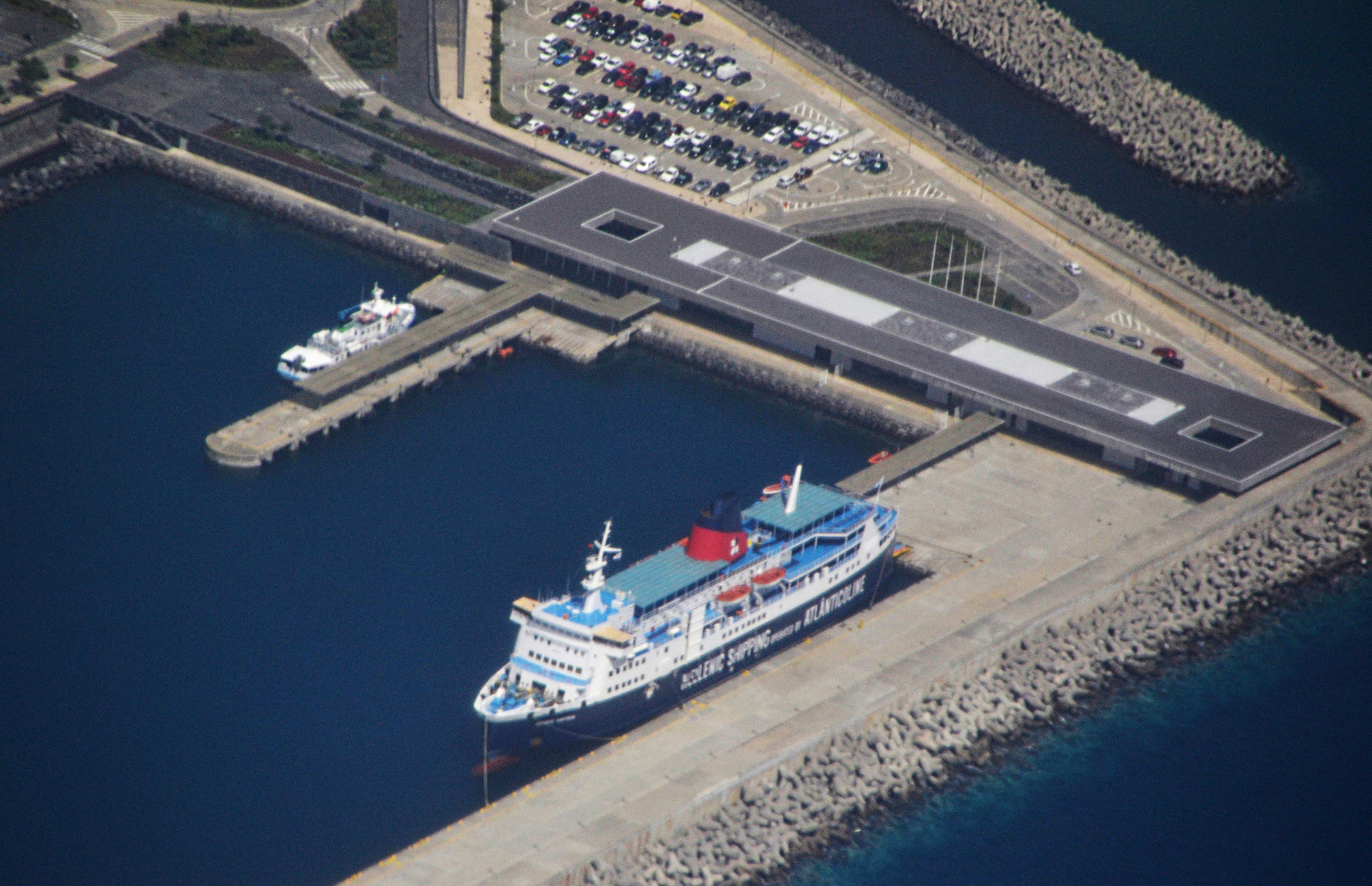
Aerial view of the port of Horta

The island is circled by the Regional E.R.1-1ª roadway which directly connects all parish centres (except Flamengos) with the city Horta. Apart from personal vehicles, a bus system provides daily access to the city from the outer parishes.

The centre of most activity in the municipality is Horta's port and passenger terminal which, until 28 July 2012, was located south of the Fort of Santa Cruz in the parish of Angustias. The passenger ferries operated by Transmaçor (the Cruzeiro do Canal and Cruzeiro da Ilha) provided passenger service to and from the island of Pico (Madalena), while Atlânticoline (using contracted ships) provided inter-island service to the remaining islands from the main dock across the harbour. On 28 July 2012, a new passenger ferry and dock was inaugurated across the harbour at the mouth of the Ribeira da Conceição across from the old District Courthouse. A €33 million project, the dock was started in 2009, and resulted in a 393-metre (1,289 ft) long wharf, with a 267-metre (876 ft) long by 80-metre (260 ft) wide usable docking space containing two ramps for roll-on/roll-off operation, with the express purpose of supporting passenger traffic within the triangle islands of the central Azores. A 130-metre (430 ft) long embankment 20,000 square metres (220,000 ft^{2}) in area was also built to protect the Ribeira da Conceição. The project involved changes to the road network in the area, parking areas, pavement and green-spaces, as well as new public illumination, water supply, telecommunications, and fueling resources. In addition to these improvements, Transmaçor acquired two new ships to be brought into service by the end of 2014 in order to support the island's tourist economy. At the new wharf's inauguration, President of the Azorean Regional Government Carlos Cesar indicated the importance of inter-island traffic for the islands, which for 16 years had transported 290,000 passengers annually (and now is beyond 400,000).

== In literature ==
The city contains the Horta Regional Museum which has a permanent exhibit, Exhibition of Capelinhos Volcano, detailing in photographs the 1957 volcanic eruption in the Azores. The museum also contains a large collection of scale models of buildings, ships, and people carved from fig kernels by Euclides Rosa.

Mark Twain visited Horta in June 1867 near the beginning of a long pleasure excursion to Jerusalem. He described his visit with acerbic commentary on the people and culture of Horta in his semi-autobiographical book The Innocents Abroad. In the book Twain compliments Horta's physical appearance:

"The town has eight thousand to ten thousand inhabitants. Its snow-white houses nestle cosily in a sea of fresh green vegetation, and no village could look prettier or more attractive. It sits in the lap of an amphitheatre of hills which are three hundred to seven hundred feet high, and carefully cultivated clear to their summits - not a foot of soil left idle."

However, Twain painted a less complimentary picture of the inhabitants of Horta and Faial at the time:

"The group on the pier was a rusty one — men and women, and boys and girls, all ragged, and barefoot, uncombed and unclean, and by instinct, education, and profession, beggars. They trooped after us, and never more, while we tarried in Fayal, did we get rid of them. We walked up the middle of the principal street, and these vermin surrounded us on all sides, and glared upon us; and every moment excited couples shot ahead of the procession to get a good look back, just as village boys do when they accompany the elephant on his advertising trip from street to street."

"The community is eminently Portuguese — that is to say, it is slow, poor, shiftless, sleepy, and lazy. There is a civil governor, appointed by the King of Portugal; and also a military governor, who can assume supreme control and suspend the civil government at his pleasure. [...] there is one assistant superintendent to feed the mill and a general superintendent to stand by and keep him from going to sleep...There is not a wheelbarrow in the land [...] There is not a modern plow in the islands, or a threshing-machine. All attempts to introduce them have failed. The good Catholic Portuguese crossed himself and prayed God to shield him from all blasphemous desire to know more than his father did before him. [...] The people lie, and cheat the stranger, and are desperately ignorant, and have hardly any reverence for their dead. The latter trait shows how little better they are than the donkeys they eat and sleep with."

Joshua Slocum, sailing the sloop Spray, stopped in Horta on the first leg of his solo global circumnavigation, which he chronicled in his 1899 book Sailing Alone Around the World. Jules Verne mentioned Horta in his fictional tales.

In works by Portuguese writers Vitorino Nemésio (O Corsário das Ilhas) and Raul Brandão (As ilhas Desconhecidas), Faial is a focus of the story.

== Notable citizens ==
- Manuel de Arriaga (1840-1917), the first President of Portugal
- Maria Branco (1842–1887), Azorean midwife from Horta for the Dabney family
- Euclides Rosa (Horta, Azores; c.1910 - São Paulo, Brazil c. 1979), engineer and artist, who worked for one of the early telegraph cable companies at the turn of the century, until 1946, when he abandoned his job to become an artist. Recognized as the Mestre do "Miolo de Figueira" (Master of Fig Tree Pith) he was acclaimed for his complex and elaborate sculptures of pith/wood, with a permanent collection in the Museum of Horta (donated in 1980).

== Sources ==
- Abdo, Joseph C. (2005). On the Edge of History. Lisbon, Portugal: Tenth Island Editions/Joseph C. Abdo Unipessoal, Lda. ISBN 972-99858-0-4.
- Bento, Carlos Melo (2008), História dos Açores: Da descoberta a 1934 (in Portuguese), Ponta Delgada (Azores), Portugal: Câmara Municipal de Ponta Delgada
