= Feteira (Horta) =

- Civil parish
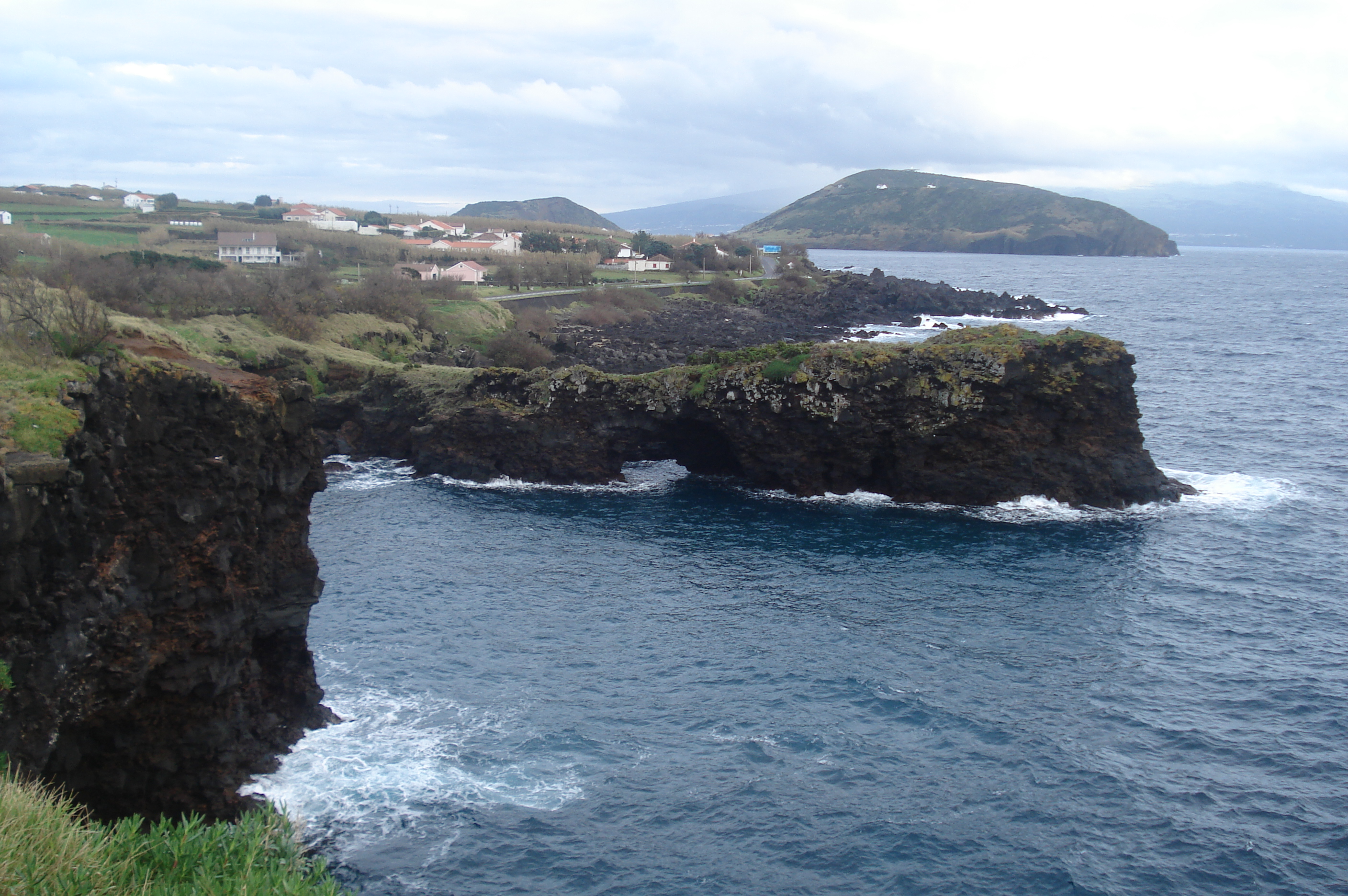
- The coast of Feteira, showing the rocky cliffs and vista of Monte da Guia (to the east), Faial Island

- Location of the civil parish of Feteira within the municipality of Horta
- Coordinates: 38°31′36″N 28°40′33″W
- Country: Portugal
- Auton. region: Azores
- Island: Faial
- Municipality: Horta
- Established: Settlement: fl. 1562; Parish: 30 June 1568

Area
  - Total: 14.46 km^{2} (5.58 sq mi)

Population (2011)
  - Total: 1,899
  - Density: 131.3/km^{2} (340.1/sq mi)
- Time zone: UTC−01:00 (AZOT)
  - Summer (DST): UTC+00:00 (AZOST)
- Postal code: 9900-361
- Area code: 292
- Patron: Divino Espírito Santo
- Website: http://www.feteira.com/

Feteira (Portuguese: [fɨ.ˈtɐj.ɾɐ]) is a civil parish in the southern part of the municipality of Horta, on the island of Faial in the Portuguese archipelago of the Azores. The population in 2011 was 1,899, in an area of 14.46 km^{2}. It occupies the southern foothills of the Caldeira Volcano, along the coast. The name Feteira is derived from the Portuguese word for "fern", and indicates a "location of [many] ferns"; the name likely refers to the original colonists' discovery of this area covered with ferns.

== History ==
The early inhabitants colonized the area around Ribeira da Granja, along the coast near Lajinha and Ponta Furada. They built their first community along the coast, although on higher ground.

The Church of Feteira, consecrated in honor of the Holy Spirit, is one of the older churches on the island. Lost to history, its date of construction is currently unknown, although the first references to the sanctuary refer to 1562. In that Year, the local residents were forced to pay higher taxes to the parish. On June 30, 1568, King D. Sebastião passed a provision in favor of People of Feteira who sought the Crown's intervention. Relating to its church, the historian Gaspar Frutuoso mentioned that it had three naves, supported by five columns, with arterial chapels on either side. It was a temple of good proportions (35 m in width) with a single bell-tower. The parish also had a nearby 15th century chapel dedicated to Saint Peter. In 1597, it was sacked and burned by English pirates. The chapel was a place of pilgrimage and popular religious festivities. Due to lack of attention and care, over time it was abandoned. Because of a history of piracy, there were small forts along the rugged coastline for the protection of the residents. They were part of an overall system of defenses around the island of Fayal, which suffered most of the time from lack of sufficient manpower and artillery. These fortified outposts decayed with time and the erosive action of the sea and tempests. Today, the ruins of these defensive positions have disappeared.

Following economic and social hardship in 1862, and weakness of political leaders to satisfy their demands, an uprising occurred in 1862 in several of the island's towns over the imposition of new taxes. The people of Feteirs adhered to the protests.

== Geography ==
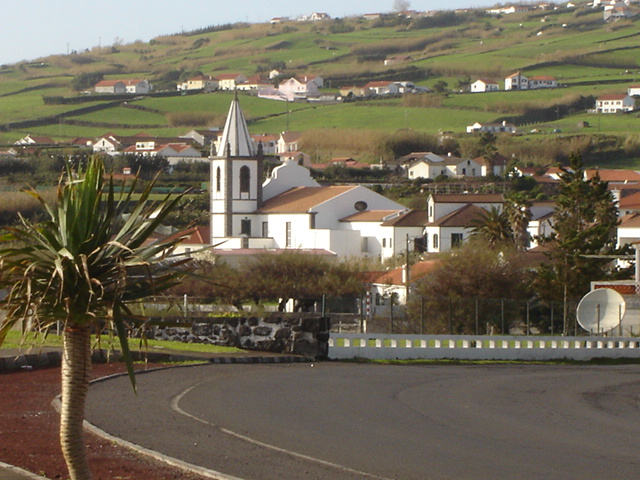
Feteira's village center, known sometimes as Feteira de Baixo, along the eastern border with Angústias

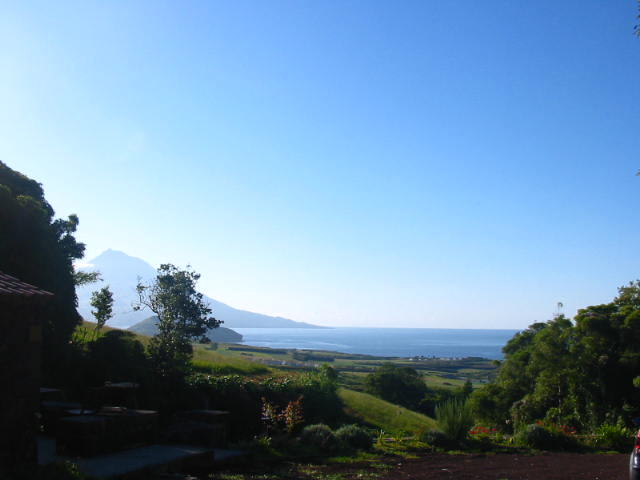
The southern coast of Faial as seen from the foothills of Feteira, with the summit of Pico in the east

It is located 5 kilometres (3.1 mi) west of the center of the city of Horta, connected by the southern extension of the regional E.R.1-1ª roadway and a northern municipal road in the interior. Farmlands dominate the coastal plain between the neighbouring parishes of Angústias and Castelo Branco, while the coast is a rocky area formed by rugged lava stones and cliffs undercut by the Atlantic Ocean. The highest point in the parish is the peak of Cangueiro, approximately 706 metres (2,316 ft) above sea level, below the crater rim of Cabeço Gordo. The coastal cliffs, which mark the southern border of the town, are at most 61 metres (200 ft) above sea level. Lava flows formed intricate geomorphological structures, highlighted by the area of Lajinha (on the eastern border). Wave motion and currents have carved this region forming coastal arches, and undercutting the E.R. 1-1ª at points near the Rua da Além.

Intermittent creeks and small seasonal streams bisect the parish., supporting the growth of various settlements and neighbourhoods, involved inagriculture, including (from west to east): Ribeira do Granjo, Ribeira do São Pedro and Ribeira de Fonte do Rego. Five bridges cross these water courses at São Pedro, Porceirão, Igreja, a second one in São Pedro (at the lower part of the parish) and Ponte Nova.

Bisected by these natural barriers, the parish developed in various nuclei associated with the roads and pathways that interconnected the pasturelands and woodlots along the flanks of the Cabeço Gordo volcano. Consequently, small neighbourhoods or communities developed along: the regional roadway (that included Feteira de Baixo, Caminho do Meio and Alto da Lajinha), another route that connected Feteira to Flamengos (that included Cruz da Portela, Caminho das Terças and Lameiro Grande), a second lateral road that included Farrobim do Sul and intersected the interior towards Flamengos (that included Cimo de São Pedro, Atalaia, Grotas, Fonte do Rego and Cimo do Granjo), and a roadway that bisected these arterials starting in Angústias (from Courelas, across Cruz da Portela, to Portela and Grotas, to Fonte do Rego).

== Economy ==
Agriculture is the primary source of income. Historically, the parish has cultivated potatoes, supported orange and lemon orchards, as well as large quantities of wheat and corn. Documents for 1886 indicate a cultivation of 200,000 kilograms (440,000 lb) of potatoes. Most of these crops were cultivated for export, although small itinerant banana fields were cultivated for local consumption. These continue to important crops, but currently, the cattle and dairy industry is generally accepted as the primary source of agro-business (although some lambs are raised).

The fishery and paper industries have also supported the local economy. Yet, economic difficulties, in particular regional politics, have seen a decrease in people participating in these activities, since 1862.

== Architecture ==
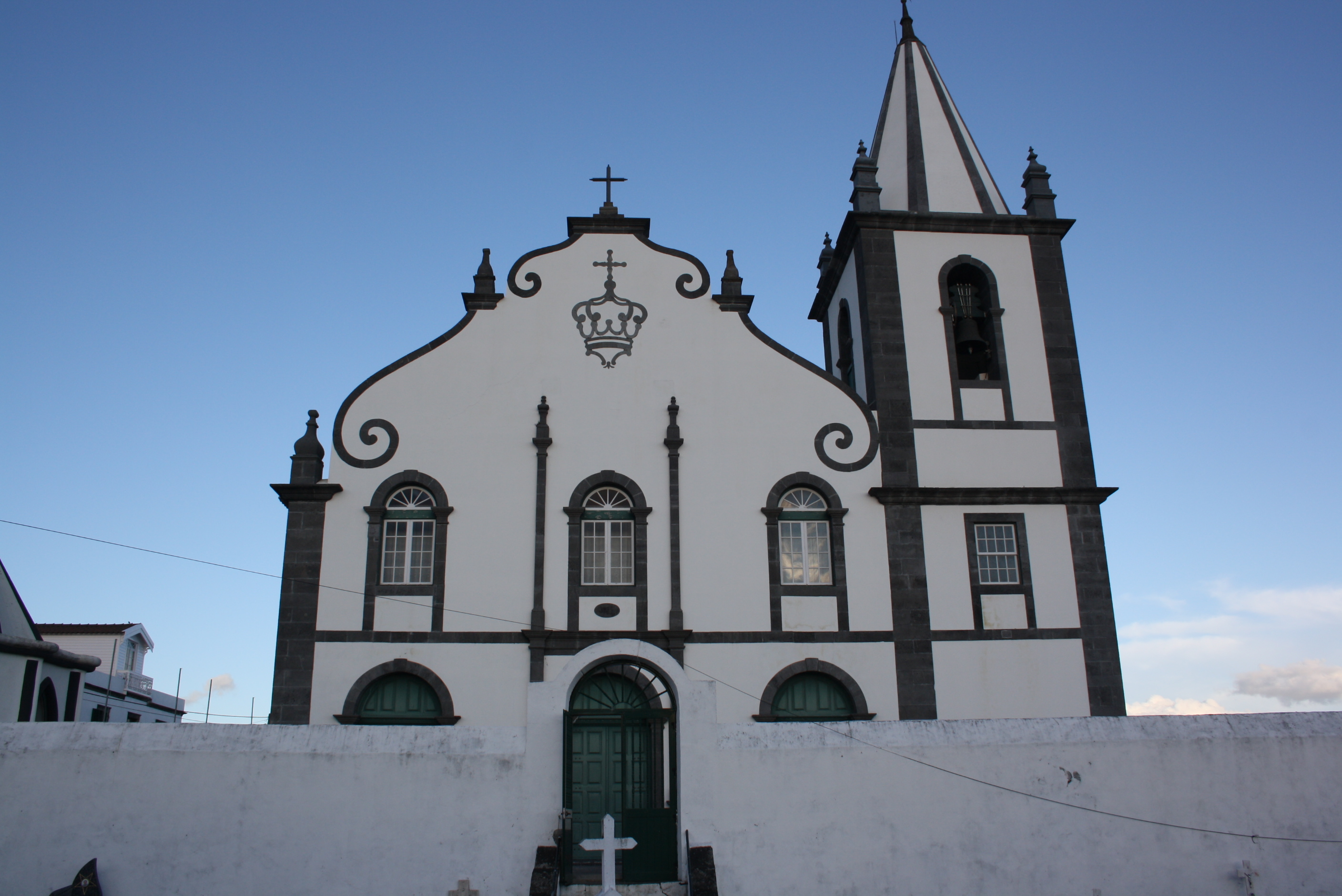
The front facade of the parochial church of Feteira, dedicated to the Holy Spirit

=== Civic ===
- Hayloft on Rua das Courelas (Portuguese: Palheiro - Às Courelas)
- Residence on Estrada Regional E.R.1-1ª (Portuguese: Casa de Habitação - Estrada Regional)
- Residence on Rua da Engenhaira (Portuguese: Casa de Habitação - Rua da Engenhaira)
- Residences on Rua da Igreja (Portuguese: Casa de Habitação - Rua da Igreja)
- Residence/Shop on Rua da Igreja (Portuguese: Casa de Habitação e Comércio - Rua da Igreja)
- Residence on Rua das Courelas (Portuguese: Casa de Habitação - Rua das Courelas)
- Ribeira da Granja Tidal Pool (Portuguese: Poço de Maré à Ribeira da Granja)
- Rural Residence on Algar (Portuguese: Casa de Habitação ao Algar)
- Twin Residences on Rua da Igreja (Portuguese: Casas de Habitação Geminadas - Rua da Igreja)
- Windmill of Algar (Portuguese: Moinho de Vento ao Algar)
- Windmill of Cruz da Portela Portuguese: Moinho de Vento da Cruz da Portela)

=== Religious ===
- Church of the Divine Holy Spirit (Portuguese: Igreja Paroquial das Feteira/Igreja do Divino Espírito Santo)
- Former Parish Rectory/Residence (Portuguese: Passal da Feteira)

There are approximately 37 impérios or religious structures to honour the Holy Spirit on the island, of these seven are located in the civil parish. Some, like the Império das Grotas in Feteira, date back to the 19th century (1898 specifically), have been susceptible to a change in the islands demographics, economics and agnosticism, and slowly abandoned due to local disinterest.

== Culture ==
In addition to the feast days associated with the Holy Spirit, there are other religious and secular events that mark the annual calendar, including the feast day of Our Lady of Lourdes (Portuguese: Nossa Senhora de Lourdes), which is held on the last weekend of August.
