= Angústias =

- Civil parish
- The urbanized area of Angústias, alongside Monte Escuro and Monte da Guia, showing the bay of Porto Pim

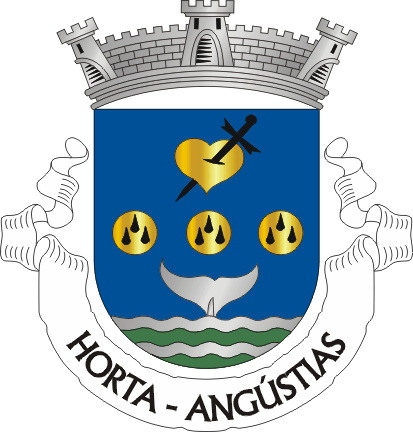
- Coat of arms

- Location of the civil parish of Angústias within the municipality of Horta
- Coordinates: 38°31′41″N 28°37′38″W
- Country: Portugal
- Auton. region: Azores
- Island: Faial
- Municipality: Horta
- Established: Settlement: c. 1468-1499; Parish: c. 1664; Civil parish: 28 November 1684

Area
  - Total: 3.79 km^{2} (1.46 sq mi)
- Elevation: 11 m (36 ft)

Population (2011)
  - Total: 2,418
  - Density: 638/km^{2} (1,650/sq mi)
- Time zone: UTC−01:00 (AZOT)
  - Summer (DST): UTC+00:00 (AZOST)
- Postal code: 9960-040
- Area code: 292
- Patron: Nossa Senhora das Angústias
- Website: http://www.cmhorta.pt

Angústias (pronounced [ɐ̃.ˈguʃ.ti.ɐʃ]) is one of the three freguesias ("civil parishes") that comprise the urban area of the city of Horta, on the island of Faial in the Portuguese archipelago of the Azores. This is an economically active, densely populated area. The population in 2011 was 2,418, in an area of 3.79 km^{2}. Due to its commercial nature, the parish is one of the island's primary destinations for tourism, due to the concentration of historical sights and shopping. It contains the localities Caminho do Meio, Courelas, Pasteleiro, Port Pim, Termo da Igreja and Vigia.

== History ==
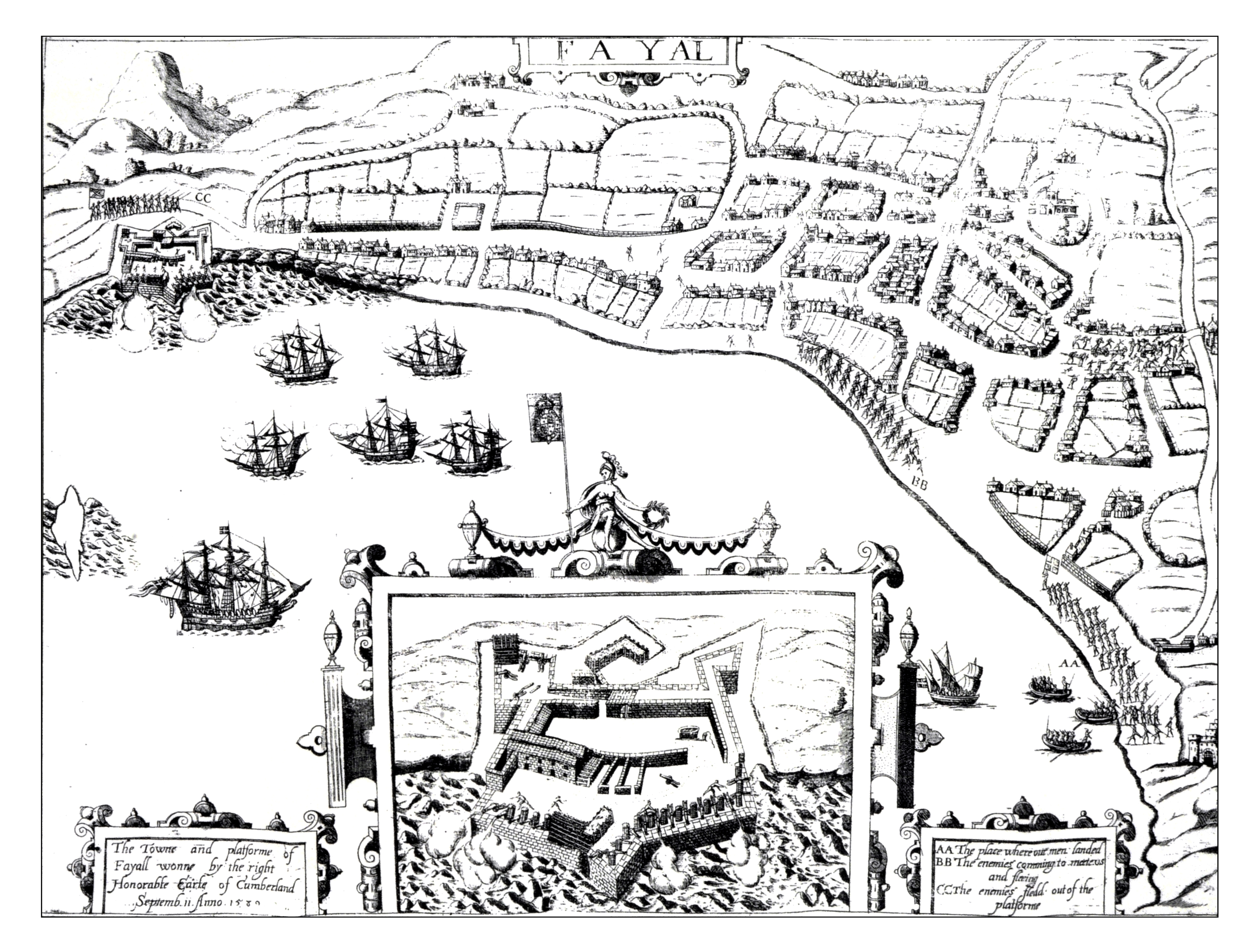
Image of the Horta Bay, as seen through the eyes of the Earl of Cumberland (16th Century)

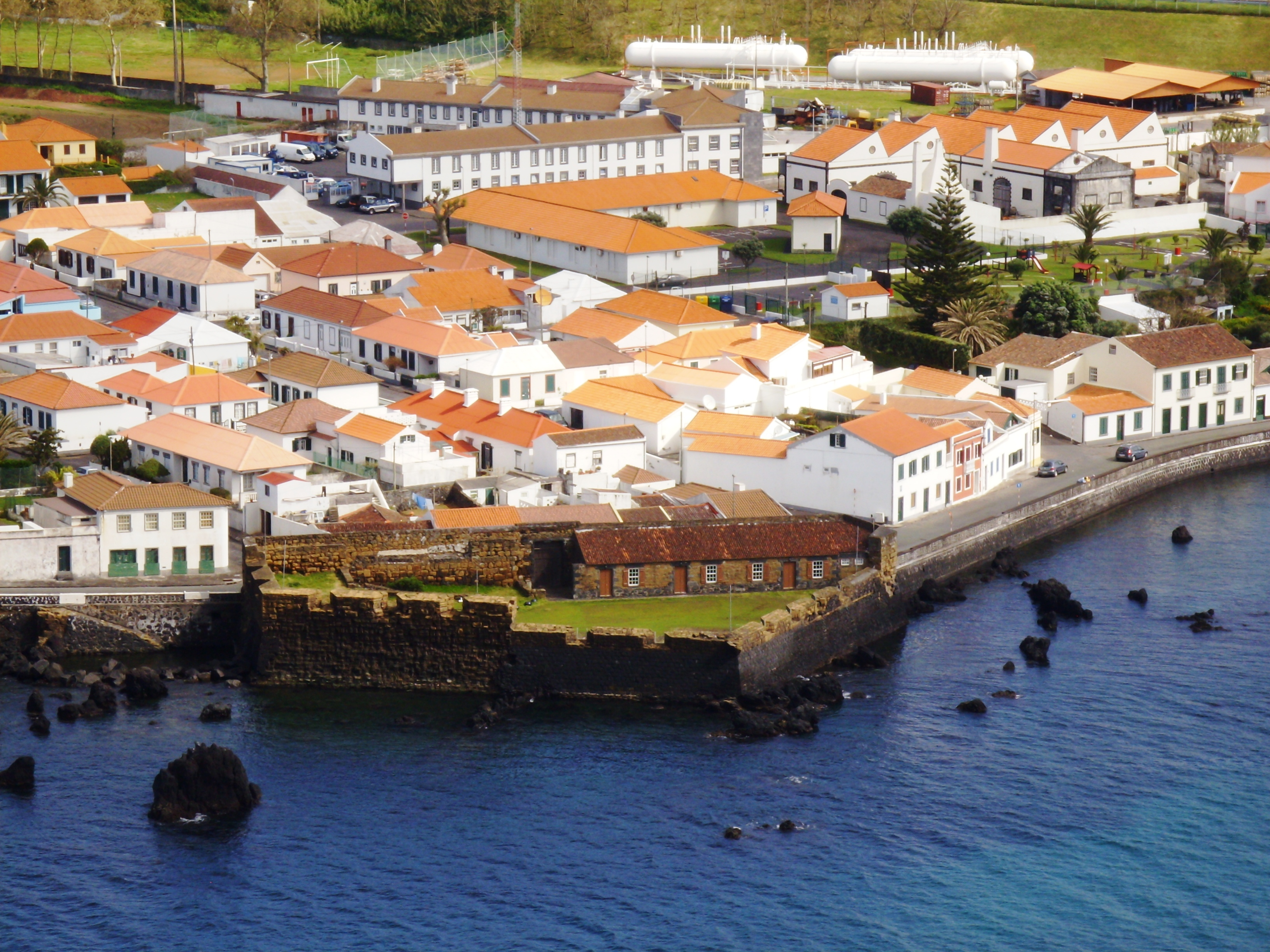
Fort of São Sebastião, at one time a military fortification that protected the ships in Porto Pim harbor

The first recorded reference to settlers in the area of Angústias referred to the Portuguese: Vila de Orta (in 1532). Since 1468, the island and parish had been under the administration of Josse van Huerter, a Flemish leader during the early colonization of the island of Faial. The settlement and growth of the village of Orta (later Horta) was concentrated in two nuclei: an interior settlement in the valley of Flamengos and the southwestern religious parish of Nossa Senhora das Angústias (English: Our Lady of Anguish).

Several smaller agglomerations developed within the area of Angústias. Porto Pim, a sheltered bay between Monte Escuro and Monte da Guia, became a natural refuge for the first colonists, where they could easily load and unload cargo and supplies. Along the southern coast, the area of Pasteleiro, became the site of the first commercial businesses associated with the pastel or woad industry (first started by van Huerter). On the western edge of Horta Bay, the first homes were constructed, around the small chapel of Santa Cruz (where Josse van Huerter and his wife, Beatriz de Macedo, were buried).

In 1567, the Fort of Santa Cruz was built for the defense of the island. Unfortunately, these fortifications, the convents and many of the churches, were sacked by English privateers in 1589 and 1597, and the buildings burned to the ground. By the beginning of the 17th century, several new military/defensive structures were built in order to protect the growing community, including the Military Doors of Porto Pim (Portuguese: Portões Miltares do Porto Pim), the Fort of São Sebastião (Portuguese: Forte de São Sebastião), the Fort of Greta (Portuguese: Forte de Greta), and the Fort of Nossa Senhora da Guia (Portuguese: Forte de Nossa Senhora da Guia).

The Chapel of Santa Bárbara (Portuguese: Ermida de Santa Bárbara) was later constructed in Angústias by the Flemish nobleman Pero Pasteleiro and his wife Madelana da Rosa.

Originally completed in 1522, through the initiative of Friar Pedro da Atouguia, the Convent of São Francisco (Portuguese: Convento de São Francisco) was originally built on a site called Pedras dos Frades (along the coastal boulevard where a compass rose was constructed in the 20th Century). It was sacked and set ablaze in 1597 by English privateers, later destroyed during a storm, after being re-constructed in 1609. A third convent and church was re-constructed in 1696 on higher ground and farther away from the coast. On November 12, 1700, it was reconsecrated as the Church of Our Lady of the Rosary (Portuguese: Igreja da Nossa Senhora do Rosário). Its principal benefactor, Simão Liuz Carolo, was moved from Angra do Heroísmo to a mausoleum in the main chapel on the 4 November 1700. With the end of the religious orders in 1835, the convent was donated to the Santa Casa da Misericórdia, which installed its hospital and Asilo de Mendicidade. On 4 May 1899, a violent fire completely destroyed the convent: the Church survived.

The civil parish of Nossa Senhora das Angústias was formed on 28 November 1684. Frair Lourenço, Bishop of Angra, on 30 August 1675, finally initiated the construction of a church in the name of Santa Cruz. In 1688, after a visit of Bishop Clemente Vieria, the parish received 572$000 réis for the construction. It would eventually be constructed in 1800 and receive the name Church of Nossa Senhora das Angústias: its bell-towers were finished in 1861.

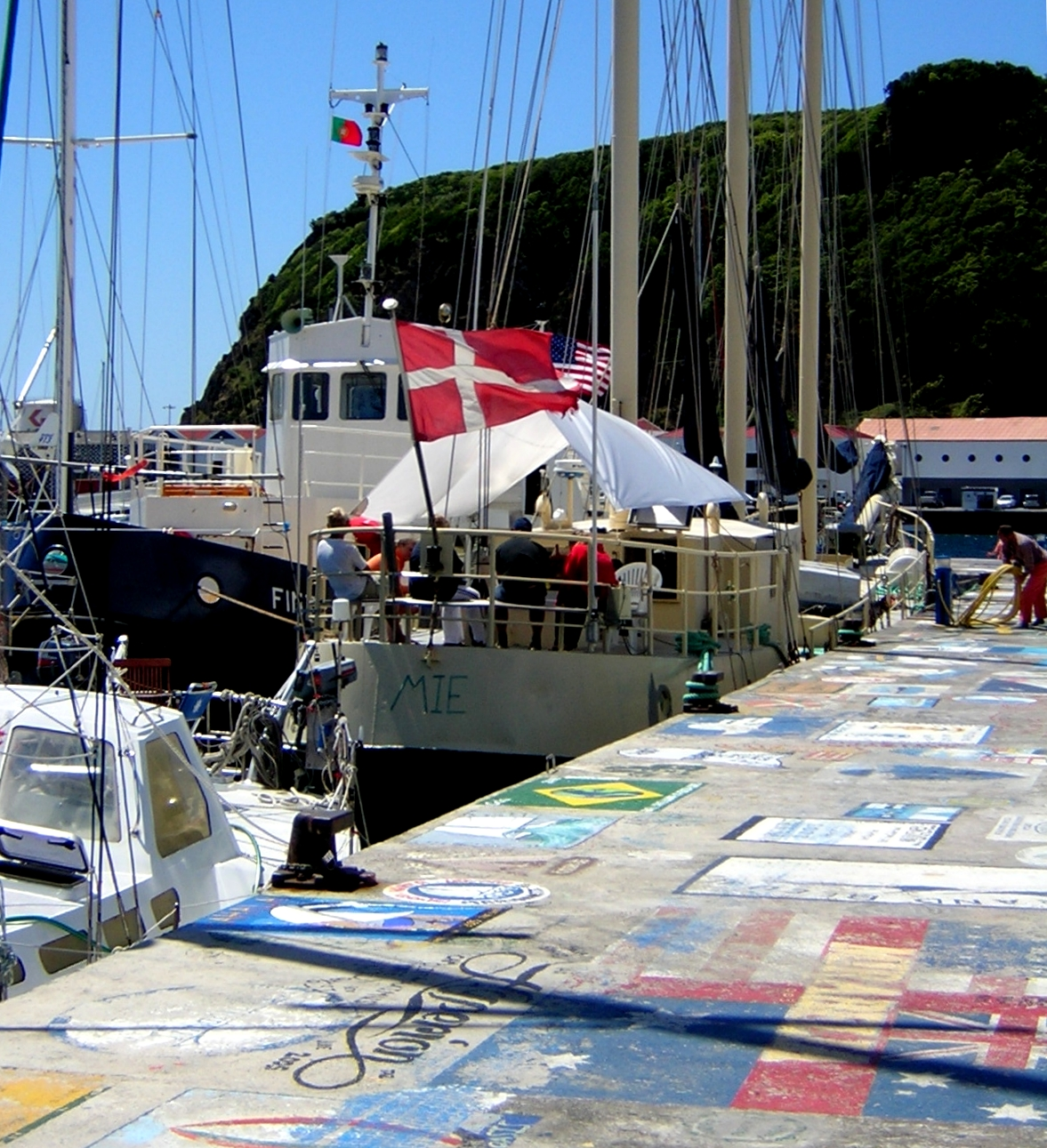
Yacht Calling Cards

Between 1839 and 1969, due to the developments in the telegraph industries, Horta (and Angústias in particular) was the central node in the trans-Atlantic submarine cable network. The basing of English, American and German telegraph companies in Angústias resulted in urban and social growth. Many of the buildings constructed during this period have become integral to the landscape of the parish, including the Hotel Faial, the homes and businesses of the Dabney family, the Colonia Alemã and several of the original buildings constructed to house the telegraph equipment.

By October 20, 1876, the commercial port was constructed; it became an important trans-Atlantic point, as an Allied port during both World Wars, a stopover for hydroplanes crossing the Atlantic and way-point for Dutch Atlantic tugboats. In the early years, the dock came to supplement, then supplant, the harbor of Porto Pim for whaling vessels involved in the North Atlantic whale hunt. A new marina was eventually inaugurated (June 3, 1986) to handle the annual growth in yachts and pleasure craft to the region. The marina is celebrated in yachting circles for the hundreds of yacht calling cards painted on the walks and walls by visiting crews.

== Geography ==
=== Physical geography ===
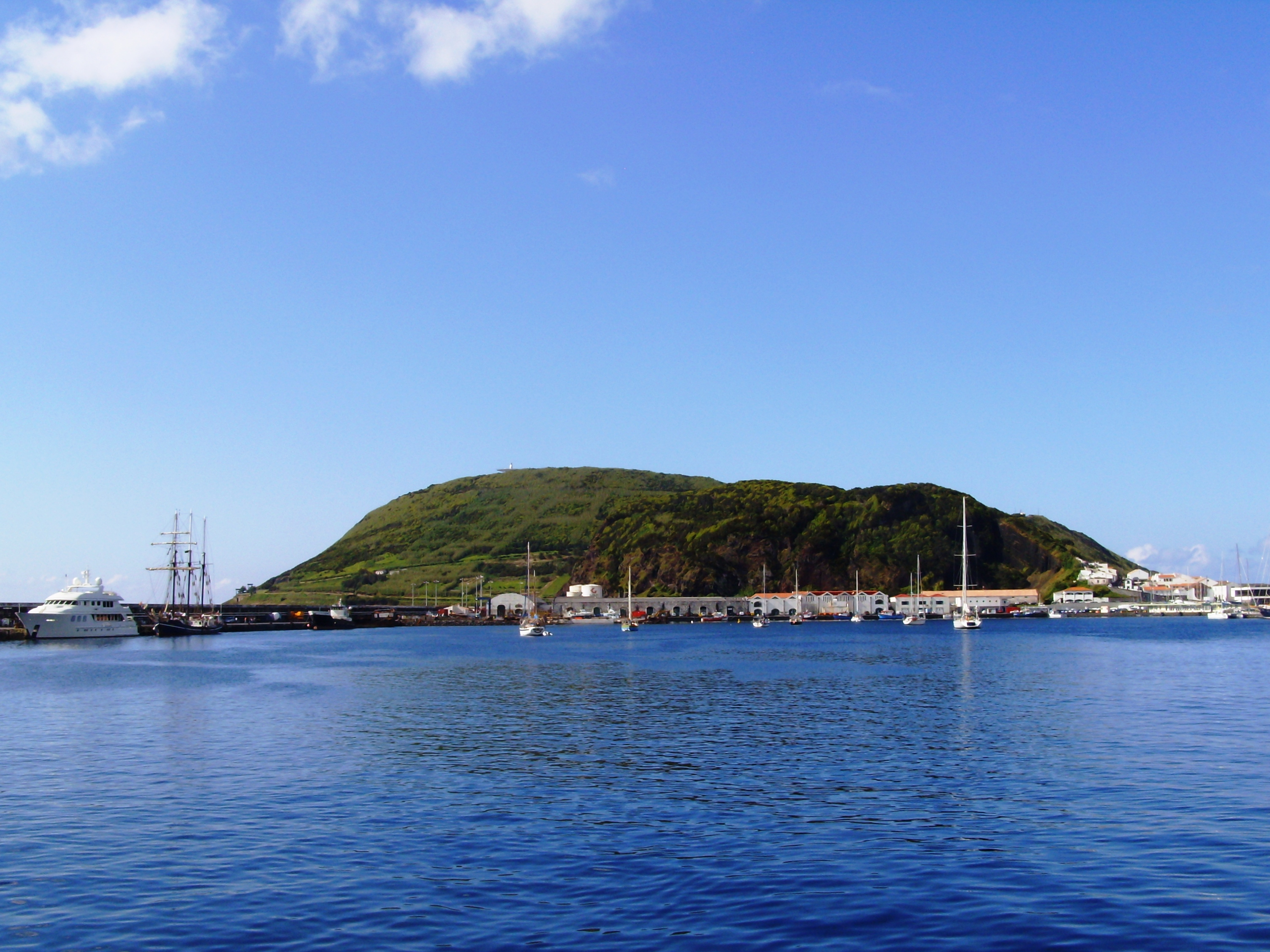
Overlapping mountains: Monte Escuro (foreground) and Monte da Guia (background) as seen from the harbour in Horta

This urbanized parish's northern border begins at the Horta Marina, and crosses through commercial buildings to the Ramp do São Francisco and alongside the Santa Casa da Misericórdia (the Rua da Santa Casa) before intersecting the property-line of the former Dabney residence The Cedars, following the Rua Luís de Camões, until intersecting at Rua da Ilha do Pico. From this point the border follows Rua Ilha do Pico until Rua do Moínho, where it skirts Monte Carneiro until reaching the border with Flamengos. The western border follows Calço da Fugeuira for several metres before extending westerly into the pasturelands of Pasteleiro, where it plunges south through the industrial zone, crossing the Via-Rápida and the Rua do Lajinho until reaching the sea. The parish encompasses an area that extends from the civil parish of Feteiras along the southern coast of Faial, to the port area of the city of Horta. It includes the bay of Port Pim, Monte da Guia and Monte Escuro, and a small portion of Monte Carneiro. It is fronted on the north by the civil parish of Matriz and Flamengos, while completely surrounded on all other borders by the Atlantic Ocean.

The parish is part of the Horta-Flamengos-Feteira geomorphological zone referred to as the Horta Platform localized along the southeast portion of the island, and characterized by a low altitude, smooth relief created from several lava flow covers. The area includes many Strombolian cones (including Monte Carneiro), in addition to the Monte da Guia Tuff Surtseyan cone. These volcanic cones are linked together by smoothly planed areas which consist of lava flows with pumice or sedimentary materials.

==== Ecoregions/protected areas ====
Sections of the Nature Park of Faial are included within the boundaries of the civil parish, including:

- Nature Reserve of the Caldeirinhas (Portuguese: Reserva Natural das Caldeirinhas), totally surrounded by the Monte da Guia landscape, the special nature reserve of Caldeirinhas refers to the internal crater open to the southern ocean at the base of Monte da Guia;
- Protected Area for the Management of Resources of the Faial-Pico Channel (Portuguese: Área Protegida de Gestão de Recursos do Canal Faial-Pico/Sector Faial), is a protected zone that covers the southwestern corner of Faial and across to Pico, hugging the coast along Angustias, but also the adjacent parishes of Feteira, Matriz, Conceição, Praia de Almoxarife, Pedro Miguel and Ribeirinha;
- Protected Landscape of Monte da Guia (Portuguese: Área de Paisagem Protegida do Monte da Guia), this protected landscape comprises most of the southeastern portion of the parish, covering an area of about 73 hectares, that includes the cinder cones Monte Queimado and Monte da Guia, as well as the isthmus that connects the two structures (referred to as Entre-Montes) forming the beach of Porto Pim.

Also within the borders of Angústias is the cinder cone of Monte Carneiro, to the west, along its frontier with the parish of Flamengos. The hilltop is the highest elevation in the parish, with views to the urbanized area of Horta.

=== Human geography ===
This is a hilly area that includes several slag/spatter cones (the aforementioned Monte da Guia, Monte Escuro and Monte Carneiro are all extinct cones), as well as rugged coastal areas and public sand beaches (the beach at Porto Pim). The area includes several pasture-lands but is generally urbanized, with an industrial area located in the west along an ancillary branch of the Regional E.R.2-1^{a} motorway, a residential neighbourhood along the southwest coast, and portion of the central city of Horta in the northeast coast. Along with the main Regional E.R.1-1^{a} roadway, which follows the coast from the marina to Feteiras, the Regional E.R.2-2^{a} variant (Estrada Príncipe Alberto do Mónaco-Estrada Regional de Santa Bárbara) extends from the intersection at the Church of Nossa Senhora das Angústias northwest to Flamengos, while the expressway (the Via-Rápida) to Feteiras begins at a traffic circle around the locality of Santa Bárbara.

Many of the important civic, cultural or regional buildings are located in Angústias, including the islands only secondary school (EBS Escola Secundária Manuel Arriaga), the only hospital (Portuguese: Hospital da Horta) on the island, the headquarters of the police, the commercial marina, dock and container terminal, the principal installations of the Santa Casa da Misericórdia (the benevolent society that homes the elderly) and the supermarket (Modelo). It also includes historical portions of the village of Orta, including the main commercial and residential buildings that formed the community in the late 19th century.

== Economy ==
While the western part of the parish is utilized as pasturelands, or for cultivation, the urbanized nature of the eastern part has concentrated on tertiary and municipal services. The Industrial Zone of Santa Barbara between the Via-Rápida and Rua das Courelas is the main secondary nucleus of industrial activity, in addition to the commercial container and fishing port along the eastern coast of Faial.

== Architecture ==
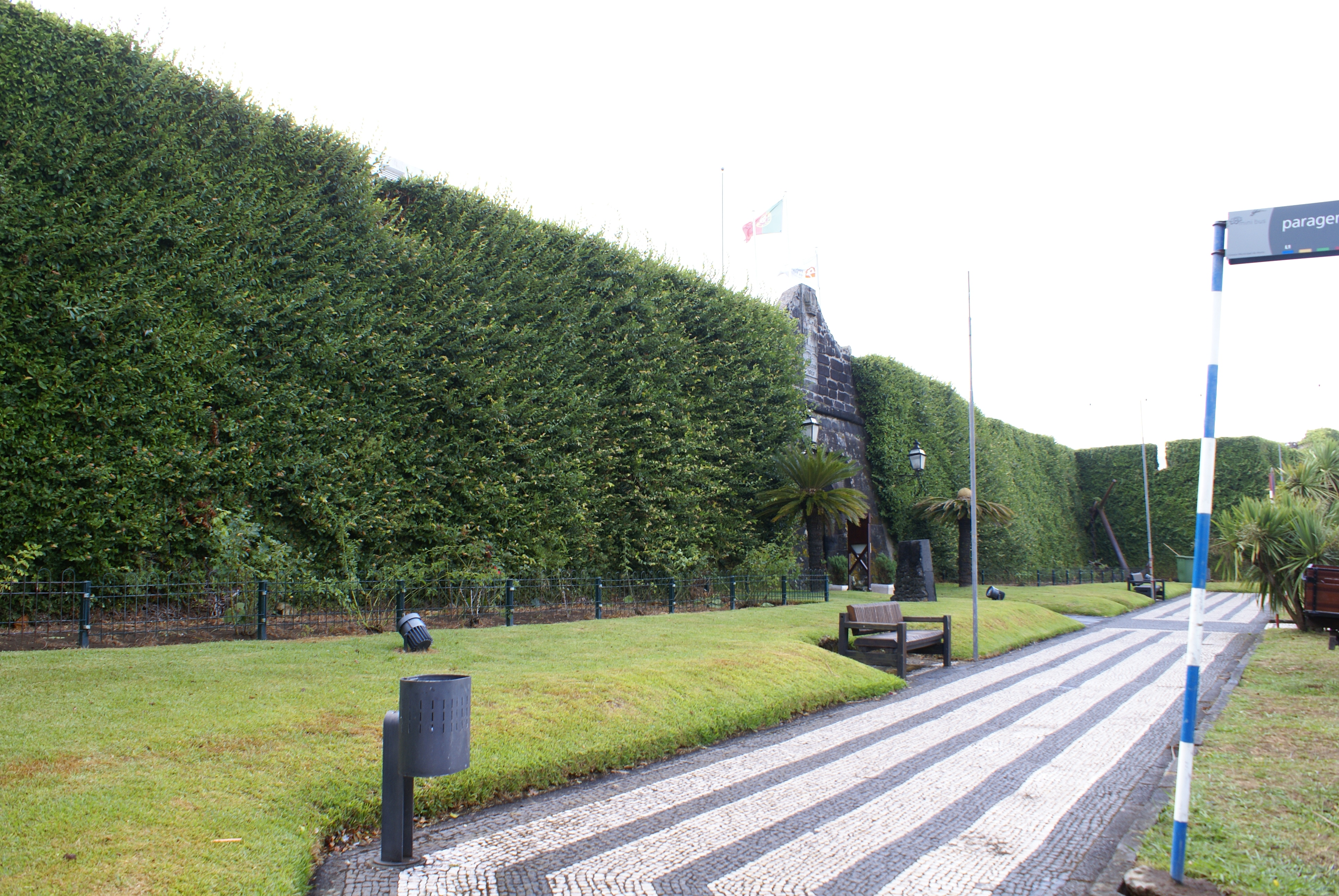
The front facade of the Fort of Santa Cruz used in the defence of the harbour

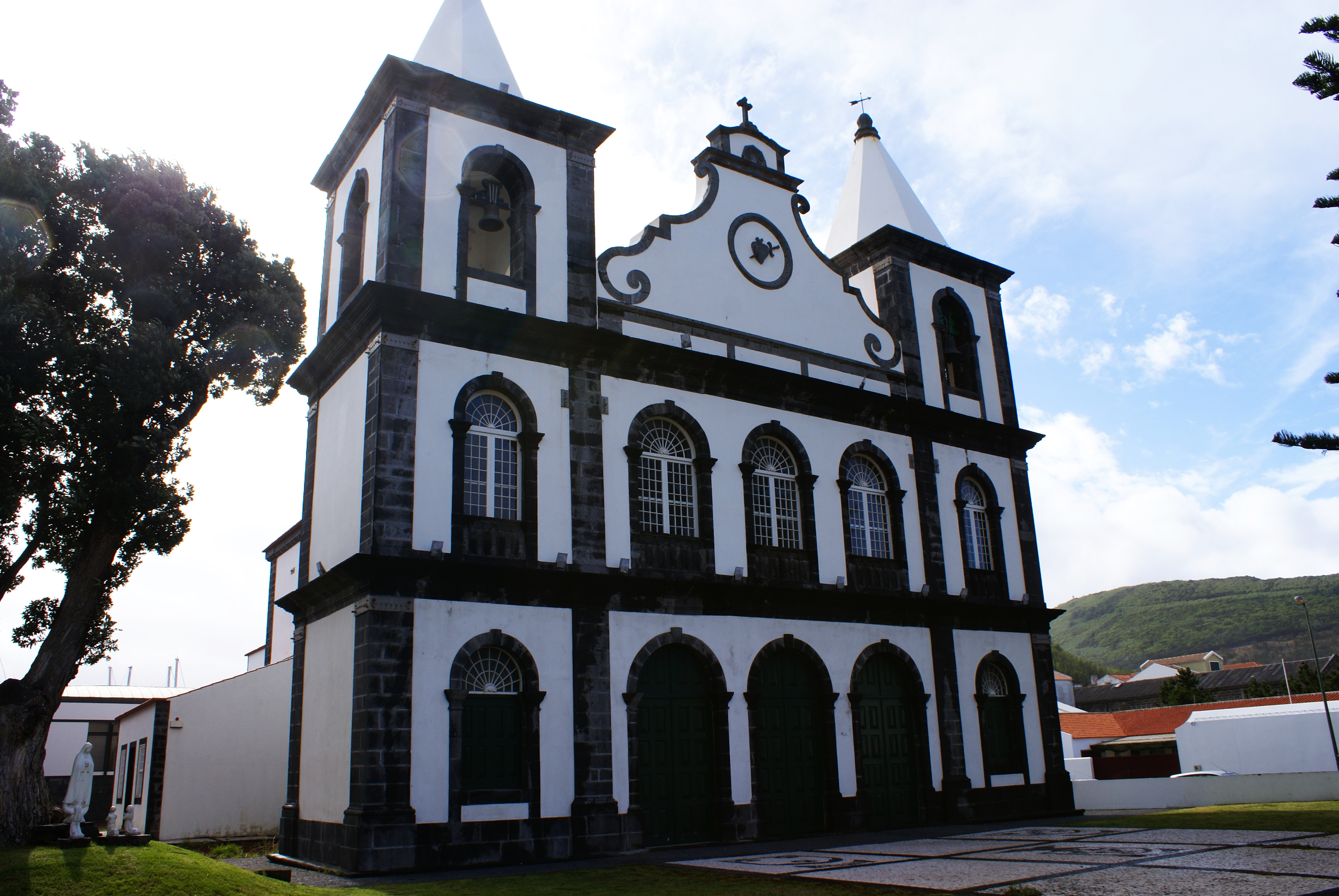
The Church of Angústias, site of the first chapel and resting place of the founders of Horta

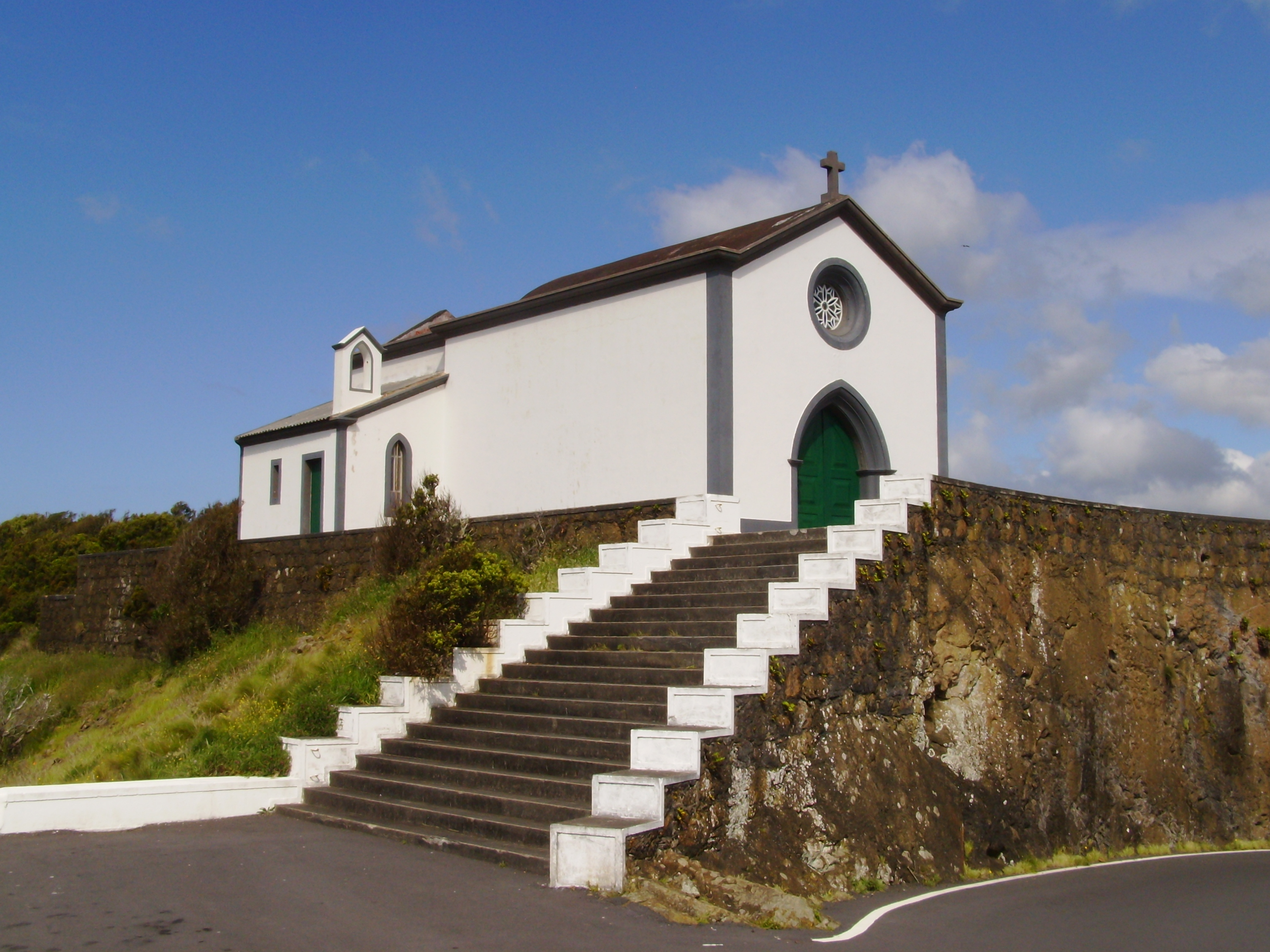
Chapel of Nossa Senhora da Guia, the hermitage on the volcanic cone of Monte da Guia

Being one of the nuclei of the city of Horta, Angústias is the home of many buildings important to the history of the region. Some of these have been renovated and reused for other purposes (for example the Fort of Santa Cruz), while others have become important as tourist attractions (for example Peter's Cafe) or continued to be active in the community (such as the Church of Nossa Senhora das Angústias).

=== Civic ===
- Captaincy of the Port of Horta (Portuguese: Capitania do Porto da Horta), part of the security and economic fiscalization of imports/exports, the Art-Deco style building located across from Cais de Santa Cruz is classified a Property of Public Interest;
- German Colonial Estate (Portuguese: Colónia Alemã)
- Hospital of Horta (Portuguese: Hospital da Horta), the corporatist structure, which symbolizes the utilitarian manner of its construction was defined on 20 April 1946, but only executed as of 30 April 1946 under the Comissão de Construções Hospitalares (Hospital Construction Commission).
- Naval Club of Horta (Portuguese: Clube Naval da Horta)
- Peter Café Sport (and Scrimshaw Museum), a landmark in the world of ocean navigation, the bar, cafe and museum is a historical reference in the Azores for whalers and yachtsmen travelling the Atlantic Ocean;
- Porto Pim Whale Factory Museum (Portuguese: Fábrica da Baleia na baía do Porto Pim/Fábrica da Baleia e Centro do Mar), constructed at the height of the whaling industry in the Atlantic, the factory was an initiative of several partners, who hoped to capitalize on the value of whale oil. The factory continued to produce whale oil and process byproducts from the carcasses of cetaceans captured off the coast of the central group.
- Prince Albert of Monaco Meteorological Observatory (Portuguese: Observatório Principio Alberto de Monaco)
- Public Library and Regional Archive (Portuguese: Biblioteca Pública e Arquivo Regional da Horta)
- Residence of the Arriaga Family (Portuguese: Casa dos Arriagas) - remodelled in 2010–2011, the former childhood family home of the first President of Portugal Manuel Arriaga, the Casa das Florinhas (House of the Small Flowers) was scheduled to open in 2011;
- Residence of the Dabney Family The Cedars (Portuguese: Casa dos Dabneys)
- Submarine Cable Houses (Portuguese: Casas de Amarração dos Cabos Submarinos), the buildings that house the land-links to the submarine cables providing communication to the islands of the Azores, these three semi-submerged buildings in the ground go un-noticed at the base of Monte Queimado and Monte da Guia;
- Summer Residence of the Dabney Family (Portuguese: Casa de veraneio da Família Dabney, lagar e miradouro), the recuperated manor and wine-press buildings, and scenic lookout on the slopes of Monte da Guia, were popular with the Dabney family, the American first-family of the Azores;
- Warehouses of Reis & Martins Lda. (Portuguese: Armazéns de Reis e Martins Lda.) - located along Rua Nova, between the bays of Porto Pim and Horta, the old offices/warehouses of Reis & Martins were important in the construction and maintenance of motor launches and whaling boats, reaching its importance around 1946, when it was the most influential supply centre for the whaling industry on Faial. The original founders were Francisco Marcelino dos Reis, Joaquim Martins Amaral Júnior and Tomas Alberto Azevedo, who much later became associated with Costa & Martins, Lda. (another important supplier), and worked closely in partnership with the whaling company Companhia Baleeira Faialense, Lda, then the largest whaling company on the island. It was completely purchased by the Lisboete Francisco Marcelino dos Reis in 1940, where for the next 40 years it prospered as the Centro Nevrálgico da Baleação no Faial, then declining in importance with the fall of whaling in the region, and closing completely in 1981 (even as the last whale was hunted in 1987). The site fell into decay, housing several whaling boats, historical implements, construction materials and artifacts, before being analyzed by the Sea Observatory of the Azores (Portuguese: Observatório do Mar dos Açores).

=== Military ===
- 16th Century Bombardment Emplacements/Fortifications of Porto Pim (Portuguese: Bombardeira/Fortificação do Século XVII na baía do Porto Pim), in phase of classifications this coastal emplacements were part of an elaborate defensive network that followed the coastal edge, and elaborated in the 16th century;
- Bartizan of Porto Pim (Portuguese: Torre de Vigia do Porto Pim/Guarita of Porto Pim), part of the coastal defenses that ring the sheltered cove of Porto Pim constructed in the 15th century;
- Coastal Artillery Bunker (Portuguese: Bunker de Artilharia de Costa)
- Fort of Greta (Portuguese: Castelo da Greta/Forte do Monte da Guia; alternatively known as the Castle of Greta, Fort of Greta or Fort of Our Lady of the Guide) the remains of this medieval fortification are located on the edge of the cinder cone of Monte da Guia, facing the Faial-Pico Channel;
- Fort of Santa Cruz (Portuguese: Forte de Santa Cruz/Pousada da Horta), a 16th-century fortification located along Rua Vasco da Gama/Estrada Regional E.R.1-1^{a}, in the historic centre of the city, on the edge of Horta Bay. It was constructed as part of coastal defenses to defend the entrance to the harbour and southern access to the Bay from pirate and privateer attacks, along with its sister forts (Fort of Bom Jesus and Fort of Nossa Senhora da Guia). Its utility was called into question with successive defeats and did little more than garrison troops that saw little action after the Liberal Wars. In 1969, the derelict building (in the possession of the municipal authorities at the time) was re-purposed by the Direcção-Geral dos Edifícios e Monumentos Nacionais (DGEMN) (General-Directorate for Buildings and National Monuments), and officially re-opened by Pousadas de Portugal as a hostel on 23 September 2004 after interior remodelling.
- Fort of São Sebastião (Portuguese: Castelo de São Sebastião na baía do Porto Pim/Forte de São Sebastião), this simple fort includes exterior walls and a single-longhouse used to garrison a small contingent. Along with the fortified gates of Port Pim it protected ships in the small bay;
- Naval Radio Telegraphic Station of Horta (Portuguese: Estação Radiotelegráfica Naval da Horta), the modernist group of buildings were constructed in the mid-20th century to support naval operations and Atlantic shipping, providing transmission services, emergency meteorological advisories and assistance to trans-Atlantic shipping

=== Religious ===
- Church of Nossa Senhora das Angústias (Portuguese: Igreja Paroquial das Angústias/Igreja de Nossa Senhora das Angústias), centrally located by Horta harbour, this three-nave, three-register temple consisting of two belltowers is uniquely situated, contrary to the typical plan, facing away from the sea;
- Chapel of Nossa Senhora do Rosário (Portuguese: Capela da Nossa Senhora do Rosário);
- Hermitage of Nossa Senhora da Guia (Portuguese: Ermida da Nossa Senhora da Guia/Capela de Nossa Senhora da Guia), a Property of Public Interest, the hermitage of Our Lady of the Guide, located on the southern volcanic cone, Monte da Guia, was originally constructed by Captain-major Tomaz de Pórras Pereira, around 1600, but found in almost a complete state of ruins by 1700. Father António de Jesus Maria began a campaign to reconstruct the chapel, it was reopened on May 12, 1714, and the image from the Church of San Francisco was led in procession by clergy, standards and the faithful in a solemn procession to the hilltop, where the island confessor Gaspar Pereira de Lacerda led benedictions. It plays an integral part in the religious ceremonies of the annual Sea Week Festival (Portuguese: Semana do Mar): a procession accompanies the image of the Virgin Mary from the chapel to the beach at Porto Pim, where it is transported by boat and accompanied by a flotilla of ships to the main marina in Horta. From here, a secondary procession accompanies the image to the Church of Nossa Senhora das Angústias, where another mass is recited for the faithful. This religious celebration is traditionally escorted by local fisherman, as the Virgin Mary, in this role, is the patron saint of fishermen;
- Império of Angústias (Portuguese: Império das Angústias) - one of the buildings used in the annual celebration of the Holy Spirit;
- Império of the Holy Spirit of the Workers of Pasteleiro (Portuguese: Império do Espírito Santo dos Operários do Pasteleiro), this unique império is hidden in the walls of the old COFACO canning plant, and includes an arched facade of raised cornice emblazoned with the titles. The império was constructed in the 20th century, to support the local residential neighbourhood that was built up around the area of Pasteleiro.

== Notable citizens ==
- Júlio da Rosa (Flamengos, Horta; 24 May 1924) - Parish priest and Monseigneur, elevated to the latter title by Pope Benedict XVI (announced on 25 May 2006 by the Bishop of the Diocese of Angra, António Sousa Braga during a celebrations in honour of Nossa Senhora das Angústias). Son of José da Rosa da Silveira and Maria da Rosa da Silveira, residents of the parish of Praia do Norte, he was baptized in Flamengos on 21 June 1924, frequented the primary school there, before entering the seminary in Angra do Heroísmo in October 1938, becoming a priest by 1949. On 8 December 1949, he arrived at the parish and Church of Nossa Senhora das Angústias, taking-up residence and role as adjunct priest. From 1973 he was the parish priest, celebrating in 2009 his 60 years as priest of the parish. His contributions to the parish, include: founding member of the Núcleo Cultural da Horta (English: Cultural Nucleus of Horta); founded the Casa dos Rapazes (English: Boys' House) in 1955, which functioned until 1971, while at the same time helping to organize the Corpo Nacional de Escutas (English: Boy Scouts) local chapter 171; in 1956 he helped to organize the Grupo Coral da Igreja das Angústias (English: Choral Group of the Church of Angustias), today known as the Grupo Coral Mater Dei; in 1957 he also began teaching in Horta's lyceum (high school), which he continued to do in various disciplines until 1977; in 1960 he founded Conferencia Vicentina (English: Conference of Saint Vincent de Paul) in order to assist construction projects in the parish, and to support the parish kitchens (which served 120 meals daily until 1974); in 1963, he organized the third company of the Associação Guias de Portugal (English: Portuguese Guides Association), while also founding the Instituo Açoriano de Cultura (English: Azores Institute of Culture); he also helped to inaugurate the Museu de Arte Sacra da Horta (English: Museum of Sacred Art of Horta) in 1965 and was a co-founder of the Academia Mariana dos Açores (English: Academy of Maria of the Azores) in 1990.
