= Josse van Huerter =

First settler of the Portuguese island of Faial

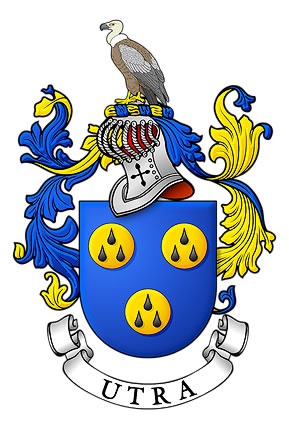
- Coat of Arms of the House of Utra (ancestral descendants of the De Hurtere family)

1st Donatary Captain of Faial
- In office 2 February 1468 – 1482
- Monarchs: Alphonso V; John II
- Constituency: Faial

1st Donatary Captain of Faial & Pico
- In office 1482–1495
- Monarchs: John II; Emmanuel I
- Constituency: Faial/Pico

Personal details
- Born: Joost De Hurtere; 1430 Torhout, West Flanders
- Died: 1495 (aged 64–65) Angústias, Horta
- Resting place: Chapel of Santa Cruz (Church of Nossa Senhora das Angústias)
- Citizenship: Flanders
- Spouse: Beatriz de Macedo
- Children: Joss de Utra; Joana de Macedo

Joost De Hurtere (1430 in Torhout, Burgundian Netherlands – 1495 in Horta, Azores islands, Kingdom of Portugal), also known by several transliterations (such as Josse van Huerter, Josse van Hurtere, Josse De Hurtere or Joss van Hürter, and later in Portuguese, Joss de Utra or just Dutra) was the first settler, and captain-major of the Portuguese island of Faial in the Azores. After 1482, the island of Pico was also incorporated into his captaincy. His son, Joss de Utra would later inherit the captaincy from him after his death.

== Biography ==
=== Early life ===
De Hurtere, a name of Flemish origin, appears frequently in Portuguese writings with many variations. What is known, is that the family name De Hurtere evolved through Portuguese transliteration to Utra and later Dutra (a contraction of De Utra, "Of Utra"). Similarly, the city of Horta (settled by De Hurtere and his Flemish compatriots) would owe its name to an adulterated variation on the De Hurtere name. Joost, has also appeared with some variations; Joost De Hurtere himself used Josse and the shorter Joss in communications, although Joz, Job, Jobst and Jost have also been identified.

He was the second son of Leon De Hurtere, Lord of Hagebroek, of a governing family with feudal holdings in Wijnendale, West Flanders: his father was a bailiff and chairman of the municipal council of Wijnendale appointed by Adolph of Cleves, Lord of Ravenstein. Marcelino Lima was among the first who stated that the De Hurtere holdings were specifically in Hagebroek, refuting the claims of the German navigator and geographer Martin Behaim, in his Globo de Nuremberga (who believed that the noble family lived in Moerkirchen). The De Hurtere family was of noble lineage, and established heraldry, who dedicated themselves in the homeland, which was confirmed by a 1527 document, by Jacques De Hurtere, of Flanders, the cousin of Joss de Utra (second Captain-Donee of Faial), and chronicled by Manuel Luís Maldonado.

Little is known of his life prior to his participation in the great exploration and colonization of the 15th Century. What is known is that he frequented the circles of Flemish nobility, and made friendships in the court of Isabella of Portugal, the Duchess of Burgundy and Countess of Flanders (who established a parallel court to her husband). Although his family belonged to lower nobility, he was always under threat of a life in financial misery. Yet, he had pretensions to life as a courtesan and regularly overspent, but had the sensibility to accept the protection of the Duchess. It was at this time that the new Captain-Donee of the Azores, the Infante D. Fernando, established contacts with his aunt Isabella, wife of Duke Philip the Good and mother of Charles the Bold.

=== Captain-Donee ===
About 1460, Joost made an acquaintance of Friar Pedro, the Queen's confessor, who traveled with the Infanta Isabella. He developed a friendship with the young nobleman, and quickly promoted the advantages of exploration in the "new" islands of the Azores. D. Pedro talked to De Hurtere of the islands and what he believed were large deposits of silver and tin (referring to the islands as the fabled Ilhas Cassitérides or Islands of Tin). De Hurtere later convinced 15 impoverished Flemings of the profitability of a venture in the archipelago. Around 1465, De Hurtere first disembarked along the eastern coast in the channel between Pico and Faial, in an area that would later be known as Praia de Almofariz (now Praia do Almoxarife). The expedition remained in the area around Lomba dos Frades for about a year, until about the time their supplies ran out. It was at this time that many of his compatriots became disenchanted with De Hurtere and angered by the lack of return on their investments: finding none of the promised precious metals. Things escalated and De Hurtere nearly escaped to Flanders, abandoning some on the island, and returning hastily to the court of the Duchess of Burgundy.

He returned, in 1466–67, with the aid of the Duchess of Burgundy, who assisted her vassal in his protection under the Crown of Portugal. The Duchess would send a two-year supply of the equipment, foodstuffs, animals and materials to support the fledgling colony made up of Flemish nationals looking for a new life following the Hundred Years War. But, quickly, He discovered the limitations of the area owing to the lack of sufficient potable water. He abandoned the main settlement in Almofariz, in favor of the adjacent valley (later known as the Valley of Flamengos). De Hurtere would later extend his community farther south along the shore of Horta Bay, where he would construct a small chapel to Santa Cruz, that would become the nucleus of the small village.

The Infante Ferdinand, Duke of Viseu, had bestowed on De Hurtere the first captaincy of the island on 2 February 1468, which would later extend to the neighboring island of Pico (29 December 1482) by Infanta Beatrice.

De Hurtere cultivated new relationships in Flanders, hoping to construct a "New Flanders" by attracting a second wave of settlers to Faial. One of them, Willem De Kersemakere, brought administrators, tradesmen, settlers and other compatriots to settle on the island. This was a short-term colony, owing to a falling out between De Hurtere and De Kersemakere, the latter abandoned the island, eventually settling on Flores. On 15 October 1484, De Hurtere was honored with a knighthood in the House of the Duke of Viseu.

=== Family and Later life ===
He was married to D. Beatriz de Macedo, daughter of Jerónimo Fernandes, the governess of the Infanta Beatrice, who bore him two children. De Hurtere's son, Joss de Utra (who would become the second Captain-General of Faial), and daughter, Dona Joana de Macedo were born on Faial. Joss de Utra would later marry Dona Isabel Corte Real, and Dona Joana would marry Martin Behaim, a German navigator/cartographer at the Chapel of Santa Cruz.

Joost De Hurtere's sister, Josina De Hurtere, and his illegitimate half brother Boudewijn De Hurtere (Balduino de Utra/Dutra) also settled on Faial around 1468. Josina married Nuno Fernandes, originally of the Isle of Madeira, and their son, Antonio d'Utra Nunes, served as Deputy Capitao of both the Isles of Faial and Pico. Boudewijn's daughter, Christina De Hurtere married the Flemish Antonius Cornelis and had one daughter, Isabella De Hurtere, who became the wife of Tomás de Pórras, the Elder.

De Hurtere died in 1495 in Horta, and along with his wife (in 1531) would be buried in the Chapel of Santa Cruz, where today the Church of Nossa Senhora das Angústias is located.

The descendants of the Azorean De Hurtere family exist to this day, the surname having changed to Dutra, Silveira and Morais (aka: Dutra de Morais).

== See also ==
- Jácome de Bruges
- Willem van der Haegen
- Josse van Aertrycke
