= Porto Pim bartizan =

Medieval watchtower in the Azores, Portugal

Bartizan of Porto Pim
- Torre de Vigia do Porto Pim
- Faial, Central, Azores in Portugal
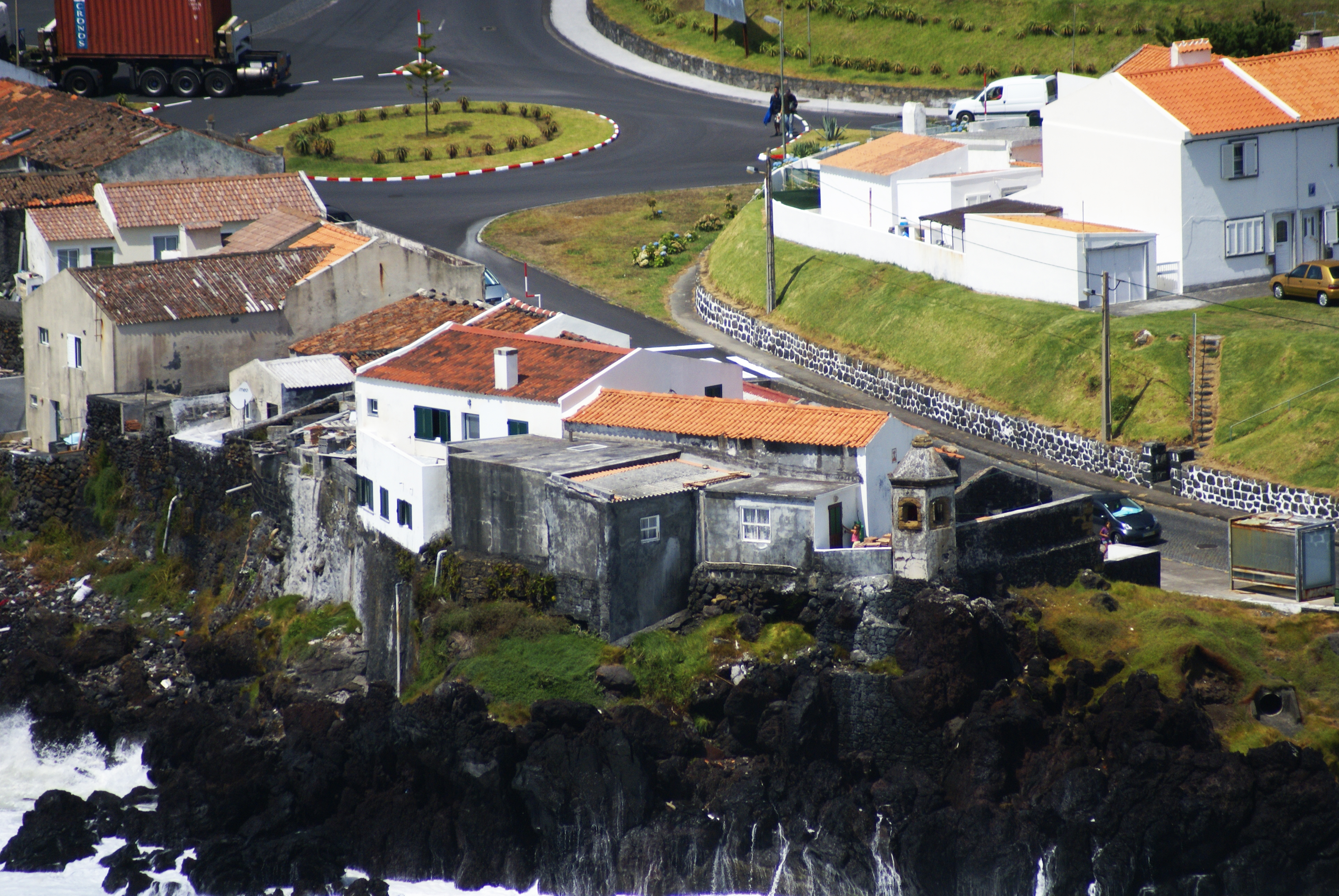
- The view of the watchtower with the homes along the coastal cliffs of Porto Pim behind it

Site information
- Type: Castle
- Owner: Portuguese Republic
- Operator: Direção Regional de Cultura
- Open to the public: Public

Location
- Coordinates: 38°31′28″N 28°37′54.9″W

Site history
- Built: 15th century

The Bartizan of Porto Pim (Portuguese: Torre de Vigia do Porto Pim/Guarita of Porto Pim) is a watchtower located in the civil parish of Angústias, in the municipality of Horta.

== History ==
The bartizan was integrated into the complex of fortifications that ringed the coast of Porto Pim, under the coordination of the Fort of São Sebastião. It was a simple watchtower with the function of guarding the southwest entrance into the bay.

The watchtower was classified as a Property of Public Interest in 1984 and later in 2004.

== Architecture ==
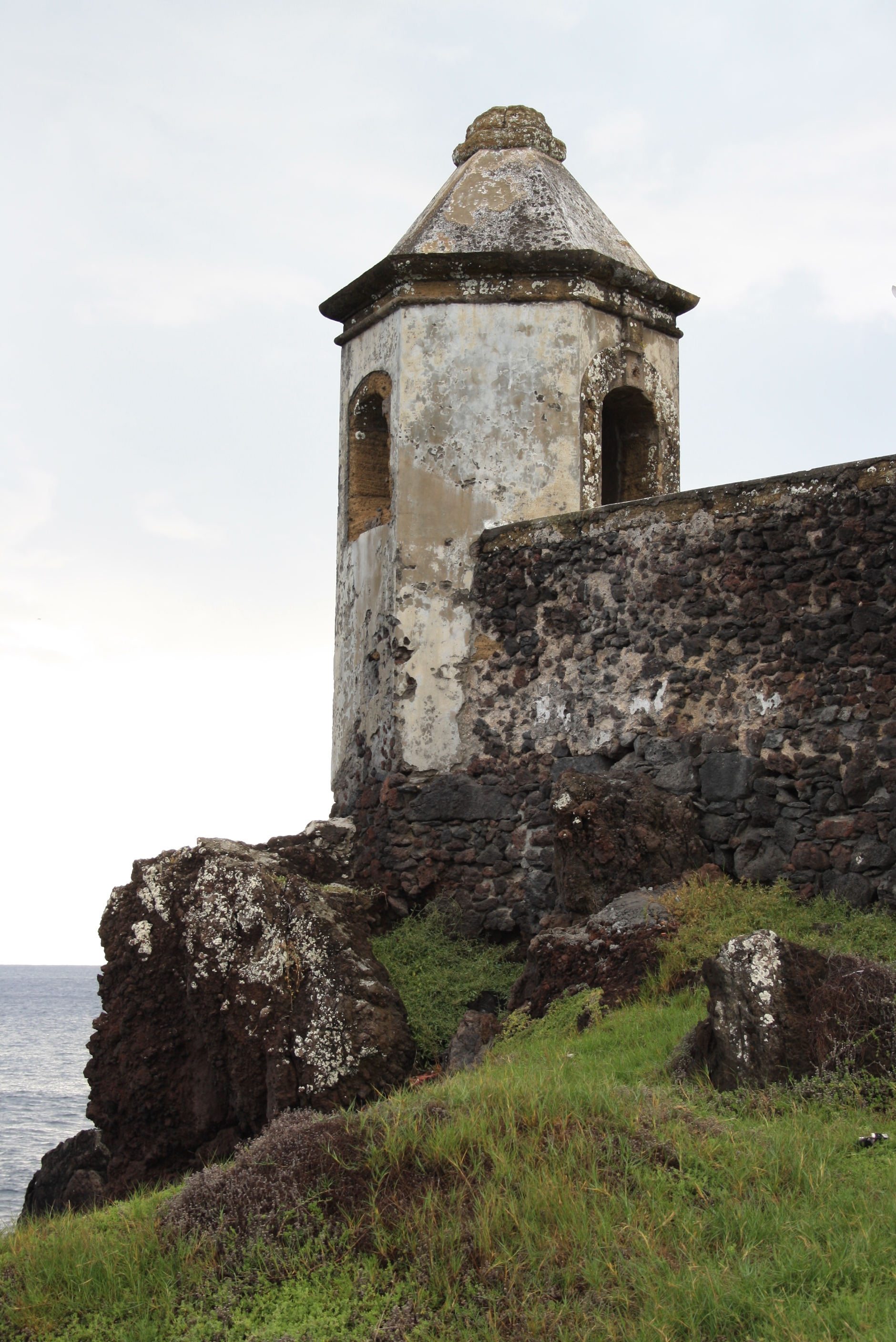
A view of the remnants of the solitary watchtower

It was erected in the extreme western edge of the bay of Porto Pim, addorsed to the hexagonal plan of decorated stone. The structure was implanted in the cliffs at the edge, with walls extending towards the direction of the bay. The bartizan is a hexagonal structure with window surmounted by a pyramidal covering.
