= Porto Pim Whale Factory Museum =

- Antiga Fábrica da Baleia do Porto Pim
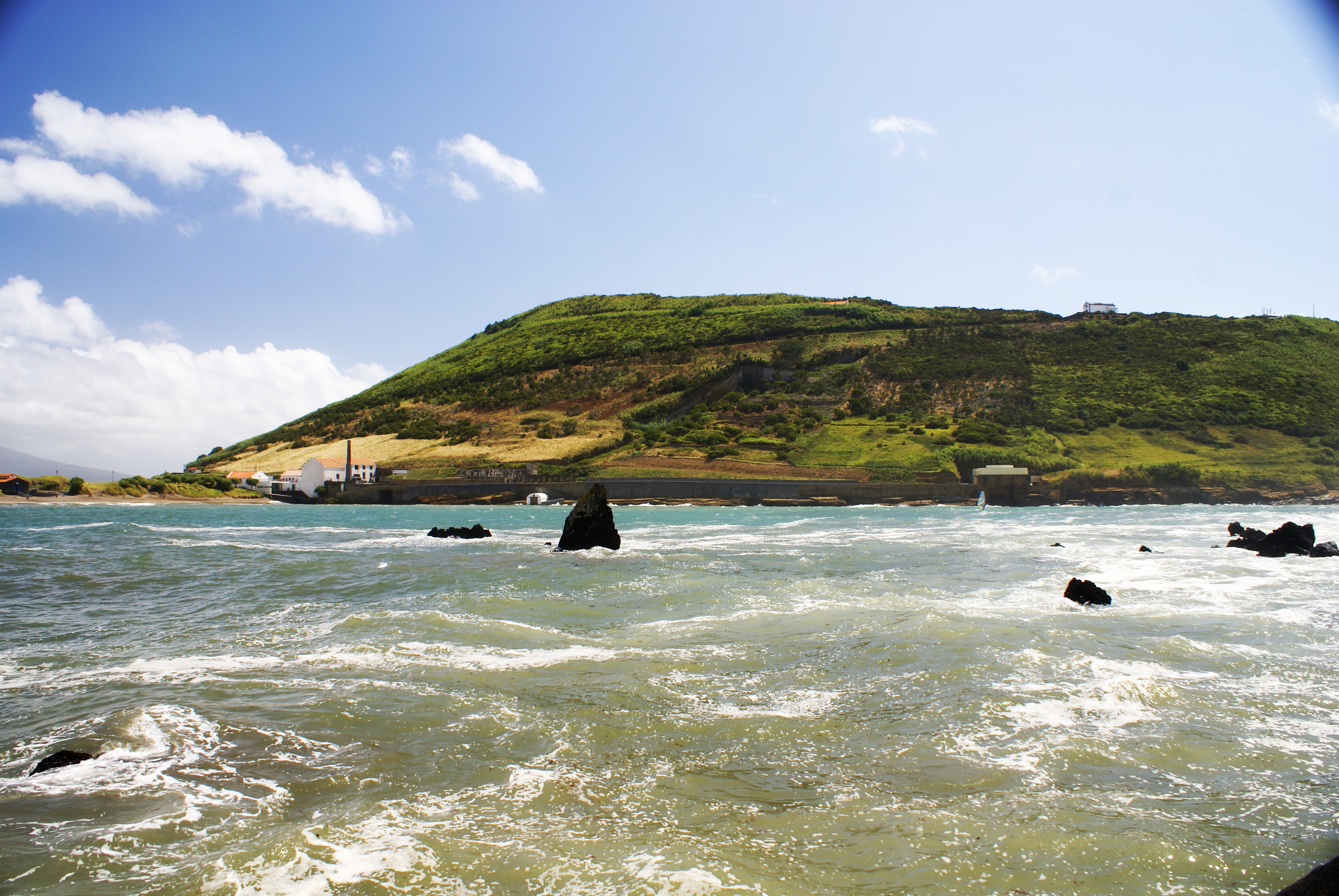
- A view of the Bay of Porto Pim, with the Whale Factory Museum (to the left), during a summer storm
- Interactive map of the Porto Pim Whale Factory Museum area

General information
- Type: Museum
- Architectural style: Modern architecture
- Location: Angústias, Portugal
- Coordinates: 38°31′23.02″N 28°37′31.29″W
- Opened: 19th century
- Owner: Governo Regional dos Açores

Technical details
- Material: Basalt

The Porto Pim Whale Factory Museum (Portuguese: Fábrica da Baleia e Centro do Mar) is a whaling museum in the civil parish of Angústias, in the municipality of Horta, in the Portuguese archipelago of the Azores. Dedicated to the socio-economic influence of the whaling industry in the region, the museum was established in the abandoned whaling factory used for many years in the processing of whale blubber into oil.

== History ==
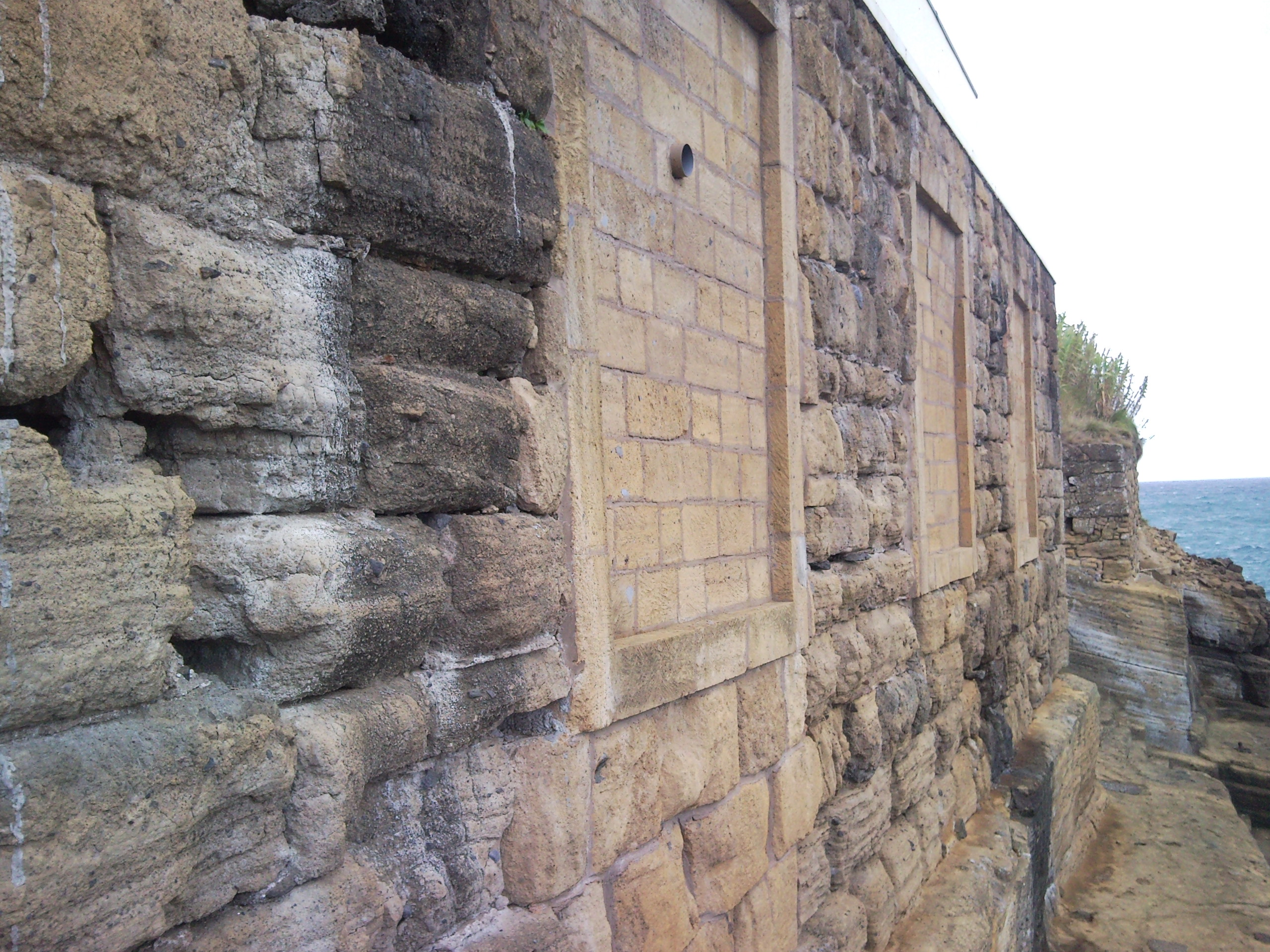
The abandoned 19th century whale factory at the edge of bay, later converted to municipal aquarium

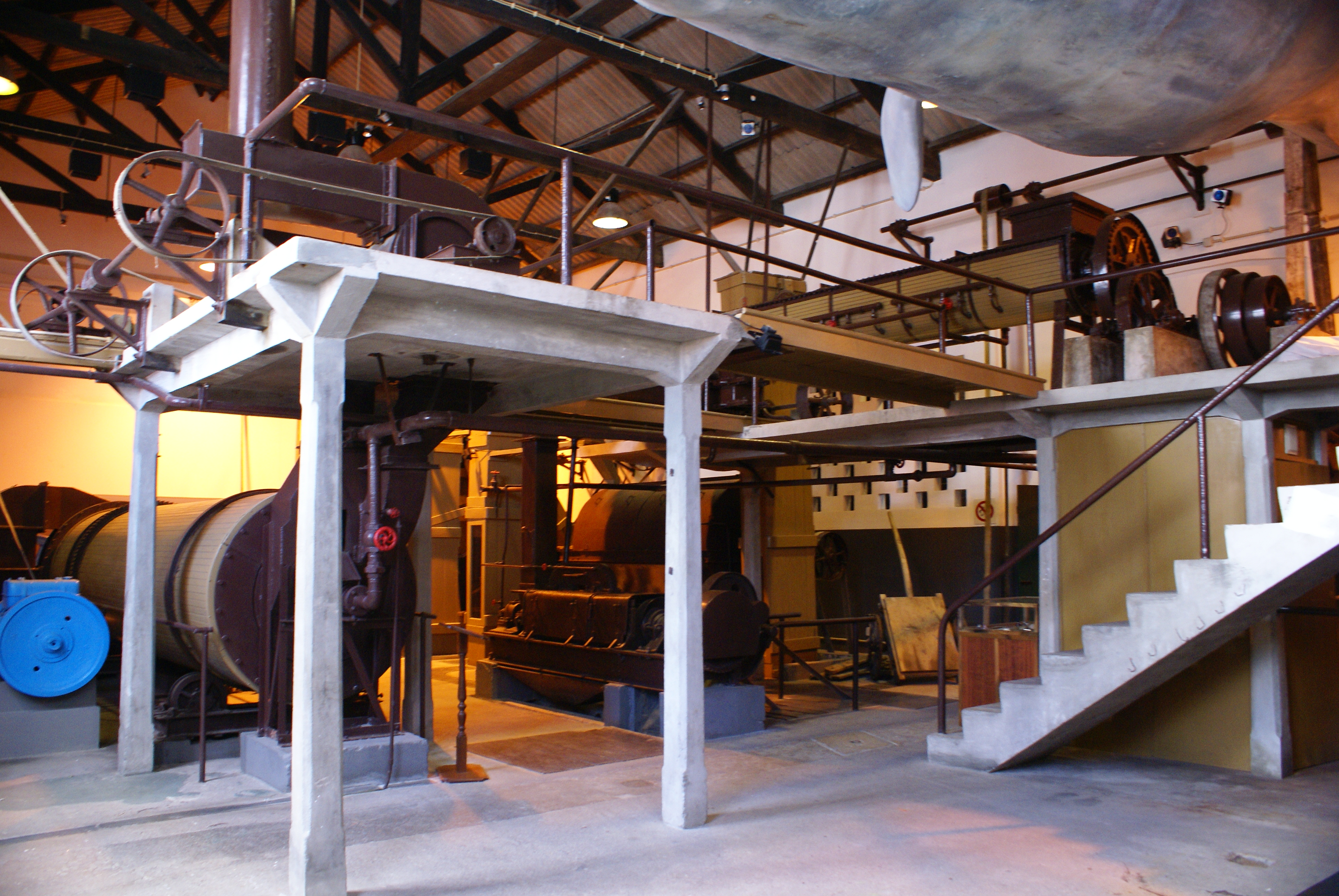
The interior exposition area of the museum, showing platforms and Fábrica da Baleia, actual Museu da Baleia.

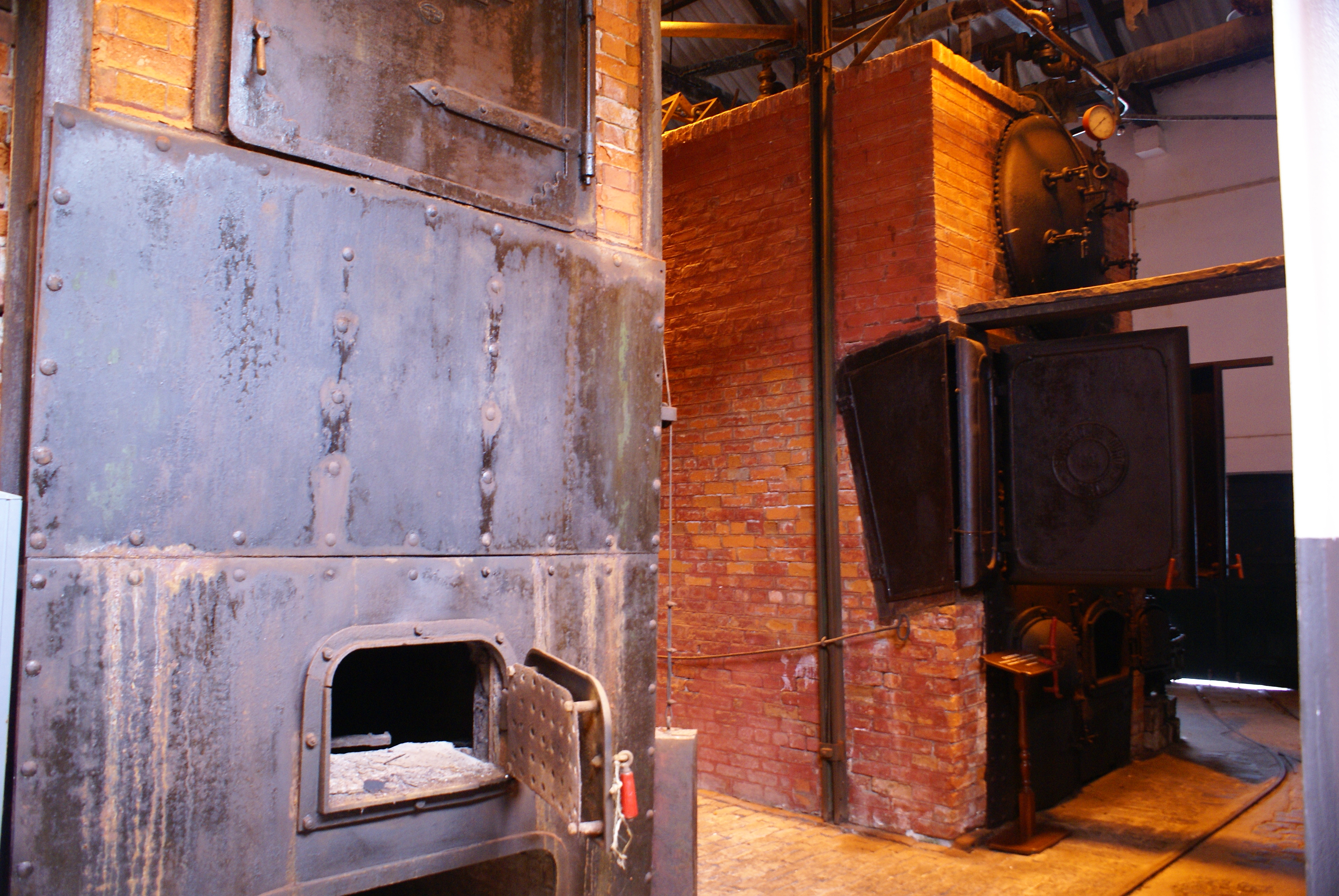
The two steam-boilers used in the mechanization of the rendering process

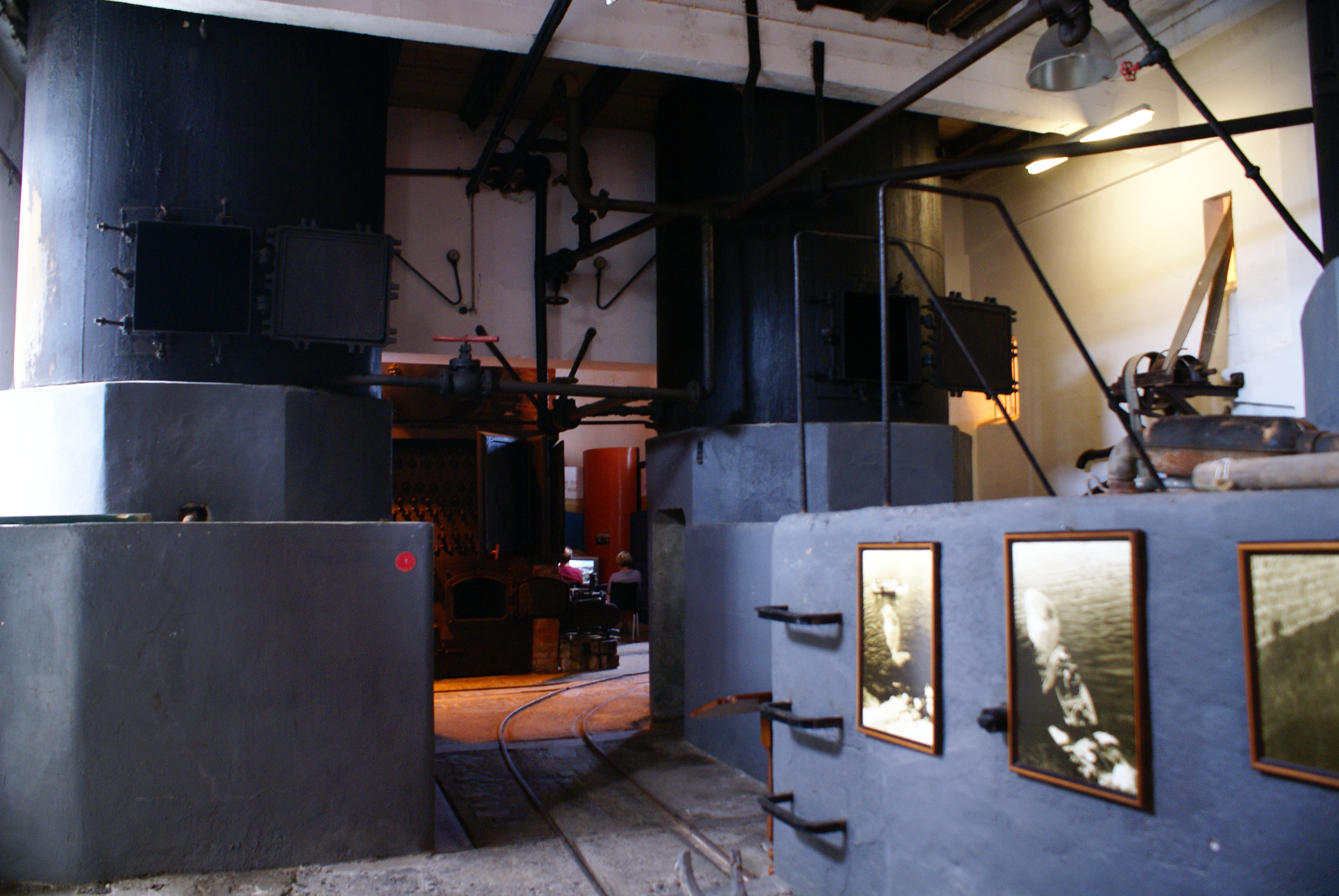
Two of the four autoclaves used for rendering fat

On Faial, the whaling industry evolved rapidly from an incepet activity into an industry that brought wealth and prosperity locally, to the point where there existed two factories. The oldest and first of this type was founded at the end of the 19th century, and continued operating until the 20th century, when a new building was constructed to adapt to the new technologies of the time.

The new factory was built between 1941 and operated until 1975. It was an operation that used steam-powered equipment using autoclaves, which permitted a rapid processing of whale and total rendering of the mammals. The factory of Porto Pim began to operate in 1942, during the Second World War, at a time when the exportation of oil was at its peak. The property was owned by SIMAL Sociedade Industrial Marítimia Açoriana Lda. (Azorean Industrial Maritime Society) which was constituted in 1939 from 25 partners, that included the Lisboeta Francisco Marcelino dos Reis and the local business Costa & Martins Lda. SIMAL was established to explore the whale oil concession, in addition to other species of marine animals, and commercialize products produce from the rendering of these mammals.

The factory was technologically innovative for the time. The proprietors had acquired the majority of the machinery overseas, including the flour-making equipment, which was purchased from the Norwegian company Myrens Verksted. Similarly, the motors that drove the machinery were acquired the German company MotorenFabrik Deutz AG. The factory operated using vapour generated from two large kettles (dating from 1904), approximately 130 square metres (1,400 ft^{2}) and 120 square metres (1,300 ft^{2}) of heating area. This equipment allowed the rendering of 60–65 tonnes of oil and six tonnes of flour. During the 30 years of operation, the factory in Porto Pim processed 1940 sperm whales and produced enough whale oil to fill 44,000 barrels.

In 1974, accompanying the decline of the whaling industry around the world, the factory closed down its operations, following the adherence of the Portuguese government to international obligations in the anti-whaling movement. It was bought by the Regional Government in 1980 and, in 1984, classified as a Property of Public Interest (IIP). In 2000, after public works to restore the buildings, it was inaugurated during the second Expopescas exposition, to operate as the Centro do Mar, in order to operate as a cultural and scientific interpretative centre. Most of the machinery and equipment were completely restored, and represent a precious marker of traditional practices and socio-cultural influences on the culture of the island. Since 2004, the factory museum has been operated by the OMA Observatório do Mar dos Açores (Azores Ocean Observatory).
