= Fort of Greta (Horta) =

- Forte de Greta
- Faial, Central, name=Azores in Portugal
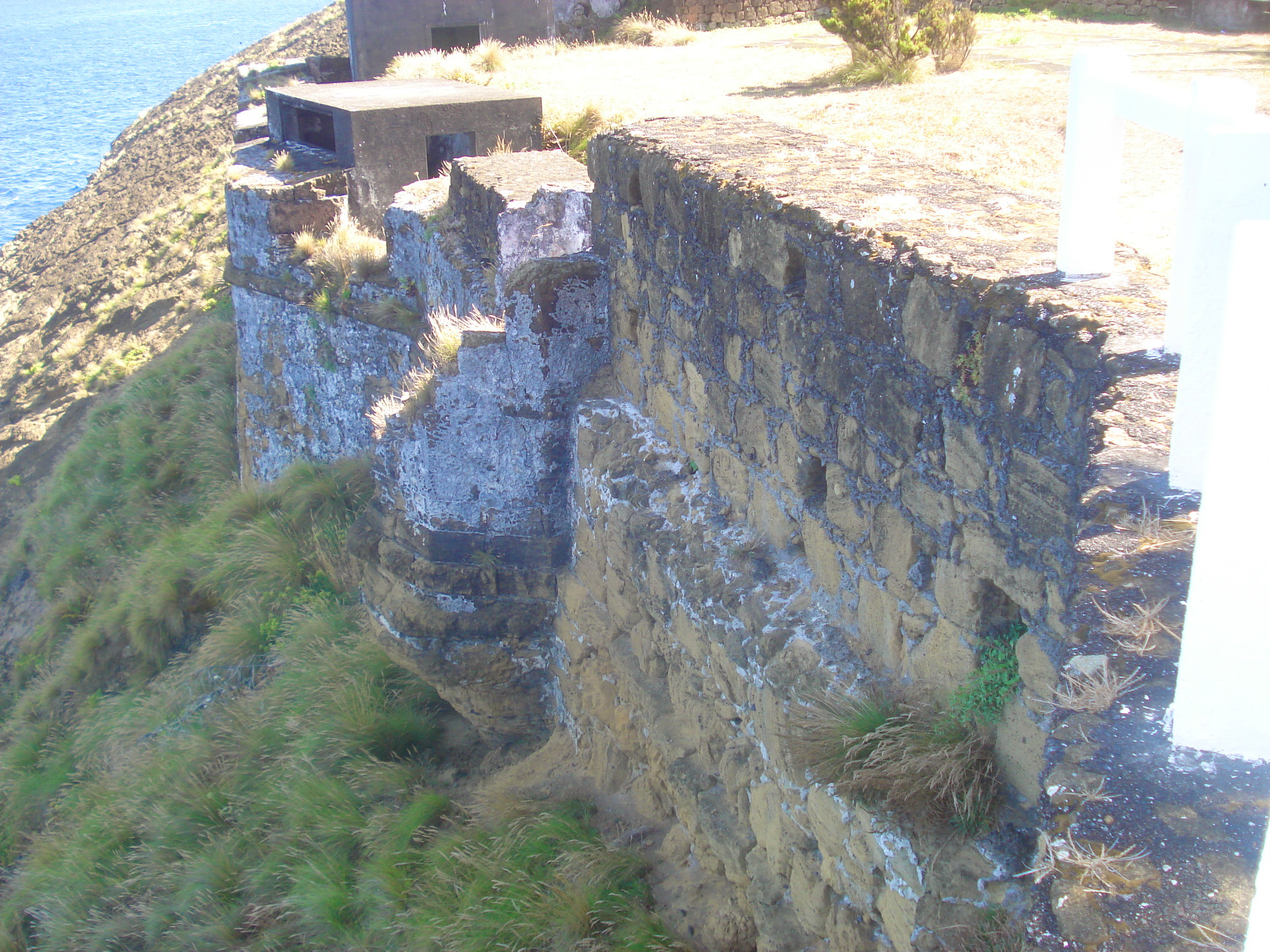
- The ruined walls of the Fort of Greta, along the slopes of Monte da Guia

Site information
- Type: Fort
- Owner: Câmara Municipal de Horta
- Open to the public: Public

Location
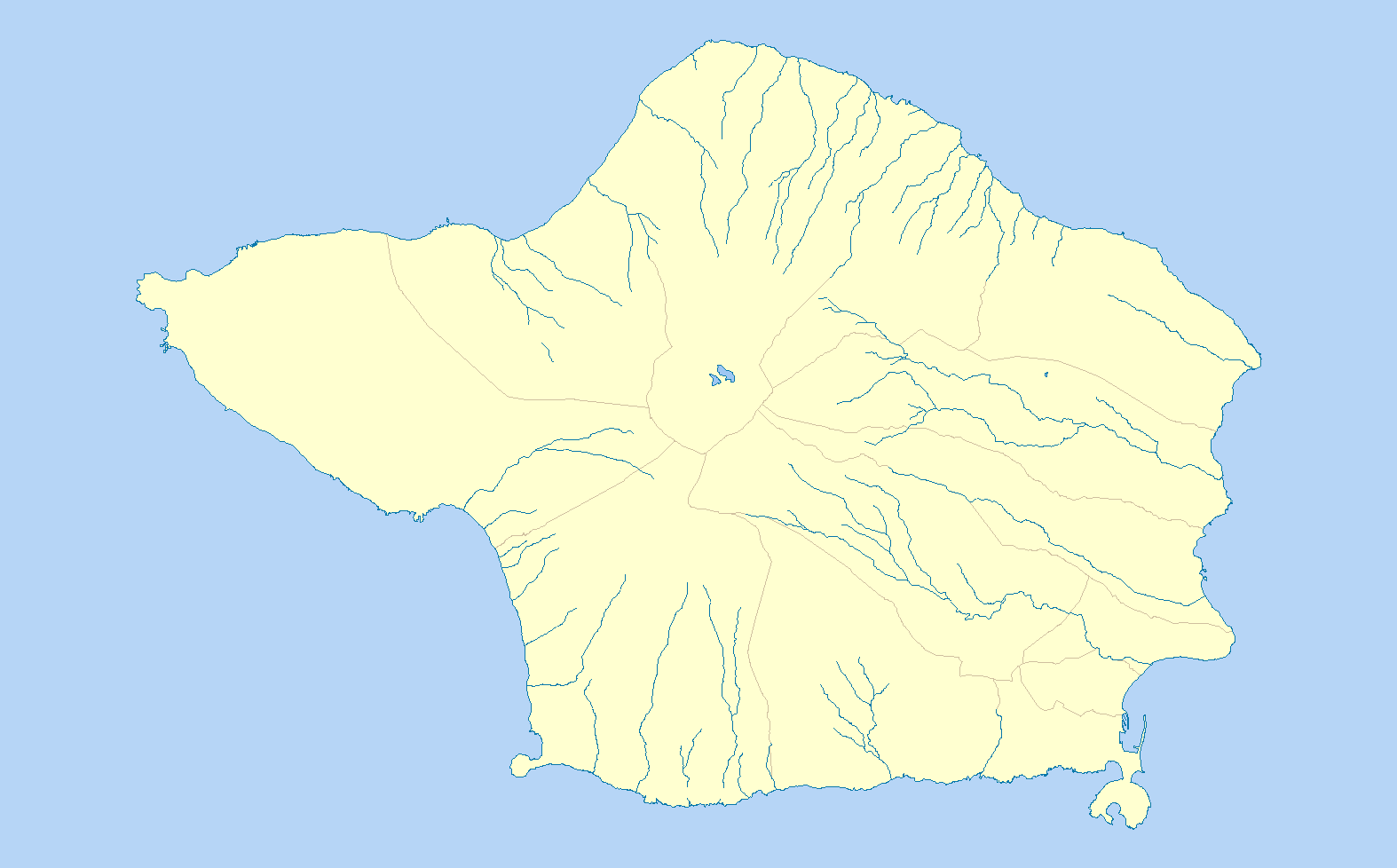
- Location of the Guia Fort within the municipality of Horta, island of Faial
- Coordinates: 38°31′10.86″N 28°37′12.48″W

Site history
- Built: 16th century
- Materials: Basalt, Tuff

The Fort of Greta (also referred to as the Castelo da Greta, Forte da Guia or Forte da Nossa Senhora da Guia da Horta, respectively: Castle of Greta, Fort of Greta or Fort of Our Lady of the Guide) is a fortification, whose remnants are located on the cinder cone of Monte da Guia, along the southern coast of the civil parish of Angústias, in Horta, island of Faial, in the Portuguese Azores.

== History ==
Its construction was initiated in 1666, to complement the coastal defenses of the city of Horta, which at the time, was always under the threat of marauding pirates and privateers, as well as British, French and Spanish forces. It worked in conjunction with a similar fortification in the area of Areia Larga, on the island of Pico across the channel from Faial.

In the 20th century, with the opening of a roadway on Monte da Guia, parts of the fortification were demolished, in order to allow accessibility to the hermitage and communications equipment on its peak. The remains of the fort are actually in ruins: all but the original wall stone remains. In the 1950s, within the walls of the redoubt, the Portuguese government constructed a pair of elevated platforms in order to install maritime radar lookouts. The two-stage platforms occupy the interior courtyard of the redoubt.

The space was integrated into the Protected Landscape of Monte da Guia (Portuguese: Paisagem Protegida do Monte da Guia under regional decree 1/80/A, on 31 January 1980. It is classified as a property of public interest (Portuguese: Imóvel de Interesse Público) under the regional legislation on patrimony and culture, 13/84/A (31 March 1984) and under paragraph 4, of article 58, of the Regional Decree 29/2004/A (24 August 1984).

== Architecture ==
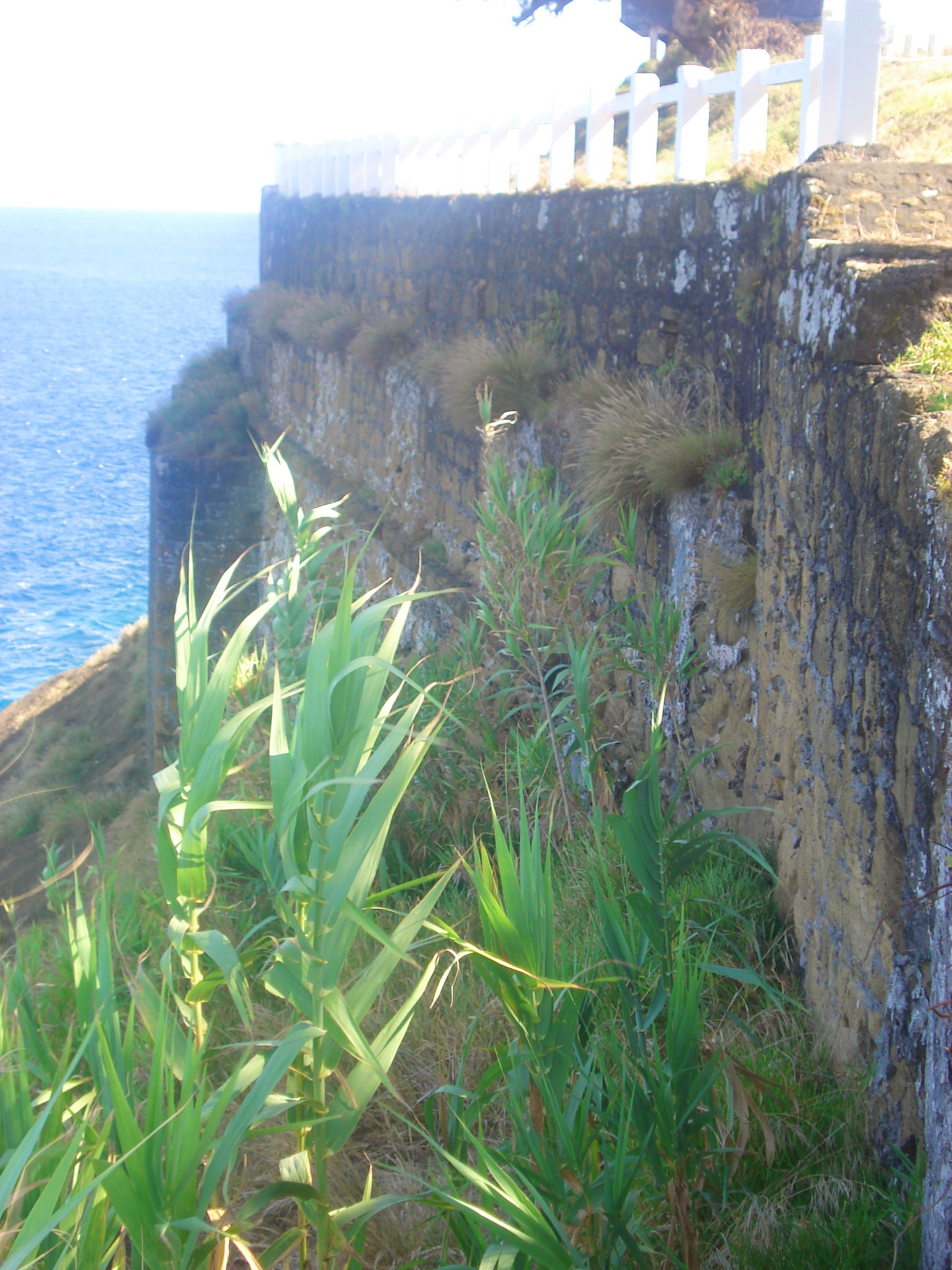
The 16th century walls of the Greta Fort, alongside the main road that carved the medieval fortification

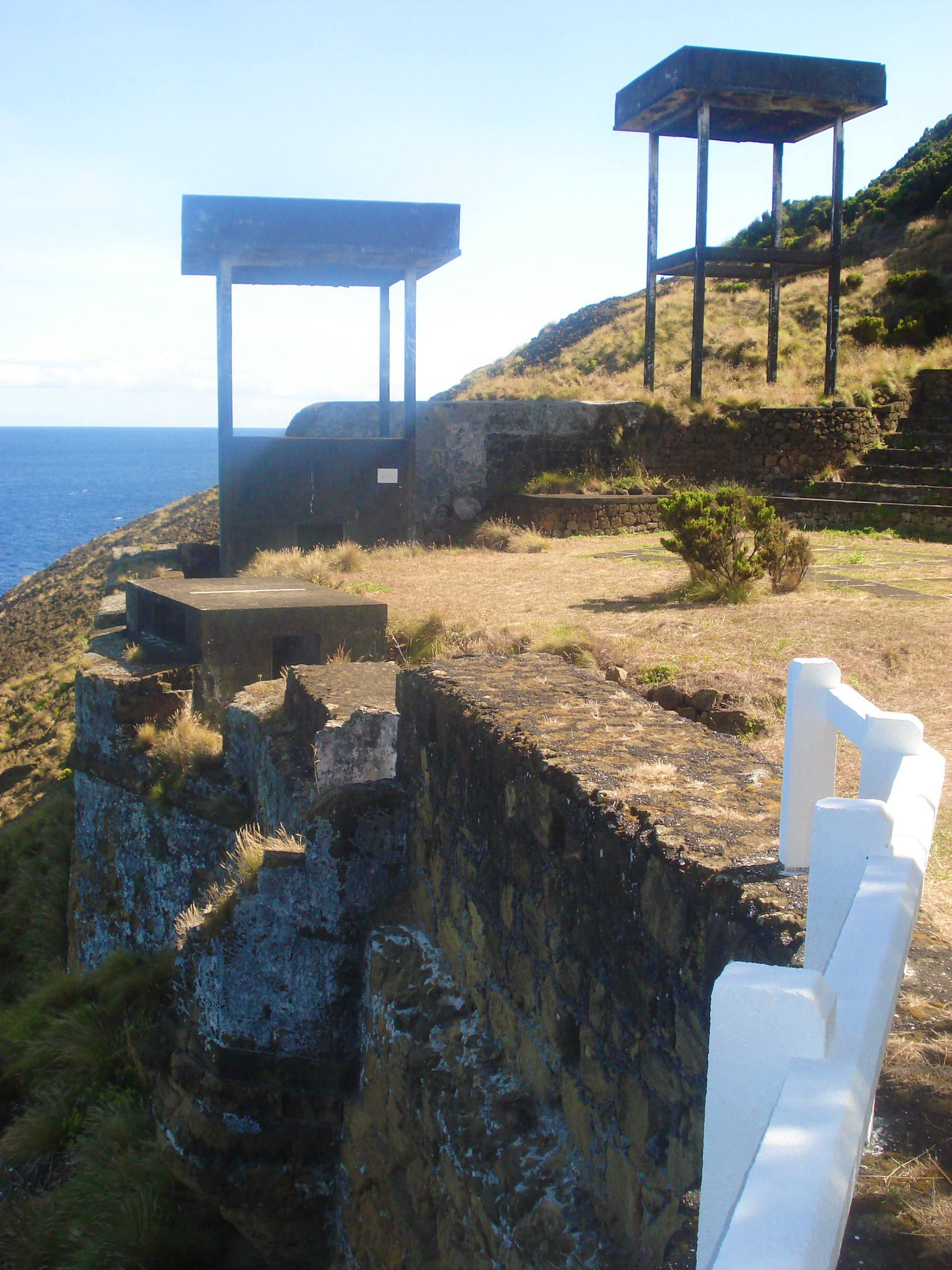
The remains of the Fort of Greta, with the 20th century radar platforms

Erected on the eastern flank of the Monte da Guia, in a dominant position over the Bay of Horta, and integrated into the medieval defensive system against pirates in the channel. It was built from masonry stone and volcanic rock: its most obvious extent is visible in the dozen canon battlements that face the island of Pico.

The design follows the irregular polygon-design of most forts, although many of the structures have been subsumed by erosion, debris and re-purposing by successive administrations. Much of the defensive plan has been superseded by early 20th century constructs, such as the double-platform radar observation towers and small buildings used to shelter military officers.
