= Flamengos =

- Civil parish
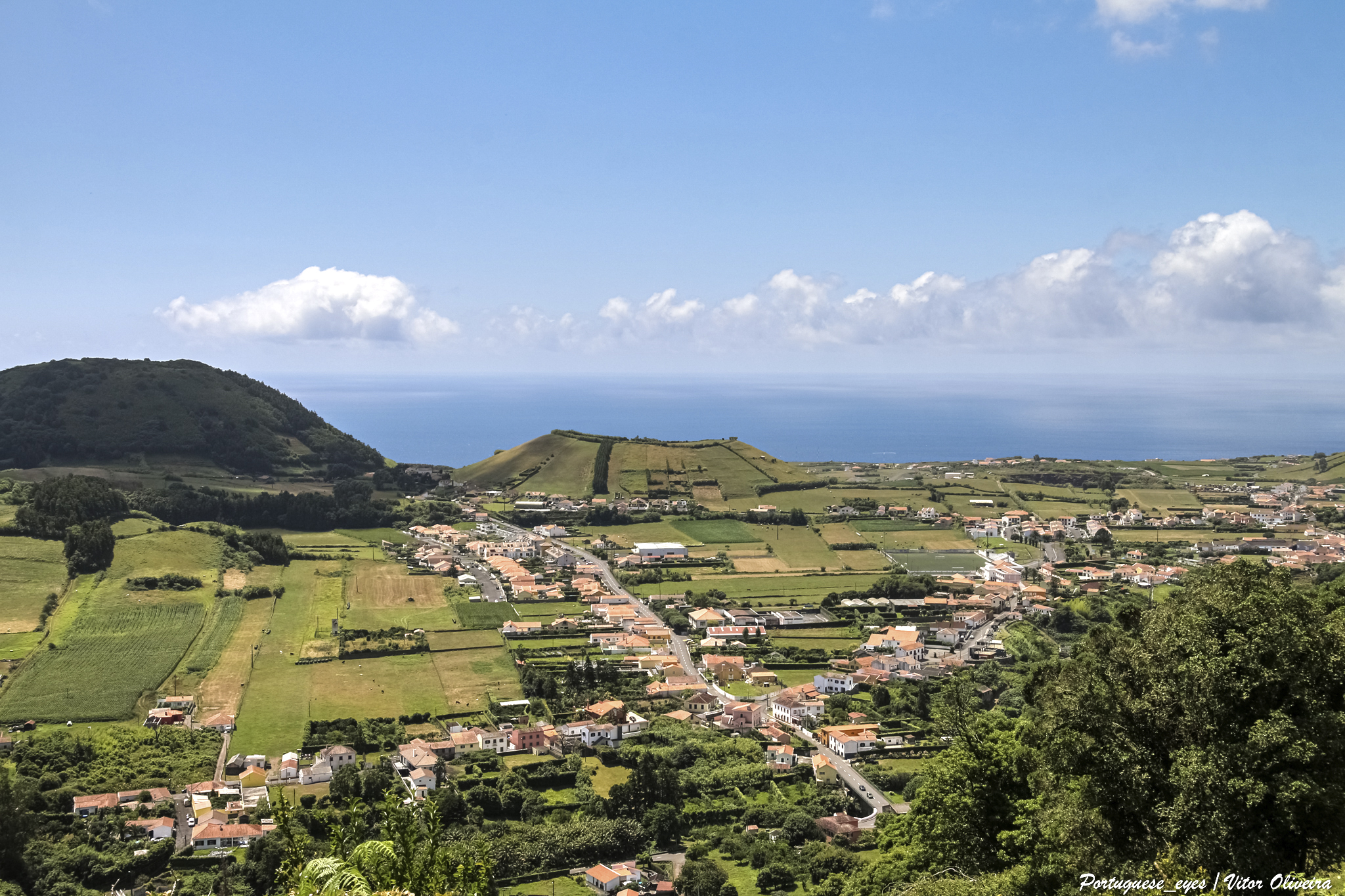
- The village of Flamengos, the location of the first agglomeration of settlement on the island of Faial

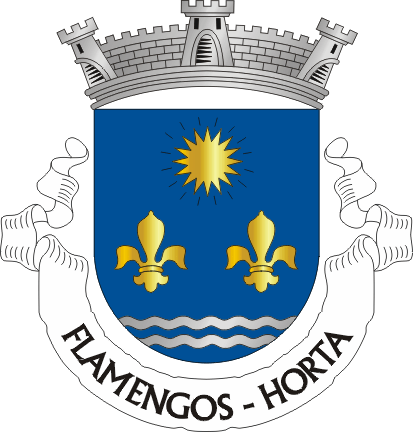
- Coat of arms

- Location of the civil parish of Flamengos within the municipality of Horta
- Coordinates: 38°33′7″N 28°39′1″W
- Country: Portugal
- Auton. region: Azores
- Island: Faial
- Municipality: Horta
- Established: Settlement: c. 1468

Area
  - Total: 14.62 km^{2} (5.64 sq mi)
- Elevation: 129 m (423 ft)

Population (2011)
  - Total: 1,604
  - Density: 109.7/km^{2} (284.2/sq mi)
- Time zone: UTC−01:00 (AZOT)
  - Summer (DST): UTC+00:00 (AZOST)
- Postal code: 9900-401
- Area code: 292
- Patron: Nossa Senhora da Luz
- Website: http://www.flamengos.pt/

Flamengos (pronounced [fla.ˈmẽ.ɡuʃ]) is a Portuguese civil parish (Portuguese: freguesia) on the island of Faial in the archipelago of the Azores. Its name was derived from the grouping of Flemish settlers who made their homes in this landlocked valley, in the municipality of Horta. The population in 2011 was 1,604, in an area of 14.62 km². It contains the localities Cruz do Bravo, Farrobo, Lameiro Grande, Rua Nova, São Lourenço and Tafoneiro.

== History ==
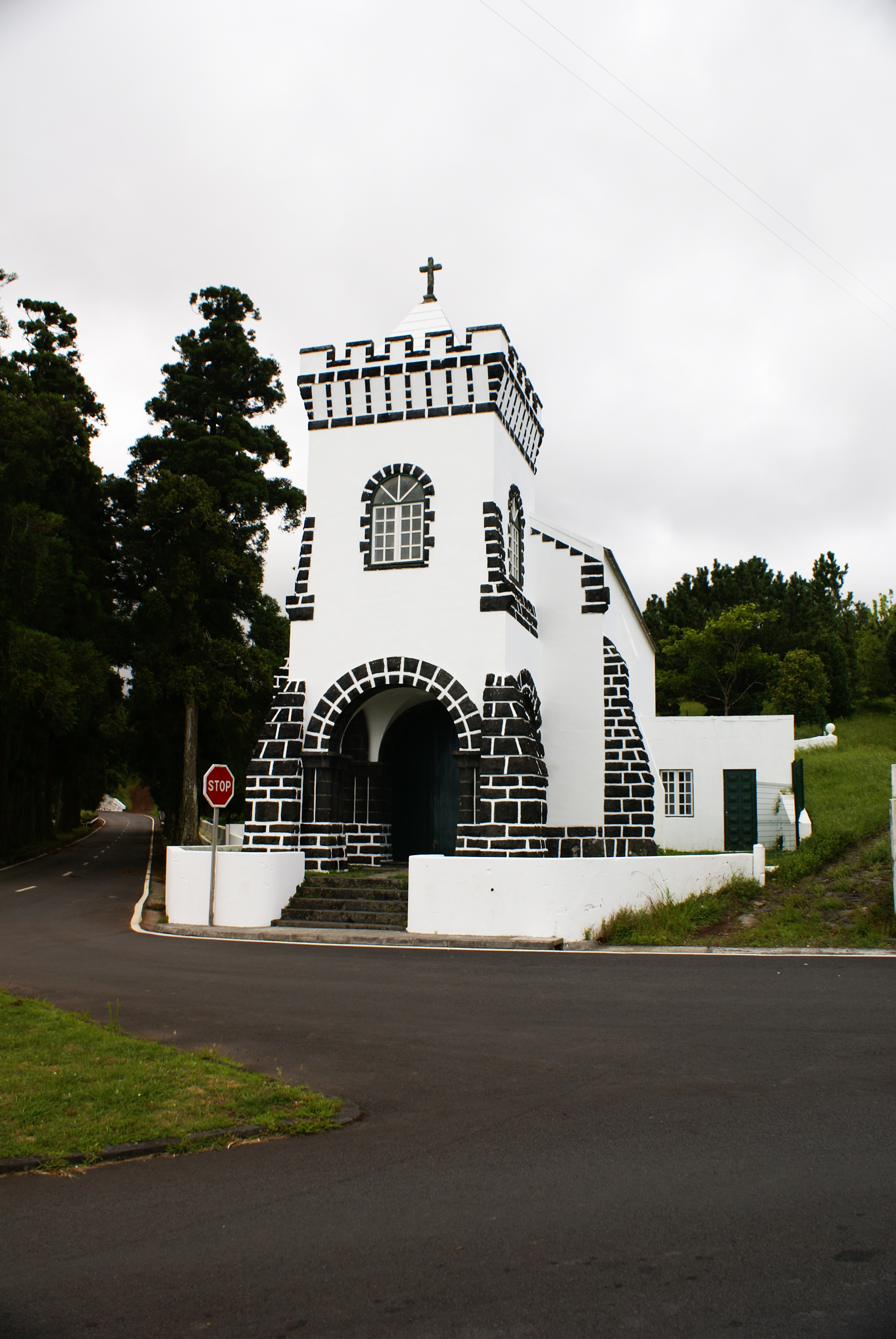
The chapel of São João, in the foothills of Flamengos is the focus of annual festivals on 24 June

The first settlers that arrived in the area that became known as the Vale dos Flamengos (English: Flemish Valley, or literally, Valley of the Flemish people), were seeking a sheltered area that provided access to potable water. Their original beachhead, on the Lomba dos Frades, in the Praia do Almoxarife valley was a disaster for the first Captain-Donatário Josse van Huerter (in 1465. His return in 1466-67 began a new phase in the island's history; discovering the fertile and sheltered geomorphology of the interior valley allowed the group of Flemish settlers to establish a foothold on the island (1468). These early colonizers cultivated small parcels of land along the river, taking advantage of the springs and fertile volcanic soils, cultivating oranges, corn, legumes, as well as servicing the town and other parishes on the island.

The community's primitive church (dedicated to Nossa Senhora da Luz) was constructed shortly after the first settlers established their homes, and was a large three-nave over five pillars, sturdy and well constructed (as the historian Gaspar Frutuoso recounted in his Saudades da Terra).

In 1597, Flamengos was raided by English privateers, who remained in the valley for days, pillaging and destroying homes. In 1606 the village of Flamengos had been restored, through the assistance of Jerónimo de Utra Corte Real, and later expanded in 1736, through the initiatives of Manuel Brum da Silveira.

Raul Brandão, in his As Ilhas Desconhecidas (1926), described the parish in these terms: "This use to be more animated and rich. Everything around Horta and Flamengos was houses, orchards full of oranges, plants and flowers, the Estate of São Lourenço, the Estate of the Silveiras, the Estate of the Dabneys...". Brandão was referring to a period when the wealthy, rich property owners and farmers had their summer homes and estates within the valley: by 1926, the area was less important for the upwardly mobile, who concentrated in their salons in Horta.

On 31 December 1936, a violent earthquake destroyed most of the buildings and homes in the parish. Unfortunately, a similar event occurred on 23 November 1973 and later on 9 June 1998, which permanently destroyed the church of Nossa Senhora da Luz (English: Our Lady of the Light). The church was rebuilt and inaugurated on 3 April 2016.

== Geography ==
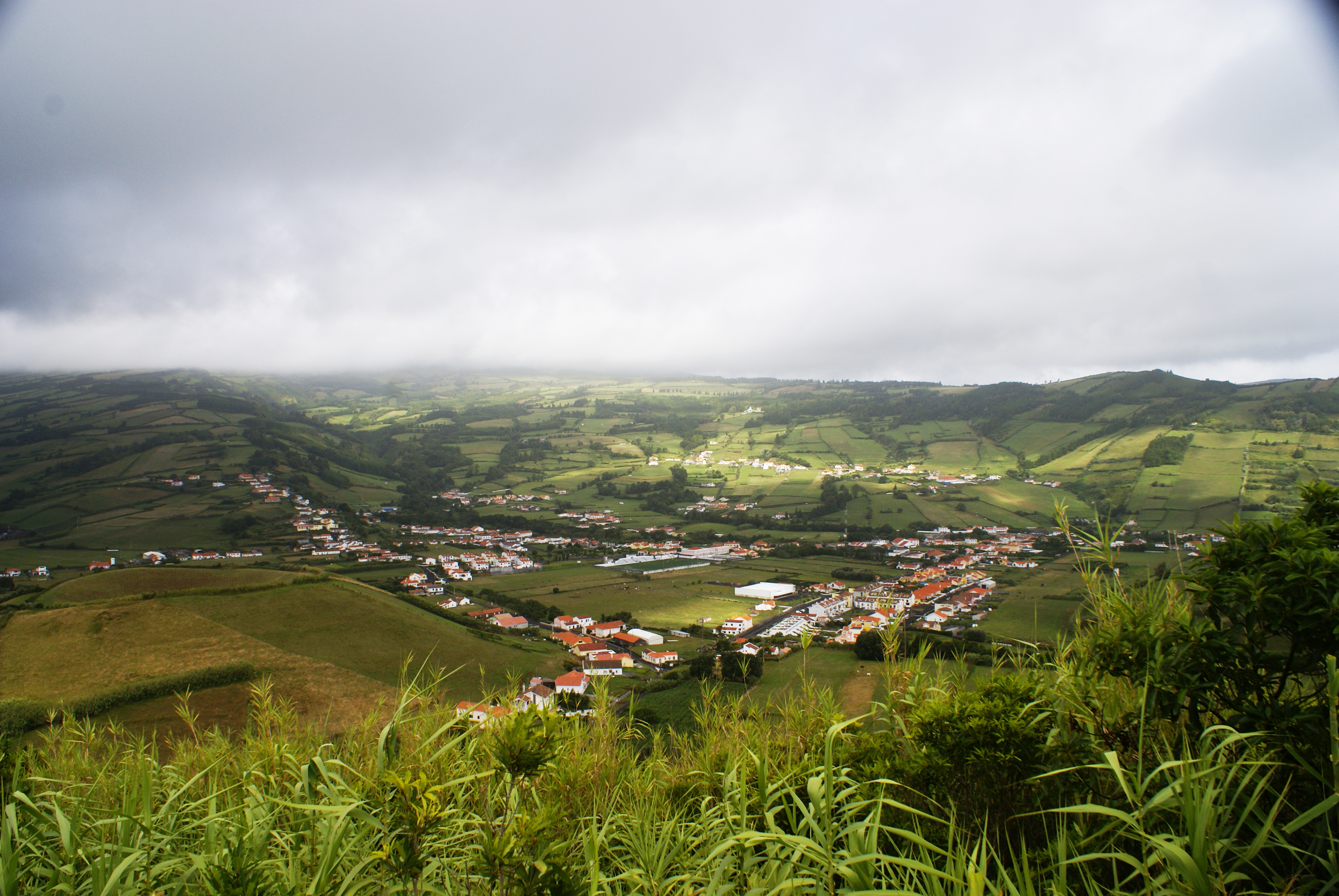
The valley of Flamengos, in the foothills of the central caldera, as seen from Monte Carneiro

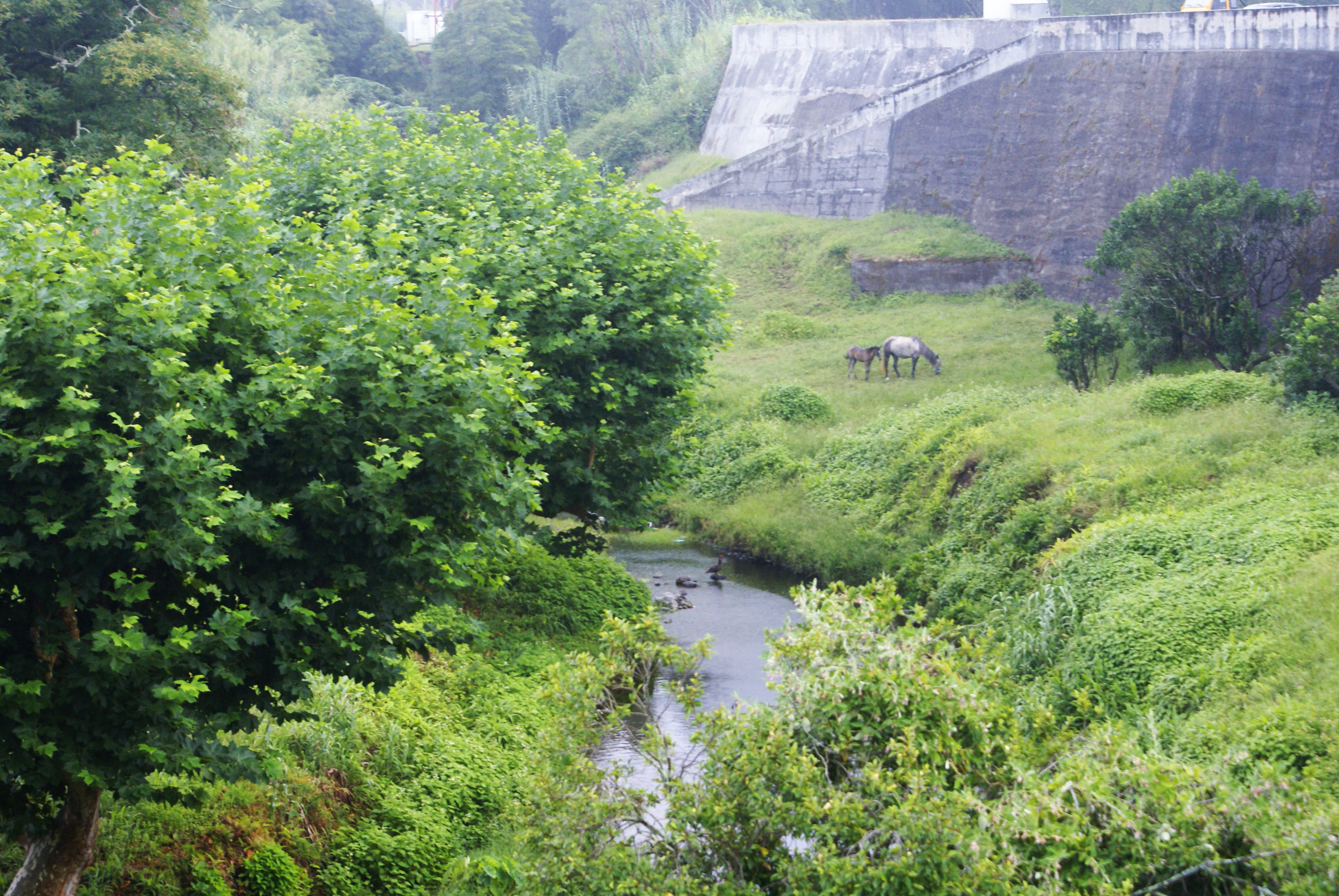
The Ribeira dos Flamengos, a constant water source for early settlers

Flamengos is located about 5 minutes (and 5 kilometers) from the centre of Horta, via several ancillary roadways along the eastern and southern margins of the Atlantic Ocean. The Flamengos valley is an "amphitheater"-shaped area, relatively planar and intersected by ravines that extend from the slopes of the Cabeço do Fogo.

Farmlands dominate the eastern areas and the Flamengos valley, although the flanks of the mountain are used as pastureland and forests. Much of the population is employed in agriculture business, primarily dairy production.

=== Ecoregions/protected areas ===
- Parque Florestal de Falca (English: Forest Park of Falca)

== Economy ==
The agricultural characteristics of the parish are well known and in cases represent the characteristics of Beiras and Beiras e Trás-os-Montes. The chimneys represent the typical characteristics of southern Portugal.

== Architecture ==
=== Civic ===
- Fountain of the Bicas (Portuguese: Fontanário das Bicas), located along the Rua do Capitão was a public fountain used until 1852; it was one of the few fountains used as a public laundry, used communally by the residents of the village, and may have pre-dated the creation of the parish;
- Bridge of Flamengos (Portuguese: Ponte dos Flamengos), this bridge, another symbol of early 20th Century construction, was begun in 1903 and completed by 1908.
- Estate of São Lourenço (Portuguese: Quinta de São Lourenço), the old property of Tomás de Porra Pereira, former Captain-Donatorio of Faial, and recently transferred to the islands's Serviços Agrários do Faial (English: Agrarian Services of Faial), where for many years it has been used as the location of the island's fairs, expositions, folklore festivals and other activities.
- Botanical Garden of Faial (Portuguese: Jardim Botânico do Faial), an interpretative center for common endemic and endangered plants, as well as many varieties of medicinal herbs, used by local residents on the island;

=== Religious ===
- Hermitage of São João Baptista (Portuguese: Ermida de São João Baptista), the chapel is located at a junction of the Estrada da Caldeira (Largo Jaime Melo-Estrada da Ribeira Funda) in the foothills of the central caldera, an access that islanders traditionally used for pilgrimages (Portuguese: romarias) to the caldera on the feast day of John the Baptist (24 June). The erection of a hermitage/chapel came from Manuel da Silveira Brum (who had a summer residence there) and the parish vicar Father João Goulart Cardoso. From the placing of the cornerstone (24 June 1921) the responsibility for the chapel's construction fell to the proprietor and was supported by donations from the local congregation. But the project ran slowly, then stopped in 1925, before being restarted by a stipend from José Rodrigues de Amaral, before his death. In 1944 the chapel was concluded, and blessed on the annual feast day by Father António S. de Medeiros, and the first mass held by Father Goulart Cardoso. The isolated chapel is constructed from basaltic stone in the form of a central nave and tower (constructed over the main entranceway).

== Culture ==
Traditionally, Flamengos has been the centre of annual São João da Caldeira celebrations (or simply Festas de São João) on the island, held on 23–24 June. These festivals, which have occurred popularly since the 15th-16th century, included pilgrimages from around the island that journeyed to the central caldera, where they would play music, danced and jumped bonfires during the quasi-religious festivities. While the religious pilgrimages were discontinued, the annual festivities continued as a social event with popular marches, food kiosks, picnicking, dances and the community Fogueira de São João (bonfire) highlighting the celebration around midnight. Meanwhile, the following day (24 June) is a municipal holiday (island-wide), that includes a mid-day eucharistic celebration at the hermitage of São João (along the intersection of the Estrada Regional E.R.1-2ª and Rua da Caldeira, midway towards the summit of the caldera). A community lunch, that includes sardines, musical groups, popular marches, exhibitions, traditional folklore dances are held within the shadow of the small chapel, and rounds out the celebrations.

The Sociedade Filarmónica Nova Artista Flamenguese (English: Philharmonic Society New Flemish Artists), founded on 23 January 1881, was the first band established in Flamengos. Between 1899 and 1912, its musical director was Maestro Francisco Xavier Simaria, but today Mário Francisco Leal Abreu is currently conducting the brass band. Besides this, there is the Tuna e Grupo Folclórico Juvenil dos Flamengos (English: Flamengos Chorus and Youth Folklore Group) was founded in 1978 by António da Luz Rodrigues, who served as its director, which recently (1 March 1999) established an ancillary group, the Grupo de Cantares Sons do Vale (English: Singing Group Sons of the Valley).
