= List of lighthouses in Portugal =

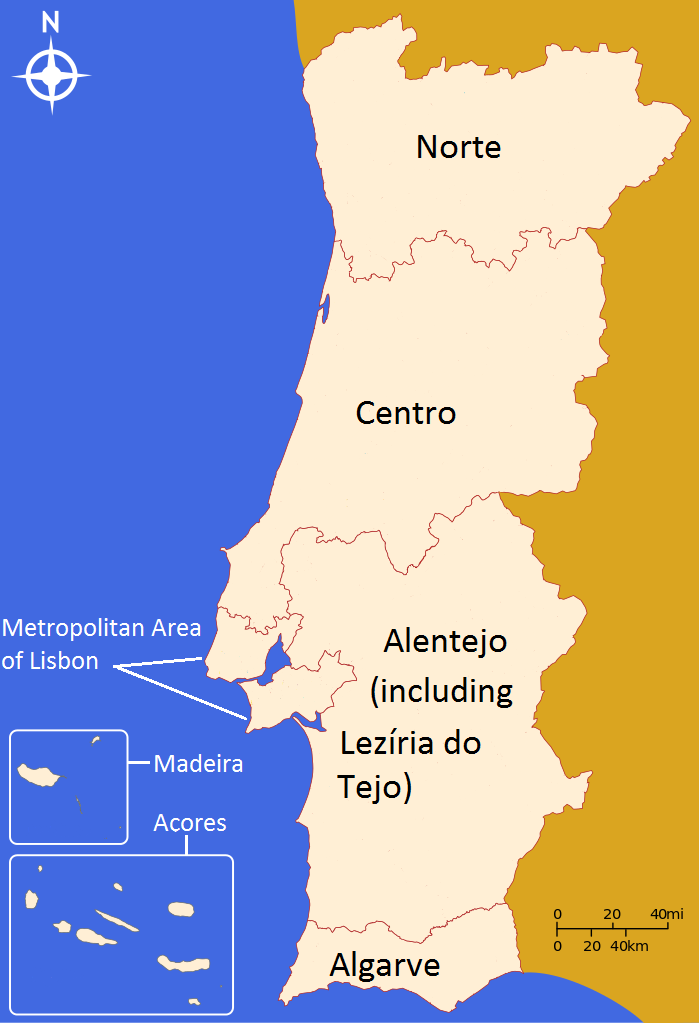
Territorial map showing the regions of Portugal and the two autonomous regions of the Azores and Madeira

This is an alphabetical list of lighthouses in Portugal and its autonomous regions.

== Norte ==
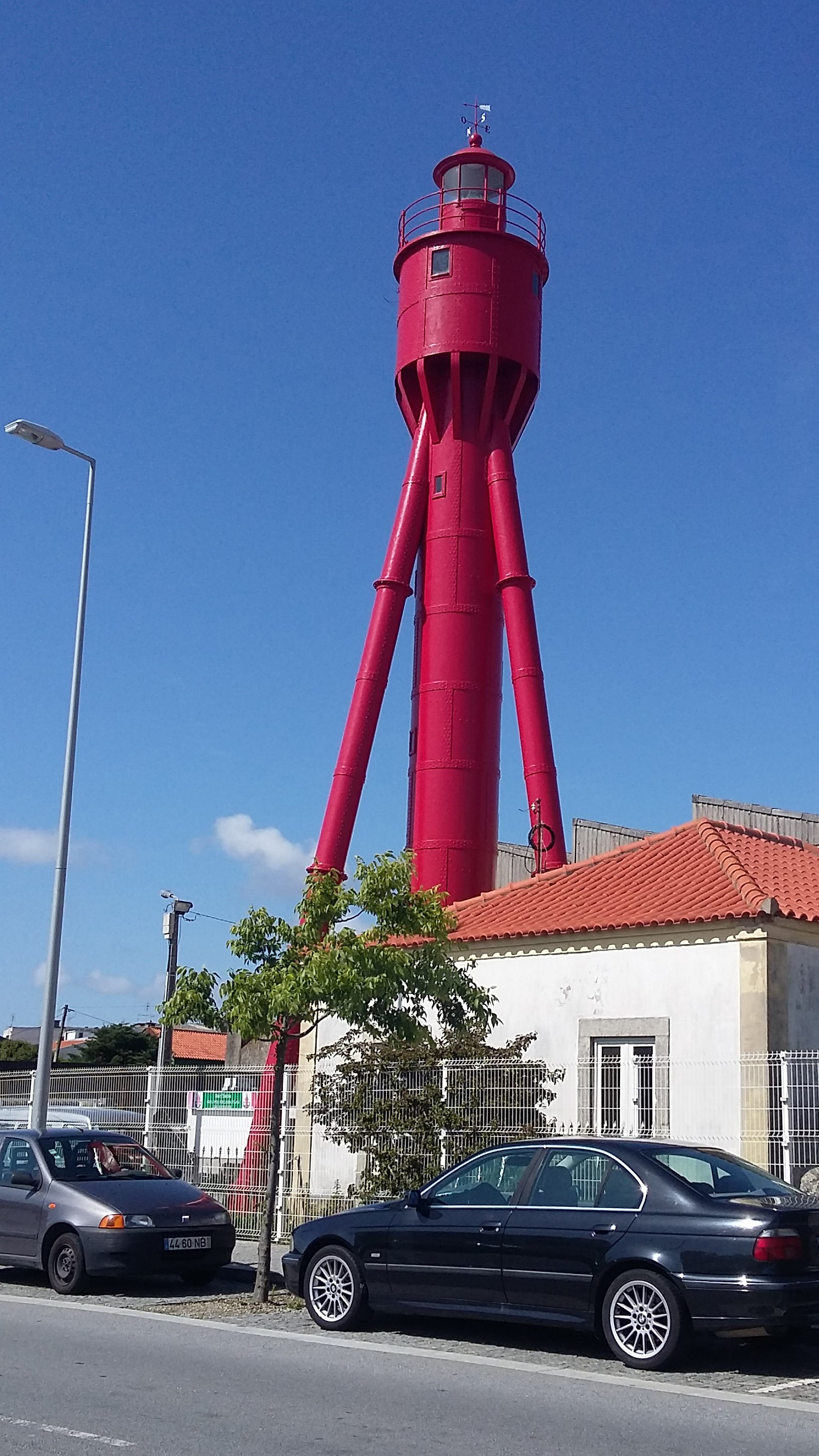
The modernist-style lighthouse in Póvoa de Varzim, known as the Farol de Regufe

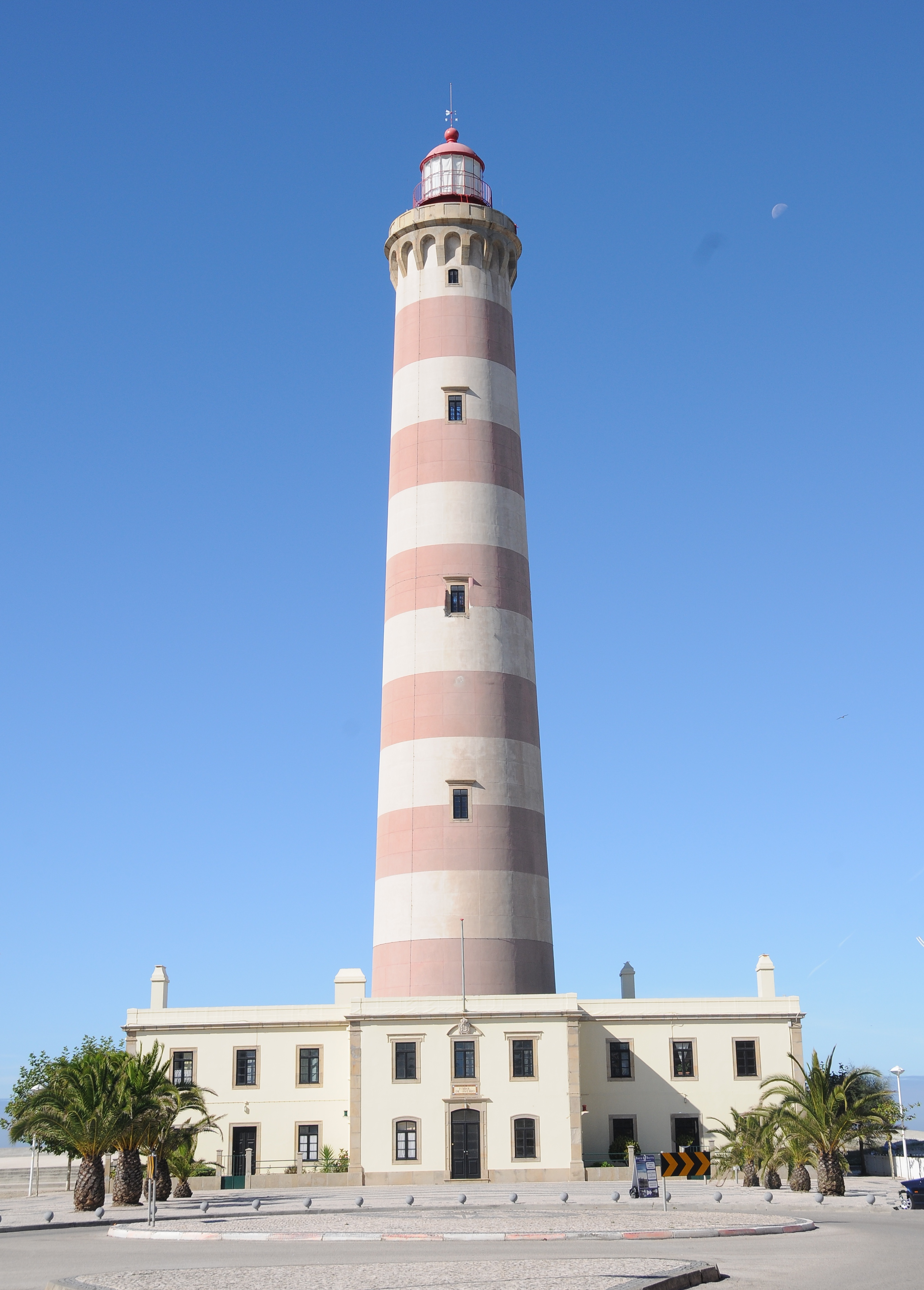
The tallest lighthouse in Portugal, the Farol de Praia da Barra, is situated on the coast of Gafanha da Nazaré.

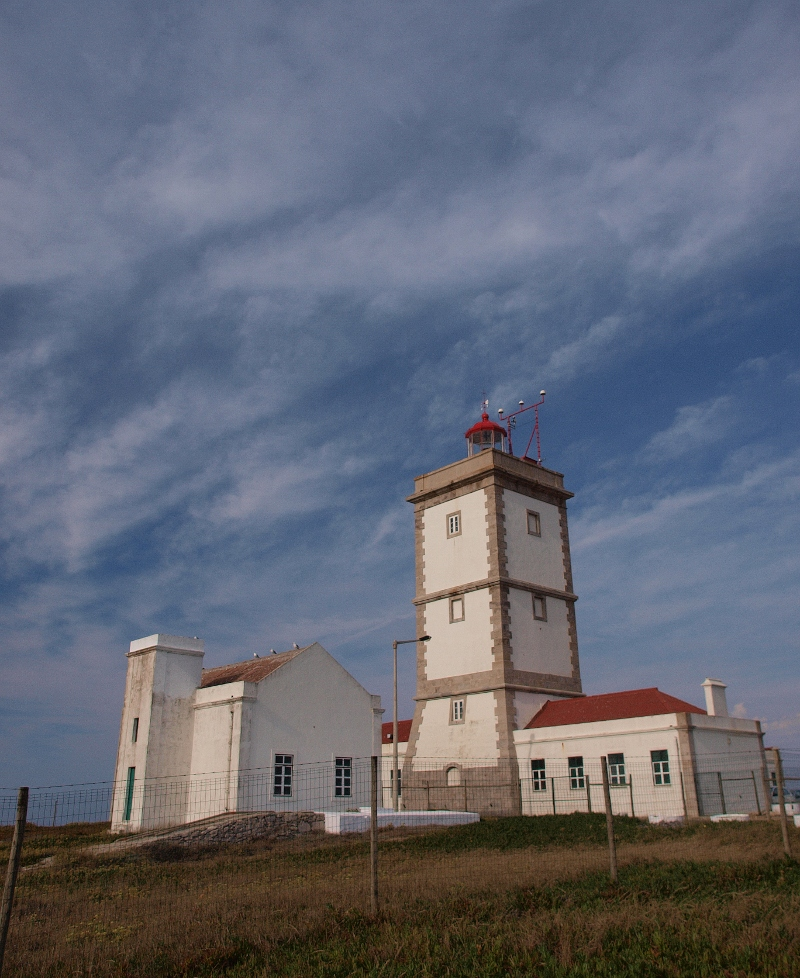
The original Farol de Cabo Carvoeiro was found inadequate in 1881, and was reconstructed starting in 1886.

- Casa do Facho em Fão (Esposende, Apúlia e Fão)
- Farol de Azurara (Vila do Conde, Azurara)
- Farol de Esposende (Esposende, Esposende, Marinhas e Gandra)
- Farol da Ínsua (Caminha, Moledo e Cristelo)
- Farol da Lapa (Póvoa de Varzim, Póvoa de Varzim, Beiriz e Argivai
- Farol de Leça/Farol da Boa Nova (Matosinhos, Matosinhos e Leça da Palmeira)
- Farol de Montedor (Viana do Castelo, Carreço)
- Farol do Portinho da Fragosa (Póvoa de Varzim)
- Farol de São Miguel-O-Anjo (Porto, Aldoar, Foz do Douro e Nevogilde)
- Farol da Senhora da Agonia (Viana do Castelo, Viana do Castelo (Santa Maria Maior e Monserrate) e Meadela)
- Farol da Senhora da Luz (Porto, Aldoar, Foz do Douro e Nevogilde)
- Farol de Regufe (Póvoa de Varzim, Póvoa de Varzim, Beiriz e Argivai)
- Farolim da Barra do Ave/Facho de Árvore (Vila do Conde, Árvore)
- Farolim da Cantareira (Porto, Aldoar, Foz do Douro e Nevogilde)
- Farolim de Enfiamento do Portinho da Fragosa (Póvoa de Varzim)
- Farolim de Felgueiras (Porto, Aldoar, Foz do Douro e Nevogilde)
- Farolim do Molhe Norte do Porto da Póvoa de Varzim (Póvoa de Varzim)
- Farolim do Molhe Sul do Porto da Póvoa de Varzim (Póvoa de Varzim)
- Farolim de Santiago (Viana do Castelo, Viana do Castelo (Santa Maria Maior e Monserrate) e Meadela)
- Farolim das Sobreiras (Porto, Lordelo do Ouro e Massarelos)
- Farolim de Vila do Conde

Nine-second video of lighting system in operation at Cape Espichel lighthouse

== Centro ==
- Farol do Cabo Carvoeiro (Peniche, Peniche)
- Farol do Cabo Mondego/Farol de Buarcos (Figueira da Foz, Quiaios)
- Farol da Chibata (Almada, Caparica e Trafaria)
- Farol da Ilha da Berlenga/Farol Duque de Bragança (Peniche, Peniche)
- Farol da Nazaré (Nazaré, Nazaré)
- Farol do Penedo da Saudade (Marinha Grande, Marinha Grande)
- Farol de Praia da Barra (Ílhavo, Gafanha da Nazaré)
- Farol de Santa Catarina (Figueira da Foz, Buarcos)

== Lisboa ==
- Farol da Azeda (Setúbal, Setúbal (São Sebastião))
- Farol do Bugio (Oeiras, Oeiras e São Julião da Barra, Paço de Arcos e Caxias)
- Farol do Cabo da Roca (Sintra, Colares)
- Farol do Cabo Raso (Cascais e Estoril)
- Farol de Cacilhas (Almada, Almada, Cova da Piedade, Pragal e Cacilhas). The lighthouse is disused but retained for cultural reasons
- Farol do Cabo Espichel (Sesimbra)
- Farol do Esteiro (Oeiras, Algés, Linda-a-Velha e Cruz Quebrada-Dafundo)
- Farol do Forte do Cavalo, Sesimbra
- Farol da Gibalta (Oeiras, Oeiras e São Julião da Barra, Paço de Arcos e Caxias)
- Farol da Guia (Cascais, Cascais e Estoril)
- Farol da Mama (Oeiras, Carnaxide e Queijas)
- Farol do Outão, Setúbal
- Farol de Santa Marta (Cascais, Cascais e Estoril)
- Farol de São Julião (Oeiras, Oeiras e São Julião da Barra, Paço de Arcos e Caxias)

== Alentejo ==
- Farol do Cabo Sardão (Odemira, São Teotónio)
- Farol do Cabo de Sines (Sines, Sines)

== Algarve ==
- Farol de Albufeira (Albufeira, Albufeira e Olhos de Água)
- Farol de Alfanzina (Lagoa, Lagoa e Carvoeiro)
- Farol do Cabo de Santa Maria (Faro, Faro (Sé e São Pedro))
- Farol do Cabo de São Vicente (Vila do Bispo, Sagres)
- Farol da Ponta do Altar (Lagoa, Ferragudo)
- Farol da Ponta da Piedade (Lagos, Lagos (São Sebastião e Santa Maria))
- Farolim de Sagres/Farol da Ponte de Sagres (Vila do Bispo, Sagres)
- Vila Real de Santo António Lighthouse (Vila Real de Santo António, Vila Real de Santo António)
- Farol de Vilamoura/Farolim de Vilamoura (Loulé, Quarteira)

== Azores ==
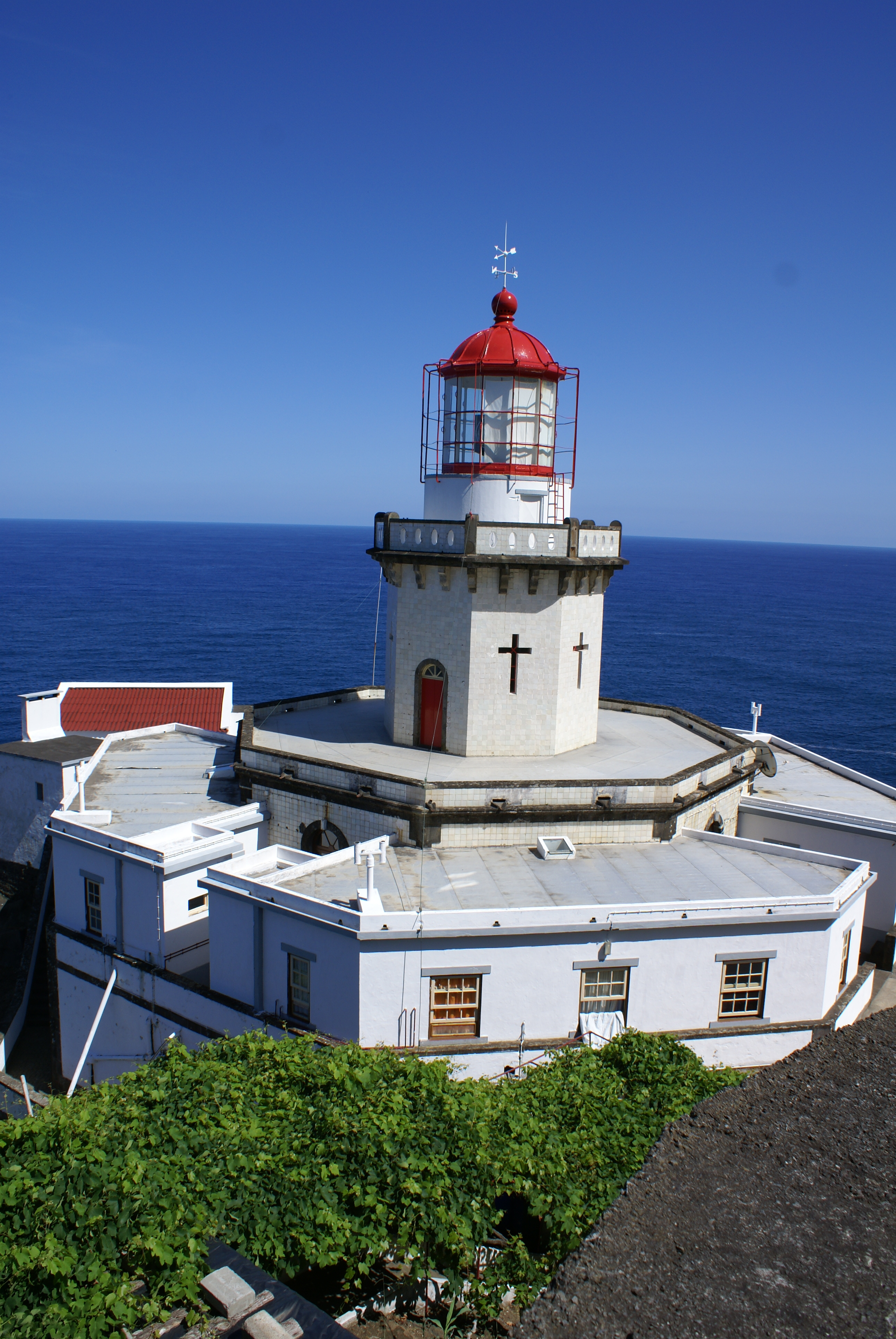
The octagonal lighthouse of Ponta do Arnel on the eastern coast of São Miguel Island

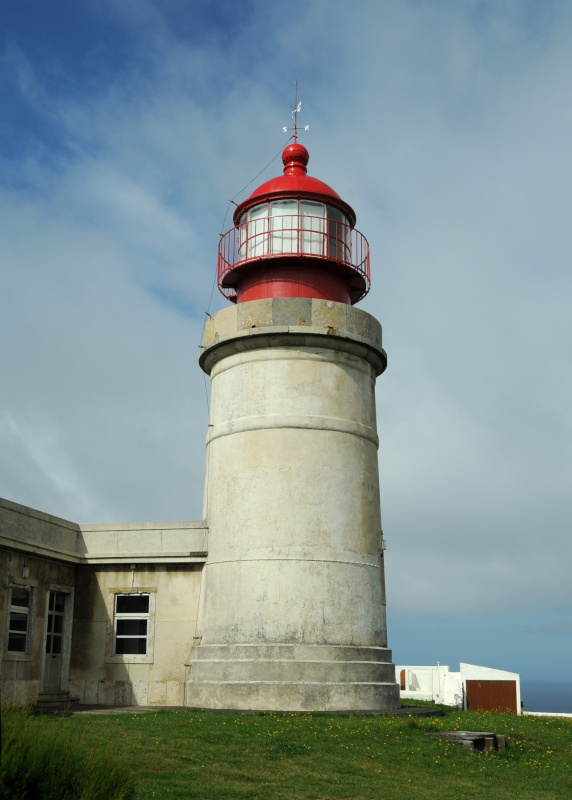
The massive cylindrical tower of the Farol de Ponta do Albarnaz on the northern coast of Flores

Corvo

- Farol da Ponta Negra (Vila do Corvo)
- Farol do Canto da Carneira (Vila do Corvo)

Faial

- Farol da Ribeirinha (Horta, Ribeirinha)
- Farol de Horta (Horta, Angústias)
- Farol de Vale Formoso (Horta, Capelo)
- Farol de Ponta dos Capelinhos (Horta, Capelo)

Flores

- Farol da Ponta das Lajes (Lajes das Flores, Lajes das Flores)
- Farol de Ponta do Albarnaz (Santa Cruz das Flores, Ponta Delgada)

Graciosa

- Farol do Carapacho/Farol da Ponta da Restinga (Santa Cruz da Graciosa, Santa Cruz da Graciosa)
- Farol do Forte do Santo (Santa Cruz da Graciosa, Santa Cruz da Graciosa)
- Farol da Ponta da Barca (Santa Cruz da Graciosa, Luz)

Pico

- Farol da Ponta da Ilha (Lajes do Pico, Piedade)
- Farol da Ponta de São Mateus (Madalena, São Mateus)
- Farol da Madalena (Madalena, Madalena)

Santa Maria

- Farol de Gonçalo Velho/Farol da Maia (Vila do Porto, Santo Espírito)
- Farol das Formigas (Vila do Porto, Vila do Porto)
- Farol de Vila do Porto (Vila do Porto, Vila do Porto)

São Jorge

- Farol da Ponta do Topo (Calheta, Topo (Nossa Senhora do Rosário)
- Farol da Calheta Calheta, Calheta)
- Farol do Cais de Velas
- Farol de Velas
- Farol da Ponta dos Rosais (Velas, Rosais)

São Miguel

- Farol da Ponta do Arnel (Nordeste, Nordeste)
- Farol de Ponta Garça (Vila Franca do Campo, Ponta Garça)
- Farol de Varadouro
- Farol de Ponta Delgada
- Farol de Santa Clara (Ponta Delgada, Santa Clara)
- Farol da Ferraria (Ponta Delgada, Ginetes)
- Farol de Rabo de Peixe
- Farol da Ponta do Cintrão (Riberia Grande, Ribeirinha)

Terceira

- Farol da Praia da Vitória
- Farol das Contendas (Angra do Heroísmo, Porto Judeu)
- Farol de Angra do Heroísmo
- Farol da Serreta (Angra do Heroísmo, Serreta)

== Madeira ==
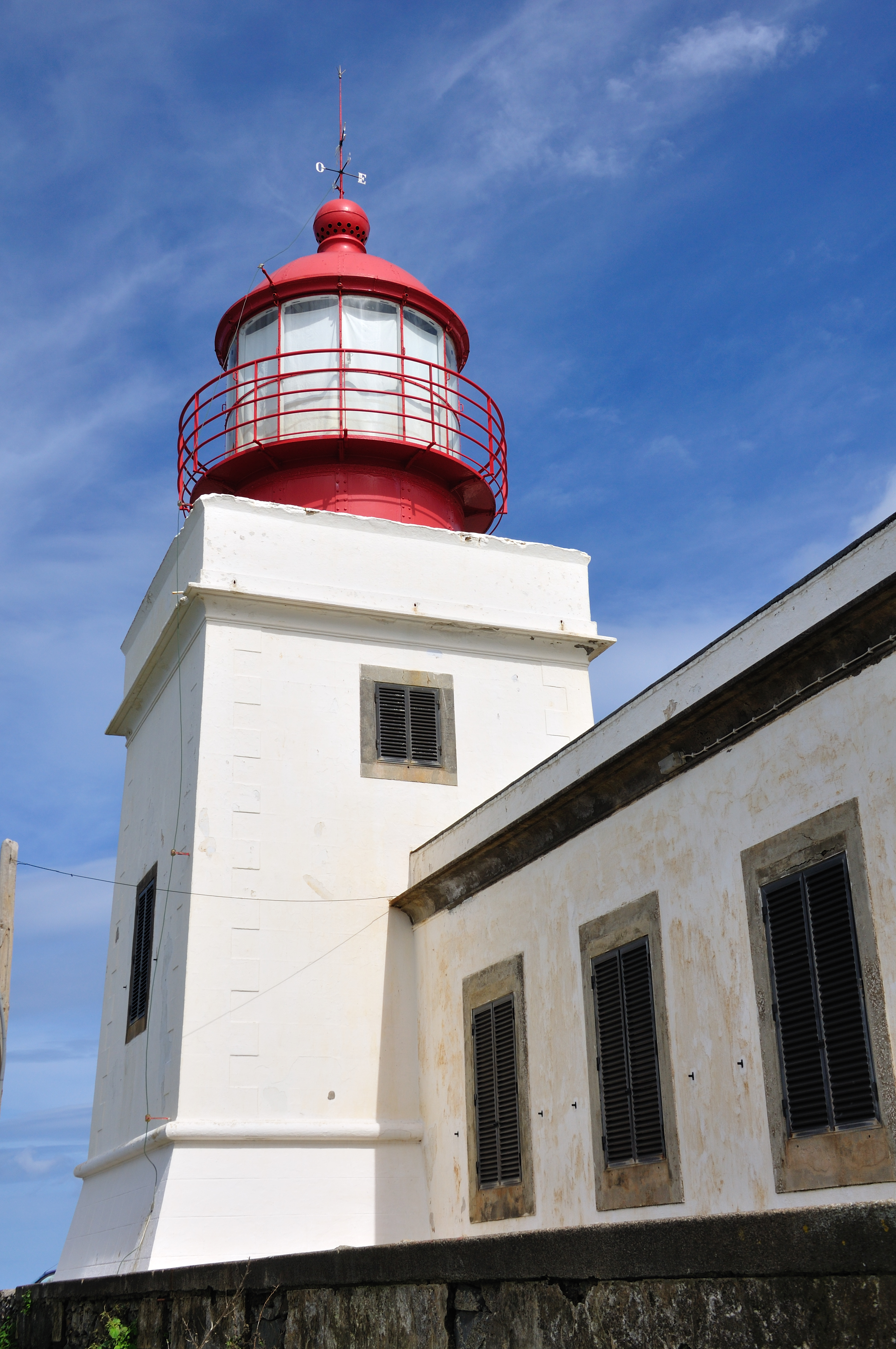
Farol da Ponta do Pargo

Madeira

- Farol de São Lourenço/Farol da Ponta de São Lourenço (Machico, Caniçal)
- Farol do Funchal (molhe)
- Farol de Câmara de Lobos
- Farol da Ribeira Brava
- Farol da Ponta do Pargo (Calheta, Ponta do Pargo)
- Farol do Porto Moniz/Farolim do Ilhéu Mole (Porto Moniz, Porto Moniz)
- Farol da Ponta de São Jorge (Santana, São Jorge)

Porto Santo

- Farol do Ilhéu de Cima (Porto Santo, Porto Santo)
- Farol de Porto Santo Molhe Norte
- Farol de Porto Santo Molhe Sul
- Farol do Ilhéu do Ferro (Porto Santo, Porto Santo)

Desertas Islands

- Farol do Ilhéu Chão
- Farol da Ponta da Agulha

Savage Islands

- Farol da Selvagem Grande/Farolim da Selvagem Grande (Funchal, Sé)
- Farol da Selvagem Pequena/Farolim da Selvagem Pequena (Funchal, Sé)

== See also ==
- Lists of lighthouses and lightvessels
- Directorate of Lighthouses, Portugal

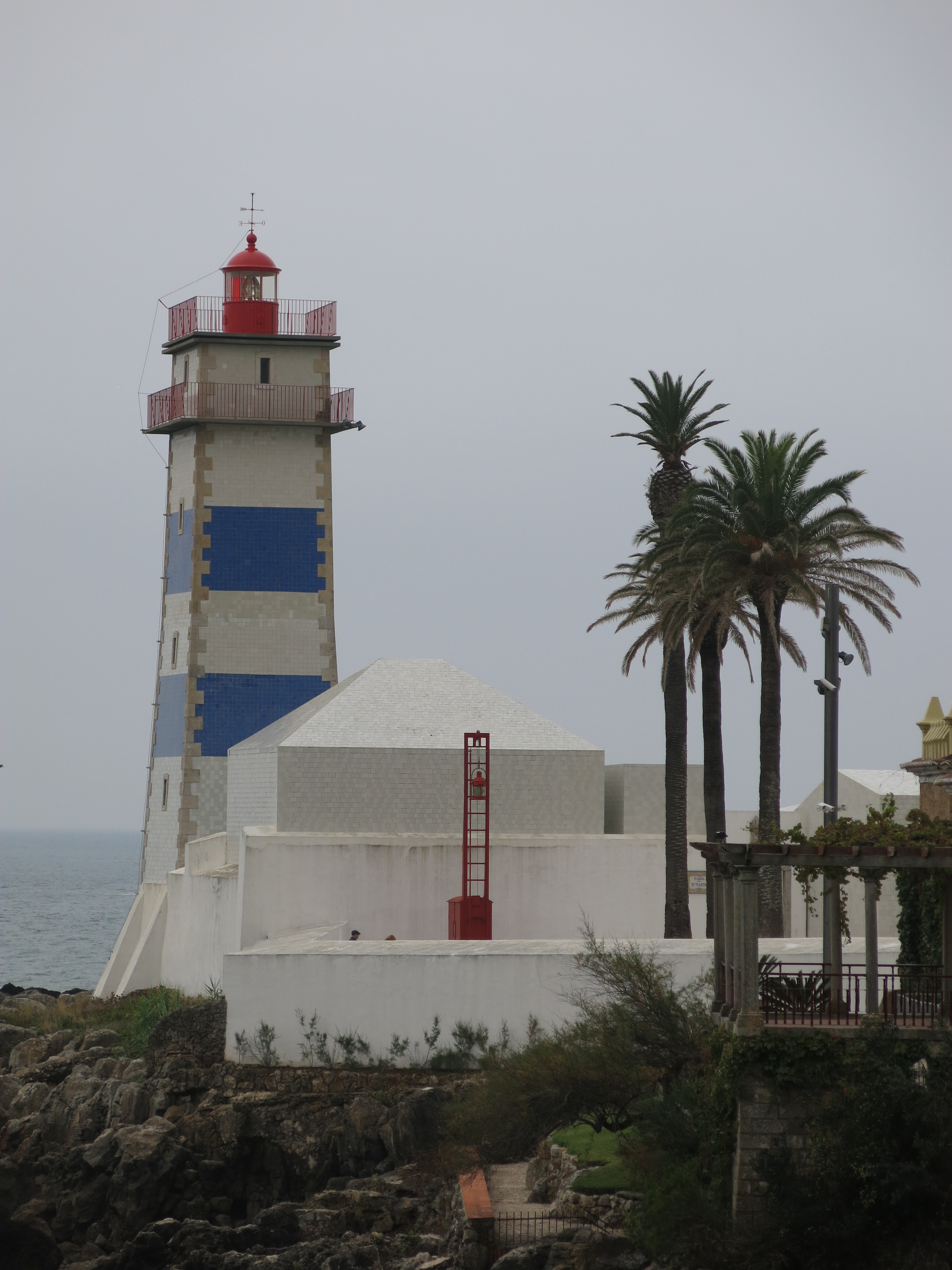
Lighthouse museum at Santa Marta Lighthouse (Cascais)
