= Penedo da Saudade Lighthouse =

Lighthouse on the Atlantic coast near Leiria, Portugal

Penedo da Saudade Lighthouse Farol do Penedo da Saudade
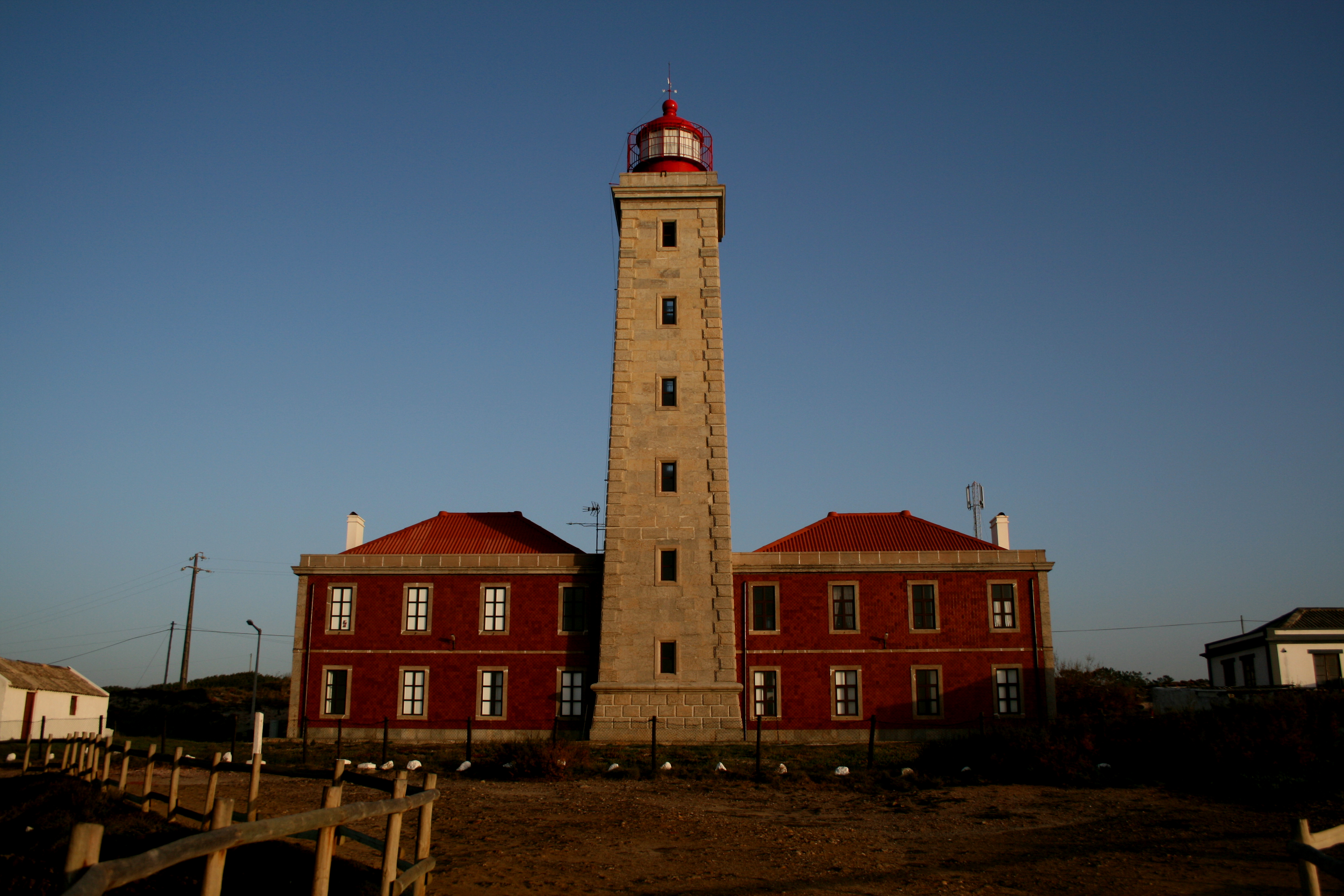
- Location: São Pedro de Moel, Leiria District, Portugal
- Coordinates: 39°45′51″N 9°01′52″W

Tower
- Constructed: 1912
- Construction: stone
- Automated: 1980
- Height: 32 metres (105 ft)
- Heritage: heritage without legal protection

Light
- Focal height: 55 m (180 ft)
- Lens: Third-order Fresnel 500mm
- Range: 30 nautical miles
- Characteristic: Fl (2) W 15s

The Penedo da Saudade Lighthouse (Portuguese: Farol do Penedo da Saudade) is located on the Atlantic coast in São Pedro de Moel, District of Leiria, Portugal. The functioning lighthouse was built in 1912 and takes its name from the cliff on which it was constructed.

The quadrangular tower is constructed of stone and masonry walls covered by brick tiles, and contains a spiral staircase. It is 32 metres high and the base is at 55 metres above sea level. The location was chosen to be approximately halfway between Berlenga Lighthouse to the south and Cabo Mondego Lighthouse to the north. Originally identified as being necessary during a survey in 1866, the location was not formally agreed until 1902 and construction did not begin until 1909. The Penedo da Saudade lighthouse started operations on February 15, 1912. At that time it was equipped with a rotating 3rd–order optical device with a 500mm focal length and the light was fuelled by oil vapour.

From March 1916 to December 1919 the light was extinguished due to World War I. From March to July 1921 it was also inactive as the lighting system was moved to the new Cape Mondego Lighthouse and was replaced by another 3rd–order device. At this time some improvements were also made to the tower and further changes were made in 1937. Generators were installed in 1947, necessitating construction of an engine house. Aeromarine panels were added in 1950. The lighthouse was not connected to the public grid until 1980, when an automation system was also installed. In 1947 the white lamp was 6000 watts but has progressively been reduced to one of 1000 watts. Technical difficulties were experienced in 1983 as a result of damage caused by a thunderstorm.

The lighthouse can be visited on Wednesday afternoons.

Storm Kristin caused severe damage to the lighthouse in January 2026.

== See also ==
- List of lighthouses in Portugal
