= Ribeira Brava Lighthouse =

Lighthouse in Portugal

Ribeira Brava Lighthouse Farol da Ribeira Brava
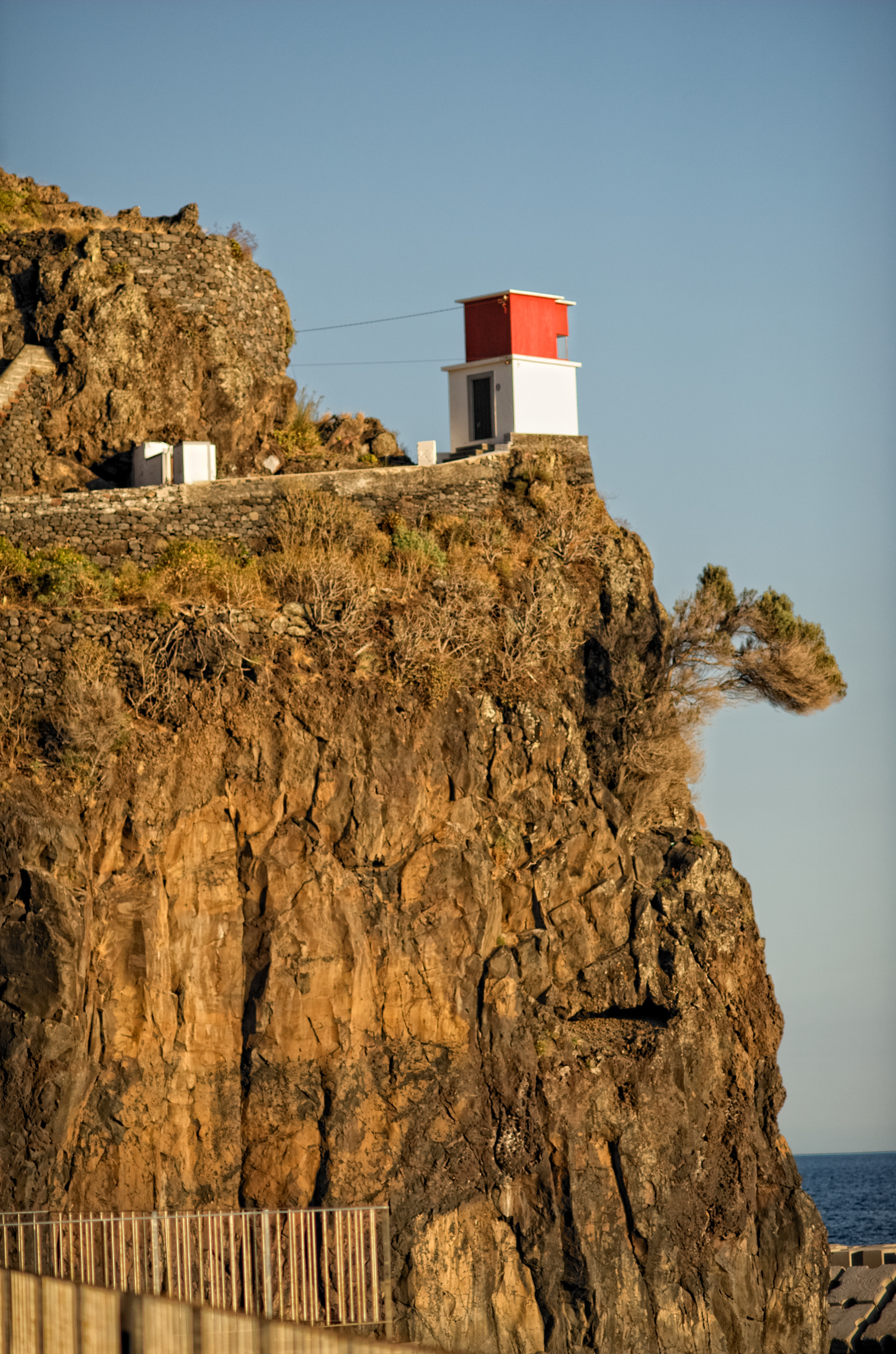
- Location: Ribeira Brava; Madeira; Portugal
- Coordinates: 32°40′07.77″N 17°03′52.96″W

Tower
- Constructed: 1930
- Construction: masonry tower
- Height: 6 metres (20 ft)
- Shape: square tower
- Markings: red tower, white trim
- Power source: mains electricity
- Heritage: heritage without legal protection

Light
- Focal height: 34 metres (112 ft)
- Range: 9 nmi (17 km; 10 mi)
- Characteristic: Fl R 5s.

The Farol da Ribeira Brava is a small lighthouse on the south coast of the island of Madeira, Portugal. The lighthouse was built in 1930 on top of a promontory at a focal height of 34 metres, located 16 km west of the city of Funchal.

== Gallery ==
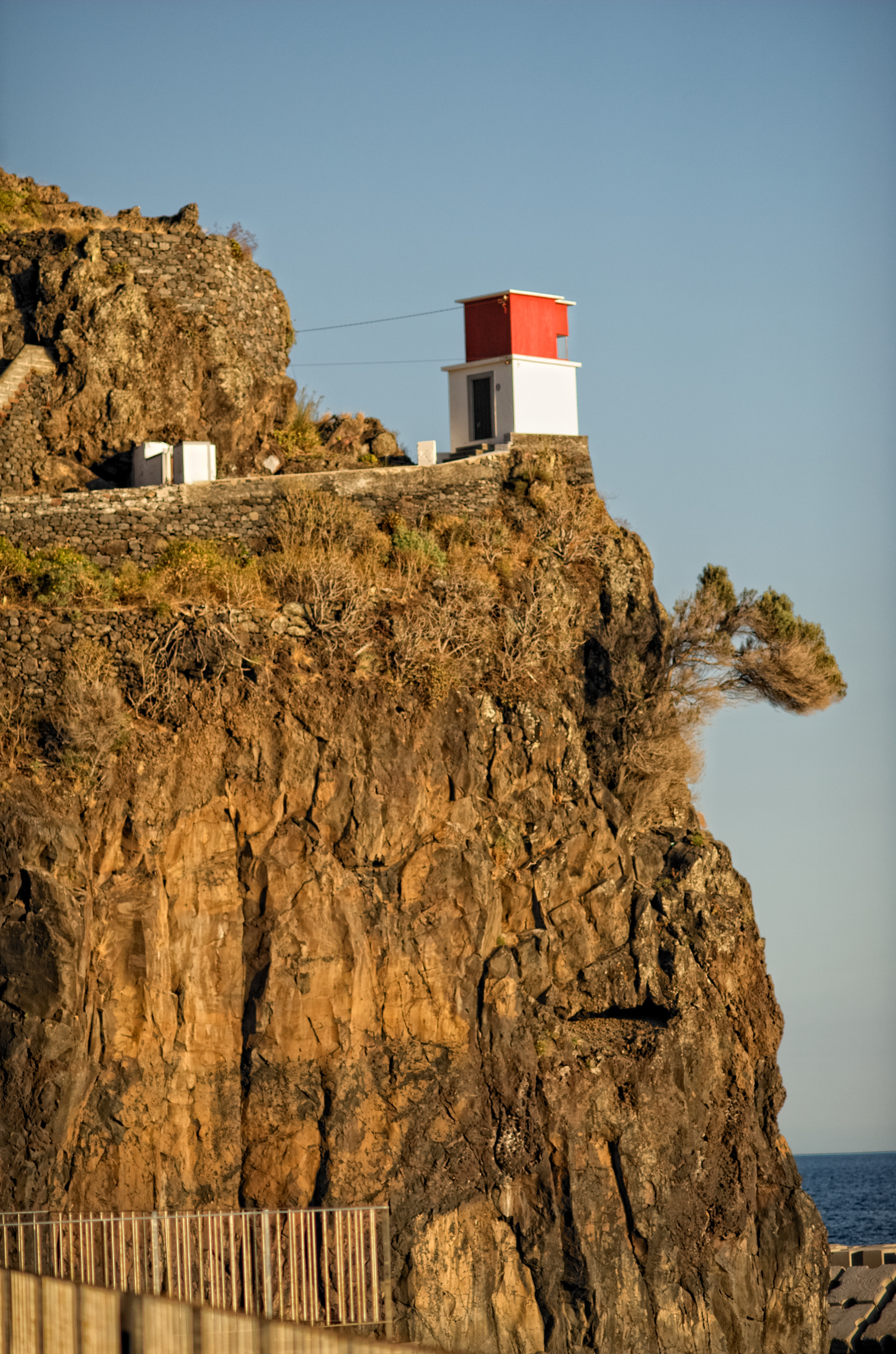

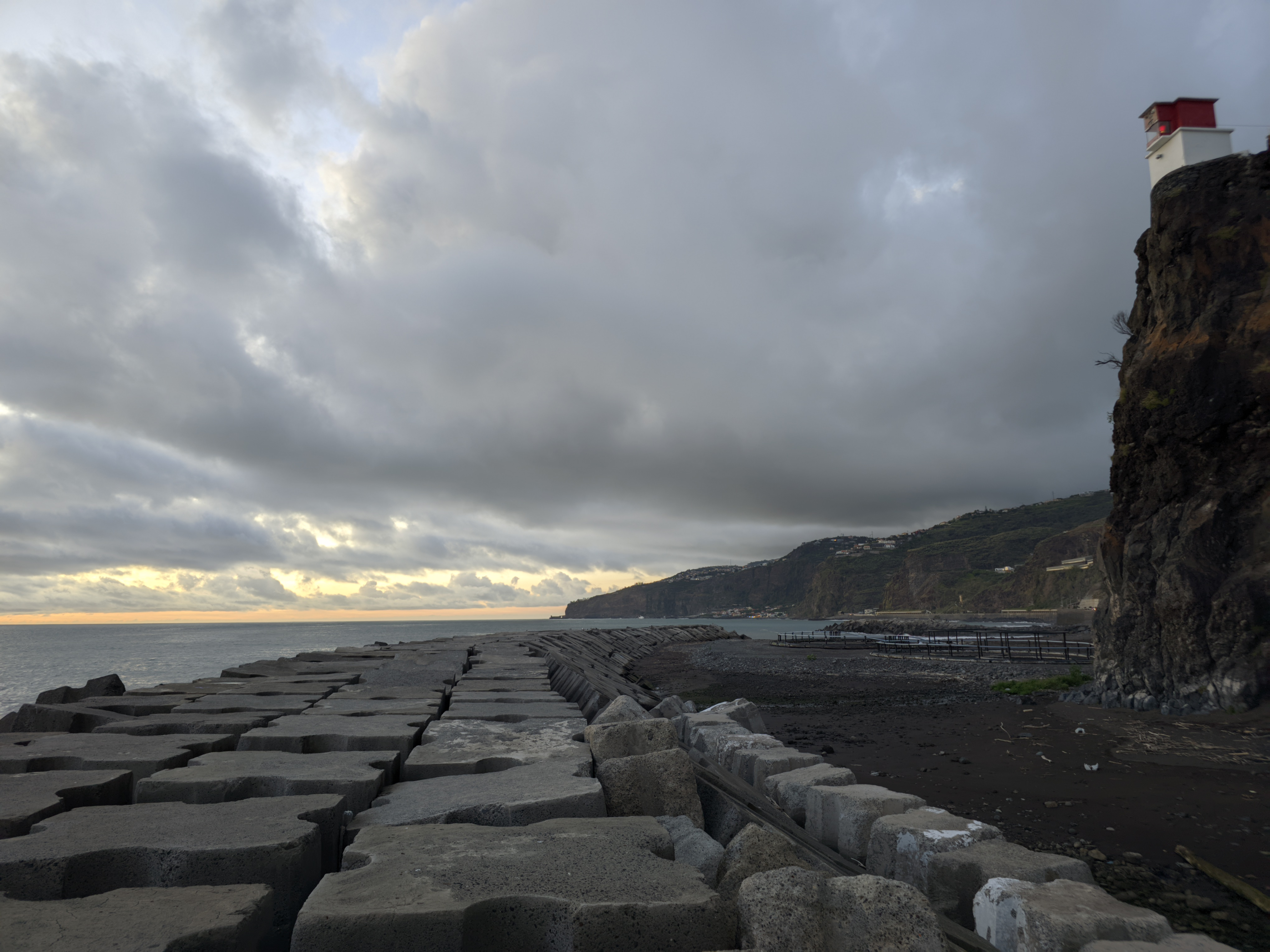

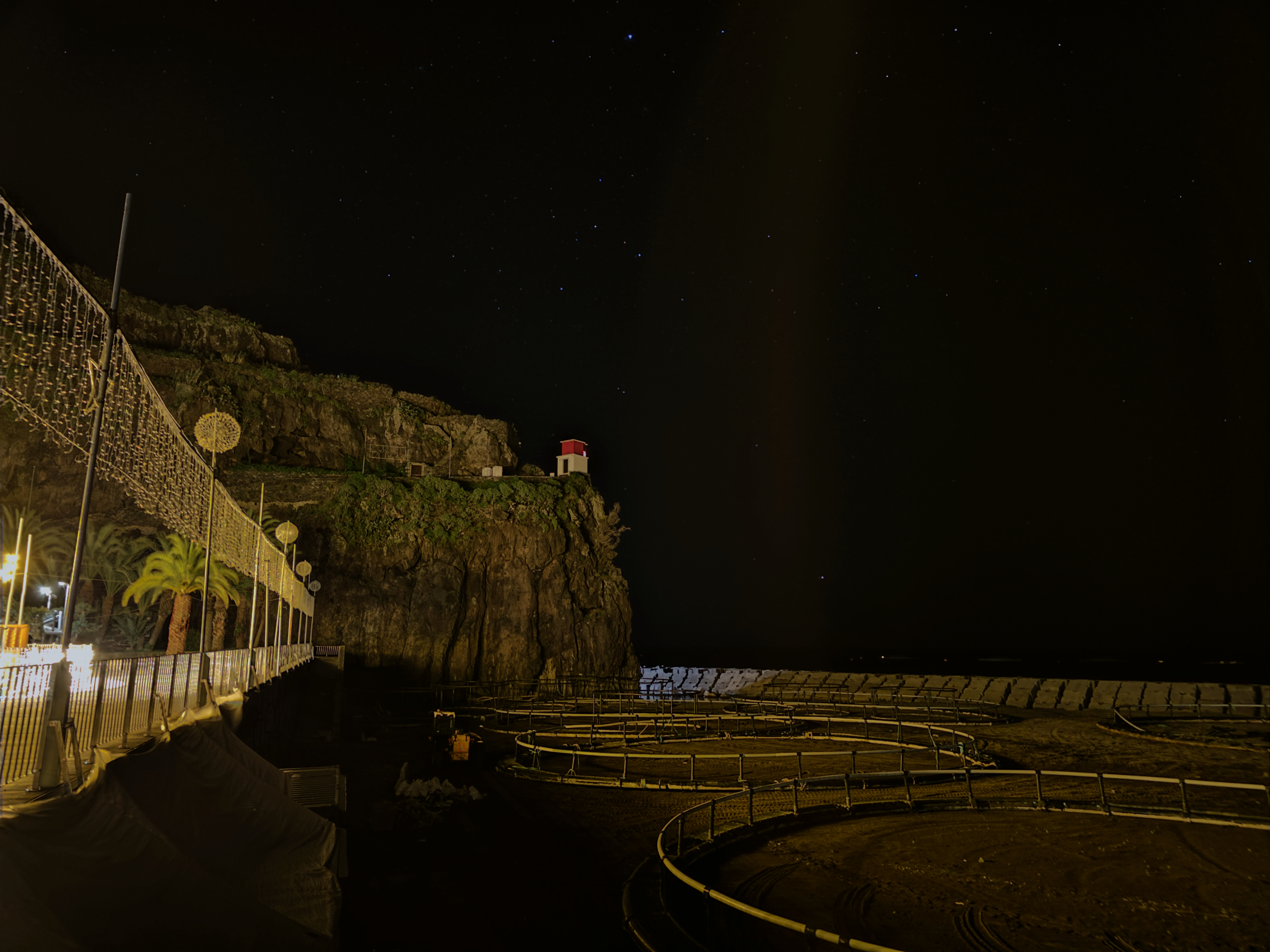

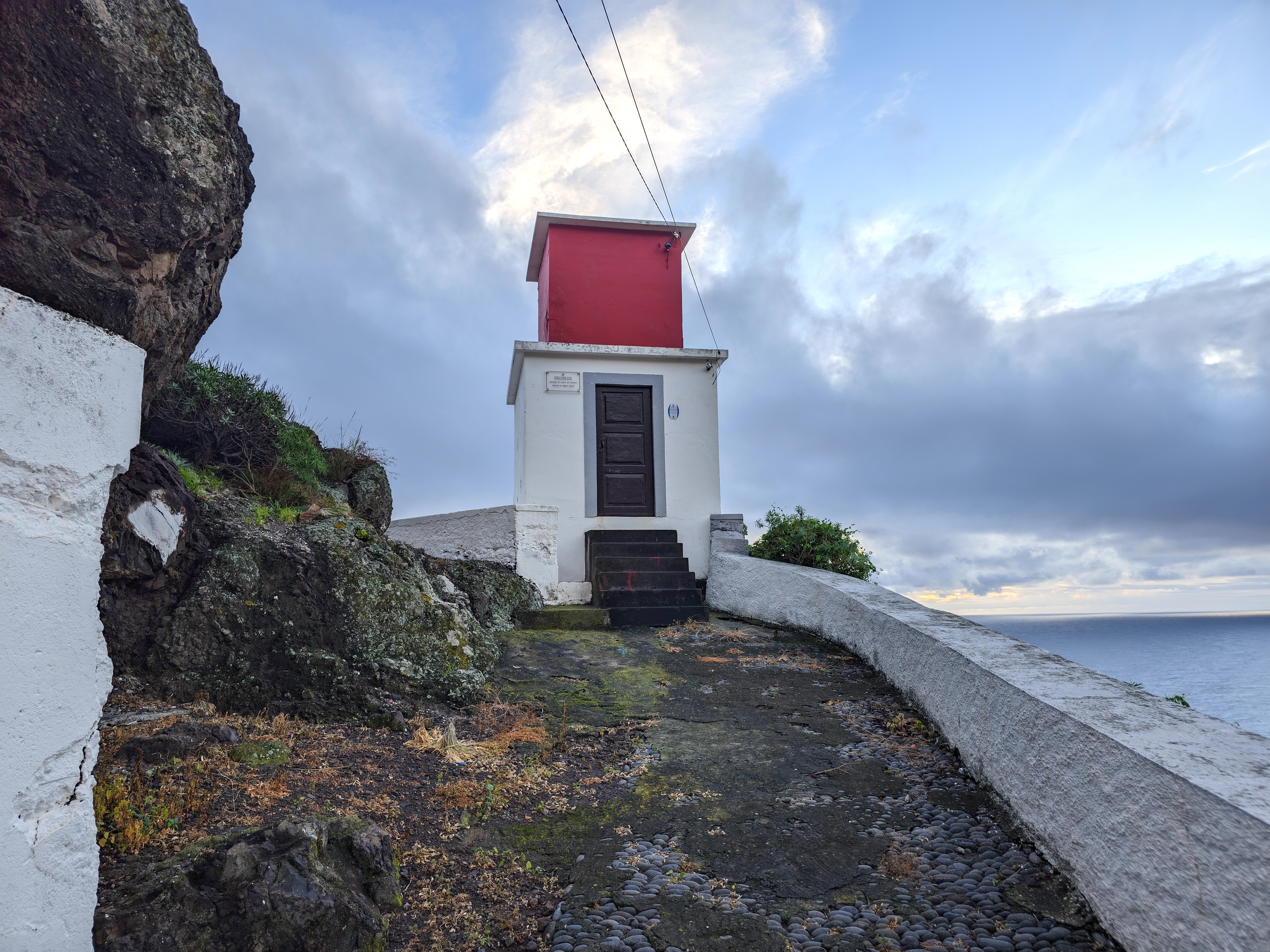

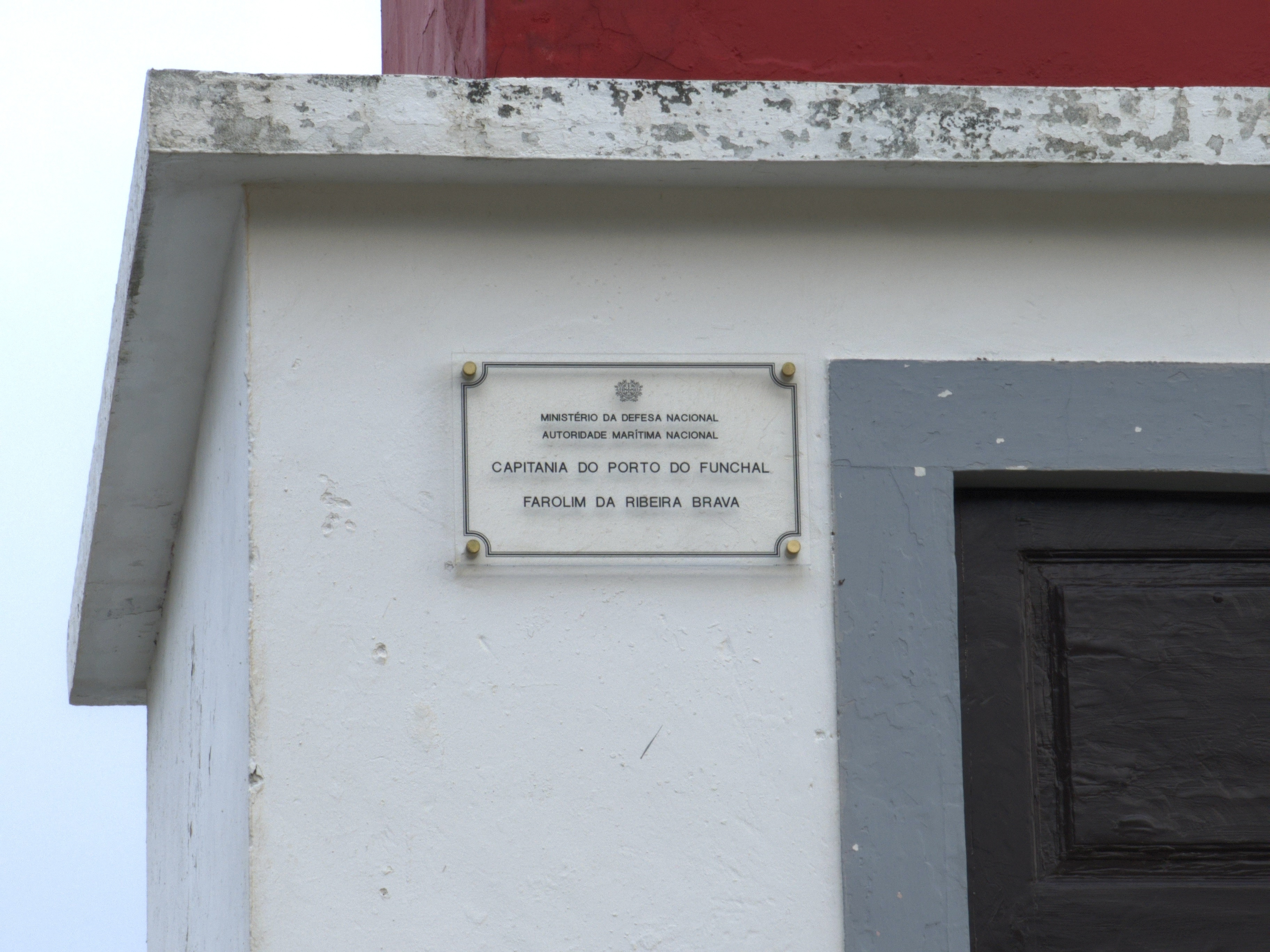

== See also ==
- List of lighthouses in Portugal
