= Ponta do Altar Lighthouse =

Lighthouse near Ferragudo, Portugal

Ponta do Altar Lighthouse Farol da Ponta do Altar
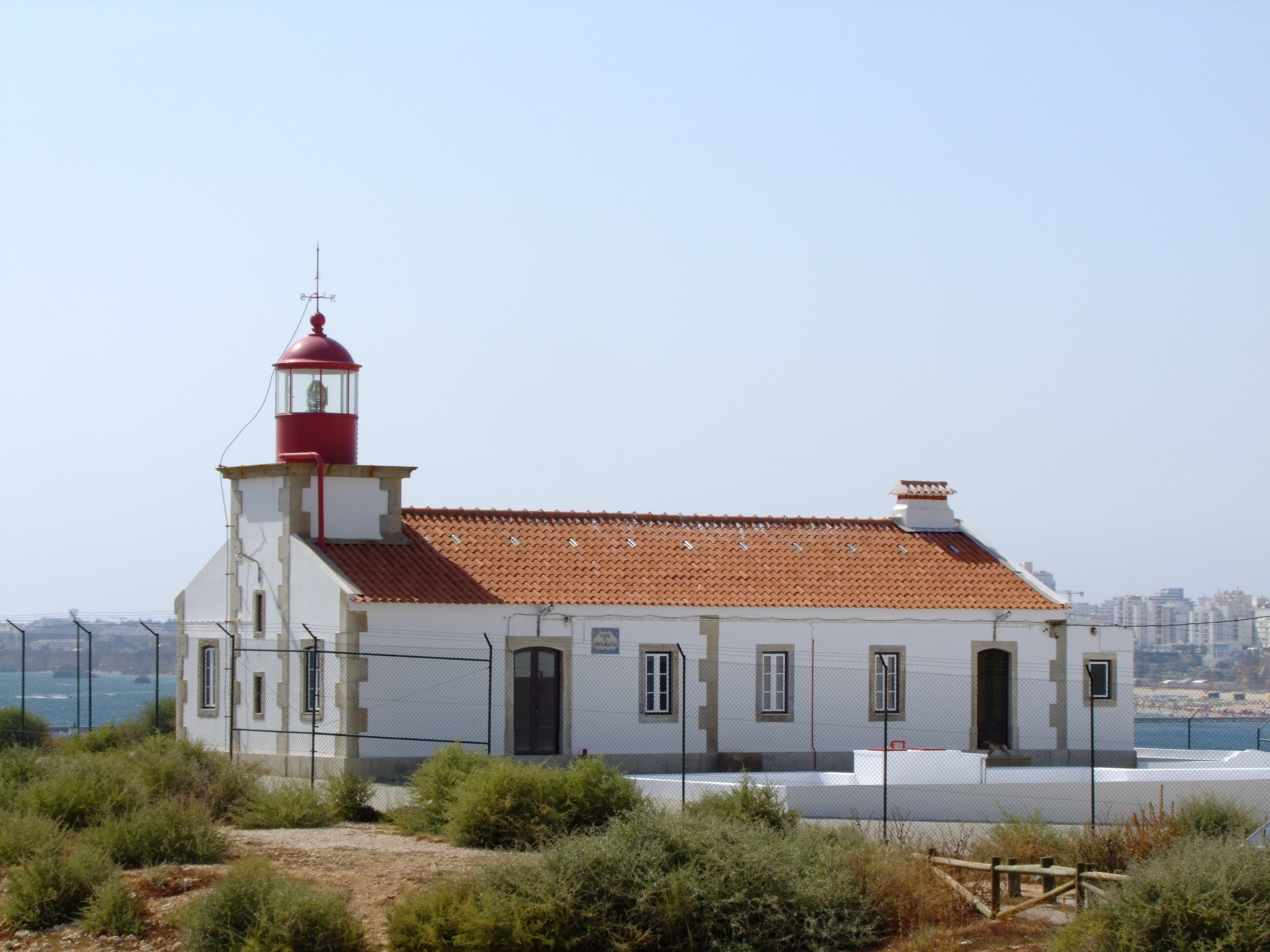
- Location: Ferragudo, Alentejo, Portugal
- Coordinates: 37°06′21″N 8°31′10″W

Tower
- Constructed: 1893
- Construction: stone
- Automated: 1992
- Height: 10 metres (33 ft)
- Shape: Square
- Operator: National Maritime Authority of Portugal (Autoridade Marítima Nacional)
- Heritage: heritage without legal protection

Light
- First lit: 1893
- Focal height: 32 metres (105 ft)
- Lens: Fifth-order Fresnel
- Light source: Electricity
- Intensity: 1000 watt
- Range: 16 nautical miles
- Characteristic: LFl W 5s
- Portugal no.: 475

The Ponta do Altar Lighthouse (Farol da Ponta do Altar) is located in the Ferragudo parish of the Lagoa municipality in the Faro District of Portugal.

The lighthouse, of unusual design, consists of a small square turret attached to a one-story caretaker's house. It supports a red lantern on its terrace. The house, often compared with the appearance of a small schoolhouse, is painted white, with exposed stones and a red tiled roof. It is located on a promontory, used since prehistory for pagan rituals, on the eastern side of the entrance to the port of Portimão, about 7 km south-west of Lagoa. In recent years the attractiveness of the site has been impacted by the construction of a tall, cylindrical grey concrete communications tower, which dwarfs the lighthouse.

The Ponta do Altar Lighthouse was first proposed by Ricardo Peyroteu on June 21, 1884. It started operations of 1 January 1893. The tower is 10 meters high and 2.7 meters wide. The original light was white and used oil as the fuel source. It combined with two smaller lights at the ends of the two moles at the entrance to Portimão harbour. In 1948, the light was changed to a red one with a range of 10 nautical miles. In 1954, the energy power was converted to acetylene gas and in 1976 the lighthouse was electrified, although gas was still used for the light until 1983. In 1992, the Ponta do Altar lighthouse was automated, using a system supplied by the Gisman company, being then controlled by the Lighthouse of Cabo de São Vicente near Sagres. In 2001, the colour of the light was changed back to white, with a range of 16 nautical miles. It uses a fifth-order Fresnel lens.

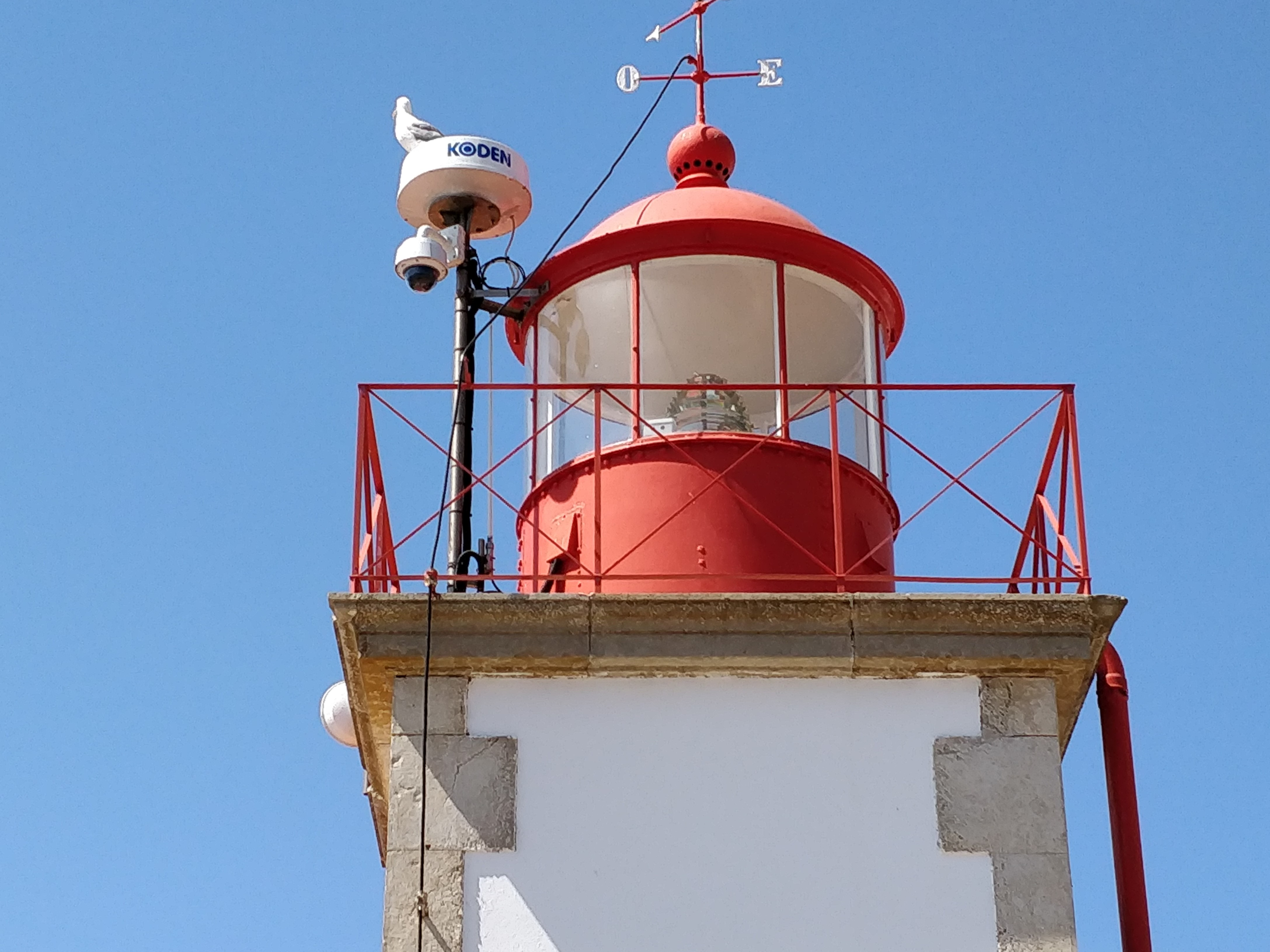
Close-up of the Light

== Visits ==
The lighthouse is accessible by road. It is not presently one of those lighthouses in Portugal that can be visited on Wednesdays. People interested in a visit should contact the lighthouse authorities.

== See also ==
- List of lighthouses in Portugal
