= Farol da Ponta de São Jorge =

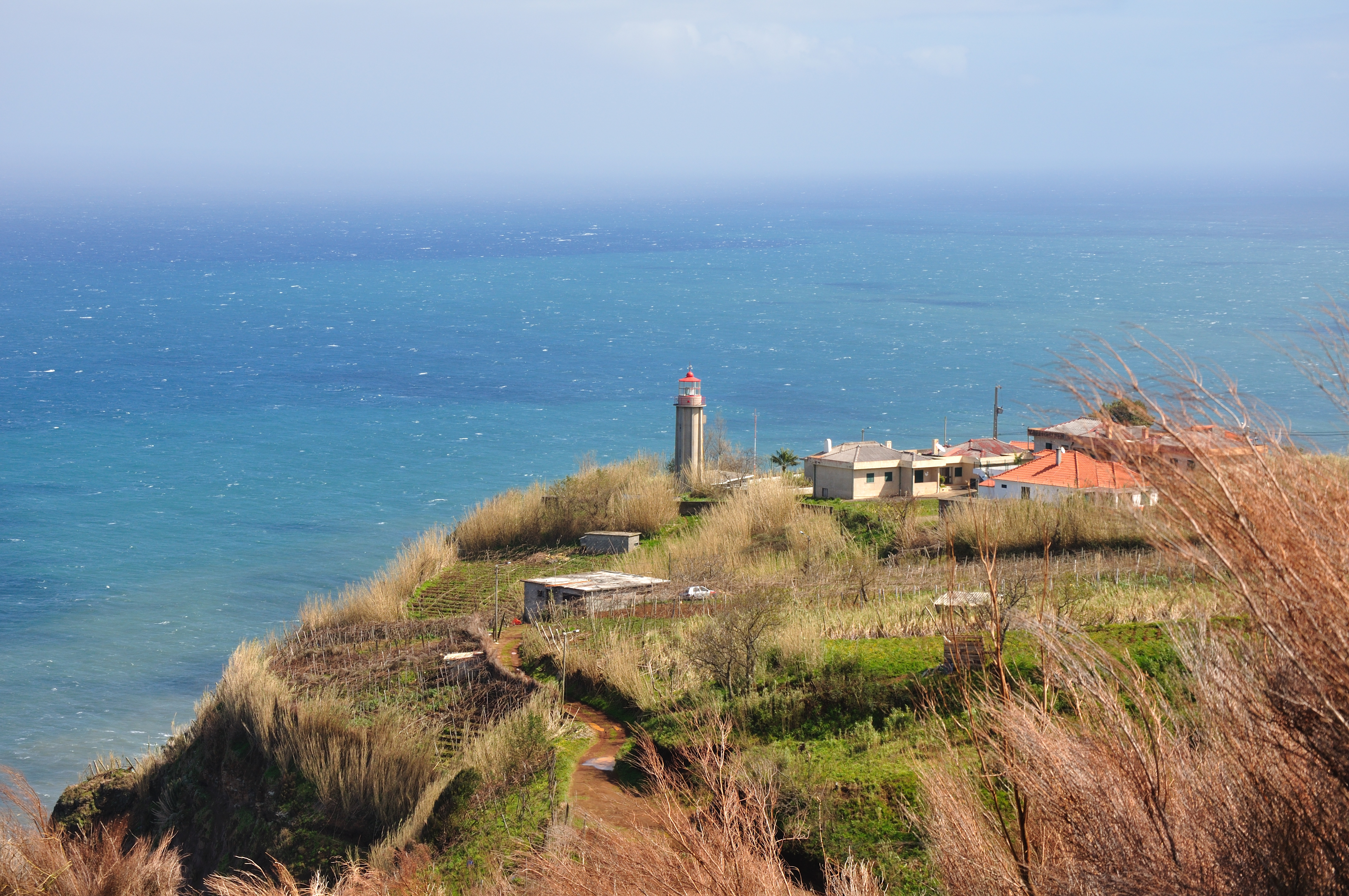
- Location: São Jorge; Santana; Madeira; Portugal
- Coordinates: 32°50′04.53″N 16°54′22.57″W

Tower
- Constructed: 1959
- Construction: concrete tower
- Height: 14 metres (46 ft)
- Shape: cylindrical tower with 8 ribs with balcony and lantern
- Markings: grey-white unpainted tower, red lantern roof and rail
- Power source: mains electricity
- Heritage: heritage without legal protection

Light
- Focal height: 271 metres (889 ft)
- Range: 15 nmi (28 km; 17 mi)
- Characteristic: Fl W 5s.

The Farol da Ponta de São Jorge is an active lighthouse located on the north coast of the island of Madeira, Portugal. The lighthouse was built in 1959 on top of a cliff and has a focal height of 271 metres.

== See also ==
- List of lighthouses in Portugal
