= Farol de Câmara de Lobos =

Câmara de Lobos Lighthouse Farol de Câmara de Lobos
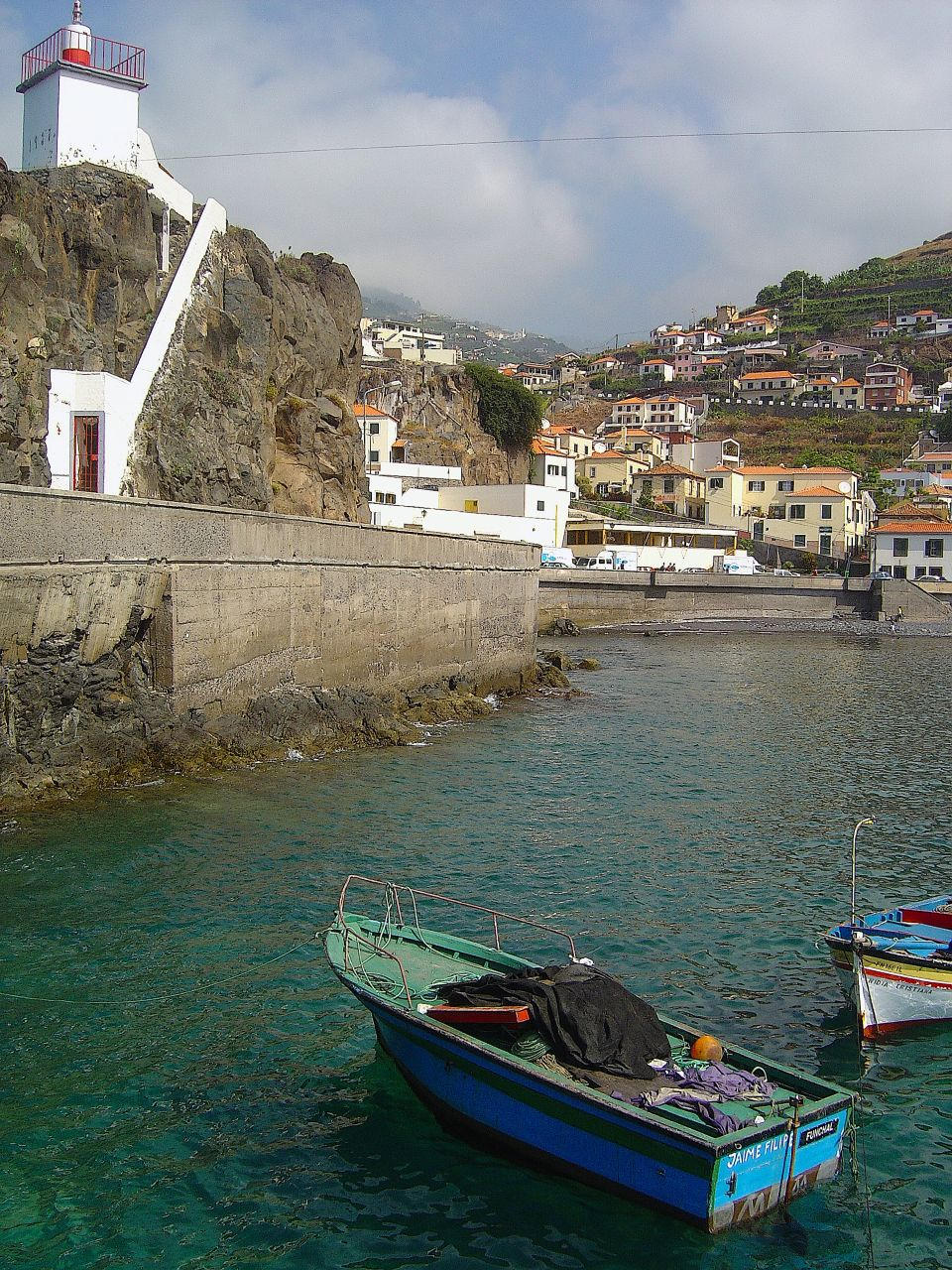
- The lighthouse in 2006
- Location: Câmara de Lobos; Madeira; Portugal
- Coordinates: 32°38′49.2″N 16°58′32.3″W

Tower
- Constructed: 1937
- Construction: concrete building
- Height: 5 metres (16 ft)
- Shape: small square equipment building with short light mast
- Markings: white building, red trim
- Power source: mains electricity

Light
- Focal height: 23 metres (75 ft)
- Range: 9 nmi (17 km; 10 mi), 13 nmi (24 km; 15 mi)
- Characteristic: Oc R 6s.

The Farol de Câmara de Lobos is a small lighthouse on the south coast of the island of Madeira, Portugal. The lighthouse was built in 1937 on top of a promontory at a focal height of 23 metres, and is located about 7 km west of the city of Funchal.

== See also ==
- List of lighthouses in Portugal
