= Azeda Lighthouse =

Lighthouse in Setúbal, Portugal

Azeda Lighthouse Farol de Azeda
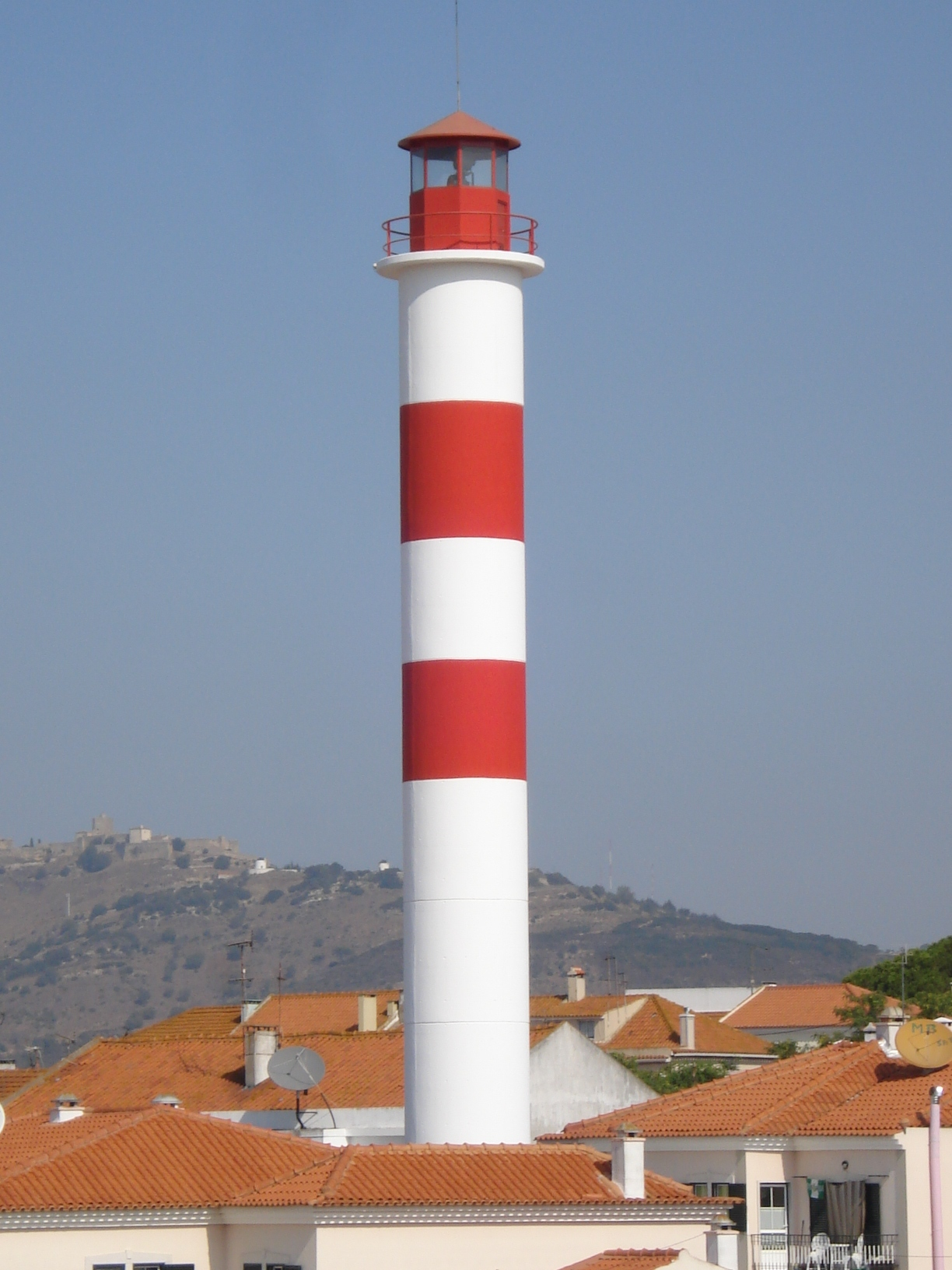
- Azeda Lighthouse
- Location: Setúbal, Setúbal District, Portugal
- Coordinates: 38°32′19″N 8°52′42″W

Tower
- Constructed: 6 June 1940
- Automated: 1985
- Height: 31 metres (102 ft)
- Heritage: heritage without legal protection

Light
- Focal height: 61 m (200 ft)
- Range: 22 nautical miles
- Characteristic: Iso Y 6s

The Azeda Lighthouse went into operation on 6 June 1940 at the Quinta da Azeda in Setúbal, in Setúbal District, Portugal. Initially the light was mounted in a hut on a hill but new housing construction made it difficult to see and in 1996 a 31-metre tall cylindrical tower was constructed. The lighthouse is situated about 3 kilometres inland. In addition to supporting the light, the tower also functions as a water tower for the town of Setúbal.

The first lighthouse, built in June 1940, had a fixed red light. It was 6.5 metres tall with an altitude of 72 metres. The dioptric lens was of the 6th order and the range was 8 nautical miles. This was quickly replaced in December of the same year by an 8th-order reflective dioptric lens that extended the range to ten nautical miles. In March 1985, the fixed light was adapted to emit flashes.

As it was becoming difficult to see the structure during the day and was even difficult to see the light at night due to new construction in the vicinity, a cylindrical tower was constructed in 1996 and opened in October. It was painted white with two red bands near the top. The base of the tower has an altitude of 61 metres and the tower is 31 metres tall. The light is a yellow Isophase light emitting 3-second flashes every six seconds, with a range of 22 nautical miles. It is technically known as the Azeda/Setúbal Entrance Range Rear Light.

== See also ==
- Directorate of Lighthouses, Portugal
- List of lighthouses in Portugal
