= Vila Real de Santo António Lighthouse =

Lighthouse in Portugal

Vila Real de Santo António Lighthouse Farol de Vila Real de Santo António
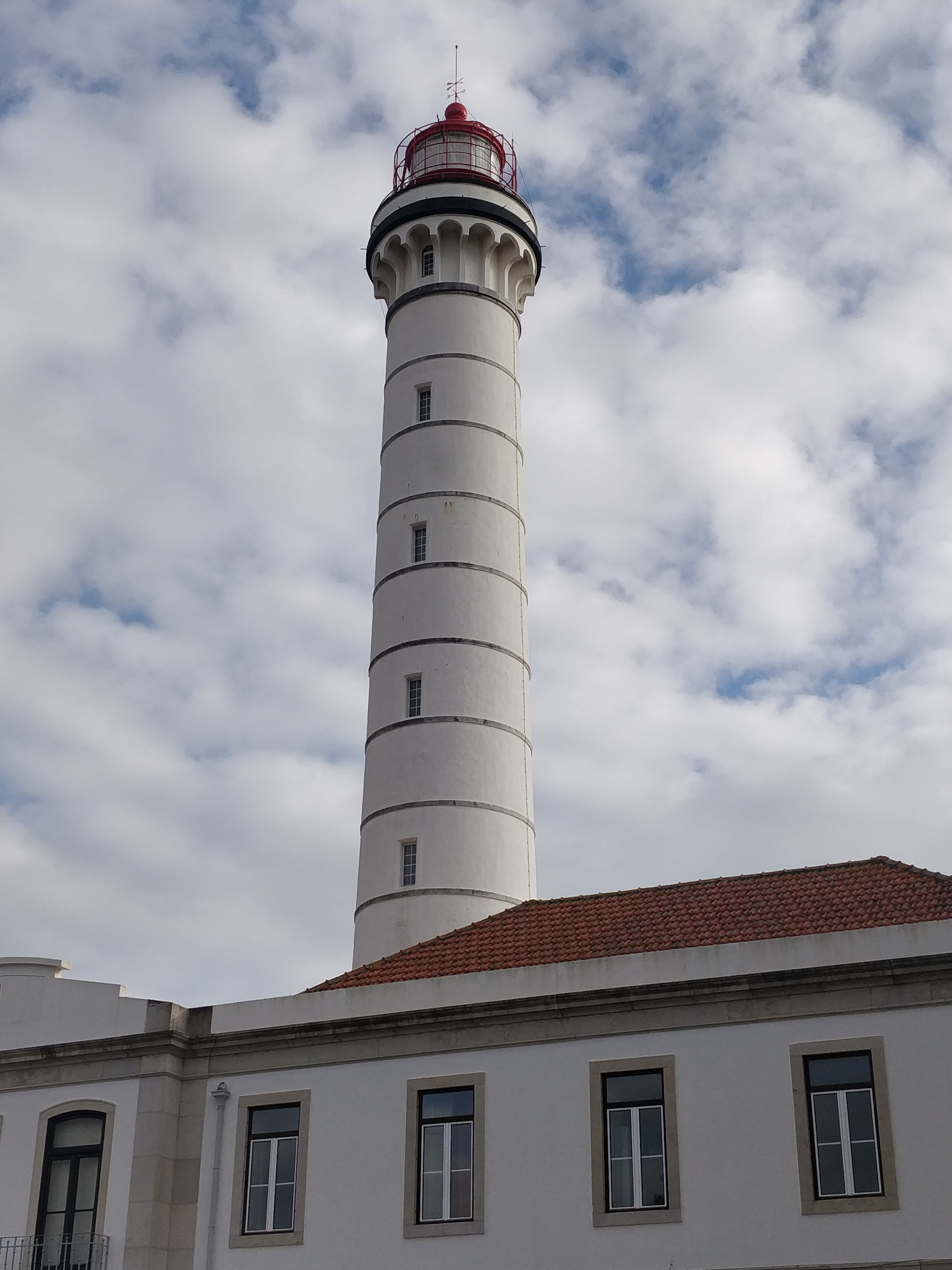
- Location: Vila Real de Santo António, Algarve, Portugal
- Coordinates: 37°11′12.6″N 7°24′59″W

Tower
- Constructed: 1923
- Construction: concrete
- Automated: 1989
- Height: 46 metres (151 ft)
- Heritage: heritage without legal protection

Light
- Focal height: 57 m (187 ft)
- Lens: Third-order Fresnel
- Range: 26 nautical miles
- Characteristic: Fl W 6,5s

The Vila Real de Santo António lighthouse is located on the right bank of the river Guadiana, in Vila Real de Santo António, in the Algarve region of Portugal.

== History ==
The lighthouse was first planned in 1884 but construction did not begin until 1916. It came into operation in January 1923, after many years of discussion regarding the best construction method, as it is built in a sandy area. It rests on reinforced concrete foundations. It replaced an earlier lighthouse, called the "Farolinho de ferro" (little iron lighthouse).

The light was originally obtained using incandescence from petroleum vapour, with a range of 33 miles It is still equipped today with a third-order Fresnel lens with a focal length of 500 mm. Operations were electrified in 1927, using generators, and the lighthouse was connected to the public grid in 1947. In the same year the clockwork system to rotate the optical device was replaced by electric motors and a 3000W lamp was installed to be replaced in 1983 by a 1000W one.

A lift, installed in 1957, provides access to the light, formerly reached by 220 steps, but there has been no lighthouse keeper since the lighthouse was automated in 1989. The top of its circular tower is 46 metres high and offers views of the coast of Andalusia in Spain and the Castle of Castro Marim. The light serves as a reference for navigators in both Portuguese and Spanish waters.

== See also ==
- List of lighthouses in Portugal
- Directorate of Lighthouses, Portugal
