= Cabo Sardão Lighthouse =

Lighthouse near Odemira, Portugal

Cabo Sardão Lighthouse Farol do Cabo Sardão
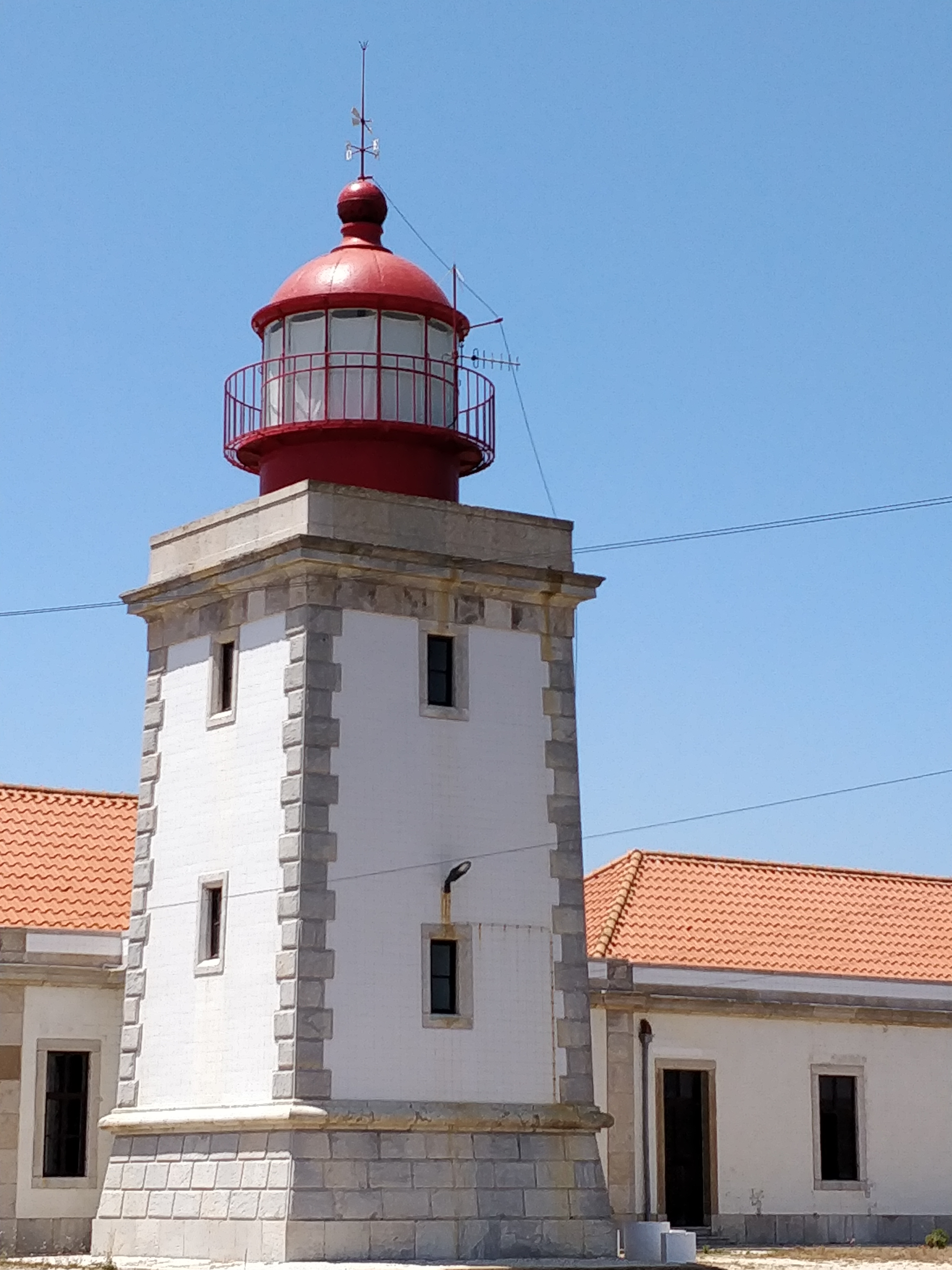
- Location: Odemira, São Teotónio, Alentejo, Portugal
- Coordinates: 37°35′55″N 8°48′58″W

Tower
- Constructed: 15 April 1915
- Construction: stone
- Automated: 1980
- Height: 17 metres (56 ft)
- Shape: quadrangular
- Heritage: heritage without legal protection

Light
- First lit: 1915
- Focal height: 68 metres (223 ft)
- Lens: Third-order Fresnel 500mm
- Light source: Electricity
- Intensity: 1000 watt
- Range: 23 nautical miles
- Characteristic: Fl(3) W 15s
- Portugal no.: 426

The Cabo Sardão Lighthouse is located at Ponta do Cavaleiro in the village of Odemira, in the parish of São Teotónio, at the westernmost point of the Alentejo region of Portugal.

The lighthouse consists of a white quadrangular masonry tower, topped by a red cylindrical lantern. There is also a lengthy annex building, together with small staff quarters. Unusually, the tower is built on the land side of the annex, whereas others of similar design in Portugal have the tower on the sea side. This has given rise to the belief that the builder may have rotated the plans by 180 degrees by accident. The tower is 17 metres (56 ft) meters high. Its construction was first proposed and approved in 1883. However, no action was taken until a Lighthouse Commission was formed in 1902 and operations only began on 15 April 1915. The lighthouse was electrified in 1950, with the installation of generators, at which time the light source was changed from petroleum gas to a 3000 watt bulb. It was connected to the public distribution network in 1984. The power of the light source was reduced and a 1000-watt bulb was installed.

While the lighthouse can today be easily reached by car and is next to a popular viewpoint, particularly for ornithologists, until the 1950s the delivery of mail had to be carried out by a courier, involving a return trip on foot of more than 20 kilometers along an almost impassable path.

== Visits ==
The lighthouse can be visited on Wednesdays. Guided tours are at 14.00, 15.00 and 16.00.

== See also ==
- List of lighthouses in Portugal
- Directorate of Lighthouses, Portugal
