= Lighthouse of Chibata =

Lighthouse in Portugal

Lighthouse of Chibata Farol da Chibata
- Location: Portugal Almada, Caparica e Trafaria
- Coordinates: 38°38′38.9″N 9°13′4.6″W

Tower
- Constructed: 1980 1893
- Construction: Reinforced concrete
- Height: 23 metres (75 ft)
- Power source: mains electricity
- Operator: Directorate for Lighthouses (Direcção de Faróis)
- Heritage: Unclassified

Light
- Range: 15 nautical miles (28 km)
- Characteristic: F R (occas)
- Portugal no.: PT-355

The Lighthouse of Chibata (Portuguese: Depósito de Água da Chibata/Farol da Chibata) is a multi-use structure water tower and lighthouse in the civil parish of Caparica e Trafaria, municipality of Almada, in the Portuguese district of Setúbal.

== History ==
The construction of the water tank and installation of the light occurred in the 20th century, probably around the 1980s.

== Architecture ==
The structure is situated in an isolated location, near the forest of Boa Viagem, on a hilltop 4 kilometres (2.5 mi) southwest of the mouth of the Tagus River. Situated around the tower is the geodesic marker of Chibata, marking an altitude of 117.47 metres (385.4 ft), various rural residences and a windmill in ruins. To the northwest is the Convent of the Capuchos and the Church of Nossa Senhora da Conceição, in addition to the lookout of Capuchos.

The structure is a 23 metres (75 ft) water tank, constructed of reinforced concrete painted light yellow, over which is a cylindrical tower of smaller diameter, also in reinforced concrete, but painted like tile or adobe. The tower consists of a circular tube and lighthouse beacon, in addition to various telecommunication antennas. The portion associated with the water tank includes a fenestral radial, with a stone parapet, that includes three levels and decorated in hammered stone with doorway. The lighthouse beacon functions occasionally, with a range of 15 nautical miles (28 km).
