= Lighthouse of Cabo Carvoeiro =

Lighthouse in Peniche, Portugal

Lighthouse of Cabo Carvoeiro Farol de Cabo Carvoeiro
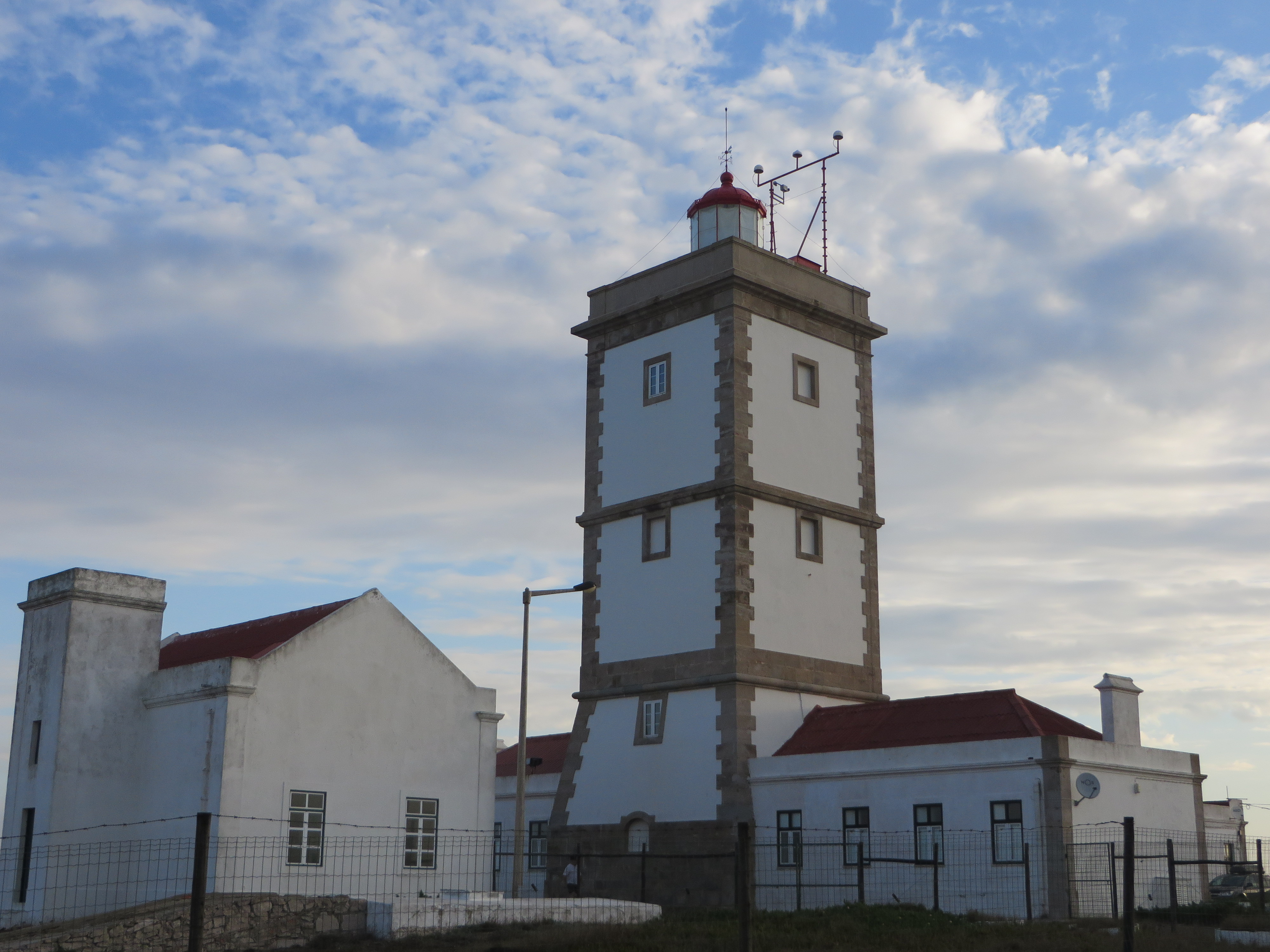
- Cabo Carvoeiro in 2015
- Location: Peniche, Peniche
- Coordinates: 39°21′38.4″N 9°24′28.1″W

Tower
- Constructed: 1893
- Construction: 1-story stone lighthouse
- Height: 27 feet (8.2 m)
- Shape: square tower
- Markings: white tower with cornerstones
- Power source: mains electricity
- Operator: Directorate for Lighthouses (Direcção de Faróis)
- Heritage: Unclassified

Light
- Focal height: 57 feet (17 m)
- Lens: 3rd order Fresnel lens
- Range: 13 nautical miles (24 km; 15 mi)
- Characteristic: Fl.R period 6s, fl. 2s, ec. 4s
- Portugal no.: PT-143

The Lighthouse of Cabo Carvoeiro (Portuguese: Farol do Cabo Carvoeiro) is an active lighthouse in the civil parish of Peniche, municipality of the same name, in the Portuguese district of Leiria.

== History ==
On 1 February 1758, the lighthouse was ordered constructed by regal charter. Cabo Carvoeiro is a prominent cape along the southern Portuguese coast, with a coastal beacon operating for four centuries from the promontory, first from the chapel of Nossa Senhora de Vitória (before it was demolished).

The first purpose-built structure was a 21 metres (69 ft) tall lighthouse that started to operate in 1790, but identified as inadequate by an 1881 commission. In 1865, the lighthouse was described in this form:

...it is found at an elevation of 55.52 metres. The light is white and fixed, produced by sixteen Argand with parabolic reflectors. The range exceeds about 9 miles. The lantern where this mechanism was installed has a 8.24 metre height and eight faces with a width of 1.67 metre...The building where the lantern is a rectangular tower, is constructed of masonry with cornerstones. Alongside the tower are lodgings for lighthouse keepers, offices and pantries e, linking theses buildings is a church in ruins (called the Church of Nossa Senhora da Vitória, over which there used to be a light, to guide navigators before the lighthouse existed). The power source was olive oil.

But, by 1886, it was completely remodelled, under the direction and project of Polycarpo Lima. This included the installation of a petrol lamp to illuminate the beacon.

In 1923 the fixture was substituted for a giant fourth-order optical lens, and operated by clockwork mechanical system, resulting in a system of four red flashes, separated in 10 seconds intervals.

The light was substituted in 1947 by gas lamp. Between 1947 and 1949, the Comissão Administrativa das Novas Instalações para a Marinha (Navy New Installations Administrative Commission), later the Direcção de Faróis (Directorate for Lighthouses) constructed the lighthouse keepers residences.

By 1952, the beacon began to operate by electricity.

The lighthouse required large modifications by 1981, in order to receive a new lens, as indicated by reports of the Comissão de Faróis e Balizas (Lighthouse and Beacons Commission). The General Plan projected had a white third-order light that could illuminate a 315º range and support a 17 miles (27 km) range. A red beacon was substituted when the lighthouse along Cabo Mondego was not changed, maintaining a fixed white lamp, then groups of two clarions. By 1988, the lighthouse was automated, with the optics removed and its place replaced by a PRB46 rotating panel, that emitted three, red flashes, with 15 second interval and 15 nautical miles (28 km) range. Its contemporary role is much less important, with the red beacon being used to guide ships on their approach to the nearby fishing port of Peniche.

== Architecture ==
Building constructed to assist maritime navigation that included a permanent residence for the lighthouse keeper, the lighthouse is situated 3 kilometres (1.9 mi) from the Peniche waterfront over a promontory.

The 27 metres (89 ft) high square tower is constructed with cornerstones and parapets painted in white, alongside a rectangular annex building. The tower with lantern and gallery rises from the base of a U-shaped one-story keeper's complex. The buildings are painted white with unpainted stone trim, while the lantern is painted red.

The illumination system consists of a rotating optical lens over a pedestal, using a white light with 15 nautical miles (28 km) range at 57 metres (187 ft) overall height. There is also a fog horn sounding one 10 second blast every 35 seconds.

== See also ==
- List of lighthouses in Portugal
