= Outão Lighthouse =

Lighthouse in Portugal

Outão Lighthouse Farol do Outão
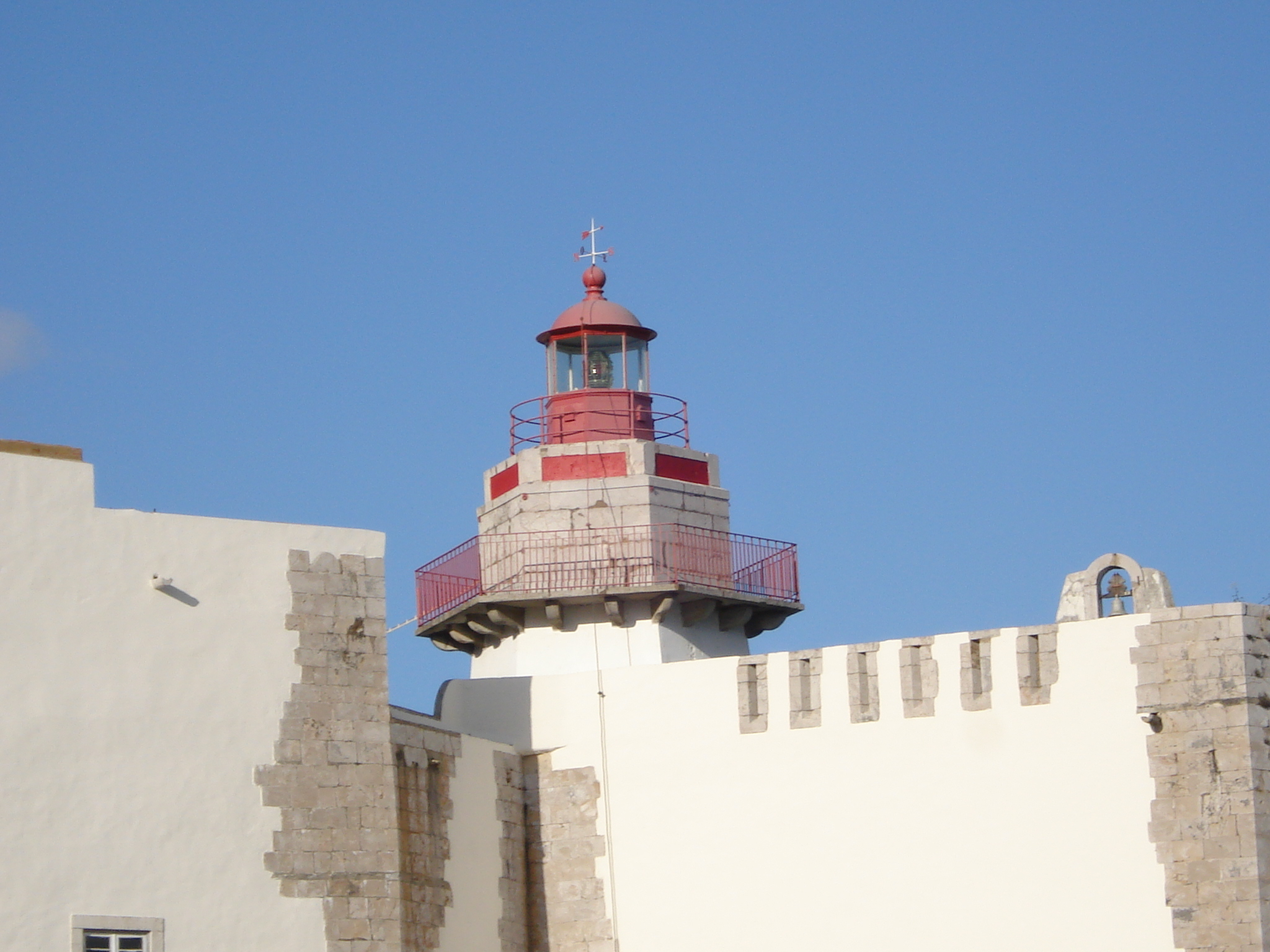
- Location: Setúbal, Setúbal District, Portugal
- Coordinates: 38°29′19″N 8°56′04″W

Tower
- Constructed: 1775
- Construction: concrete
- Automated: 1984
- Height: 11 metres (36 ft)
- Heritage: Immovable Cultural Heritage of Public Interest

Light
- Focal height: 34 m (112 ft)
- Range: 12 nautical miles
- Characteristic: Oc R 6s

The Outão Lighthouse is located in the coastal Fort of Santiago do Outão, on the right bank of the narrow estuary of the River Sado, to the west of Setúbal in Portugal.

== History ==
The lighthouse was originally installed in 1775 higher up in the Serra da Arrábida (Arrábida hills) than its present position. Little is known about the early lighting system but it is likely to have made use of Argand lamps, which were invented in 1780. In 1857 it underwent some modifications, among them the substitution of the catoptric system with the second Fresnel lens to be installed in Portugal. In 1863 it was transferred to the fort of Santiago do Outão, which since 1909 has also housed an Orthopedic hospital. The light is mounted on a hexagonal tower that has a double balcony. Part of the tower is now painted white, with the top being in stone.

From March 1916 to December 1918 the lighthouse ceased to operate due to World War I. However, in 1917 a new light and a fixed fourth-order Fresnel lens were installed, with the light source being an oil-operated lamp emitting a fixed white light. It was electrified with mains power in 1954, permitting the use of a 250W / 220V electric filament bulb. At this time it changed from using a white light to a red one. It ceased to have lighthouse keepers in 1982, being serviced by the headquarters of the Direção de Faróis (Lighthouse Directorate). In 1984 it was automated. However, in the 1990s two keepers were once again housed at the lighthouse, to be reduced to just one in 2003.

The red light shines for four seconds and is dark for two. It has a height of 11 meters, at an altitude of 34 metres, with a range of 12 nautical miles.

== See also ==
- Directorate of Lighthouses, Portugal
- List of lighthouses in Portugal
