= Farol da Ponta de São Lourenço =

Ponta de São Lourenço Lighthouse Farol de São Lourenço
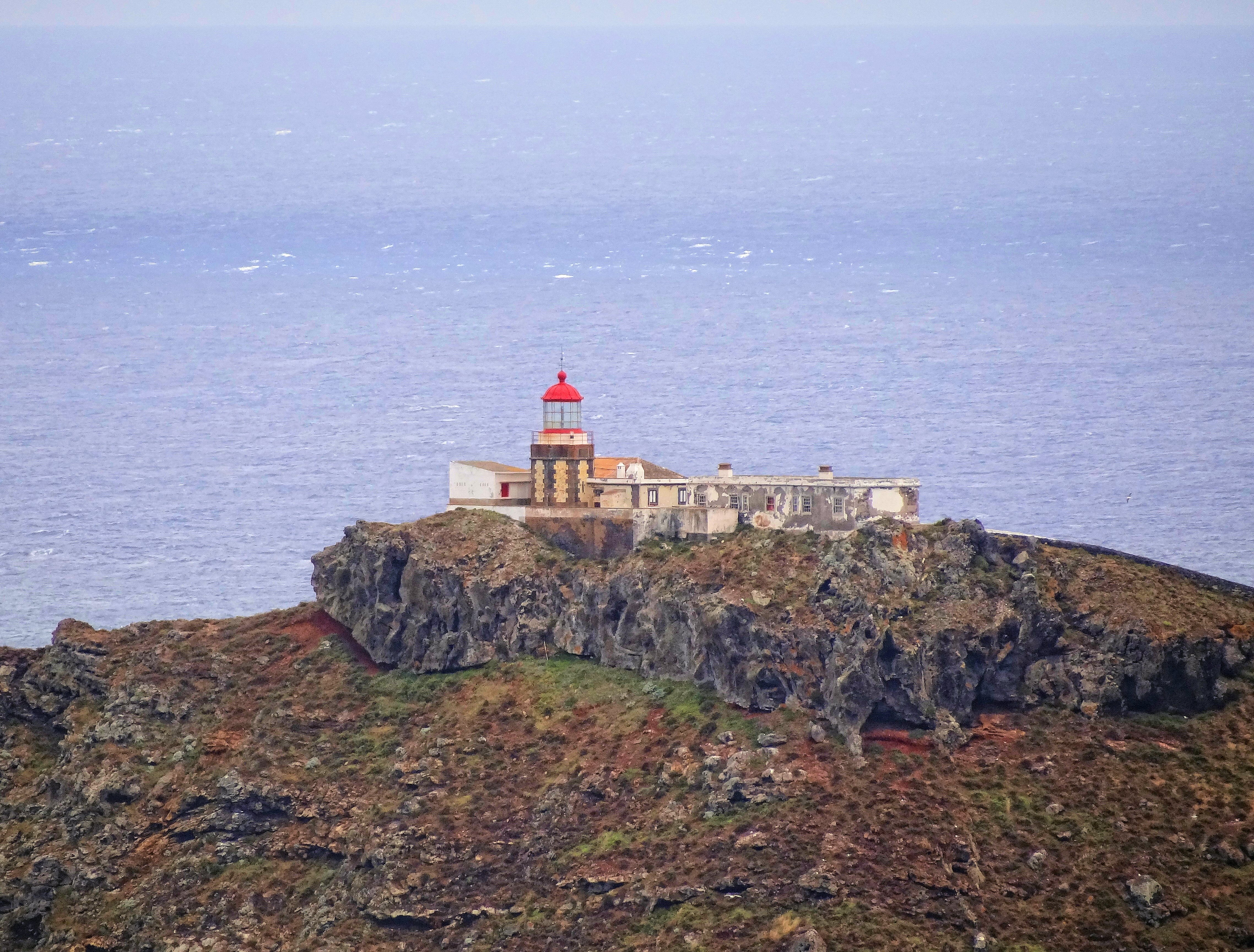
- The lighthouse seen from the north-west
- Location: São Lourenço Islet; Madeira; Portugal
- Coordinates: 32°43′47.77″N 16°39′25.14″W

Tower
- Constructed: 1870
- Construction: stone tower
- Height: 10 metres (33 ft)
- Shape: octagonal tower with balcony and lantern rising from one-story keeper's house
- Markings: unpainted dark and light stone tower, red lantern
- Power source: mains electricity
- Heritage: proposed Immovable Cultural Heritage of Municipal Interest

Light
- Focal height: 103 metres (338 ft)
- Lens: 400 mm acrylic lens
- Range: 20 nmi (37 km; 23 mi)
- Characteristic: Fl W 5s.

The Farol da Ponta de São Lourenço (Portuguese for the "lighthouse of Saint Lawrence point") is a lighthouse located on the islet of São Lourenço, marking the extreme east of Madeira Island, Portugal.

The lighthouse was built in 1870 on top of a small extinct volcano and has a focal point of 103 metres. It is the oldest lighthouse in Madeira.

== See also ==
- Video of the lighthouse
- List of lighthouses in Portugal
