= Lighthouse of Ponta do Albernaz =

Lighthouse in Portugal

Ponta do Albernaz Lighthouse Farol do Albarnaz
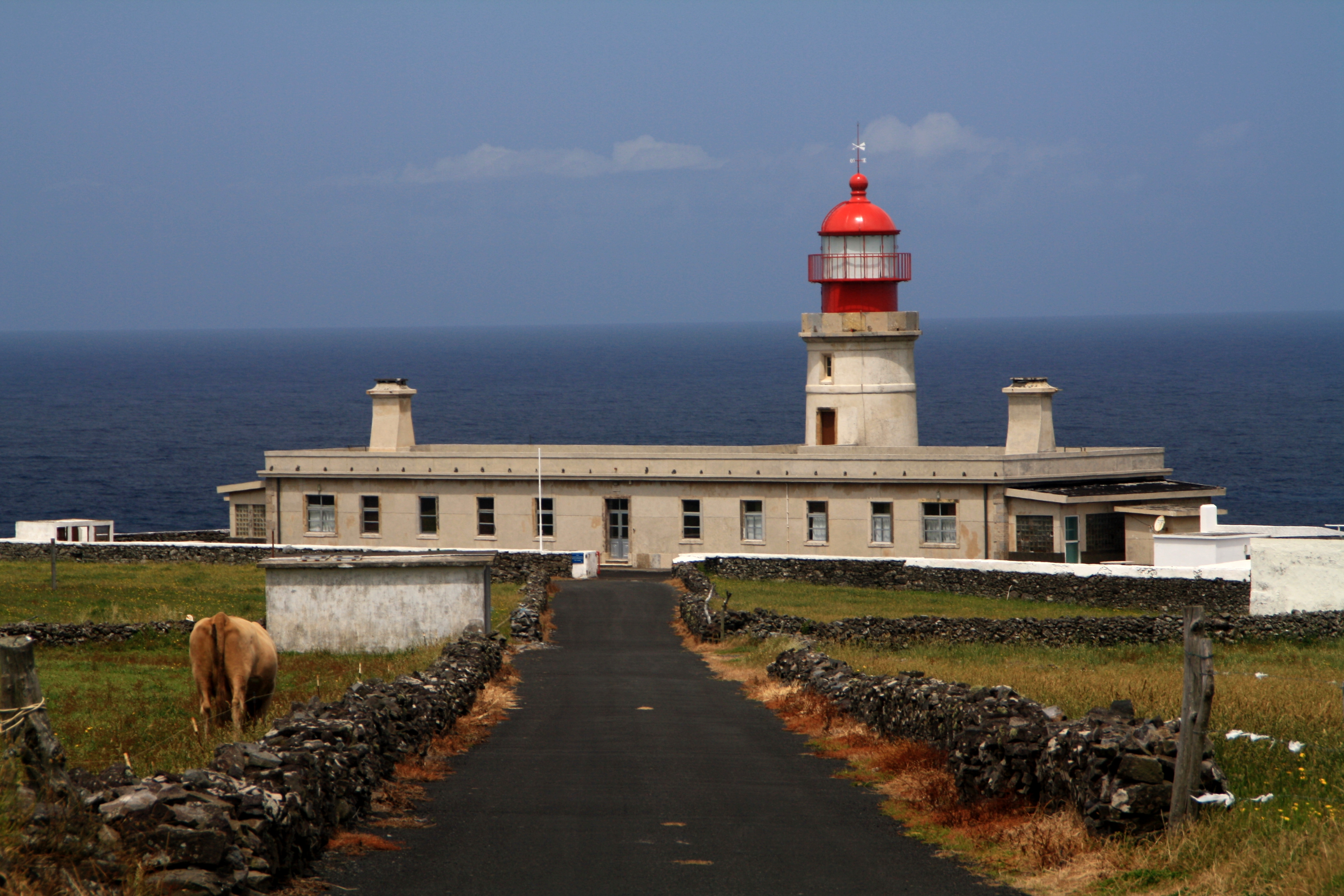
- The main lightouse and lighthouse keeper block on the edge of the cliff
- Location: Flores, Portugal
- Coordinates: 39°31′12.60″N 31°14′12.91″W

Tower
- Constructed: 1902
- Construction: stone
- Height: 15 m (49 ft)
- Heritage: heritage without legal protection

Light
- Focal height: 104 m (341 ft)
- Lens: third order Fresnel lens
- Range: 22 nmi (41 km; 25 mi)
- Characteristic: Fl W 5s

The Ponta do Albernaz Lighthouse (Portuguese: Farol da Ponta do Albernaz) is a beacon/lighthouse located along the cliffs of Ponta do Albernaz in the northern parish of Ponta Delgada on the island of Flores, in the Archipelago of the Azores, Portugal.

== History ==
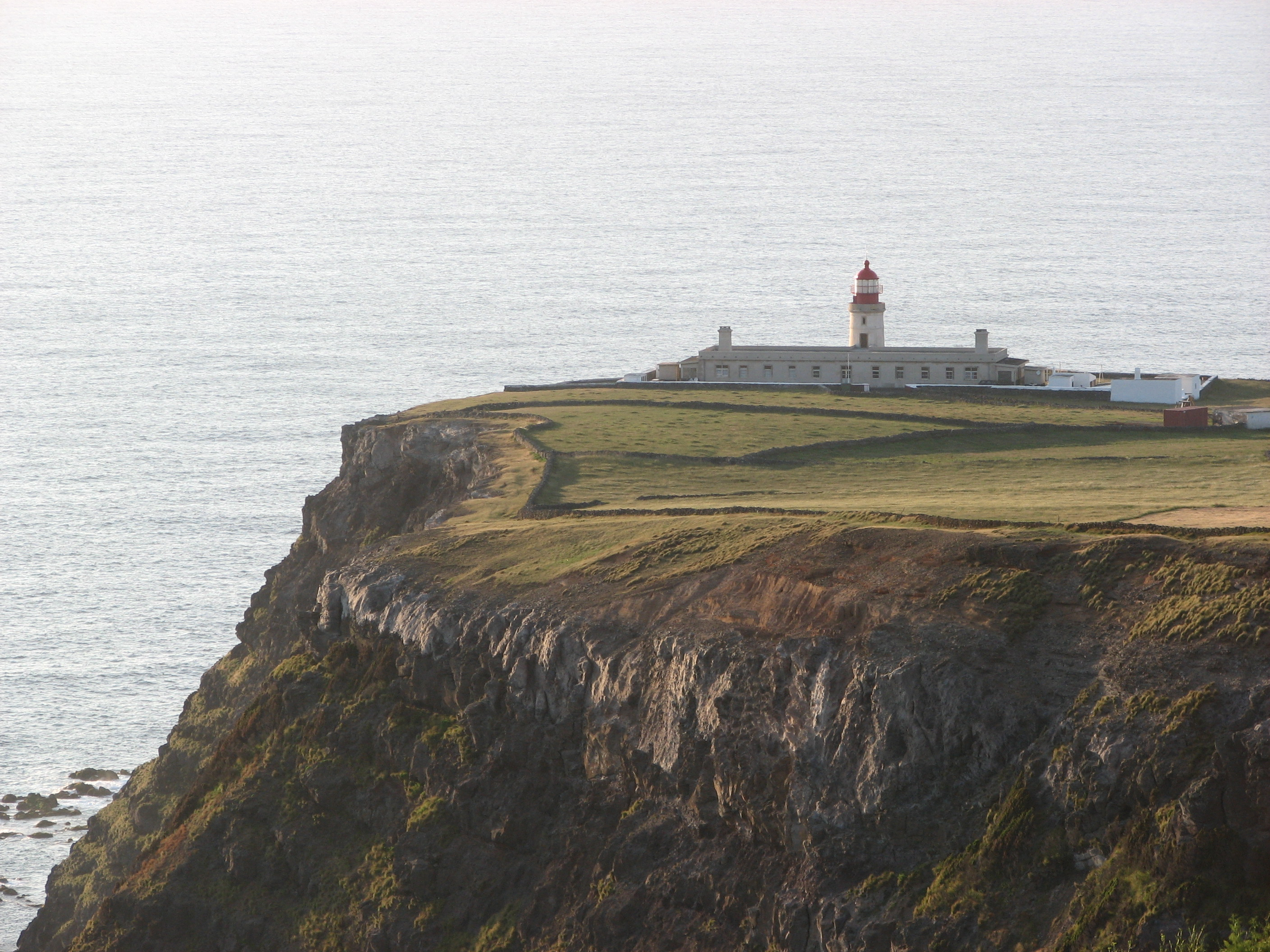
The lighthouse on the edge of Ponta do Albernaz

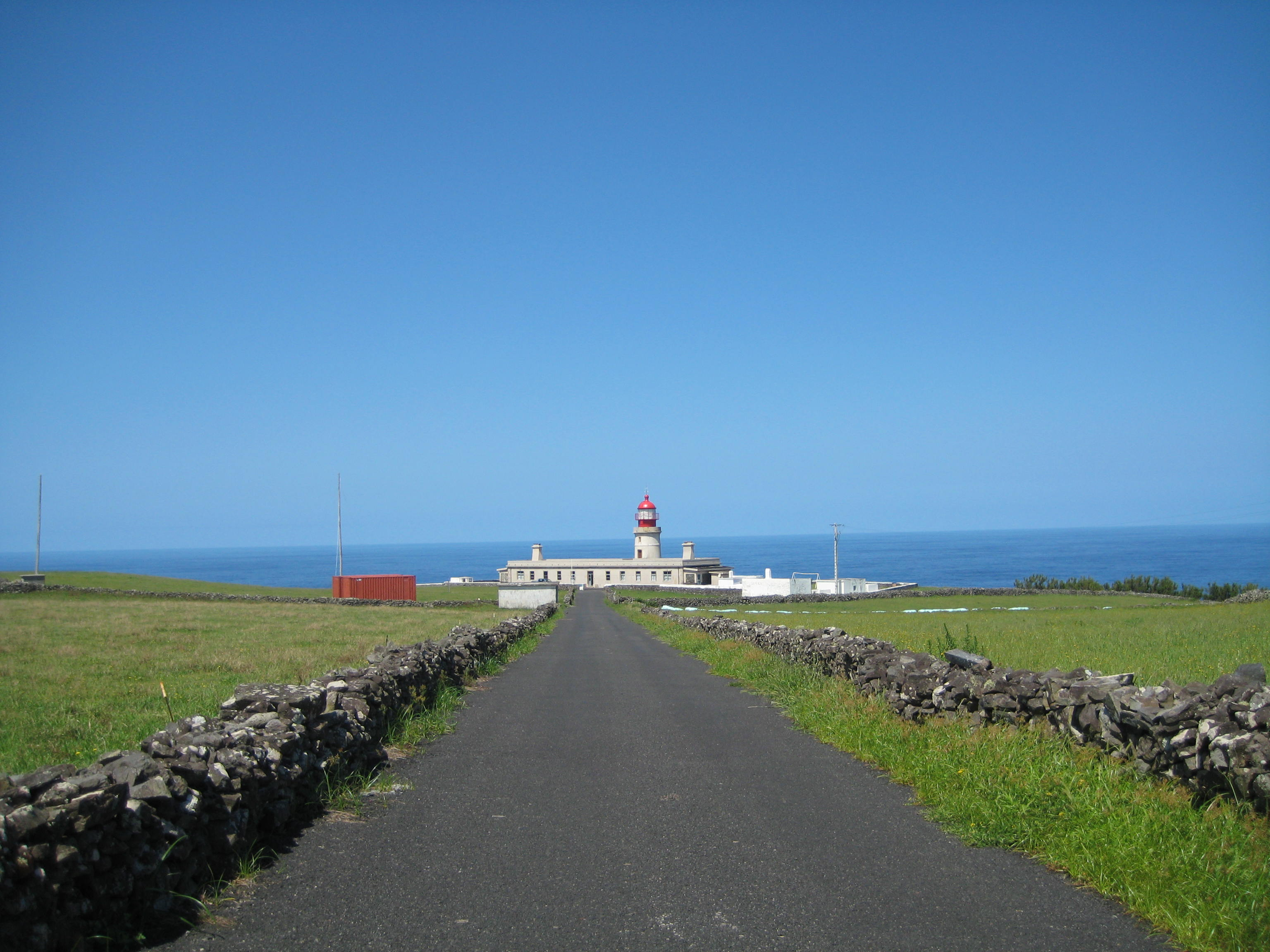
The lighthouse is located on an isolated roadway that extends to the western edge of Flores

It was erected in the northwest tip of the island, over a clifftop that allowed visibility to northern traffic around the island's waters.

Initially projected under the 1883 Plano Geral de Alumiamento e Balizagem (Illumination and Buoyage General Plan) for the settlement of Ponta Delgada, its construction was pre-empted by the 1902 commission, which intended to develop a new lighthouse based on modern technologies at the time. The plan called for the construction of a fourth-order lighthouse, and was projected by the commission for the area of Ponta do Albarnaz, 3 kilometres (1.9 mi) away from the settlement, in an elevated position along the western coast that allowed visibility in Corvo and the entire northwest coast of Flores (the promontory of Ponta do Albernaz).

This was a polemic decision, as indicated from the commission's minutes, wherein the body decided firmly:

"It was of great importance to the Commission that the illumination of that group (the islands of Flores and Corvo) that a study was made, with the most blatant attention and debated, the group of advantages that could accrue to navigation, by installing on the same Ponta do Albernaz a hyper-radiant appliance."

The 1902 commission in charge of adapting the general plan to the new realities, proposed the installation of a first-order light, with an equidistant beacon providing rotation at 5 second intervals.

A friendly contract was signed with property-owner João Lourenço in 1922, and the 5,525 square kilometres (2,133 sq mi) pastureland was expropriated (at the cost of $3.500 reis), for the construction of the lighthouse. It was a real feat of construction, since there was no access by road to the parish of Ponta Delgada, and much less to the tip of Albernaz.

The lighthouse was equipped with a third-order dioptoric beacon with a 500 millimetres (20 in) focal length, moved by clockwork turntable, serving a 28 miles (45 km) range. The lighthouse became operational on 28 January 1925, utilizing a lamp powered by diesel generator, which was later converted to incandescent light in 1938, allowing the beacon extend its range to 35 miles (56 km).

In 1938, a plane crashed in the vicinity of the lighthouse.

The site was electrified in 1956, using generating cells, and a new 3000 Watt/110 Volt lamp was installed. But, it was only in another four years before the site became linked to the telephone network. In the following decades new improvements were installed at the site, including the expansion of the lighthouse and in the upgrade of the beacon with a 1000 W, 120 Volt lamp (in 1983). In 1968, the parish priest (João de Jesus Lourenço) acquired 100 square metres (120 sq yd) for 1000$00 escudos, with the intent of expanding the number of lighthouse-keepers. in the 1980s, the lamp was replaced with metallic 1000 Watt/120 Volt halogen lamp.

Yet, by 2005, it was the unique lighthouse in the country not linked to the national electrical network.
