= Cascais e Estoril =

- Civil parish
- Location in Portugal
- Coordinates: 38.697°N 9.422°W
- Country: Portugal
- Region: Lisbon
- Metropolitan area: Lisbon
- District: Lisbon
- Municipality: Cascais

Area
  - Total: 29.16 km^{2} (11.26 sq mi)

Population (2011)
  - Total: 61,808
  - Density: 2,120/km^{2} (5,490/sq mi)
- Time zone: UTC+00:00 (WET)
  - Summer (DST): UTC+01:00 (WEST)

Found image, Found caption,

Cascais e Estoril is a civil parish in the municipality of Cascais, Portugal. It was formed in 2013 by the merger of the former parishes Cascais and Estoril. The population in 2011 was 61,808, in an area of 29.16 km².
