= Montedor Lighthouse =

Lighthouse in Portugal

Montedor Lighthouse Farol de Montedor
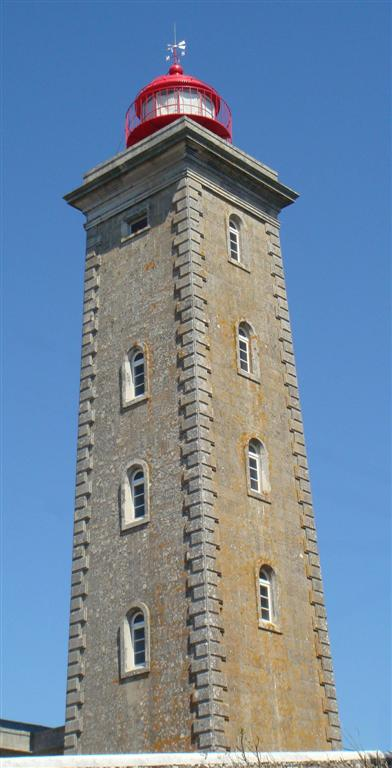
- Montedor Lighthouse
- Location: Viana do Castelo, Viana do Castelo District, Portugal
- Coordinates: 41°45′00″N 8°52′30″W

Tower
- Constructed: 1910
- Construction: stone
- Automated: 1987
- Height: 28 metres (92 ft)
- Heritage: heritage without legal protection

Light
- Focal height: 103 metres (338 ft)
- Lens: 3rd-order Fresnel 500mm
- Range: 22 nautical miles (41 km; 25 mi)
- Characteristic: Fl (2) W 9,5 s

The Montedor Lighthouse (Portuguese: Farol de Montedor) is located on the Atlantic Ocean on a promontory in the parish of Carreço in the municipality of Viana do Castelo in Portugal. It is the northernmost lighthouse in Portugal, situated 4 nautical miles (7.4 km; 4.6 mi) north of the mouth of the Lima River and 7 nautical miles (13 km; 8.1 mi) south of the mouth of the Minho River. It was opened on 20 March 1910.

== History ==
In the second half of the 18th century, the lack of lights to support navigation led to a plan to build six lighthouses in Portugal and one was first planned for this site in 1758. However, repeated postponements meant that none of these lighthouses would be constructed until much later. The Montedor Lighthouse only began to be realised after completion of the Lighthouse and Beacon Plan on the Coast of Portugal, for which Júlio Zeferino Schultz Xavier was the main author. The engineer, José Ribeiro de Almeida, was commissioned to design it in 1903, after the location had been finalised. The main work was completed in 1908, with the lighthouse being opened for testing in March 1910. This was one of eight lighthouses planned by Xavier.

A 3rd-order Fresnel lens was installed, producing groups of three white flashes every 10 seconds. It was manufactured by the French company, Barbier, Benard, et Turenne, and was transferred from the Lighthouse of Cabo de São Vicente in the Algarve. It achieved a range of 26 nautical miles (48 km; 30 mi). In 1926 the number of flashes was reduced to two, to avoid confusion with the Leça Lighthouse.

Over time, the lighthouse has undergone several improvements. In 1936, it started to use incandescence produced by oil vapour. Facilities to broadcast radio signals were installed in 1942, being deactivated in 2001 because such signals were no longer being used by navigation. In 1947 it was connected to the public electricity grid and a 3000W lamp was installed. In 1952, the compressed air horn was dismantled and an electric siren was installed. In 1983, a Halogen lamp was introduced, enabling the wattage of the lamp to be reduced to 1000W. The light has a range of 22 nautical miles (41 km; 25 mi). The lighthouse was automated in 1987 and equipped with a new sound signal.

== Structure ==
The tower is quadrangular, constructed in granite. It is 28 meters tall, giving it a focal height of 103 meters. It has a semi-circular roof, painted red, and is topped by a weather vane.

== Impact on local culture ==
An architectural and cultural symbol of Viana do Castelo, the lighthouse was the inspiration for the composition of a song entitled Farol de Montedor.
