= Cape Mondego Lighthouse =

Lighthouse in Portugal

Cape Mondego Lighthouse Farol do Cabo Mondego
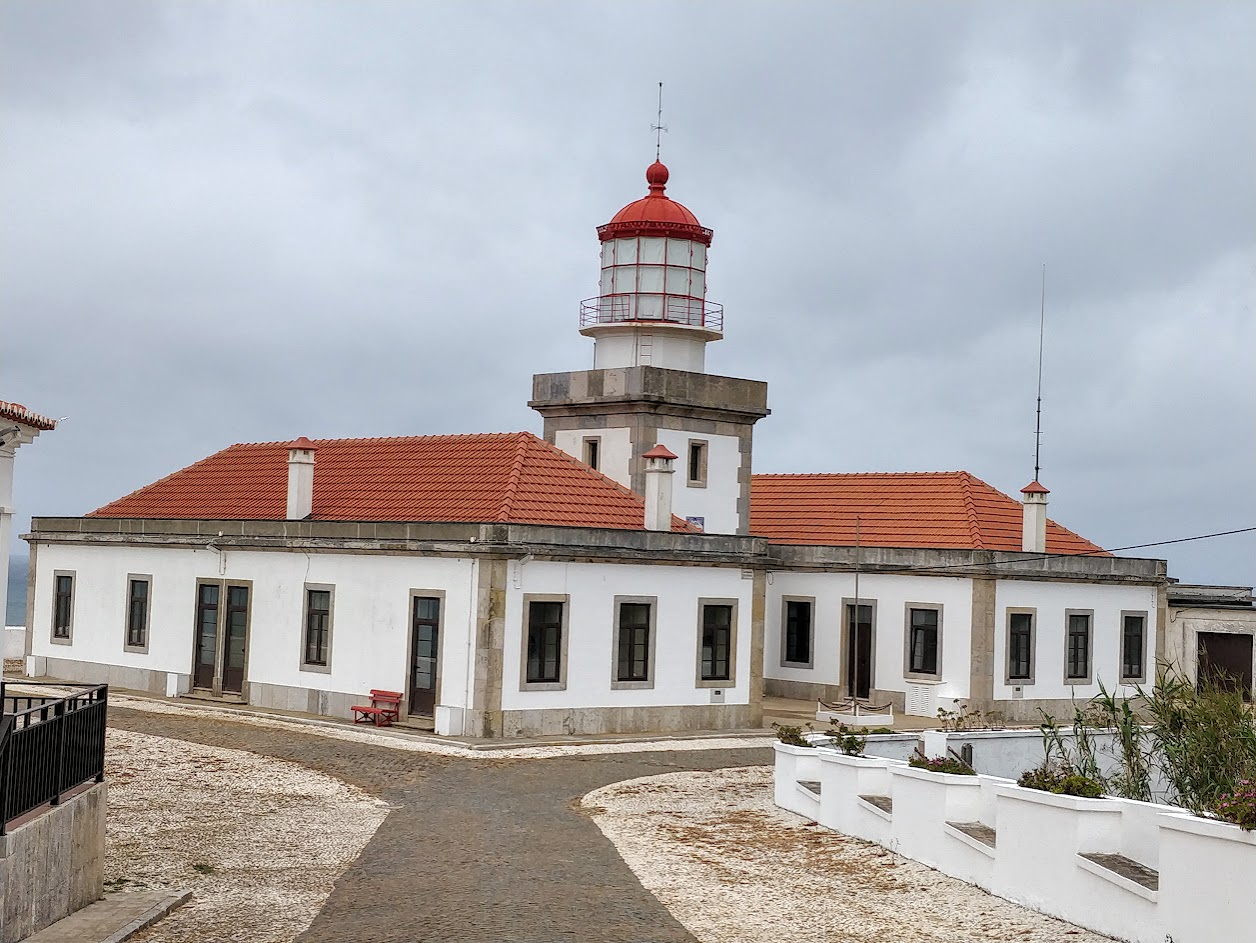
- Cape Mondego Lighthouse
- Location: Buarcos, Figueira da Foz Municipality, Portugal
- Coordinates: 40°11′28″N 8°54′19″W

Tower
- Constructed: 1922 (started 1917)
- Construction: stone
- Automated: 1988
- Height: 15 metres (49 ft)
- Heritage: Immovable Cultural Heritage of Municipal Interest

Light
- Focal height: 98 m (322 ft)
- Lens: Third-order Fresnel 500mm
- Range: 28 nautical miles
- Characteristic: Fl W 5s

The Cape Mondego Lighthouse (Portuguese: Farol do Cabo Mondego) is situated 3 nautical miles NNW of the Mondego River estuary on the Portuguese Atlantic coast, in the parish of Buarcos, in the Figueira da Foz Municipality, in the Coimbra District. It was constructed in 1922, replacing an earlier lighthouse to its south. The lighthouse has a square white masonry tower, 97 metres (318 ft) above sea level, together with annexes.

== History ==
The Cape Mondego lighthouse is in the Serra da Boa Viagem to the north of Buarcos. The first request to the government for the construction of a lighthouse in the Figueira da Foz area was made in 1836. In 1853 a hydrographic survey of the port and sand bar in the Mondego River estuary was carried out to determine the best place for the construction of the lighthouse and in 1854 a study for the construction of a lighthouse was implemented, which identified the most suitable location. A year later, proposals for the construction of the lighthouse were presented but these were not initially accepted because of the cost involved. However, in August 1857 the lighthouse started to operate and in 1858 the construction work was declared to have been completed. A 2nd order Fresnel lens was fitted, one of the first such lenses to be used in Portugal. Illumination was provided by a mechanical lamp powered by oil.

In 1902, a commission appointed to revise the distribution and quality of lighthouses in Portugal concluded that the Cabo Mondego lighthouse should be modified. In 1916, a formal proposal was drawn up to change its location, moving it further to the north. Construction of the present lighthouse began in 1917 and was completed in 1922, with the new lighthouse being opened on 20 November 1922. In 1928, illumination began to be provided by oil vapour incandescence. In 1941, a sound signal consisting of a compressed air horn was installed and in the same year electrification was introduced, using generators. The light was connected to the public electricity network in 1947. In 1982, an electric motor to drive the optical device was installed, replacing the clockwork mechanism and in 1988 the lighthouse was fully automated. The tower is 15 metres (49 ft) tall and the focal height is 97 metres (318 ft) above sea level. The light's range is 28 nautical miles.

== See also ==
- List of lighthouses in Portugal
