= Fort Santa Catarina (Figueira da Foz) =

- Forte de Santa Catarina
- Figueira da Foz, Portugal
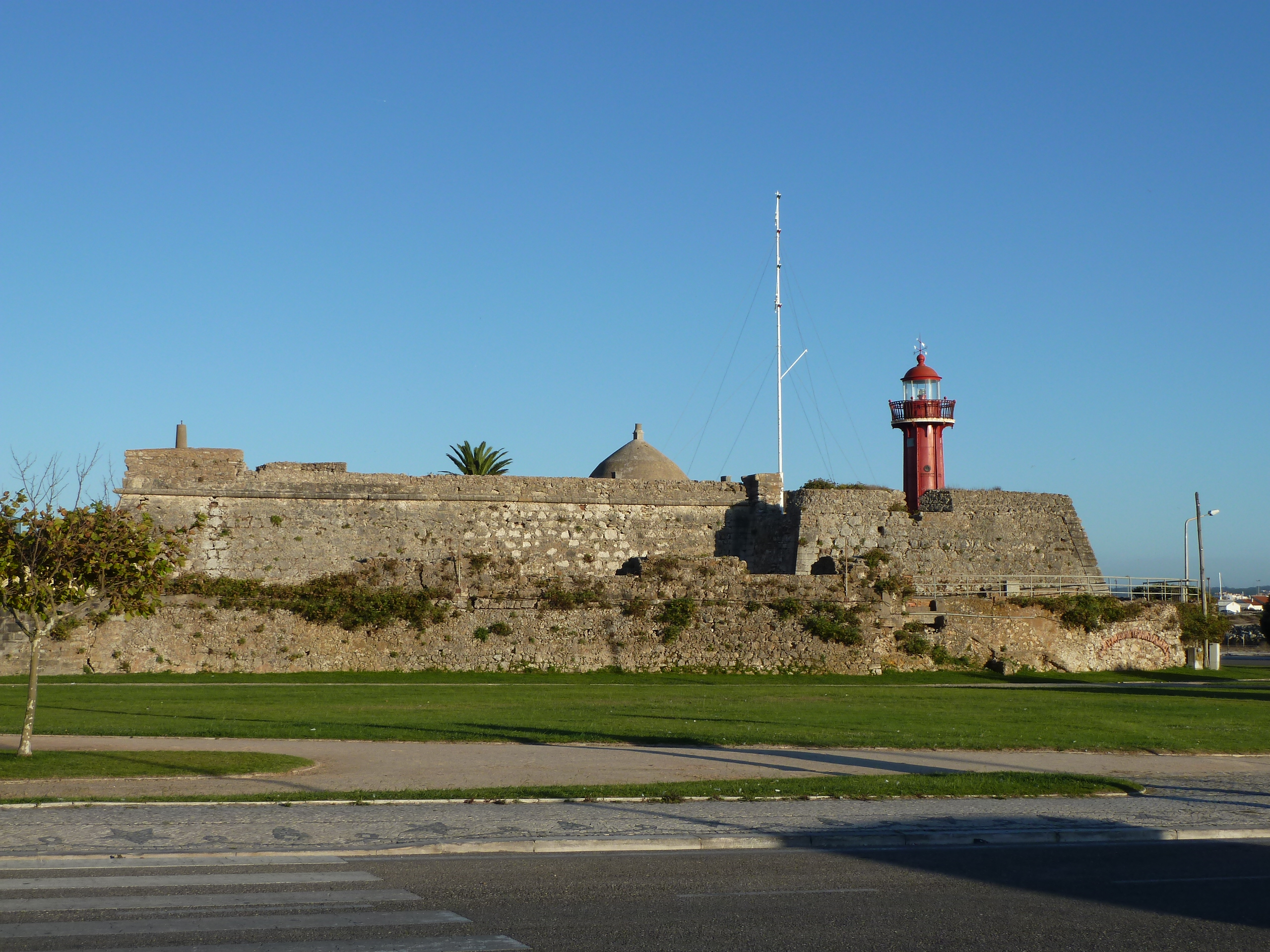
- Fort Santa Catarina

Site information
- Type: Bastion fort
- Condition: Good.

Location
- Coordinates: 40°08′53″N 8°51′59″W

Site history
- Built: Late 16th century.
- In use: 16th-19th century.

Fort Santa Catarina of Figueira da Foz is located in the parish of Buarcos, in the city and municipality of Figueira da Foz, district of Coimbra, in Portugal.

It cooperated with the Fortress of Buarcos and the Palheiros Fortlet in the defense of the port and bay of Figueira da Foz and Buarcos.

It houses the Santa Catarina Lighthouse. It is classified as a Property of Public Interest, by Decree 44.075, published on December 5, 1961.

== History ==
It is believed that the foundations of this fortification date back to the reign of King John I (1385-1433).

At the time Portugal was ruled by the Habsburg dynasty, in October 1585, some "good men" from the Coimbra city hall requested Philip I of Portugal (1580-1598) build a fort at the entrance to the mouth of the Mondego River, on the rocks known as Santa Catarina Hill. In response to this request, the construction work for the fort began some time later, with taxes of the town of Buarcos, the University of Coimbra, and the Monastery of Santa Cruz.

In 1602 the coast of Figueira da Foz was ravaged by English privateers, and this fort was looted.

In the context of the Restoration of Independence, with the reinforcement and modernization of the kingdom's strongholds having been determined by the War Council of King John IV (1640-1656), the defense of the maritime coast was not forgotten. Thus, in 1643, reinforcement works began on the Santa Catarina, when one of the fortification's walls was expanded, its artillery increased to 15 pieces of different calibers.

In a short time, however, despite the strategic importance of the defense of Mondego rivermouth, information shows that, in 1680, the fort's facilities were in ruins, and a budget was drawn up for its renovation. This ended up not happening since, the money destined to his works ended up being consumed in other expenses of the War of Restoration.

In 1808 the fort was occupied by Napoleonic troops under the command of Jean-Andoche Junot, during the Peninsular War. A few months later, a force of two dozen volunteer students from the University of Coimbra, under the command of Artillery Sergeant Bernardo António Zagalo (from Ovar) and Infantry Sergeant Inácio Caiola, at the head of 3000 people of differing military training, equipment and value, forced the French garrison of the fort to surrender on the 27th of June, taking it under arrest to Coimbra, where they had come from. The fort was then occupied by the forces of Admiral Charles Cotton who, in command of the British fleet off the Portuguese coast, was thus able to ensure the safe landing of 13,000 men under Arthur Wellesley on the coast of Lavos, on 1 August.

Throughout the 19th century the fort was mentioned in successive reports, which referred to the need for urgent repairs, until the loss of its military function.

In 1911 a part of the fort's space was ceded to the Instituto de Socorros a Náufragos. The remainder was leased to Ténis Club Figueirense a few years later.

== Lighthouse ==
A lighthouse was installed in the fort in 1888 and was deactivated in 1969. It is a cylindrical cast-iron tower, approximately 10 meters high, with a lantern and gallery, painted red.

== Features ==
The fort has a triangular, organic plant, adapted to the irregular terrain on which it stands. It was criticized for presenting a very sharp angle on the faces of one of the bulwarks, which could compromise the defence. The rest have the shape of a dovetail. In the square of arms the barracks and the Chapel of Santa Catarina were built, the latter being an oratory with a square layout and Mannerist typology, built around 1598, with an image of the patron saint dating from the 18th century.
