= Caparica e Trafaria =

- Civil parish
- Location in Portugal
- Coordinates: 38.663°N 9.215°W
- Country: Portugal
- Region: Lisbon
- Metropolitan area: Lisbon
- District: Setúbal
- Municipality: Almada

Area
  - Total: 16.75 km^{2} (6.47 sq mi)

Population (2011)
  - Total: 26,150
  - Density: 1,600/km^{2} (4,000/sq mi)
- Time zone: UTC+00:00 (WET)
  - Summer (DST): UTC+01:00 (WEST)

Caparica e Trafaria is a civil parish in the municipality of Almada, Portugal. It was formed in 2013 by the merger of the former parishes Caparica and Trafaria. The population in 2011 was 26,150, in an area of 16.75 km^{2}.
