= Lighthouse of Carapacho =

Lighthouse of Carapacho Farol Ponta do Carapacho
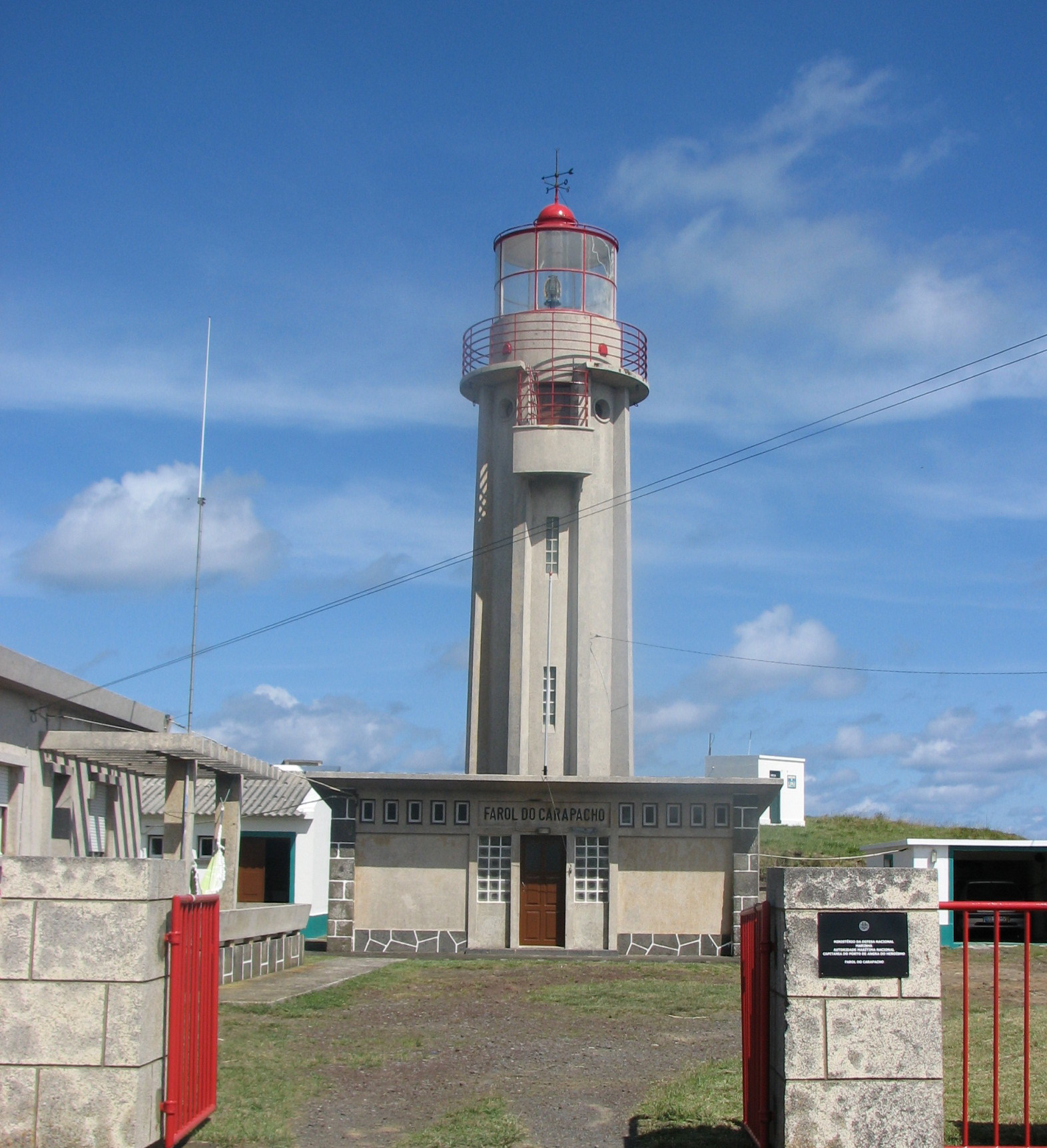
- The Nationalist-style tower of Carapacho and utility building, alongside the lighthouse-keepers' house
- Location: Santa Cruz da Graciosa; Graciosa Island; Azores; Portugal
- Coordinates: 39°00′51.4″N 27°57′18.5″W

Tower
- Constructed: 1956
- Construction: concrete tower
- Automated: 1978
- Height: 14 metres (46 ft)
- Shape: cylindrical tower with eight ribs rising from a one-storey keeper's house with balcony and lantern
- Markings: unpainted tower, red lantern dome and trim
- Power source: mains electricity
- Heritage: heritage without legal protection

Light
- Focal height: 191 metres (627 ft)
- Lens: Fourth-order light with three clarions (original), crystal optic with a six-order light with three clarion, rotational beacon (current)
- Intensity: 50 Watt/12 Volt halogen light
- Range: 20 nautical miles (37 km)
- Characteristic: Fl (2) W 10s.
- Portugal no.: PT-792

The Lighthouse of Carapacho (Portuguese: Farol do Carapacho/Ponta da Restinga) is a beacon/lighthouse located along the cliffs of Ponta da Restinga, near the hamlet of Carapacho, civil parish of Luz on the island of Graciosa, the Portuguese archipelago of the Azores.

== History ==
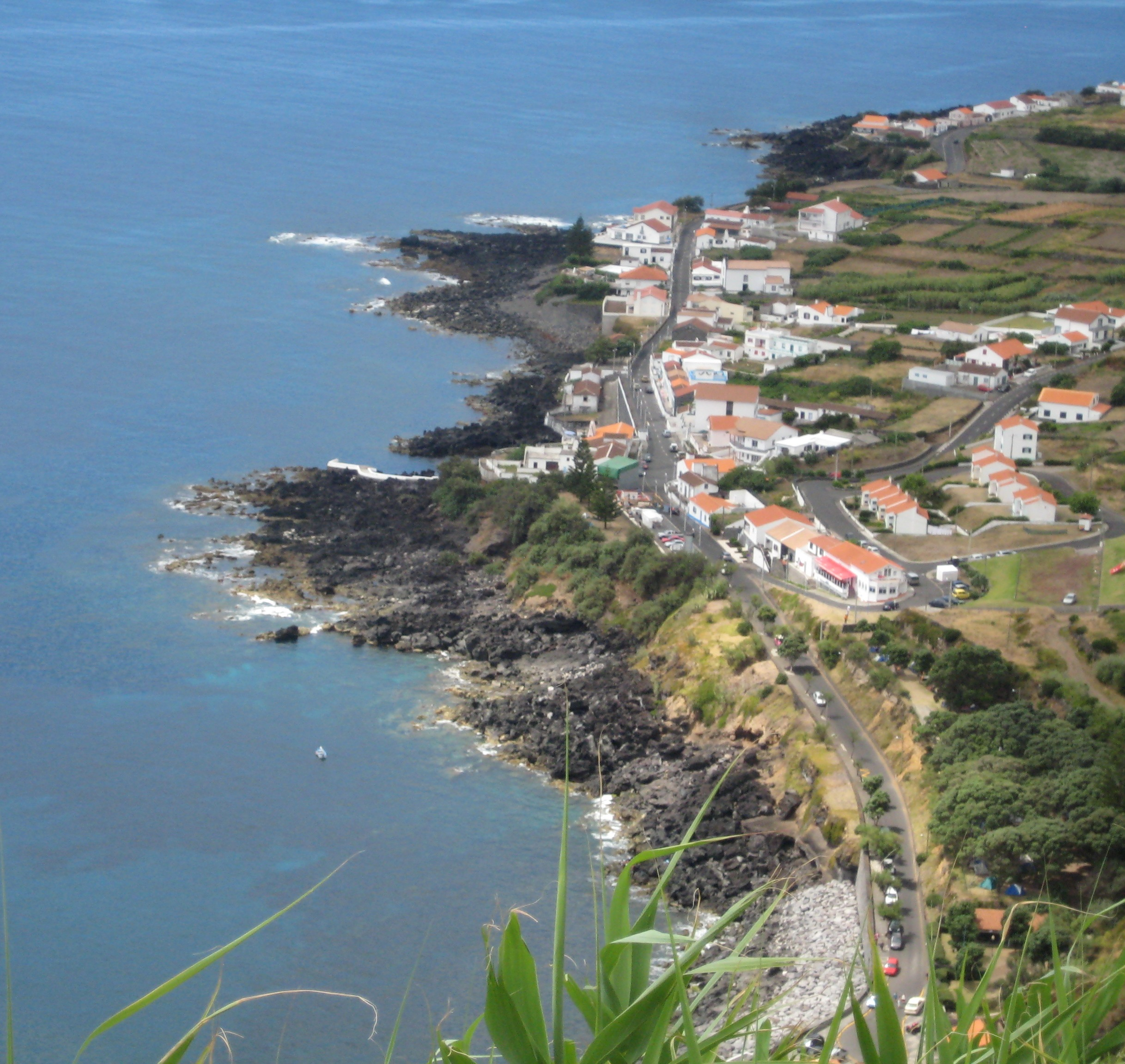
A view of the village of Carapacho from the promontory of Restinga

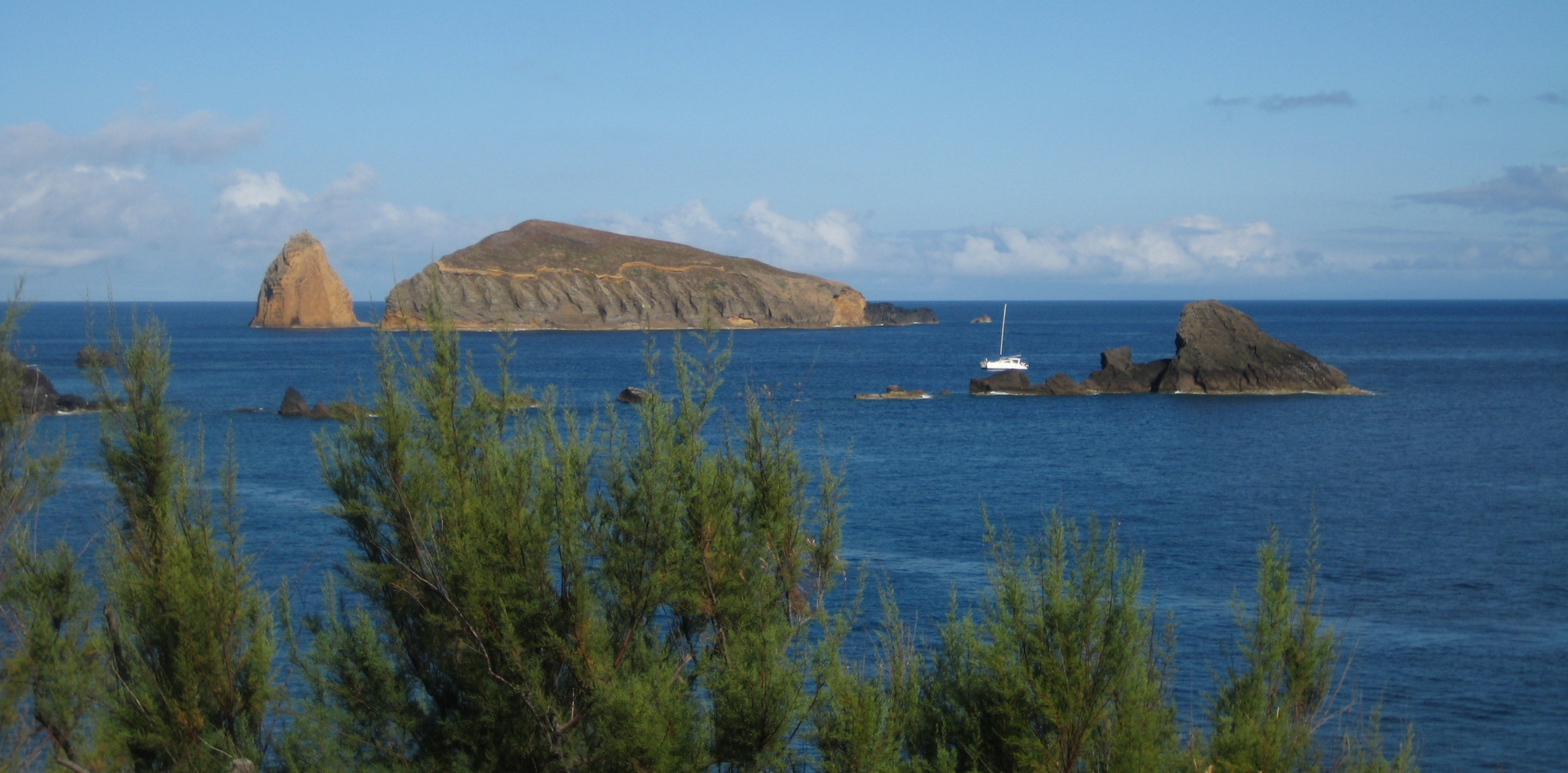
A view of the islets of Restinga off the coast

The 1883 Plano Geral de Alumiamento (Illumination General Plan), proposed the construction of a fourth-order lighthouse, that would flash each minute and have a 19 nautical miles (35 km) range.

On 11 November 1902, the Comissão dos Faróis e Balizas (Commission on Lighthouses and Beacons) proposed alterations to the General Plan approved in 1883, in which the lighthouse became a fifth-order structure, using a three-flash 10-second variable range beacon, with a range of use between 10–94 nautical miles (19–174 km) for clear, medium and tempestuous weather.

The lighthouse began to function on 26 May 1956, equipped with diotropic fifth-order optics, with a focal distance of 187.5 millimetres (7.38 in), moved by a clockwork mechanism. This first beacon used an incandescent red acetylene light, in two groups with a 19 nautical miles (35 km) range.

By 1961, the light became a white beacon, improving its range to 20 nautical miles (37 km)

A solar valve system was installed in 1978, that allowed the light to become active or inactive based on the atmospheric conditions.

It was only in 1987 that the lighthouse joined the electrical network on the island. At the same time the optics were substituted by a sixth-order lamp with a focal distance of 150 millimetres (5.9 in) and the lamp was upgraded to a 50 Watt/12 Volt halogen light, supported by battery and secured by the exterior network.

== Architecture ==
It is situated on the southeastern tip of the island of Graciosa, on a promontory a 1 kilometre (0.62 mi) from the village of Carapacho.

It is comparable to similar structures on the island of São Miguel, specifically the lighthouses at Ponta Garça and Ponta do Cintrão. The lighthouse consists of a round concrete tower, constructed with ribs, rising from a one-story building.

Accessible by road, the site is open to the public with access to the interior on Wednesday afternoons.

== See also ==
- List of lighthouses in Portugal
