= Hermitage of Nossa Senhora da Ajuda (Santa Cruz da Graciosa) =

- Ermida de Nossa Senhora da Ajuda
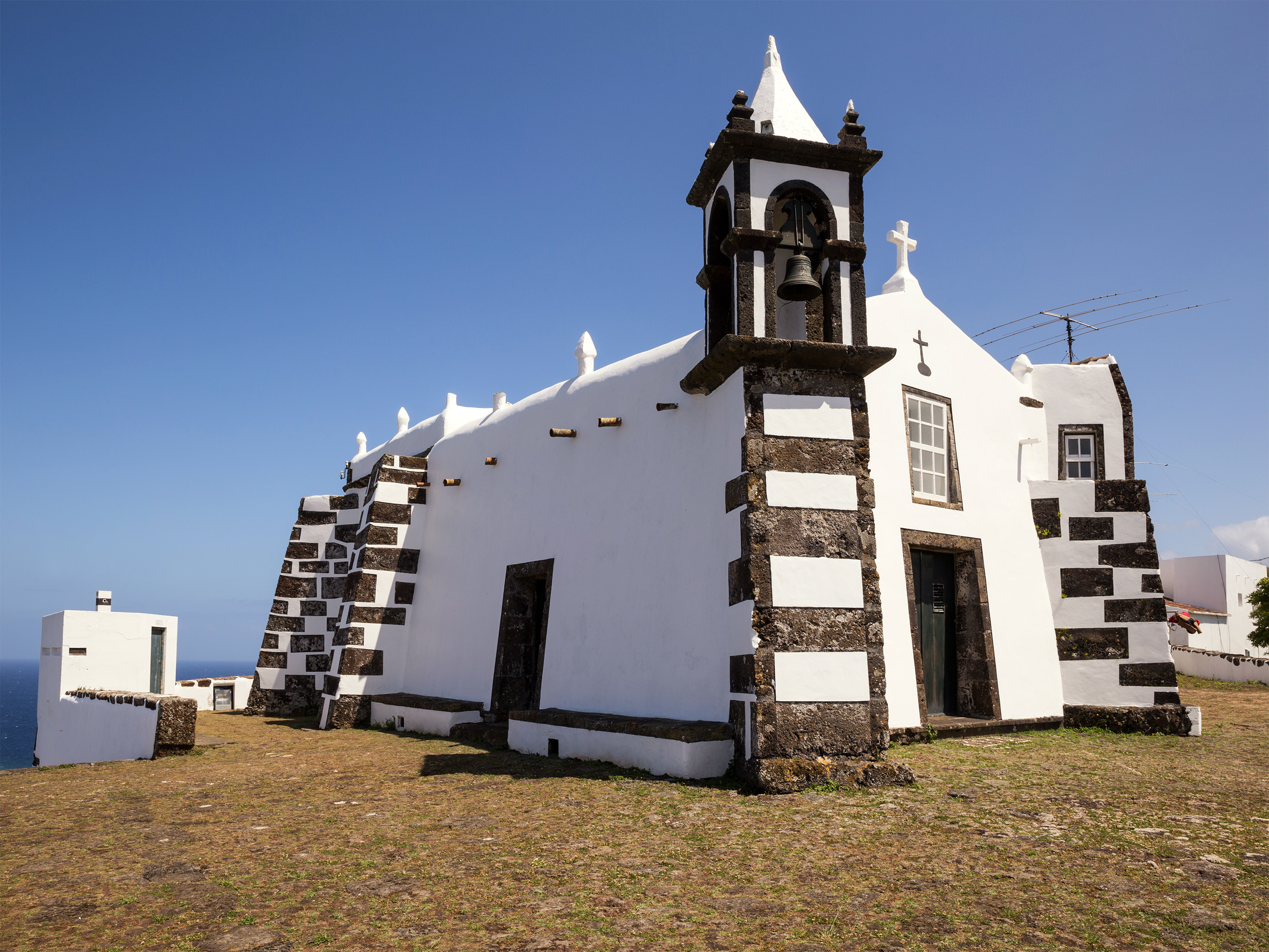
- The front facade of the hermitage of Nossa Senhora da Ajuda on the summit of the mount of similar name, showing its iconic belfry

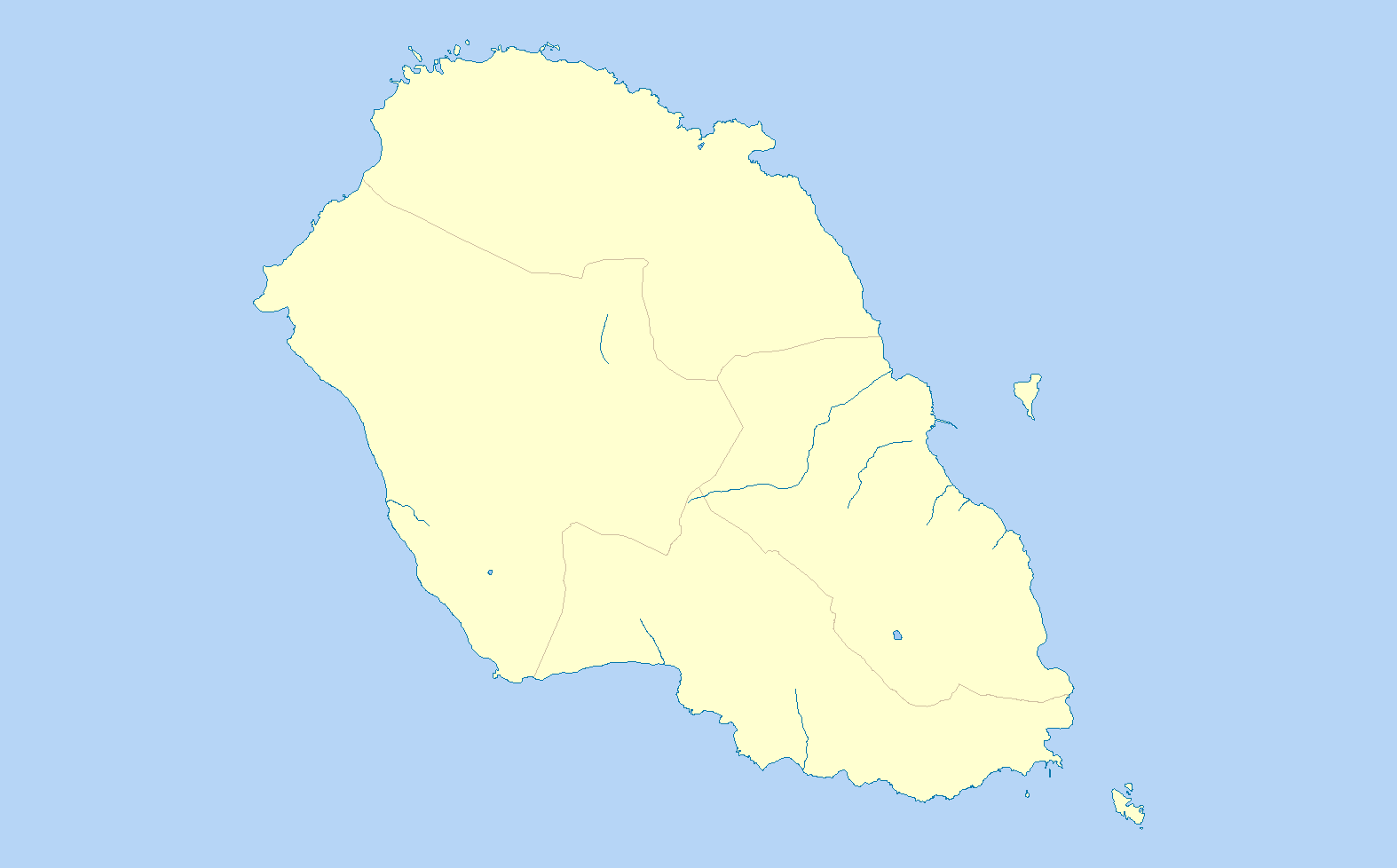
- Location of the hermitage in the municipality of Santa Cruz da Graciosa

General information
- Type: Hermitage
- Architectural style: Gothic
- Location: Santa Cruz, Santa Cruz da Graciosa, Portugal
- Coordinates: 39°4′45.89″N 28°0′6.58″W
- Opened: 16th century
- Owner: Portuguese Republic

Technical details
- Material: Brick

The Hermitage of Nossa Senhora da Ajuda (Portuguese: Ermida de Nossa Senhora da Ajuda) is a Portuguese hermitage located on top of Monte da Senhora da Ajuda in the civil parish of Santa Cruz, in the municipality, island of Graciosa, in the archipelago of the Azores.

== History ==
The hermitage was the first building to be erected on the summit, and was associated with the legend of Our Lady of Help. It is unclear what form the original structure took; historians believe that its original form was different than the actual, owing to various restoration attempts throughout the centuries associated with the seismic history of the region.

The building was likely constructed in the 16th century, and the first expansion took place in the 18th century. Sometime in 1751, two azulejo panels were placed in the interior.

On 22 December 1828, the parish council ordered the placement of a tombstone in the chapel, as a sign of gratitude for the donations made by Manuel Simas and his wife D. Isabel Maria da Silveira Simas (who had restored the chapel and reconstructed the churchyard and roadway to the hermitage).

Bishop of Angra, D. Francisco Maria de Sousa do Prado de Lacerda, visited the site on 2 October 1890; to mark the occasion, commander Manuel Simas and the vicar of Santa Cruz, Teodoro Martins Pamplona, ordered the placement of a new marker for the occasion.

In 1915, a lane of rounded stone was constructed, leading to the doorway of the main chapel.

== Architecture ==
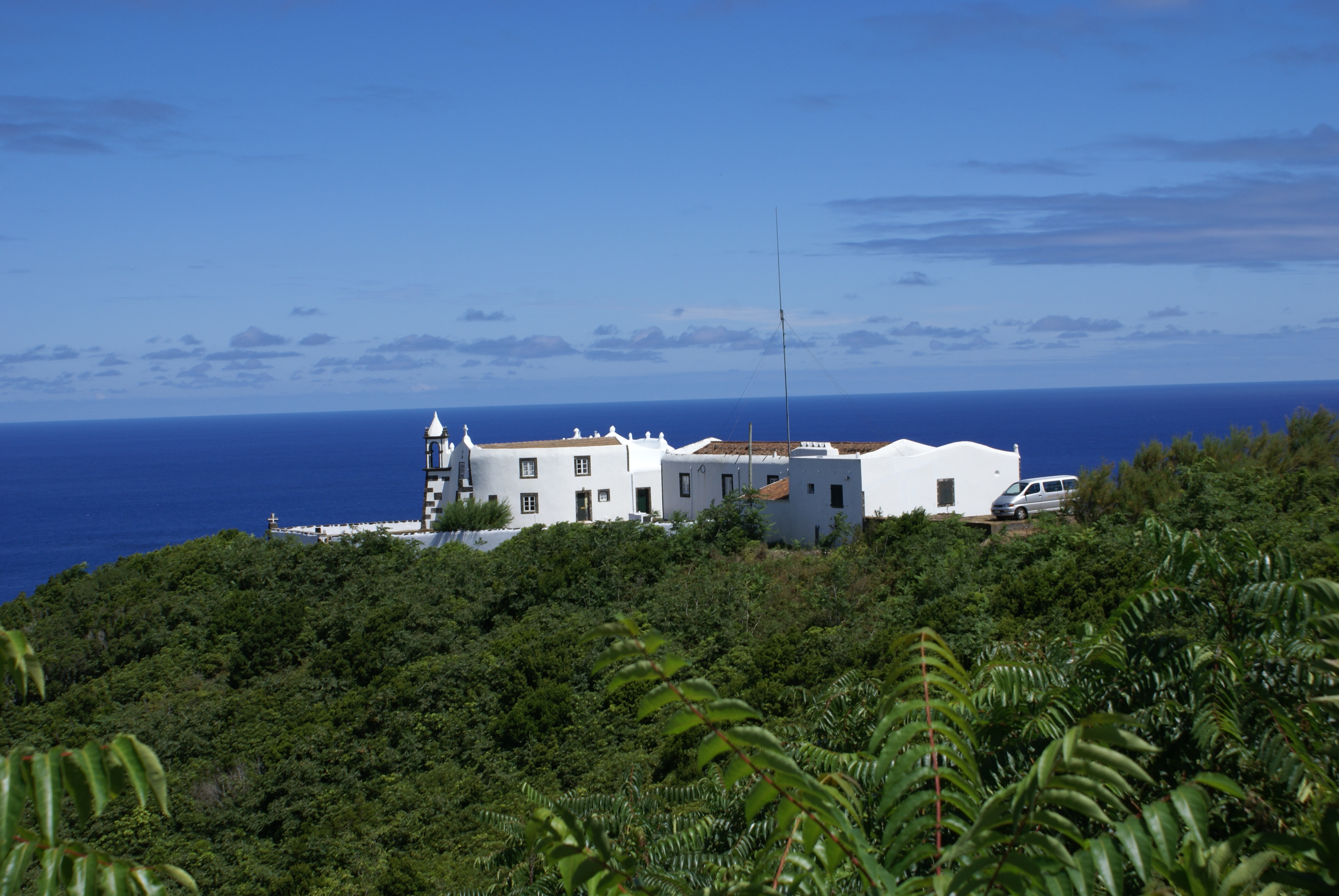
An overview of the hermitage's position at the top of Monte da Senhora da Ajuda, overlooking the regional centre of Santa Cruz

The hermitage is located on the isolated summit of Monte da Senhora da Ajuda, approximately 280 metres (920 ft) above sea level, on the summit of a small 129 metres (423 ft) volcanic cone and almost perfectly-round crater. In fact, the hermitage is part of a group of hermitages and chapels surrounded by short walls, located on the Monte da Ajuda, with a privileged position over the town of Santa Cruz and island. Around the crater rim are chapels dedicated to São João (probably from the 16th century) and São Salvador (from the 18th century), while a bullfighting arena is located in the centre of the crater. A roadway and wall continue to exist from the town to the Mount, while a small wall semi-encircles the courtyard (surmounted by occasional basalt crosses). The posterior left corner of the courtyard is occupied, alongside the chapel, a whalewatching lookout, dated to 1959 (inscribed over the door).

The hermitage is dedicated to the Marian devotion and is an example of the "fortified" religious architecture of the 16th century. The lateral annex is occupied by a Casa dos Romeiros, for pilgrims that annually bisected the town roads chanting, during Lent.

Over the main gate/doorway of the Hermitage is a plaque dated as 1915, which references the passage at the entranceway, and not any specific work done at the hermitage. The three hermitages are single-nave, with chapel accessible from a triumphal arch. The small sacristies are directly connected to the chapel with baptismal fonts, with the one in the Hermitage of Nossa Senhora da Ajuda being more ornamental.

While the three chapels/hermtiages have varying styles, the Hermitage of Nossa Senhora da Ajuda, still maintains many of the original Gothic-Manueline characteristics. The buildings are constructed of plastered masonry and painted white, with the corners, cornices, frames and decorative elements in exposed basalt. The building includes a small belfry, with four rounded openings.

== See also ==
- Diocese of Angra
