= Lighthouse of Ponta da Barca =

Ponta da Barca Lighthouse Farol da Ponta da Barca
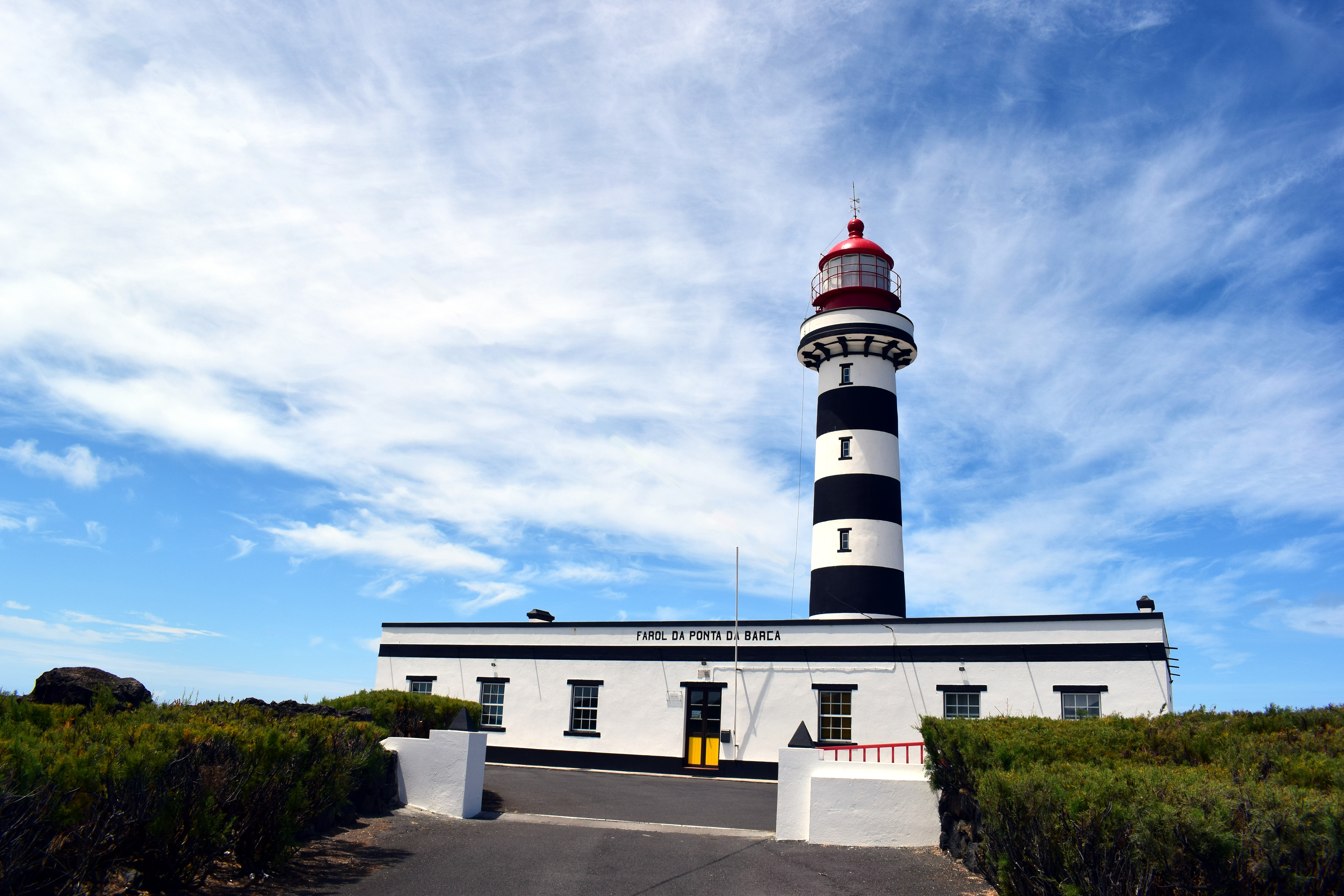
- A view of the lighthouse of Ponta da Barca, a sentinel on the northern coast of Graciosa
- Location: Graciosa, Santa Cruz da Graciosa, Portugal
- Coordinates: 39°05′37″N 28°02′58″W

Tower
- Constructed: 1930
- Construction: concrete
- Automated: 1999
- Height: 23 m (75 ft)
- Shape: cylindrical tower with balcony and lantern rising from a 1-story keeper's house
- Markings: white and black bands tower, red lantern dome
- Heritage: heritage without legal protection

Light
- Focal height: 71 m (233 ft)
- Lens: 500 mm focal distance
- Intensity: 1,000 watt
- Range: 20 nmi (37 km; 23 mi)
- Characteristic: Fl W 7s
- Portugal no.: PT-797

The Lighthouse of Ponta da Barca (Portuguese: Farol da Ponta da Barca) is a beacon/lighthouse located along the 24 metres (79 ft) cliffs of Ponta da Barca, near the hamlet of Bom Jesus, civil parish of Santa Cruz da Graciosa on the island of the same, the Portuguese archipelago of the Azores. Immediately near the lighthouse, is the emblematic baleia de pedra (whale rock), a curious geological basaltic rock that has resisted erosion, in the shape of a whale. The lighthouse includes a symmetrical single-floor building, and a 23-metre (75 ft) high cylindrical tower that extends its lamp to 71 metres (233 ft) above the ocean surface. It is considered a second-order lighthouse, which began operating on 1 February 1930.

The lighthouse, denoted as 797 (Internationally recognized as D-2676) is equipped with a 3-order lenticular dioptric lamp with a 500 millimetres (20 in) focal distance, manufactured in 1927. Initially the beacon was produced by a mechanical system that rotated the incandescent lamp every 5 seconds, powered by a diesel engine (and with a butane reserve).

== History ==
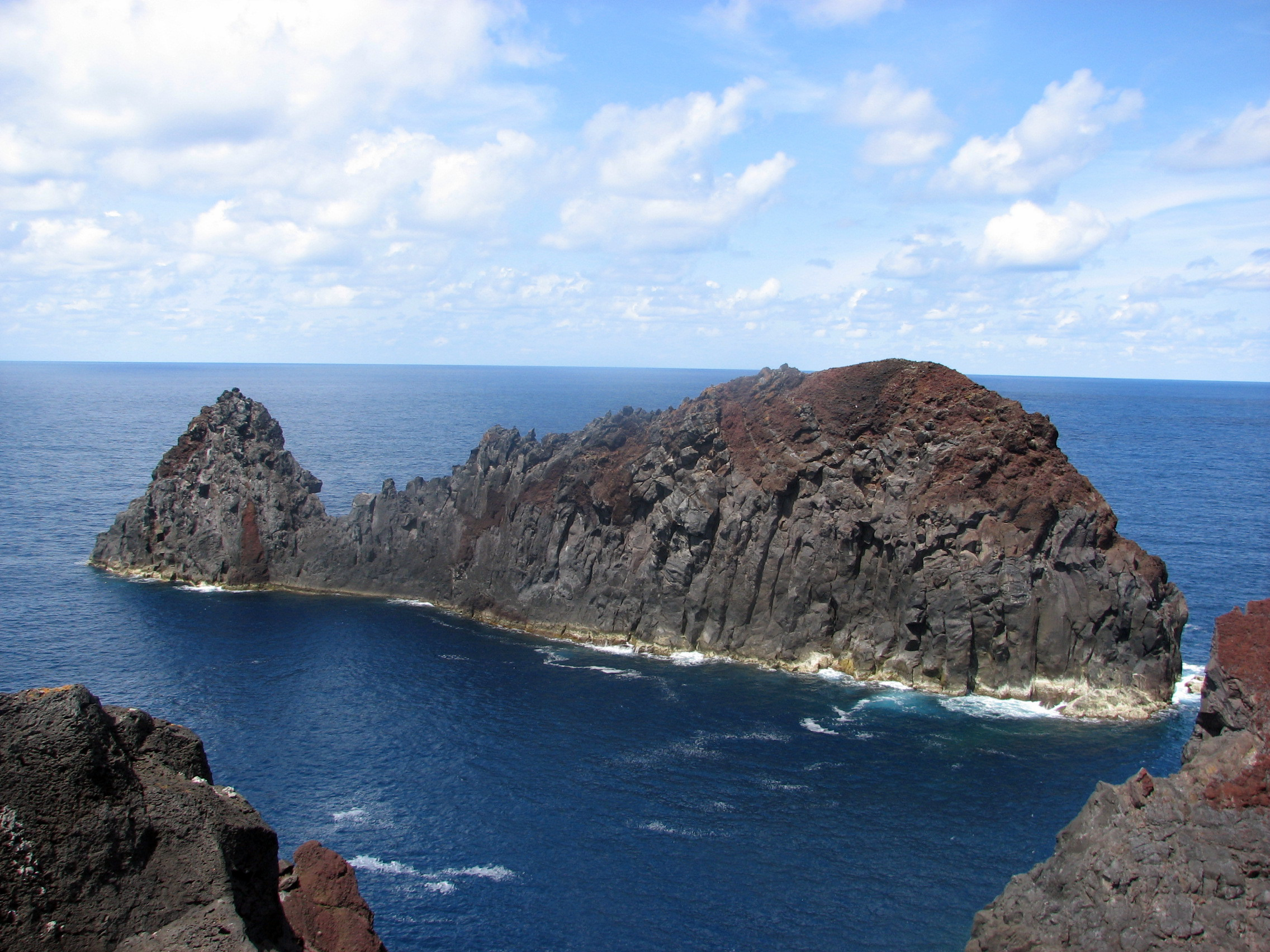
The Whale Islet, located in the northern coast, adjacent to the Ponta da Baraca Lighthouse

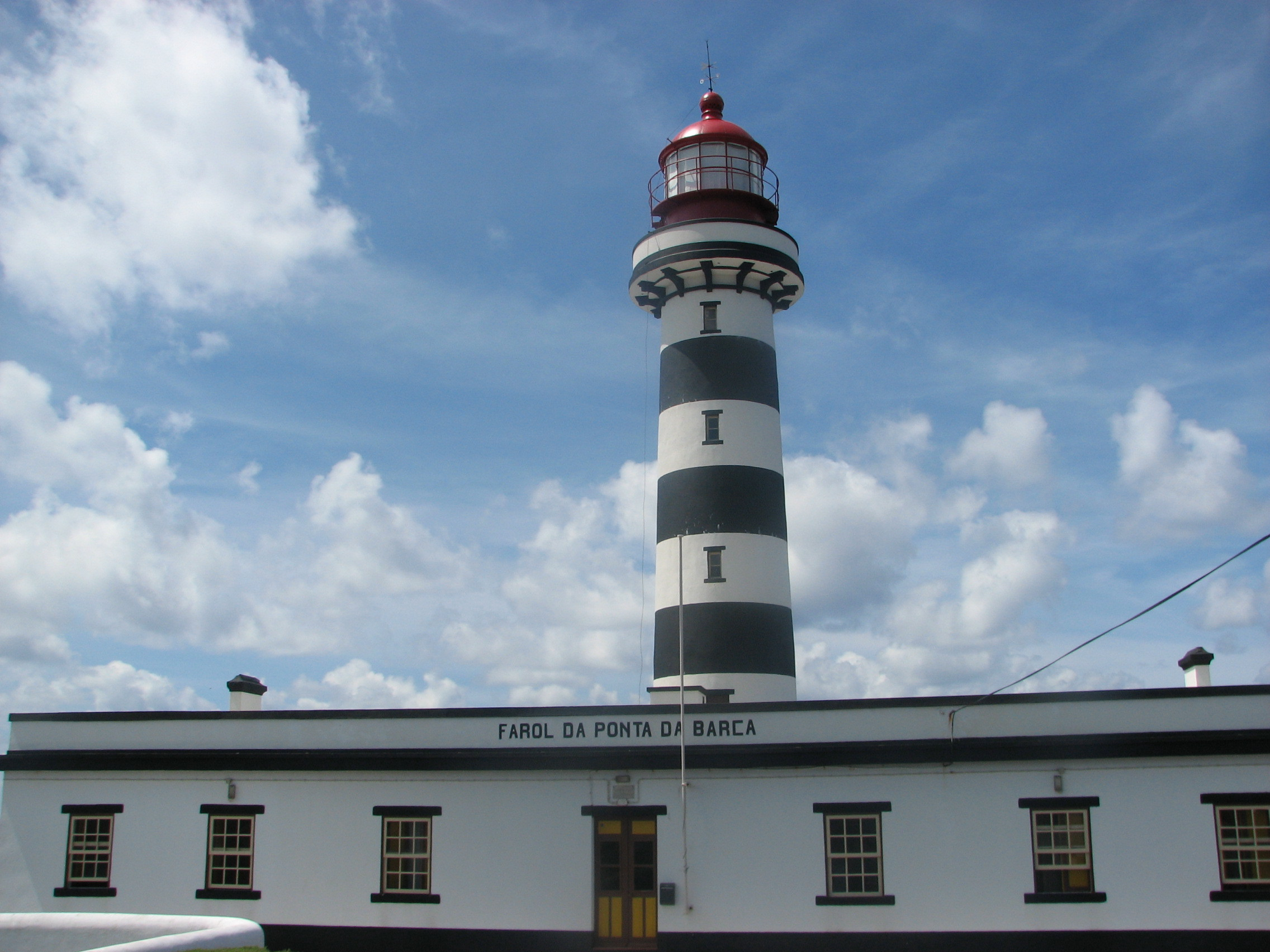
The main tower of the lighthouse

The General Plan for Lighthouses of 1883, documents the necessity of installing a lighthouse on top of Pico Negro, a volcanic cone located 500 metres (1,600 ft) to the southeast of Ponta da Barca.

Difficulties in accessibility and problems with the geomorphology of the area brought the planners to the conclusion that Ponta da Barca would be a more suitable alternative (although the interposition of Pico Negro did not permit some visibility from Ponta da Barca). The new selection, was acceptable to the Comissão dos Faróis e Balizas (Commission on Lighthouses and Beacons), which concluded in 1902 that although the economically small lighthouse would be able to support ships travelling from the north.

Although included in the 1883 Lighthouse Plan, and its location selected in 1902, it was not until 1927 when the equipment, optics and lantern were purchased from France (for 804,200 francs). The lighthouse was constructed in 1930, with beacon began functioning along Ponta da Barca on 1 February 1930 (purchased by Barbier, Bénard & Turenne) using a third-order diotropic optical system, with a focal distance of 500 millimetres (20 in). Isolated in the northwest coast of Graciosa, a road was constructed in 1935 by the District Government of Angra do Heroísmo to link the lighthouse to Santa Cruz (supported by 6000$00 escudos from Lighthouse Commission).

The original lighthouse building had initially consisted of two living quarters for the lighthouse keepers. After 1952 a third space, and then a fourth were added, in order support four lighthouse keepers. The lighthouse was electrified in 1958, with the mounting of two groups of generators, with the beacon being upgraded to an incandescent 3000 Watts/110 Volt lamp, with a range of 41 nautical miles (76 km): the diesel supported incandescent lamp was placed on reserve. In the 1980s, the lamp was substituted for a 1000 Watt bulb, at 120 Volts, but reducing the luminosity to 20 nautical miles (37 km). The lighthouse joined the municipal power-grid in 1999, and services became automated through DF model system.

The lighthouse is today the tallest tower in the Azores, in an intemperate zones; in 1978 an intense lightning storm caused large damage in the lighthouse and lighthouse keeper's quarters. The 1 January 1980 earthquake caused damage to the lighthouse with landslides occurring around the clifftop: its beacon continued to function.

== See also ==
- List of lighthouses in Portugal
