= Santa Cruz da Graciosa (parish) =

Santa Cruz
- Civil parish
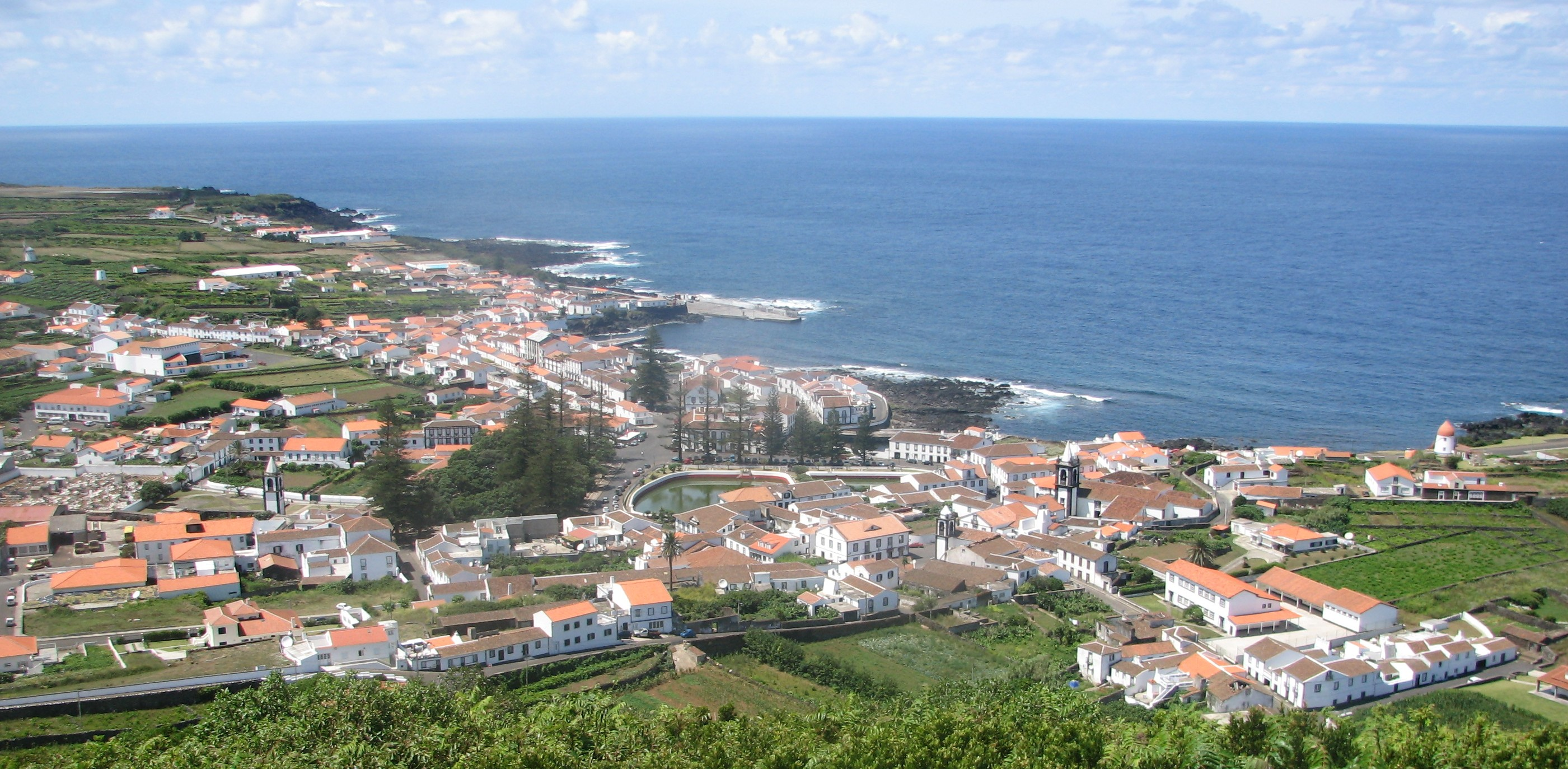
- The civil parish of Santa Cruz das Flores, as seen from Monte da Ajuda, looking to the northeast

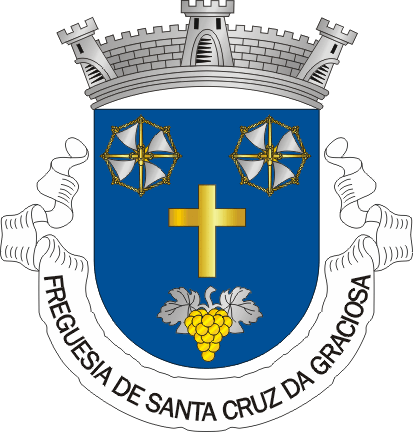
- Coat of arms

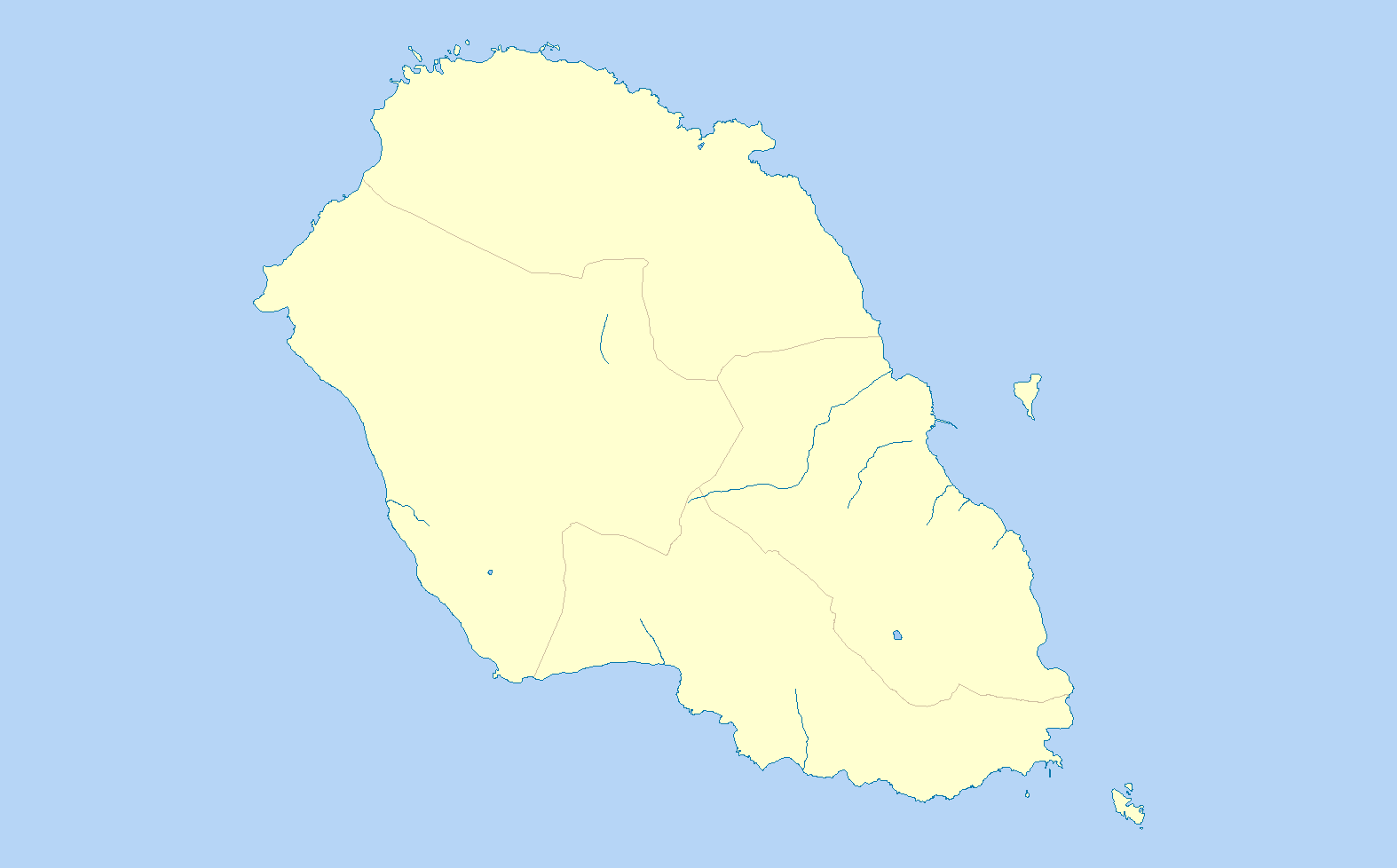
- Location in the Azores Santa Cruz (Graciosa)
- Coordinates: 39°5′2″N 28°0′6″W
- Country: Portugal
- Auton. region: Azores
- Island: Graciosa
- Municipality: Santa Cruz da Graciosa
- Established: Parish: c. 1470

Area
  - Total: 15.52 km^{2} (5.99 sq mi)
- Elevation: 31 m (102 ft)

Population (2011)
  - Total: 1,776
  - Density: 114.4/km^{2} (296.4/sq mi)
- Time zone: UTC−01:00 (AZOT)
  - Summer (DST): UTC+00:00 (AZOST)
- Postal code: 9880-378
- Area code: 292
- Patron: Santa Cruz
- Website: www.jf-santacruz.com

Santa Cruz da Graciosa is a civil parish in the municipality of the same name on the volcanic island of Graciosa, in the Portuguese archipelago of the Azores. The parish occupies the northeastern corner of the island and is the home of the municipal seat, as well as the economic center concentrating most municipal services, in addition to the main airport and port. The population in 2011 was 1,776, in an area of 15.52 km^{2}.

== Geography ==
Much like the rest of the settlements on Graciosa, although the communities are relatively disperse, they are concentrated along the roadways. The village and hamlets that formed were typical of the zones of colonizations, concentrating primarily in the northeast coast, then extending into the interior. Consequently, several agglomerations have developed in this parish:

- Santa Cruz – the most important location on the island, urbanized, with many of the classical Azorean villages (a historic center, oriented towards the sea and many of the structures of public interest;
- Santo Amaro, Rebentão and Covas – the urban periphery and suburb of the town of Santa Cruz: Rebentão has a traditional império; Santo Amaro the site of the Chapel of Santo Amaro (constructed between 1693 and 1705), the site of agricultural services, home of the dairy factory and UNICOL (União de Cooperativas) and center of dairy commercial products destined for export;
- Fontes – a compact center, located along the hills of Serra das Fontes, it is situated between 120 and 150 meters above sea level, between agricultural lands, semi-permanent pasture lands and wild terrains. It once had a substantial population, but emigration has diminished the number of residents, and the local primary school was closed in 2002;
- Funchais – situated two kilometers from the village of Santa Cruz, near the volcanic crater of Pico do Hortelã and substantial enough to have its own império;
- Dores – located north of Pico Jardim, it is a place on the outer periphery of the village and located near the Graciosa aerodrome (constructed in the area of Barro Vermelho), it has an império and its Chapel of Senhora das Dores is one of the older religious structures on the island, constructed in the 18th century, by António da Silva Sodré, in 1793. The civil parish's volunteer fire department, and the home to the Adega Cooperativa da Graciosa (wine industry);
- Cruz do Barro – also in the area of the airport, is a small wine-producing area where few people currently reside;
- Bom Jesus – a small settlement in the extreme northern coast lying on the plain of Achada (near Pico das Bichas and Pico do Barroso), near the frontier with the civil parish of Guadalupe. It too lost its only primary school in 1990, it is currently recognized for the Chapel of Bom Jesus, and its religious square, constructed in 1636 and then remodeled subsequently in 1786 and 1902.

== Bibliography ==
- Ferreira, António de Brum (1966) [1968]. A Ilha Graciosa. 8 (in Portuguese) (2nd ed.). Lisbon: Livros Horizonte, Colecção Espaço e Sociedade. ISBN 972-9216-70-3.
- Costa, Félix José da Costa (1966) [1845]. Memória Estatística e Histórica da Ilha Graciosa. 8 (3rd ed.). Angra do Heroísmo: Instituto Açoriano de Cultura. ISBN 978-972-9213-77-9.
- DREP, ed. (1978). Aspectos demográficos. Açores - 78. Angra do Heroísmo: Departamento de Estudos e Planeamento dos Açores.
- Monterey, Guido de (1981). Graciosa e São Jorge (Açores) – Duas ilhas no centro do arquipélago. Oporto: Sociedade de Papelaria, Lda.
- Luís Daniel, ed. (2004). Graciosa – Guia do Património Cultural. Lisbon: Atlantic View. ISBN 972-96057-4-2.
