= Praia (Santa Cruz da Graciosa) =

São Mateus
- Civil parish
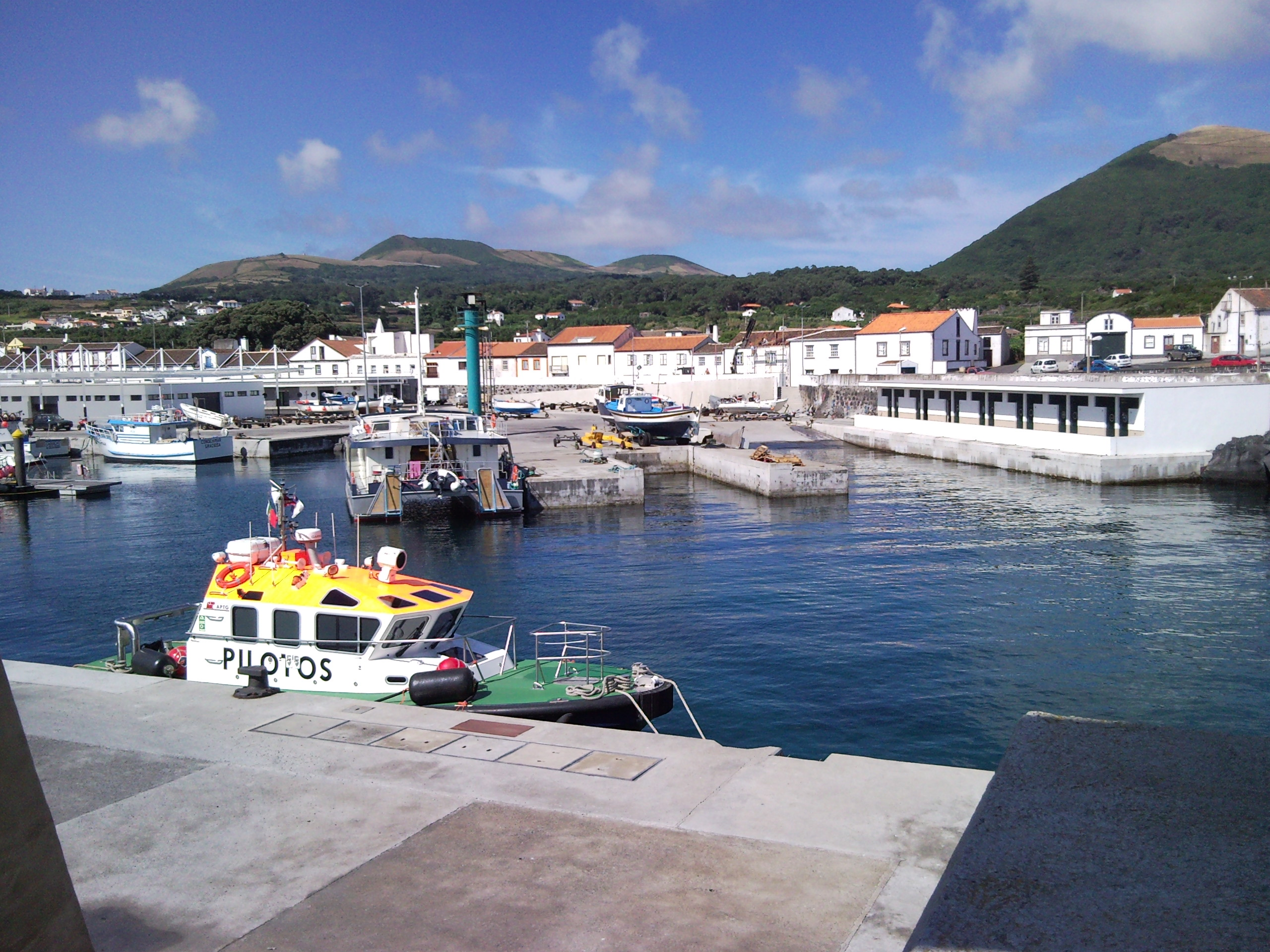
- The main harbour in Praia

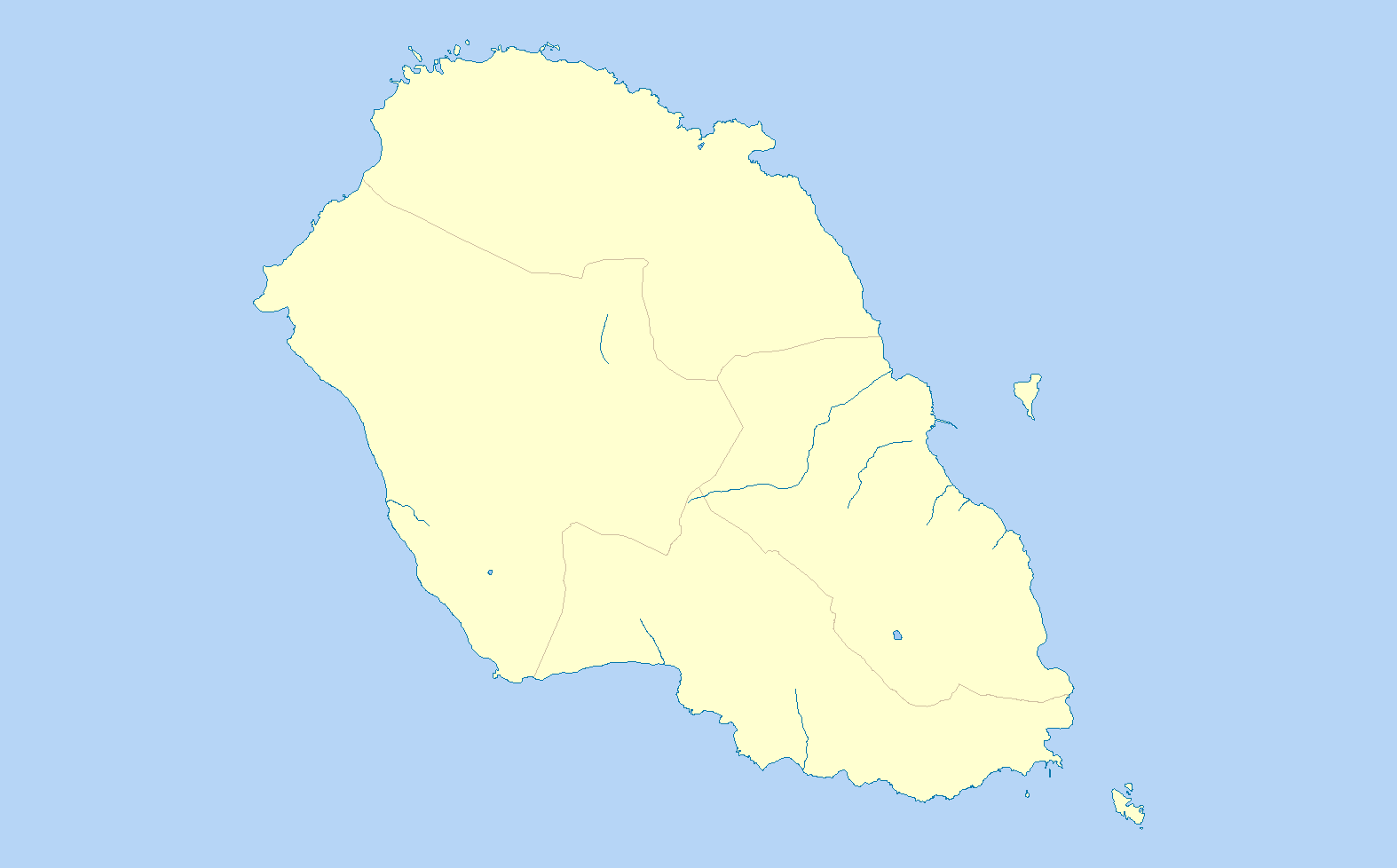
- Location in the Azores São Mateus (Graciosa)
- Coordinates: 39°2′35″N 27°58′37″W
- Country: Portugal
- Auton. region: Azores
- Island: Graciosa
- Municipality: Santa Cruz da Graciosa
- Established: Civil parish: 1 April 1546

Area
  - Total: 12.82 km^{2} (4.95 sq mi)
- Elevation: 150 m (490 ft)

Population (2011)
  - Total: 836
  - Density: 65.2/km^{2} (169/sq mi)
- Time zone: UTC−01:00 (AZOT)
  - Summer (DST): UTC+00:00 (AZOST)
- Postal code: 9880-207
- Area code: (+351) 292 XXX XXX
- Patron: São Mateus
- Website: viladapraiagraciosa.com

Praia (officially São Mateus) is a Portuguese civil parish in the municipality of Santa Cruz da Graciosa, on the island of Graciosa, in the Azores. It still retains its former name Praia locally, owing to the parish having once been the historical municipality of Praia. The population in 2011 was 836, in an area of 12.82 km².

== History ==
São Mateus was one of the first Captaincies of the Azores, and administered by its Captain-Donatorio, Duarte Barreto.

The main centre and parish seat obtained the category, and elevated to the title, of vila (or town) during the reign of King John III, by royal charter on 1 April 1546. It operated as the municipal seat until 1867, when its role was superseded by the much larger Santa Cruz da Graciosa. Yet, it still retained the honorific title of vila. During this time, the settlers of the island formed historical, social and economic contacts with the peoples and economy of Terceira, in addition to those ships travelling between Europe and Brazil.

In the 16th century it had become a rich parish, and competed with Santa Cruz. In 1890, there were over 1783 inhabitants, but it had already begun a slow decline. Part of the population emigrated to the United States or Canada, while the remaining population relied primarily on a subsistence lifestyle for local consumption.

== Geography ==
Within an area of less than 13 kilometres square, the parish includes various individual rural localities, including Vila da Praia, Fenais, Fonte do Mato, Lagoa, Pedras Brancas and Feteira.

The parish occupies the extreme southeast, along a long valley which separates the Caldeira massif from the rest of the island. To the interior the volcanic crater, simply the Calderia (caldera), is the largest volcanic structure on the island. Within its crater, is the Furna do Enxofre, a large cavern and subterranean lake bio-system popular with tourists. Located directly opposite the village is the Praia Islet, an important natural reserve, classified as a "Zone of Special Protection", due to the abundant marine bird species that use it for nesting and as transitory stop in annual migrations.

The population is aging in this community, and is shifting into a bedroom community of the much larger Santa Cruz.

== Economy ==
In addition to agriculture, a staple of the fertile lands of the Azores, Praia has been known for being an important fishing community and supplier for the economy of Graciosa. In addition to fish, fisherman have collected and dried algae (Sargassum) as fertilizer. Similarly, Graciosense were producers of tile, for the regional market, resulting in periods of boom.

Other complementary activities, in addition to the small garages and mechanical shops, the parish is a center of civil construction and bread makers, and has an outpost of the fiscal auditors, customs, post office and bank.
