= Graciosa =

Island of the Azores, Portugal

Native name: Ilha Graciosa Nickname: Ilha Branca
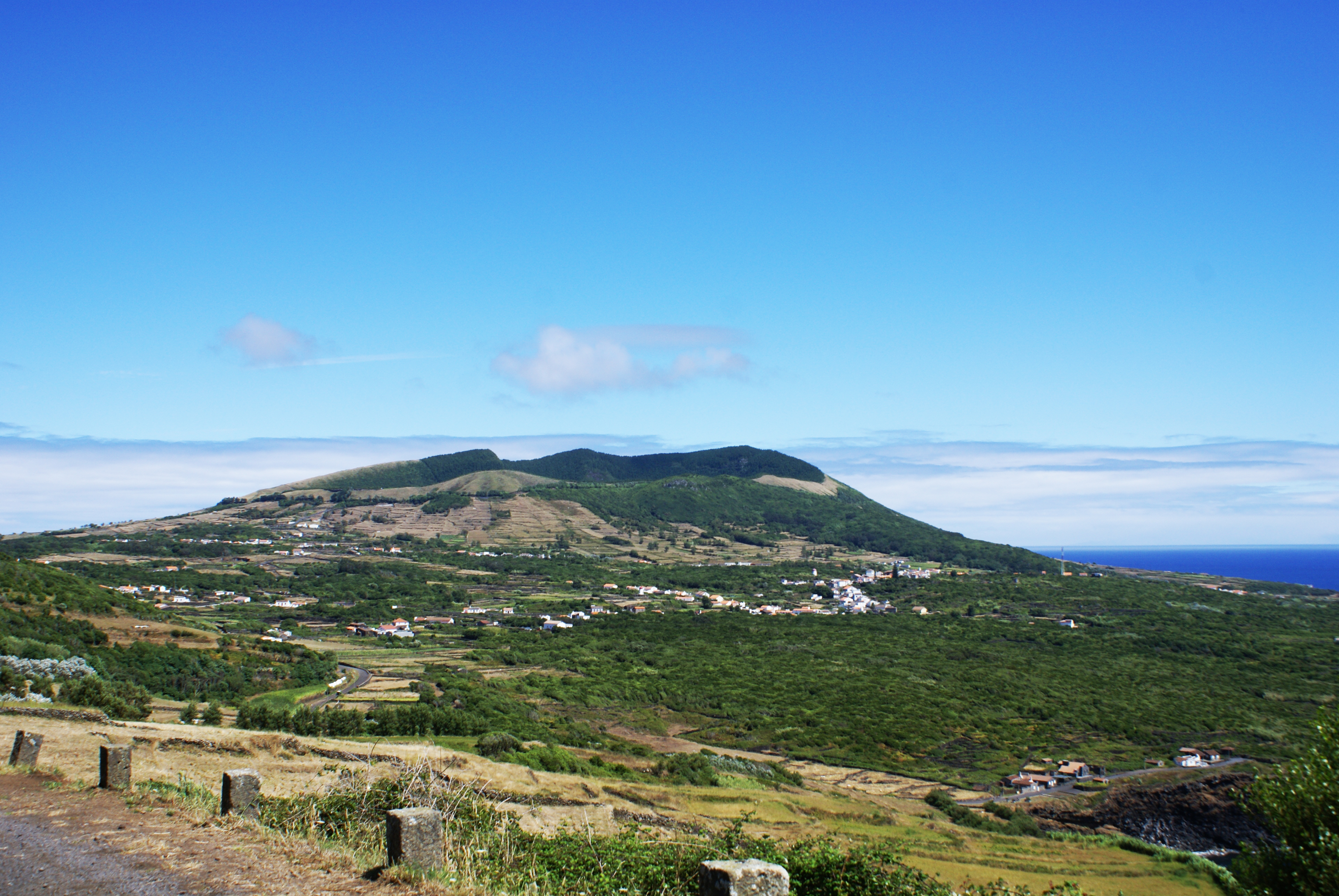
- South-east side of the island of Graciosa, with the Caldeira Massif in the background.

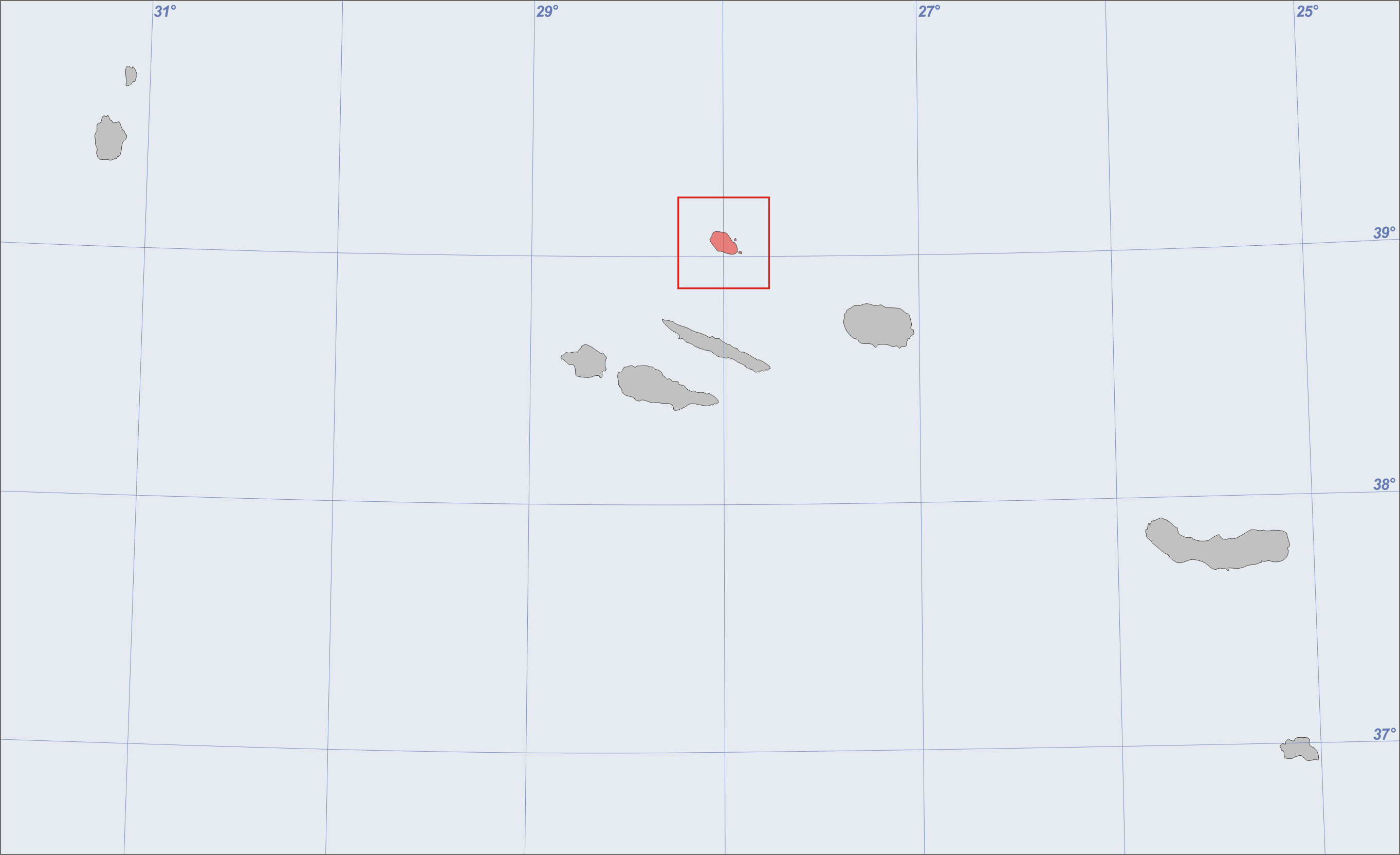
- Location of the island of Graciosa in the archipelago of the Azores

Geography
- Location: Atlantic Ocean
- Coordinates: 39°3′5″N 28°0′51″W
- Area: 60.65 km^{2} (23.42 sq mi)
- Highest elevation: 375 m (1230 ft)
- Highest point: Pico do Facho

Administration
- Portugal
- Autonomous Region: Azores

Demographics
- Demonym: Graciosense
- Population: ▼4,091 (2021)

Graciosa Island (Portuguese pronunciation: [ɡɾɐsiˈɔzɐ]) (literally "graceful" or "enchanting" in Portuguese), also referred to as the White Island, is a volcanic island in the Atlantic Ocean. It is the northernmost of the Central Group of islands in the Azores archipelago. The ovular Portuguese island has an area of 60.65 square kilometres (23.42 square miles), a length of 10 kilometres (6.2 miles) and a width of 7 kilometres (4.3 miles). Its landscape is dominated by a 1.6-kilometre-wide (1.0-mile) central caldera (the Caldeira) located in the southeast.

== History ==
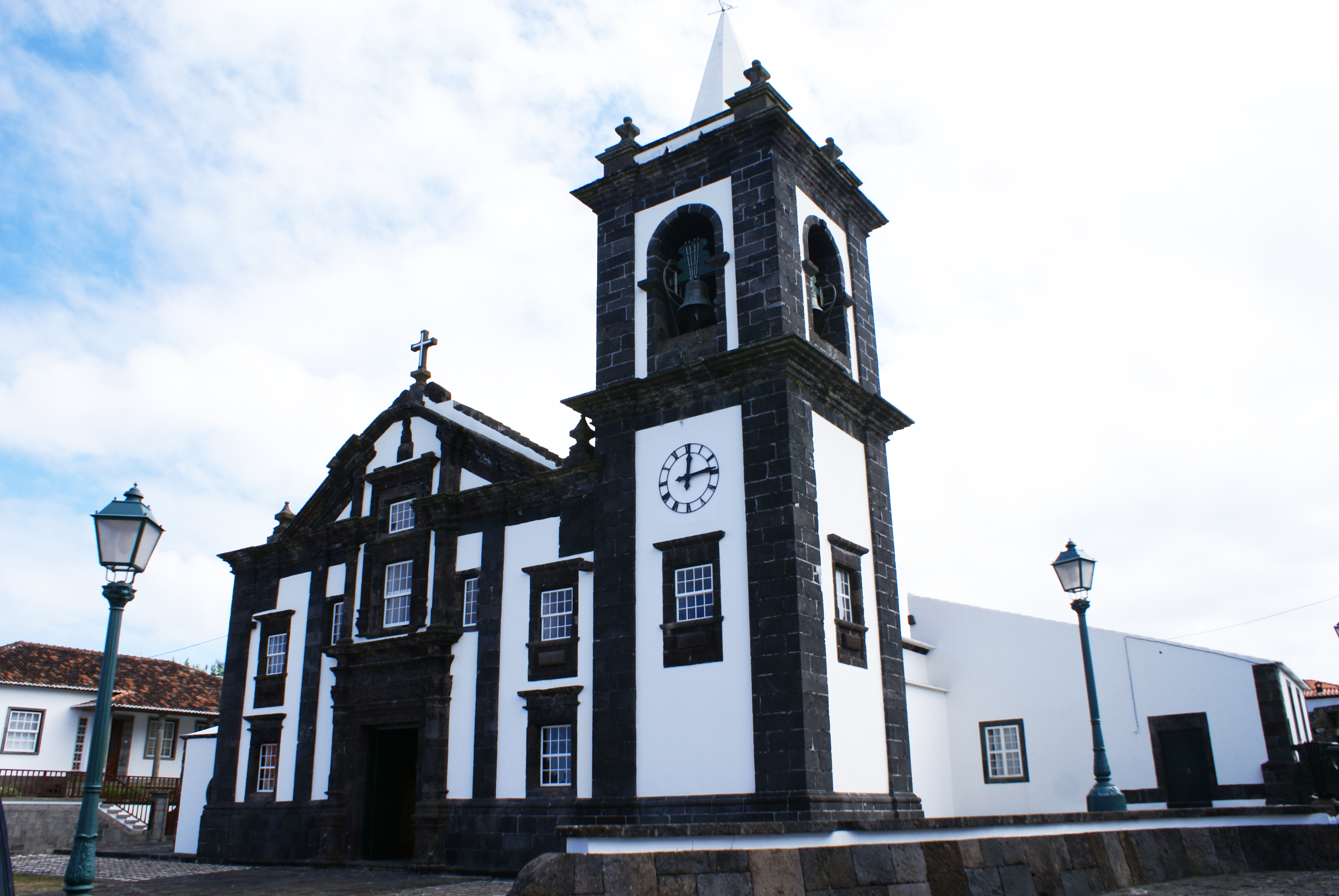
The historical parochial church of Santa Cruz in the village of Santa Cruz da Graciosa

In addition to the other islands of the Central Group, Graciosa was explored by Portuguese navigators during the first quarter of the 15th century, although there exist no accounts of the first sighting of the island. 2 May 1450 has frequently been referred to as the date of the island's "discovery", although there exists no documentation to support this date. Paradoxically, it is clear that in 1440, by order of Prince Henry the Navigator, cattle and swine were settled on the island in order to facilitate colonization.

Similarly, it is unclear the names of the first settlers to colonise the island because around 1450 formal registries did not exist. The first group of settlers of note to be mentioned were led by Vasco Gil Sodré, a former resident of Montemor-o-Velho, who arrived from Terceira accompanied by his family and servants around the middle of the 1450s. It was this pioneer who inaugurated the official phase of continuous settlement on the island.

The first population centre was in Carapacho, a zone in the southeast of the island where it is likely that settlers made landfall. Owing to the area's poor fertility and lack of shelter from the sea, the settlers moved further into the interior. In a few years, a nucleus formed on the northern coast near Barra and Santa Cruz, in order to take advantage of the sheltered coves and access to potable waters from the tidal ponds/wells. From here the colony that would become the village of Santa Cruz da Graciosa would form.

The first Captain-Donatário, Vasco Gil Sodré, was diligent in his duties, establishing a customs-house for the more fertile and ample lands in the northern part of the island, while his brother-in-law Duarte Barreto do Couto was able to coopt the southern part of the island into a second captaincy around the village of Praia. After 1485 the Captaincy of Graciosa was unified under the administration of Pedro Correia da Cunha, Second Captain of Porto Santo (Madeira) and brother-in-law of Christopher Columbus. Taking his family to Graciosa, he settled in Santa Cruz, moving the municipal seat and supplanting Praia as the administrative centre. The following year Santa Cruz was elevated to "village" and municipality, under the religious parishes of Santa Cruz and São Mateus da Praia. The change caused an influx of settlers from Beiras, Minho and Flanders (in the Habsburg Netherlands) permitting the installation of the first municipal structures (in this case the construction of the Santa Cruz lighthouse in 1486).

With low costs that permitted easy offloading in multiple ports and a small population, the island prospered, before becoming the target of attacks by pirates and privateers during the 16th and 17th centuries. In addition to several sackings and general destruction of buildings, the local population were regularly captured. Even under these circumstances, the island was able to continue to support a considerable population, which included original settlers tied to the nobility (specifically from the island of Terceira).

From the earliest settlement, the island survived on agriculture and the wine industry. Given the fertility of the soils and favourable climate, the locals were able to export wheat, barley, wine and local spirits, maintaining an active commerce with Terceira, then the largest port, centre of commerce and administration of the archipelago.

The island's position in the Central Group and its proximity to Terceira made Graciosa, deliberately or not, an important point along trans-Atlantic navigation. Several historical figures passed through the waters of Santa Cruz including Father António Vieira, a victim of a shipwreck near Corvo who was deposited in the regional capital by a Dutch privateer. In 1791, the French writer François-René de Chateaubriand visited the island while journeying to North America, staying at the Franciscan Convent. The poet Almeida Garrett, also visited his uncle (a judge in Santa Cruz) in 1814 at the age of 15. In 1879, Prince Albert I of Monaco, while visiting the Azores on-board his yacht Hirondelle, made port in Graciosa during his oceanographic studies of marine life. He visited Furna do Enxofre, in the centre of the Caldeira, and was the first to remark that the area should be given adequate installations to provide tourist access to the geological site. On a tragic note, it was at dusk on 13 July 1929, during an emergency landing around the fields of Brasileira, that an Amiot 123 biplane piloted by two Polish pilots crashed. The plane had departed Paris-Le Bourget in an attempt at the first Polish trans-Atlantic crossing to New York. While co-pilot Kazimierz Kubala survived with only slight injuries, Ludwik Idzikowski died in the accident, while the plane was engulfed in flames (burning the deceased body of Idzikowski). A cross was raised to mark the site of the accident.

Throughout its history the island has experienced many natural crises resulting in general suffering and some deaths. In the summer of 1844, during a heatwave, wherein agriculture was fatally affected and the risk of death to animals and settlers was grave, José Silvestre Ribeiro (then Administrator General of the District of Angra do Heroísmo), sent 90 wooden barrels with water and ordered the digging of several tidal wells and trenches to carry water from the mountains. These measures were instrumental in alleviating the conditions on the island, along with a strong storm on the night of 20 August. The island has also suffered many seismic events, including on 13 June 1730, when an earthquake near Luz caused damage to many homes and severely damaged the parochial church. Further earthquakes occurred in March 1787 and in 1817 without causing considerable damage. But in 1837 earthquakes around 12 January and at the end of February left most homes in Praia with some damage. The church in Luz almost collapsed and many died. The area of Luz, specifically around Carapacho, in addition to areas in the neighbouring parish of Guadalupe, were also affected by the 1980 earthquake, with general destruction in residential areas.

Due to emigration to the Americas during the 1950s to 1970s, Graciosa underwent a general decrease in demographics that has affected the socio-economic stability of the island community.

In 2010, the island of Graciosa joined the international network for verification of the Comprehensive Nuclear-Test-Ban Treaty through the installation of a monitoring station. This was announced by Regional President Carlos César during a visit to the island, which included the inauguration of the new Furna do Enxofre Visitor Centre and the signing of agreements for the construction of a new Medical Centre on Graciosa.

== Geography ==
=== Physical geography ===
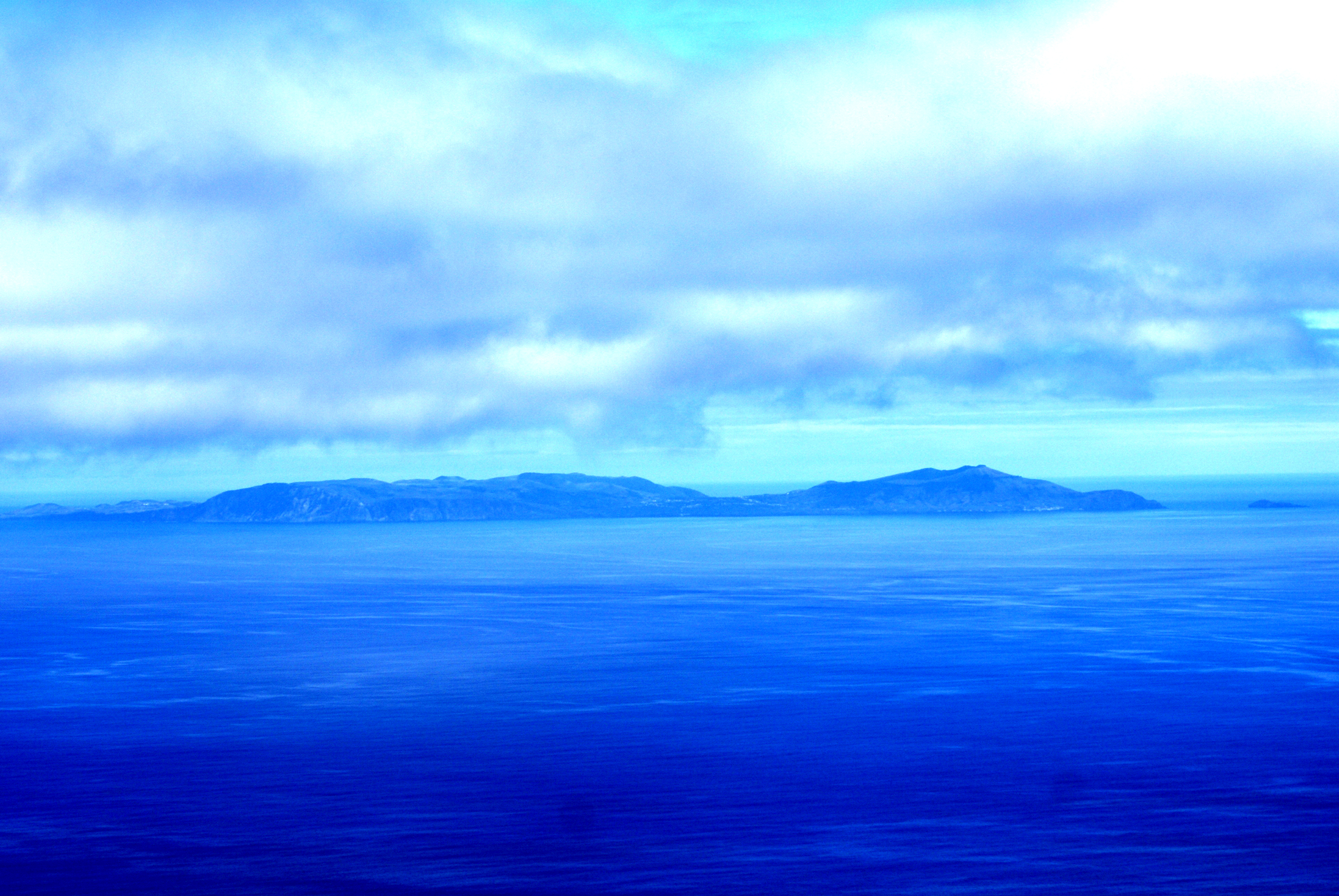
Santa Cruz da Graciosa, as seen from Velas, São Jorge

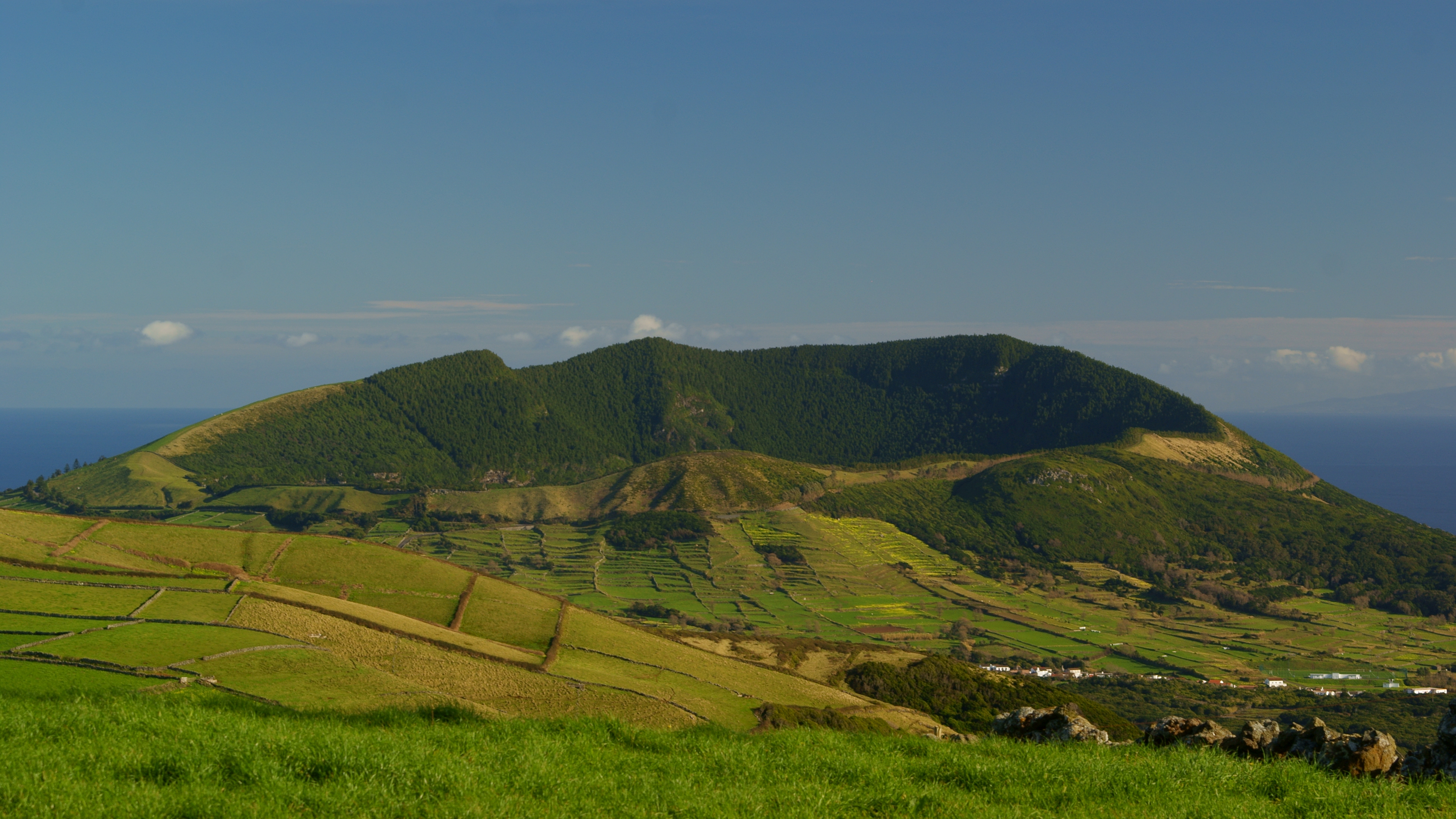
The Caldeira Massif, located at the south-east end of Graciosa island

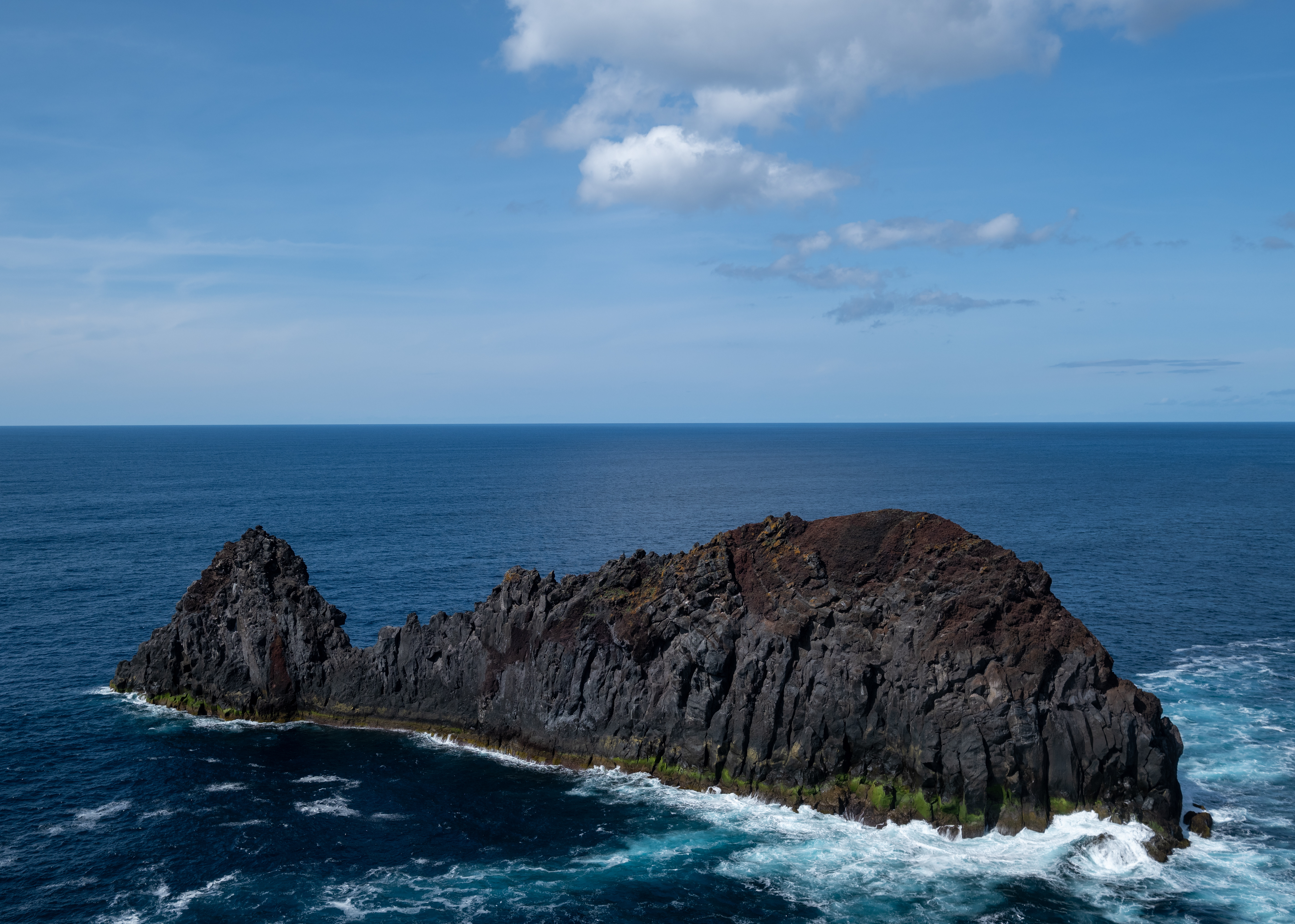
Ponta da Barca, emblematic of the island of Graciosa

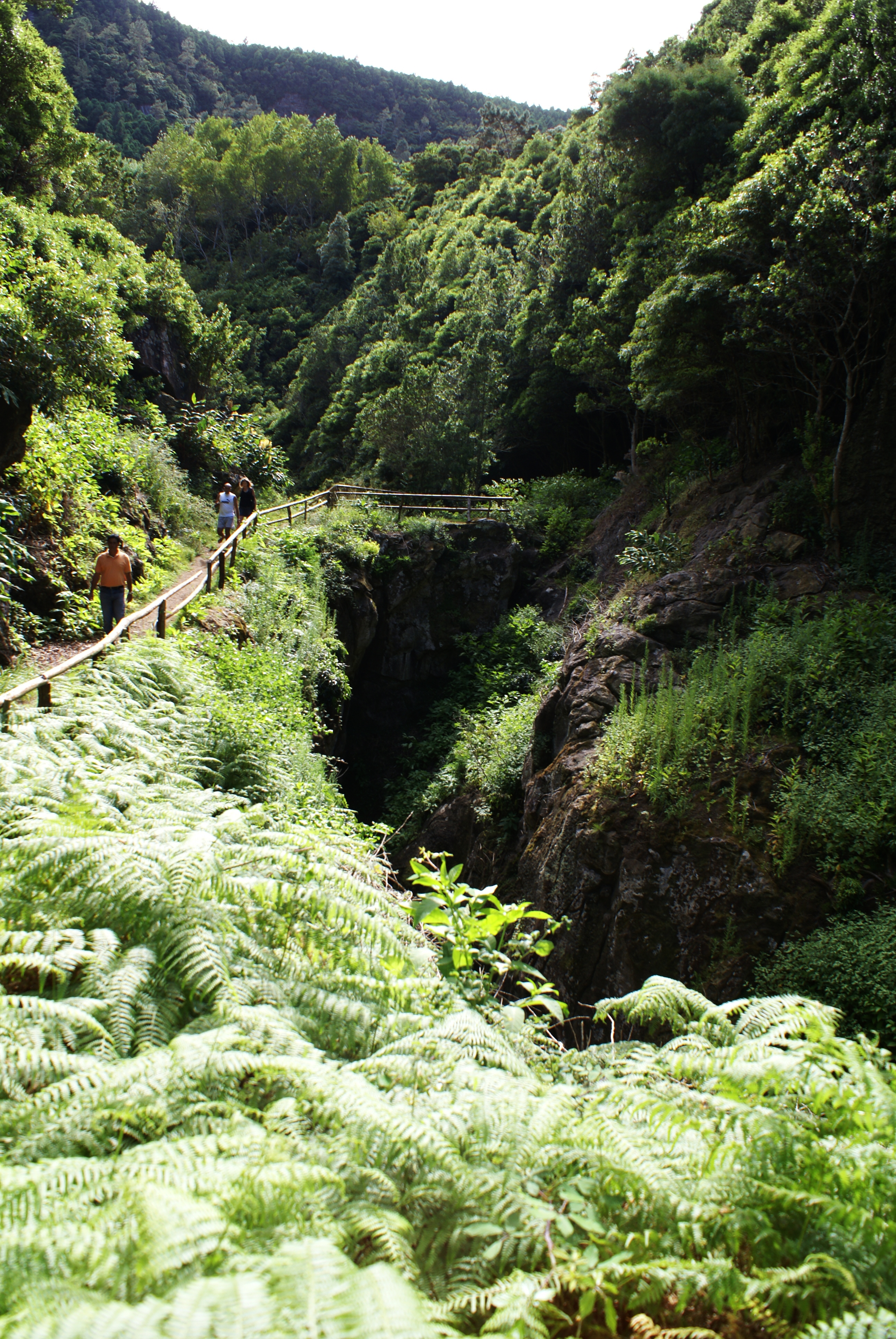
Path to the Caldeira Massif

Graciosa Island is situated in the northwest tectonic structure called the Terceira Rift, oriented southeast to northwest and coincident with the orientation of the archipelago. The presence of the Rift has deformed Graciosa into an elongated oval form 12.5 km long by 7.5 km wide.

The coast is rough and rocky but generally low, except in the northwest along the Serra Branca (where the cliffs are 200 meters high). There are two shallow bays, situated in the southeast and southwest corresponding to fishing ports in Vila da Praia and Folga, respectively. Along the northeast coast there are several smaller coves near Santa Cruz da Graciosa that were used as ports but are now abandoned, and the older whale and commercial port in Barra, now used as a recreational zone.

The interior of the island is generally flat and dotted by numerous volcanic cones, with a southern portion of the island higher in altitude. The island is divided into four geomorphological zones:

- The Caldeira Massif, in the extreme southeast of the island, comprising a well-preserved volcano and caldera;
- Serra das Fontes, located along the northeast coast, a zone of cliffs and escarpments formed by local tectonics;
- The Serra Dormida and Serra Branca Volcanic Complexes, occupying a third of the central island, and weathered by local tectonics;
- The Santa Cruz Platform, occupying the northwest of the island, characterized by a relief that is gently sloping (approximately 50 meters) and punctuated by several volcanic cones.

Volcanism on Graciosa was predominantly characterized by low explosivity, although there appear some deposits that show indications of elevated explosivity in its geological record. Aerial volcanism had its beginning approximately 600,000 years ago with the formation of a shield volcano, which is still visible in the Volcanic Complex of Serra Branca (the oldest part of the island). It is a triple junction plate boundary where the North American Plate, Eurasian Plate and Nubian Plate meet.

This was followed by periods of explosivity, related to the faults that traverse the zone, forming numerous cones that constitute a major part of the Serra Dormida and Serra das Fontes region.

The type of volcanism altered radically around 350,000 years ago with the formation of the central volcano (and later caldera) associated with a different magma chamber, resulting in greater explosivity and giving rise to thick sheets of pumice that layered Serra Branca.

The formation of the Santa Cruz Platform comes from the more recent geological volcanism associated with lower explosive basaltic eruptions resulting in numerous cones and sub-aerial deposits that cover the center and northern portions of the island. This phase evolved towards the southeast forming the Caldera Massif and many of the islets and submarine mounts along the coast.

The last phase of the geological history of Graciosa occurred 2,000 years ago, forming Pico Timão and the basaltic flows that are located in the surrounding areas.

== Climate ==
Graciosa has a mixed humid subtropical-Mediterranean climate (Köppen: Cfa-Csa) with mild to warm temperatures year-round, it is also one of the driest islands of the Azores owing it to its relatively low topography.

Climate data for Santa Cruz, Graciosa, 1978-2000, altitude: 25 m (82 ft)
Month	Jan	Feb	Mar	Apr	May	Jun	Jul	Aug	Sep	Oct	Nov	Dec	Year
Mean daily maximum °C (°F)	16.4 (61.5)	16.5 (61.7)	17.2 (63.0)	17.8 (64.0)	19.1 (66.4)	21.4 (70.5)	24.1 (75.4)	25.4 (77.7)	24.4 (75.9)	21.8 (71.2)	19.2 (66.6)	17.6 (63.7)	20.1 (68.1)
Daily mean °C (°F)	14.0 (57.2)	13.9 (57.0)	14.6 (58.3)	15.2 (59.4)	16.4 (61.5)	18.7 (65.7)	21.2 (70.2)	22.3 (72.1)	21.6 (70.9)	19.1 (66.4)	16.7 (62.1)	15.2 (59.4)	17.4 (63.4)
Mean daily minimum °C (°F)	11.7 (53.1)	11.3 (52.3)	12.0 (53.6)	12.5 (54.5)	13.8 (56.8)	16.0 (60.8)	18.2 (64.8)	19.3 (66.7)	18.7 (65.7)	16.5 (61.7)	14.2 (57.6)	12.7 (54.9)	14.7 (58.5)
Average precipitation mm (inches)	79.8 (3.14)	88.0 (3.46)	69.4 (2.73)	57.7 (2.27)	54.9 (2.16)	50.8 (2.00)	27.1 (1.07)	53.0 (2.09)	62.3 (2.45)	90.4 (3.56)	103.7 (4.08)	107.5 (4.23)	844.6 (33.24)
Source: IPMA

Climate data for Serra Branca, elevation: 300 m (980 ft), 1978-1990
Month	Jan	Feb	Mar	Apr	May	Jun	Jul	Aug	Sep	Oct	Nov	Dec	Year
Record high °C (°F)	20.0 (68.0)	18.0 (64.4)	17.5 (63.5)	18.2 (64.8)	20.5 (68.9)	23.0 (73.4)	26.0 (78.8)	26.2 (79.2)	25.5 (77.9)	25.4 (77.7)	20.2 (68.4)	20.0 (68.0)	26.2 (79.2)
Mean daily maximum °C (°F)	13.5 (56.3)	13.3 (55.9)	13.6 (56.5)	14.0 (57.2)	15.6 (60.1)	17.9 (64.2)	20.6 (69.1)	21.8 (71.2)	21.0 (69.8)	18.2 (64.8)	15.9 (60.6)	15.2 (59.4)	16.7 (62.1)
Daily mean °C (°F)	11.3 (52.3)	11.1 (52.0)	11.5 (52.7)	11.8 (53.2)	13.5 (56.3)	15.4 (59.7)	17.7 (63.9)	19.0 (66.2)	18.3 (64.9)	15.6 (60.1)	13.6 (56.5)	12.3 (54.1)	14.3 (57.7)
Mean daily minimum °C (°F)	9.2 (48.6)	8.9 (48.0)	9.4 (48.9)	9.6 (49.3)	11.1 (52.0)	12.9 (55.2)	14.9 (58.8)	16.2 (61.2)	15.6 (60.1)	13.0 (55.4)	11.4 (52.5)	9.9 (49.8)	11.8 (53.3)
Record low °C (°F)	5.0 (41.0)	3.2 (37.8)	4.0 (39.2)	4.2 (39.6)	6.0 (42.8)	6.2 (43.2)	8.2 (46.8)	10.0 (50.0)	8.0 (46.4)	7.0 (44.6)	5.2 (41.4)	4.0 (39.2)	3.2 (37.8)
Average rainfall mm (inches)	85.0 (3.35)	115.2 (4.54)	87.6 (3.45)	81.8 (3.22)	67.4 (2.65)	71.6 (2.82)	39.6 (1.56)	37.3 (1.47)	60.4 (2.38)	90.6 (3.57)	134.1 (5.28)	107.3 (4.22)	977.9 (38.51)
Average relative humidity (%)	87	88	87	87	89	89	87	87	87	87	88	88	88
Source: IPMA

=== Human geography ===
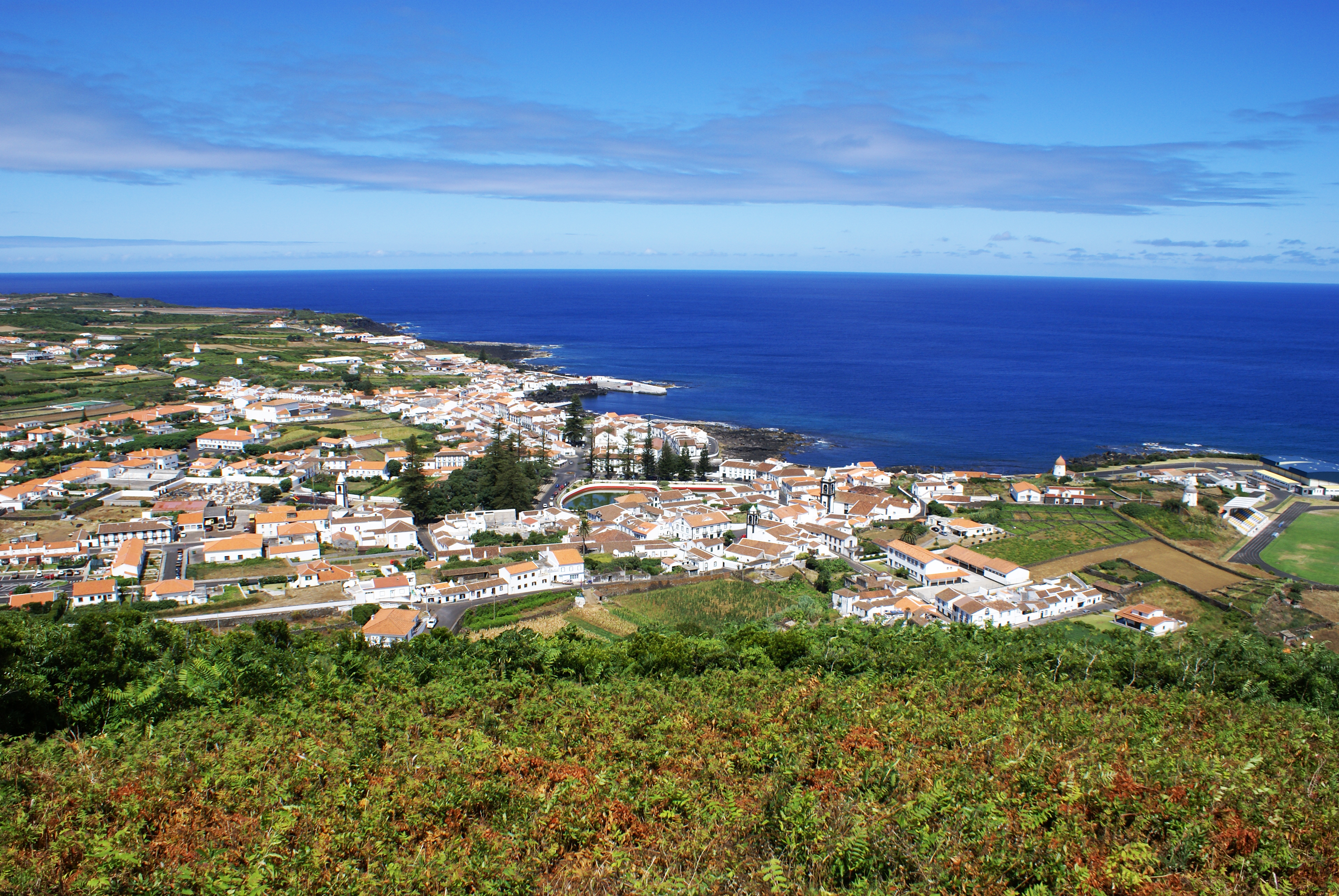
Santa Cruz da Graciosa, the largest settlement on the island

The territory of Graciosa Island consists of one municipality, Santa Cruz da Graciosa (4,780 inhabitants in 2001), divided into four civil parishes:

- Santa Cruz - the seat of the municipality and principal urbanized population on the island, located on eastern coast;
- São Mateus da Praia - a historic village and once municipal seat, until it was unincorporated in the 19th century;
- Guadalupe - the principal rural population on the island;
- Luz - civil parish better known locally as "Sul" (South), located along the southern coast of the island.

== Economy ==
Owing to the concentration of agriculture, animal husbandry and dairy industries, the island has maintained a relatively rural and tranquil character. The island's fields produce various fruits, wines, grass-fed beef and dairy cattle as well as cheese and other dairy products. The construction of a commercial port and the 1980 construction of the Graciosa Aerodrome has retained the island's links to the archipelago while strengthening exports and importing goods and services. In addition to this, the island has benefited from infrastructural investments that have included the re-qualification of the secondary school, the construction of a new milk factory and fishing port. As well, improvements to the recreational areas in Praia and refurbishment of the Thermals in Carapacho, the construction of a new hotel and Medical Center have been done in order to improve both the tourist industry and support the local community.

The first hotel on Graciosa was inaugurated in June 2009. The new Graciosa Resort & Business Hotel in Santa Cruz da Graciosa is part of a series of investments to build infrastructure connected to the tourist economy on Graciosa, such as the Carapacho thermal baths. The new four-star hotel has 120 beds, a restaurant for 100 people, a swimming pool and various services related to its category, having cost seven million Euros. It will be managed by INATEL in a partnership with a group of Azorean business people. The hotel is part of the new Praia fishing port on Graciosa includes a set of floating piers, sea marking, water supply networks and electric grids, houses for fishing

=== Transport ===
The island is served by Graciosa Airport (IATA: GRW, ICAO: LPGR), which is located along the northern coast, as well as daily ferry service by Atlanticoline, the Azores' passenger and cargo service.

== Architecture ==
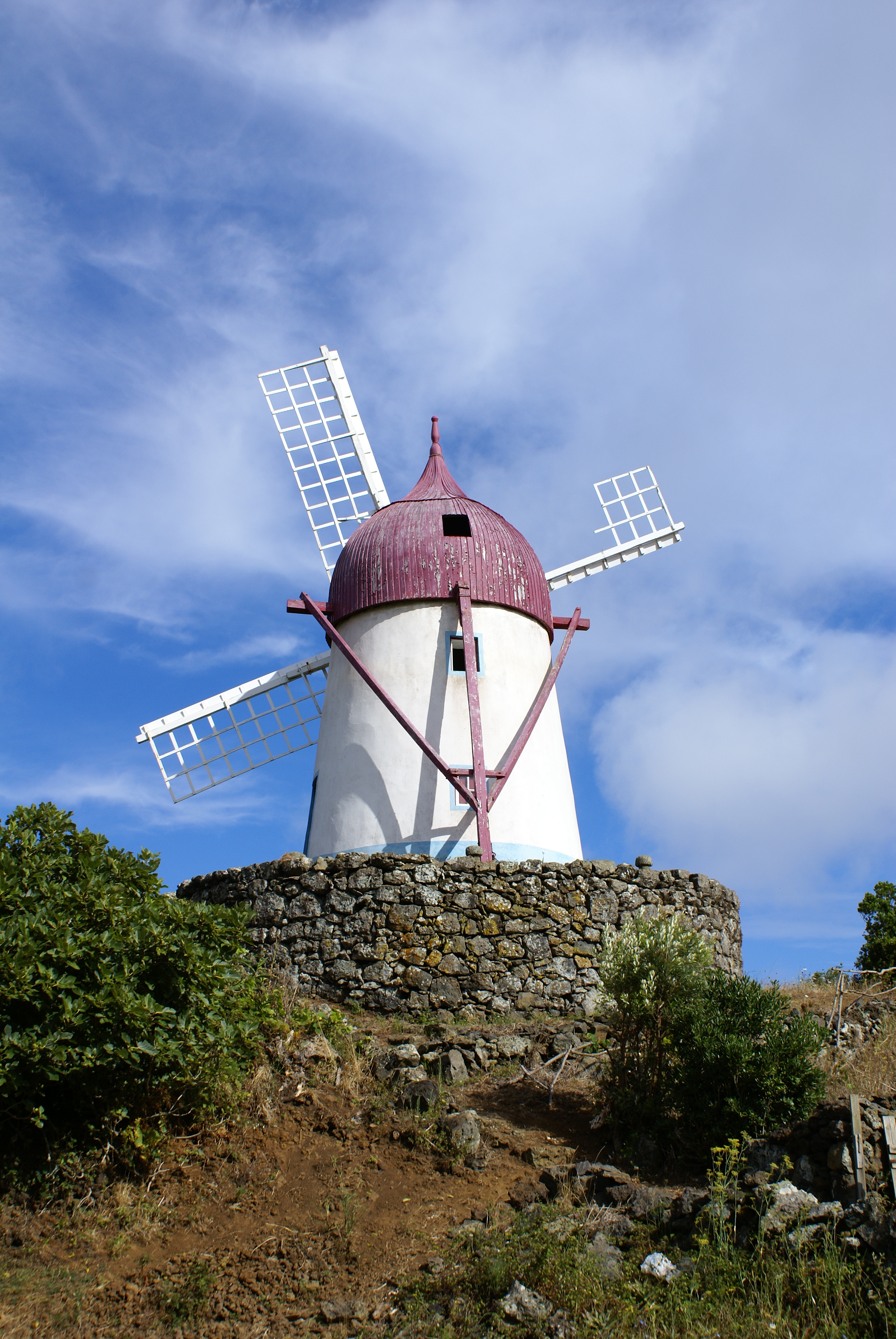
The influence of Flemish citizens is visible in the windmills that dot the landscape of island.

The island of Graciosa is dotted by historical buildings and structures that have made the island's history, through its early discovery to the middle of the Estado Novo era. In addition to the urban nucleus of Santa Cruz da Graciosa, which was classified by IGESPAR as a Group of Public Interest (Portuguese: Núcleo urbano da vila de Santa Cruz da Graciosa/Zona Classificada da Vila de Santa Cruz da Graciosa), there are other buildings, including impérios, windmills and structures used in daily life that were maintained in some form, including the following:

=== Civic ===
- Lighthouse of Carapacho/Ponta da Resting (Portuguese: Farol do Carapacho/Ponta da Restinga)
- Lighthouse of Ponta da Barca (Portuguese: Farol da Ponta da Barca)
- Residence of the Captains-General (Portuguese: Casa dos Capitães-mores)

=== Religious ===
- Church of Nossa Senhora da Luz (Portuguese: Igreja de Nossa Senhora da Luz)
- Church of Santa Cruz da Graciosa (Portuguese: Igreja de Santa Cruz da Graciosa)
- Hermitage of Nossa Senhora da Ajuda (Portuguese: Ermida de Nossa Senhora da Ajuda)
- Hermitage of Nossa Senhora da Guia (Portuguese: Ermida de Nossa Senhora da Guia)

== Sport ==
The sporting club of the island is football/soccer and is part of the Associação de Futebol de Angra do Heroísmo.

== Notable people ==
- Rui Filipe Cunha Correia (born 1995 in Santa Cruz da Graciosa) known as Nené, a footballer with 140 club caps

== See also ==
- Graciosa IPR
- Hermitage of Nossa Senhora da Ajuda (Santa Cruz da Graciosa)
- List of volcanoes in Azores
