= Luz (Santa Cruz da Graciosa) =

- Civil parish
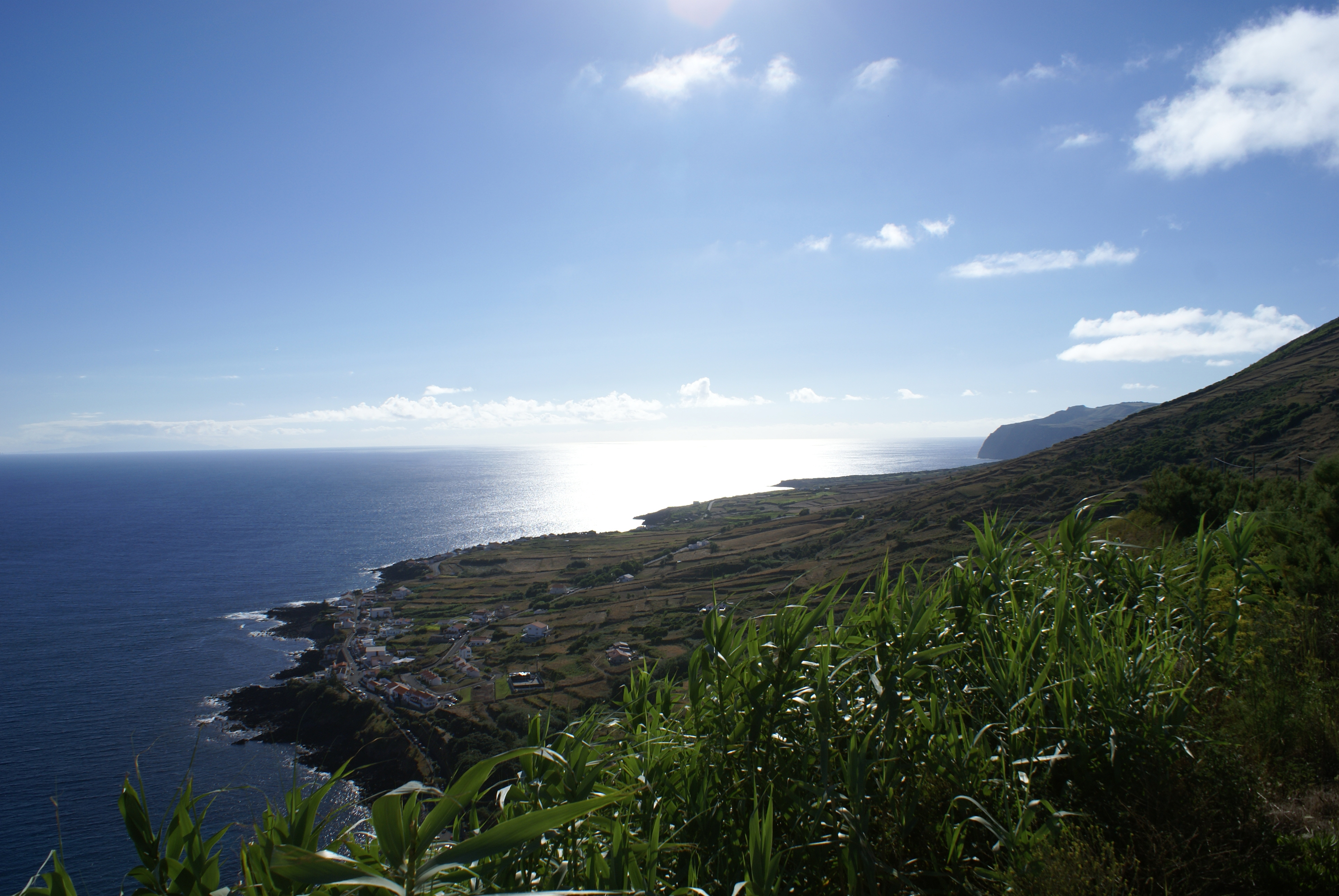
- The most southern community in Luz, Carapacho, as seen from the Ponta da Restinga

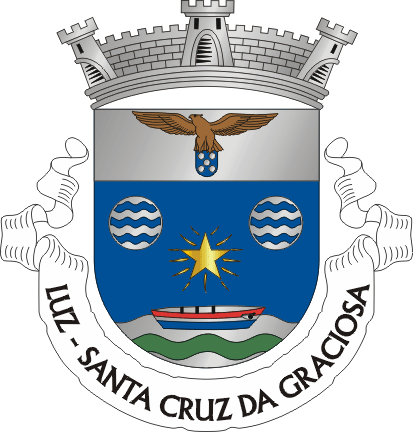
- Coat of arms

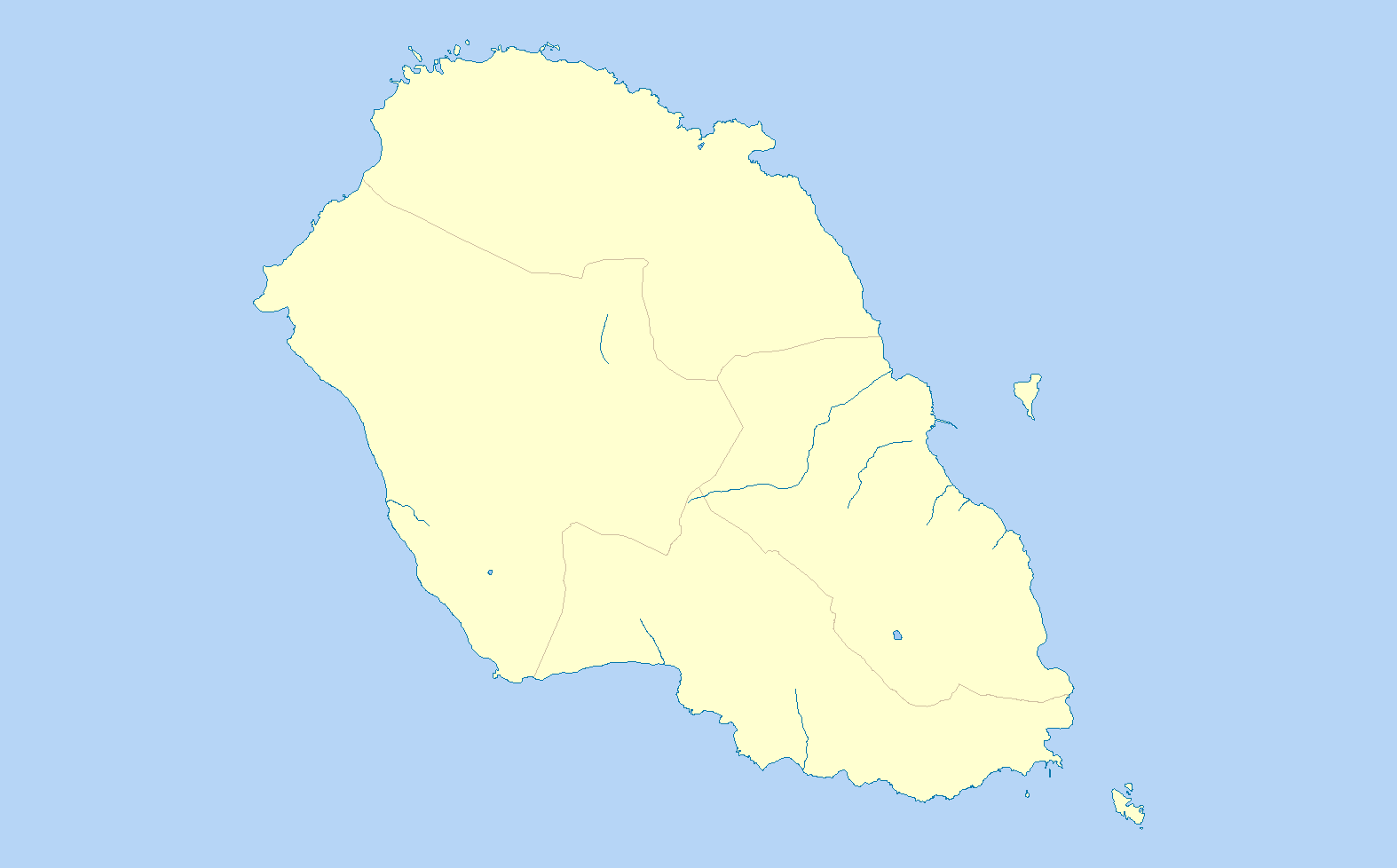
- Location in the Azores Luz (Graciosa)
- Coordinates: 39°1′18″N 27°59′23″W
- Country: Portugal
- Auton. region: Azores
- Island: Graciosa
- Municipality: Santa Cruz da Graciosa
- Established: Parish: c.1601 Civil parish: c.1867

Area
  - Total: 11.70 km^{2} (4.52 sq mi)
- Elevation: 88 m (289 ft)

Population (2011)
  - Total: 683
  - Density: 58.4/km^{2} (151/sq mi)
- Time zone: UTC−01:00 (AZOT)
  - Summer (DST): UTC+00:00 (AZOST)
- Postal code: 9880-154
- Area code: 292
- Patron: Nossa Senhora de Luz
- Website: jfluz.pt/site/

Luz is a civil parish in the municipality of Santa Cruz da Graciosa on the island of Graciosa in the Portuguese Azores. The population in 2011 was 683, in an area of 11.70 km^{2}. It contains the localities Alto do Sul, Fajã da Folga, Folga, Carapacho, Luz and Pedras Brancas.
