= Santa Cruz da Graciosa =

- Municipality
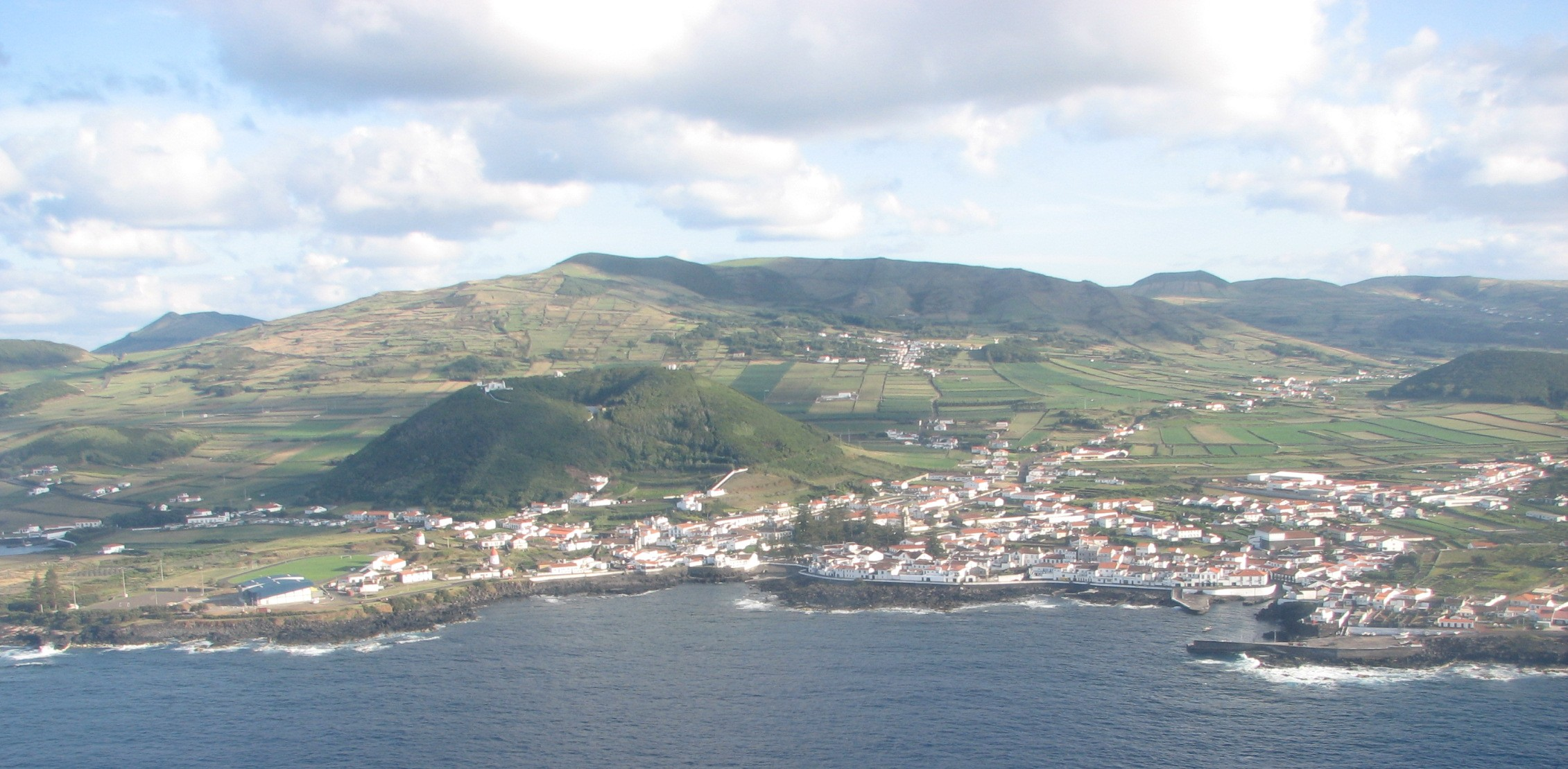
- The municipal seat of Santa Cruz da Graciosa, as seen from off the northeast coast of the island of Graciosa

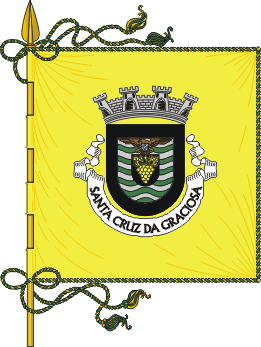
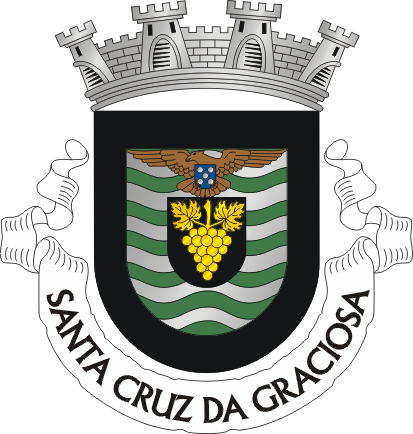
- Flag Coat of arms
- Interactive map of Santa Cruz da Graciosa
- Coordinates: 39°3′17″N 28°0′51″W
- Country: Portugal
- Auton. region: Azores
- Island: Graciosa
- Established: Settlement: c.1475 Municipality: c.1832
- Parishes: 4

Government
  - President: António Reis

Area
  - Total: 60.66 km^{2} (23.42 sq mi)
- Elevation: 140 m (460 ft)

Population (2011)
  - Total: 4,391
  - Density: 72.39/km^{2} (187.5/sq mi)
- Time zone: UTC−01:00 (AZOT)
  - Summer (DST): UTC+00:00 (AZOST)
- Postal code: 9880-352
- Area code: 292
- Local holiday: 2nd Monday in August
- Website: http://cm-graciosa.azoresdigital.pt/

Santa Cruz da Graciosa (Portuguese pronunciation: [ˈsɐ̃tɐ ˈkɾuʒ ðɐ ɣɾɐsiˈɔzɐ]) is a Portuguese municipality on the volcanic island of Graciosa, in the archipelago of the Azores. The population in 2011 was 4,391, in an area of 60.66 km^{2}. It includes four local parishes and one municipal government structure, which administers the entire island.

== History ==
While the date of its first discovery is uncertain, it is known that its first settlers arrived from the island of Terceira around 1450. One of the first settlers was Vasco Gil Sodre.

The island's volcanic soil is rich and supports cultivation of fruits, grains and grapes used in winemaking. The early settlement was primarily agrarian, but by 1486 its population had grown sufficiently to warrant the founding of the vila (or town) of Santa Cruz in 1486, while Praia lost this role.

Between the 16th-17th century, Graciosa was regularly attacked by pirates and privateers, which obliged the local government to construct fortifications along the island's coast for defense.

Over the centuries Santa Cruz was visited by important travellers. The Jesuit António Vieira, who stopped in the village after a shipwreck while returning to Lisbon from Brazil. Later the French writer Chateaubriand, in 1791, whilst fleeing the horrors of the French Revolution stopped in Graciosa en route to America. In 1814, a young Almeida Garret wrote some of his first verses, already a revelation of his budding talents. Finally, in 1879, Prince Albert of Monaco, notable for his oceanographic and maritime studies, stopped in Graciosa and visited Furna do Enxofre. He was one of the first to descend the volcanic chamber using a rope ladder.

The construction of the port in Praia, and the northern aerodrome, were important in breaking the island's isolation and concentration on agriculture.

== Geography ==
=== Human geography ===
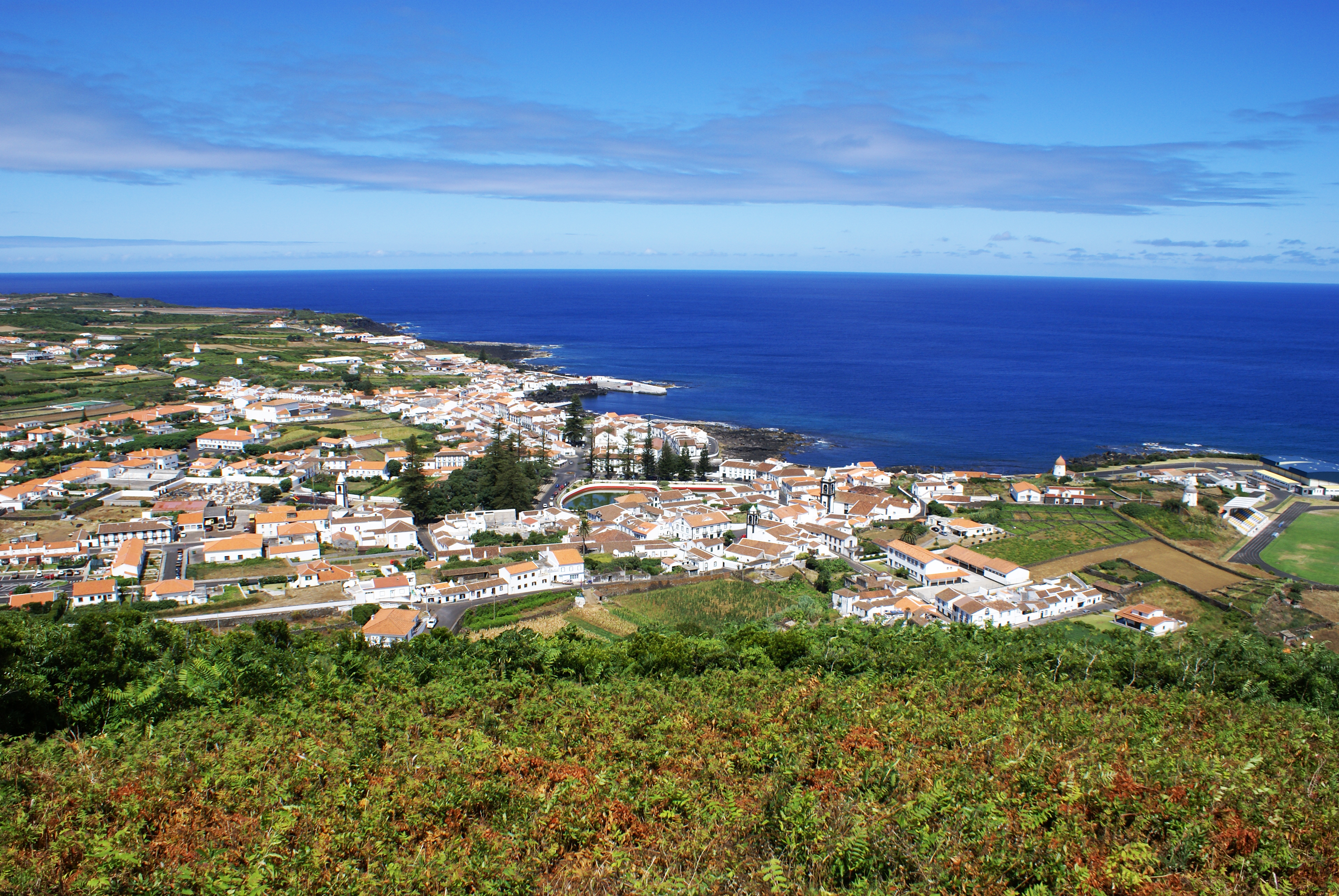
Santa Cruz da Graciosa, is the largest urbanized settlement on the island of Graciosa, Azores

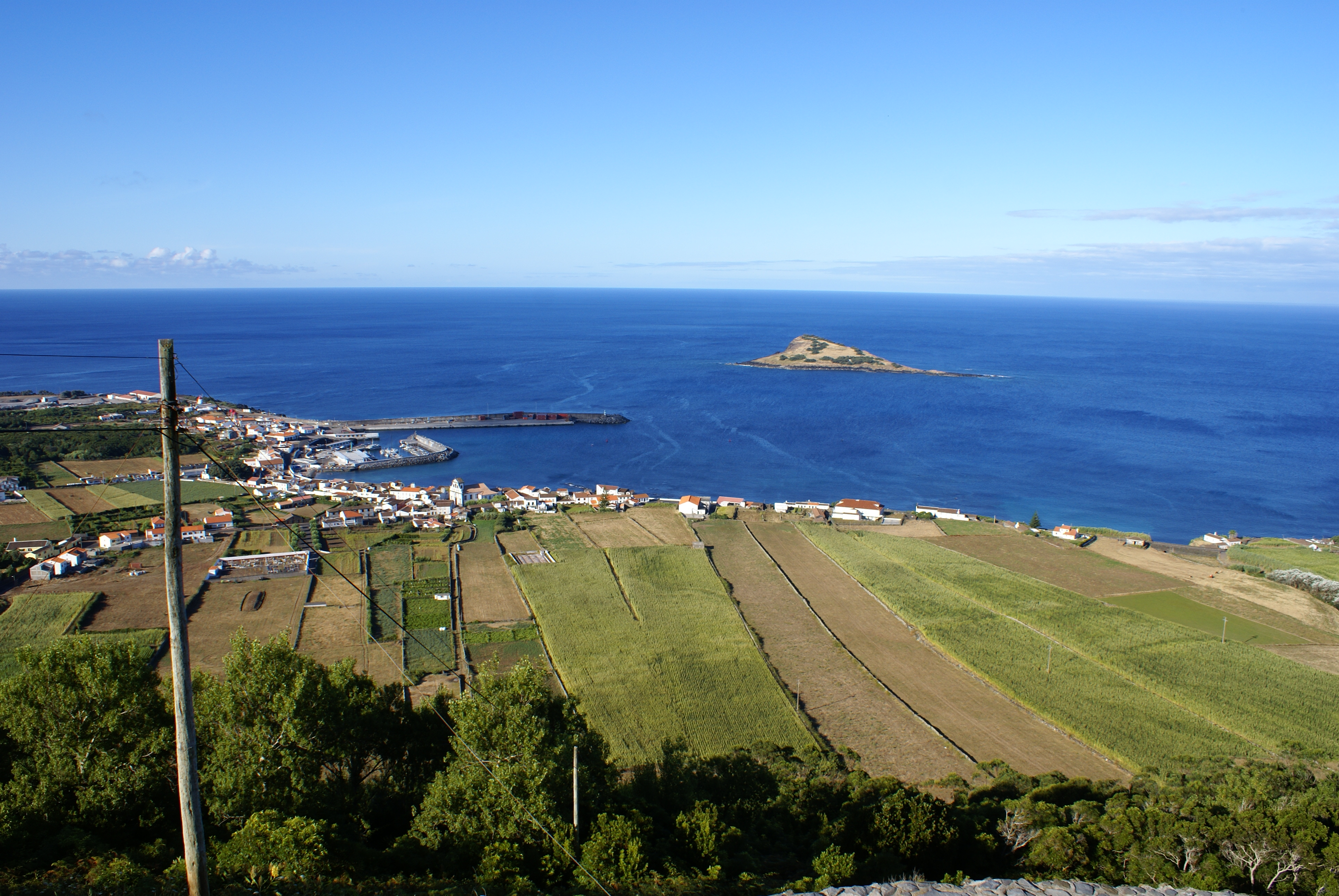
A partial glimpse of the civil parish of Praia on the southern coast of Graciosa

The territory of Graciosa Island consists of one municipality, Santa Cruz da Graciosa (4,780 inhabitants in 2001), which is divided into four civil parishes:

- Santa Cruz - the seat of the municipality and principal urbanized population on the island, located on eastern coast;
- São Mateus da Praia - a historic village and once-municipal seat, until it was unincorporated in the 19th century;
- Guadalupe - the principal rural population on the island;
- Luz - civil parish better known locally as "Sul" (South), located along the southern coast of the island.

The population centers on the island, apart from appearing dispersed, are concentrated along the road network. This is typical of many of other Azorean islands, usually colonized along important corridors corresponding to river-valleys or open terrains. Consequently, urban development has been conditioned by the islands geomorphology resulting in four principal axes of settlement supporting 80% of the islands population:

- along the valley separating the Caldeira Massif from the rest of the island, between the village of Praia and Carapacho, Fonte do Mato, Pedras Brancas and Luz;
- around Serra das Fontes, the axis between Santa Cruz and Santo Amaro, including Fontes and Guadelope, as well as two branches to Pontal by way of Pedras Brancas, and southeast to include Almas, Manuel Gaspar, Ribeirinha and Brasileira;
- from Santa Cruz to Rebentão, around Pico da Hortelã, and northeast to Vitória;
- from Dores to Bom Jesus and along the coast to Vitória, this region is a vast landscape of many disperse settlements, different from the rest of the island.
