= José de Almeida de Ávila =

Civil Governor of the Horta District
- In office 4 January 1894 – 13 July 1895
- Monarch: Carlos I of Portugal
- Prime Minister: Ernesto Rudolfo Hintze Ribeiro
- Preceded by: António Emílio Severino de Avelar
- Succeeded by: Diogo de Barcelos Machado Bettencourt
- Constituency: District of Horta

Personal details
- Born: October 28, 1844 Horta (Azores), Portugal
- Died: October 30, 1902 (aged 58) Lisbon, Portugal
- Citizenship: Portuguese
- Party: Regenerators

José de Almeida de Ávila (Horta, 28 October 1844 — Lisbon, 30 October 1902) was an official in the Portuguese Marines, obtaining the post of Captain, colonial administrator, Governor of Quelimane and Lourenço Marques, as well as the Civil Governor of the district of Horta (between 1894 and 1895).

== Early life ==
Born on the island of Faial, he was the brother of the second Marquess of Ávila e Bolama, and nephew of the first Duke of Ávila e Bolama.

== Career ==
For a time José de Ávila was commander of the port of the district capital.

=== Civil Governor ===
At the time of his installation as Civil Governor of the district of Horta, a commentary in the local daily O Fayalense, proclaimed: "[that they waited] animatedly for the new authority, with the same sentiments that your dignified brother, the Count of Ávila manifests for the land of his place of birth, that you will make all efforts to obtain a few improvements of the more instant necessities that the district lacks." Further, the "illustration and firmness of character of Sr. Councillor Ávila inspires us with the most confidence in the good performance of the important position that certainly you were confided."

Councilor José de Ávila was named Civil Governor of the District of Horta on 4 January 1894. This was a period of political turmoil, wherein José de Avila was involved in deliberations for the construction of new lighthouses in the archipelago of the Azores, and in particular projects for Faial and Flores (in his district). José de Almeida had suggested a plan that was "merely practical and economic for the illumination of the Azores". Knowing that the plan by the Lighthouse Commission was considerably expensive and complete, he advanced a plan to situate six lighthouses and eight smaller beacons in all the islands, indicating the locations, characteristics, angle of influence, estimated costs and calendarization for the project. He was reasonably confident that "the Azores would be conveniently illuminated, providing the Country a marked service for navigators, to the Azorean group and humanity in general." By 1876, only the lighthouse at Ponta do Arnel existed (on the island of São Miguel). As the nobleman promoted, "it is a shame and almost a crime" and that "every member of the Chamber of dignified Peers of the Kingdom and the gentlemen deputies of the nation that support...that we consign in the general budget funds to purchase a second-order lighthouse for the Azorean archipelago, and that we begin hereon-in work to install on them on the farthest western points of the island of Flores and island of Faial."

During his term, Ávila was responsible for several projects on the island. These included initial construction of the lighthouses at Capelinhos and Lajes das Flores; the study completed for the supply of water to the city of Horta; an important donation of funds to Cedros, for the construction of a new roadway and repairs to the parochial church; improvements to the ports destroyed by a cyclone on Pico (especially in Lajes and Ribeiras), the coastal road between São João and Silveira, and schools of Ribeirinha and Silveira; also on the island of Flores, in addition to the lighthouse, there was a budgetary increase of funds to construct a roadway between Lajes and Ribeira da Urzela. During the course of its construction, Ávila also had installed a telegraph at Capelinhos, which would become important by the mid-20th century, during the volcanic eruption.

Linked to the Regenerators, he ceased his role as first magistrate in the district on 13 July 1895, difficult-ed by his contemporaries, and specifically the Progressives. There obstructionism was publicly denounced by two extensive opinion articles, that were inserted on the 27 January and 10 February 1895, and mysteriously signed by an enigmatic "S". In the letter, "S" stated the opinion that "the politicians of this disgraceful island, ever ungrateful, for an illustrious Faialense family."
