= Lighthouse of Ponta dos Capelinhos =

Lighthouse in Portugal

Lighthouse of Ponta dos Capelinhos Farol dos Capelinhos
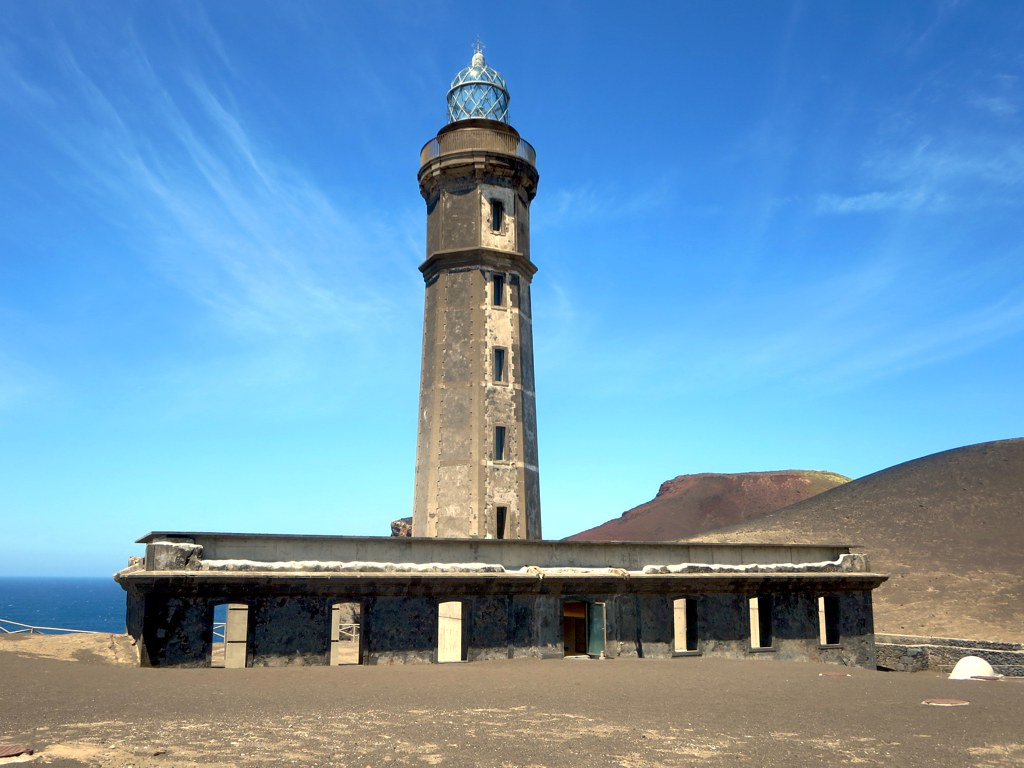
- The iconic lighthouse at the tip of Ponta dos Capelinhos and Costa Nau
- Location: Capelo; Horta; Faial; Azores; Portugal
- Coordinates: 38°35′48.45″N 28°49′34.04″W

Tower
- Constructed: 1894
- Construction: stone tower
- Height: 20 metres (66 ft)
- Shape: octagonal tower with balcony and lantern rising from a 2-story keeper's house
- Markings: unpainted tower
- Operator: Centro de Interpretação do Vulcão dos Capelinhos
- Heritage: heritage without legal protection

Light
- First lit: 1903
- Deactivated: 1957 (due to volcano eruption)
- Focal height: 70 metres (230 ft)
- Lens: 500 mm Focal Distance
- Intensity: 1000 W
- Characteristic: Fl W 7 s

The Lighthouse of Ponta dos Capelinhos (Portuguese: Farol da Ponta dos Capelinhos, [fɐˈɾoɫ ðɐ põtɐ ðus kɐpɨˈlĩɲuʃ]), or alternately Lighthouse of Capelinhos (Portuguese: Farol dos Capelinhos, [fɐˈɾoɫ ðus kɐpɨˈlĩɲuʃ]), is a former beacon/lighthouse located along the coastal peninsula of Ponta dos Capelinhos and Costa Nau, in the civil parish of Capelo, on the island of Faial in the Portuguese archipelago of the Azores. Constructed in the late 19th century, it is an iconic symbol on the island, for the eruption of Capelinhos volcano, which occurred in 1957–58.

== History ==
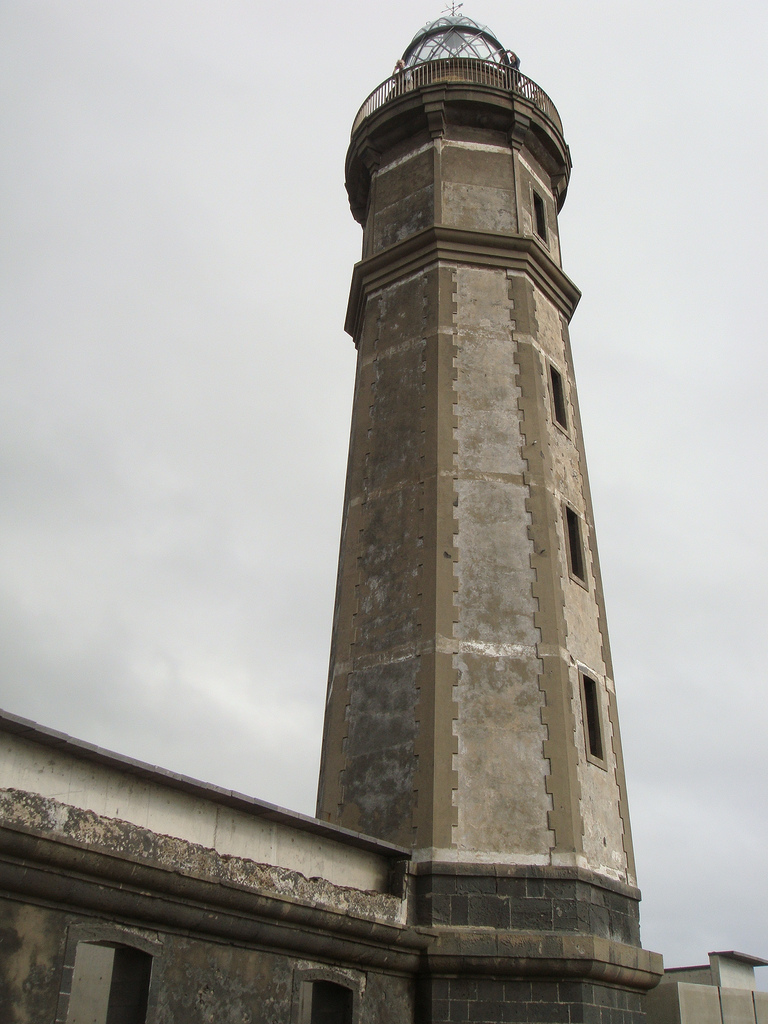
The main tower of the lighthouse constructed in volcanic basalt

Work on the lighthouse began on 18 April 1894, but for many years the necessity of constructing a beacon on the tip of Faial had been advocated by navigators, officials and public opinion, who: " complained to the Government that some lights were need along the islands coast to indicate to navigation that crossed these waters their proximity to land, the loss that [might] occur or the choices to make." The number of incidents in this region reached a grande scale by the end of the 19th century, with more traffic, but records went as far back as 1678.

In the second half of the 19th century, more specifically 1883 and 1884, presentations had been made the Faialense Sociedade de Geografia (Geographic Society of Portugal) and Municipal Council, presided by João José da Graça, to establish two lighthouses on the island (at Capelinhos and Ribeirinha). Still within this decade, Progressive deputy Miguel António da Silveira received authorization that the construction of the first of these lighthouses would be undertaken, but there were no promises or timelines.

What is certain, is that a Lighthouse Commission (Portuguese: Comissão de Faróis) did study the elaboration of an "illumination plan" for the archipelago. But, this commission had gotten bogged-down in the issues of budget, changes in government and lack of political will. In the local newspaper, opinions from the Portuguese marines, José de Almeida de Ávila (brother of the Count of Ávila) and Domingos Tasso de Figuerido were bantered about. These considerations, along with the Lighthouse Commission proposal were presented in May 1892 to the Ministry of Public Works (Portuguese: Ministério das Obras Públicas), and a decision to invest 15 contos de reis was released in April 1894. Elections, on 29 April of the same year, saw Progressive candidates attack the Regenerator plans of José de Almeida de Ávila, stating that "shortly the fiasco of the works on the lighthouse of Capelinhos. After starting the election on 29th day, summer quickly ends the work." Although government candidates were defeated (and José de Almeida de Ávila was forced to resign) the work continued, and the lighthouse eventually inaugurated on 1 August 1903.

The work necessary to begin constructing a lighthouse began on 1 April 1894.

By July 1903 the edifice was in a state of completion.

=== Capelinhos ===
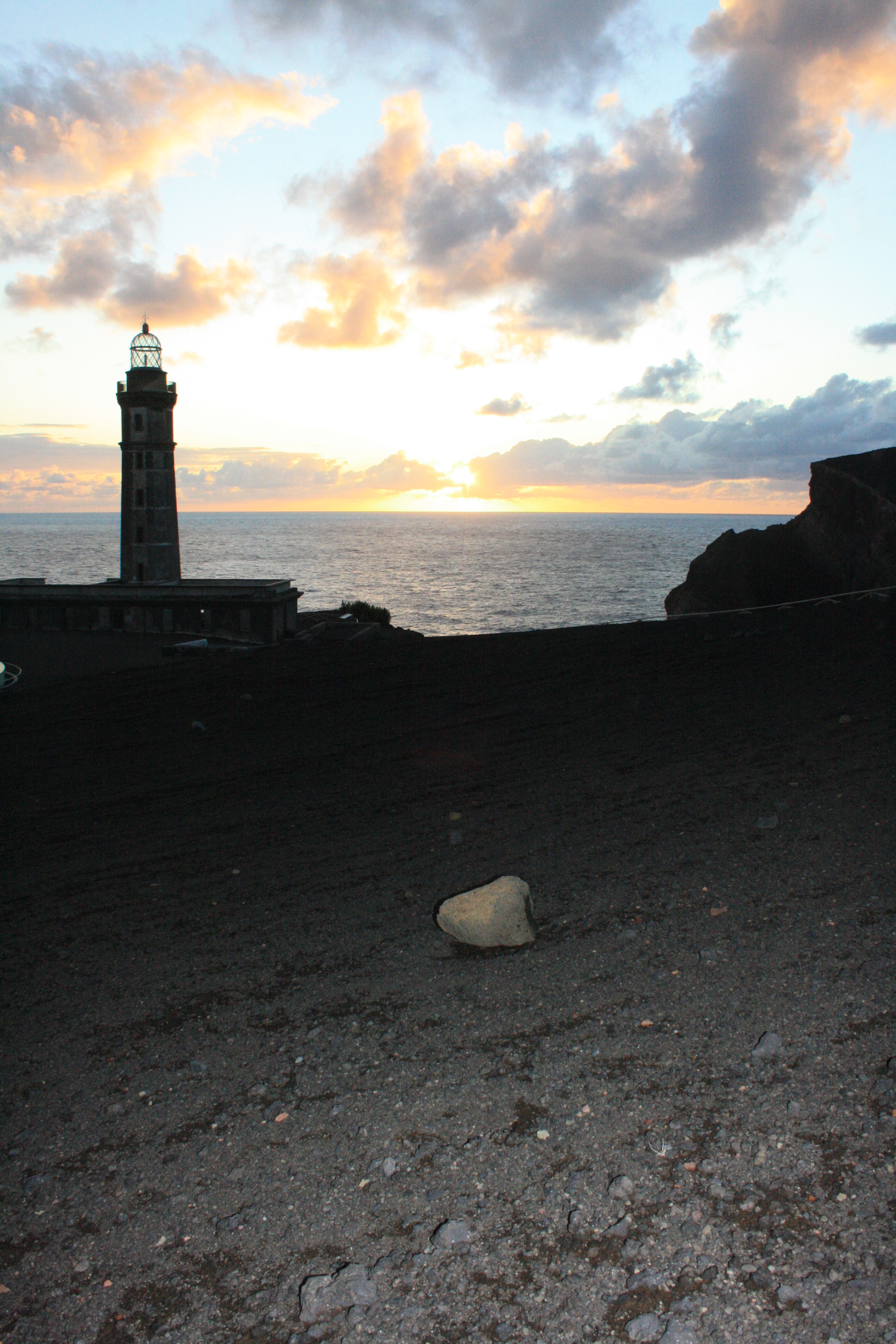
Between 1957 and 1958 a volcanic eruption caused the abandon of the lighthouse and the destruction of surrounding buildings

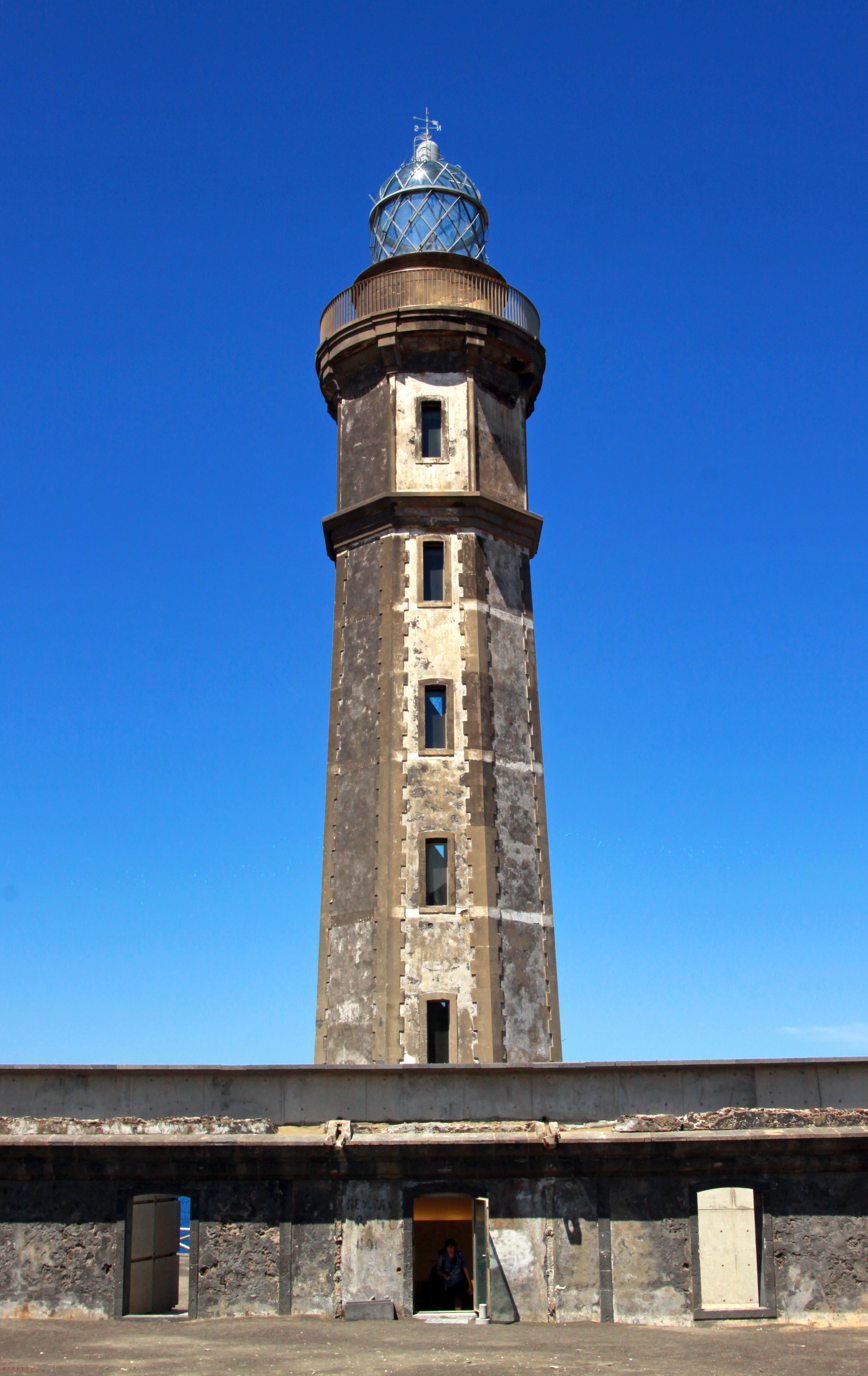
The main building and tower were buried by ash and rock to the point that today only the second-floor is visible above ground

On 10 October 1957, during a period of repairs by the Directorate for Public Works (Portuguese: Direcção das Obras Públicas), for the district of Horta, under the supervision of the Direcção-Geral dos Edifícios e Monumentos Nacionais (DGEMN) and Direcção dos Serviços de Conservação (Portuguese: Directorate for Conservation Services), the director of the Directorate informed by telegraph the suspension of activities due to the eruption of the Capelinhos volcano.

The first report by directing engineer of Public Works (Frederico de Menezes Avelino Machado) occurred on 7 November 1957, to the director of the DGEMN, over the impact of the eruption on the lighthouse. Included in the report was a unique moment in the contemporary history of the archipelago:

"The eruption at Capelinhos started on 27 September with a small boiling of water at sea some 1 kilometre (0.62 mi) west of the lighthouse. On 29 September, the intensity increased and became highly explosive. The ejecti of ash (sand and powder) reached frequently 800 metres (2,600 ft) and another time reached more than 1,200 metres (3,900 ft). The column of water vapor reached 3 or 4 kilometres (1.9 or 2.5 mi) in height and exceptionally even more. The violence of the eruption continued for a month. The quantity of ash emitted was so great that it formed a small island with 800 metres (2,600 ft) diameter and 100 metres (330 ft) height (above sea level) in an area that where the profundity was 70 metres (230 ft). There fell, near the lighthouse of Capelinhos and Port of Comprido, a few rocks that were about 30 kilograms (66 lb). The cloud was blown by the wind and because of that ash fell some 20 kilometres (12 mi) from the volcanic chimney. This was the aspect more harmful of the eruption. The quantity of ash fell on land dependent on the direction of the wind. When the wind blew strong from the west, on the 6 and 7 October, there was a panic in the settlements of Canto and Norte Pequeno ([civil] parish of Capelo) which lie about 3 kilometres (1.9 mi) from the volcano. The populations were evacuated. In virtue of the dust scattered in the air (which increased greatly the condensation of the water droplets) the rainfall in the region increased by more the twice the normal, passing from 70 millimetres (2.8 in) to more than 700 millimetres (28 in) per month. The torrential rainfall that fell was another disastrous factor in the region. On 29 October the small island became submerged and it appeared that the activity had terminated. But within the following days it continued, it is unclear whether the activity will return and attain the anterior violence...The rocks expelled by the volcano fell on the buildings of the lighthouse of Capelinhos, puncturing the tile and pavements and breaking glass, sanitary wares and some furniture. The lighthouse had to be closed during the eruption and the personnel evacuated. The work that was in course was, therefore, suspended. The ash and rainfall seaped into the holes in the roof and windows and accumulated in almost all the rooms, damaging the interior floors and paintings. The exterior courtyard was, also, littered with more than 1 metre (3.3 ft) of sand." This description was also accompanied by a photographic journal with regists, captions and dated, to illustrate the more important moments of the event between September and November 1957.

Owing to the eruption of the Capelinhos volcano the lighthouse ceased to operate on 29 November 1957.

On 30 April 1958, a new report by Frederico de Menezes Avelino Machado, accompanied by seven photographic entries, in which he described what had occurred since the last report:

"Since the volcanic activity decreased in November and December, the main breakdowns [onsite] were repaired by the Directorate for Lighthouses and in part by the Direcção-Geral dos Edifícios e Monumentos Nacionais, who executed emergency repairs to the tune of 49.611$50 [Portuguese escudo|escudos] to the buildings in order to resist the inclement weather caused by the eruption that persisted for months. In January ashed fell again and (from the Direcção de Obras Públicas) funds were realized (20 contos) to maintain the roofs clean, of which 11.109$00 were spent...In February and March, the eruption had an unexpected development. The crater, that was about 1,200 kilometres (750 mi) from the lighthouse, do farol) shifted to a point 500 metres (1,600 ft) closer, the consequence of the rocks, with weights of between 10–300 kilograms (22–661 lb), and which fell in great abundance, that the roof cleaning work was quickly suspended. Many the rocks damaged the buildings, piercing the fibrocement roof. Ash also fell in great abundance...In one night (23–24 March) a 1.9 metres (6.2 ft) layer of ash fell, corresponding to a load of 2,000 kilograms per cubic metre (120 lb/cu ft). The roofs of the residences fell in and the reinforced concrete slab in the machine building was ruined. There is actually in the lighthouse courtyard ash with a layer of 7 metres (23 ft) approximately and this number continues to increase. It was possible with funds received to remove furniture and machinery (work that was completed by personnel from the lighthouse)...In wake of what has occurred, it appears that no further funds should be spent on the lighthouse until the eruption ends. The tower still maintains itself in reasonable conditions, but the volcanic cone, [now] actually 150 metres (490 ft) is increasing a lot, that maybe we will need to review the future location of the lightouse."

== See also ==
- List of lighthouses in Portugal
