= Capelo =

- Civil parish
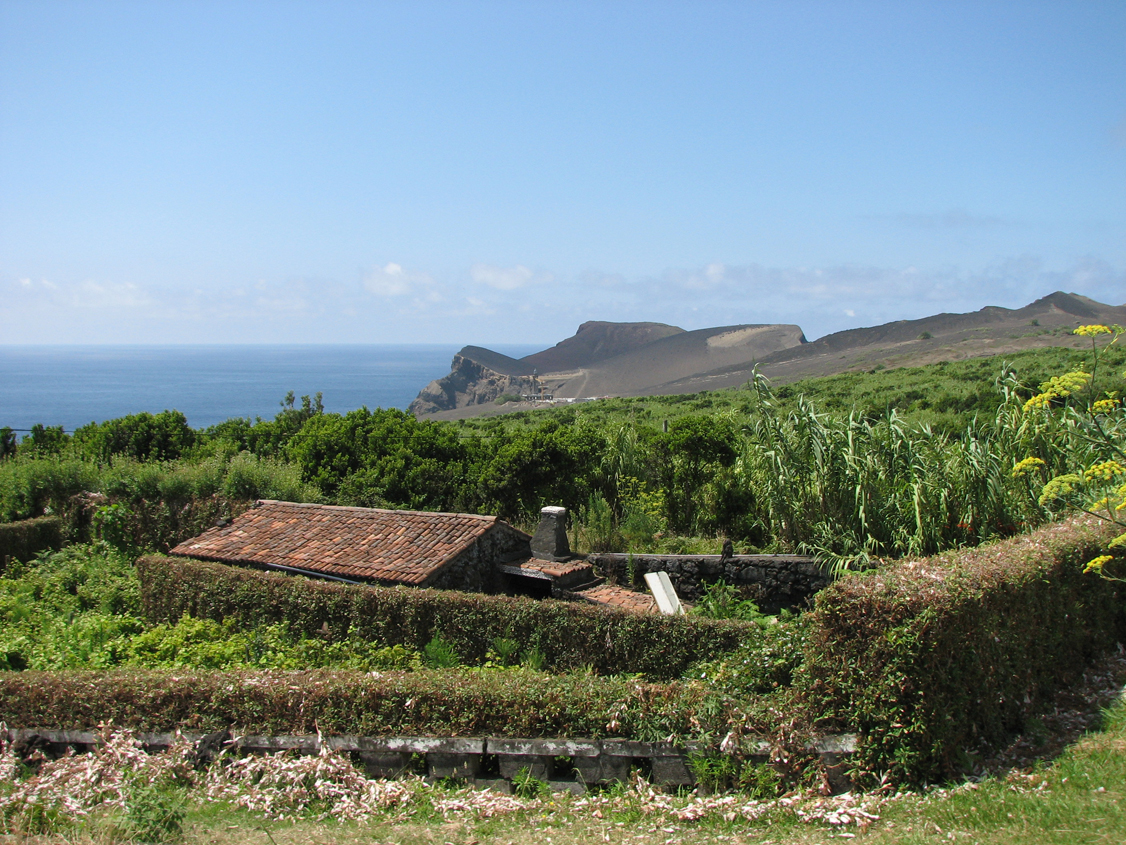
- The western landscape of Capelo, showing the Capelinhos Volcano, as it appeared (c.1990)

- Location of the civil parish of Capelo within the municipality of Horta
- Coordinates: 38°35′8″N 28°47′52″W
- Country: Portugal
- Auton. region: Azores
- Island: Faial
- Municipality: Horta
- Established: Settlement: fl. 1550; Civil parish: c. 1600

Area
  - Total: 26.64 km^{2} (10.29 sq mi)
- Elevation: 263 m (863 ft)

Population (2011)
  - Total: 486
  - Density: 18.2/km^{2} (47.2/sq mi)
- Time zone: UTC−01:00 (AZOT)
  - Summer (DST): UTC+00:00 (AZOST)
- Postal code: 9900-302
- Area code: 292
- Patron: Santíssima Trindade

Capelo (pronounced [kɐ.ˈpe.ɫu]) is a freguesia ("civil parish") in the municipality of Horta on the island of Faial in the Azorean archipelago. The population in 2011 was 486, in an area of 26.64 km^{2}. Capelo may be considered the westernmost settlement of Eurasia, if Fajã Grande, on Flores Island, is considered part of North America, for it sits on the North American Plate.

== History ==
The village was elevated to civil parish in 1600, when it was de-annexed from the neighbouring parish of Praia do Norte. Friar Diogo das Chagas, in 1643, noted that the parish had about 160 inhabitants, and approximately 44 residences. At its largest, the population reached 1,400 inhabitants.

The town was practically destroyed in 1672 and 1673 during the volcanic eruption of Cabeço de Fogo (the name of the central volcano on the island of Faial). During this eruption, volcanic ash and pyroclastic projectiles rained down on the community, destroying homes and sterilizing agricultural lands in Capelo and Praia do Norte. Ironically, between 1673 and 1845, Praia do Norte was integrated into the civil parish of Capelo.

The Church of the Santissima Trinidade (Church of the Holy Trinity) in Capelo, was ordered constructed by the Captain-major, Jorge Goulart Pimental, to replace the parochial church, the Chapel of Nossa Senhora da Esperança (Our Lady of Hope), which was destroyed during the 1672 volcanic eruption. A chapel to Nossa Senhora da Esperança was later constructed near the old church (which has since disappeared from the landscape).

The chapel of Varadouro was founded in 1720, by Father Manuel Pereira Cardoso, to the invocation of Nossa Senhora do Carmo (Our Lady of Mount Carmel). Later, in his 1725 last testament, Father Cardoso requested that his inheritors celebrate a mass in perpetuity to the name Nossa Senhora do Carmo, the Holy Sacrament, and Santo António, on every first Sunday of October. The spa at Varadouro was constructed and inaugurated on 1 August 1954 by architect Read Teixeira.

== Geography ==
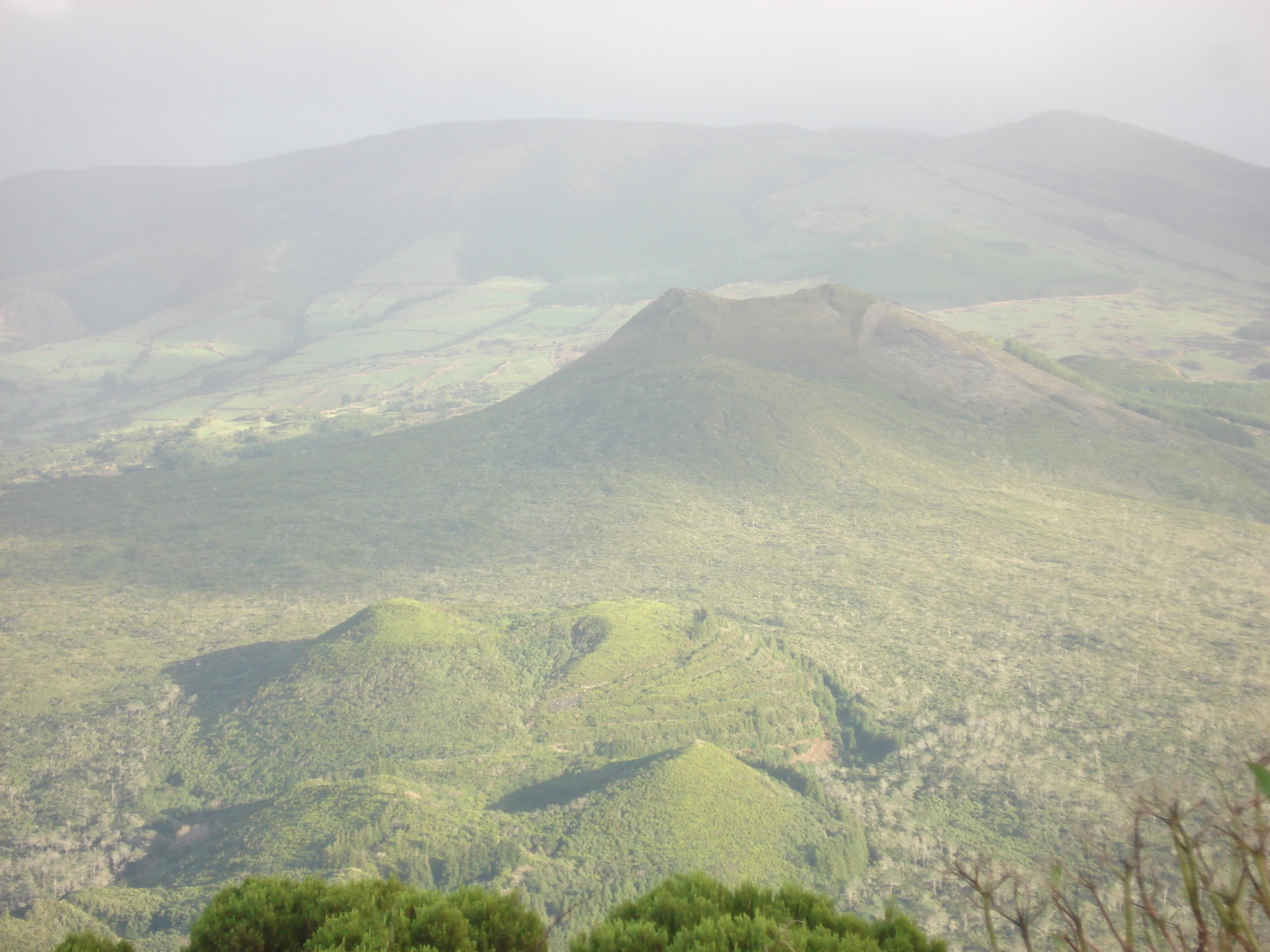
Cone alignment along the western flank of the Caldeira stratovolcano in Capelo

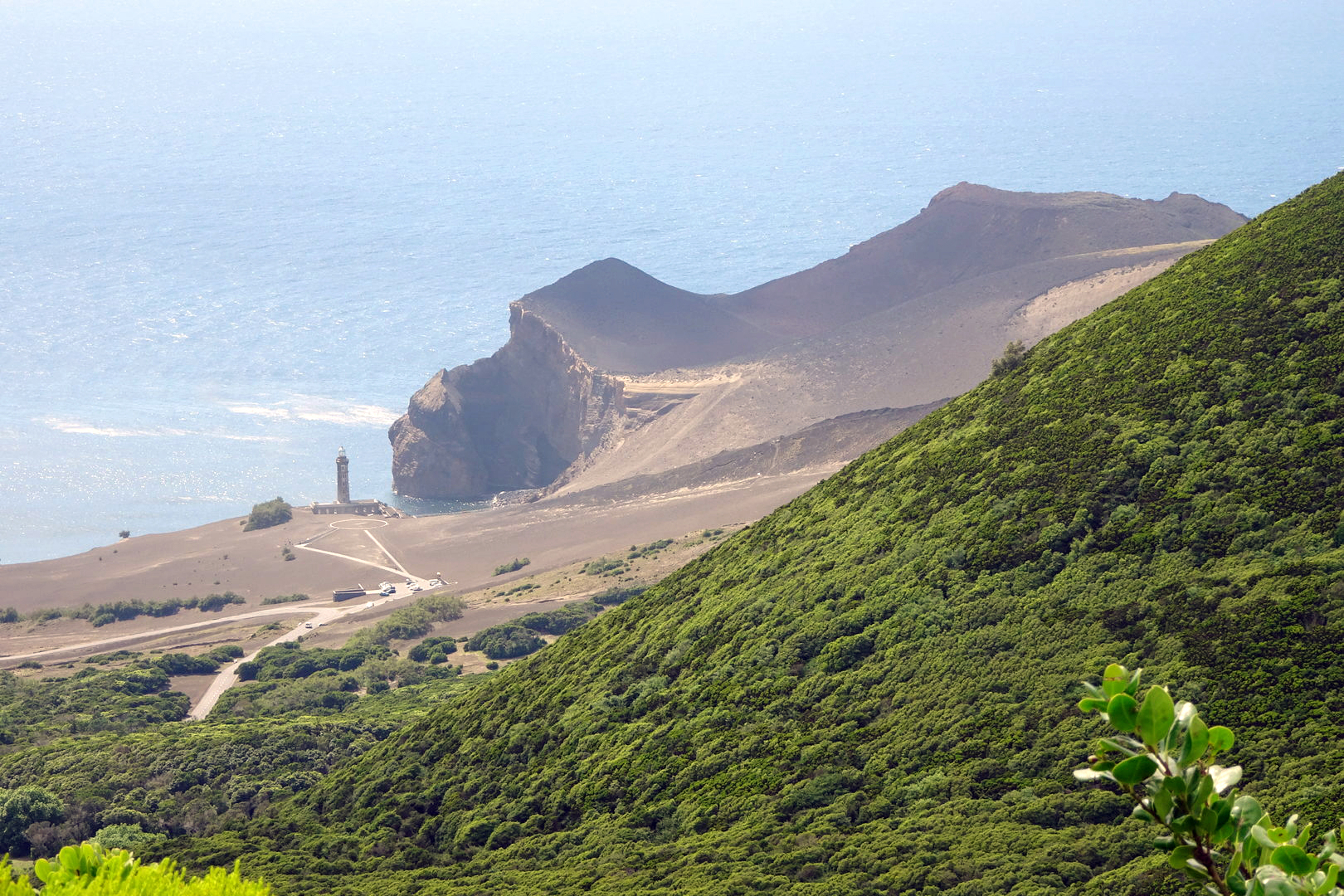
The Capelinhos volcano, at the western tip of Capelo: the last terrestrial eruption in the Azores occurred in 1957-58 from this cone

=== Physical geography ===
Mountainous volcanic craters cover the majority of the parish (being the location of the most recent volcanic eruption in the Azores). The parish has several facets: an area of volcanic craters that extends from the islands caldera, inland pasturelands used to support the agricultural/dairy industry, and a coastal zone of cottages and oceanfront pools. Linking these areas is the ubiquitous Regional Road E.R. 1-1ª that connects the communities on the island with Horta in the southeast corner.

The parish is located on layers of volcanic materials referred to as the Capelo Volcanic Complex. It is a line of volcanic escoria cones of fissural nature lying on a west-northwest-east-southeast orientation consisting of basaltic volcanism of low explosivity. The peninsula shows varying volcanic shapes and products resulting from surtseyan, Hawaiian and strombolian phases of volcanism. It is area of young rock (less than 10.000 years), overlying the older pyroclasts of the Caldeira Formation, and includes two historical eruptions (the 1672 Cabeço do Fogo and 1957 Capelinhos eruptions). This fractural zone is defined by the Capelo Fault, a fracture system of cones and craters displaying right lateral echelon geometry, which extends to Capelinhos volcano in the western tip of Faial. In this particular area, Capelo Fault is expressed by tens of sub-vertical fractures, concentrated in a 250 meter wide zone, cutting through the pyroclastic sequence of a surtseyan cone exposed in a paleo-sea cliff east of Capelinhos volcano. An example of these fractures can be found on the surface of the Capelinhos volcano; a warm vent on its eastern flank belies the active nature of this volcanism.

==== Ecoregions/Protected areas ====
The parish is crossed by several pedestrian hiking trails connecting the volcanic cones along the Capelo Volcanic Complex: Cabeço do Fogo, Cabeço Verde and Cabeço do Canto, as well as interesting geological sites such as Fonte dos Namorados. Capelo is also known for its micro-climate, which has allowed the cultivation of grapes and small wine production. The areas along Canada das Adegas (in Norte Pequeno) and Varadouro are characteristic of these private holdings and "adegas". In addition, two major protected areas fall within the frontiers of the parish:

- Área Protegida para a Gestão de Habitats ou Espécies dos Capelinhos, Costa Noroeste e Varadouro (English: Protected Area of Capelinhos, Northwest Coast and Varadouro) - the protected area encompasses many of the extinct cones of Cabeço Verde, Cabeço da Fonte, Caldeirão, Cabeço do Canto and Caldeirinhas along the Capelo cape until Cabeço do Goularte, flanking of the central caldera. The protected area, designated for the protection of habitats and species includes pre-existing environments and the nascent ecosystems of the volcanic structures of Capelo, as well as the fragile ecoregion created by the Capelinhos eruption;
- Área Protegida de Gestão de Recursos dos Capelinhos, includes primarily the impact area of the Capelinhos eruption that extends from the Estrada Regional E.R.1-1ª to the Costa do Nau coast and Capelinhos volcano. This area, primarily identifiable by the barren moonscape and iconic lighthouse were designated for protection and management, and conserves the post-eruption landscape, interdicting reconstruction of homes lost during the event. In addition to the Costa do Nau, the protected area extends to the coast and ocean territory off the coast, surround the base of the volcano;
- Área Protegida para a Gestão de Habitats ou Espécies Varadouro–Castelo Branco (English: Protected Area of Varadouro-Castelo Branco) - this protected area includes the escarpment face of the southern coast, extending from Varadouro to the Morro de Castelo Branco, which are nesting grounds for migratory and marine bird species;

Further, and also included in the Capelinhos-Nordoeste-Varadouro region is the Parque Florestal do Capelo (English: Forest Park of Capelo), a region that extends from the central Capelos cape to the coast between Biscoitos and Varadouro used as leisure/recreative forest park.

The Geographer Christophe Neff working since 1999 on environmental changes and vegetation dynamics and plant distribution in the different landscapes of the Capelo area, wrote recently in his blog, - that Capelo has considerably changed in the last twenty years, - more tourism, more secondary houses, and more vineyards are now part of the landscape of Capelo. In the same text he remarked, that in 1999 Capelo was a very fare remote area, the End of the world, “Fim do Mundo”, the same name as a bar, that was situated, in Norte Pequeno in the North of Capelo.

=== Climate ===
Capelo has a humid subtropical climate at low altitudes and a wetter oceanic climate at higher altitudes.

Climate data for Capelo, elevation: 196 m (643 ft), 1978-1990
| Month | Jan | Feb | Mar | Apr | May | Jun | Jul | Aug | Sep | Oct | Nov | Dec | Year |
|---|---|---|---|---|---|---|---|---|---|---|---|---|---|
| Record high °C (°F) | 19.9 (67.8) | 19.5 (67.1) | 22.0 (71.6) | 21.5 (70.7) | 23.1 (73.6) | 26.8 (80.2) | 28.3 (82.9) | 28.3 (82.9) | 27.0 (80.6) | 25.0 (77.0) | 22.0 (71.6) | 19.5 (67.1) | 28.3 (82.9) |
| Mean daily maximum °C (°F) | 15.4 (59.7) | 15.1 (59.2) | 15.5 (59.9) | 16.1 (61.0) | 17.8 (64.0) | 20.0 (68.0) | 22.8 (73.0) | 24.0 (75.2) | 23.0 (73.4) | 20.5 (68.9) | 17.7 (63.9) | 16.3 (61.3) | 18.7 (65.6) |
| Daily mean °C (°F) | 13.1 (55.6) | 12.6 (54.7) | 13.0 (55.4) | 13.4 (56.1) | 15.1 (59.2) | 16.9 (62.4) | 19.5 (67.1) | 20.8 (69.4) | 20.1 (68.2) | 17.6 (63.7) | 15.4 (59.7) | 14.1 (57.4) | 16.0 (60.7) |
| Mean daily minimum °C (°F) | 10.8 (51.4) | 10.2 (50.4) | 10.5 (50.9) | 10.7 (51.3) | 12.0 (53.6) | 13.8 (56.8) | 16.2 (61.2) | 17.6 (63.7) | 17.1 (62.8) | 14.8 (58.6) | 12.7 (54.9) | 11.7 (53.1) | 13.2 (55.7) |
| Record low °C (°F) | 5.0 (41.0) | 4.6 (40.3) | 4.1 (39.4) | 4.6 (40.3) | 4.0 (39.2) | 3.2 (37.8) | 8.0 (46.4) | 10.0 (50.0) | 10.4 (50.7) | 6.5 (43.7) | 3.5 (38.3) | 3.2 (37.8) | 3.2 (37.8) |
| Average rainfall mm (inches) | 92.4 (3.64) | 147.5 (5.81) | 85.1 (3.35) | 71.4 (2.81) | 86.6 (3.41) | 76.9 (3.03) | 34.7 (1.37) | 63.3 (2.49) | 95.7 (3.77) | 108.8 (4.28) | 162.8 (6.41) | 150.4 (5.92) | 1,175.6 (46.29) |
| Average relative humidity (%) | 84 | 83 | 83 | 81 | 84 | 84 | 84 | 84 | 83 | 84 | 84 | 84 | 84 |
Source: IPMA

=== Human geography ===
In addition to the village of Capelo, at the intersection of the E.R.1-1ª and E.R.3-2ª, the parish includes the localities of Areeiro, Biscoitos, Canto, Cimo da Ribeira, Cruzeiro, Norte Pequeno, Ribeira do Cabo, Rua do Canto, Rua da Igreja and Varadouro.

== Economy ==
The economy in this region is primarily agriculture-related, with dairy-oriented activities dominating. Meanwhile, owing to the numerous natural monuments in the region (the aforementioned Capelinhos volcano and protected areas), the region regularly sees eco-tourist activities throughout the year, with rural tourism, pedestrian trails and other leisure activities occurring in the areas of Capelo and Varadouro.

The parish's southern coast is considered the "spa region" of the island, dominated by a large bay and the black rock cliffs of Varadouro and the Mouro volcanic plug. Discovered in 1889, the warm waters at Varadouro were considered, at the time, one of the best medicinal treatments in the country for rheumatism and skin diseases; its hypersaline waters whose temperatures average 35.5 °C (95.9 °F), attracted "beachgoers" who travelled to the ocean-carved pools for refreshment during the Gilded Age, while partaking of the thermal waters at the spa.

Since this period, the use of the thermal waters has been intermittent, during phases of proactive local governments; around the late 20th century the buildings were already in ruins. Plans to economically rejuvenate the area were concentrated on reconstructing the buildings, as a way to attract new visitors. But, in November 2007, these small plans were suspended in order to redevelop the site into a Hotel-Spa facility. These plans stagnated until 2009 when, along with INOVA, the regional government proposed a new project to revitalize the thermal-spa potentiality of the Azores (called TERMAZ), which projected the reconstruction of the existing Varadouro spa buildings: a project that was stalled by 2011. Amid opposition declarations requesting a timeline for their reconstruction, by 2011, the Regional Government indicated their intention to expropriate lands necessary to "re-qualify and reactivate" the Thermae of Varadouro (and suggesting that only 10% had not been acquired until this point).

== Architecture ==
=== Civic ===
- Geological Museum of the Volcano (Portuguese: Museu Geologica do Vulcão);
- Handicrafts School of Capelo (Portuguese: Escola de Artesanto do Capelo);
- House of the Washerwomen (Portuguese: Casa das Lavadeiras), recuperated in 2012, located in Fonte das Areias, this public washbasin was used by local women until the end of the 19th century, and was associated with the Dabney family (who had a summer cottage here 1806 and 1892); This washbasin was the first location to provide potable water to the parish of Capelo. Part of the Protected Landscape of the Central Zone (Portuguese: Área de Paisagem Protegida da Zona Central), the structure is included within the Trail of the 10 Volcanoes (Portuguese: Trilho dos 10 Vulcões), which was also improved during the requalification of the areas;
- Lighthouse of Ponta dos Capelinhos (Portuguese: Farol da Ponta dos Capelinhos) and Interpretative Centre of the Capelinhos Volcano (Portuguese: Centro Interpretativo dos Capelinhos), the 19th century lighthouse that took half a century to construct, but was destroyed in less than a year during the Capelinhos volcanic eruption (1957–58);
- Lighthouse of Vale Formoso (Portuguese: Farol de Vale Formoso), a 20th-century modernist lighthouse recognizable for its simplistic lines, comparable to the lighthouse in the Formigas;
- Thermal Spa of Varadouro (Portuguese: Termas do Varadouro)

=== Religious ===
- Church of Nossa Senhora da Esperança (Portuguese: Igreja da Nossa Senhora da Esperança)
- Church of Santissima Trinidade (Portuguese: Igreja Paroquial de Capelo/Igreja da Santíssima Trindade)
- Hermitage of Nossa Senhora do Carmo (Portuguese: Ermida da Nossa Senhora do Carmo)

== Culture ==
=== Festivities ===
In addition to the festivals associated with the Holy Spirit (which occur several weeks following Easter), the parish is the center of the Festas do Varadouro. This religious celebration is associated with the testamente of Father Cardoso who requested his heirs celebrate a mass in his Chapel of Varadouro in the name of Nossa Senhora do Carmo (Our Lady of Carmo). The celebration occurs on the first Sunday in October.

=== Tourism ===
Tourism in this parish is associated primarily with the main sites: Capelinhos and Varadouro. The re-qualification of the primary roadways within the past few years has been a process of improving and developing rural, eco- and geo-tourism. Similarly, with the emphasis on improving tourism in the Varadouro region, the natural rock pools have been improved and thermal spa in planning for remodeling.
