= Diogo de Barcelos Machado Bettencourt =

Portuguese politician and judicial magistrate

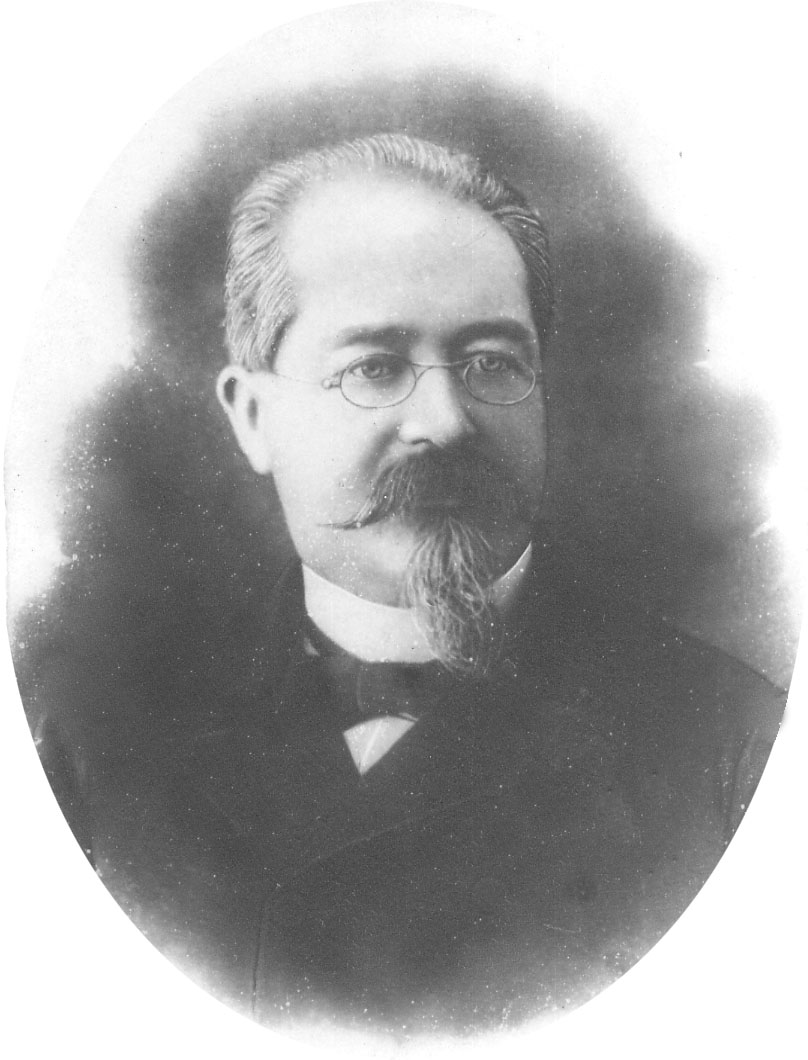

Civil Governor of the Horta District
- In office 1899–1900
- Prime Minister: José Luciano de Castro
- Preceded by: Miguel António da Silveira
- Constituency: District of Horta

Personal details
- Born: 8 August 1847 Angra do Heroísmo (Azores), Kingdom of Portugal
- Died: October 16, 1922 (aged 75) Angra do Heroísmo (Azores), Portuguese Republic
- Citizenship: Portuguese
- Relations: Francisco de Paula de Barcelos Machado de Bettencourt (father); Maria Isabel Barcelos do Canto e Teive de Gusmão (mother)
- Education: University of Coimbra
- Occupation: Judge
- Profession: Judiciary

Diogo de Barcelos Machado Bettencourt (Angra do Heroísmo; 8 August 1847 — Angra do Heroísmo, 16 October 1922) was a politician and judicial magistrate, as well as judge for several districts in the Azores, as well as Civil Governor of Horta.

== Early life ==
He was the son of Francisco de Paula de Barcelos Machado de Bettencourt (born 1825), knight and nobleman in the Royal Household and commander in the Order of Christ, and D. Maria Isabel Barcelos do Canto e Teive de Gusmão (born 19 April 1907).

He obtained a bachelor's degree in law at the University of Coimbra.

== Career ==
He was a representative on the Public Ministry for administrative tribunals of the city of Angra do Heroísmo and Braga, and also along with other judges, a fiscal judge for the city of Funchal, on the island of Madeira.

He was appointed as regional prosecutor for Praia da Vitória, on the island of Terceira.

=== Civil Governor ===
But, between 1899 and 1900, he was appointed Civil Governor of the District of Horta, by decree dated 20 July 1899. Diogo de Barcelos Machado Bettencourt's swearing in (to the Minister of the Interior) was handled on 10 August of that year, but he only arrived in Faial two months later, on 12 October. This delay was caused by an outbreak of Bubonic plague in the city of Porto, during the summer of 1899, resulting in measures that made it difficult to communicate with the Azores. In the case of Horta, the previous governor (José Ferreira Nestor Madruga), had established measures prohibiting contacts with ships coming directly from the Continent. Further, there were also measures by the local District Board of Health, that prevented people from the district from making contact with the contagion. Although these measures caused a degree of discomfort, many of the traders working in the district suffered incalculable losses. Due to these conditions, the new governor only arrived in the district on board a ship from Funchal on 12 October 1899.

His substitute (Miguel António da Silveira), therefore, continued to operate in his capacity since the beginning of the year, until he was forced to cease these activities by the national directory of the Progressistas (Progressive Party). But, even so, it was only on 13 October 1899 that Machado Bettencourt would take-up his functions as Civil Governor.

As a member of the Progressive Party Machado Bettencourt had been selected with the objective of diminishing the constant social agitation. Quickly, in his role, he "tried to appease the Greeks and Troyans", namely "due to the polemic controversy around the plague and sanitary measures", he ordered a week later "the free circulation of all [shipping], except from Porto". The intent of this initiative was more to satisfy the commercial operators who had accumulated debts due to the closed ports, but at the same time he tried to calm the fears of the local populations. Yet, the deaths associated with the plague continued to rise, as many of the local newspapers continued to publish.

To this calamity, the local population was devastated by the 17 October 1899 cyclone, while the political climate was still in full boil, with Progressives debilitated after the resignation of their leader Miguel Silveira. The Progressives, therefore, sought to redo their election hopes against the Regenerator Party, newly strengthened under the chairmanship of Dr. António Emílio Severino de Avelar. The election of 26 November 1899 resulted in a Progressive win, but within the District of Horta the Regenerators were victorious, despite the fact that the district chief used a questionable legal decision to change the beginning of the 1900 date of suffrage. This scandal became wrapped with another incident involving Diogo de Barcelos, associated with the transfer of the buildings of the Liceu Nacional da Horta (National Lyceum of Horta). The lyceum had functioned since 1882 from a large house situated in the Largo do Bispo D. Alexandre, a property owned by Dr. Severino de Avelar, incidentally former rector, a surgeon and, what is more significant, leader of the district Regenerators. What occurred at the end of the December 1899 was purely political, whereby the Progressive Governor, certainly instigated by his party, ordered the school, already teaching since October, to be transferred to a new building on Rua Nova das Angústias, in the extreme south of the city. The local papers criticized this decision, since "the house did not have the minimum conditions for the installation of an institute of this type"; it lacked the number of halls for classes, an office space or library, and was located in Porto Pim, requiring the students to cross the port, the "rail-line where locomotives passed, moving material for the construction of the dock, which would cause disasters". The article ultimately warned locals that such a plan was a preparation for the transfer of students to the Lyceum in Angra (and under the influence of another district). The process was "embarrassing" and "mishandled", and "who have been a case for humour, if it didn't make you cry"; the school remained there until the earthquake of the 31 August 1926, when it was re-installed in the Palacette of the Baron of Ribeirinha. This remained a dark spot on the governorship of Diogo de Barcelos, and likely supported by his political friends in the Progressive party.

The reorganization of the party in the District of Horta was one of the principal tasks given him by Prime Minister José Luciano de Castro. The O Telégrafo writing on 29 March 1900, noted the meeting of many of the Progressives:

"Meeting today at 12:000 in the day, in the hall of the Civil Governor, the local Progressive Party, in order to resolve the selection of the party directory. Presided by the Civil Governor, the party selected to this directory councilmen Miguel António da Silveira, Francisco Leal de Brito, father João Goulart Cardoso, Manuel da Silva Greaves, father José Ferreira da Silva, father José da Rosa Terra, José Garcia Duarte, Dr. Edwiges Goulart Prieto and father Manuel Moniz Madruga. They informed us that 50 people attended the meeting."

It was not long before the Progressives would need to relinquish power to the Regenerators, helmed by Azorean Hintze Ribeiro, and whom formed the government on 25 June 1900. This change, ultimately led to the transfer of Civil Governors, and Diogo de Barcelos accepted his decommission on 26 June 1900.

== Later life ==
He also exercised the position Juiz de Direito on the island of Pico and, later, Graciosa.

He died in the city of Angra on the 16 October 1922.

== Family ==
He married on 23 November 1871, D. Mariana Joaquina da Trindade Ribeiro de Bettencourt, a native of the island of Graciosa, with which he had 18 children:

- João de Bettencourt de Barcelos Machado (Santa Cruz da Graciosa; 14 October 1872 — Angra do Heroísmo; 7 March 1942). Single.
- Francisco de Paula (born 1873).
- Francisco de Paula de Barcelos Machado de Bettencourt, (Santa Cruz da Graciosa; 30 August 1875 — Angra do Heroísmo; 26 June 1943), married to D. Izabel Maria da Cunha e Simas, widow of the Count of Simas.
- D. Maria Helena de Bettencourt de Barcelos, (16 December 1876 — Angra do Heroísmo; 23 May 1916), married João de Castro do Canto de Melo.
- D. Maria (born Angra do Heroísmo; 16 December 1877)
- Diogo, (Angra do Heroísmo; 5 January 1879 — Angra do Heroísmo; 10 March 1880).
- Diogo Tomás de Aquino de Bettencourt de Barcelos (Angra do Heroísmo; 18 May 1880 — 11 April 1918).
- José Maria de Barcelos Machado de Bettencourt (Santa Crua da Graciosa; 27 June 1881 — ?), emigrated to New Bedford, Massachusetts, where he married.
- Manuel Inácio de Bettencourt de Barcelos (Angra do Heroísmo; 4 September 1882 — Angra do Heroísmo; 3 September 1964).
- D. Maria do Carmo, (Angra do Heroísmo; 23 July 1884 — Angra do Heroísmo; 13 October 1884).
- Isidro Barcelos Bettencourt, (Angra do Heroísmo; 15 November 1885 — Angra do heroísmo 1 March 1949), married Maria Delfina Fonseca da Rocha Salgueiro Bettencourt.
- D. Maria, (born Angra do Heroísmo; 21 January 1887 — ?)
- D. Maria da Ascensão de Bettencourt de Barcelos Machado (Angra do Heroísmo; 16 February 1888 — Angra do Heroísmo, 25 July 1966), married João Inácio Diniz de Oliveira.
- D. Maria do Rosário (Angra do Heroísmo; 20 October 1889 — ?).
- D. Maria, (Angra do Heroísmo; 1890 — ?).
- Pedro Mariz Pinheiro de Barcelos, (Angra do Heroísmo; 23 September 1891; — Angra do Heroísmo; 16 September 1911).
- D. Maria, (Angra do Heroísmo; 6 November 1892 — Angra do Heroísmo; 20 November 1892).
- D. Maria de La Salete, (May 1894 — Santa Cruz da Graciosa; 23 July 1894).
