= Praia do Norte =

- Civil parish
- The overlook from Ribeira Funda, with the parish of Praia do Norte, and the coastal community of Fajã

- Location of the civil parish of Praia do Norte within the municipality of Horta
- Coordinates: 38°36′14″N 28°45′32″W
- Country: Portugal
- Auton. region: Azores
- Island: Faial
- Municipality: Horta
- Established: Settlement: fl. 30 June 1567; Parish: fl. 1787; Civil parish: 1 October 1845

Area
  - Total: 13.85 km^{2} (5.35 sq mi)
- Elevation: 191 m (627 ft)

Population (2011)
  - Total: 250
  - Density: 18/km^{2} (47/sq mi)
- Time zone: UTC−01:00 (AZOT)
  - Summer (DST): UTC+00:00 (AZOST)
- Postal code: 9900-473
- Area code: 292
- Patron: Nossa Senhora das Dores
- Website: http://www.jf-praiadonorte.com

Praia do Norte is a civil parish of the municipality of Horta, located along the northern coast between Cedros and Capelo, on the Portuguese island of Faial, in the archipelago of the Azores. The population in 2011 was 250, in an area of 13.85 square kilometres (5.35 mi^{2}). It is the least populous parish on the island, reached along the Estrada Regional E.R.1-1ª regional roadway from the urban centre of Horta. It contains the localities Cerca, Fajã and Praia do Norte.

== History ==
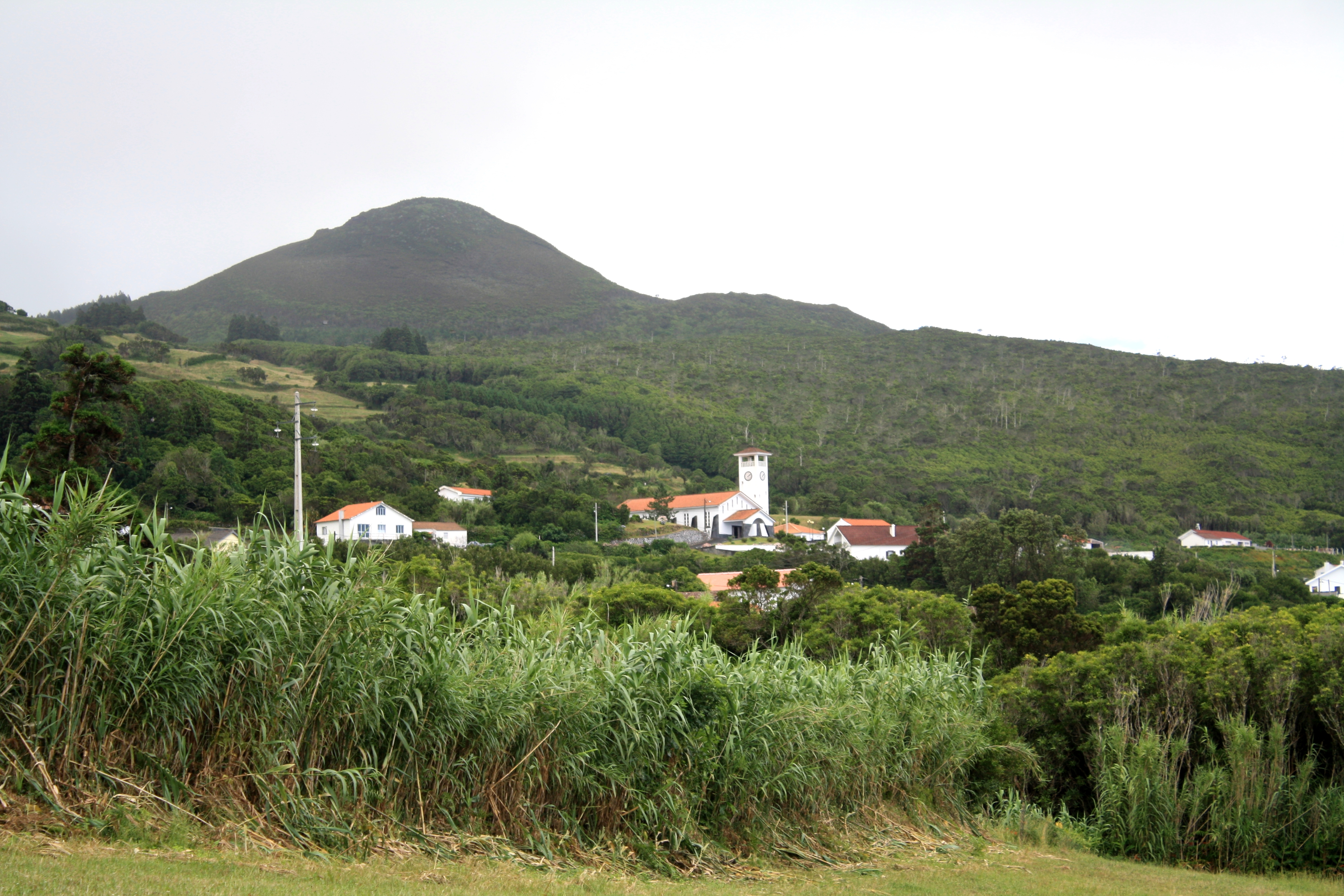
A view of the parochial church under the green cone of Cabeço do Fogo, that destroyed many homes in 1672

This parish, and its church, were first referenced on 30 June 1567, with the first five parishes of the municipality of Horta. Its fertile soils (which produced many of the islands cereals, beans and fruits) were situated in the area known as Nicho, a biforkation between the regional roadway and Norte Pequeno, that stretched to the road at Quinta. By 1643, there were 274 inhabitants and 77 homes in the area (as referenced by Diogo das Chagas). The parish at one time included the region of Capelo, but it was de-annexed.

The primitive parochial church was destroyed completely by the eruption of the Cabeço do Fogo volcano on 24 April 1672. At about one in the morning, a violent explosion awoke many of the residents, and forced them from their homes. Two lava flows escaped Cabeço do Fogo towards the north (Praia do Norte) and south (destroying the community of Ribeira do Cabo in Capelo). The northern flow, after pausing to destroy Lameiros, reached Praia do Norte where it covered the parish in black rock, including many of the large tracts of arable land. Many of the residents of the northern coast abandoned the area, eventually resulting in the parish being incorporated into the neighboring parish (Capelo). According to Américo Costa (in Dicionário Corográfico) a large part of the inhabitants of both parishes (Capelo and Praia do Norte) were affected by the eruption; homes and farmlands in Ribeira do Cabo (Capelo), Lameiros and Praia do Norte were destroyed. A niche, located at the intersection to Norte Pequeno, currently marks the position of the old church. Some inhabitants returned gradually, planting vineyards and fruit trees and small agricultural farming developed on the higher elevations.

By the beginning of the 18th century 712 inhabitants lived in 180 buildings in the parish. In 1787, a chapel of Nossa Senhora de Penha de França (Our Lady of Peñafrancia) of was erected by the Madalena-native José Nunes da Silveira in Fajã da Praia. Another chapel, consecrated in the name of Nossa Senhora das Dores (Our Lady of Sorrows), was constructed in 1797, following the original's destruction during the 1672 eruption (which was also destroyed following the Capelinhos eruption).

Its civil parish status was returned on 1 October 1839, but only celebrated definitively in 1845, when it was extended from Praia de Baixo to the site of Ribeira das Canras.

During the course of the eruption of the Capelinhos volcano (between 1957 and 1958) the parish was shaken by earthquakes and inundated with ash. The church of Nossa Senhora das Dores was destroyed completely during the course of the earthquakes associated with the eruptions. The two-year event caused a flight of emigrants to the United States and Canada.

During the middle of the 20th century, the vineyards of the parish were attacked by pests that spread to the orange orchards and potato fields, causing loss of crops.

It was only in 1961 when a new modernist church was built.

=== CP Valour/Fajã Oil Spill ===
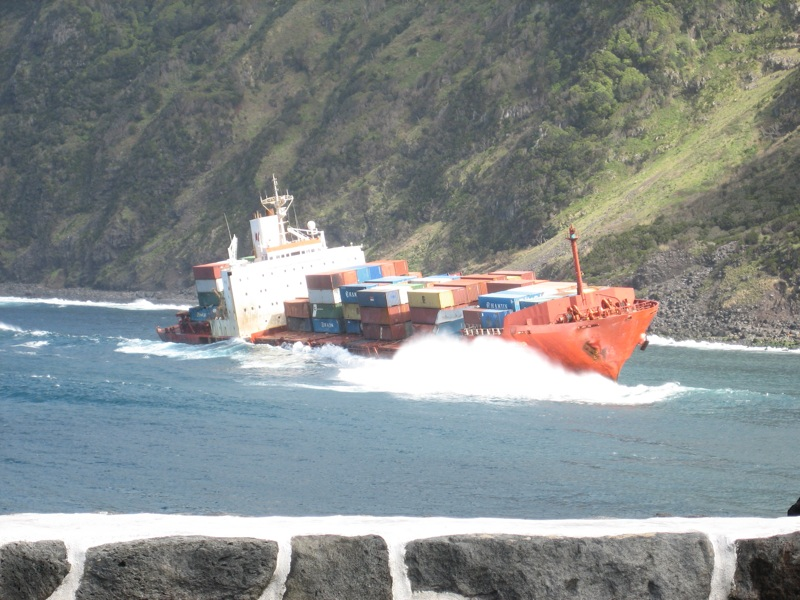
The CP Valour listing to the side, run aground along the coastline

On December 9, 2005 while attempting to navigate to calm waters in the Bay of Praia do Fajã, the container vessel CP Valour, a Bermudan-registered ship, originally traveling between Montreal, Quebec, Canada and Valencia, Spain, ran aground 300 metres (980 ft) from the coast. It was transporting 800 containers, of which three were environmentally hazardous, and the vessel was filled with two thousand tons of fuel oil. The tugboats "São Luís" (from the port of Horta) and "São Miguel" (from the port of Ponta Delgada) were called out to assist the crippled vessel, and were later aided by the Russian tug "Fortiy Frilov" (in order to stabilize the ship in northerly swells). However, the bay's currents forced the ship further to shore, forcing the abandonment of the ship on 25 December. The hulls eventually breached, causing an oil spill into the bay and onto the beach at Fajã. Similarly, some containers containing toxic fire retardant, flammable ink and paint and sodium persulphate were affected, and several containers were damaged or destroyed during the incident, leaking their contents into the bay. In the report on the accident, the Marine Accident Investigation Branch noted several failures including lack of crew management and procedures on the part of the operator, the inexperience and lack of seamanship of the master, and lack of proper nautical charts and anchoring experience. The accident brought world attention to Fajã da Praia, Faial and the Azores.

== Geography ==
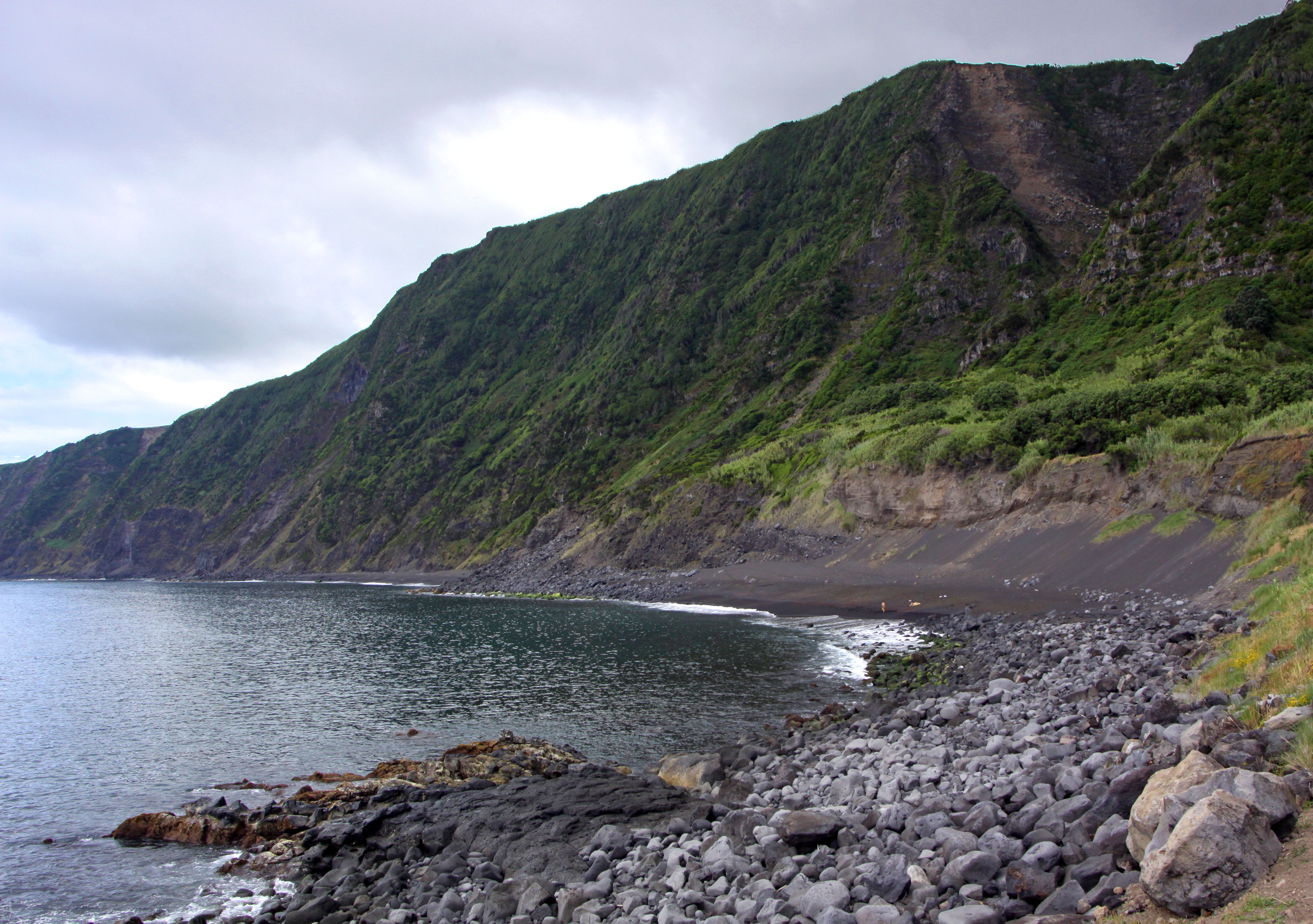
The stone and black sand beach of Fajã da Praia do Norte

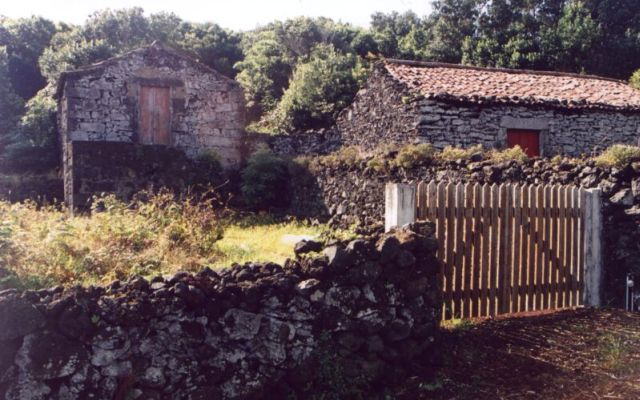
The microclimate makes summer homes and adegas (wine cellars) a popular fixture of Fajã

The parish is part of the Capelo Volcanic Complex, a geologic area of layered ash and pyroclastic deposits produced less than 10,000 years ago. The rural town occupies the space along the regional roadway, while summer homes and some permanent residents occupy the "fajã" along the coast, known as Fajã da Praia do Norte.

A fajã is the term used to define a small extension of land, located along the ocean, formed from rock debris or a volcanic delta from lava meeting the ocean. The bay in Fajã is protected cove, sheltered by steep arriba covered in Laurasilva forest, that developed from the historic eruption of Cabeço do Fogo (1672-1673). The geological formation and the existence of a micro-climate allows human habitation, making it an ideal destination for tourists and local summer homes, as well as the adega wine cellars. A small beach, from which the name Praia do Norte originates, provides an area of activities along its several metres of dark sand areal during the summer. But, the beach is primarily popular with surfers, since offshore conditions allow for large waves throughout the year. The eastern portion of the parish is a tall and abrupt cliff that is connected to Cedros plateau.

Along the shoreline is also a nascent port, formed by a lava flow resulting in the formation of Xenoliths. With little more than 30 inhabitants, the focus of the small community is the Hermitage of Nossa Senhora da Penha de França, constructed in 1787.

== Economy ==
Following the Cabeço do Fogo eruption, much of the lands in the parish were sterile and uncultivatable due to the ash. Gradually, agriculture returned to the area, although the region has been affected by the collapses in the wine, orange and potato crises during the 19-20th century. Cattle and dairy production are one of the two pillars of the economy today. The residents of the parish also rely on fishing, some boat construction and rock/sand extraction as basic sources of income. Although tourism is not an obvious cash stream, the area has unspoiled coastal areas, panoramic views towards Capelo (visible from Ribeira das Cabres) and high cliffs that attract or stop visitors regularly in the area.

== Culture ==
The feast day of its patron saint, dedicated to Nossa Senhora das Dores, is celebrated on the Sunday following September 15. It chapel was constructed twice: in 1797, following its destruction by Cabeço do Fogo in 1672; and in 1961, following its destruction during the Capelinhos eruption. The feast days of St. Peter (29 June) are celebrated in Fajã, and Our Lady of Penafrancia (8 September) at its chapel built in 1787.

The area is known for many of the same agricultural dishes emblematic of this region, including a pork stew, its wine (produced from the many rock vineyards of the Fajã) and a traditional corn flat-bread.
