= Cabeço Gordo =

Highest point in the island of Faial

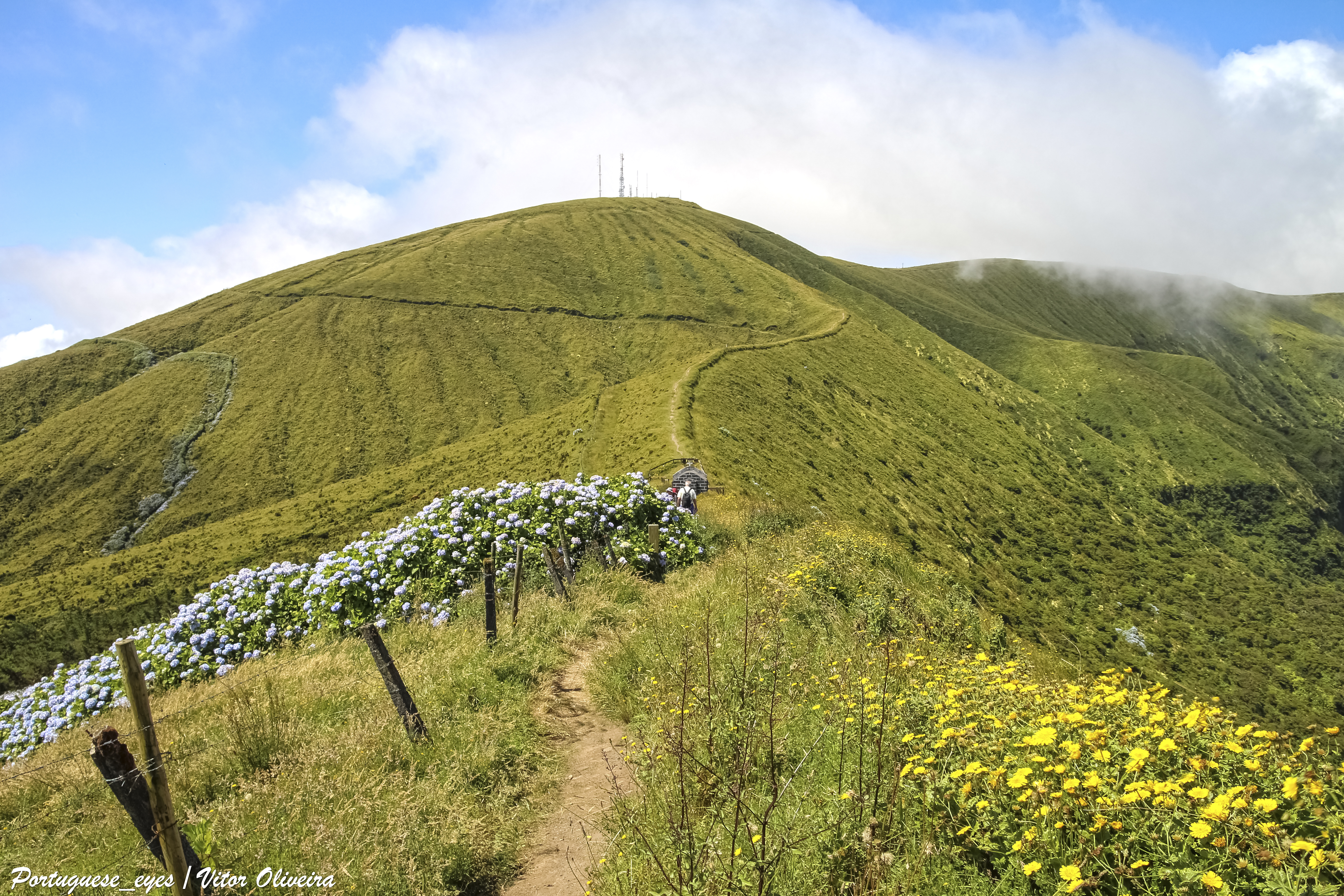

Highest point
- Elevation: 1,043 m (3,422 ft)
- Prominence: 1,043 m (3,422 ft)
- Listing: Ribu
- Coordinates: 38°34′32.9″N 28°42′47.2″W

Geography
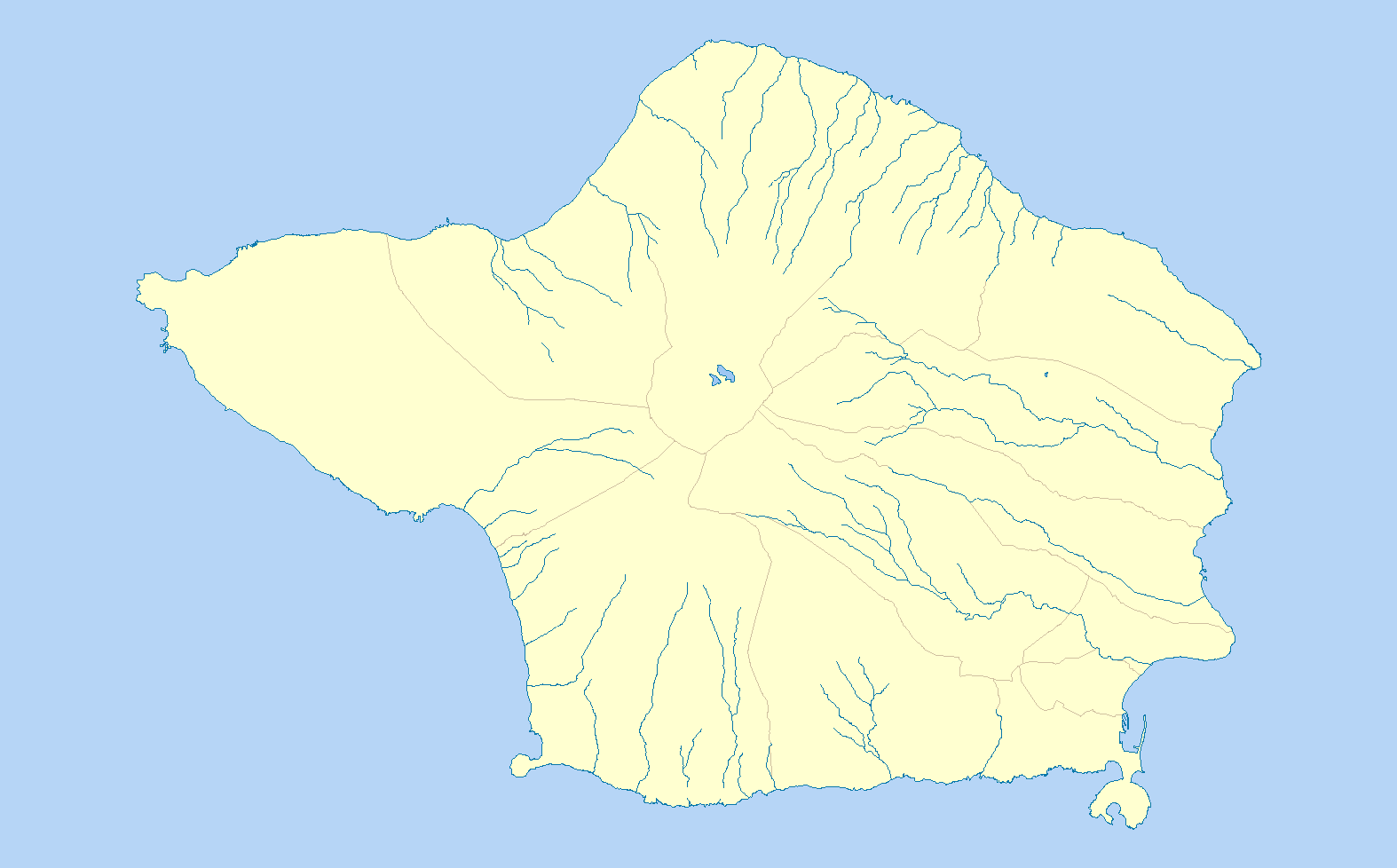
- Location within Faial
- Location: Faial, Azores, Portugal
- Parent range: Mid-Atlantic Ridge

Cabeço Gordo (Portuguese for "fat mound") is the highest point in the island of Faial, measuring 1,043 metres (3,422 ft) above sea level. Located on the southern rim of the Caldeira Volcano, on a clear day, most of the islands of the central group of the Azores are visible: Pico, São Jorge, and Graciosa, although normally the caldera may be covered in clouds and fog.
