= Lighthouse of Vale Formoso =

Lighthouse of Vale Formoso Farol de Vale Formoso
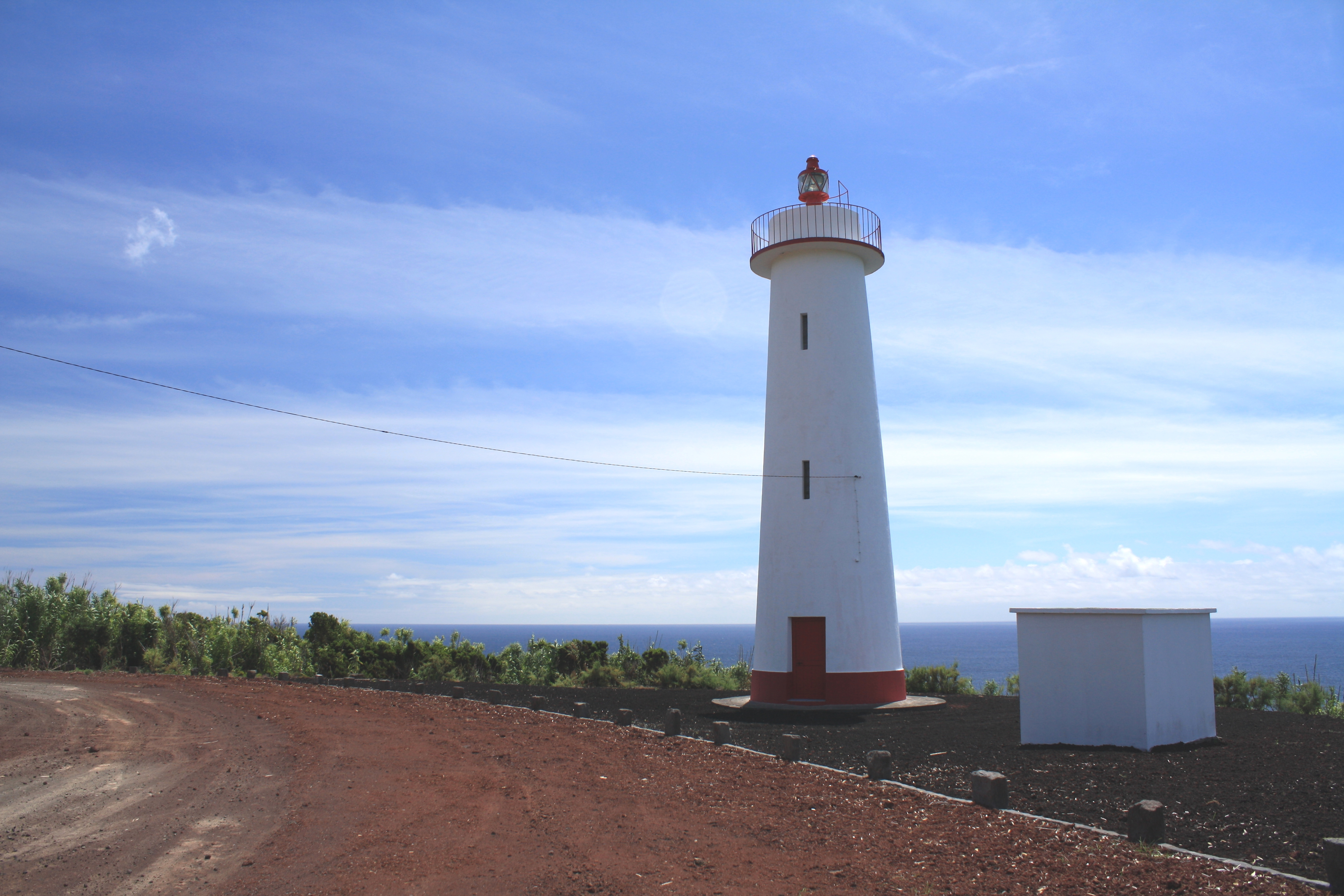
- The lighthouse on the edge of the cliff with utility building
- Location: (Portugal) Faial, Horta
- Coordinates: 38°34′52.1″N 28°48′40.3″W

Tower
- Constructed: 1950s
- Construction: concrete tower
- Height: 14 metres (46 ft)
- Shape: 14 metres (46 ft) circular
- Markings: white tower
- Power source: mains electricity
- Operator: Ministério da Defesa Nacional; Marinha de Guerra; Directorate for Lighthouses (Direcção de Faróis)
- Heritage: Unclassified
- Fog signal: No

Light
- Focal height: 114 metres (374 ft)
- Range: 12 nmi (22 km)
- Characteristic: 2 Fl W 10s.
- Portugal no.: PT-868

The Lighthouse of Vale Formoso (Portuguese: Farol de Vale Formoso) is a beacon/lighthouse located along the southwestern cliffs of the civil parish of Capelo, in the municipality of Horta, on the Portuguese island of Faial, in the archipelago of the Azores.

== History ==
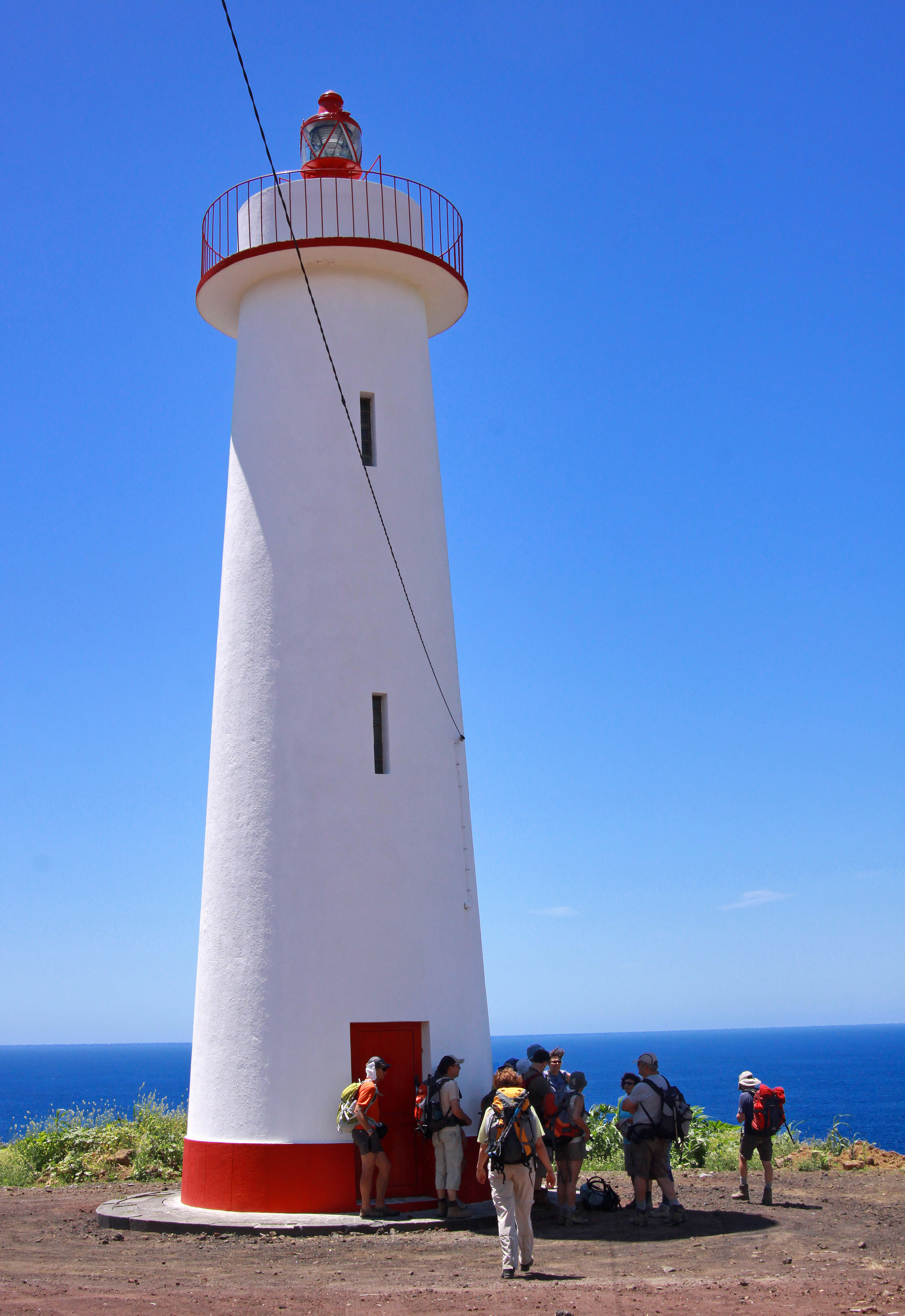
The circular, reinforced concrete lighthouse constructed as a purposeful replacement to the destroyed Capelinhos lighthouse

The lighthouse was constructed to substitute the destroyed lighthouse on the promontory of Capelinhos, following the eruption of the volcano in 1957–1958.

== Architecture ==
The lighthouse is located along the Capelo peninsula, along the southern coast of the island, approximately 2.5 kilometres (1.6 mi) southeast of the lighthouse of Capelinhos.

It consists of a truncated white circular tower constructed of reinforced contract with gallery and small red beacon on its top. Approximately three storeys tall, each registry is marked by a slit window, culminating in the top platform with guardrail.
