= Caldeira Volcano =

Volcano in the Azores, Portugal

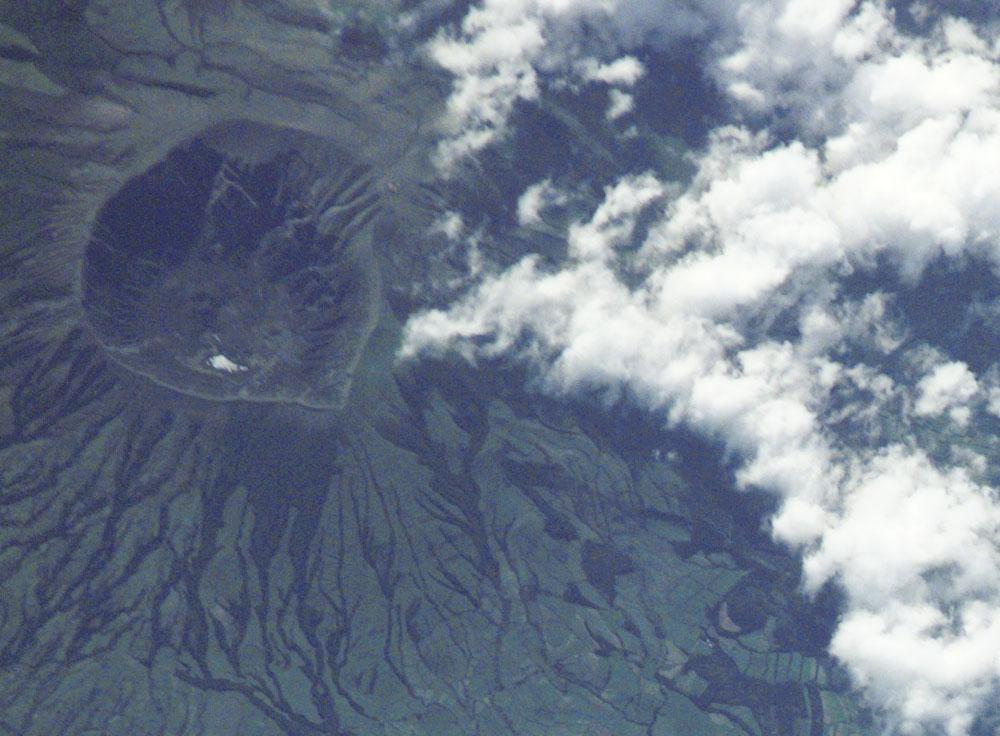
- Caldeira Volcano seen from space

Highest point
- Elevation: 1,043 m (3,422 ft)
- Coordinates: 38°35′09″N 28°42′53.6″W

Geography
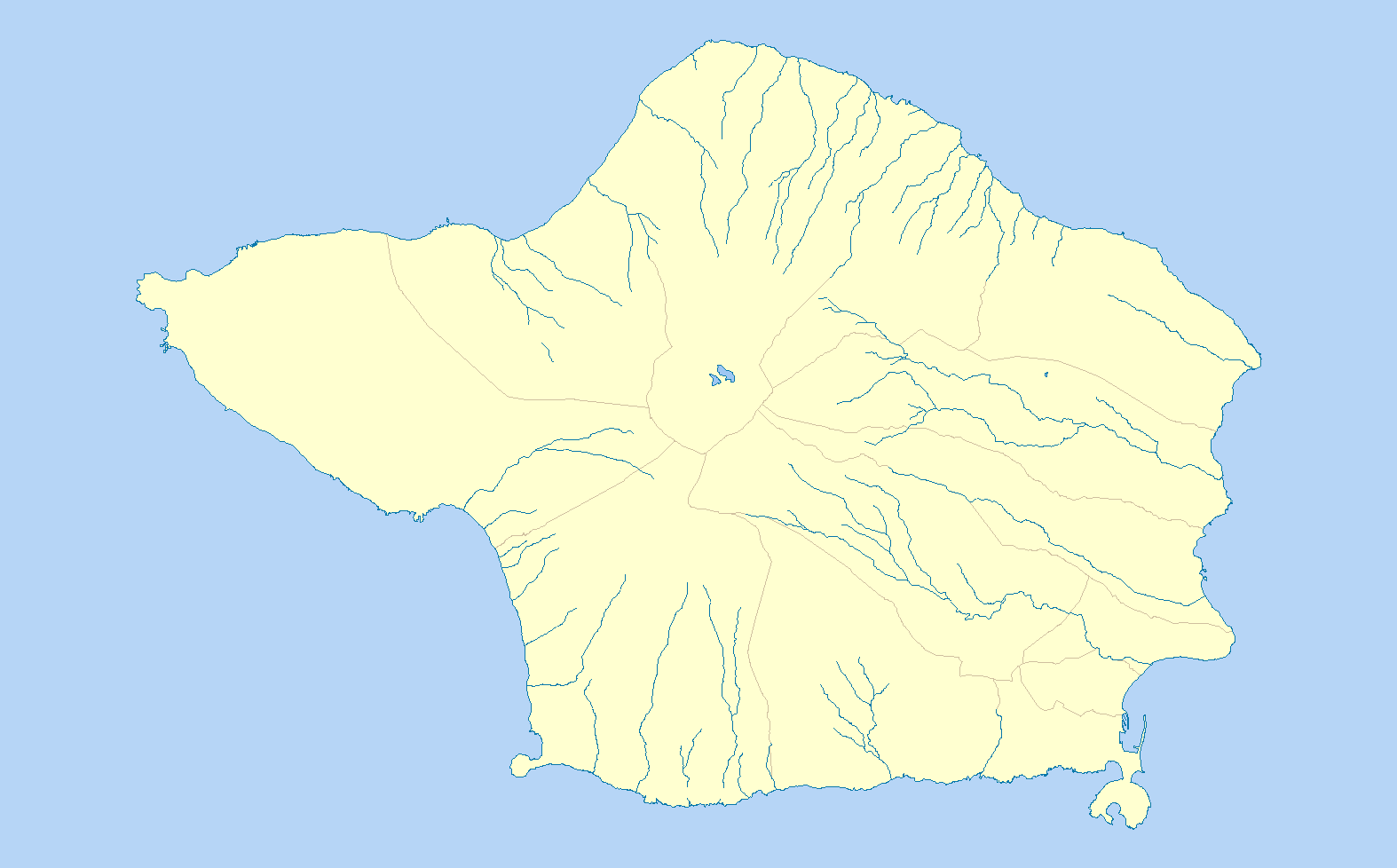
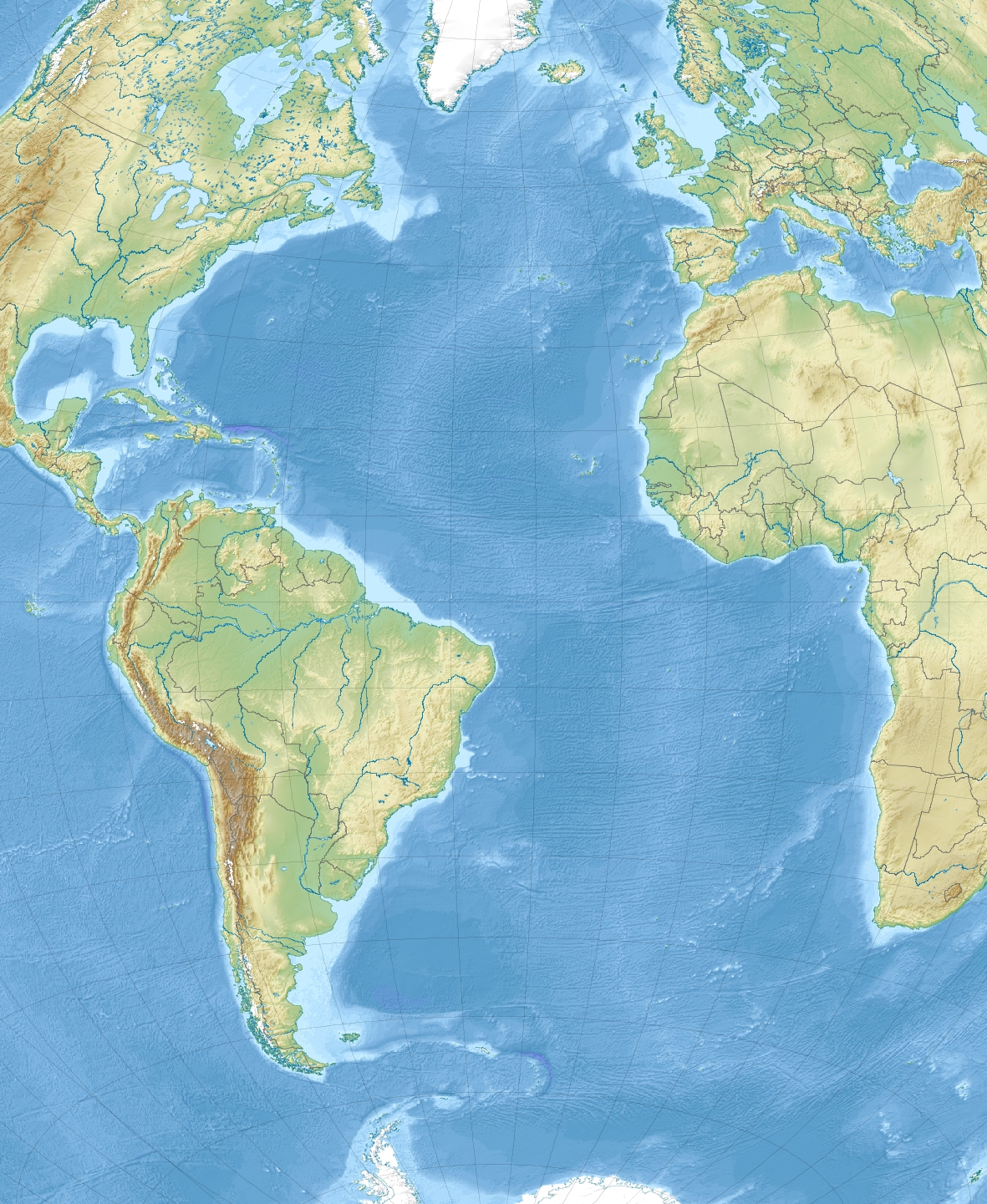
- Location within Azores Location within Faial Location within Atlantic Ocean
- Location: Faial Island, Azores
- Parent range: Mid-Atlantic Ridge

Geology
- Rock age: 470,000 - 11,000 Years
- Mountain type: Volcanic crater/Stratovolcano
- Last eruption: 1958

Climbing
- Easiest route: YDS Grade I

The Caldeira Volcano (Portuguese: Vulcão da Caldeira, Portuguese pronunciation: [vuɫˈkɐ̃w̃ dɐ kalˈdɐj.ɾɐ]) is the highest mountain, massive stratovolcano and the largest geomorphological structure that forms the island of Faial. The mountain's highest point, Cabeço Gordo, reaches 1,043 metres (3,422 ft) above sea level. One of the most notable features of this volcano is its two kilometer wide caldera, that is 400 m (1,300 ft) in depth below the crater rim.

== History ==
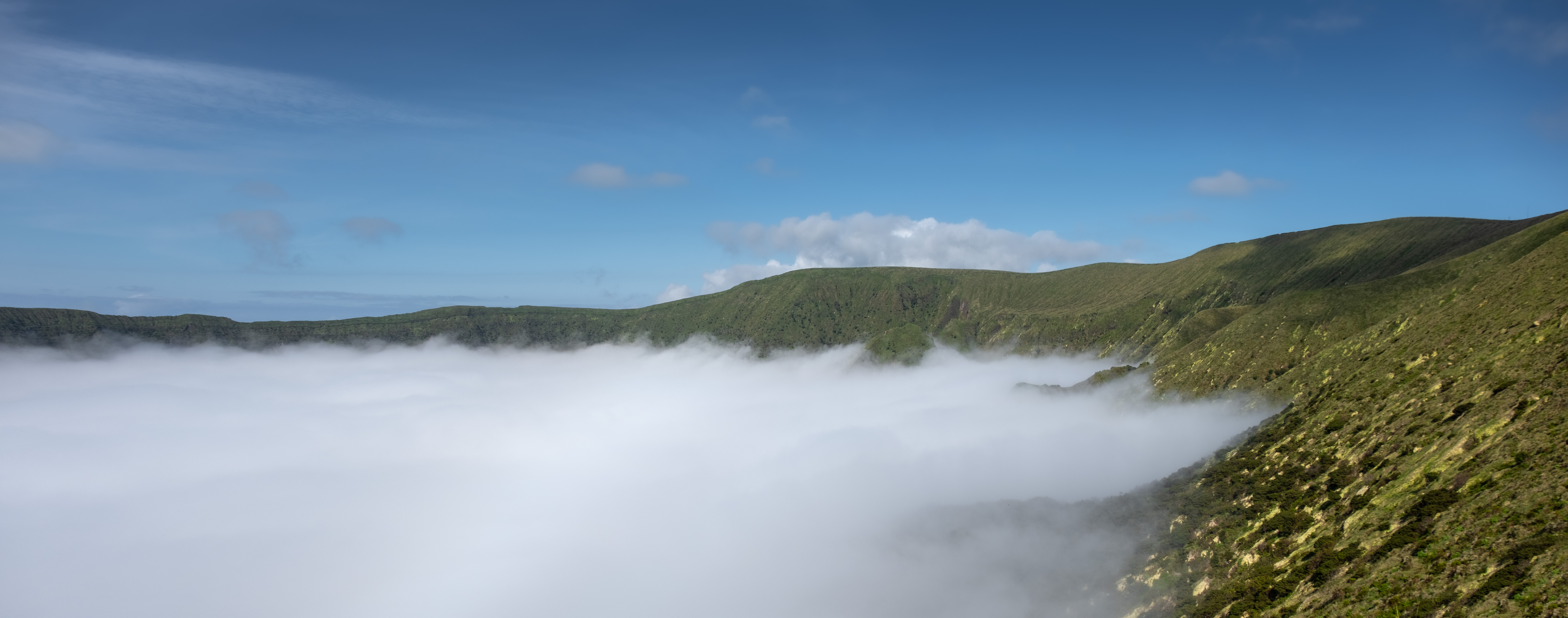
The volcano's bowl-shaped caldeira preventing fog from escaping

Along the western edge of the Ribeirinha Volcano, the Central Volcanic Complex formed about 410,000 years ago, along with several structures that arose from tectonics. Evidence of this process has not been preserved due to subsidence, but it is generally believed that two formations (an Upper and Lower group) reflecting a geochemical variation that occurred about 16,000 years ago. The Lower group (from 410,000 years ago), was marked by the predominance of a Hawaiian/Strombolian eruptive process, that was composed of basaltic and benmoreitic rocks. The secondary, Upper group, was a highly explosive period (sub-Plinian in character), which produced a series of twelve deposits of pumice and surge deposits (pyroclastic flows of trachytic and benmoreitic).

The volcano was reduced by around 300 m (980 ft) in height due to an eruption that occurred around 1000 years ago. This was one of the last major explosive events recorded in the Azores.

Although the central volcano has not been active within the past two centuries, it has seen activity related to the eruption of Capelinhos (1957–58). During this period, fumaroles in the caldera became active, and the minor lakes/swamps were dried-up by excessive heat.

The volcano, due to its central nature, is part of each parish on the island (except for Matriz, Conceição and Angustias).

== Geography ==
Caldeira Do Faial Nature Reserve
- IUCN category Ib (wilderness area)
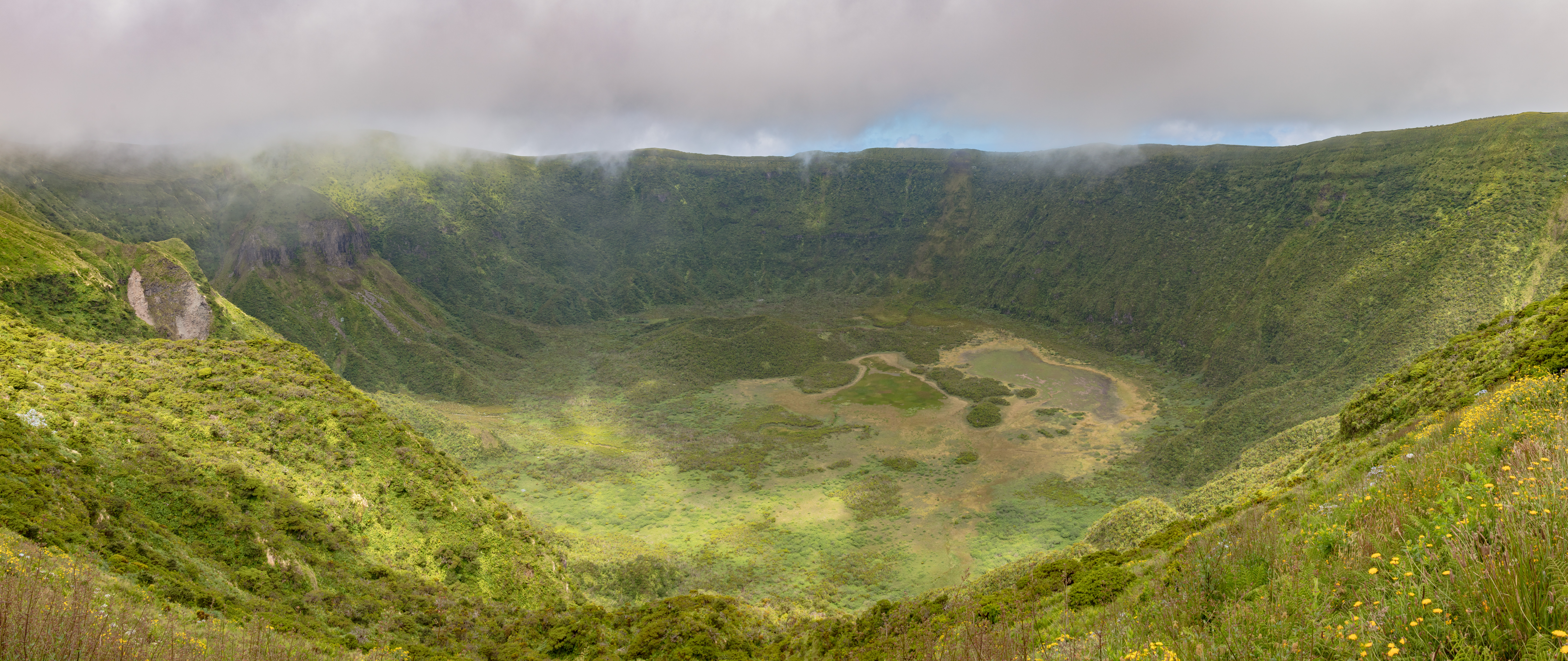
- Panoramic view of the volcano.
- Interactive map of Caldeira Do Faial Nature Reserve
- Area: 3.13 km^{2} (1.21 sq mi)
- Established: 1972
- Governing body: Azores Government (Governo Regional dos Açores)

The Caldeira Volcano is the main geomorphological unit, corresponding to a polygenetic volcano two kilometers at the top and one kilometer at the base. The walls of the crater rim are abrupt, although their slopes increase with altitudes. The superficial cover of the volcano is covered in pyroclastic material, such as pumice rock, phreatic and phreatomagmatic deposits, evidence of pyroclastic flows and lahars. The flanks of the stratovolcano also include the Morro de Castelo Branco and peninsula of denser material that have resisted erosion.
