= Christophe Neff =

German-French geographer

Christophe Neff (born 10 June 1964 in Tübingen, West Germany) is a Franco-German geographer, working on Mediterranean ecosystems, the geography of the Mediterranean Basin and fire ecology at the Karlsruhe Institute of Technology. He is considered as one of the rare German experts on the Mediterranean ecosystem and fire ecology. Furthermore, he is an expert on the geography of Francophone Africa and Lusophone Africa and the Azores. Neff has worked more than 20 years on the island of Faial exploring the vegetation dynamics on the Capelinhos Volcano . The Portuguese TV dedicated a little tv report to his fieldwork on the Capelinhos volcano.

Since 2009, Neff regularly contributes to a blog called 'Paysages' (engl.= landscapes) at le Monde.fr, which is mostly written in French, sometimes in German, and very occasionally in English. On the 23 of April 2019 Neff announced on his blog, that he will finished editing “paysages” on the blog hosting service of LeMonde.fr, because Le Monde has decided to close up the Blogs Le Monde.fr. He also explained that he would try to relaunch “Paysages” with another hosting service. In the same post he also expressed his regrets that the cultural gap between France and Germany had never been as large as in 2019, reminding readers that the original idea had been to create a franco-german blog. In June 2019 he relauchned his blog „paysages“ on wordpress.com. In June 2021 he published a trilingual (French, German, English) retrospective of 12 years editing the blog paysages, including also a list of the most popular blog posts. In January 2022, he noted that a large part of the links from the times when paysages was still hosted by le Monde.fr had disappeared in the meantime
