= Capelinhos =

Monogenetic volcano on Faial Island in the Azores

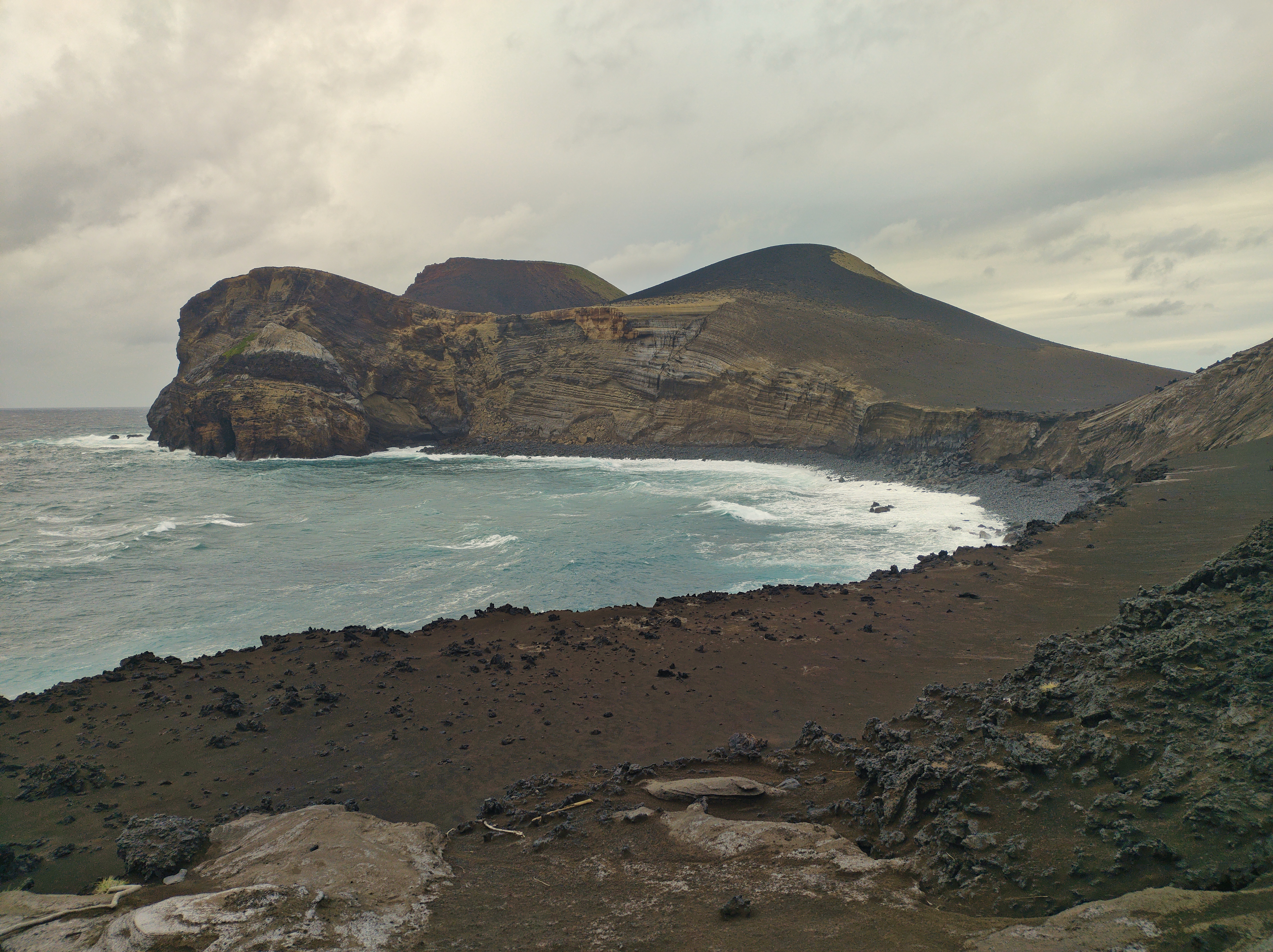

Highest point
- Elevation: 501 m (1,644 ft)
- Coordinates: 38.601°N 28.834°W

Geography
- Location: Faial Island, Azores
- Parent range: Capelo Volcanic Complex

Geology
- Rock age(s): between September 27, 1957 (age 68) and October 24, 1958 (age 67)
- Mountain types: Surtseyan (from 27 September 1957 to 13 May 1958); Strombolian (from 14 May 1958 to 24 October 1958)
- Last eruption: 1957 to 1958

The Capelinhos (from Capelo + -inhos diminutive, which literally means "little cape") is a monogenetic volcano located on the western coast of Faial Island in the Azores. It is part of the larger volcanic complex of Capelo, which includes 20 scoria cones and lava fields that are aligned west-northwest to east-southeast from the Caldeira Volcano caldera. Although the name "Capelinhos" is associated with the volcano, it technically refers to the western cape of the parish of Capelo. It can be considered the westernmost point of Europe; there are more westerly islands in the Azores archipelago but they lie on the North American Plate.

A volcanic eruption lasted for 13 months, from September 27, 1957 until October 24, 1958, which may have been two overlapping volcanic eruptions. While enlarging the land by 2.4 km^{2}, it spawned 300 seismic events, hurled ash 1 km, destroyed 300 houses in the parishes of Capelo and Praia do Norte and caused the evacuation of 2,000 people (emigration to the US and Canada). On October 25, the volcano entered a period of dormancy. It is a part of an active fissural volcanic complex which creates multiple seismic and volcanic events.

== Geography and ecology ==
Capelinhos is located along the Capelo Volcanic Complex, that comprises a western area of fissural volcanism and historical eruptions leading away from the Cabeço do Fogo. The events that began in 1957 were an extension of the volcanic activity that abruptly ended at Costado da Nau, the escarpment at Ponta dos Capelinhos. Similar to the Horta Platform, the peninsula is consistent with the shapes and products resulting from Surtseyan, Strombolian and Hawaiian volcanic types. The formation is composed primarily of basaltic rocks, although, less frequently, Hawaiian hawaiitic rocks are observed.

Capelinhos is classified a Surtseyan eruption, since it was formed in the relatively shallow coast of the Faial seamount. However, Victor Hugo Forjaz, a volcanologist and full professor at the University of the Azores, defends that the type of eruption should have been designated as Capelinian as it pre-dates the eruption of Surtsey by five years and was studied both by Portuguese and foreign scientists.

Located at Cabeço Norte, a volcanic vent releases water vapour with temperatures between 180 °C and 200 °C from the volcano complex.

The geographer Christophe Neff is carrying field studies on the pioneer vegetation in the Capelinhos area since 1999. In a recently published paper in “Finisterra” he wrote in the English abstract of the paper “Fifty years after the Capelinhos eruption we cannot find any tree or bushes on the volcano.

=== IUGS geological heritage site ===
In respect of its importance in enhancing understanding of submarine volcanoes, Capelhinos was included by the International Union of Geological Sciences (IUGS) in its assemblage of 100 'geological heritage sites' around the world in a listing published in October 2022.

== History ==
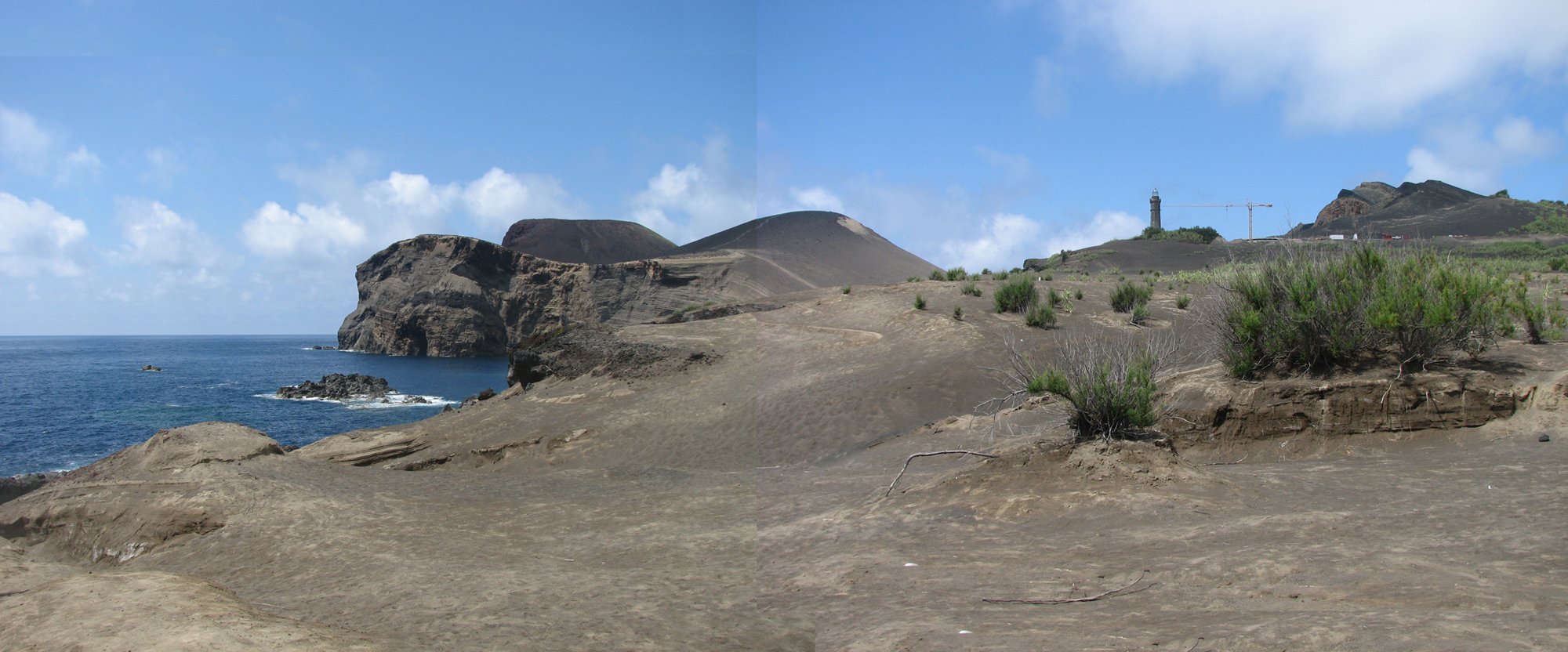
Capelinhos Volcano, Faial Island, Azores, showing the lighthouse which marked the western coastal limit of Ponta dos Capelinhos

The Capelinhos eruption represented the first time that a submarine eruption was documented from beginning to end. Its location near an inhabited island with good communications meant it could be intensively studied. The first activities during the eruption were identified by engineer Frederico Machado, the Director of the District Public Works Department, his assistant engineer João do Nascimento and surveyor António Denis, under the authorization of the Civil Governor, Freitas Pimentel. The Director of the Observatory in Angra, Lieutenant-Colonel José Agostinho overflew the area, and Bernado Almada (at the Prince Albert of Monaco Observatory, in Horta) sent several bulletins relating the increased seismic activity of the area.

Between September 16 and 27, 1957, 200 earthquakes of intensity V (Moderate) on the Mercalli scale were registered. On September 23, the ocean waters off the coast of Ponte dos Capelinhos began to boil, and the first vapours were witnessed around 6:30 a.m. one kilometre northwest of the lighthouse. A constant tremor could be sensed, at times reaching a Level IV on the Mercalli scale (MM-31). Three days later, the activity increased; black ash (to about 1400 m) and water vapour (to about 4000 m) rose west of the two ilhéus (English: islets) off the coast. On September 27, beginning at about 6:45 in the morning, a submarine eruption, 300 m from Ponta dos Capelinhos (100 m from the Ilhéus dos Capelinhos) began. Whale spotters at Costado da Nau, a few meters above the Capelinhos lighthouse, saw the ocean churning to the west and alerted the lighthouse keepers. On October 5: "...the clouds of clay likely rose about one kilometre in height and solid fragments...reaching an area of 1200 metres around..." The buildings in the area began to experience the first damages: windows were broken, tiles fell from the roofs. By the next day, the first ash-fall began on land; "in a few hours a black mat covered the extreme West of island...", reaching 2.5 kilometres from the crater, necessitating the evacuation of the settlements of Norte Pequeno and Canto. Initially, gases and pyroclastic explosions persisted until October 13, while gradually diminishing, but were rapidly replaced by violent explosions, lava bombs, ash and lava streaming into the sea. This intense eruption occurred until the end of October with constant ash raining on Faial, destroying cultural lands, inhibiting normal farming and forcing the residents from local villages to evacuate. By October 10, the eruption had initially formed a small island, baptized Ilha Nova (English: the New Island), Ilha dos Capelinhos (English: Island of Capelinhos) or Ilha do Espírito Santo (English: Island of the Holy Spirit) by the locals, 600 meter diameter and 30 meter height with an open crater to the sea. By October 29, the island grew to 99 meters high and 800 meters in diameter of coarse black ash.

By the end of the first phase of the eruption, three reporters, Carlos Tudela and Vasco Hogan Teves from public television Rádio e Televisão de Portugal (RTP), journalist Urbano Carrasco (from the newspaper Diário Popular) and boat pilot Carlos Raulino Peixoto risked their lives by traveling to the Ilha Nova. Arriving on the island, they planted a Portuguese flag, before hurriedly leaving. The New Island had disappeared into the sea by 30 October.

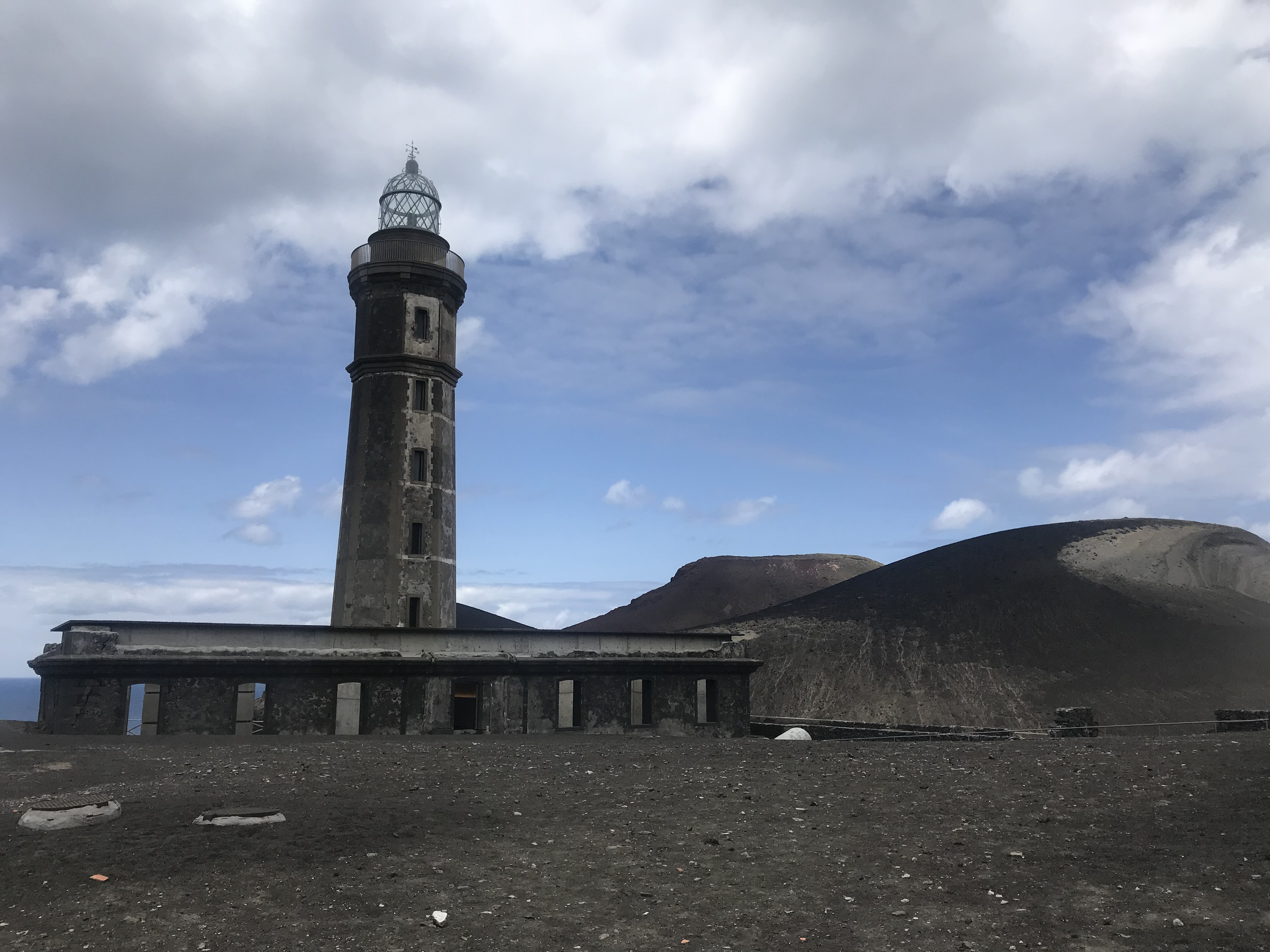
The lighthouse at Capelinhos.

On November 4, 1957 a second volcanic event occurred rapidly, forming a second island, and by 12 November 1957 an isthmus had formed linking it with Faial. Explosions and ejecta increased progressively, reaching a climax by 15 December when a second cone was formed. Following a night of torrential rains and ash (on or about 16 November) the explosive activity ceased, and an effusive lava phase began with more ash and explosive rock. By then the largest eruptive column had reached 1450 metres into the air, carrying with it ash from the northwest for a distance of 20 kilometres (6 December). A final pause began on 29 December.

Between January and April 1958, new showers of ash and accompanying water vapour (both white and darkened) persisted, and the two Ilhéus off the coast of Ponte dos Capelinhos had disappeared under the sand and ash. During this period the cinder cone and isthmus became an integral part of the island of Faial, destroying the roofs of the local buildings and infilling the space to the lighthouse. From May 12–18, 450 seismic events were recorded as the volcano moved into a Strombolian phase, emitting projectiles 500 m into the air, causing moderate explosions and accompanied by infra-sonic waves that shook doors and windows on the island and some adjacent islands. This final phase lasted several months: the last lava currents were visible on 21 October, and the last projectiles were reported on 24 October. During this final stage (around 14 May), fumaroles were discovered inside Faial's caldera, that began emitting sulfurous water vapor, boiling clay and mud.

Although one person nearly fell into the Capelinhos crater, there were no deaths from the eruption; generally, ash deposits and some projectiles caused the destruction of homes and the blanketing of agricultural lands in the parishes of Capelo and Praia do Norte. A report presented on 15 January 1958 indicated that 164 families had been affected by the eruption.

Due to the close relationship between Portugal and the United States, refugees from the beleaguered parishes emigrated. The Azorean Refugee Act (September 2, 1958), authorized the emigration of 1,500 people and was sponsored by Democratic Congressmen John O. Pastore of Rhode Island, and a young Senator John F. Kennedy of Massachusetts. In addition to many families from the area of Capelo, other citizens of the Azores benefited from these temporary measures. This resulted in a 50% decrease of the resident population of Capelo, and contributed to an increased standard of living, greater working opportunities and some improvements in base incomes.

== Tourism ==
The volcano is a landmark on Faial; its ruined lighthouse and Visitors Center (which lies along the cliff from the volcano) is a tourist destination. A trail network runs from the Visitors Center and lighthouse to the caldera summit. On September 27, 2007, commemorations marking the 50th anniversary of the eruption and its effects on the island's history and people were broadcast in Portugal and throughout the Azorean diaspora.
