= Civil Government =

Flag of the civil governors still in use de jure

In Portugal, the Civil Governments (Portuguese: Governos Civis, singular Governo Civil) are the bodies of public administration that represent the central government at the district level. Each Civil Government is headed by an administrative magistrate (delegate of the central government), the civil governor (Portuguese: Governador Civil, plural Governadores Civis), appointed by the Council of Ministers, and under the remit of the Ministry of Internal Administration.

The role of Civil Governments has become smaller since their creation in 1835. At first, they had broad powers of representation of the central government and the responsibility to coordinate all state services within the district; currently, they serve as, in practice, local delegations of the Ministry of Internal Administration, charged with issuing passports, public safety, and electoral procedure.

In 2011, Prime Minister Pedro Passos Coelho de facto abolished all Civil Governments with Decree-Law No. 114/2011 of 30 November, that transfers all competences of the Civil Governments to other administrative bodies (such as the Municipal Chambers, the Police, the National Republican Guard, and the National Authority for Civil Protection). Even though no Civil Governors have been appointed since, the post is established in the Constitution and, de jure, is still extant.
