= António José de Ávila, 2nd Marquis of Ávila and Bolama =

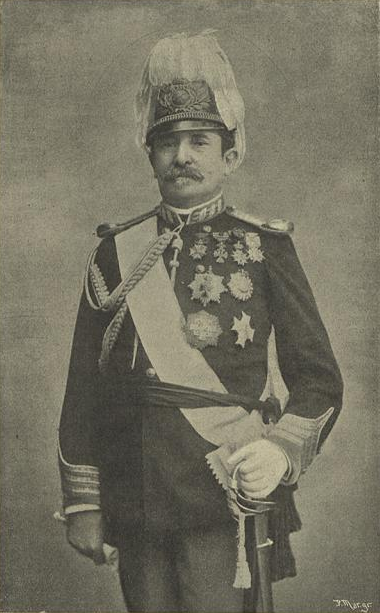
The Marquis of Ávila

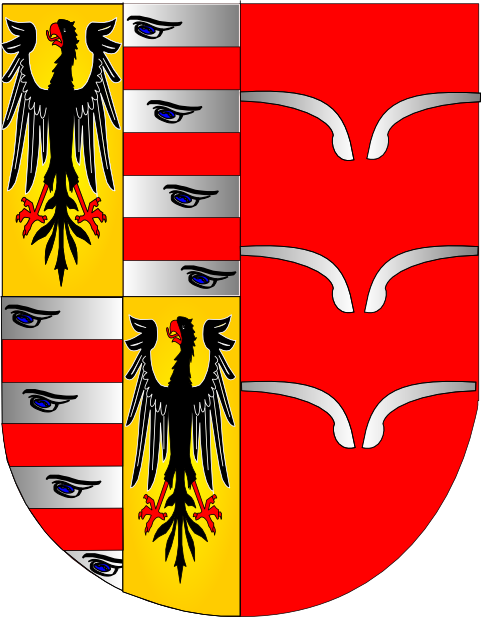
Coat of Arms of the Duke of Ávila and Bolama.

António José de Ávila (7 November 1842 in Horta – 18 March 1917 in Lisbon) was a military officer, politician, member of the Portuguese nobility (made Marquis of Ávila, following the death of his illustrious uncle) and benemerit.

== Biography ==
António José was born on the island of Faial to Manuel José de Ávila (brother of the Duke of Ávila) and D. Maria Leonor de Almeida e Silva.

Simultaneously with his military career at the Military School, he completed his studies at the University of Coimbra, obtaining a bachelor's degree in mathematics. After initiating his studies in the officer's program, he was promoted to alferes in 1868 and scaled, throughout his life, the military hierarchy: lieutenant (1870), captain (1873), major (1884), lieutenant-colonel (1890), colonel (1893) and brigade general (1906), where he eventually passed into the reserves in 1909. During this career, as lieutenant he became a functionary in the Ministry of Public Works (Portuguese: Ministério das Obras Públicas), where he held the post of exam jurist in the Civil Engineering course. At several times during this career he represented Portugal in the foreign conventions, and held the post of Director General of Geodesey (1901–1912).

He married D. Maria Leonor de Assis Mascarenhas, daughter of General Carlos de Mascarenhas, brother of the Marquis of Fronteira.

He inherited from his uncle the title of Count of Ávila (25 January 1890) and 2nd Marquess de Ávila (31 December 1903).

=== Political career ===
He became president of the Municipal Council of Lisbon, and in various legislatures, as deputy in the national parliament. Having been promoted into the political life by his uncle, he held a position in the Chamber of Deputies (1875–78), representing the electoral circle of Valpaços. In later elections, he was selected for the electoral districts of Vila Pouca de Aguiar (during three legislatures) and Vila Real (during two legislatures). His career in the Chamber of Deputies began in 1875, and only ceased on 2 December 1885) when he was elected Peer of the Kingdom, for the electoral districts of Horta and Vila Real (he opted for the latter): he maintained this peerage until 1909. During his career as deputy and peer, he participated in several parliamentary commissions, namely: Recruitment and Public Works (Portuguese: Recrutamento e Obras Públicas), War (Portuguese: Guerra) and Political Reform (Portuguese: Reformas Politicas). He presented several proposals for laws: 10 March 1882, reformulate the polytechnic schools; 31 January 1883, regulating judges competencies; 2 April 1883 and 26 January 1884, conceding to the Municipal Council of Horta and Santa Casa da Misericórdia several buildings (specifically the Convent of the Jesuits and Convent of São Francisco, respectively).

Although early in his life he opted to represent Vila Real, he was an extremely diligent and active supporter of the peoples of the district of Horta (and in particular, Faial). This is obvious in the amount of correspondence found in the Arquivos Particulares Ávila e Boloma (Personal Archive of the Dukes of Ávila e Boloma), in the Torre do Tombo National Archive and in the deliberations of the Municipal and Santa Casa Councils. In addition to helping install the Municipal Council in the former-Jesuit College, the Count was helpful in installing the financial departments of the council, the conservatory and judicial tribunal and donating funds for streets, as well as repairs for the ports and docks. The O Globe wrote, "Count of Ávila [managed to wrangle] from the Rengerator Government the concession of the vast edifice and courtyard of the extinct convent of the Franciscans...and for the Convent of Glória...[as well as] advantages in the contracts for the ship navigating to the metropole and the ports of the islands in our territory...and the preparatory work that resulted in the yards for the submarine cables that put us in rapid communication with the world." The Count was also responsible for the influencing the construction of the lighthouses of Capelinhos and Flores.

=== Later life ===
In gratitude for his services, the Santa Casa da Misercórdia and Municipal Council of Horta, hanged portraits in their halls, while in memory, the road to the north of the Municipal building was renamed Rua do Major Ávila. In addition, on 13 June 1896, an arterial road in Angústias was named Rua Conde de Ávila.
