= Mama Lighthouse =

Mama Lighthouse (Portugal) Farol da Mama
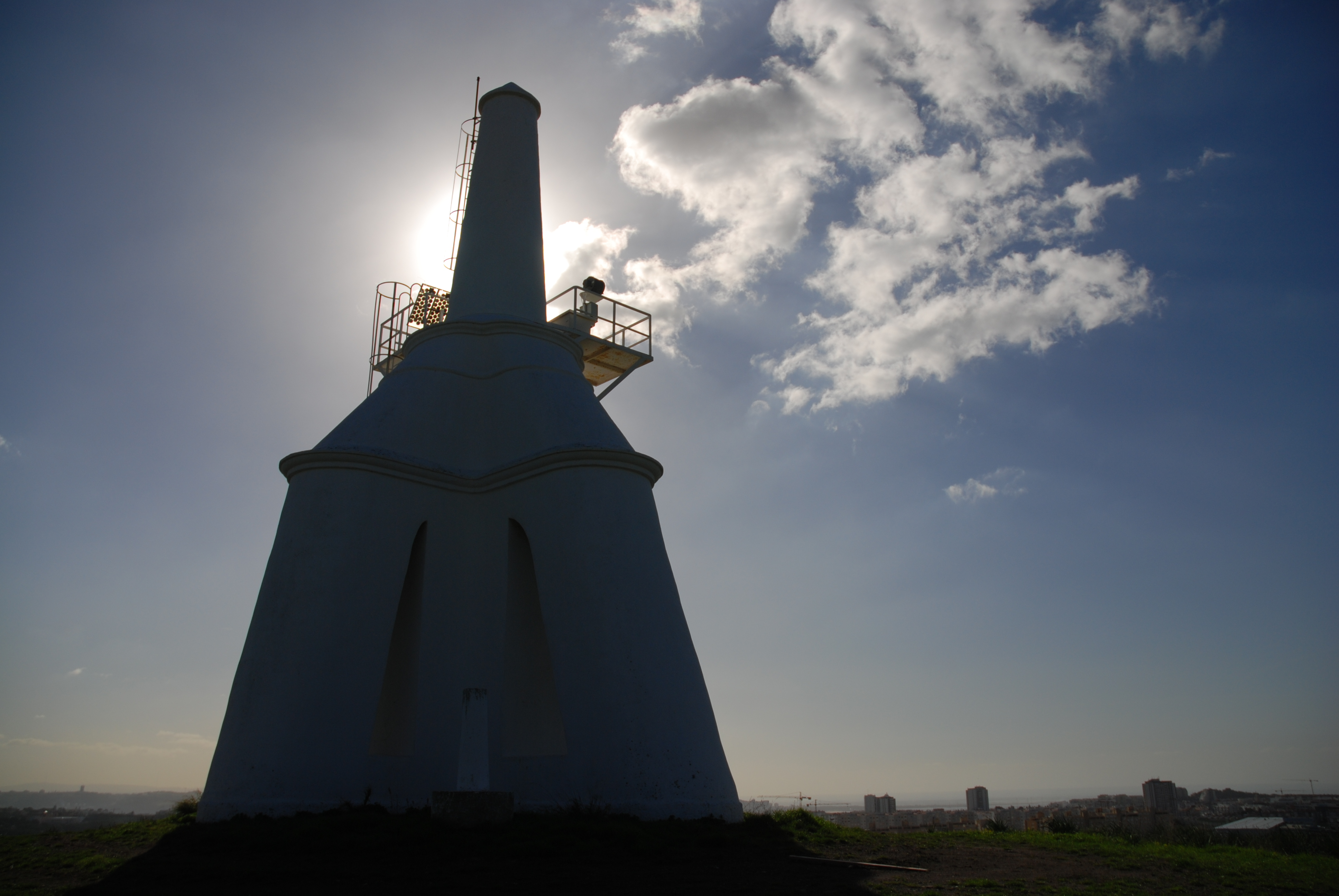
- Location: Oeiras, Lisbon District, Portugal
- Coordinates: 38°43′39.2″N 9°13′38.1″W

Tower
- Constructed: originally established 1857
- Automated: 1995
- Height: 21 metres (69 ft)
- Heritage: heritage without legal protection

Light
- Focal height: 82 m (269 ft)
- Lens: Fifth-order Fresnel
- Range: 24 nautical miles
- Characteristic: Occ R 6s

The Mama lighthouse (Portuguese: Farol da Mama) is located in the Carnaxide Sierra (Portuguese: Serra de Carnaxide) of the municipality of Oeiras, in Lisbon District, Portugal. It is built on a round hill, known as the Mama Sul, next to a Geodesic landmark. The Mama Lighthouse is about 4 km inland, northwest of Belém, and combines with the Esteiro and Gibalta lighthouses to indicate the alignment of the southern entrance to the Port of Lisbon.

== History ==
The entrance to Lisbon's port has for long been made difficult by a sandy bar in the River Tagus estuary. Until the 19th Century fishermen with a detailed knowledge of the river would provide piloting services to commercial shipping, with assistance from beacons lit on the neighbouring hills, including the Mama Sul. The first known reference to its use for navigation was in 1607, by which time it is believed that a building to serve as a marker had already been constructed. However, it is likely that the hill, without a building, had been used as a point of reference for many years before, possibly since the time of Roman occupation.

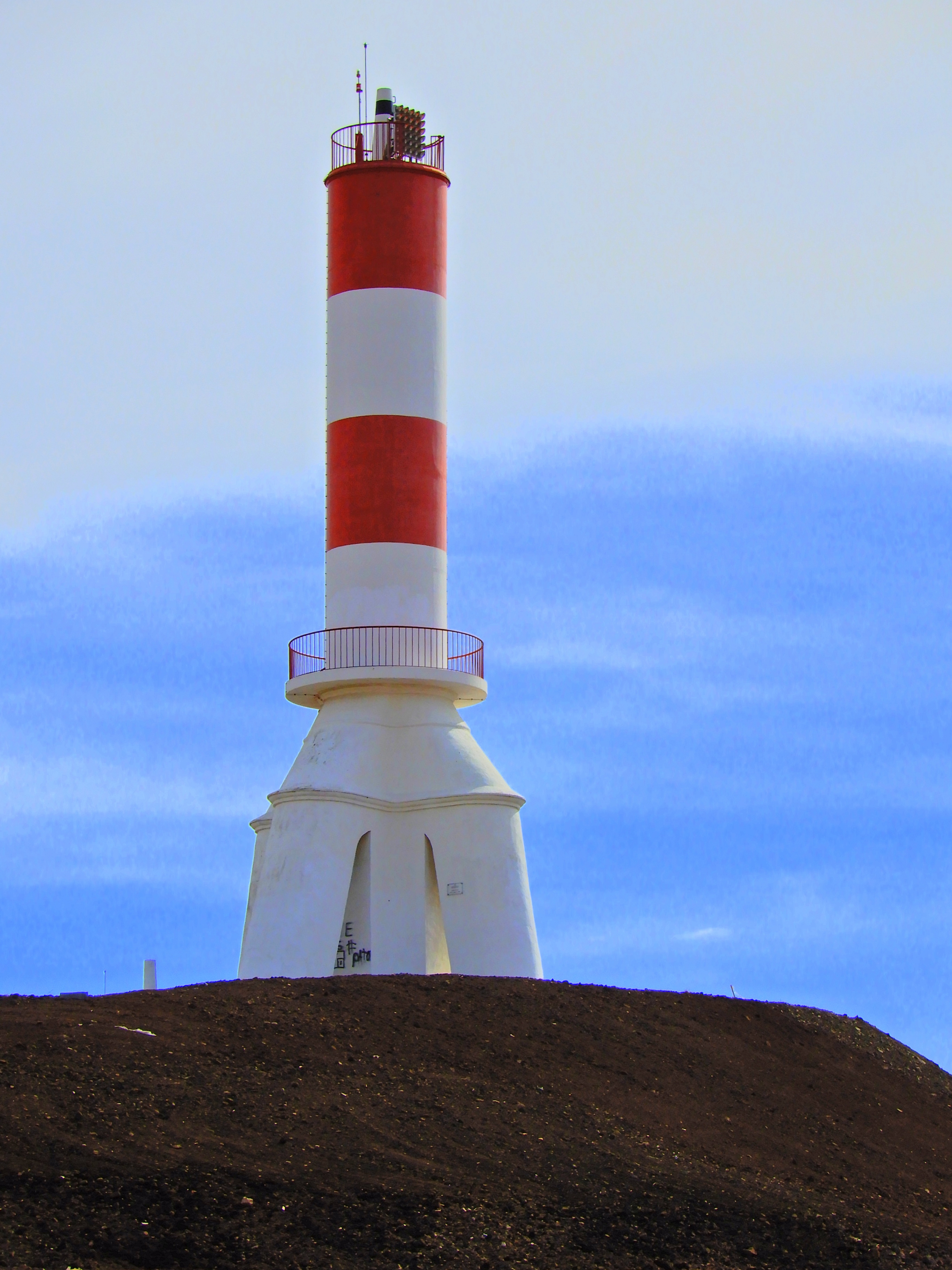
Mama Lighthouse in Portugal, known locally as The Rocket of Carnaxide

The current lighthouse is located about 4 km north-west of Belém. It consists of a metal tripod with a lower gallery, together with a turret with an upper gallery and lantern. An external spiral staircase leads to the lower gallery. The building is 15 m tall and stands at an altitude of 145 metres. It is painted white, the staircase is red and the upper turret carries two red horizontal bands. The lighthouse resembles a rocket on a launching pad and, in fact, is known locally as the “rocket of Carnaxide”.

A directional flashlight Tideland RL 355, at a focal height of 82 metres, was fitted in 1995: prior to that it had no light. The lighthouse was renovated in 2013 to increase the range of the light to 24 nautical miles. It now includes a module that allows GPS synchronization of Mama with Esteiro and Gibalta lights. A web monitoring system has also been installed that allows real-time access to relevant information on the operating state of the light. Recent work has also aimed to raise the lighthouse, whose visibility was being compromised by the construction of tall buildings nearby.

== See also ==
- List of lighthouses in Portugal
- Directorate of Lighthouses, Portugal
