= Gibalta Lighthouse =

Gibalta Lighthouse Farol da Gibalta
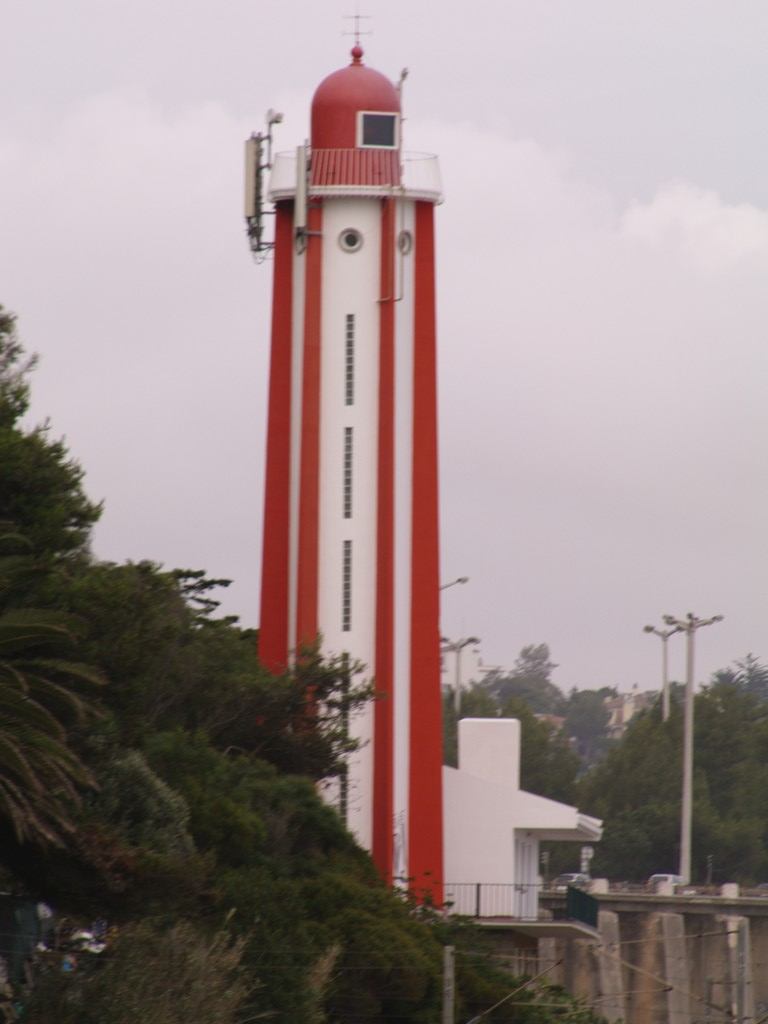
- Location: Oeiras, Lisbon District, Portugal
- Coordinates: 38°41′56.8″N 9°15′59″W

Tower
- Constructed: 1914, rebuilt 1954
- Automated: 1981
- Height: 21 metres (69 ft)
- Heritage: heritage without legal protection

Light
- Focal height: 31 m (102 ft)
- Lens: Fifth-order Fresnel
- Range: 21 nautical miles
- Characteristic: Occ R 3s

The Gibalta Lighthouse (Portuguese: Farol da Gibalta) is an active Portuguese lighthouse located at Oeiras, about 10 km west of the centre of Lisbon. It is a white cylindrical tower with dome and red veins, with illumination being supplied by a red fluorescent light. It was rebuilt in 1954 following a landslide which destroyed the old light and killed ten people on a passing train.

== History ==
Gibalta Lighthouse, together with the neighbouring lighthouses of Esteiro and Mama, were built to replace older lighthouses, originally built between 1878 and 1879 to guide ships into Lisbon's port. These consisted of a catoptric device with a parabolic reflector and an Argand lamp with two twists. The previous Gibalta light was built in 1914 and, like its predecessor, it used a fixed red light. The lighthouse was 13 metres high and 30 metres above sea level. It was not until 1951 that a flashing light was introduced.

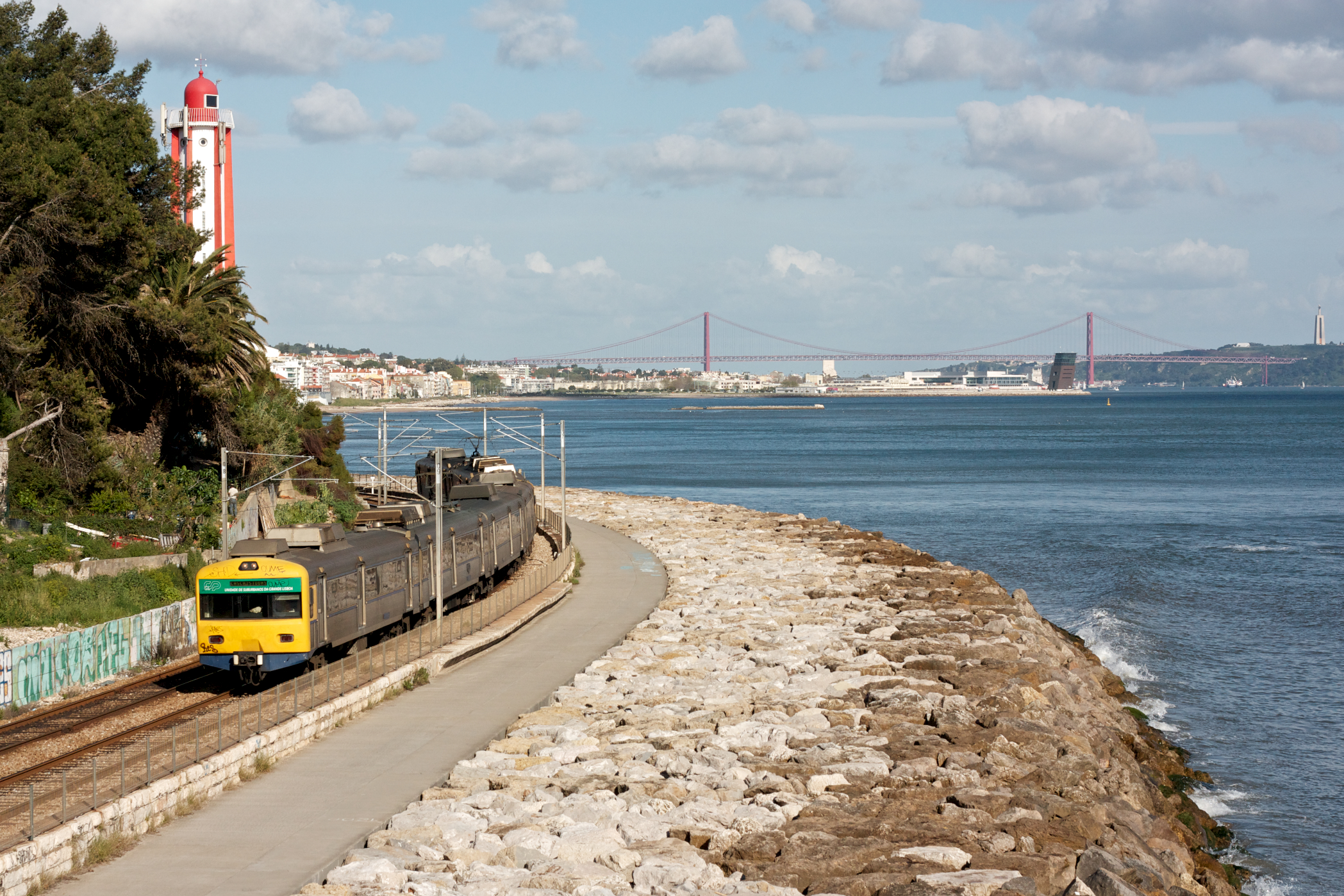
View of Gibalta and railway line in 2011

In 1952 there was a landslide of the land on which the lighthouse was built, causing its partial destruction. Known as the Gibalta rail accident the landslide caused the death of ten people on a train from Cascais to Lisbon, the line for which hugged the coastline and passed underneath the lighthouse. On April 3, 1952, what was left of the lighthouse was demolished and a provisional light was mounted.

The current building began operation on February 10, 1954, about 30 metres from the former building. It is 21 metres tall and 30 metres above sea level. In 1981 it was automated. From 1987 to 1997 it was only lit from 1 October to 15 March, but from 1997 it has been lit all year round. After its construction a new coastal road, known as the “marginal”, was built to connect Lisbon with Cascais. To mitigate the effect of the lights from this road, 4 red fluorescent lamps were mounted externally on the tower. In the year 2000, a new Omron remote control system was established.

== See also ==
- List of lighthouses in Portugal
- Directorate of Lighthouses, Portugal
