= List of shipwrecks in June 1876 =

The list of shipwrecks in June 1876 includes ships sunk, foundered, wrecked, grounded, or otherwise lost during June 1876.

== 2 June ==
List of shipwrecks: 2 June 1876
Ship	State	Description
Prince of Wales	United Kingdom	The schooner foundered between Mousa and Bressay, Shetland Islands. Her four crew survived. She was on a voyage from Caernarfon to Lerwick, Shetland Islands.

== 3 June ==
List of shipwrecks: 3 June 1876
Ship	State	Description
Abel	United Kingdom	The ship ran aground off "Kilburn". She was on a voyage from Glasgow, Renfrewshire to Nicolaieff, Russia. She was refloated with assistance.
Arthur	Norway	The barque was damaged by ice and sank 12 nautical miles (22 km) north east of "Halmsgadd", Sweden. She was on a voyage from Honfleur, Manche, France to Nederkalix Ting, Sweden.
Mary	United Kingdom	The ship was run into by the steamship Perrigne (France) and was severely damaged at Swansea, Glamorgan. She was on a voyage from Swansea to Bridgwater, Somerset. She was towed back to Swansea.
Petrel	United Kingdom	The smack foundered in the Belfast Lough 3 nautical miles (5.6 km) south east of Whitehead, County Antrim. Both crew took to a boat; they were rescued by the Coastguard. She was on a voyage from Whitehead to Bangor, County Down.
Sophia	Denmark	The abandoned schooner was towed in to Grimsby, Lincolnshire, United Kingdom by the smack Excel (United Kingdom).
Venice	United Kingdom	The ship departed from Calcutta, India for Jamaica. No further trace presumed foundered with the loss of all hands.

== 4 June ==
List of shipwrecks: 4 June 1876
Ship	State	Description
Caspar de Robles	Germany	The ship was holed by ice and sank off in the White Sea off Cross Island, Russia. She was on a voyage from Hamburg to Arkhangelsk, Russia.
Oriental	United States	The steamship was driven ashore at Cape Cod, Massachusetts. She was on a voyage from Savannah, Georgia to Boston, Massachusetts.
Richard Wright	United Kingdom	The ship departed from Bassein, India for Liverpool, Lancashire. No further trace, reported missing.
Rollo	United Kingdom	The barque was wrecked on rocks offshore Mindelo, Portugal. Her crew were rescued. She was on a voyage from Malta to London.

== 5 June ==
List of shipwrecks: 5 June 1876
Ship	State	Description
Agnes Campbell	United Kingdom	The ship ran aground at Galway. She was on a voyage from Saint John, New Brunswick, Canada to Galway. She was refloated and found to be leaky.
Brothers	United Kingdom	The schooner was abandoned at the mouth of the River Tay. Her crew were rescued by the Dundee Lifeboat English Mechanic ( Royal National Lifeboat Institution), which was on her first trial voyage. Brothers was on a voyage from Newcastle upon Tyne, Northumberland to Dundee, Forfarshire. She was towed in to Dundee by the tug Fairweather (United Kingdom).
Caledonia	United Kingdom	The schooner was driven ashore at Saint-Valery-sur-Somme, Somme, France. She was on a voyage from Par, Cornwall to Saint-Valery-sur-Somme.
Gefion	Norway	The ship was driven ashore at Paspébiac, Quebec, Canada. She was on a voyage from Norway to Dalhousie, New Brunswick.
Jylland	Denmark	The steamship was driven ashore at Rønne. She was on a voyage from Riga, Russia to Granton, Lothian, United Kingdom. She was refloated and resumed her voyage.
Leander	United Kingdom	The fishing smack was wrecked in Morecambe Bay 2 nautical miles (3.7 km) off the Morecambe Lightship ( Trinity House) with the loss of both crew. She was on a voyage from Piel Island to Morecambe, Lancashire.
Victoria	Spain	The ship was driven ashore at Paspébiac. She was on a voyage from Cádiz to Caraquet, New Brunswick.

== 6 June ==
List of shipwrecks: 6 June 1876
Ship	State	Description
Deccan	United Kingdom	The steamship was driven ashore at St. Margaret's Bay, Kent. She was on a voyage from Southampton, Hampshire to London. She was refloated and resumed her voyage.
Falcon	United Kingdom	The steamship was driven ashore at St. Margaret's Bay. She was on a voyage from Boulogne, Pas-de-Calais, France to London. She was refloated and resumed her voyage.
George	United Kingdom	The smack was destroyed by fire at Greenock, Greenock.
Herradura	United Kingdom	The ship departed from Swansea, Glamorgan for Valparaíso, Chile. No further trace, reported missing.
Lord Stanley	United Kingdom	The ship was wrecked at "Smoky Head", New Brunswick, Canada. Her crew were rescued. She was on a voyage from Cartagena, Spain to Saint John, New Brunswick.
Toivar	Russia	The barque put in to Lagos, Portugal on fire. She was on a voyage from Newcastle upon Tyne, Northumberland, United Kingdom to Genoa, Italy.
Unnamed	Netherlands	The schooner was driven ashore at Dragør, Denmark.
Unnamed	Flag unknown	The schooner was wrecked in the Grand Banks of Newfoundland. Her crew were rescued by Esperance (France).

== 7 June ==
List of shipwrecks: 7 June 1876
Ship	State	Description
Austin	United States	The steamship struck a sunken wreck in the Mississippi River downstream of New Orleans, Louisiana and was lost. She was on a voyage from Havana, Cuba to New Orleans.
Cleopas	United Kingdom	The barque ran aground on the Tobuchin Reef, in the Baltic Sea. She was on a voyage from Gloucester to Kronstadt, Russia.
Galatea	United Kingdom	The steamship put in to Aden on fire.
Ironsides	United Kingdom	The ship was wrecked on Cape Sable Island, Nova Scotia, Canada. Her 26 crew were rescued the next day by the fishing schooner E. Goodwin ( Canada). Ironsides was on a voyage from Liverpool, Lancashire to Saint John, New Brunswick, Canada.
Mayflower	Canada	The schooner was wrecked on Machias Seal Island.
Oxford	United Kingdom	The steamship was driven ashore at the south point of Öland, Sweden and sank. She was on a voyage from Hull, Yorkshire to Kronstadt. She was refloated on 13 June and taken in to Oscarshamn, Sweden.
Renown	United Kingdom	The schooner was wrecked on Eleuthera, Bahamas. Her crew were rescued. She was on a voyage from Eleuthera to London.

== 8 June ==
List of shipwrecks: 8 June 1876
Ship	State	Description
Meridian	Germany	The ship was destroyed by fire at Philadelphia, Pennsylvania, United States.

== 9 June ==
List of shipwrecks: 9 June 1876
Ship	State	Description
Champagne	Canada	The barge collided with the steamship Bolino ( Canada) and sank in the Saint Lawrence River. Her crew were rescued. Champagne was on a voyage from Quebec City to Montreal, Quebec.
Minnie Abbe	United States	The ship ran aground at Boston, Massachusetts. She was on a voyage from Boston to Cape Town, Cape Colony. She was refloated and resumed her voyage.

== 10 June ==
List of shipwrecks: 10 June 1876
Ship	State	Description
Elgin	United Kingdom	The brigantine was driven ashore and wrecked on Eriskay, Outer Hebrides. All thirteen people on board survived. She was on a voyage from Liverpool, Lancashire to Newcastle upon Tyne, Northumberland.
Goethe	Germany	The steamship ran aground in the Elbe at Schulau. She was on a voyage from New York, United States to Hamburg. She was refloated and resumed her voyage.
Kurrachee	United Kingdom	The steamship ran aground on the D'Apres Banks. She was on a voyage from Chittagong, India to Akyab, Burma. She was refloated on 14 June and taken in to Chittagong, India.
McNear	United States	The full-rigged ship ran aground on Hammond's Knowl, in the North Sea off the coast of Norfolk, United Kingdom and was abandoned by her crew, who got aboard the Newarp Lightship ( Trinity House), from where they were rescued the next day by the lifeboat Godsend ( Royal National Lifeboat Institution). McNear was discovered by the schooner Tordenskjold (Norway), which put three of her crew aboard with assistance from the pilot cutter Providence (United Kingdom) and the lifeboat James Pearce ( Royal National Lifeboat Institution). McNear was taken to the Maplin Sand, in the North Sea off the coast of Essex, United Kingdom and then towed to Gravesend, Kent, United Kingdom by the tug Wonder (United Kingdom).
Neva	Russia	The dredger ran aground on Beacon Cairn, in Loch Alsh. She was on a voyage from Glasgow, Renfrewshire, United Kingdom to Kronstadt, Russia.

== 11 June ==
List of shipwrecks: 11 June 1876
Ship	State	Description
Alert	United Kingdom	The ship was wrecked on Langlade Island with the loss of four of her sixteen crew.
King Oscar	Germany	The ship was driven ashore on Fehmarn. She was on a voyage from Riga, Russia to Kiel.
Jane Young	United Kingdom	The ship was wrecked on Langlade Island with loss of life. There were ten survivors. She was on a voyage from Ardrossan, Ayrshire to Quebec City, Canada.
Leon, and Ottone	United Kingdom; Italy	The steamship Leon collided with the barque Ottone. Both vessels were severely damaged. Leon was on a voyage from Liverpool, Lancashire to Manila, Spanish East Indies. She put in to Barcelona, Spain for repairs. Ottone was on a voyage from the west coast of South America to Liverpool. She may have lost a crew member as Leon reported finding a body in the water, presuming Ottone to have sunk. She put in to Cardiff, Glamorgan for repairs.
Nancy's Pride	United Kingdom	The fishing smack capsized and sank off Eastbourne, Sussex with the loss of twelve of the thirteen people on board.
Pearl of Days	United Kingdom	The schooner was sighted whilst on a voyage from Cardiff to Waterford. No further trace, presumed foundered with the loss of all hands.
Quatre Sœurs	(France) Miquelon	The schooner collided with another vessel and foundered in the Atlantic Ocean 45 nautical miles (83 km) off Saint Pierre Island.

== 12 June ==
List of shipwrecks: 12 June 1876
Ship	State	Description
Gabrielle	France	The steamship collided with the steamship Egret (United Kingdom) 12 nautical miles (22 km) north north east of the Longships, Cornwall, United Kingdom. She was taken in tow by Egret, but consequently sank. Her crew were rescued by Egret. Gabrielle was on a voyage from Havre de Grâce, Seine-Inférieure to Swansea, Glamorgan, United Kingdom.
Herald	United Kingdom	The steamship was driven on to the Banks Howe Rocks, on the coast of the Isle of Man. Her passengers were taken off. She was on a voyage from Barrow-in-Furness, Lancashire to Douglas, Isle of Man. Herald was refloated and taken in to Douglas, where she ran aground.
HMS Oberon	Royal Navy	The Antelope-class sloop was sunk by a torpedo in Portchester Creek in an exercise.
Terrebonne	Canada	The steamship was driven ashore. Her passengers were taken off.
Titania	Norway	The barque was driven ashore at Sandø.

== 13 June ==
List of shipwrecks: 13 June 1876
Ship	State	Description
Celine	France	The schooner ran aground on the Randsel, off the German coast. She was on a voyage from Rochefort, Charente-Inférieure to Hamburg, Germany.
Clarisse	Germany	The ship arrived at Whydah, Dahomey from Hamburg on fire. She exploded and sank. Her crew were rescued.
Fairfax	United Kingdom	The steamship ran aground north of the Garo Lighthouse, Öland, Sweden. She was on a voyage from Kronstadt, Russia to Hamburg, Germany.
Gannet	United Kingdom	The ship struck a rock and sank in the Little Minch. Her crew were rescued. She was on a voyage from Stein, Isle of Skye, Outer Hebrides to Ballachulish, Inverness-shire.
Genius	Germany	The ship collided with Norma (Norway) off the Galloper Sand. Two of her crew were rescued by Norma. Genius was presumed to have foundered. She was on a voyage from Bahia, Brazil to Bremerhaven.
Pau	United Kingdom	The ship ran aground at Grimsby, Lincolnshire. She was refloated and found to be waterlogged.
Supplement	United Kingdom	The screw flat collided with the steamship City of Durham and sank in the River Mersey.
Topaz	Canada	The schooner struck an iceberg in the Strait of Belle Isle and became stranded.

== 14 June ==
List of shipwrecks: 14 June 1876
Ship	State	Description
Bonita	New Zealand	The 22-ton schooner was wrecked at the entrance to Coromandel Harbour, New Zealand.
Felicite	United Kingdom	The ship ran aground at La Atunara, Spain. She was refloated.
Geltwood	United Kingdom	The John Sprott-owned barque struck a reef, capsized and sank near Southend, South Australia (37°37′36″S 140°10′51″E) with the loss of all 31 people on board. She was on her maiden voyage, from Liverpool, Lancashire to Melbourne, Victoria.
Gwendoline	United Kingdom	The pilot boat collided with a floating baulk of timber and foundered in the Bristol Channel off Minehead, Somerset. Her crew were rescued.
Rapid	United Kingdom	The brigantine was driven ashore at Morriscastle, County Wexford.

== 15 June ==
List of shipwrecks: 15 June 1876
Ship	State	Description
Agnes	New Zealand	The 128-ton schooner parted her anchors during a gale at Waitangi in the Chatham Islands and was driven onto a reef. All crew and passengers were saved.
Casualidade	Norway	The brig foundered in the Atlantic Ocean. Her crew were rescued by Clara (United Kingdom). Casualidade was on a voyage from Torrevieja, Spain to Christiania.
Maggie Ann	United Kingdom	The fishing vessel was driven ashore at Ardglass, County Down. Her crew survived.
Nydia	United Kingdom	The barque ran aground on Sarn Badrig. She was on a voyage from Liverpool, Lancashire to Quebec City, Canada. She was refloated the next day and taken in to Holyhead, Anglesey.
Petronella	Germany	The ship sprang a leak and foundered in the North Sea. Her crew were rescued by Helene (Sweden). Petronella was on a voyage from Sunderland, County Durham, United Kingdom to Christiania.
Princess	United Kingdom	The tug exploded and sank in the Bristol Channel 7 nautical miles (13 km) east of Lundy Island, Devon with the loss of two of her crew. Survivors were rescued by the tug Electric (United Kingdom).

== 16 June ==
List of shipwrecks: 16 June 1876
Ship	State	Description
Inverness	United Kingdom	The ship was severely damaged by fire at London.
Monattrie	United Kingdom	The ship ran aground on The Knob, off the Kent coast. She was on a voyage from London to Adelaide, South Australia. She was refloated and resumed her voyage.

== 17 June ==
List of shipwrecks: 17 June 1876
Ship	State	Description
Gem	United Kingdom	The schooner was run down and sunk in the River Thames at Deptford, Kent by the steamship Virgo (United Kingdom). Gem was on a voyage from Christiania, Norway] to London. Virgo had suffered a failure of her steering gear and the event was declared by the Court of Admiralty to be an unavoidable accident.
Heversham	New South Wales	The 465-ton barque was wrecked on rocks in Cook Strait while en route from Newcastle, New South Wales, to Wellington with a cargo of coal. The crew was rescued by the Falcon(New Zealand).
Lucie	Denmark	The brig was destroyed by fire in the Atlantic Ocean 20 nautical miles (37 km) off Ouessant, Finistère, France. Her crew were rescued by a French schooner. She was on a voyage from Rouen, Seine-Inférieure, France to Seville, Spain.

== 18 June ==
List of shipwrecks: 18 June 1876
Ship	State	Description
Scotia	United Kingdom	The steamship departed from Calcutta, India for Penang, Straits Settlements. Subsequently wrecked in the Andaman Islands.
St. Peter	(Canada)	The ship ran aground on the Goodwin Sands, Kent, United Kingdom. She was refloated and taken in to The Downs.
Triton	Sweden	The steamship ran aground at Gothenburg. She was on a voyage from Newcastle upon Tyne, Northumberland, United Kingdom. She was refloated.

== 19 June ==
List of shipwrecks: 19 June 1876
Ship	State	Description
Aboyne	United Kingdom	The steamship was driven ashore and wrecked on Cross Island, Russia.
Atalanta	United Kingdom	The ship was severely damaged by an onboard explosion and consequent fire at Cardiff, Glamorgan. Six of her crew were killed.
Dagmar	Russia	The ship ran aground on the Kentish Knock. She was on a voyage from Leith, Lothian, United Kingdom to Cette, Hérault, France. She was refloated with the assistance of two smacks and taken in to Gravesend, Kent, United Kingdom.
Nancy	United Kingdom	The schooner sprang a leak and was beached on the Isle of Arran.
867	Russia	The lighter collided with a barge and sank in the Neva.

== 20 June ==
List of shipwrecks: 20 June 1876
Ship	State	Description
Expectation	United Kingdom	The Thames barge collided with Johanna (Russia) and sank in the River Thames at the entrance to the Regent's Canal.

== 21 June ==
List of shipwrecks: 21 June 1876
Ship	State	Description
Diana	United Kingdom	The yacht was run down and sunk at Greenock, Renfrewshire, either by a tug, or by Bridgwater (United Kingdom). Her six crew were rescued by boats from HMS Jackal (Royal Navy).
Ellen	United Kingdom	The schooner was driven ashore at King's Cross Point, Isle of Arran. She was on a voyage from Glasgow, Renfrewshire to Red Wharf Bay, Anglesey. She was refloated and beached on Holy Isle.
Gilbrow	United Kingdom	The schooner ran aground on the Cordon Bank, off the Isle of Arran. She was refloated with assistance and taken in to Holy Isle.
Gratitude	United Kingdom	The brig was driven ashore on Skagen, Denmark.
Lady Helena	United Kingdom	The schooner was driven ashore in the Hilbre Islands, Cheshire. She was refloated.
Lieutenant-General Kroesen	Netherlands	The steamship struck an uncharted rock, broke in two, and sank at the entrance to the Strait of Sunda off Legundi Island, Netherlands East Indies with the loss of 205 of the 267 people on board. She was on a voyage from Atchin to Batavia, Netherlands East Indies.
Lizzie Morton	United Kingdom	The schooner was driven into the steamship Stentor (United Kingdom) and sank in the River Mersey at Tranmere, Cheshire. Her five crew were rescued by the tug Pioneer (United Kingdom). Lizzie Morton was on a voyage from Fowey, Cornwall to Ellesmere Port, Cheshire.
Margaret	Tasmania	The schooner was wrecked near Port Sorell. Her crew were rescued. She was on a voyage from Melbourne, Victoria to the Mersey River.
Noach IV	Netherlands	The ship capsized at Rotterdam, South Holland. She was righted on 26 June.
Savernake	United Kingdom	The steamship put in to Vigo, Spain on fire. She was on a voyage from Newcastle upon Tyne, Northumberland to Lisbon, Portugal.
The Briton	United Kingdom	The Mersey Flat was driven ashore in the Hilbre Islands. She was refloated.
863	Russia	The lighter sprang a severe leak and was beached between Kronstadt and Saint Petersburg.

== 22 June ==
List of shipwrecks: 22 June 1876
Ship	State	Description
Boni, and Trevithick	Netherlands; United Kingdom	Boni collided with the steamship Trevithick in the Nieuwe Diep. Both vessels were severely damaged.
Buenaventure	United Kingdom	The steamship caught fire at Liverpool, Lancashire. The fire was extinguished.
Fylie	United Kingdom	The steamship collided with the tug Britannia and the yacht Waterlily (both United Kingdom) and was run ashore at Greenwich, Kent. She was on a voyage from a Baltic port to London.
Gogo	United Kingdom	The steamship ran aground in the River Gipping. She was refloated the next day.
Zoar	United Kingdom	The schooner ran aground in the River Gipping.

== 23 June ==
List of shipwrecks: 23 June 1876
Ship	State	Description
Elizabeth	United Kingdom	The ship foundered at the Carpenter Rock, off the coast of Sierra Leone.
Isabella Peek	United Kingdom	The ship foundered off "Port Tucos". She was on a voyage from Bayonne, Basses-Pyrénées to Jersey, Channel Islands.
Williamette	New Zealand	The 28-ton cutter stranded to the south of the entrance to Manukau Harbour and was driven on shore.

== 24 June ==
List of shipwrecks: 24 June 1876
Ship	State	Description
Anita	France	The barque ran aground on the Horse Shoe Bank, off Bathurst, Gambia Colony and Protectorate and was wrecked. She was on a voyage from Bathurst to Belle Île, Morbihan.
Appolline	France	The fishing boat was in collision with Deux Frères (France) at Havre de Grâce, Seine-Inférieure. She was cut in two and sank.
Lochee	United Kingdom	The ship ran aground at Fultah Point in the Hooghly River. She was on a voyage from Melbourne, Victoria to Calcutta, India.
Maria	Russia	The barque was wrecked in the Magdalen Islands, Nova Scotia, Canada. Her crew were rescued.
Memphis	United Kingdom	The steamship was wrecked near the Guia Lighthouse, Portugal. All on board were rescued. She was on a voyage from Alexandria, Egypt to Liverpool, Lancashire.
New York	China	The pilot schooner was run into by the steamship Hupeh (United States) and sank in the Yangtze.
Sophia Jane	United Kingdom	The ship caught fire in the English Channel 30 nautical miles (56 km) east south east of Start Point, Devon and was abandoned. Her crew were rescued by the steamship Auk (United Kingdom). Sophia Jane was on a voyage from Bahia, Brazil to Hamburg, Germany.

== 25 June ==
List of shipwrecks: 25 June 1876
Ship	State	Description
Juventa	United Kingdom	The ship was driven ashore on Cape Sable Island, Nova Scotia, Canada and was abandoned by her crew. She was declared a total loss.

== 26 June ==
List of shipwrecks: 26 June 1876
Ship	State	Description
Dart	United Kingdom	The schooner ran aground on the Maplin Sands, in the North Sea off the coast of Essex. She was on a voyage from Hull, Yorkshire to London. She floated off and sank in the Nab Channel, off the north Kent coast. Her crew were rescued by the smack Two Brothers (United Kingdom).
Glasgow	United Kingdom	The ship was driven ashore in Sandy Bay, Quebec, Canada. She was on a voyage from Sunderland, County Durham to Quebec City. She was later refloated and towed in to Quebec City by Conqueror No. 2 ( Canada).
Mary	United Kingdom	The ship caught fire and was beached on the Isle of Arran, where she burnt out. She was on a voyage from Larne, County Antrim to Glasgow, Renfrewshire.
Sanrack	Norway	The barque was driven ashore and wrecked on Scatarie Island, Nova Scotia, Canada. Her crew were rescued.

== 27 June ==
List of shipwrecks: 27 June 1876
Ship	State	Description
Camilla	United Kingdom	The schooner was driven ashore at Dungeness, Kent. She was refloated the next day with assistance from the Coastguard and taken in to Cowes, Isle of Wight.
Catherine and Mary	United Kingdom	The brig ran aground on the Haisborough Sands, in the North Sea off the coast of Norfolk and was abandoned by her crew. She was on a voyage from Danzig, Germany to London.
Czarevich	Flag unknown	The 428-ton barque left Bluff, New Zealand for Sydney, Australia on 8 June, heavily laden with rail iron, and soon began to leak. The inflow of water was kept in check until the ship hit heavy weather in the Tasman Sea. With Sydney still over 500 miles (800 km) away and the sea running heavily from the west, the master was compelled to turn back east for the nearest available safe harbour. On 26 June, Czarevich reached Big Bay, by which time she had taken on five feet (1.5 m) of water. Provisions and crew were landed, with the ship at anchor in the bay. By the following morning, her hold had almost totally flooded, and she was run ashore. The crew were rescued by the steamship SS Maori (New Zealand).
Humilidade	Portugal	The barque was driven ashore at Montevideo, Uruguay. She was on a voyage from Pernambuco, Brazil to Montevideo. She was refloated the next day and towed in to Montevideo.
Nightingale	Norway	The clipper ran aground at Philadelphia, Pennsylvania, United States. She was refloated.
Primrose	United Kingdom	The brig ran aground in the Pentland Skerries. She was on a voyage from Liverpool, Lancashire to Pillau, Germany. She was refloated and taken in to Lossiemouth, Moray in a leaky condition.
William Thurlbeck	United Kingdom	The brig ran aground on the Nore. She was refloated and resumed her voyage.

== 28 June ==
List of shipwrecks: 28 June 1876
Ship	State	Description
Aerolite	Canada	The schooner was wrecked on Seal Island, Nova Scotia. Her crew were rescued. She was on a voyage from St. Martins, New Brunswick to Yarmouth, Nova Scotia.
Aline	United Kingdom	The ship departed from London for Callao, Peru. No further trace, reported missing.
Eugenio	Flag unknown	The ship ran aground on the Zuidwal. She was refloated and resumed her voyage.
Johanne Frederick	Germany	The brig was severely damaged by an onboard explosion at South Shields, County Durham, United Kingdom. A crew member was severely wounded.
Labuan	United Kingdom	The steamship ran aground on a rock off Glass Island, Outer Hebrides. She was on a voyage from Liverpool, Lancashire to Kronstadt, Russia.
Marmion	United Kingdom	The steamship ran aground at Læsø, Denmark. She was on a voyage from Hartlepool, County Durham to Pillau, Germany. She was refloated with the assistance of a steamship and towed in to Helsingør, Denmark.
Pride of the West	United Kingdom	The ship ran aground in Crow Sound, Isles of Scilly. She was on a voyage from Cardiff, Glamorgan to the Isles of Scilly.

== 29 June ==
List of shipwrecks: 29 June 1876
Ship	State	Description
Emma	Denmark	The schooner sprang a leak and sank. She was on a voyage from Söderhamn, Sweden to Hartlepool, County Durham, United Kingdom.
Febo	Italy	The barque ran aground in the Dnieper upstream of Ochakov, Russia. She was on a voyage from Nicholaieff, Russia to Constantinople, Ottoman Empire.
Jane and Ellen	United Kingdom	The schooner sprang a leak, caught fire and sank in the Belfast Lough.

== 30 June ==
List of shipwrecks: 30 June 1876
Ship	State	Description
Kate	United Kingdom	The ship ran aground on the Burrows Sand, in the North Sea off the coast of Essex. She was on a voyage from Newcastle upon Tyne, Northumberland to London. She was refloated and taken in to Harwich, Essex.

== Unknown date ==
List of shipwrecks: Unknown date in June 1876
Ship	State	Description
Abbey	United States	The brig was abandoned before 26 June. Her crew were rescued. She was on a voyage from Old Harbour to New York.
Andronicus	United Kingdom	The ship was abandoned at sea before 5 June. She was on a voyage from the Rio Grande do Sul to Falmouth, Cornwall.
Auffredy	United Kingdom	The barque ran aground at Höganäs, Sweden before 13 June. She was on a voyage from Liverpool, Lancashire to Pillau, Germany. She was refloated and towed in to Helsingør, Denmark.
Austin	United Kingdom	The ship struck a sunken wreck before 7 June and was wrecked. She was on a voyage from Havre de Grâce, Seine-Inférieure, France to New Orleans, Louisiana, United States.
Canada	United Kingdom	The brig ran aground near Hull, Yorkshire. She was refloated on 5 June and resumed her voyage.
Cardenas	Germany	The barque was driven ashore near "Deurloo", Belgium. She was on a voyage from Buenos Aires, Argentina to Antwerp, Belgium.
Clarendon	United Kingdom	The barque caught fire at sea and was abandoned.
Clotaire	France	The brigantine was driven ashore and wrecked on Langlade Island. Her crew were rescued.
Consett	United Kingdom	The steamship collided with another vessel and was beached at Peniche, Portugal. She was on a voyage from Huelva, Spain to Newcastle upon Tyne, Northumberland. She was refloated and taken in to Lisbon, Portugal for repairs.
Elizabeth	United Kingdom	The ship collided with another vessel and sank in the River Thames at Blackwall, Middlesex. She was refloated on 22 June and towed to Limehouse, Middlesex.
Emilio Barabino	Italy	The barque was driven ashore at Cranberry Head, Nova Scotia, Canada.
Example	United Kingdom	The brig was wrecked at La Guaira, Venezuela.
Flintshire	United Kingdom	The ship was driven ashore at Nanjing, China.
Glenroe	United Kingdom	The ship foundered in the Atlantic Ocean 30 nautical miles (56 km) south of Cape Ray, Newfoundland Colony.
Guadeloupe	France	The steamship was driven ashore at Balo Mancho, near Mayagüez, Puerto Rico. She was refloated and resumed her voyage.
Humber	United Kingdom	The ship was driven ashore at Matane, Quebec, Canada. She was on a voyage from Quebec City to Belfast, County Antrim. She was consequently condemned.
Margaret and Mary	United Kingdom	The schooner ran aground in the Sound of Skye and was severely damaged. She was on a voyage from Runcorn, Cheshire to Peterhead, Aberdeenshire. She was refloated and resumed her voyage, arriving at Peterhead on 2 July.
Margaret Annie	United Kingdom	The schooner foundered in the Bay of Biscay with the loss of all hands. She was on a voyage from the Barbary Coast to Falmouth, Cornwall.
Mina	Sweden	The barque was driven ashore on Öland. She was on a voyage from Kalmar to Rio de Janeiro. She was refloated and put in to Copenhagen, Denmark.
Neptun	Netherlands	The ship was driven ashore on Læsø, Denmark before 12 June. She was on a voyage from Newcastle upon Tyne to Kronstadt, Russia.
Ning Po	China	The steamship struck a sunken rock off Video Island and was damaged.
Prairie Bird	United Kingdom	The barque foundered at sea. Her crew were rescued.
Rising Sun	United Kingdom	The ship was holed by ice and sank. She was on a voyage from Bristol, Gloucestershire to Quebec City.
Rosehall	United Kingdom	The ship was driven ashore and severely damaged at the mouth of the Buffalo River, Cape Colony.
Skjold	Norway	The ship ran aground on the Haaks Bank, in the North Sea off the Dutch coast. Her crew were rescued. She was on a voyage from Purmerend, North Holland, Netherlands to Drammen.
Spherus	United States	The barque foundered in the Atlantic Ocean before 8 June with the presumed loss of all 28 crew.
Star	United States	The full-rigged ship was abandoned at sea with some loss of life.
