= Santa Marta Lighthouse =

Lighthouse and lighthouse museum in Cascais, Portugal

Santa Marta Lighthouse Farol de Santa Marta
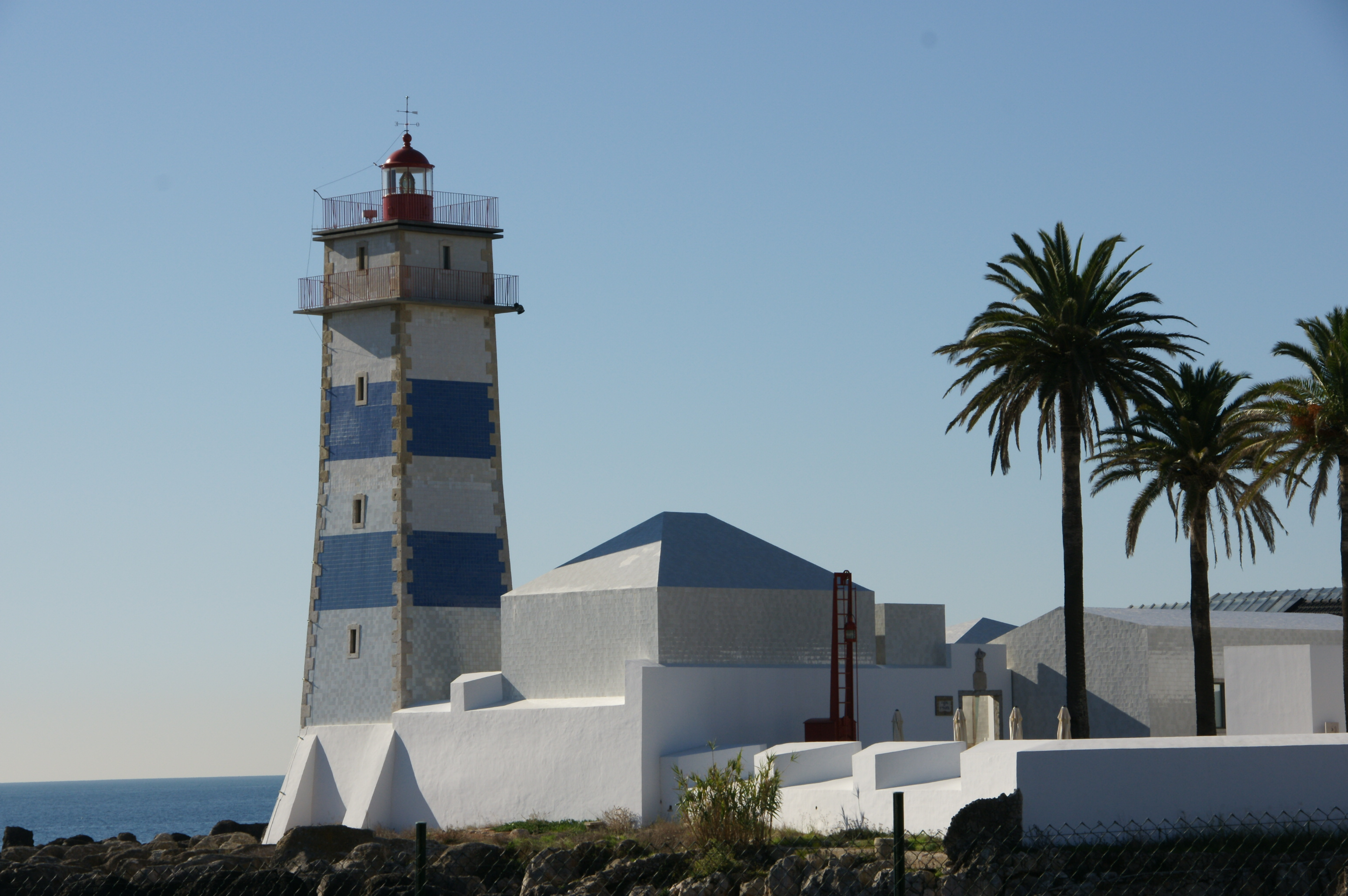
- Location: Cascais, Portugal
- Coordinates: 38°41′25.3″N 9°25′16.8″W

Tower
- Constructed: 1868
- Construction: Stone, Tile
- Automated: 1981
- Height: 20 metres (66 ft)
- Heritage: Included in protected site

Light
- Focal height: 25 m (82 ft)
- Lens: Fifth-order Fresnel
- Range: 18 nautical miles
- Characteristic: Occ WR 6s

The Santa Marta Lighthouse is situated to the south of the centre of Cascais, Lisbon District, Portugal, on the estuary of the River Tagus, providing a light for the Cascais Bay and for the town's new marina. It is a quadrangular masonry tower covered with white tiles, with blue horizontal stripes and a red lantern. The lighthouse was built on the grounds of the Santa Marta Fort, which now houses a lighthouse museum.

== History ==
The Fort of Santa Marta was probably built in the 1640s, later than of the other fortresses that are distributed along the coast of Cascais, since it was not mentioned in the inventory of forts of Cascais made in 1646. This fortress was built with the intention of preventing the approach of enemies to the Cascais Bay area. In the second half of the eighteenth century the fortress was the object of additional work, the most significant being that of 1762–1763, during which the parapet was widened, and that of 1793, in which battery spaces and quarters were expanded.

== The Lighthouse ==
In 1864 the fort was considered to be no longer militarily necessary. However, the strategic position its location had for military reasons also applied to navigation and it was decided to build a lighthouse on the site.

Concluded in 1867, the Santa Marta lighthouse started to signal its area of the coast of Cascais, crossing with the Guia Lighthouse. In 1868, a small tower was added. A report from 1897 stated that the lighthouse had a fixed red light, given by a dioptric lens directed by a catoptric apparatus. This light was replaced by a 5th-order, fixed-light catadioptric system in 1908. In 1936 the tower was increased in height by 8 meters, due to new buildings in the vicinity that impeded the existing light. In 1949 a foghorn system was installed featuring three seconds of sound followed by seven seconds of silence.

The lamp was electrified in 1953, and an automatic light source backup system was also installed, operated by acetylene incandescence. In 1964, a generator was installed thus negating the need for acetylene. Between 1980 and 1981 work was carried out on the complete automation of the lighthouse, which was included in the telecontrol network of the approaches of the Port of Lisbon and in 2000 a new monitoring system was added.

== The Lighthouse Museum ==
Throughout the twentieth century, the fort and lighthouse of Santa Marta gradually became degraded, leading to a proposal to revitalize the space. The restored fort and new Lighthouse Museum were subsequently opened in July 2007. The combination of a working lighthouse together with a lighthouse museum is unique in Portugal.

The collection of the Santa Marta Lighthouse Museum was entirely established by the Portuguese Navy. The exhibition area is divided into two spaces in the former residences of the lighthouse keepers.

- Room 1 - Portuguese Lighthouses: This provides information on the history of lighthouses in Portugal and provides exhibits of the technology used. The exhibition includes large Fresnel lenses, with special emphasis on a panel the former Hyperradiant Fresnel lens of the Berlenga Lighthouse that is 3,70m tall.
- Room 2 - Santa Marta, from Fort to Lighthouse and The Craft of the Lighthouseman focuses on the experience of the lighthouse of Santa Marta through the ages. It includes a keeper's diary, which records in great detail the occurrences of foggy days and illuminated nights.
- In the small auditorium, a multilingual documentary film, The Lighthouses of Portugal - 5 centuries of history, (15 minutes), tells its story through the testimony of lighthouse keepers.

The visitor to the museum also has access to the batteries of the old fort, and its view to the sea and to the Bay of Cascais. Guided tours of the lighthouse are offered for one hour each day.

== See also ==
- List of lighthouses in Portugal
- Directorate of Lighthouses, Portugal

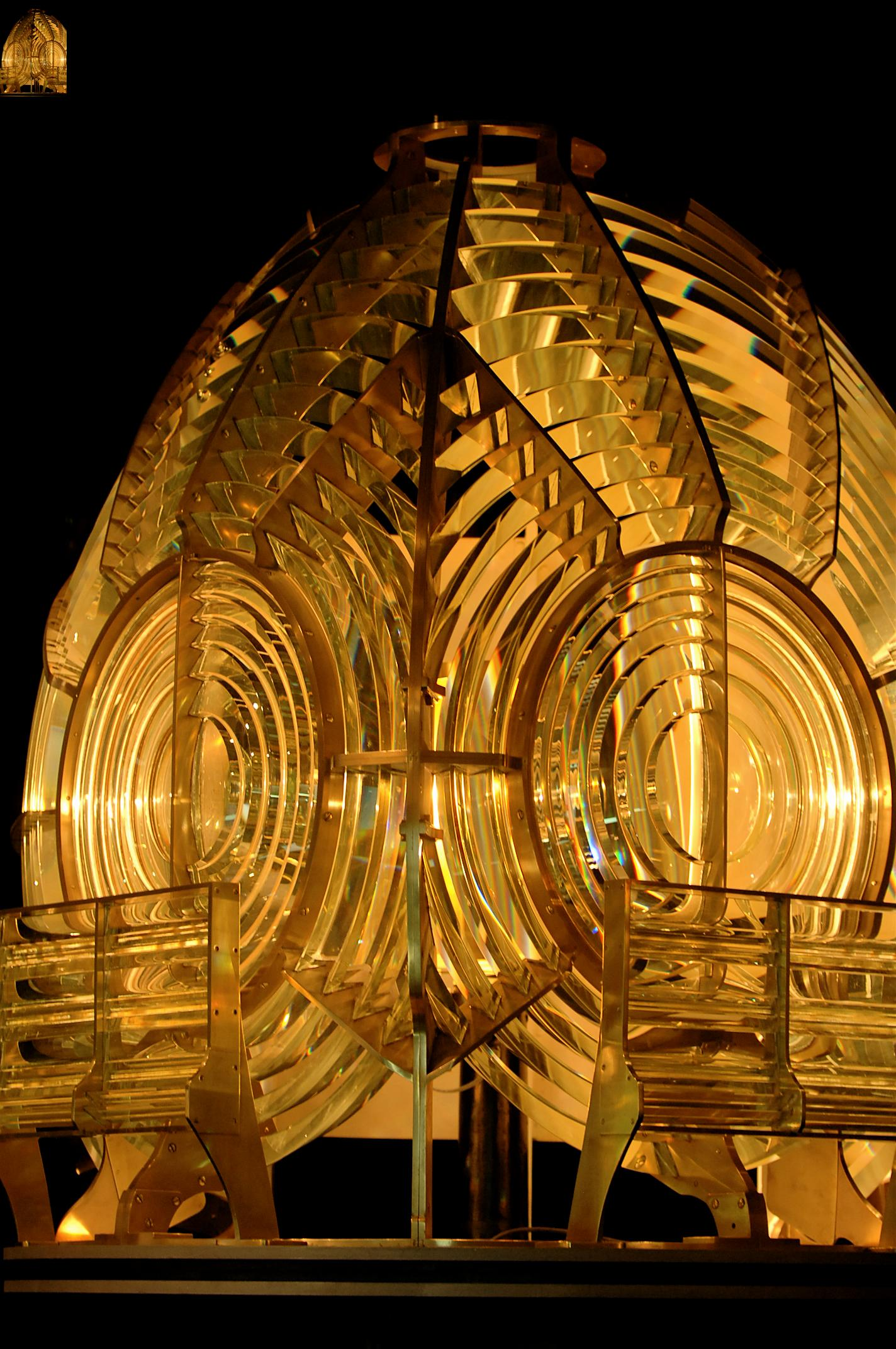
A Fresnel lens exhibited at the museum.

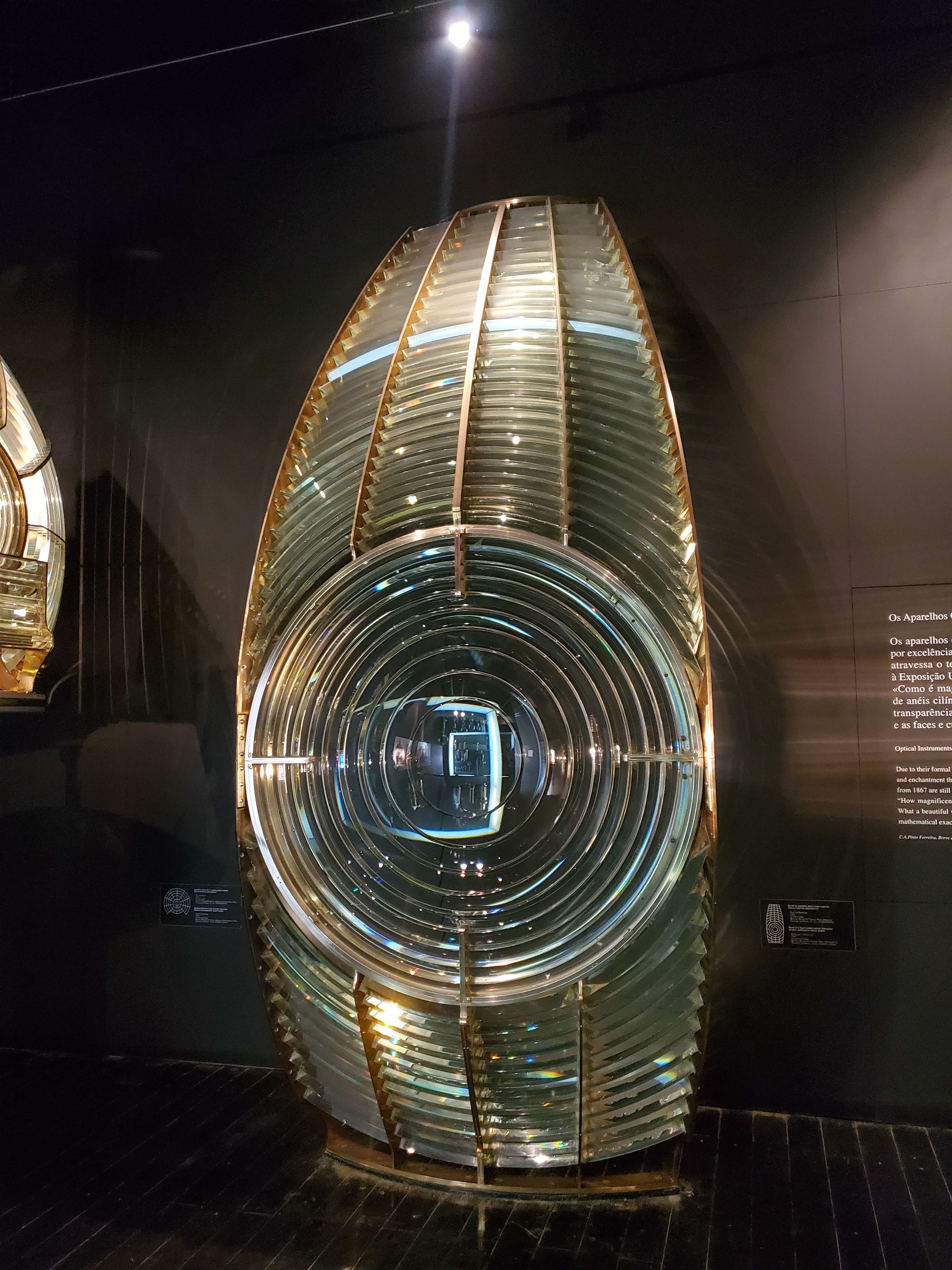
The Hyperradiant Fresnel lens from the Berlenga Lighthouse.
