= Esteiro Lighthouse =

Esteiro Lighthouse Farol do Esteiro
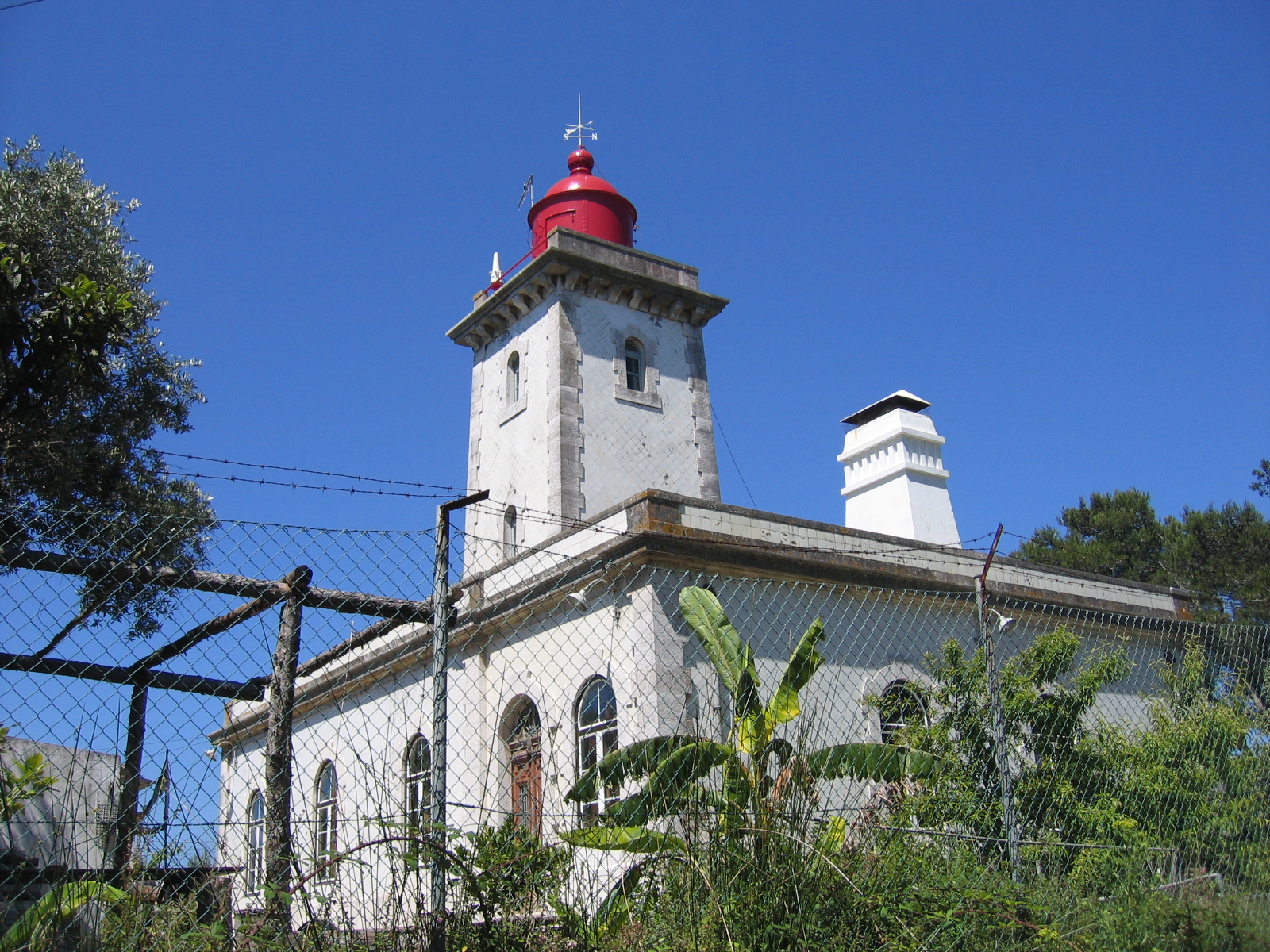
- Location: Oeiras, Lisbon District, Portugal
- Coordinates: 38°42′14″N 9°15′35″W

Tower
- Constructed: 1914
- Construction: stone
- Automated: 1981
- Height: 15 metres (49 ft)
- Heritage: heritage without legal protection

Light
- Focal height: 82 m (269 ft)
- Lens: Fifth-order Fresnel
- Range: 21 nautical miles
- Characteristic: Occ R 6s

The Esteiro Lighthouse (Portuguese: Farol do Esteiro) is an active Portuguese lighthouse located at Oeiras, about 10 km west of the centre of Lisbon, in parkland that also contains the National Stadium of Portugal. It is a rectangular masonry tower covered with white tiles. The south side has two red horizontal bands that serve as identification during daylight.

== History ==
On August 1, 1878, two red lights were introduced at Alto de Caxias and Porto Covo. These directed the path that vessels should follow when entering and exiting the Port of Lisbon. Initially the lights were housed in wooden constructions but in December 1879, when the towers had been completed, fixed red lights were installed in both. They each consisted of a catoptric device with a parabolic reflector and an Argand lamp with two twists.

In 1913 it was decided to transfer these lights to Esteiro and Gibalta with the intention that these, together with the nearby Mama lighthouse would mark the channel into Lisbon's port. The Esteiro lighthouse went into operation in May 1914. Its tower is 15 meters high and the light is 82 meters above sea level. It is several hundred metres inland, about 800 metres northeast of the Gibalta light.

The optical apparatus is dioptric catadioptric, a fifth-order bulls-eye Fresnel lens. The light is red, fixed, illuminating an arc of 15º. From March 1916 to December 1918, it was not used due to World War I. In 1926 two red central stripes were painted on the face of the tower facing south, thus showing five bands of equal width, alternately white and red. A building was built next to the tower in 1949 in order to install a radio beacon. The light was electrified with power from the public grid in 1951. In the event of a power failure, an automatic backup generator was available. Also in 1951, a flashing light was introduced with four-second flashes. In 1957 a new installation means that in the event of electricity failure, the light automatically switches to acetylene gas. In 1970, four fluorescent lamps of mounted in watertight containers on the outside of the tower. Since 1997 the Esteiro lighthouse has been lit continuously throughout the year. A radar beacon has also been installed.

== See also ==
- List of lighthouses in Portugal
- Directorate of Lighthouses, Portugal
