= Gibalta rail accident =

1952 railway incident in Portugal

Coordinates: 38°41′58″N 09°15′59″W

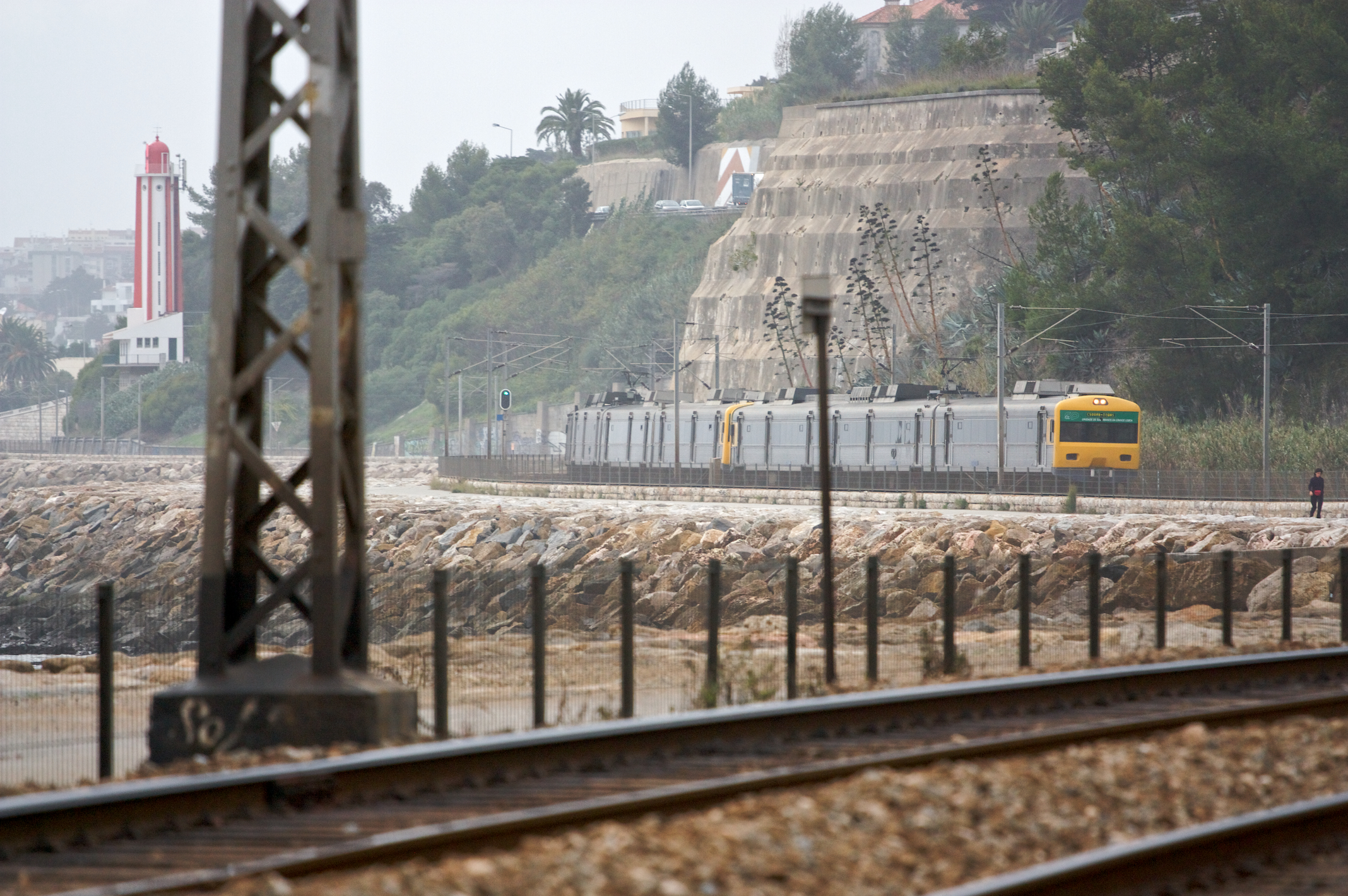
- View of the Linha de Cascais with the Farol da Gibalta at left, 2009.

Details
- Date: 31 March 1952; 11:45 WET (GMT+00:00)
- Location: Farol da Gibalta (Gibalta lighthouse)
- Country: Portugal
- Line: Linha de Cascais
- Operator: Sociedade Estoril
- Incident type: Derailment

Statistics
- Trains: 1
- Deaths: 10
- Injured: 38

The Gibalta rail accident occurred on 31 March 1952, on the Linha de Cascais (Cascais line) in Portugal. It was a derailment due to landslides caused by adverse weather conditions and the bad conservation status of the surrounding land. The accident resulted in 10 dead and 38 injured.
