= Berlenga Lighthouse =

Lighthouse in Portugal

Berlenga Lighthouse Farol da Berlenga
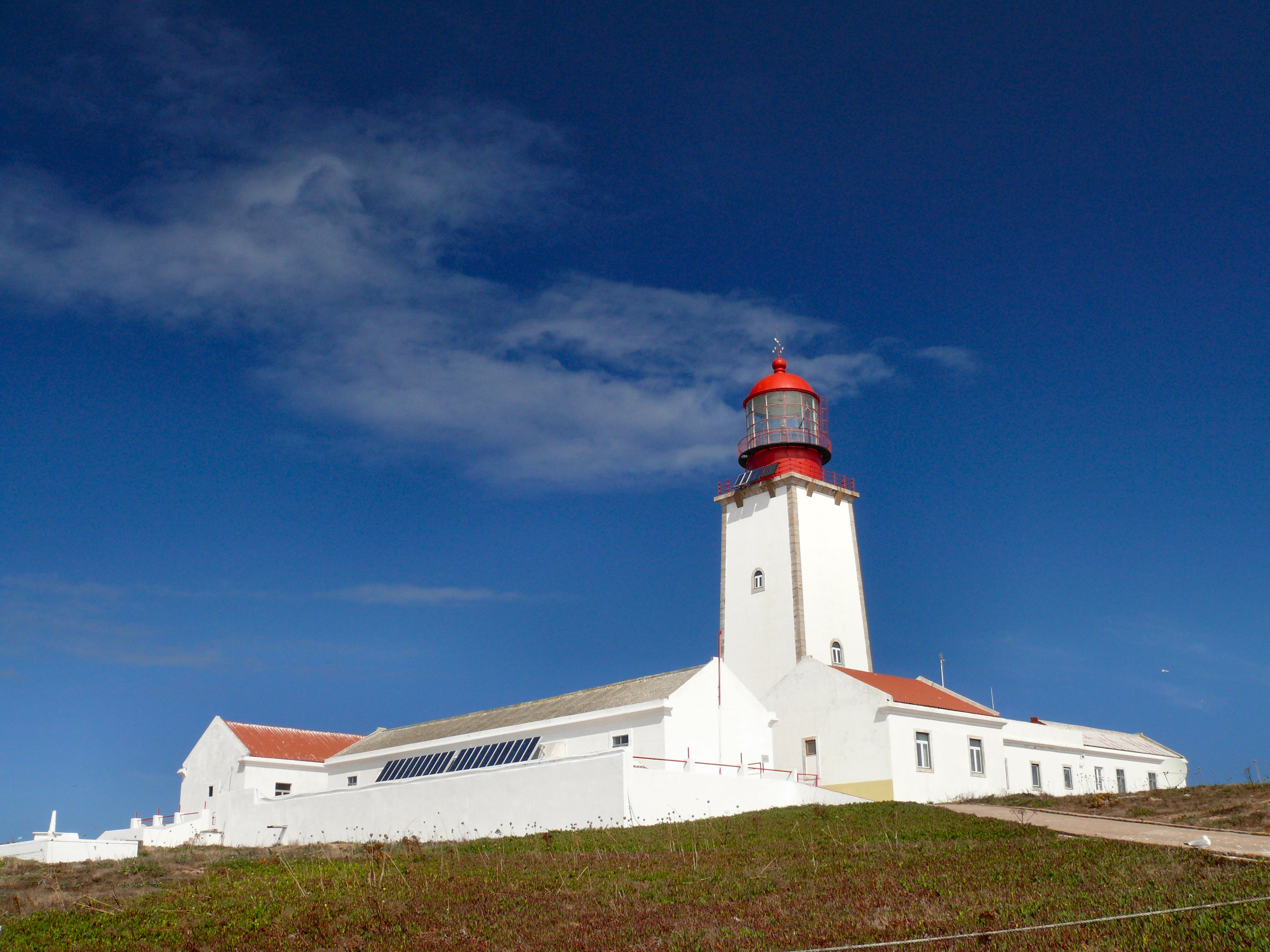
- Lighthouse on Berlenga Grande island, Portugal
- Location: Off coast of Peniche, Portugal
- Coordinates: 39°24′48″N 9°30′30″W

Tower
- Constructed: 1842
- Construction: stone
- Automated: 1985
- Height: 29 metres (95 ft)
- Operator: Directorate for Lighthouses (Direcção de Faróis)
- Heritage: heritage without legal protection

Light
- Focal height: 121 m (397 ft)
- Lens: LED Optics
- Range: 27 nautical miles
- Characteristic: Fl W 10s

Berlenga lighthouse (Portuguese: Farol da Berlenga), also known as the Duke of Bragança Lighthouse, is a functioning lighthouse situated on the highest point of the granite island of Berlenga Grande (Great Berlenga), which is a nature reserve in the Atlantic Ocean, 10 kilometres west of the town of Peniche in the Leiria District of Portugal. Although planned for construction in the 18th century, work did not start until 1837 and it was completed in 1842.

== History ==
Following the 1755 earthquake that affected much of Portugal the Marquis of Pombal, who was placed in charge of reconstruction, created an organized Lighthouse Service in 1758 and ordered six lighthouses to be built. The Berlenga lighthouse was intended to be one of these but, unlike the other five, it was not built. Only in December 1836 did the Portuguese Ministry of Finance commission an engineer, Gaudêncio Fontana, to construct a lighthouse on the island.

The equipment consisted of a catoptric device, with sixteen oil-fired Argand lamps with parabolic reflectors, giving off a white light with ten-second flashes. The rotation movement was activated by a clockwork mechanism. The long duration of the infrequent flashes led to it being criticized for poorly serving navigation as it could be easily confused with other lights. In 1896, while a new optical device was being fitted, two interim beacons were used. The new device, supplied by the French company of Barbier, Benard, et Turenne, began to function definitively on November 6, 1897, making one complete rotation in 30 seconds, with a group of three flashes in this time. The light source was derived from petroleum vapor until 1926, when generators were introduced, allowing a light bulb to be used, with a range of 36 nautical miles. One of the two Fresnel lens used is now on display at a museum operated near Lisbon by the Lighthouse Directorate, which is a branch of the Portuguese Navy, and the other is at the Santa Marta Lighthouse museum in Cascais.

The lighthouse was automated in 1985 and the existing light was replaced by a Pharos Marine PRB-21 sealed beam optic. The lighthouse and staff residences started to use solar energy from 2000. The PRB 21 was removed and a modern high-performance rotary headlamp was introduced, with an estimated range of 20 nautical miles. A new foghorn was also introduced. In 2001 the Lighthouse Directorate was awarded the National Defense and Environment Prize, which aims to encourage good environmental practices in the Portuguese Armed Forces, for the use of solar energy at the Berlenga Lighthouse. In 2009 the TRB-400 was replaced by two LED optics.

The tower is quadrangular, 29 metres high, constructed of masonry and painted white. It has a balcony at the top. The light has an altitude of 121 metres. Although it is automated, lighthousekeepers still live on-site but, since 1975, their families have been accommodated at the mainland Cape Carvoeiro lighthouse in Peniche.

== See also ==
- List of lighthouses in Portugal
