= Guia Lighthouse (Portugal) =

Lighthouse near Cascais, Portugal

Guia Lighthouse Farol da Guia
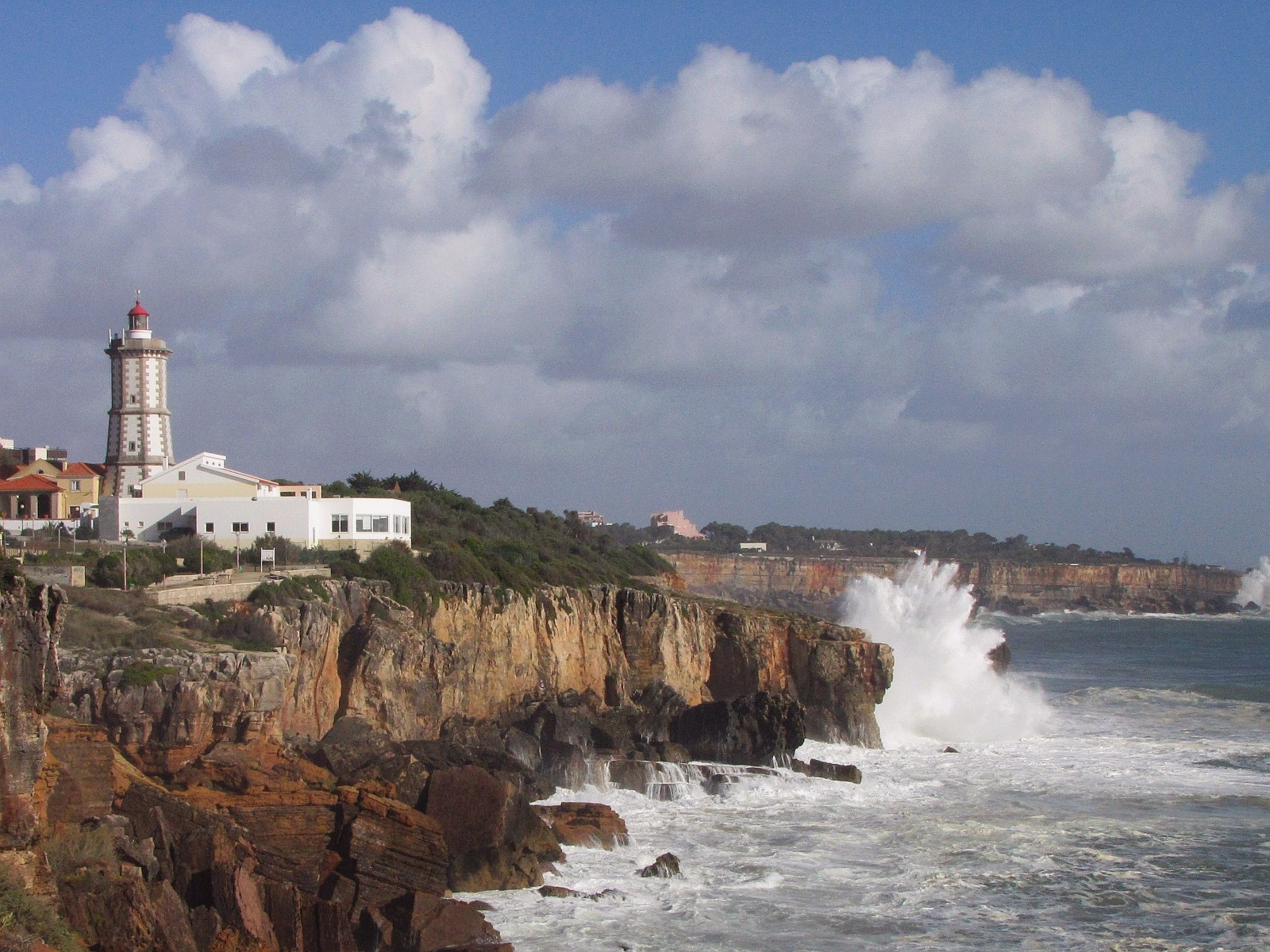
- Location: North Atlantic Ocean, Cascais e Estoril, Portugal
- Coordinates: 38°41′44″N 9°26′47″W

Tower
- Constructed: 1761
- Construction: stone
- Automated: 1982
- Height: 28 m (92 ft)
- Heritage: heritage without legal protection

Light
- Focal height: 58 m (190 ft)
- Lens: third order Fresnel lens
- Range: 19 nmi (35 km; 22 mi)
- Characteristic: Iso R 2s

The Guia lighthouse (Portuguese: Farol da Guia) is an active Portuguese lighthouse located at Cabo da Guia, about 2 km west of the centre of Cascais. It is an octagonal tower in white masonry with a red lantern that has a range of 18 nautical miles.

== History ==
As a result of its position on the estuary of the Tagus River, Cabo da Guia had always been important for navigation. From 1523, this point on the Portuguese coast was illuminated by the chapel of the Hermitage of Our Lady of Guia. In 1537 the brothers of the hermitage raised a tower where a group of four or five oil lights were lit. This light was maintained by the brotherhood, keeping it lit for about eight months of the year.

During the 1755 Lisbon earthquake the tower was badly damaged, requiring major reconstruction works and equipment replacement. To illuminate several points of the coastline the Marquis of Pombal ordered six lighthouses to be built, of which the Guia lighthouse was one.

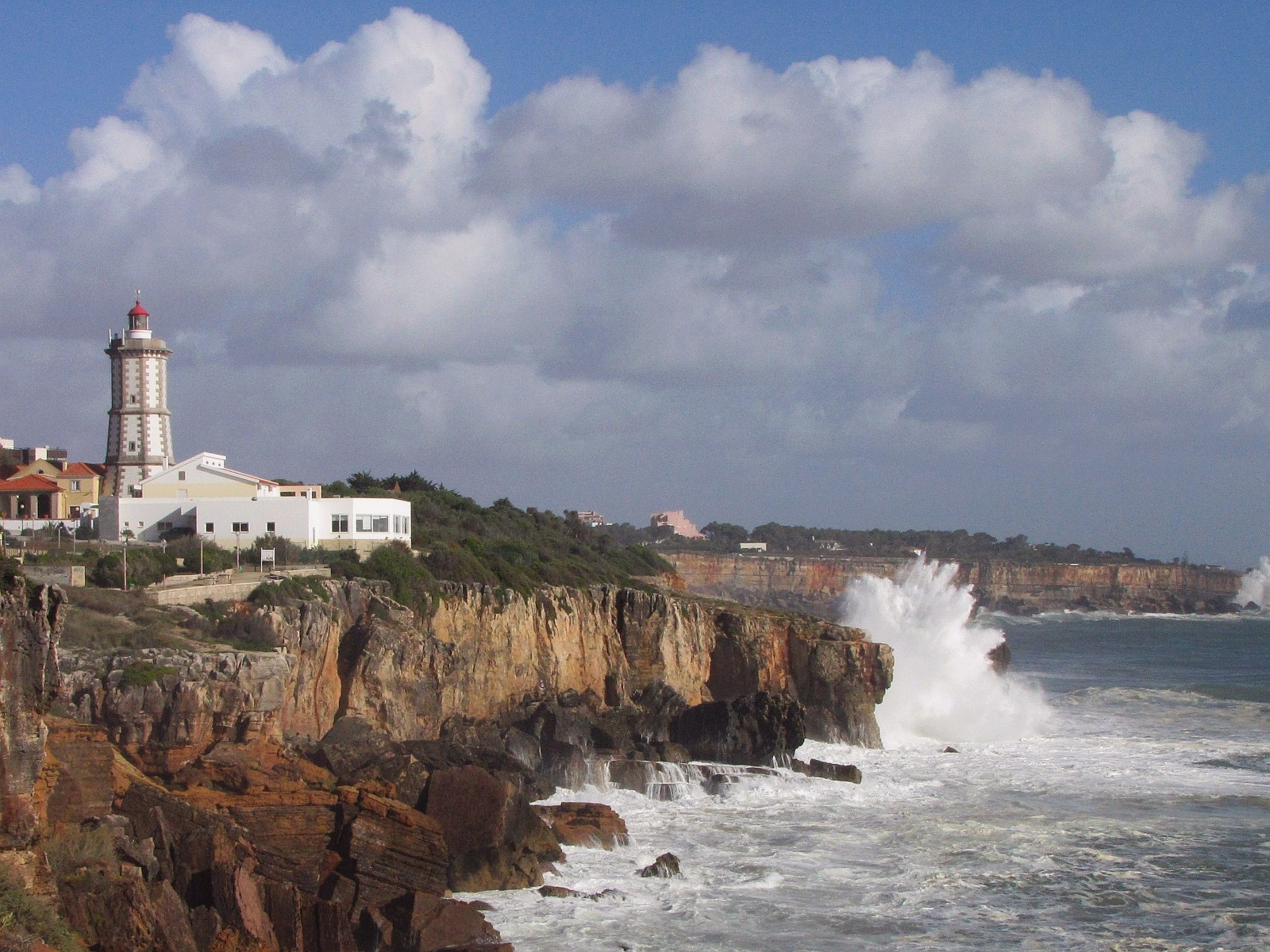
Coastal view of the lighthouse

The rebuilt Guia lighthouse was completed in 1761. It now emits a fixed white light, with a range of 19 nautical miles in good visibility, over an arc of 240 degrees. Its tower, which is 23 meters high, is made up of thick masonry walls. It was lined with white tiles in the mid-19th century and renovated in April 2003.

The Guia lighthouse was electrified in 1957. Together with other lighthouses near to Lisbon it was automated in 1982 and is not staffed. A monitoring system transmits an SMS message whenever a fault occurs.

== See also ==
- List of lighthouses in Portugal
- Directorate of Lighthouses, Portugal
