= Directorate of Lighthouses, Portugal =

Organization managing Portugal's lighthouses

Coordinates: 38.6915°N 9.2948°W

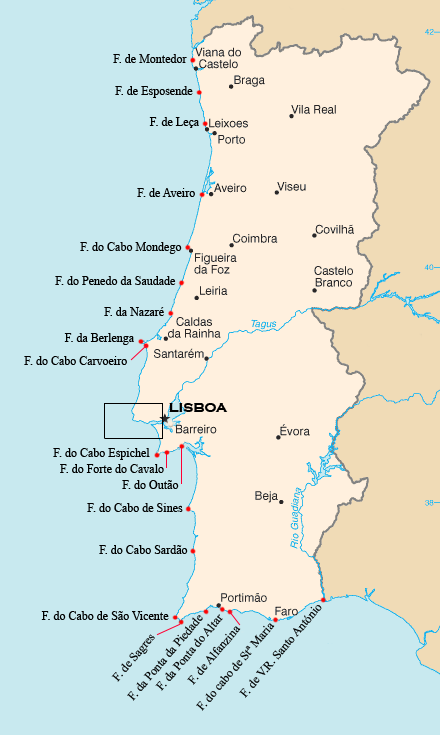
Lighthouses in Portugal

The Directorate of Lighthouses in Portugal (Direção de Faróis) is responsible for managing the country's 47 lighthouses, as well as other marine navigation activities. It is headquartered in Paço de Arcos.

Lighthouses have played an important role in Portugal's maritime history. Portuguese sailors launched and led the Age of Discovery, and Portuguese ships have been sailing to far parts of the world for around 600 years. It is, therefore, not surprising that lighthouses have developed along the entire length of the country's coast and that today many are highly cherished national monuments. Since 1892, the Portuguese Navy has been responsible for maintaining the lighthouse network on the coast of Portugal. This is the responsibility of its Directorate of Lighthouses, which is a part of the National Maritime Authority (Autoridade Marítima Nacional). The Directorate was founded in 1924 and is a member of the International Association of Marine Aids to Navigation and Lighthouse Authorities. Its mission includes:

- Supporting, training and ensuring the technical and professional conduct of lighthouse keepers;
- Inspecting technical compliance, operation and maintenance of navigation aids;
- Installing, operating and maintaining aids for navigation (with the exception of inside ports);
- Ensuring the uniformity of aids to navigation, in accordance with international recommendations;
- Studying and proposing the creation of maritime signalling easement zones;
- Maintaining, preserving and repairing coastal lighthouse infrastructure;
- Managing the MMSIs (Maritime Mobile Service Identities) used in maritime signalling equipment.

The Directorate has a staff of 104, including military and civilians. It has the same number of lighthouse keepers, of which 60 cover the 28 lighthouses of the mainland, 34 the 15 lighthouses of the Azores and 10 the 4 lighthouses of Madeira. Its headquarters are at Paço de Arcos, near Lisbon and there are four Differential GPS Control Stations, at Cabo Carvoeiro Lighthouse, Peniche and the Sagres Lighthouse on the mainland and at Horta in the Azores and at Porto Santo on Madeira.

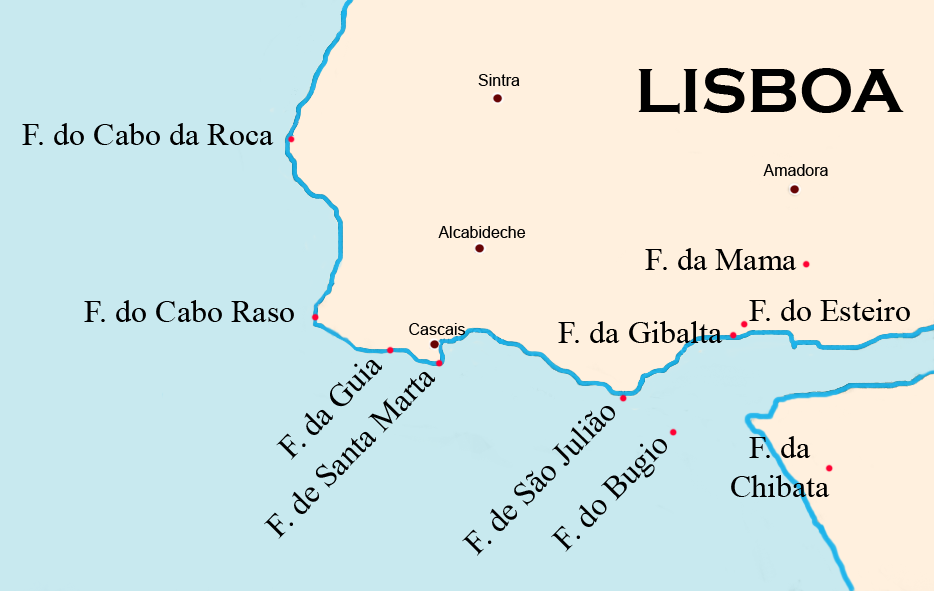
Detail: Lighthouses in the Lisbon District

Twenty-eight of the lighthouses and a small museum at the headquarters can be visited, on Wednesday afternoons. There is another museum at the Santa Marta Lighthouse in Cascais, which is open all days except Monday.

== See also ==
- List of lighthouses in Portugal
